= Raiden (film) =

1928 film

- DVD cover
- Directed by: Shozo Makino; Sadatsugu Matsuda
- Written by: Shōzō Makino
- Starring: Toichiro Negishi; Arata Kaneko; Matsue Bassho; Masahiro Makino
- Narrated by: Midori Sawato
- Cinematography: Minoru Miki
- Production company: Makino Film Productions
- Distributed by: Digital Meme (DVD)
- Release date: 29 June 1928 (Japan)
- Running time: 18 minutes
- Country: Japan
- Language: Silent

Raiden (Japanese: 雷電) is a 1928 black and white Japanese short silent film with benshi accompaniment directed by Shozo Makino and Sadatsugu Matsuda. It is a posthumous work by Makino and is the last film starring his son, Masahiro Makino. in his first role in a comedy film.
