= Ninkyō Shimizu-minato =

Ninkyō Shimizu-minato Port of Honor
- Japanese movie poster
- Directed by: Sadatsugu Matsuda
- Written by: Yoshitake Hisa
- Produced by: Mitsuo Makino; Yasumasa Omori; Jun'ichirô Tamaki
- Starring: Chiezō Kataoka; Eijirō Tōno; Ryūnosuke Tsukigata; Utaemon Ichikawa; Hashizo Okawa
- Cinematography: Shintarō Kawasaki
- Edited by: Shintarō Miyamoto
- Music by: Shirō Fukai
- Distributed by: Toei Company
- Release date: January 3, 1957 (Japan)
- Running time: 103 minutes
- Country: Japan
- Language: Japanese

Ninkyō Shimizu-minato (Japanese: 任侠清水港, Hepburn: Ninkyō Shimizu-minato; lit. Port of Honor), also known as Shimizu Port of Chivalry, is a 1957 color Japanese film, directed by Sadatsugu Matsuda (松田定次), and the first of an all-star cast trilogy, loosely based on the legend of Shimizu Jirocho (1820–1893), Japan's most famous gangster and folk hero, whose life and exploits were featured in sixteen films between 1911 and 1940.

== Plot ==
As the gangster boss of the Tokaido Road, Jirocho (Cheizo Kataoka) sends his men to track down a fugitive, who has killed Jirocho's associate. They eventually find the fugitive hiding out at the property of another gangster boss, Kansuke (Eijiro Tono), who unknowingly shelters a wanted man.

Kansuke's nephew Kurokoma (Ryunosuke Tsukigata), wanting to take over Jirocho's control over the Tokaido Road, convinces Kansuke that the fugitive is a spy for Jirocho. After an angry confrontation between Jirocho and Kansuke, they rally their men for a battle, but gangster boss Omaeda (Utaemon Ichikawa) intervenes and appeals to Jirocho to reconsider. Jirocho's wife Ocho urges him to listen.

Omaeda and Jirocho have a conversation that completely alters Jirocho's outlook. He calls off the battle and instructs his men to assist poor farmers, villagers and temples as part of his spiritual atonement.

Meanwhile, Kurokoma conspires to take advantage of Jirocho's vow not to fight by plotting a battle that could destroy Jirocho and his men.

== Cast ==
- Chiezō Kataoka 片岡千恵蔵 (Jirocho of Shimizu)
- Eijirō Tōno (Kansuke)
- Ryūnosuke Tsukigata (Kurokoma)
- Utaemon Ichikawa (市川右太衛門) (Omaeda)
- Hashizo Okawa (大川橋蔵) (Sangoro)
- Kinnosuke Nakamura 中村錦之助 (Ishimatsu)
- Chiyonosuke Azuma 東千代之介 (Shichigoro)
- Yumiko Hasegawa (Osen)
- Ryūtarō Ōtomo 大友柳太朗 (Chobei)
- Isao Yamagata (Miyakodori)
- Eitarō Shindō (Kyuroku)
- Shinobu Chihara (Otami)
- Takachiho Hidzuru 高千穂ひづる
- Fushimi Sentaro 伏見扇太郎

== Success ==
All three parts of Sadatsugu Matsuda's trilogy enjoyed great success at the annual box office. The first film, Port of Honor, earned ¥353 million in box office revenues, making it the most successful Japanese film of 1957. The second entry, A Chivalrous Spirit, grossed over ¥341 million during its initial run, becoming the fifth highest-grossing film of 1958. The third part, Road of Chivalry was even more successful and earned ¥350 million, again being the highest-grossing film at the annual box office. According to film critic Pablo Knote, the trilogy was essential in establishing director Sadatsugu Matsuda as "Japan's financially most successful filmmaker of the 1950s".

The trilogy, directed by Sadatsugu Matsuda, starring Cheizo Kataoka as Jirocho of Shimizu:

- Ninkyo Shimizu-minato (Port of Chivalry) (1957)
- Ninkyo Tokaido (A Chivalrous Spirit) (1958)
- Ninkyo Nakasendo (Road of Chivalry) (1960)
