= Hangyakuji =

1961 Japanese historical-fiction film

- Film poster
- Directed by: Daisuke Itō
- Screenplay by: Daisuke Itō
- Starring: Kinnosuke Nakamura; Ryosuke Kagawa; Haruko Sugimura; Chiyonosuke Azuma; Ryūnosuke Tsukigata
- Cinematography: Makoto Tsuboi
- Edited by: Shintarō Miyamoto
- Music by: Akira Ifukube
- Distributed by: Toei Company
- Release date: November 8, 1961 (Japan)
- Running time: 110 minutes
- Country: Japan
- Language: Japanese

Hangyakuji (Japanese: 反逆児; lit. The Conspirator) is a 1961 Japanese historical fiction film directed by Daisuke Ito. It features Kinnosuke Yorozuya, Kaneko Iwasaki, and Tsukie Matsuura.

== Plot ==
Saburo Nobuyasu, a young king, has trouble finding happiness and comfort. He feels more upset when he is set for an arranged marriage with Tokuhime, who is the daughter of Saburo's worst enemy, Oda Nobunaga. He feels even worse when due to his mother, who is very manipulative to him.

== Cast ==
- Kinnosuke Nakamura as Saburō Nobuyasu
- Ryosuke Kagawa as Ōkubo Tadayo
- Haruko Sugimura as Tsukiyama
- Chiyonosuke Azuma as Hattori Haznō
- Ryūnosuke Tsukigata as Oda Nobunaga

== Background ==
The movie is loosely based on The Battle of Okehazama.
