= Hashizo Okawa =

Japanese actor (1929–1984)

Hashizō Ōkawa II
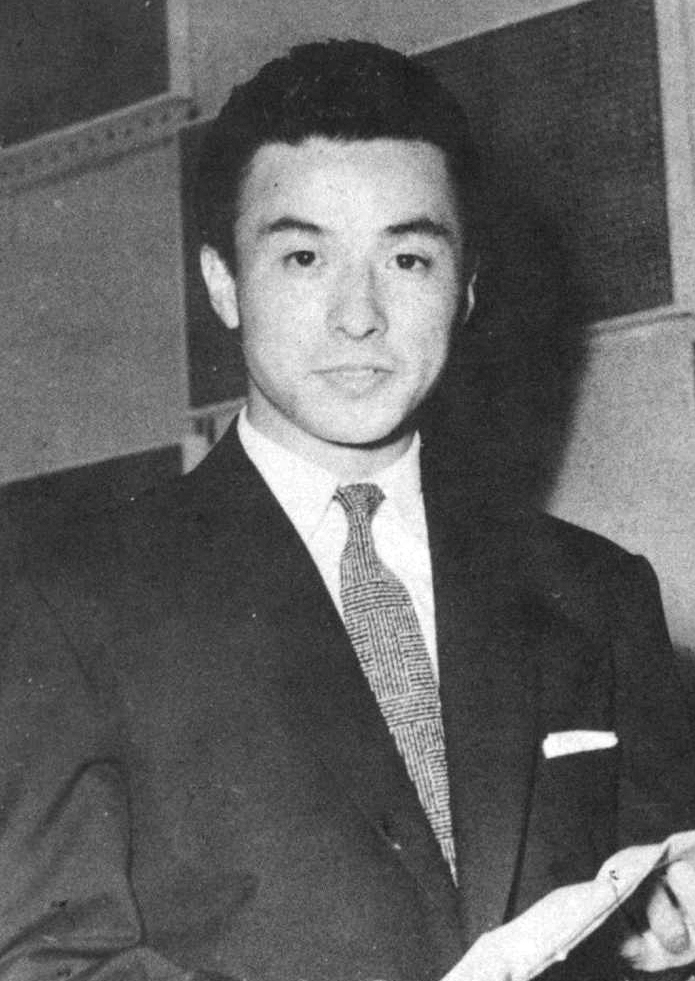
- Hashizō in 1956
- Born: Tominari Ono; 9 April 1929; Tokyo, Japan
- Died: 7 December 1984 (aged 55); Japan
- Occupation: Actor
- Years active: 1955-1984

Hashizō Ōkawa II (大川 橋蔵, Ōkawa Hashizō; 9 April 1929 – 7 December 1984) was a Japanese film actor. He appeared in more than one hundred Jidaigeki films from 1955 to 1967.

== Biography ==
Born in Tokyo, the son of a Yanagibashi geisha, he was soon adopted by the Ono (小野) family. His adoptive father was a kabuki actor named Takinoyo Ichikawa II (二代目市川瀧之丞), who trained him in dance and kabuki acting from an early age.

In November 1935, he made his kabuki stage debut as Omemaru Ichikawa (市川男女丸) and quickly got the attention of Kikugorō Onoe VI (六代目尾上菊五郎), who took him under his wing as part of a long line of great onnagata (actors who play women's parts in kabuki).

In October 1944, he was adopted by Chiyo Terashima (寺島千代), wife of Kikugorō Onoe VI, inheriting the family name of Niwa (丹羽) to become Tominari Niwa (丹羽 富成, Niwa Tominari). At the time, he also appeared on the kabuki stage as Hashizo Okawa II (二代目大川橋蔵) for the first time.

In 1955, he made his film debut at the request of Mitsuo Makino (マキノ光雄), with the Jidaigeki film A Warrior's Flute (笛吹若武者) opposite Hibari Misora (美空ひばり).

Working exclusively for Toei, Okawa quickly became the studio's most popular star appearing in many films, and headlining a number of series, including eight films as Shingo Aoi, the illegitimate son of Shōgun Yoshimune Tokugawa.

After appearing in at least 113 films over a twelve-year period from 1955 to 1967, he moved on to television playing the same role he did in his final theatrically released film, the Edo period detective Heiji Zenigata, which he portrayed in 888 TV episodes over the next 18 years until his death from colon and liver cancer at age 55 in 1984.

Hashizo Okawa is recorded in the Guinness Book of Records as the longest running actor in a one-hour long television series for his performance as Heiji, and is still considered one of the most popular Japanese film stars of all time.

== Filmography ==
=== Films ===
| Release | Title | Role | Series |
|---|---|---|---|
| 1955.12.04 | A Warrior's Flute (笛吹若武者) | Taira no Atsumori (平敦盛) | |
| 1955.12.28 | Bored Hatamoto: Riddle of the Duel Challenge (旗本退屈男 謎の決闘状) | Hanji (半次) | Bored Hatamoto [07] (旗本退屈男) |
| 1956.02.25 | Case of Young Lord 1 (若さま侍捕物手帖 地獄の皿屋敷) | Young Lord (若さま) | Case of Young Lord [01] (若さま侍捕物手帖) |
| 1956.02.25 | Case of Young Lord 2 (若さま侍捕物手帖 べらんめえ活人剣) | Young Lord (若さま) | Case of Young Lord [02] (若さま侍捕物手帖) |
| 1956.05.11 | The Happy Wanderer (おしどり囃子) | Kikuji (菊次) | |
| 1956.05.24 | Kingdom of Edo Part 1 (江戸三国志 第一篇) | Mantarō Tokugawa (徳川万太郎) | Kingdom of Edo [1] (江戸三国志) |
| 1956.06.01 | Kingdom of Edo Part 2 (江戸三国志 疾風篇) | Mantarō Tokugawa (徳川万太郎) | Kingdom of Edo [2] (江戸三国志) |
| 1956.06.08 | Kingdom of Edo Part 3 (江戸三国志 完結迅雷篇) | Mantarō Tokugawa (徳川万太郎) | Kingdom of Edo [3] (江戸三国志) |
| 1956.06.21 | Case of Young Lord 3 (若様侍捕物帳 魔の死美人屋敷) | Young Lord (若さま侍) | Case of Young Lord [03] (若さま侍捕物手帖) |
| 1956.08.22 | Revenge Comes Disguised (復讐侠艶録) | Kin (Daihachi Yamagata) (錦（山県大八）) | |
| 1956.09.11 | Stones From the Sea (海の百万石) | Yōzō (要蔵) | |
| 1956.10.09 | Scramble For Fortune (ふり袖太平記) | Shintarō Tsuyuki (露木新太郎) | |
| 1956.10.17 | Avenging Father (曽我兄弟 富士の夜襲) | Kagetoki Kajiwara (梶原景時) | |
| 1956.11.07 | Mysteries of Edo (ふり袖捕物帖 若衆変化) | Genjirō Kawashima / Genjirō Terao (川島源次郎／寺尾源次郎) | |
| 1956.11.20 | Against The Grain (朱鞘罷り通る) | Nakazō Nakamura (中村仲蔵) | |
| 1956.12.26 | The Seven Vows Part 1 (新諸国物語 七つの誓い 黒水仙の巻) | Yuzukimaru (夕月丸) | The Seven Vows [1] (新諸国物語 七つの誓い) |
| 1957.01.03 | The Seven Vows Part 2 (新諸国物語 七つの誓い 奴隷船の巻) | Yuzukimaru (夕月丸) | The Seven Vows [2] (新諸国物語 七つの誓い) |
| 1957.01.03 | Port of Honor (任侠清水港) | Oiwake no Sangorō (追分の三五郎) | |
| 1957.01.09 | The Seven Vows Part 3 (新諸国物語 七つの誓い 凱旋歌の巻) | Yuzukimaru (夕月丸) | The Seven Vows [3] (新諸国物語 七つの誓い) |
| 1957.01.09 | Fighting Festival in Edo (大江戸喧嘩纏) | Shinza (新三) | |
| 1957.02.05 | Bird of Chaos (修羅時鳥) | Sōtarō Gin (銀荘太郎) | |
| 1957.03.04 | Case of Young Lord 4 (若さま侍捕物帳 鮮血の晴着) | Young Lord (若さま) | Case of Young Lord [04] (若さま侍捕物手帖) |
| 1957.04.02 | Case of Young Lord 5 (若さま侍捕物帳 深夜の死美人) | Young Lord (若さま) | Case of Young Lord [05] (若さま侍捕物手帖) |
| 1957.05.12 | The Fighting Man on the Trail (喧嘩道中) | Kusama no Hanjirō (草間の半次郎) | Hanjiro of Kusama [1] (草間の半次郎) |
| 1957.05.28 | Two Rulers (ふたり大名) | Yata / Yoshimitsu Rokugō (彌太／六郷義光) | |
| 1957.07.02 | Red Peony (緋ぼたん肌) | Genjirō Ōkusa (大草源次郎) | |
| 1957.08.11 | Lord Mito (水戸黄門) | Kakunoshin Atsumi (渥美格之進) | Lord Mito [1] (水戸黄門) |
| 1957.09.01 | The Drum (ふり袖太鼓) | Nawanosuke Kikuchi (菊池畷之介) | |
| 1957.09.29 | Case of Young Lord 6 (若さま侍捕物帳 鮮血の人魚) | Young Lord (若さま) | Case of Young Lord [06] (若さま侍捕物手帖) |
| 1957.11.17 | Falcon Magistrate (はやぶさ奉行) | Kyōtō Nezumi (侠盗ねずみ) | |
| 1957.12.28 | Woman of Mettle (花吹雪 鉄火纏) | Nigumi no Chōji (に組の長次) | |
| 1958.01.03 | A Chivalrous Spirit (任侠東海道) | Masukawa no Senemon (増川の仙右ヱ門) | |
| 1958.01.29 | The Scarlet Cherry Lord (緋ざくら大名) | Chiyosaburō Matsudaira (松平千代三郎) | |
| 1958.03.18 | Tange Sazen (丹下左膳) | Genzaburō Yagyū (柳生源三郎) | Tange Sazen [1] (丹下左膳) |
| 1958.04.01 | Her Son Came Back (旅笠道中) | Kusama no Hanjirō (草間の半次郎) | Hanjiro of Kusama [2] (草間の半次郎) |
| 1958.04.30 | Seven From Edo (大江戸七人衆) | Sōshirō Akizuki (秋月荘四郎) | |
| 1958.06.03 | The Young Boss (花笠若衆) | Matsunojō Kōzuki (神月又之丞) | |
| 1958.07.30 | The Lord's Thousand Ryo Umbrella (若君千両傘) | Jōtarō Tadamasa Honda (本田城太郎忠昌) | |
| 1958.08.12 | Bored Hatamoto Tribute (旗本退屈男) | Shinbei Minobe (美濃部新兵ヱ) | Bored Hatamoto [11] (旗本退屈男) |
| 1958.09.16 | The Envoy (不知火小僧評判記 鳴門飛脚) | Shiranui no Shinza (不知火の新三) | |
| 1958.10.14 | Drenched Swallow Gonpachi (濡れ燕 くれない権八) | Gonpachi Kurenai (紅権八) | |
| 1958.11.11 | Devastation (修羅八荒) | Takitarō Miwa (三輪滝太郎) | |
| 1958.12.15 | Case of Young Lord 7 (若さま侍捕物帖 紅鶴屋敷) | Young Lord (若さま) | Case of Young Lord [07] (若さま侍捕物手帖) |
| 1958.12.27 | Fighting Disposition (喧嘩笠) | Eijirō Ōmaeda (大前田栄次郎) | |
| 1959.01.03 | Tange Sazen: The Mystery of the Twin Dragons (丹下左膳 怒濤篇) | Daisaku Ibuki (伊吹大作) | Tange Sazen [2] (丹下左膳) |
| 1959.01.15 | Forty-Seven Masterless Samurai (忠臣蔵 桜花の巻 菊花の巻) | Kinemon Okano (岡野金右ヱ門) | |
| 1959.03.17 | Ten Duels of Young Shingo: Part I (新吾十番勝負) | Yorikata Matsudaira / Shingo Aoi (松平頼方／葵新吾) | Shingo Aoi [1] (葵新吾) |
| 1959.04.22 | Happily Tied To The Road (おしどり道中) | Kusama no Hanjirō (草間の半次郎) | Hanjiro of Kusama [3] (草間の半次郎) |
| 1959.05.05 | No Stronger Swords (風流使者 天下無双の剣) | Jirōkichi Inabaya (稲葉屋次郎吉) | |
| 1959.06.09 | The Secret Envoy (紅顏の密使) | Oda no Takemaro (小田の武麿) | |
| 1959.07.12 | Lord Mito 2 (水戸黄門 天下の副将軍) | Inokichi (伊之吉) | Lord Mito [2] (水戸黄門) |
| 1959.08.09 | A Spectacular Showdown (血闘水滸伝 怒濤の対決) | Nadare no Iwamatsu (雪崩の岩松) | |
| 1959.08.19 | Ten Duels of Young Shingo: Part II (新吾十番勝負 第二部) | Shingo Aoi (葵新吾) | Shingo Aoi [2] (葵新吾) |
| 1959.09.20 | Echo in the Mountains (恋山彦) | Ina no Kogenta / Munisai Shimazaki (伊那の小源太／島崎無二斎) | |
| 1959.10.11 | Bloody Battle at Dawn (天下の伊賀越 暁の血戦) | Dainaiki Honda (本多大内記) | |
| 1959.11.01 | Bloodied Spear (血槍無双) | Juheiji Sugino (杉野十平次) | |
| 1959.12.25 | Handsome Disguise (雪之丞変化) | Yukinojō Nakamura / Yamitarō / Seizaemon Matsuuraya (中村雪之丞／闇太郎／松浦屋清左衛門) | |
| 1960.01.03 | Road of Chivalry (任侠中仙道) | Takei no Asajirō (武井の浅二郎) | |
| 1960.01.15 | Tange Sazen: The Mysterious Sword (丹下左膳 妖刀濡れ燕) | Gennosuke Sōma (相馬源之助) | Tange Sazen [3] (丹下左膳) |
| 1960.02.07 | Chivalrous Child of Edo (大江戸の侠児) | Nezumi Kozō Jirōkichi (鼠小僧次郎吉) | |
| 1960.03.27 | Ten Duels of Young Shingo: Part III (新吾十番勝負 第三部) | Shingo Aoi (葵新吾) | Shingo Aoi [3] (葵新吾) |
| 1960.04.16 | Ten Duels of Young Shingo: Saga Conclusion (新吾十番勝負 完結篇) | Shingo Aoi (葵新吾) | Shingo Aoi [4] (葵新吾) |
| 1960.05.29 | Hanjiro of Kusama: Wanderer in the Mist (草間の半次郎 霧の中の渡り鳥) | Kusama no Hanjirō (草間の半次郎) | Hanjiro of Kusama [4] (草間の半次郎) |
| 1960.07.10 | Shinsengumi: Last Days of the Shogunate (壮烈新選組 幕末の動乱) | Orinosuke Tajima (但馬織之助) | |
| 1960.07.31 | The Newcomer to Shimizu (清水港に来た男) | Masakichi (Masanoshin Atobe) (政吉（跡部政之進）) | |
| 1960.08.07 | Lord Mito: All Star Version (水戸黄門) | Chūjō Tsunaeda Mito (水戸中将綱条) | Lord Mito [3] (水戸黄門) |
| 1960.09.18 | The Pirates (海賊八幡船) | Rokumon Isono (磯野鹿門) | |
| 1960.10.30 | Castle of Flames (炎の城) | Masato Ōmi (王見正人) | |
| 1960.12.27 | Case of Young Lord 8 (若さま侍捕物帖) | Young Lord (若さま) | Case of Young Lord [08] (若さま侍捕物手帖) |
| 1961.01.03 | Shingo's Challenge (新吾二十番勝負) | Shingo Aoi (葵新吾) | Shingo Aoi [5] (葵新吾) |
| 1961.01.15 | Case of Umon: The Nanbanzame Murders (右門捕物帖 南蛮鮫) | Yokichi (与吉) | |
| 1961.02.07 | Edo Purebred (江戸っ子肌) | Kichigorō (吉五郎) | |
| 1961.03.28 | The Ako Retainers (赤穂浪士) | Takumi-no-kami Asano (浅野内匠頭) | |
| 1961.04.09 | Young Warrior on Mt. Fuji (富士に立つ若武者) | Minamoto no Yoritomo (源頼朝) | |
| 1961.04.25 | Mask of the Moon (月形半平太) | Hanpeita Tsukigata (月形半平太) | |
| 1961.05.03 | Tange Sazen and the Princess (丹下左膳 濡れ燕一刀流) | Genzaburō Yagyū (柳生源三郎) | Tange Sazen [4] (丹下左膳) |
| 1961.06.11 | Young Lord Yakuza (橋蔵の若様やくざ) | Taihei (鯛平) | Young Lord Yakuza [1] (若様やくざ) |
| 1961.07.09 | Shingo's Challenge Part II (新吾二十番勝負 第二部) | Shingo Aoi (葵新吾) | Shingo Aoi [6] (葵新吾) |
| 1961.08.13 | Law in Ghost Land (幽霊島の掟) | Hanzō Yagi (八木半蔵) | |
| 1961.09.23 | Case of Young Lord 9 (若さま侍捕物帳 黒い椿) | Young Lord (若さま) | Case of Young Lord [09] (若さま侍捕物手帖) |
| 1961.12.24 | The Red Shadow (赤い影法師) | Waka-kage (若影) | |
| 1962.01.14 | Good Rascals (大江戸評判記 美男の顔役) | Ichinojō Kaneko (金子市之丞) | |
| 1962.03.21 | The Christian Revolt (天草四郎時貞) | Shirō Tokisada Amakusa (天草四郎時貞) | |
| 1962.05.01 | The Mad Fox (恋や恋なすな恋) | Yasuna Abe (阿倍保名) | |
| 1962.07.13 | Yakuza Official (橋蔵のやくざ判官) | Bunkichi (文吉) | |
| 1962.08.12 | The Phantom Goblin (まぼろし天狗) | Kyōnosuke Asakawa / Shūma Moriya (浅川喬之助／守屋周馬) | |
| 1962.10.12 | Mark of Blood (血煙り笠) | Tsubakuro no Fujitarō (つばくろの藤太郎) | |
| 1962.11.02 | Tengu Priest (お坊主天狗) | Shinzaburō Akibaya (秋葉屋新三郎) | |
| 1962.11.11 | Mansion of the Blood Curse (血文字屋敷) | Echizen-no-kami Ōoka (大岡越前守) | |
| 1962.12.01 | The Paper Crane (花の折鶴笠) | Toma no Hantarō (苫の半太郎) | |
| 1962.12.23 | Case of Young Lord 10 (若さま侍捕物帳 お化粧蜘蛛) | Young Lord (若さま) | Case of Young Lord [10] (若さま侍捕物手帖) |
| 1963.01.03 | Tokaido Full House (勢揃い東海道) | Kira no Nikichi (吉良の仁吉) | |
| 1963.02.10 | Tattoo of Love (いれずみ半太郎) | Hantarō (半太郎) | |
| 1963.04.21 | This Head is Wanted for 10,000 Goku (この首一万石) | Yari no Gonzō (槍の権三) | |
| 1963.06.22 | Three Outlaws (用心棒市場) | Akane no Yanokichi (あかねの弥之吉) | |
| 1963.07.13 | Shingo's Challenge Part III (新吾二十番勝負 完結篇) | Shingo Aoi (葵新吾) | Shingo Aoi [7] (葵新吾) |
| 1963.09.21 | Young Lord Yakuza: Edo Tengu (若様やくざ 江戸っ子天狗) | Gennojō Kageyama (影山源之丞) | Young Lord Yakuza [2] (若様やくざ) |
| 1963.11.20 | Ukyonosuke On Patrol (右京之介巡察記) | Denemon Sena / Ukyōnosuke Murasaki (Ichitarō Sena) (瀬名伝右衛門／紫右京之介（瀬名市太郎）) | Ukyonosuke Murasaki [1] (紫右京之介) |
| 1964.01.09 | Vanquished Foes (人斬り笠) | Hayate no Fujitarō (疾風の藤太郎) | |
| 1964.01.15 | Warrior of the Wind (風の武士) | Shinzō Nabari (名張信蔵) | |
| 1964.03.12 | Ukyonosuke's Reverse Ichimonji Cut (紫右京之介 逆一文字斬り) | Ukyōnosuke Murasaki (紫右京之介) | Ukyonosuke Murasaki [2] (紫右京之介) |
| 1964.05.23 | Shingo's Greatest Duel (新吾番外勝負) | Shingo Aoi (葵新吾) | Shingo Aoi [8] (葵新吾) |
| 1964.08.13 | The Shogun's Vault (御金蔵破り) | Hanji (判次) | |
| 1964.09.05 | The Great Duel (大喧嘩) | Haruna no Shūjirō (榛名の秀次郎) | |
| 1964.12.12 | Cruelty of Shogunate's Downfall (幕末残酷物語) | Saburō Eba (江波三郎) | |
| 1964.12.24 | The Thief in Black (黒の盗賊) | Kotarō Musashi / Jirō Tachibana (武蔵小太郎／立花次郎) | |
| 1965.02.13 | War of Roses (バラケツ勝負) | Hisao Takemura (武村久雄) | |
| 1965.05.08 | The Grand Contest (大勝負) | Mitake no Sentarō (御嶽の仙太郎) | |
| 1965.06.27 | The Third Contest (主水之介三番勝負) | Mondonosuke Yumedono (夢殿主水之介) | |
| 1965.08.01 | Chivalrous Nature (任侠木曽鴉) | Matsudo no Shinta (松戸の新太) | |
| 1965.10.24 | Breaking Down The Magistrate (天保遊侠伝 代官所破り) | Sasagawa no Shigezō (笹川の繁造) | |
| 1966.03.10 | Hatamoto Yakuza (旗本やくざ) | Chōnome no Sanji (丁の目の三次) | |
| 1967.10.10 | Heiji, The Detective (銭形平次) | Heiji Zenigata (銭形平次) | |
| 1981.04.11 | Chanbara Graffiti (Note: Commemorating the 30th anniversary of the founding of Toei Studios, this anthology film is composed of famous scenes from 95 important Jidaigeki chanbara films released between 1922 and 1978. Four stars of the genre, Chiezo Kataoka, Utaemon Ichikawa, Kinnosuke Yorozuya, and Hashizo Okawa relive their memories of these films via interviews.) (ちゃんばらグラフィティー 斬る!) | Himself (本人) | |

=== Television ===
| Airdate | Title | Type | Role |
|---|---|---|---|
| 1966.05.04 - 1984.04.04 | Heiji, The Detective (銭形平次) | TV series - 888 episodes | Heiji Zenigata (銭形平次) |
| 1981.04.17 | Tokijiro Kutsukake (沓掛時次郎〜この愛に命をかけた流れ旅) | TV movie | Tokijiro Kutsukake (沓掛時次郎) |
| 1982.05.14 | Mataemon Araki's Duel at Kagiya no Tsuji (荒木又右衛門 決闘鍵屋の辻) | TV movie | Mataemon Araki (荒木又右衛門) |
| 1983.04.20 | Ginpei from Koina: Migratory Bird of Winter (雪の渡り鳥 鯉名の銀平) | TV movie | Ginpei from Koina (鯉名の銀平) |
| 1984.05.02 - 1984.06.06 | Yumie Hiraiwa Drama Series: Chōchō-san and Her Sons (平岩弓枝ドラマシリーズ 蝶々さんと息子たち) | TV series - 6 episodes | |
