= The Mad Fox =

1962 Japanese film

- Film poster
- Directed by: Tomu Uchida
- Written by: Yoshikata Yoda
- Starring: Hashizo Okawa; Michiko Saga; Ryūnosuke Tsukigata
- Cinematography: Sadaji Yoshida
- Edited by: Shintarō Miyamoto
- Music by: Chuji Kinoshita
- Production company: Toei Company
- Distributed by: Toei Company
- Release date: 1 May 1962 (Japan)
- Running time: 109 minutes
- Country: Japan
- Language: Japanese

The Mad Fox (Japanese: 恋や恋なすな恋, Hepburn: Koiya koi nasuna koi), also titled Love, Thy Name Be Sorrow, is a 1962 Japanese jidaigeki and drama film directed by Tomu Uchida. It is based upon a 1734 bunraku play.

== Plot ==
During Heian period, well-renowned fortune-teller Kamo no Yasunori reads his oracle scroll The Golden Crow and learns he should adopt a particular girl. His two disciples, Abe no Yasuna and Absiya Doman, search separately for this girl. Yasuna discovers identical twin girls born to Lord Shoji of Izumi at the correct time and returns with the older one, Sakaki.

Ten years later strange omens and The Golden Crow tell Yasunori that the heirless crown prince is cursed and the country will soon be in turmoil. A second prediction is made but Yasunori can tell this only to his successor. Doman arrives late, saying he went to the royal court to urge them to consult with Yasunori. This action was disrespectful and Yasunori publicly denounces Doman and says Doman will not be his successor. Yasunori starts a journey to the Imperial Court. Yasunori's wife lusts after Doman and has her husband killed on the road blaming the murder on bandits.

Without a formal succession document Sakaki realises that the Court will appoint Doman as successor. As she loves Yasuna she intrigues against Doman by appearing at Court as heir of her adopted father and the Court declares that lots shall be cast to determine the successor. However, when Sakaki opens the locked box that should contain The Golden Crow the box is empty. Suspicion is cast all around. Doman imprisons Yasuna and tortures Sakaki to death. Yasunori's widow privately confesses to Doman that she stole the scroll to help him succeed and she initiates an affair with him. Yasuna escapes, finding Sakaki dead and overhearing the deceitful plan he goes mad and attacks the conspirators. Yasunori's widow dies in a fire and Yasuna escapes with The Golden Crow scroll.

Wandering madly wearing both his and Sakaki's clothes, Yasuna ends up in Izumi where he sees Sakaki's identical twin sister Kuzunoha. Lord Shoji takes him in and the family overlook his mistaken belief that Kuzunoha is Sakaki. Yasuna does not believe himself mad and wonders why Shoji does not yet permit them to wed.

At court Doman says he saw a little of The Golden Crow which said the Crown Prince's curse could be lifted by the prince siring an heir by copulating in a room adorned with the blood of a white vixen. A court minister says a white vixen exists in Izumi and a hunting party is despatched. The hunt takes places in a forest where Yasuna is walking with Kuzunoha. They come across an injured old woman from out of whom Yasuna pulls an arrow. The hunting party arrives and ask if the trio have seen the white fox they have shot but Yasuna calls them idiots who can't tell the difference between a fox and a human. Kuzunoha and Yasuna escort the old lady to her hut. After the young couple depart the old lady, her husband and their granddaughter, Kon, are revealed to be kitsune. In gratitude Kon is ordered to look after Yasuna.

Doman sees that Yasuna has the scroll and with the hunting party he attacks and takes the scroll. Travelling first as balls of flame, Kon's clan arrives. The kitsune fight off the hunting party and make off with the scroll while Yasuna and Kuzunoha are separated. Kon is ordered to shapechange into Kuzunoha's form while she tends to Yasuna's injuries (which she initially does by licking his wounds). Kon is warned not to do anything which might permanently isolate herself from her own kind.

However, Kon had fallen in love with Yasuna at first sight. She remains in Kuzunoha's form and, with Yasuna still believing her to be Sakaki, the pair live in a small isolated hut and have a child together. Kon dreads the day she must return the scroll to him as on that day they must part. Some wandering men see Kon and soon Lord Shoji arrives at the hut with his wife and Kuzunoha who is lovesick for Yasuna. Shoji, Shoji's wife and Yasuna become confused at seeing two identical women: Kon and Kuzunoha. Kon admits to being inhuman and says she will leave their child with Yasuna. She departs in the form of a white vixen and their hut disappears leaving Yasuna wondering if it was just a dream.

Upon picking up their child, he finds The Golden Crow but the scene instantly changes to reprise the scene where Yasuna was alone and wandering madly after Sakaki's murder. He lies upon the ground in foetal position wearing Sakaki's kimono. The scene changes to a Sessho-seki, roughly the size of a human adult lying in foetal position, with a flame looking like that in which the kitsune appeared floating around it. A narrator admonishes the audience that love is empty and never to fall in love.

== Cast ==
- Hashizo Okawa as Abe Yasuna
- Michiko Saga as Sakaki, Kuzuno and Kon
- Junya Usami as Yasunori Kamo
- Choichiro Kawarasaki
- Yoshi Katō as Shōji
- Kensaku Hara as Nakahira Fujiwara
- Eijirō Yanagi as Tadahira Fujiwara
- Ryūnosuke Tsukigata

== Legacy ==
The Mad Fox was screened in the Museum of Modern Art as part of a retrospective on Tomu Uchida in 2016.
