= Chūkon giretsu: Jitsuroku Chūshingura =

1928 film

Jitsuroku Chūshingura
- Directed by: Shozo Makino
- Produced by: Makino Production
- Starring: Yoho Ii; Tsuzuya Moroguchi; Kobunji Ichikawa; Yotaro Katsumi
- Narrated by: Shunsui Matsuda; Midori Sawato
- Cinematography: Juzo Tanaka
- Distributed by: Digital Meme
- Release date: 1928 (Japan)
- Running time: 64 minutes
- Country: Japan
- Language: Japanese (intertitles)

Chūkon giretsu: Jitsuroku Chūshingura (忠魂義烈 実録忠臣蔵, Heroism of the Faithful Dead: True Testament of the Chūshingura) is a 1928 Japanese black-and-white silent film with benshi accompaniment directed by Shozo Makino. It was an epic created to commemorate Makino's 50th birthday and is based on the classic theme of the Chūshingura. During the production of this film, a fire broke out, destroying parts of the original film, but it has since been restored.

== Cast ==
- Ii Yōhō - Ōishi "Kuranosuke" Yoshio
- Moroguchi Tsuzuya - Asano Takumi-no-kami
- Ichikawa Kobunji - Kira "Kōzukenosuke" Yoshihisa
- Katsumi Yōtarō - Tachibana Sakon
- Tsukigata Ryūnosuke - Shimizu Ikkaku
- Nakano Ryūtarō - Matsuno Kawachi no Kami
- Arashi Nagasaburō - Wakisaka Awaji-no-kami
- Kataoka Chiezō - Inspector Hattori Ichiroemon
- Kataoka Ichitarō - Imperial envoy Yanagihara-ken Dainagon
- Sugi Kyōji - The loyal maid Kengo no Ogen
- Nakane Ryūtarō - 伜 与太九呂
- Makino Masahiro - Ōishi "Chikara" Yoshikane
- Kojima Yōzō - Shogun Tokugawa
- Matsumoto Tokinosuke - Asano Daigaku
- Nakamura Tonosuke - Tamura Ukyō-Tayū
- Koiwai Shōzaburō - Date Sakyonosuke
- Yamamoto Reizaburō - Kajikawa Yosōbei
- Kaneko Shin - Imperial envoy Takano Chūnagon
- Ishikawa Koenji - Imperial envoy Seikan Chūnagon
- Matsumura Mitsuo - Mon Ryōsetsu
- Araki Shinobu - Kira's spy Maeno Heinai
- Kawada Kōdō - Kira's spy Saruhashi Umon
- Kikunami Shōnosuke - Ōishi's servant Mankichi, actually Kira's spy.
- Akiyoshi Kaoru - Kira's spy Ishitsuka Jinpachi
- Nakata Kuniyoshi - Seppuku envoy Tashimo Sogami
- Wakamatsu Fumio - Inspector Okada-den-hachirō
- Shizuma Seinosuke - Kaishaku
- Umeda Gorō - Tea master Hirai Chōan
- Morimoto Senichi - Ishido (Tamura's retainer)
- Ōaji Masanori - Sakakibara (Tamura's retainer)
- Saitō Shunpei - Takami Kageyu (Tamura's retainer)
- Kojima Takehiko - Tairō Yanagisawa Mino-no-kami
- Ōtani Manroku - Taikomochi Senju
- Tsuga Senji - Ōishi's servant Hachidou
- Matsuo Fumindo - second son of Ōishi Chiyomatsu
- Tsuga Kazushi - third son of Ōishi Daisaburō
- Tsumura Hiroshi - younger brother of Shimizu Ikkaku
- Onoe Shōroku - Kira's spy Makiyama Daigorō
- Fujii Rokusuke - Soba shop owner Shizuke
- Ōkuni Ikkō - Kira's retainer Kazuhisa Gyūtaro
- Makino Masami - 吉良左兵衛之介
- Kojima Takehiko - Sugano's father Shichirōzaemon
- Arashi Kan - The spy's son Jūtarō
- Somei Tatsurō - Horibe "Yahei" Kanemaru
- Matsumura Mitsuo - Horibe "Kihei" Mitsunobu
- Wakamatsu Fumio - Yoshida Chūzaemon
- Arashi Kankichiro - Mase "Kyūtayū" Masaaki
- Harada Kōzō - Murase Kihei Hidemichi
- Ōaji Masanori - Onodera "Jūnai" Hidekazu
- Yanazuma Reizaburō - Okuda "Magotayu" Shigemori
- Nakamura Tonosuke - Hara "Soemon" Mototoki
- Matsumoto Kumao - Kaiga "Yazaemon" Tomonobu
- Saigō Noboru - Chiba "Saburobei" Mitsutada
- Nanbu Kunio - Kimura "Okaemon" Sadayuki
- Kimura Takeshi - Nakamura "Kansuke" Musatoki
- Mori Kiyoshi - Sugaya "Hannoji" Masatoshi
- Ōdani Kijyuku - Hayami "Tozaemon" Mitsutaka
- Tachibana Masaaki - Maehara "Isuke" Munefusa
- Arashi Nagasaburō - Terasaka "Kichiemon" Nobuyuki
- Hoshizuki Einosuke - Tsuneki "Yasouemon" Okajima
- Ichikawa Koenji - Kanzaki "Yogoro" Noriyasu
- Yano Takeo - Kayano "Kazusuke" Tsunenari
- Ichikawa Kobunji - Kataoka "Gengoemon" Takafusa
- Toshima Ryūhei - Yokogawa "Kanpei" Munetoshi
- Koiwai Shōzaburō - Mimura "Jirozaemon" Kanetsune
- Kaneko Shin - Ushioda "Matanojō" Takanori (Đông du ký)
- Tōgō Hisayoshi - Akahani "Genzo" Shigekata
- Yamamoto Reizaburō - Horibe "Yasubei" Takeyoshi
- Sakuma Hachirō - Fuwa "Kazueimon" Masatane
- Ei Masaru - Chikamatsu "Kanroku" Yukishige
- Sakamoto Jirō - Tominomori "Sukeemon" Masayori
- Sawamura Kinnosuke - Kurahashi "Densuke" Takeyuki
- Takei Ryūzō - Takebayashi "Yuishichi" Takashige
- Amano Haichi - Ōtaka "Gengo" Tadao
- Yakumo Ennosuke - Yoshida "Sawauemon" Kanesada
- Suzuki Kyōhei - Yada "Gorōemon" Suketake
- Kataoka Chiezō - Kayano Sanpei
- Ichikawa Yagorō - Onodera "Koemon" Hidetomi
- Kawashima Kiyoshi - Sugino "Jūhei" Tsugufusa
- Fujioka Masayoshi - Ōishi "Sezaemon" Nobukiyo
- Maki Mitsurō - Muramatsu "Sandayū" Takanao
- Kayano Shigezane - 奥田貞右衛門行高
- Koganei Masaru - Hazama "Jujiro" Mitsuoki
- Matsuzaka Susumu - Isogai "Jurozaemon" Masahisa
- Ichihara Yoshio - Okano "Kinemon" Kanehide
- Makino Tōroku - Hazama Shinroku
- Kuka Ryūzaburō - Katsuta "Shinzaemon" Taketake
- Ushio Ryūji - Mase "Magokurō" Machitoki
- Makino Umetarō - Yatō "Emoshichi" Norikane
- Onoe Shōroku - Ōno Kurobei
- Ōtani Manroku - Imperial envoy Tamamushi Shichirōemon
- Tokugawa Ryōnosuke - Imperial envoy Kondō Genpachi
- Morimoto Senichi - Imperial envoy Fujii Hikoshiro
- Arao Seiisa - Imperial envoy Hayakawa Sosuke
- Takayama Hisashi - Imperial envoy Tanaka Seibei
- Arashi Kanzaburō - Toyota Hattayū
- Onoe Nobuzaburo - Toyota Shōsuke
- Tamaki Utako - Yōzen-in, the second wife of Yōsenin
- Hanaoka Yuriko - 戸田の局
- Ishikawa Shinsui - Ōishi's room, Oriku
- Makino Tomoko - Chika, daughter of Hayamizu Tozaemon
- Matsuura Tsukie - 浮橋太夫
- Watanabe Ayako - 軽藻太夫
- Suminoe Tatsuko - Yoshinotayū
- Miho Matsuko - Maid Okaji
- Kawakami Kimie - Kira's maid Myoka
- Mizutani Ranko - The older sister of the soba shop owner Otomi
- Okajima Tsuyako - Sanpei's new wife Tsuyuno
- Suzuki Sumiko - Shimizu Ikkaku's sister
- Ōbayashi Umeko - Kira's spy Oume
- Isogawa Suzuko - Yoshiko, the boatman of the floating bridge
- Tsuga Shizuko - 浮橋の引舟田毎
- Hirota Kō - Mukadeya Yosuke
- Tamaki Junichirō - Armor maker Tamegoro
- Ōoka Kaidō - Togiya Denkurō
- Ōkuni Ikkō - Sengoro the crazy shopkeeper
