= Dai-bosatsu tōge =

Dai-bosatsu tōge (大菩薩峠) is:

- A serial novel of the same title by Kaizan Nakazato (in Japanese), whose adaptations include:
  - 大菩薩峠 Dai-bosatsu tōge (1957 film)
  - 大菩薩峠 Satan's Sword, a 1960 film and the first in a trilogy
  - The Sword of Doom, a 1966 film
