= Kojiki Taishō =

Fictional samurai novel

- Author: Jirō Osaragi
- Original title: 乞食大将 (Kojiki Taishō)
- Language: Japanese
- Publisher: Kurakusha
- Publication date: 1947
- Publication place: Japan

Kojiki Taishō (乞食大将, Kojiki Taishō) is a jidaigeki novel written by Jirō Osaragi in 1945. The novel deals with the warlord Gotō Matabei's life during the Warring States period. The novel was adapted into film in 1952 and 1964.

== Plot ==
Gotō Matabei is the most able and fierce samurai of the Kuroda clan. However, he gradually dislikes the ruthless personality of Kuroda Nagamasa and leaves the clan. Seven years later, he joins Toyotomi Hideyori's army.

== Adaptations ==
=== Kojiki Taishō 1952 ===
Kojiki Taishō
- Directed by: Sadatsugu Matsuda
- Written by: Fuji Yahiro
- Starring: Utaemon Ichikawa; Ryūnosuke Tsukigata
- Cinematography: Yoshiaki Kiura
- Music by: Yoshinobu Shiraki
- Production company: Daiei
- Distributed by: Daiei
- Release date: April 3, 1952
- Running time: 62
- Country: Japan
- Language: Japanese

A Daiei production in 1952, Directed by Sadatsugu Matsuda.

- Utaemon Ichikawa as Gotō Matabei
- Ryūnosuke Tsukigata as Kuroda Nagamasa
- Yoshiko Nakamura as Maihime
- Masahiko Sawamura as Hanawaka
- Hideo Fujino as Tokugawa Ieyasu
- Ryōsuke Kagawa as Fukushima Tamba
- Mitsusaburō Ramon as Utsunomiya Shigefusa

=== Kojiki Taishō 1964 ===
Kojiki Taishō
- Directed by: Tokuzō Tanaka
- Written by: Fuji Yahiro
- Starring: Shintarō Katsu; Tomisaburō Wakayama; Masakazu Tamura
- Cinematography: Yoshiaki Kiura
- Music by: Akira Ifukube
- Production company: Daiei
- Distributed by: Daiei
- Release date: November 28, 1964
- Running time: 93
- Country: Japan
- Language: Japanese

A Daiei production in 1964, Directed by Tokuzō Tanaka and Music by Akira Ifukube.

- Shintarō Katsu as Gotō Matabei
- Tomisaburō Wakayama as Utsunomiya Shigefusa
- Jun Fujimaki as Kuroda Nagamasa
- Yukiko Fuji as Tsuruhime
- Nakajiro Tomita as Fukushima Masanori
- Shosaku Sugiyama as Honda Masanobu
- Ryuzo Shimada as Ikeda Terumasa
- Masakazu Tamura as Hanawaka
- Ryōsuke Kagawa as Fukushima Tamba
- Masao Shimizu as Tokugawa Ieyasu
