= Noroshi wa Shanghai ni Agaru =

- Film poster
- Directed by: Hiroshi Inagaki
- Written by: Ching Doe; Fuji Yahiro
- Starring: Tsumasaburō Bandō; Ryūnosuke Tsukigata; Tatsuya Ishiguro
- Release date: 28 December 1944 (Japan)
- Running time: 105 minutes
- Countries: Japan; China
- Language: Japanese

Noroshi wa Shanghai ni Agaru (Japanese: 狼煙は上海に揚る) is a 1944 Japanese historical film directed by Hiroshi Inagaki. The story centers on Takasugi Shinsaku's trip to China to foster alliances to resist Western imperialism in Asia. It was a Japan–China co-production made during the Japanese occupation of Shanghai during World War II.

== Cast ==
- Tsumasaburō Bandō as Shinsaku Takasugi
- Ryūnosuke Tsukigata as Saisuke Godai
- Tatsuya Ishiguro as Kuranosuke Nakamuta
- Ryōsuke Kagawa as Heirokurō Numata
- Ryōnosuke Azuma as Shakusaburō Ōtsuka
- Yoshimatsu Nakamura as Shen Yizhou
