= Dai-bosatsu tōge (1957 film) =

1957 Japanese film

- Japanese movie poster
- Directed by: Tomu Uchida
- Written by: Katsuhito Inomata; Eizaburo Shiba
- Based on: Dai-bosatsu tōge by Kaizan Nakazato
- Produced by: Hiroshi Okawa
- Starring: Chiezō Kataoka; Nakamura Kinnosuke; Yumiko Hasegawa; Denjirō Ōkōchi; Ryūnosuke Tsukigata
- Cinematography: Shigeto Miki
- Edited by: Shintarō Miyamoto
- Music by: Shirō Fukai
- Production company: Toei Company
- Distributed by: Toei Company
- Release date: 13 July 1957 (Japan)
- Running time: 119 minutes
- Country: Japan
- Language: Japanese

Dai-bosatsu tōge (Japanese: 大菩薩峠), also known as Swords in the Moonlight or Sword in the Moonlight, is a 1957 Japanese jidaigeki and drama film directed by Tomu Uchida. It is based on the novel of the same name by Kaizan Nakazato.

== Cast ==
- Chiezō Kataoka as Ryunosuke Tsukue
- Nakamura Kinnosuke as Hyoma Utsugi
- Ryūnosuke Tsukigata as Shichibei
- Yumiko Hasegawa as Ohama / Otoyo
- Satomi Oka as Omatsu
- Sumiko Hidaka as Otaki
- Denjirō Ōkōchi as Toranosuke Shimada

== Legacy ==
Dai-bosatsu tōge was screened in the Museum of Modern Art as part of a retrospective on Tomu Uchida in 2016.
