= Sadatsugu Matsuda =

Japanese director (1906–2003)

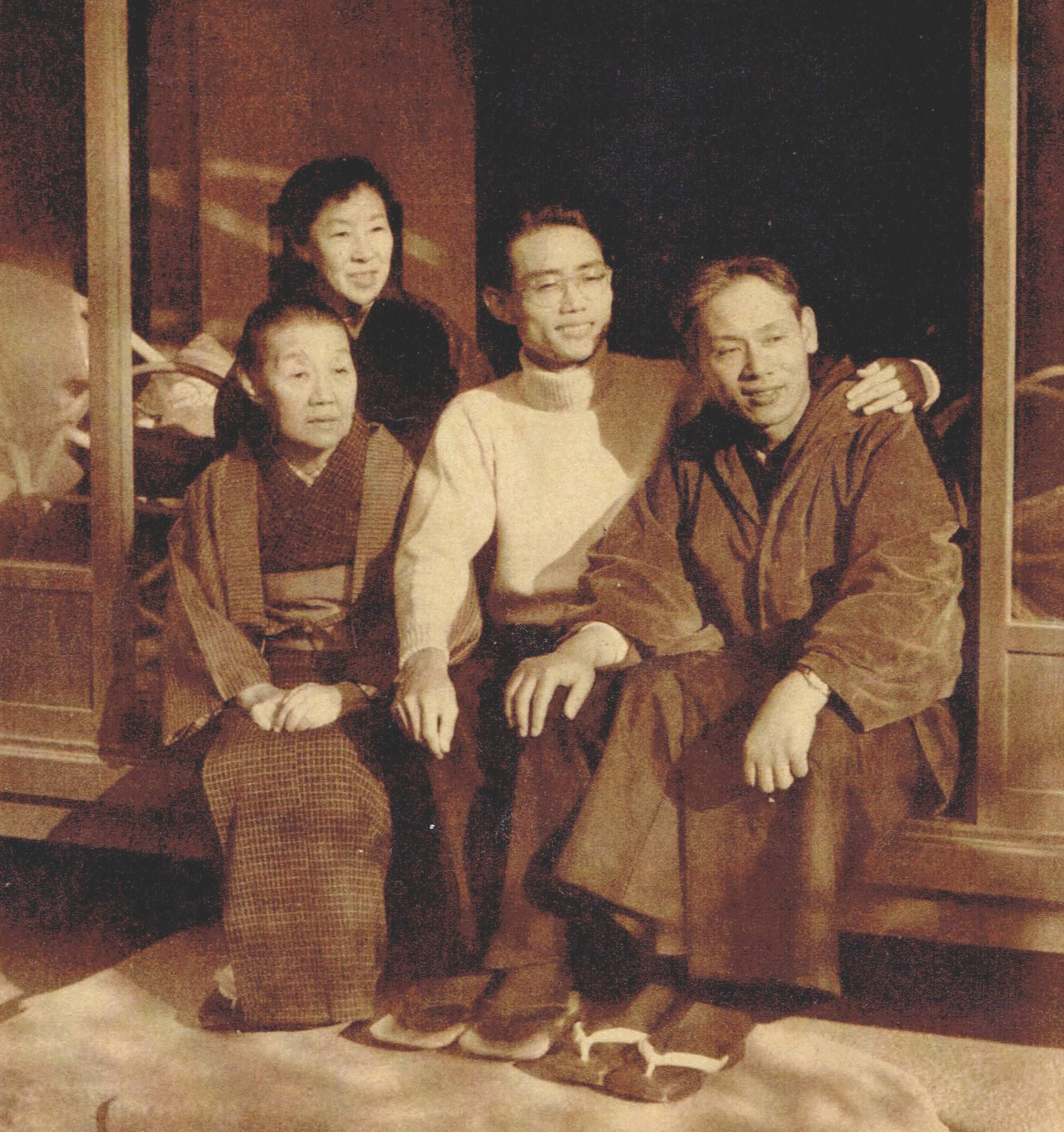
From the right: Sadatsugu Matsuda, Hiroo Matsuda, Tsukie Matsuura, Teru Matsuda (Shozo Makino's ex-wife)

Sadatsugu Matsuda (松田 定次, Matsuda Sadatsugu) (まつだ さだつぐ) (2 November 1906 – 20 January 2003, Tokyo, Japan) was a Japanese film director. He directed films from 1925 to 1969.

His name is also incorrectly spelled as Sadaji Matsuda.

He was the son of producer and director Shōzō Makino, and brother of film director Masahiro Makino

== Partial filmography ==
- Raiden (1928)
- Gokumon-to (獄門島) (1949)
- Kojiki Taishō (1952)
- Akō Rōshi: Ten no Maki, Chi no Maki (赤穂浪士 天の巻 地の巻) (1956)
- Ninkyō Shimizu-minato (任侠清水港) (1957)
- Akō Rōshi (赤穂浪士) (1961)
