= Satomi Oka =

Japanese actress (1935–2024)

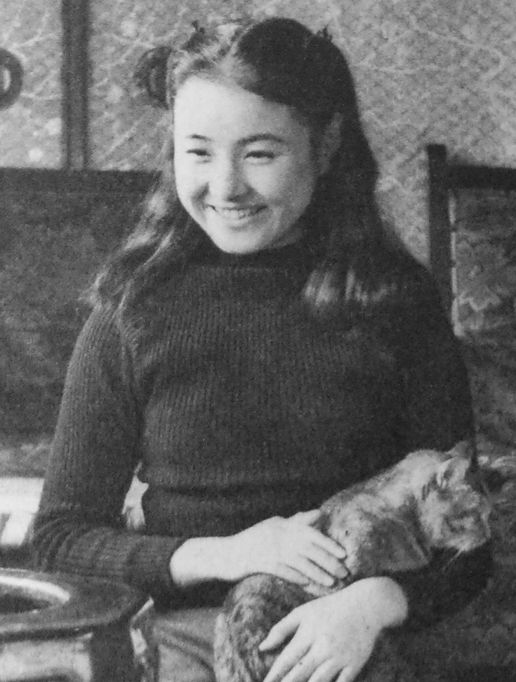

Satomi Oka (September 15, 1935 – April 24, 2024) was a Japanese actress. She made over 150 films in her career, including Miyamoto Musashi and Akō Rōshi.

== Life and career ==
Oka was born in Takarazuka-Shi, Hyōgo Prefecture, Japan on September 15, 1935. While attending Amagasaki High School in Amagasaki, Japan, she was selected as Miss Cinderella in 1953 for a “Japan Cinderella Princess Contest” held by RKO Radio & Film Company in conjunction with Mainichi Shinbun. Crowned as Miss Cinderella, Oka was invited to visit Hollywood and Disney Studios from March 20 to April 4, 1953. During her two-week visit, Oka was invited to visit and dine with actors such as Ann Blyth and Cary Grant. As this trip took place prior to the liberalization of foreign travel, it was then considered to be a valuable trip to Hollywood.

After high school, Oka worked as an office secretary at RKO Radio & Film Company before being scouted by Toei Studios in 1955. Debuting the same year in Shinsengumi’s The Black Hooded Seer, she quickly gained popularity and was referred to as Toei's "Princess" from the many roles she played as a heroine.

Oka died on April 24, 2024, at the age of 88.

== Selected filmography ==
- Dai-bosatsu tōge (1957)
- Naked Sun (1958)
- Akō Rōshi (赤穂浪士 Akō Rōshi) (1961)
- Bushido, Samurai Saga (1963)
