= Chiezō Kataoka =

Japanese actor (1903–1983)

- 片岡 千恵蔵
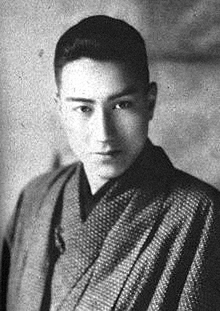
- Chiezō Kataoka in 1920s or 1930s
- Born: March 30, 1903; Gunma Prefecture, Japan
- Died: March 31, 1983 (aged 80)
- Occupation: Film actor
- Years active: 1912–1983

Masayoshi Ueki (植木 正義, Ueki Masayoshi; March 30, 1903 – March 31, 1983), known professionally as Chiezō Kataoka (片岡 千恵蔵, Kataoka Chiezō), was a Japanese film and television actor most famous for his starring roles in jidaigeki.

== Career ==
Born as Masayoshi Ueki in 1903, in Gunma Prefecture, he was raised in Tokyo. As a child he began training in Kabuki in a theatre troupe run by Kataoka Nizaemon XI, and appeared in one film in 1923. He eventually entered the movie world for good in 1927 first at Makino Productions, but following the lead of other former Makino stars like Tsumasaburō Bandō, Chiezō started his own independent production company, Chiezō Productions, the next year. That studio became the longest lasting of the independent, star-centered productions, in part because it had such talented directors as Mansaku Itami and Hiroshi Inagaki, and produced such masterworks as Akanishi Kakita. He folded the company in 1937 and joined Nikkatsu.

Specializing in jidaigeki, he played the lead in various films before and during World War II. During the Occupation of Japan, however, when Allied censors restricted the production of jidaigeki, Chiezō also appeared in a series of eleven films as Bannai Tarao, a modern era detective who is a master of disguise, and in seven films as Seishi Yokomizo's classic sleuth Kosuke Kindaichi. He eventually joined Toei, where he also served on the board of directors. Among his starring roles for Toei were eighteen films in which he played Tōyama no Kin-san and a three-part Daibosatsu Tōge. Another role was in Akō Rōshi, a drama based on the Forty-seven Ronin. Later, he portrayed the father of Ōoka Tadasuke in the television series Ōoka Echizen. His career spanned six decades.

== Family ==
His son, Yoshiharu Ueki, a former pilot, was named the president of Japan Airlines in January 2012.

== Filmography ==
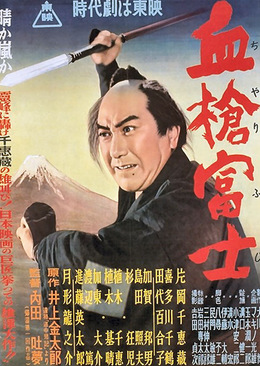
Chiezō Kataoka in the poster for Bloody Spear at Mount Fuji (1955).

- Chūkon giretsu: Jitsuroku Chūshingura (1928)
- The Peerless Patriot (国士無双 Kokushi musō) (1932)
- Akanishi Kakita (赤西蠣太) (1936)
- Singing Lovebirds (鴛鴦歌合戦 Oshidori utagassen) (1939)
- Bannai Tarao (多羅尾伴内 Tarao Bannai) (1946)
- Bloody Spear at Mount Fuji (血槍富士 Chiyari Fuji) (1955)
- The Kuroda Affair (Kuroda sōdō) (1956)
- Akō Rōshi: Ten no Maki, Chi no Maki (赤穂浪士 天の巻 地の巻) (1956)
- Ninkyō Shimizu-minato (任侠清水港 Ninkyō Shimizu-minato) (1957)
- Dai-bosatsu tōge (大菩薩峠) (1957)
- Kunisada Chūji (1958)
- Akō Rōshi (赤穂浪士 Akō Rōshi) (1961)
- Ōoka Echizen (TV series) (1970)
- Amigasa Jūbei (TV series) (1974), Nakane Masafuyu
- Sanada Yukimura no Bōryaku (1979), Sanada Masayuki

== Honours ==
- Medal with Purple Ribbon (1971)
- Order of the Rising Sun, 4th Class, Gold Rays with Rosette (1977)
