= Akō Rōshi (1961 film) =

1961 film

- Theatrical release poster
- Directed by: Sadatsugu Matsuda
- Written by: Hideo Oguni (writer); Kaneto Shindō (writer)
- Based on: Novel by Jirō Osaragi
- Produced by: Toei, Shigeru Okada (producer); Hiroshi Okawa (executive producer)
- Starring: Chiezō Kataoka; Nakamura Kinnosuke; Chiyonosuke Azuma; Hashizo Okawa; Jūshirō Konoe; Denjirō Ōkōchi; Ryūnosuke Tsukigata; Ryūtarō Ōtomo; Utaemon Ichikawa
- Cinematography: Shintarō Kawasaki
- Release date: 1961
- Running time: 150 minutes
- Country: Japan
- Language: Japanese

Akō Rōshi (Japanese: 赤穂浪士) is a 1961 color Japanese film about the 47 Ronin directed by Sadatsugu Matsuda. It earned ¥435 million at the annual box office, making it the second highest-grossing Japanese film of 1961. Akō Rōshi was produced by Toei, and Shigeru Okada. It is based on the novel by Jiro Osaragi.

== Cast ==
Actor	Role
Chiezō Kataoka	Oishi (Ōishi Yoshio)
Kinnosuke Nakamura	Wakisaka
Chiyonosuke Azuma	Horibe
Hashizo Okawa	Lord Asano (daimyo Asano Naganori)
Satomi Oka	Sen
Ryosuke Kagawa	Matsumae Izunokami
Kusuo Abe	Katada
Kyōko Aoyama	Nagi
Shinobu Chihara	Ukibashi Dayu
Yoshiko Fujita	Ayame
Hiromi Hanazono	Sakura
Yumiko Hasegawa	Chiyo
Michiyo Kogure	Oyone
Jūshirō Konoe	Ikkaku Shimizu
Hiroki Matsukata	Oishi
Katsuo Nakamura	Denkichi
Keiko Okawa	Kita no kata
Denjirō Ōkōchi	Sakon Tachibana
Shunji Sakai	Matsuzo
Hiroko Sakuramachi	Osaki
Kōtarō Satomi	Uesugi
Shin Tokudaiji	Katada
Kenji Usuda	Yahei
Isao Yamagata	Kataoka
Eijirō Yanagi	Yanagisawa
Eitarō Shindō	Denpachiro
Ryūnosuke Tsukigata	Lord Kira
Ryūtarō Ōtomo	Hotta
Utaemon Ichikawa	Hizaka

== See also ==
- Forty-seven Ronin

Other films about Forty-seven ronin:

- The 47 Ronin (元禄忠臣蔵, Genroku chushingura) – 1941 film by Kenji Mizoguchi
- Akō Rōshi: Ten no Maki, Chi no Maki (赤穂浪士 天の巻 地の巻) – 1956 film by Sadatsugu Matsuda
- The Loyal 47 Ronin (忠臣蔵 Chushingura) – 1958 film by Kunio Watanabe, Daiei
- Chushingura: Hana no Maki, Yuki no Maki – 1962 film by Hiroshi Inagaki, Toho
- Nagadosu chūshingura, 1962 film by Kunio Watanabe
- Daichūshingura (大忠臣蔵, Daichūshingura) – 1971 television dramatization
- The Fall of Ako Castle (赤穂城断絶, Akō-jō danzetsu) (aka Swords Of Vengeance) – 1978 film by Kinji Fukasaku
- Akō Rōshi – 1979 television dramatization
