= Kodō Nomura =

- 野村胡堂
- Born: 15 October 1882; Iwate prefecture Japan
- Died: 14 April 1963 (aged 80); Tokyo Japan
- Occupation: Writer
- Writing career
- Genres: Historical fiction, music criticism

Osakazu Nomura (野村 長一, Nomura Osakazu; 15 October 1882 - 14 April 1963), known by his pen name Kodō Nomura (野村 胡堂, Nomura Kodō), was a Japanese novelist and music critic during the Shōwa era. He also used the pen name Araebisu for his music criticism. He is known for his creation of the fictional detective Zenigata Heiji.

== Early life ==
Nomura was born in the rural district of Shiwa county, Iwate prefecture in northern Japan, the younger son of a farmer. As a youth, he loved to read, and one of his favorite works was the Chinese classic Outlaws of the Marsh. He was sent to boarding school in Morioka, where he met Kindaichi Kyosuke, later a noted linguist and Namura's lifelong friend. One year behind him in the same school was future poet Ishikawa Takuboku. He attended Tokyo Imperial University, but left to work as a journalist for the Hochi Shimbun, a newspaper based in Tokyo. He continued to work as a journalist for the paper until it merged with the Yomiuri Shimbun in 1942.

== Literary career ==
While working as a journalist, Nomura began to write popular fiction, notably historical novels, which appeared in serialized form in the literary journal Bungei Shunju. His most famous work was a series of detective stories set in the Edo period called Zenigata Heiji torimono hikae ("The Casebook of Detective Zenigata Heiji", 1931–1958). The first episode appeared in Bungei Shunju in 1931, and (with a hiatus during World War II, the story continued for 383 episodes over the next 26 years. The main characters in the story were modeled after Sir Arthur Conan Doyle's famous detective pair, Sherlock Holmes and Dr Watson. The popularity of the story led to a movie adaptation in the year the novel was first published. Between 1931 and 1967, a total of 30 movies and an extremely long-running and popular television series (1966–84), were made. The story won the Kikuchi Kan Prize in 1958.

Nomura wrote other novels, including another detective series, Ikeda Daisuke torimono hikae ("The Casebook of Ikeda Daisuke"), but none were as popular as Zenigata Heiji.

Nomura died of acute pneumonia in 1963. His personal fortune (over 100 million yen) was set into a scholarship fund for aspiring writers. He had previously (in 1956) donated his entire library to his home town of Shiwa in Iwate prefecture, where it now resides in a memorial museum erected in his honor.

Nomura's daughter was the novelist Matsuda Keiko (1916–1940).

== References and further reading ==
- Fujikura Shiro. Zenigata Heiji no kokoro: Nomura Kodō araebisuden. Bungei Shuju (1995). ISBN 4-16-350650-0 (Japanese)
- Hirayama, Yuichi. ed. Japan and Sherlock Holmes. Baker Street Productions (2005). ISBN 0-9648788-7-9

== See also ==
- Japanese literature
- List of Japanese authors
