= Sanada Yukimura no Bōryaku =

- Film poster
- Directed by: Sadao Nakajima
- Screenplay by: Kazuo Kasahara; Sadao Nakajima
- Starring: Hiroki Matsukata; Teruhiko Aoi; Kensaku Morita; Yoko Akino; Fujita Okamoto; Shōhei Hino; Tatsuo Umemiya; Mieko Takamine; Tatsuo Umemiya; Tetsuro Tamba; Chiezō Kataoka; Yorozuya Kinnosuke
- Cinematography: Shigeru Akatsuka
- Edited by: Isamu Ichida
- Music by: Masaru Sato
- Distributed by: Toei Company
- Release date: September 1, 1979 (Japan)
- Running time: 148 minutes
- Country: Japan
- Language: Japanese

Sanada Yukimura no Bōryaku (Japanese: 真田幸村の謀略), also known as The Shogun Assassins, Death of the Shogun or Renegade Ninjas, is a 1979 Japanese film directed by Sadao Nakajima. The film deals with Sanada Yukimura and the Siege of Osaka.

== Cast ==
- Hiroki Matsukata as Sanada Yukimura
- Chiezō Kataoka as Sanada Masayuki
- Tatsuo Umemiya as Sanada Nobuyuki
- Teruhiko Aoi as Sarutobi Sasuke
- Guts Ishimatsu as Unno Rokurō
- Minori Terada as Kirigakure Saizō
- Kensaku Morita as Kakei Juzō
- Shōhei Hino as Anayama Kosuke
- Hiroyuki Sanada as Miyoshi Isa
- Nobuo Kaneko as Hayashi Razan
- Akiji Kobayashi as Honda Masazumi
- Seizō Fukumoto as Hayakaze
- Junichi Haruta as Akagumo
- Ryosuke Kagawa as Tenkai
- Rokkō Toura as Ono Harunaga
- Ichiro Ogura as Toyotomi Hideyori
- Mieko Takamine as Lady Yodo
- Mikio Narita as Katō Kiyomasa
- Tetsuro Tamba as Goto Matabei
- Kinnosuke Yorozuya (Special appearance) as Tokugawa Ieyasu
