= List of Lone Wolf and Cub episodes =

This is an episode list for the Japanese jidaigeki television series Lone Wolf and Cub.

== Series 1973–1976 ==
=== Season 1 ===
Season one ran from April 1 to September 30, 1973.

1. My Son and My Sword for Hire
2. Oyuki of the Gomune (Note: This episode has subsequently been removed from all TV broadcasts and DVD releases)
3. Fangs of the Wolf
4. Ikkoku-Bashi Bridge
5. Highway of Assassins
6. The Lowly Maid
7. Amya and Anema
8. The Guns of Sakai
9. The Castle Wall Attack
10. Six Roads to Infinity
11. Baby Cart on the River Styx
12. Deer Hunters
13. O-Chiyo's Boat
14. Article 79 (aka No Betrayal)
15. North to South, East to West
16. Night of Fangs
17. Cloud Tiger, Wind Dragon
18. Executioner Asaemon
19. Half Mat, One Mat, Two And A Half Go Of Rice
20. The 8 Gate Attack Formation
21. Chrysanthemum Inn
22. The Crossing Guard
23. The Tragedy Of Beku No Ji
24. Thread of Tears
25. The Yagyu Letter
26. Daigoro's Song
27. Drifting Shadows

=== Season 2 ===
Season two ran from April 7 to September 29, 1974.

1. Blackfaces of Death
2. Dark Southern Winds
3. Yagyu Five-Prong Attack
4. The Late Autumn Rain
5. Mid Winter Arrival
6. The Decoy
7. The Wolf Cometh
8. Japanese Silver Leaf
9. Women's Castle
10. Exorcism Day
11. Whistle of the Winter Wind
12. The Bell Ringer
13. The Red Cat Beckons
14. Footman's Demise
15. Destroy Hot Stones
16. Seven-Ri Runner
17. Memasho The Cop
18. Floating Lanterns
19. Beginning of Winter
20. The Female Inspector
21. Resolute Women
22. Suio Style Zanbato Blade
23. The Living Dead
24. An Ill Star
25. Thirteen Strings
26. Sayaka

=== Season 3 ===
Season three ran from April 4 to September 26, 1976.

1. Seeking Immortality
2. Wet Nurse's Parasol
3. No Tomorrow
4. The Silk Cloud
5. A Mother's Taste
6. Your Life is Mine
7. Five Sisters of Death
8. Season of Death
9. Unfortunate Pair
10. Ominous Path
11. The Flower of Happiness
12. The Hand Cannon
13. The Moon of Desire
14. Omens Good and Bad
15. Abe the Monster
16. Wildfire
17. The Scent
18. The Roaring Thunder
19. Light on the River of Blood
20. The Showdown
21. Impending Death
22. Fathers and Sons
23. Attack in the Shadows
24. The Guardian
25. Waves and Flutes
26. Swordsmanship
