= Zenigata Heiji =

- Zenigata Heiji character
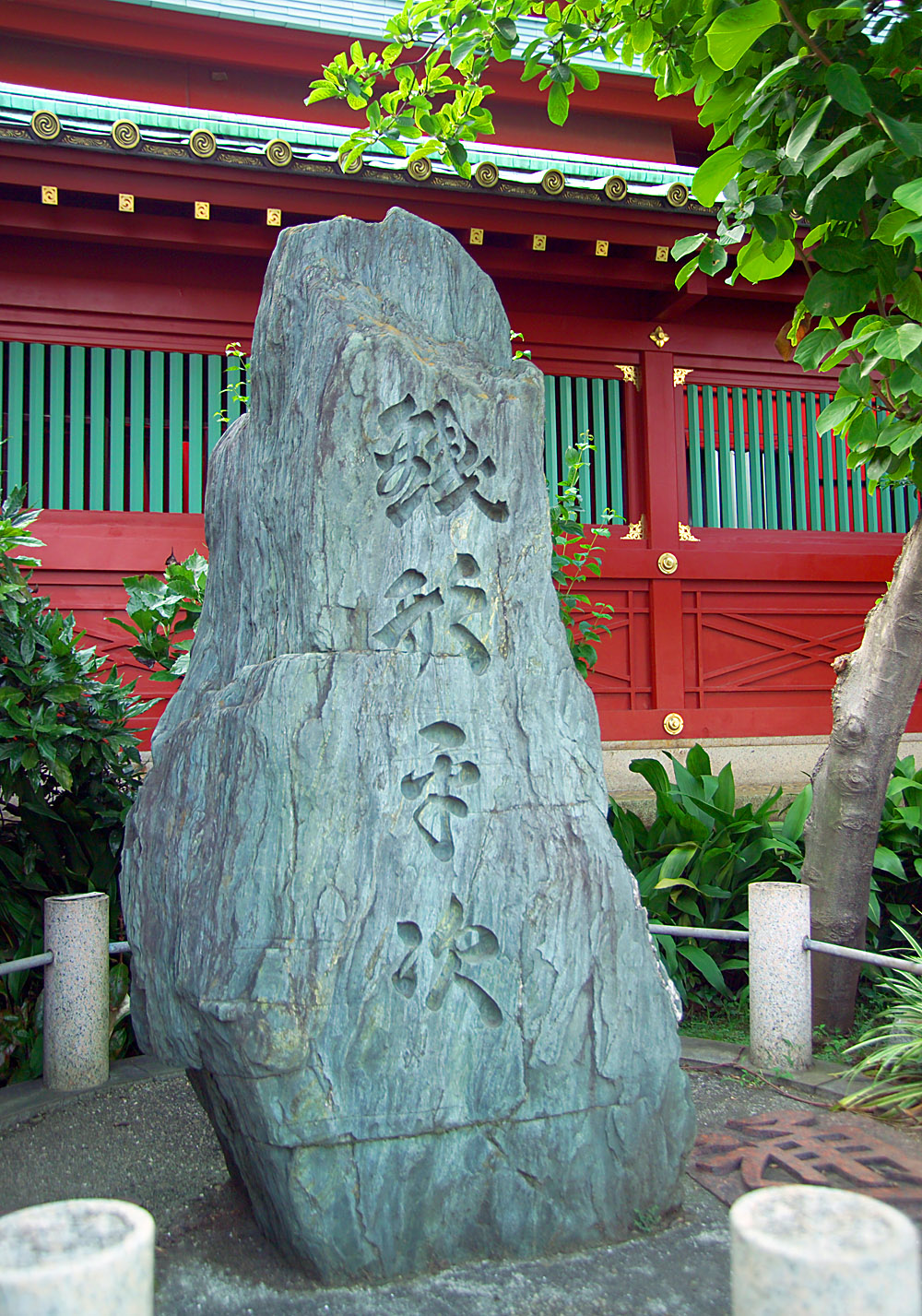
- Monument to Zenigata Heiji, Kanda Myojin Shrine. The monument stands atop a replica of Heiji's coin.
- First appearance: 1931
- Created by: Kodō Nomura

In-universe information
- Gender: Male
- Occupation: Consulting detective
- Nationality: Japanese

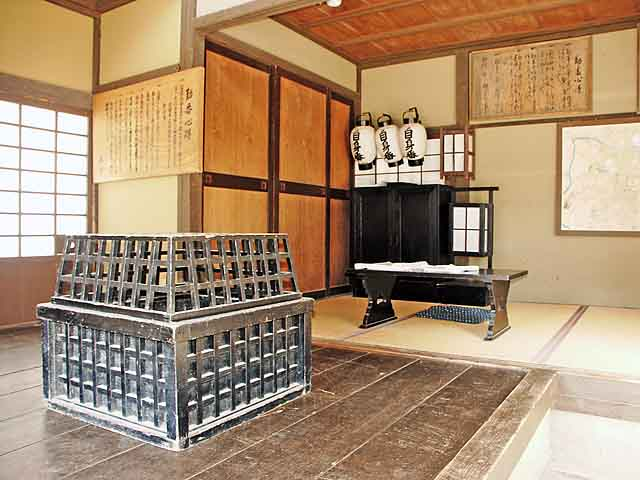
Police station (set of Zenigata Heiji, Toei Uzumasa Studios, Kyoto).

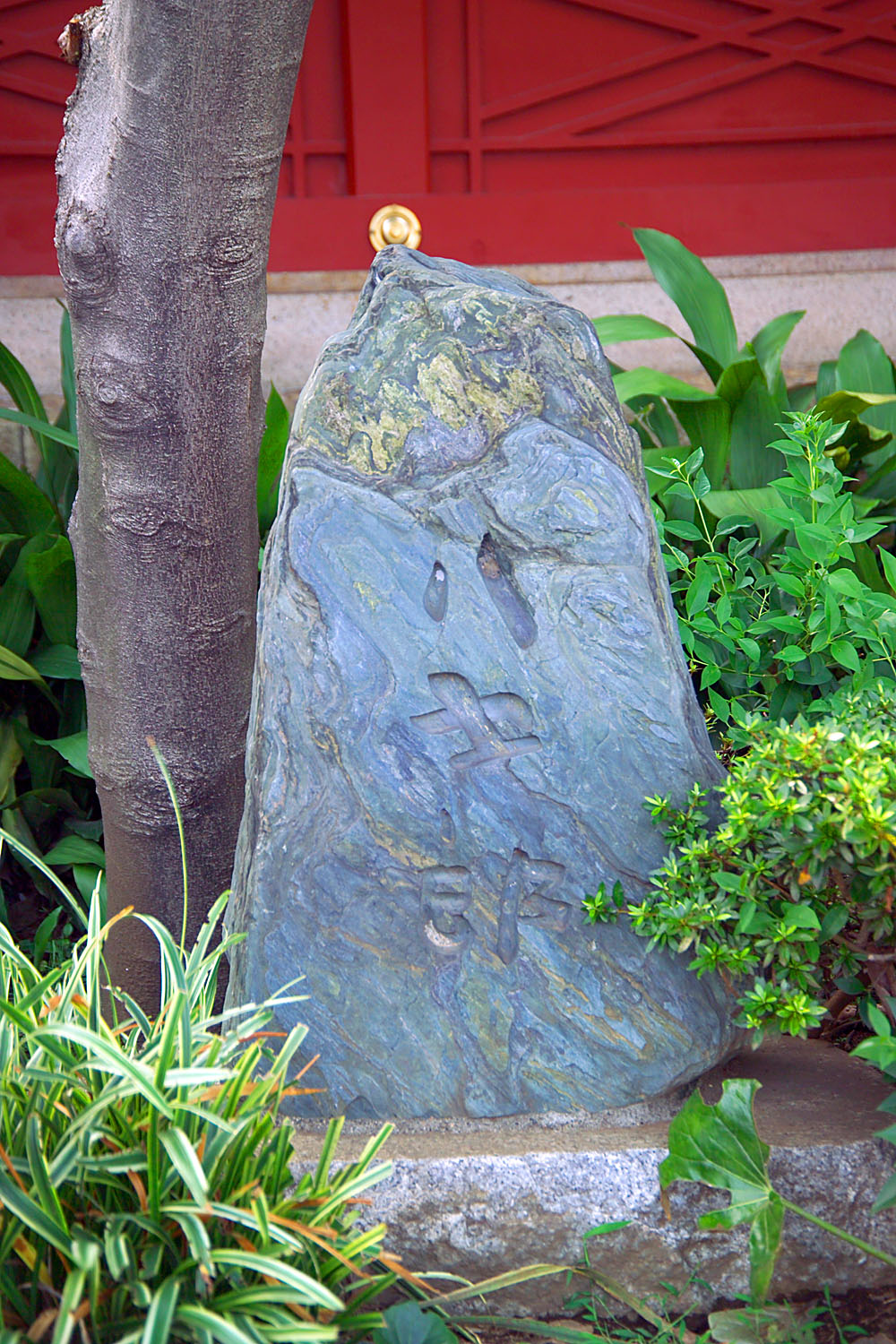
Monument to Hachigorō, Kanda Myōjin.

Zenigata Heiji (銭形 平次, Zenigata Heiji) is a Japanese fictional character, the hero of a series of Japanese novels, films and TV programmes set in the Edo period (1603–1868) of Japanese history. He is a policeman (岡っ引き, okappiki) who catches criminals by throwing coins, the zeni of the title, thus Zenigata Heiji. The hero was created by novelist Kodō Nomura (野村胡堂, Nomura Kodō) in 1931. Heiji's beat is Myōjin-shita, "beneath the (Kanda) Myōjin shrine".

== Situation ==
The hero, Heiji, lives with his wife Oshizu. His sidekick is Hachigorō (八五郎), also known as Karappachi or just Hachi. He uses deduction, a jitte, and old-fashioned coins with a hole, called kan'eitsūhō (寛永通宝), as weapons to catch criminals. It's implied that "Zenigata" isn't his surname, but a nickname given to him.

== Novels ==
The original series of stories ran from 1937 to 1959. The first story was published in the Japanese magazine Bungei Shunjū Ōru Yomimono-han (all story edition). In all, 383 stories were produced. Many are still in print in Japan today.

== Films ==
Films about Zenigata Heiji include:

- 銭形平次捕物控 振袖源太 (1931)
- 七人の花嫁
- 銭形平次捕物控 富籖政談 (1933)
- 銭形平次捕物控 復讐鬼 (1933)
- 銭形平次捕物控 紅蓮地獄 (1934)
- 銭形平次捕物控 濡れた千両箱 (1935)
- 銭形平次捕物控 (1939)
- 銭形平次捕物控第二話 名月神田祭 (1939)
- 銭形平次捕物控 平次の女難 (1939)
- 銭形平次捕物控 南蛮秘法箋 (1940)
- Zenigata Heiji Torimono-Hikae: Heiji Happyakuyacho (銭形平次捕物控 平次八百八町) (1949)
- Zenigata Heiji (銭形平次) (1951)
- Zenigata Heiji Torimono-Hikae: Koibumi Dochu (銭形平次捕物控 恋文道中) (1951)
- Zenigata Heiji Torimono-Hikae: Jigoku no Mon (銭形平次捕物控 地獄の門) (1952)
- Zenigata Heiji Torimono-Hikae: Karakuri Yashiki (銭形平次捕物控 からくり屋敷) (1953)
- (天晴れ一番手柄 青春銭形平次 ... Seishun Zenigata Heiji) (1953)
- Zenigata Heiji Torimono-Hikae: Kin'iro no ókami (銭形平次捕物控 金色の狼) (1953)
- Zenigata Heiji: Ghost Lord (銭形平次捕物控 幽霊大名, Zenigata Heiji Torimono-Hikae: Yūrei Daimyō) (1954)
- Zenigata Heiji Torimono-Hikae: Dokuro Kago (銭形平次捕物控 どくろ駕籠) (1955)
- Zenigata Heiji Torimono-Hikae: Shi Bijin Fuuro (銭形平次捕物控 死美人風呂) (1956)
- Zenigata Heiji: Human-skin Spider (銭形平次捕物控 人肌蜘蛛, Zenigata Heiji Torimono no Hikae: Hitohada Gumo) (1956)
- Zenigata Heiji Torimono-Hikae: Madara Hebi (銭形平次捕物控 まだら蛇) (1957)
- Zenigata Heiji Torimono-Hikae: Megitsune Yashiki (銭形平次捕物控 女狐屋敷) (1957)
- Zenigata Heiji Torimono-Hikae: Hachinin no Hanayome (銭形平次捕物控 八人の花嫁) (1958)
- Zenigata Heiji Torimono-Hikae: Onibi Tourou (銭形平次捕物控 鬼火燈籠) (1958)
- Zenigata Heiji Torimono-Hikae: Yuki-onna no Ashiato (銭形平次捕物控 雪女の足跡) (1958)
- Zenigata Heiji Torimono-Hikae: Bijin-gumo (銭形平次捕物控 美人蜘蛛) (1960)
- Zenigata Heiji Torimono-Hikae: Yoru no Emma Chou (銭形平次捕物控 夜のえんま帖) (1961)
- Zenigata Heiji Torimono-Hikae: Bijin Zame (銭形平次捕物控 美人鮫) (1961)
- 銭形平次捕物控 (1963)
- 銭形平次 (1967)

== TV series ==
The lyrics of the ending theme of the TV show changed every week depending on the plot line. In the TV series, the closing credits show a coin, based on the kan'eitsūhō coin thrown by Heiji, with Zenigata Heiji written on it.

TV series about Zenigata Heiji include:

- 銭形平次捕物控 Zenigata Heiji Torimono-Hikae (1958–1960) - 103 episodes
- 銭形平次捕物控 Zenigata Heiji Torimono-Hikae (1962–1963) - 48 episodes
- 銭形平次 Zenigata Heiji (Heiji, the Detective) (1966–1984) - 888 episodes. The longest-running Zenigata Heiji, Hashizo Okawa (大川橋蔵 Ōkawa Hashizō) made a total of 888 programmes, with several different co-stars, from 1966 until his death in 1984. Hashizō Ōgawa is recorded in the Guinness Book of Records as the longest-running actor in a one-hour long television series for his performance as Heiji. (Hashizō Ōawa was originally an onnagata, an actor who plays women's parts in kabuki.) Sanae Tsuchida was in the cast from 1970 to 1973.
- 銭形平次 Zenigata Heiji (1987) - 26 episodes
- 銭形平次 Zenigata Heiji (1991–1997) Kin'ya Kitaōji played Heiji in the 1990s, and in 2005, a new cast features Hiroaki Murakami in the lead role.
- 銭形平次 Zenigata Heiji (2004–2006)

== References/Appearances in other media ==
Zenigata Heiji, as he appeared in volume 8 of Detective Conan

- In the manga/anime Lupin III, one of the supporting characters is Inspector Koichi Zenigata, who continually chases the protagonist Lupin. It is stated in the first episode of the first season that he is a descendant of Zenigata Heiji. 'Detective Zenigata' in Japanese is pronounced 'Zenigata Keiji' giving the pun reference to Zenigata Heiji.
- Heiji appears in Monkey Punch's adaptation of the Time Agent stories.
- Zenigata Heiji is mentioned in the anime Ryusei no Rockman.
- In the Final Fantasy series, the Zeninage skill (alternately translated as MoneyThrow, GP Toss, or Takeover) consists of throwing coins at the target for damage. The skill was introduced in Final Fantasy V as a technique of the Samurai job. Final Fantasy VI requires that the "Heiji's Jitte" item be equipped to unlock this ability.
- In the video game Sekiro the main character can throw coins at his enemies. Since the game is about Samurai, this is probably both a reference to Zenigata Heiji.
- Zenigata Heiji is highlighted in volume 8 of the Detective Conan manga's edition of "Gosho Aoyama's Mystery Library", a section of the graphic novels where the author introduces a different detective (or occasionally, a villain) from mystery literature, television, or other media. Heiji is also the given name of one of the series' major characters, Heiji Hattori.
- In Ken Akamatsu's manga Mahou Sensei Negima, Zenigata Heiji is referenced during the fight between Mana Tatsumiya and Ku Fei, when the former uses coins to attack the latter.
- In a chapter of Urusei Yatsura, Ataru comes to believe that he is Heiji Zenigata upon picking up a jitte.
- In The Legend of Heroes: Trails through Daybreak and its sequels, the main character Van Arkride is a freelancer who often does detective work. One of his main abilities in combat involves throwing coins.

== See also ==
- Jidaigeki, Japanese period dramas
