= The Crucified Lovers =

1954 Japanese film

- Film poster
- Directed by: Kenji Mizoguchi
- Written by: Yoshikata Yoda; Matsutarō Kawaguchi
- Based on: Daikyōji mukashi goyomi; by Monzaemon Chikamatsu
- Produced by: Masaichi Nagata
- Starring: Kazuo Hasegawa; Kyōko Kagawa; Yōko Minamida; Eitarō Shindō
- Cinematography: Kazuo Miyagawa
- Edited by: Kanji Sugawara
- Music by: Fumio Hayasaka; Tamezō Mochizuki
- Production company: Daiei Film
- Distributed by: Daiei Film
- Release date: 23 November 1954 (Japan)
- Running time: 102 minutes
- Country: Japan
- Language: Japanese

The Crucified Lovers (Japanese: 近松物語, Hepburn: Chikamatsu Monogatari), also titled A Story from Chikamatsu, is a 1954 Japanese drama film directed by Kenji Mizoguchi. It was adapted from Monzaemon Chikamatsu's 1715 bunraku play Daikyōji mukashi goyomi.

== Plot ==
In Edo-period Japan, Mohei is an apprentice to Ishun, the wealthy grand scroll-maker of Kyoto. Mohei loyally serves his boss and works long hours for him. He has traditional views of morality and supports a sentence of crucifixion for an adulterous couple, even after he is reminded of Japan's double standard for wealthy men who cheat on their wives.

Ishun's tightfistedness and immorality force Mohei to rethink his simplistic, duty-bound worldview. When Ishun pressures his maid Otama to sleep with him, she lies that she and Mohei are engaged. Mohei refuses to go along with the ruse, arguing that an employee's duty is to serve their employer, even if it means being raped. However, neither does he expose Otama's deception. In addition, Ishun's wife Osan ropes Mohei into her family's financial difficulties. Ishun refuses to bail out Osan's family business, so Osan (whose mother forced her to marry Ishun for his money) begs Mohei to steal money from Ishun. Mohei is secretly in love with Osan and agrees to forge a money order for her.

Osan's plan fails when Mohei refuses to bribe a coworker who catches him; the coworker promptly turns him in to Ishun. Osan is about to confess, but Otama suddenly claims responsibility, hoping that her lie will protect Mohei. This backfires, as Ishun still thinks Otama is engaged to Mohei and decides to sideline his romantic rival. He puts Mohei under house arrest.

In the evening, Otama informs Osan that Ishun is cheating on her. The women devise a plan to have Osan catch her husband in the act by switching rooms for the night. However, Mohei accidentally derails the plan by escaping to meet Otama (whose room is occupied by Osan). While Mohei and Osan argue about whether Mohei should flee, Ishun's aide Sukeyemon catches them together and infers adultery. After returning from a night of carousing with geisha, Ishun hypocritically accuses his wife of adultery and directs her to commit suicide to protect the family name. However, while Ishun is distracted, Osan flees and links up with Mohei. Otama is allowed to quit her job.

The fugitives discover that Ishun has alerted the police to Mohei's forgery, but not his wife's purported adultery. Under shogunate law, failing to report a crime is itself a crime. However, Ishun does not want to admit his wife left him, which would scandalize his wealthy clients. Ishun's business rival Isan learns of the cover-up and conspires with Sukeyemon to reveal it at the right time so that he can destroy Ishun's company.

Osan and Mohei decide to commit suicide together. They change their minds when Mohei professes his love for Osan, and fake their deaths in Lake Biwa. After finding refuge in the mountains, Mohei tries to run away, reasoning that if he is gone, Ishun will take Osan back. However, Osan catches him and pledges her loyalty to him.

Ishun soon learns Osan and Mohei are alive. He uses his financial power and threats of collective punishment to turn Osan and Mohei's families against them. Mohei's father, who rents land from Ishun, betrays his own son and helps Ishun's henchmen kidnap Osan. When Osan refuses to see Ishun and returns to her family home, Ishun pays Osan's family to shame her into coming back. Mohei's father allows Mohei to flee to Osan's family home, but Osan's mother urges him to leave. When he declines, she tries to betray him to Ishun's henchmen, but the lovers run away together. At this point, Isan tips off the police about Ishun's failure to report his wife's adultery.

The police apprehend Mohei and Osan, but they also banish Ishun and Sukeyemon and strip them of their wealth. Before crucifying the lovers, the police parade Mohei and Osan through the streets of Kyoto. Their coworker remarks that she has never seen Osan so happy.

== Cast ==
- Kazuo Hasegawa as Mohei
- Kyōko Kagawa as Osan
- Eitarō Shindō as Ishun
- Eitarō Ozawa as Sukeyemon
- Yōko Minamida as Otama
- Haruo Tanaka as Gifuya Dōki
- Chieko Naniwa as Okō
- Ichirō Sugai as Genbei
- Tatsuya Ishiguro as Isan
- Hiroshi Mizuno as Kuroki
- Hisao Tōake as Morinokoji
- Ikkei Tamaki as Jūshirō Umegaki
- Kimiko Tachibana as Umetatsu Akamatsu
- Keiko Koyanagi as Okaya
- Sayako Nakagami as Osono

== Release ==
The Crucified Lovers was shown in competition at the 1955 Cannes Film Festival.

== Reception ==
On the review aggregator website Rotten Tomatoes, the film holds an approval rating of 100%, based on 7 reviews.

== Awards ==
- 1954 Blue Ribbon Award for Best Director Kenji Mizoguchi

== Legacy ==
The Crucified Lovers was included in the 1999 "critics top 200" list of the best Japanese films of all time conducted by film magazine Kinema Junpo.

In 2017, a 4K digitally restored version of the film was presented at the Venice Film Festival and the Kyoto Historica International Film Festival. The restored version was also presented at the Film Forum, New York, in 2018 and at the Berkeley Art Museum and Pacific Film Archive in 2021 as part of their retrospectives on cinematographer Kazuo Miyagawa.
