= Chiyonosuke Azuma =

Japanese actor and dancer (1926–2000)

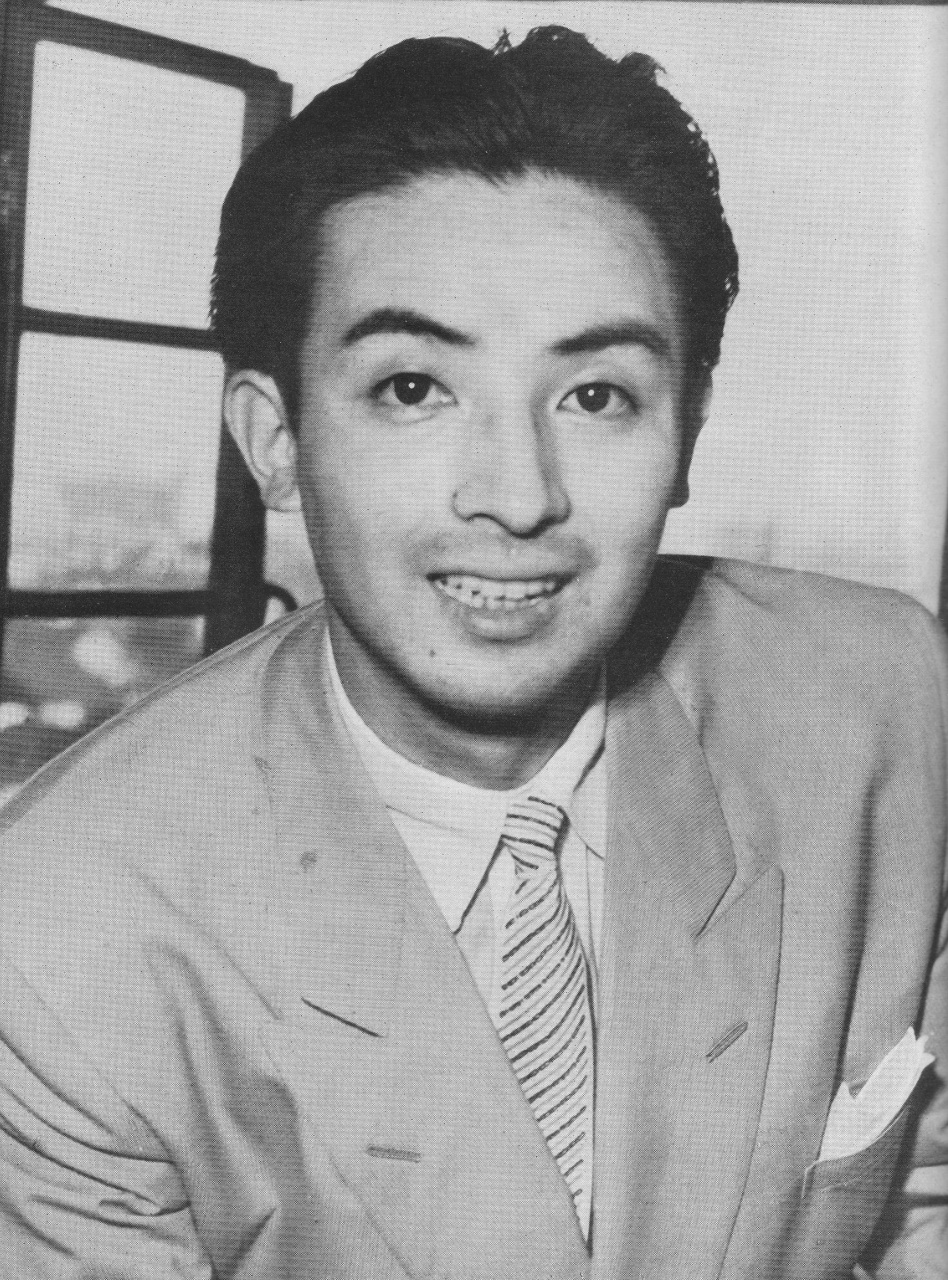
- Azuma in 1955
- Born: Takayuki Wakawada; 19 August 1926; Shinjuku-ku, Tokyo, Japan
- Died: 9 November 2000 (aged 74); Tokyo, Japan
- Occupations: Actor, dancer
- Years active: 1954–1993

Chiyonosuke Azuma (東 千代之介, Azuma Chiyonosuke; 19 August 1926 – 9 November 2000) was a Japanese actor and Nihon-buyō dancer. He appeared in more than 40 films from 1954 to 1993.

== Biography ==
Azuma was born on 19 August 1926, in Shinjuku, Tokyo. He attended the Tokyo University of the Arts, while studying Japanese dance under Bandō Mitsugorō VIII.

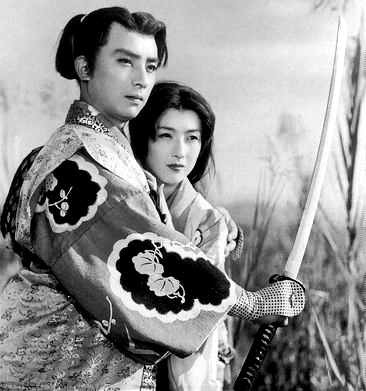
Chiyonosuke Azuma and Shinobu Chihara in Satomi Hakken-den (1954)

He joined the Toei studio in 1954 and became a star after his debut film, Yukinojo henge, was a hit. His films with Yorozuya Kinnosuke, such as the "Fuefuki Dōji" and "Beni Kujaku" series, were some of the more popular works during the golden age of jidaigeki in the 1950s.

After leaving Toei in 1965, Azuma concentrated on teaching dance while occasionally appearing in film and on stage and television.

Azuma died on 9 November 2000, in Tokyo, at the age of 74.

== Selected filmography ==
- Shinsengumi Oni Taicho (1954)
- Yukinojō henge - Fukushū no koi (1954) - Yukinojō Nakamura / Yamitarō
- Yukinojō henge - Fukushū no mai (1954) - Yukinojō Nakamura / Yamitarō
- Yukinojō henge - Fukushū no ken (1954) - Yukinojō Nakamura / Yamitarō
- Shinshokoku monogatari: Fuefuki douji dai-ichi-bu dokuro no hata
- Shinshokoku monogatari: Fuefuki douji dai-san-bu mangetsu-jō no gaika
- Satomi Hakken-den: Dai-ichi-bu yōtō murasame maru (1954)
- Satomi Hakken-den: Dai-ni-bu Hōryūkaku no ryūko (1954)
- Satomi Hakken-den: Dai-san-bu kaibyō ranbu (1954)
- Satomi Hakken-den: Dai-yon-bu ketsumei hakkenshi (1954)
- Satomi Hakken-den: Kanketsu-hen akatsuki no kachidoki (1954)
- Shinshokoku monogatari benikujaku 2: Noroi no mateki (1955)
- Shinshokoku monogatari benikujaku 3: Tsuki no hakkotsu shiro (1955)
- Ōedo senryō bayashi (1955)
- Shinshokoku monogatari benikujaku 4: Kenmō ukinemaru (1955)
- Shinshokoku monogatari benikujaku kanketsu-hen: Haikyo no hihō (1955)
- Kaidan botan-dōrō (1955)
- Yumiharizuki (1955)
- Bijo to kairyu (1955)
- Akō Rōshi: Ten no Maki, Chi no Maki (1956) - Takuminokami Asano
- Kengō nitōryū (1956) - Sasaki Kojiro
- Yūhi to kenjū (1956) - Rin'nosuke Date
- Shinshokoku monogatari: Nanatsu no chikai kurosuisen no maki (1956)
- Shinshokoku monogatari: Nanatsu no chikai doreisen no maki (1957)
- Shinshokoku monogatari: Nanatsu no chikai gaisen uta no maki (1957)
- Sasaki Kojiro (1957) - Sasaki Kojiro
- Kaidan Banchō sara-yashiki (1957)
- Mito kōmon (1957)
- Sasaki Kojiro Kohen (1957) - Sasaki Kojiro
- Ninkyō Shimizu-minato (1957) - Shichigoro
- Junjō butai (1957)
- Onmitsu Shichishoki (1958)
- Ninkyo Tokaido (1958) - Hangoro
- Hibari torimonocho: Kanzashi koban (1958) - Sasaki
- Ninjutsu suikoden inazuma kotengu (1958)
- Daibosatsu tōge - Dai ni bu (1958)
- Ōedo shichininshū (1958)
- Utamatsuri kanzashi matoi (1958)
- Daibosatsu tōge - Kanketsu-hen (1959)
- Hibari torimonochō: furisode koban (1959)
- Tatsumaki bugyō (1959)
- Kurama Tengu (1959)
- Futari wakagishi (1959)
- Beni-dasuki kenkajo (1959)
- Mito Komon 3: All Star Version (1960)
- Tenpō rokkasen - Jigoku no hanamichi (1960) - Ichinojō Kaneko
- Hibari torimonochō: orizuru kago (1960)
- Yatarō gasa (1960) - Magistrate Kuwayama
- Suronin hyakuman-goku (1960)
- Abare kago (1960)
- Akō Rōshi (1961) - Horibe
- Hangyakuji (1961)
- Yurei-jima no okite (1961)
- Wakasama yakuza (1961)
- Kisaragi musō ken (1962) - Yoshimune Tokugawa
- Chiisakobe (1962) - Washichi
- Yoi-dore musoken (1962)
- Hibari Chiemi no Yaji Kita Dochu (1963)
- Seventeen Ninja (1963) - Bunzo Minuma
- Kutsukake Tokijiro - yukyo ippiki (1966)
- Kindaichi Kosuke no boken (1979) - Kojuro Akechi
- Battle Fever J (1979-1980, TV Series) - General Tetsuzan Kurama
- Sanada Taiheiki (1985) - Yagyū Munetoshi
- Jipangu (1990) - Ieyasu Tokugawa
- Anego - Gokudō wo aishita onna: Kiriko (1993) - Wakasa (final film role)
