= Ryūnosuke Tsukigata =

Japanese actor (1902–1970)

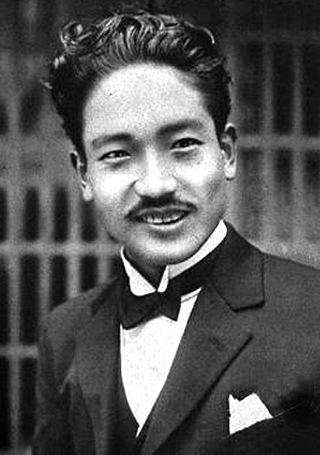
- Ryūnosuke Tsukigata
- Born: March 18, 1902; Miyagi Prefecture
- Died: August 30, 1970 (aged 68)
- Other names: Kiyoto Monden
- Occupation: actor

Ryūnosuke Tsukigata (月形龍之介, Tsukigata Ryūnosuke; 18 March 1902 – 30 August 1970) was a Japanese actor known especially for his work in jidaigeki in film and television. His real name was Kiyoto Monden.

== Career ==
Born in Miyagi Prefecture, Tsukigata entered the actor's school at Nikkatsu in 1920, but earned his first starring role working at Shōzō Makino's studio in 1924. He became a star of chanbara films, but got into trouble when he ran away with Makino's daughter, Teruko Makino, even though he was married. He eventually left Teruko and returned to the fold, but left again to start his own production company, which soon failed. Continuing to work at various studios, Tsukigata appeared in films by such masters as Daisuke Itō, Mansaku Itami, and Hiroshi Inagaki. He is probably best known to foreign audiences for playing Sanshiro's rival in Akira Kurosawa's Sanshiro Sugata. After World War II, he moved into supporting roles at the Tōei studio, but also played such major characters as Tokugawa Mitsukuni (Mito Kōmon) on film and television.

== Selected filmography ==
- Zanjin zanbaken (斬人斬馬剣) (1928)
- Chūji uridasu (忠治売出す) (1935)
- Muhōmatsu no isshō (無法松の一生) (1943)
- Sanshiro Sugata (1943)
- Noroshi wa Shanghai ni agaru (1944)
- Sanshiro Sugata Part II (1945)
- The Invisible Man Appears (1949)
- Kojiki Taishō (1952) as Kuroda Nagamasa
- Bloody Spear at Mount Fuji (1955)
- Dai-bosatsu tōge (1957)
- Kunisada Chūji (1958)
- Akō Rōshi (Akō Rōshi) (1961)
- Hangyakuji (1961) as Oda Nobunaga
- The Mad Fox (1962)
- 13 Assassins (1963) as Makino
- Soshiki Bōryoku (1967)
- Samurai Banners (1969) as Kasahara Kiyoshige
