= Eitarō Shindō =

Japanese actor (1899–1977)

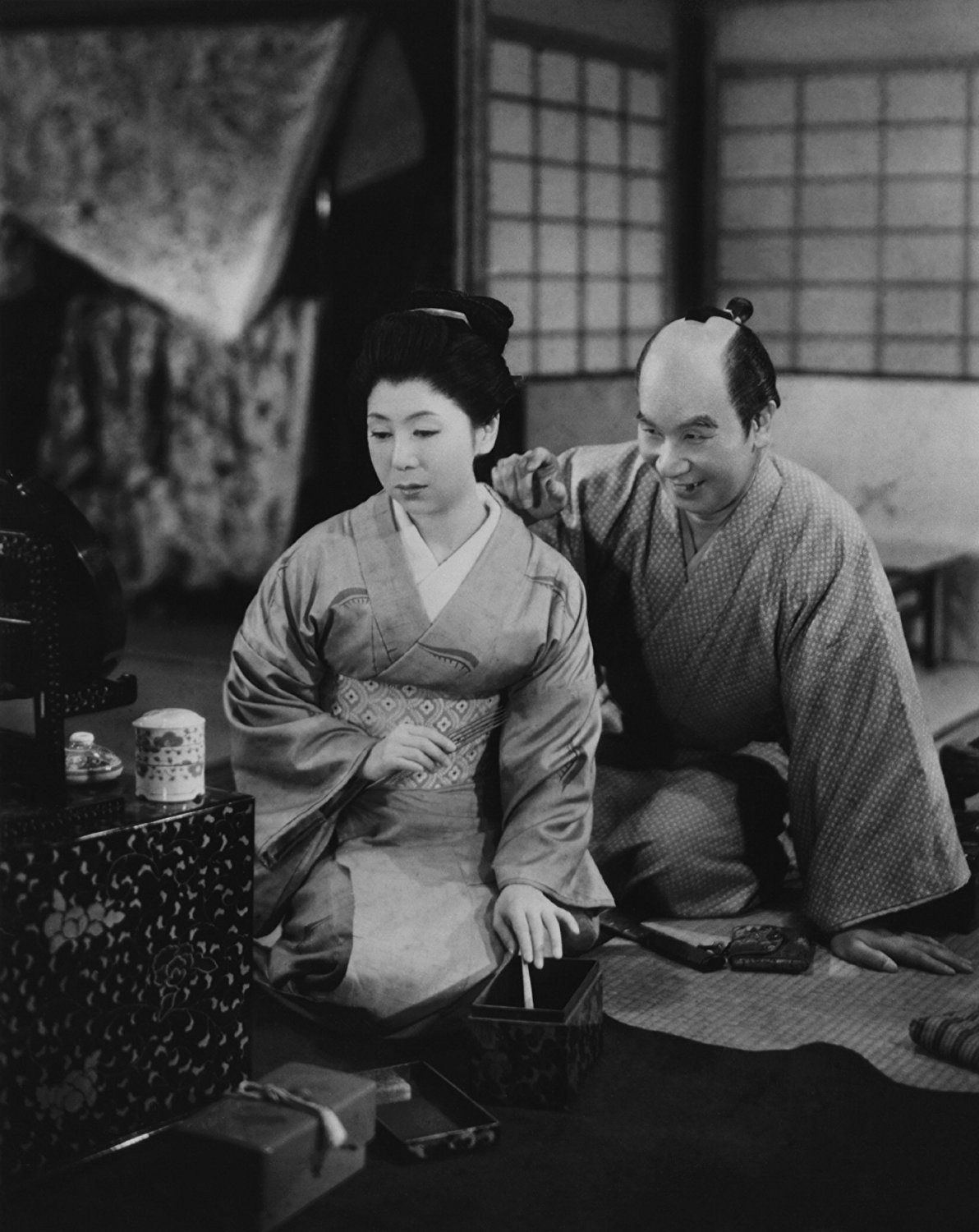
- Kinuyo Tanaka and Eitarō Shindō in The Life of Oharu (1952) directed by Kenji Mizoguchi
- Born: 10 November 1899; Fukuoka, Japan
- Died: 18 February 1977 (aged 77); Tokyo, Japan
- Occupation: Actor
- Years active: 1926–1976

Eitarō Shindō (進藤 英太郎, Shindō Eitarō; 10 November 1899 – 18 February 1977) was a Japanese film actor. He appeared in more than 300 films between 1936 and 1975. He is most closely associated with the work of Kenji Mizoguchi, with whom he made twelve films.

== Selected filmography ==
- Sisters of the Gion (1936)
- Aru yo no Tonosama (1946)
- Drunken Angel (1948)
- Conduct Report on Professor Ishinaka (1950)
- Battle of Roses (1950)
- Miss Oyu (1951)
- The Life of Oharu (1952)
- Life of a Woman (1953)
- A Geisha (1953)
- Sansho the Bailiff (1954)
- The Princess Sen (1954)
- The Crucified Lovers (1954)
- Bloody Spear at Mount Fuji (1955)
- Princess Yang Kwei-Fei (1955)
- Tōjūrō no Koi (1955)
- Shin Heike Monogatari (1955)
- Street of Shame (1956)
- Akō Rōshi (1961)
- Kenji Mizoguchi: The Life of a Film Director (1975)
