= Shōzō Makino (director) =

Japanese film director, film producer and businessman (1878–1929)

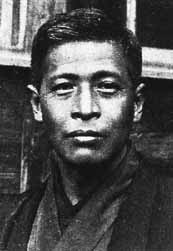
- Born: September 22, 1878; Kyoto, Japan
- Died: July 25, 1929 (aged 50)
- Occupations: Film director; film producer; businessman
- Children: 5, including Sadatsugu Matsuda and Masahiro Makino
- Relatives: Hiroyuki Nagato (grandson); Masahiko Tsugawa (grandson); Kunitaro Sawamura (son-in-law); Anna Makino (great-granddaughter)

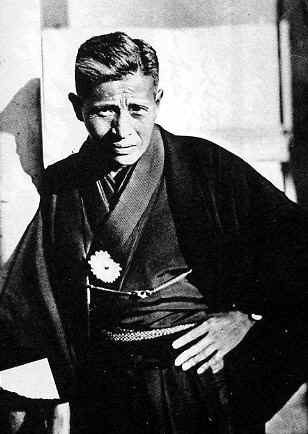
Shōzō Makino in 1920s

Shōzō Makino (牧野省三, Makino Shōzō, September 22, 1878, Kyoto – July 25, 1929) was a Japanese film director, film producer and businessman who is regarded as a pioneering director of Japanese film, granting the title "Father of the Japanese film" (Japanese: 日本映画の父, Hepburn: Nihon Eiga no Chichi) liken to D. W. Griffith, (Note: Not to confuse with Masaichi Nagata, who was known as the "Father of cinema" (Japanese: 映画界の父, Hepburn: Eigakai no Chichi) and entered the film industry due to his relationships with Shōzō and the Makino Family.) while Makino was proud of the nickname "Griffith Makino" (Japanese: グリフィス・マキノ, Hepburn: Grifisu Makino) given by Griffith himself.

In addition, all four of his sons, including Masahiro Makino and Sadatsugu Matsuda, went into the film business as either directors or producers, and his grandchildren include the actors Masahiko Tsugawa and Hiroyuki Nagato. Actress Yoko Minamida is a granddaughter-in-law.

== Career ==
Makino was born in Kyoto on September 22, 1878. His mother ran a theater, and his association with movies began when the motion picture producer Einosuke Yokota of Yokota Shōkai asked for his help in filming period films. Shozo discovered actor Matsunosuke Onoe working in an itinerant kabuki troupe and enlisted him into becoming Japan's first film star. He directed over 60 Matsunosuke films a year in the early 1910s, most if not all short films.

In addition to creating the unique genre of the Japanese period film, Makino also incorporated trick camera techniques and a myriad of other cinematic methods of expression into his films. In 1919, he founded the Mikado Company and began to produce educational films. He later founded an independent production company, Makino Film Productions, and from 1923, continued as a director and as producer. Makino Film Productions turned out many successful movies also made by several other directors and actors.

In 1928, he directed the epic, Jitsuroku Chushingura (True Record of the Forty-Seven Ronin), which coincided with his 50th birthday. He died on July 25, 1929.

== Family ==
He had a total of five children. Two of his sons, Sadatsugu Matsuda (1906–2003) and Masahiro Makino (1908–1993) were also film directors. Another, Mitsuo Makino, was a film producer, and another Shinzō Makino, also worked as a director (his wife was the actress Chikako Miyagi). Masahiro married the actress Yukiko Todoroki and their son, Masayuki Makino, is the head of the Okinawa Actor's School. Shōzō's daughter, Tomoko Makino, married the actor Kunitarō Sawamura, and is the mother to actors Masahiko Tsugawa and Hiroyuki Nagato, both of whom married famous actresses, Yukiji Asaoka and Yōko Minamida respectively. Kunitarō's brother and sister are the actors Daisuke Katō and Sadako Sawamura.

== Filmography ==
- 1914 Kōchiyama Sōshun
- 1921 Jiraiya the Hero (Gōketsu Jiraiya)
- 1928 Jitsuroku Chushingura (True Record of the Forty-Seven Ronin)
