= Makino Film Productions =

Japanese film studio

- Founded: 1923 in Japan
- Founder: Shozo Makino

Makino Film Productions was a successful early film producing company active in Japanese cinema in the 1920s and 1930s. It was founded by the pioneering film director Shozo Makino in 1923. Makino produced many prominent films of the early era, and employed many directors and actors within its production.

Makino separated from the Mikado Company he had founded in 1919 into an independent production company, Makino Film Productions, and from 1923 continued his work as a director and producer. In 1929, he started distributing talkies with a sound-on-disc system.

== External links and sources ==
- Shozo Makino at IMDb
