= Yorozuya Kinnosuke =

Kabuki actor (1932–1997)

Kinnosuke Yorozuya
- 萬屋錦之介
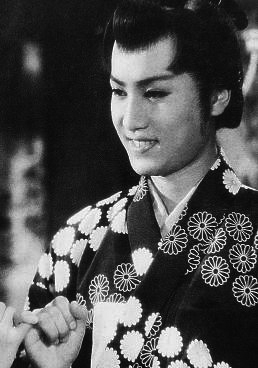
- Kinnosuke as Kikumaru in Fuefuki Dōji
- Born: Kin'ichi Ogawa (小川 錦一); November 20, 1932; Minato-ku, Tokyo, Japan
- Died: March 10, 1997 (aged 64); Kashiwa, Chiba, Japan
- Other name: Nakamura Kinnosuke
- Occupation: Kabuki actor
- Spouse(s): Ineko Arima (1961–1965); Keiko Awaji (1966–1987); Nishiki Kō (1990–1997)
- Father: Nakamura Tokizō III
- Relatives: Nakamura Karoku I (great-grandfather); Nakamura Karoku III (grandfather); Nakamura Tokizō IV (older brother); Nakamura Shidō I (older brother); Nakamura Kashō II (older brother); Nakamura Karoku V (nephew); Nakamura Matagorō III (nephew); Nakamura Tokizō V (nephew); Nakamura Kinnosuke II (nephew); Nakamura Shidō II (nephew)

Yorozuya Kinnosuke (萬屋錦之介) (November 20, 1932 – March 10, 1997) was a Japanese kabuki actor. Born Kin'ichi Ogawa (小川 錦一, Ogawa Kin'ichi), son of kabuki actor Nakamura Tokizō III, he entered kabuki and became the first in the kabuki tradition to take the name Nakamura Kinnosuke. He took on his guild name (yagō) Yorozuya as his surname in 1971.

In addition to his kabuki activity, Kinnosuke had an extensive film career. A specialist in jidaigeki, Kinnosuke appeared in more than 140 films. These include a 1957 Mito Kōmon and a 1961 appearance as the title character in the Toei Company's Miyamoto Musashi series (a role he reprised in 1962, 1963, 1964, and 1965, and again in 1971). A versatile actor, he has played as many as seven characters in a single film. In various productions of Chūshingura, he also portrayed Oyamada Shōzaemon (1956), Asano Naganori (1959), Wakisaka Awaji no Kami (1961), and Ōishi Yoshio (1978). Other appearances include Minamoto no Yoshitsune (1957, 1958, 1962), Tokugawa Iemitsu (1958), Oda Nobunaga (1965), Takeda Shingen (1969), Sakamoto Ryōma (1970), Matsudaira Katamori (1980), and Oda Yūrakusai (1989).

Kinnosuke portrayed Yagyū Munenori multiple times, first on television as the star of the year-long 1971 NHK Taiga drama Haru no Sakamichi, then on the Big Screen in the 1978 film Shogun's Samurai. His next appearance as Munenori was in a 13 episode TV production entitled Yagyū Shinkage-ryū which aired in 1982. His final appearance as Munenori was in 4 of 5 Yagyu Bugeicho TV movies that aired between 1990 and 1992. From 1973 to 1976, he played Ogami Ittō, the Lone Wolf in the NTV series Kozure Ōkami based on the manga Lone Wolf and Cub. A late-career role was Yamana Sōzen in the Taiga drama Hana no Ran.

Kinnosuke's younger brother Nakamura Katsuo and nephew Nakamura Shidō II are currently active in kabuki, television, and film.

== Personal life ==
He was first married to Arima Ineko between 1961 and 1965. During his marriage with Ineko he had a relationship with Kieko Awaji and, following his divorce from Ineko they were married in 1966, thus becoming stepfather to her sons from her first marriage. They had two sons together -- Akhiro and Yosuke -- before they divorced, after his affair with Nishiki Kō was exposed in 1990; he then married Kō. His third son, Ogawa Akihiro, died in a motorcycle accident in 1990. Despite quitting kabuki, he urged his nephew, Nakamura Shido II, in his career as a kabuki actor in 1989 , where he found success as a mainstream entertainer. He was good friends with Shintaro Katsu.

== Filmography ==
=== Film ===
Year	Title	Role	Notes
1954	Shinshokoku monogatari		Part 1 & 2
1954	Satomi Hakken-den		Part 1–5
1954	Mangetsu tanuki-bayashi	Mametaro / Gen'nosuke	
1954	Shinshokoku monogatari, benikujaku dai-ippen		
1954	Shinsengumi Oni Taicho		
1955	Seizoroi Kenka Wakashu	Benten Kozo Kikunosuke	
1955	Shinshokoku monogatari benikujaku		Part 2–4
1955	Sezuroi kenkawa kashu		
1955	Shinshokoku monogatari benikujaku kanketsu-hen		
1955	Seishun kôro: Umi no wakôdo	Eiichirô Yamazato	
1955	Beni kujaku		
1955	Minamoto Yoshitsune		
1956	Akô rôshi - Ten no maki; Chi no maki	Shôzaemon Oyamada	
1956	Kaidan Chidori ga fuchi	Minosuke	
1957	Shinshokoku monogatari		Part 1–3
1957	Daibosatsu tōge	Uzuki Hyoma	
1957	Mito kômon		
1957	Yurei-sen	Jirômaru	Part 1 & 2
1957	Ninkyō Shimizu-minato	Mori no Ishimatsu	
1957–1958	Genji Kurô Sassôki	Genji Kurô	Part 1 & 2
1958	Edo no meibutsuotoko	Isshin Tasuke	Part 1
1958	Kaze to onna to tabigarasu	Ginji	
1958	Daibosatsu tōge - Dai ni bu		
1958	Onmitsu Shichishoki		
1958	Isshin Tasuke - Tenka no ichidaiji	Isshin Tasuke / Tokugawa Iemitsu	
1958	Shimizu Minato no meibutso otoko: Enshūmori no Ishimatsu		
1958	Obuzo tengu		
1958	Ninkyo Tokaido	Onikichi	
1959	Ken wa shitte ita		
1959	Asama no abarenbo		
1959	Doku-ganryu Masamune	Date Masamune	
1959	Binan-jo		
1959	Daibosatsu tōge - Kanketsu-hen		
1959	Fuunji Oda Nobunaga		
1959	Tenka no fuku-shogun		
1959	Doto no taiketsu		
1960	Naniwa no koi no monogatari	Chubei Kameya	
1960	Isshin Tasuke		
1960	Torimono dochu		
1960	Abarenbo kyodai		
1960	Shinran	Shinran	
1960	Tôei All Star Eiga: Mito Kômon		
1960	Zoku shinran		
1960	Mori no Ishimatsu		
1960	Tokai no kaoyaku	Jirocho	
1961	Yatarō gasa	Yataro	
1961	Tonosama	Yaji kita	
1961	Iyemitsu to Hikoza to isshin yasuke		
1961	Eddoko bugyo tenka o kiru otoko		
1961	Akō Rōshi	Wakisaka	
1962	Miyamoto Musashi	Miyamoto Musashi (Takezo)	
1962	Hangyakuji	Tokugawa Nobuyasu	
1962	Eddoko hanseiki		
1962	Wakaki ni ho Jirocho: Tokaido no tsumujikaze		
1962	Mabuta no haha	Banba no Chutaro	
1962	Chiisakobe	Shigetsugu	
1962	Miyamoto Musashi: Hannyazaka no ketto	Miyamoto Musashi (Takezo)	
1963	Sen-hime to Hideyori	Toyotomi Hideyori	
1963	Jirochō to kotengu: nagurikomi kōshūji		
1963	Genji Kurō sassōki: Hiken ageha no chō		
1963	Otoko ippiki dochuki		
1964	Bushido, Samurai Saga	Jirozaemon / Iikura / Sajiemon / Kyutaro / Shuzo / Shingo / Osamu / Susumu	
1964	Miyamoto Musashi: Nitoryu kaigen	Miyamoto Musashi (Takezo)	
1964	Seki no yatappe		
1964	Fuji dōzan-koku monogatari		
1964	Brave Records of the Sanada Clan	Sasuke	
1964	Miyamoto Musashi: Ichijoji no ketto	Miyamoto Musashi (Takezo)	
1964	Samé	Same	
1965	Nihon kyôkaku-den	Seiji	
1965	Revenge	Shinpachi Ezaki	
1965	Shark		
1965	Tokugawa Ieyasu	Oda Nobunaga	
1965	Hiya-meshi to Osan to Chan	Daishiro Shibayama / Santa / Jyukichi	Anthologies film (episodes 1–3)
1965	Matatabi san ning yakuza	Kaze-no-Kyutaro	
1966	Miyamoto Musashi: Ganryū-jima no kettō	Miyamoto Musashi (Takezo)	
1966	Hana to ryu		
1966	Kutsukake Tokijiro	yukyo ippiki	
1967	Tange Sazen: Hien iaigiri	Samanosuke / Tange Sazen	
1967	Hana To Ryu: Do Kâiwan No Kêtto		
1968	Gion Matsuri	Shinkichi	
1969	Samurai Banners	Takeda Shingen	
1969	Goyokin	Samon Fujimaki	
1969	Shirikurae Magoichi	Magoichi Saika	
1969	Portrait of Hell	Lord Horikawa	
1970	Shinsengumi	Fujita Arima	
1970	Bakumatsu	Ryoma Sakamoto	
1970	Machibuse	Heima Ibuki	
1970	Tenka no Abarembō	Yataro Iwasaki	
1971	Shokon ichidai tenka no abarenbo		
1971	Shinken shobu	Musashi Miyamoto	
1972	Akatsuki no chôsen		
1978	Shogun's Samurai	Yagyū Munenori	
1978	Ogin-sama		
1978	The Fall of Ako Castle	Kuranosuke Ohishi	
1979	Nichiren	Nichiren	
1979	Sanada Yukimura no Bōryaku	Tokugawa Ieyasu	
1979	Renegade ninjas		
1980	Tokugawa ichizoku no houkai	Matsudaira Katamori	Lord of Aizu
1981	Shikake-nin Baian	Baian Fujieda	
1982	Seishun no mon: Jiritsu hen	Eiji Niki	
1983	Kita kara minami nishi kara higashi	Ittô Ogami	
1984	Tori ni tsubasa kemono ni kiba	Ittô Ogami	
1984	The Fugitive Samurai	Ittô Ogami	English compilation film of 1972 TV series
1985	Saigo no Bakuto	Harunobu Kiyoshima	
1985	Kozure Ôkami: osanago no me	Ittô Ogami	
1989	Death of a Tea Master	Urakusai Oda	
TBA	Minamoto Yoshitsune		
TBA	Jishi maru ippei		

=== Television ===
Year	Title	Role	Notes
1965	Hiya-meshi to Osanto-chan	Daishiro Shibayama / Santa / Jūkichi	Episodes 1–3
1971	Haru no Sakamichi	Yagyū Munenori	
1973–1976	Lone Wolf and Cub	Ittō Ogami	
1975	Nagasaki Hangachōu	Hiramatsu Chūshirō	
1978	The Yagyu Conspiracy	Tokugawa Yoshinao	
1979	Akō Rōshi	Ōishi Kuranosuke Yoshio / Yoshitaka	
1981	Sorekara no Musashi	Miyamoto Musashi	
1982	Yagyū Shinkage-ryū	Yagyū Munenori	
1986	Musashibō Benkei	Fujiwara no Hidehira	
1987	Tabaruzaka	Katsu Kaishū	
1990–1992	Yagyū Bugei-chō	Yagyū Munenori	
1994	Hana no Ran	Yamana Sōzen	
1996	Kanpanî	Himself	

== Producer ==
- Sorekara no Musashi (1981) TV series
- Bakumatsu (1970) (associate producer)

== Awards and nominations ==
- In 1958 he won for Best Actor in Isshin Tasuke - Tenka no ichidaiji by the Asia-Pacific Film Festival.
- In 1959 he won the Most Popular Award by the Blue Ribbon Awards.
- In 1964 he won for Best Actor in Bushidô zankoku monogatari by the Blue Ribbon Awards.
- In 1979 he was Nominated for the Award of the Japanese Academy for Best Actor in Yagyû ichizoku no inbô.
- In 1990 he was Nominated for the Award of the Japanese Academy for Best Supporting Actor in Sen no Rikyu.
- In 1996 he was awarded a Lifetime Achievement Award by the Awards of the Japanese Academy.
- In 1998 he was awarded a Special Award by the Awards of the Japanese Academy for his career.
- In 1998 he was awarded a Special Award by the Mainichi Film Concours for his career.
