= Jidaigeki =

Japanese media and theatre genre

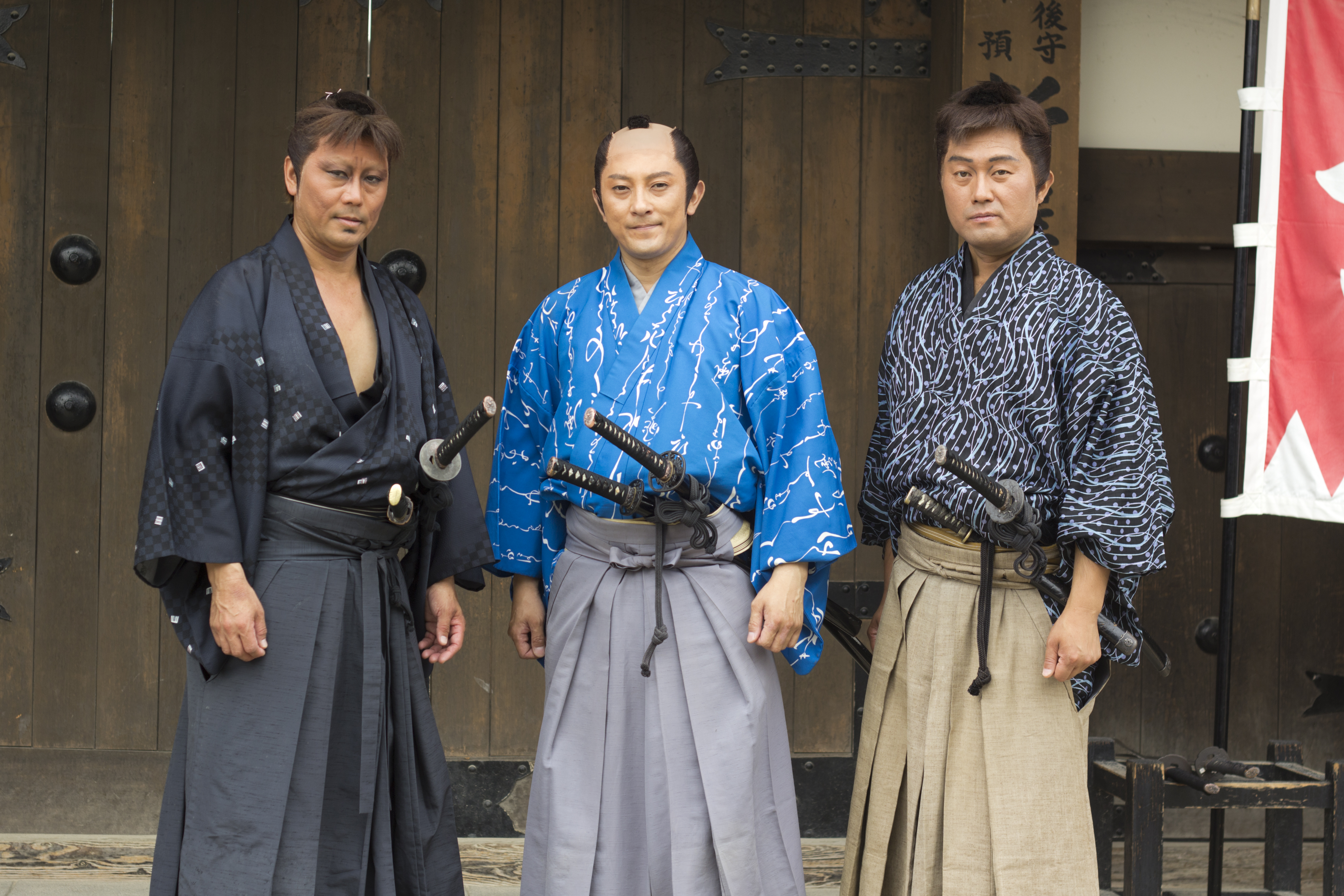
Actors playing samurai and ronin at Kyoto's Eigamura film studio

Jidaigeki (時代劇) is a genre of film, television, and theatre in Japan. Literally meaning "period dramas", it refers to stories that take place before the Meiji Restoration of 1868.

Jidaigeki show the lives of the samurai, farmers, craftsmen, and merchants of their time. Jidaigeki films are sometimes referred to as chambara movies, a word meaning "sword fight", though chambara is more accurately a subgenre of jidaigeki. Jidaigeki rely on an established set of dramatic conventions including the use of makeup, language, catchphrases, and plotlines.

== Types ==
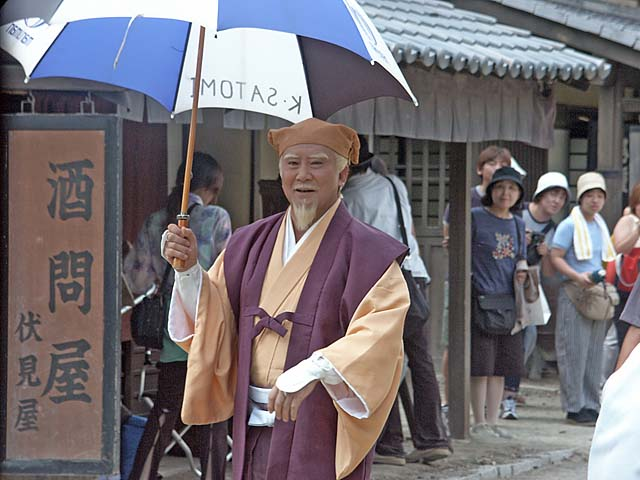
Actor Kotaro Satomi on the set of Mito Kōmon

Many jidaigeki take place in Edo, the military capital. Others show the adventures of people wandering from place to place. The long-running television series Zenigata Heiji and Abarenbō Shōgun typify the Edo jidaigeki. Mito Kōmon, the fictitious story of the travels of the historical daimyō Tokugawa Mitsukuni, and the Zatoichi movies and television series, exemplify the traveling style.

Another way to categorize jidaigeki is according to the social status of the principal characters. The title character of Abarenbō Shōgun is Tokugawa Yoshimune, the eighth Tokugawa shōgun. The head of the samurai class, Yoshimune assumes the disguise of a low-ranking hatamoto, a samurai in the service of the shogun. Similarly, Mito Kōmon is the retired vice-shogun, masquerading as a merchant.

In contrast, the coin-throwing Heiji of Zenigata Heiji is a commoner, working for the police, while Ichi (the title character of Zatoichi), a blind masseur, is an outcast, as were many disabled people in that era. In fact, masseurs, who typically were at the bottom of the professional food chain, was one of the few vocational positions available to the blind in that era. Gokenin Zankurō is a samurai but, due to his low rank and income, he has to work extra jobs that higher-ranking samurai were unaccustomed to doing.

Whether the lead role is samurai or commoner, jidaigeki usually reach a climax in an immense sword fight just before the end. The title character of a series always wins, whether using a sword or a jitte (the device police used to trap, and sometimes to bend or break, an opponent's sword).

== Roles ==
Among the characters in jidaigeki are a parade of people with occupations unfamiliar to modern Japanese and especially to foreigners. They include:

=== Warriors ===
The warrior class included samurai, hereditary members in the military service of a daimyō or the shōgun, who was a samurai himself. Rōnin, samurai without masters, were also warriors, and like samurai, wore two swords, but they were without inherited employment or status. Bugeisha were men, or in some stories women, who aimed to perfect their martial arts, often by traveling throughout the country. Ninja were the secret service, specializing in stealth, the use of disguises, explosives, and concealed weapons.

=== Craftsmen ===
Craftsmen in jidaigeki included metalworkers (often abducted to mint counterfeit coins), bucket-makers, carpenters and plasterers, and makers of woodblock prints for art or newspapers.

=== Merchants ===
In addition to the owners of businesses large and small, the jidaigeki often portray the employees. The bantō was a high-ranking employee of a merchant, the tedai, a lower helper. Many merchants employed children, or kozō. Itinerant merchants included the organized medicine-sellers, vegetable-growers from outside the city, and peddlers at fairs outside temples and shrines. In contrast, the great brokers in rice, lumber and other commodities operated sprawling shops in the city.

=== Governments ===
In the highest ranks of the shogunate were the rojū. Below them were the wakadoshiyori, then the various bugyō or administrators, including the jisha bugyō (who administered temples and shrines), the kanjō bugyō (in charge of finances) and the two Edo machi bugyō. These last alternated by month as chief administrator of the city. Their role encompassed mayor, chief of police, and judge, and jury in criminal and civil matters.

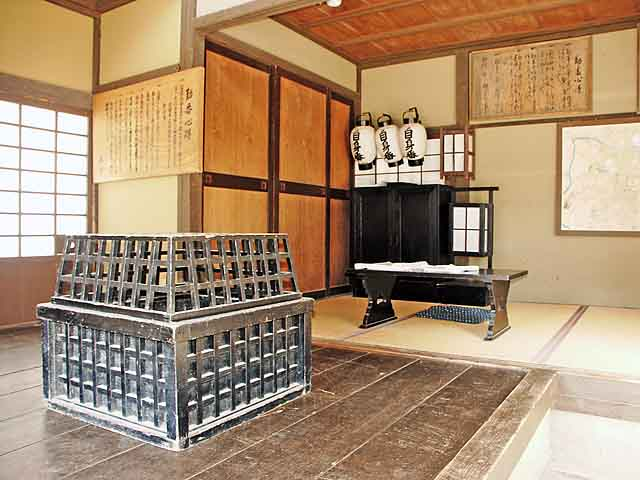
Ban'ya, Toei Uzumasa Studios

The machi bugyō oversaw the police and fire departments. The police, or machikata, included the high-ranking yoriki and the dōshin below them; both were samurai. In jidaigeki, they often have full-time patrolmen, okappiki and shitappiki, who were commoners. (Historically, such people were irregulars and were called to service only when necessary.) Zenigata Heiji is an okappiki. The police lived in barracks at Hatchōbori in Edo. They manned ban'ya, the watch-houses, throughout the metropolis. The jitte was the symbol of the police, from yoriki to shitappiki.

A separate police force handled matters involving samurai. The ōmetsuke were high-ranking officials in the shogunate; the metsuke and kachi-metsuke, lower-ranking police who could detain samurai. Yet another police force investigated arson-robberies, while Shinto shrines and Buddhist temples fell under the control of another authority. The feudal nature of Japan made these matters delicate, and jurisdictional disputes were common in jidaigeki.

Edo had three fire departments. The daimyō-bikeshi were in the service of designated daimyōs; the jōbikeshi reported to the shogunate; while the machi-bikeshi, beginning under Yoshimune, were commoners under the administration of the machi-bugyō. Thus, even the fire companies have turf wars in the jidaigeki.

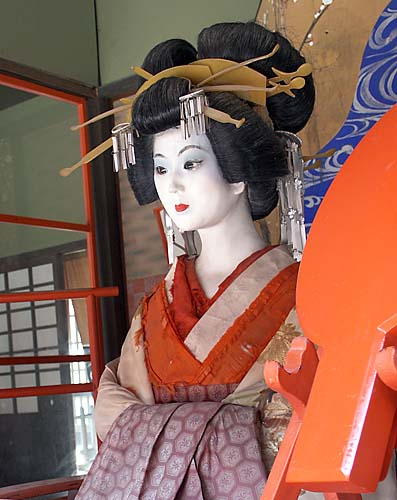
Licensed quarter on a set at Toei Uzumasa Studios, Kyoto

Each daimyō maintained a residence in Edo, where he lived during sankin-kōtai. His wife and children remained there even while he was away from Edo, and the ladies-in-waiting often feature prominently in jidaigeki. A high-ranking samurai, the Edo-garō, oversaw the affairs in the daimyō's absence. In addition to a staff of samurai, the household included ashigaru (lightly armed warrior-servants) and chūgen and yakko (servants often portrayed as flamboyant and crooked). Many daimyōs employed doctors, goten'i; their counterpart in the shogun's household was the okuishi. Count on them to provide the poisons that kill and the potions that heal.

=== Other ===
The cast of a wandering jidaigeki encountered a similar setting in each han. There, the karō were the kuni-garō and the jōdai-garō. Tensions between them have provided plots for many stories.

== Conventions ==
There are several dramatic conventions of jidaigeki:

- The heroes often wear eye makeup, and the villains often have disarranged hair.
- A contrived form of old-fashioned Japanese speech, using modern pronunciation and grammar with a high degree of formality and frequent archaisms.
- In long-running TV series, like Mito Kōmon and Zenigata Heiji, the lead and supporting actors sometimes change. This is done without any rationale for the change of appearance. The new actor simply appears in the place of the old one and the stories continue. This is similar to the James Bond film series or superhero films, in contrast with e.g. the British television program Doctor Who.
- In a sword fight, when a large number of villains attack the main character, they never attack at once. The main character first launches into a lengthy preamble detailing the crimes the villains have committed, at the end of which the villains then initiate hostilities. The villains charge singly or in pairs; the rest wait their turn to be dispatched and surround the main character until it is their turn to be easily defeated. Sword fights are the grand finale of the show and are conducted to specially crafted theme music for their duration.
- On television, even fatal sword cuts draw little blood, and often do not even cut through clothing. Villains are chopped down with deadly, yet completely invisible, sword blows. Despite this, blood or wounding may be shown for arrow wounds or knife cuts.
- In chambara films, the violence is generally considerably stylized, sometimes to such a degree that sword cuts cause geysers of blood from wounds. Dismemberment and decapitation are common as well.

=== Proverbs and catchphrases ===
Authors of jidaigeki work pithy sayings into the dialog. Here are a few:

- Tonde hi ni iru natsu no mushi: Like bugs that fly into the fire in the summer (they will come to their destruction)
- Shishi shinchū no mushi: A wolf in sheep's clothing (literally, a parasite in the lion's body)
- Kaji to kenka wa Edo no hana: Fires and brawls are the flower of Edo
- Ōedo happyaku yachō: "The eight hundred neighborhoods of Edo"
- Tabi wa michizure: "On the road you need a companion"

The authors of series invent their own catchphrases called kimarizerifu that the protagonist says at the same point in nearly every episode. In Mito Kōmon, in which the eponymous character disguises himself as a commoner, in the final sword fight, a sidekick invariably holds up an accessory bearing the shogunal crest and shouts, Hikae! Kono mondokoro ga me ni hairanu ka?: "Back! Can you not see this emblem?", revealing the identity of the hitherto unsuspected old man with a goatee beard. The villains then instantly surrender and beg forgiveness.

Likewise, Tōyama no Kin-san bares his tattooed shoulder and snarls, Kono sakurafubuki o miwasureta to iwasane zo!: "I won't let you say you forgot this cherry-blossom blizzard!" After sentencing the criminals, he proclaims, Kore nite ikken rakuchaku: "Case closed."

== Examples ==
=== Video games ===
The following are Japanese video games in the jidaigeki genre.

- Downtown Special: Kunio-kun no Jidaigeki dayo Zen'in Shūgō—sequel to Downtown Nekketsu Monogatari (River City Ransom in America) set in feudal Japan.
- Genji: Dawn of the Samurai
- Hakuōki series
- Kengo series
- Live A Live in the "Twilight of Edo Japan" scenario
- Ni-Oh series
- Ninja Gaiden series "Ninja Ryukenden", "Legend of the Ninja Dragon Sword" in Japan
- Nobunaga's Ambition series "Nobunaga no Yabō" in Japan
- Onimusha series
- Ryū ga Gotoku Kenzan!
- Ryū ga Gotoku Ishin!
- Samurai, a Sega arcade video game released in March 1980.
- Samurai Shodown series
- Samurai Warriors (Sengoku Musō in Japan) series
- Sekiro: Shadows Die Twice
- Sengoku Ace
- Soul of the Samurai
- Tenchu series
- The Last Blade series
- Warriors Orochi series
- Way of the Samurai series

Although jidaigeki is essentially a Japanese genre, there are also Western games that use the setting to match the same standards. Examples are Ghost of Tsushima, the Shogun: Total War series, and Japanese campaigns of Age of Empires III.

=== Anime and manga ===
- Azumi
- Basilisk
- Dororo
- Fire Tripper
- Gintama
- Hakuouki Shinsengumi Kitan
- Hyouge Mono
- Intrigue in the Bakumatsu – Irohanihoheto
- InuYasha
- Kaze Hikaru
- Lone Wolf and Cub
- Mushishi
- Ninja Resurrection
- Ninja Scroll
- Oi! Ryoma
- Otogizoshi
- Princess Mononoke
- Rakudai Ninja Rantarō
- Rurouni Kenshin
- Samurai 7
- Samurai Champloo
- Samurai Executioner
- Shigurui
- Shōnen Onmyōji
- The Yagyu Ninja Scrolls
- Samurai Deeper Kyo
- Sword of the Stranger
- Vagabond
- Yasuke

=== Live action television ===
- Taiga drama Series on NHK.

Title	Network	Notable cast	Duration	Notes
Zenigata Heiji		Hashizo Okawa	1966–84	
Akakage, The Masked Ninja	Fuji TV	Yūzaburō Sakaguchi, Yoshinobu Kaneko, Fuyukichi Maki	1967–1968	
Mito Kōmon	TBS	Eijirō Tōno, Ichirō Nakatani, Ryōtarō Sugi, Kōtarō Satomi	1969–2011	
Ōedo Sōsamō	TV Tokyo	Tetsurō Sagawa, Takeya Nakamura, Ryō Kurosawa	1970–1980	
Ōoka Echizen	TBS	Go Kato, Takashi Yamaguchi, Chiezō Kataoka	1970-99	
Daichūshingura	NTV	Toshiro Mifune, Tetsuya Watari, Masakazu Tamura	1971	
Kogarashi Monjirō	Fuji TV	Atsuo Nakamura	1972	
Ronin of the Wilderness	NTV	Toshiro Mifune	1972–1974	
Hissatsu Shikakenin	TV Asahi	Ken Ogata, Yoichi Hayashi, Sō Yamamura	1972–1973	
Kaiketsu Lion-Maru	Fuji TV	Tetsuya Ushio, Akiko Kujō, Norihiko Umechi, Kiyoshi Kobayashi	1972–1973	
Nemuri Kyōshirō	Kansai TV	Masakazu Tamura	1972	
Fuun Lion-Maru	Fuji TV	Tetsuya Ushio, Kazuo Kamoshida, Masaki Hayasaki	1973	
Lone Wolf and Cub	NTV	Kinnosuke Yorozuya	1973–1976	
Hissatsu Shiokinin	TV Asahi	Tsutomu Yamazaki, Masaya Oki, Makoto Fujita	1973	
Oshizamurai Kiichihōgan	NTV	Tomisaburo Wakayama, Shintaro Katsu	1973-74	
Tasukenin Hashiru	TV Asahi	Takahiro Tamura, Ichirō Nakatani, So Yamamura, Hiroshi Miyauchi	1973–1974	
Zatoichi	Fuji TV	Shintaro Katsu	1974–1979	
Onihei Hankachō	NET	Tetsurō Tamba, Takahiro Tamura, Akihiko Hirata, Ichirō Nakatani	1975	
Edo no Kaze	Fuji TV	Yūzō Kayama, Keiju Kobayashi, Shigeru Tsuyuguchi	1975–1979	
Shin Hissatsu Shiokinin	TV Asahi	Tsutomu Yamazaki, Shōhei Hino, Makoto Fujita	1973	
Abarenbō Shōgun	TV Asahi	Ken Matsudaira, Ichirō Arishima, Saburō Kitajima	1978–2003	
The Yagyu Conspiracy	FUJI TV	Sonny Chiba, Hiroyuki Sanada, Mikio Narita, So Yamamura, Yūki Meguro	1978-79	
Akō Rōshi (1979 TV series)	TV Asahi	Kinnosuke Yorozuya, Masakazu Tamura, Mikio Narita, Ken Matsudaira	1979	
Hissatsu Shigotonin	TV Asahi	Makoto Fujita, Gorō Ibuki, Kunihiko Mitamura	1979–1981	
Shadow Warriors	Fuji TV	Sonny Chiba, Mikio Narita, Hiroyuki Sanada, Shōhei Hino	1980–1985	
Tōyama no Kin-san	TV Asahi	Hideki Takahashi	1982–1986	
Ōoku	TV Asahi	Tomisaburō Wakayama, Tetsurō Tamba, Masaya Oki, Masahiko Tsugawa	1983	
Sanada Taiheiki	NHK	Tsunehiko Watase, Tetsurō Tamba, Masao Kusakari	1985	
Onihei Hankachō	Fuji TV	Kichiemon Nakamura, Meiko Kaji	1989–2016	
Kenkaku Shōbai	Fuji TV	Makoto Fujita	1998–2010	
Ōoku (2003 TV series)	FujiTV		2003	
Jin	TBS	Takao Ōsawa, Miki Nakatani, Haruka Ayase	2009–2011	

== Prominent directors ==
Names are in Western order, with the surname after the given name.

- Hideo Gosha
- Kon Ichikawa
- Hiroshi Inagaki
- Akira Kurosawa
- Masaki Kobayashi
- Shozo Makino
- Kenji Misumi
- Kenji Mizoguchi
- Kihachi Okamoto
- Kimiyoshi Yasuda
- Akira Inoue
- Tomu Uchida
- Eiichi Kudo
- Tokuzō Tanaka
- Koreyoshi Kurahara
- Kazuo Ikehiro

== Prominent actors ==
- Tsumasaburō Bandō
- Denjirō Ōkōchi
- Chiyonosuke Azuma
- Utaemon Ichikawa
- Ryūtarō Ōtomo
- Kanjūrō Arashi
- Jūshirō Konoe
- Ryūnosuke Tsukigata
- Chiezō Kataoka
- Ichikawa Raizō VIII
- Hashizo Okawa
- Yorozuya Kinnosuke
- Toshiro Mifune
- Shintaro Katsu
- Tomisaburo Wakayama
- Kōtarō Satomi
- Asahi Kurizuka
- Hiroki Matsukata
- Masakazu Tamura
- Kin'ya Kitaōji
- Sonny Chiba
- Hideki Takahashi
- Ken Matsudaira

== Influence ==
Star Wars creator George Lucas has admitted to being inspired significantly by the period works of Akira Kurosawa, and many thematic elements found in Star Wars bear the influence of chanbara filmmaking. In an interview, Lucas has specifically cited the fact that he became acquainted with the term jidaigeki while in Japan, and it is widely assumed that he took inspiration for the term Jedi from this.
