= Yaji Kita =

Yaji Kita refers to the two main characters in Jippensha Ikku's Tōkaidōchū Hizakurige.

Yaji Kita may also refer to one of the many adaptations of that story:

- Yaji and Kita: Yasuda's Rescue, 1927 film version
- Yaji and Kita: The Battle of Toba Fushimi, 1928 film version
- Travel Chronicles of Yaji and Kita, 1956 film version
- Yaji and Kita: The Midnight Pilgrims, 2005 film version
