= Nobuko Fushimi =

Japanese actress and singer

Nobuko Fushimi 伏見信子
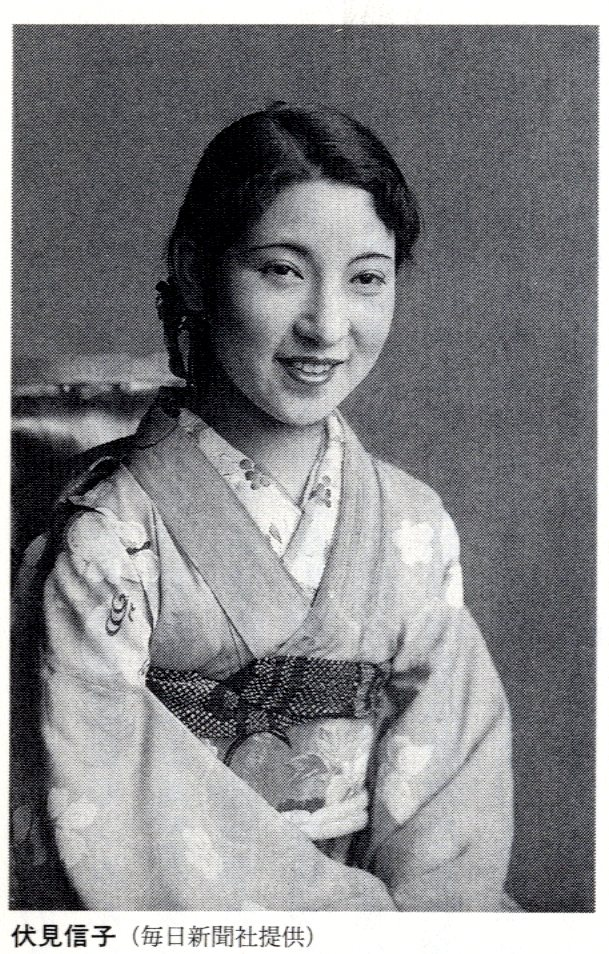
- Born: October 10, 1915; Tokyo City, Empire of Japan
- Occupations: Actress; singer
- Years active: 1926-1947
- Spouse: Akira Matsudaira (m. 1936; div. 1937)

Nobuko Fushimi (伏見 信子, Fushimi Nobuko, born October 10, 1915) is a Japanese actress and singer who was active in the 1930s. She was also known by her alias Nobue Fushimi (伏見 延江).

== Life ==
Nobuko Fushimi was born on October 10, 1915, in Kojima, Asakusa, Tokyo, the daughter of shinpa actor Saburo Fushimi. She graduated from Dōshisha Girls' School, Faculty of Girls' Studies. Because her father was a shinpa actor, she appeared on shinpa stages as a child actor with her elder sister Naoe Fushimi from a young age. In 1926, she joined Teikoku Kinema with her elder sister.

In 1927, she signed with Bandō Tsumasaburō Productions with Naoe, and in November of the same year, she joined the Nikkatsu Taishōgun Modern Theater Department. She moved to the jidaigeki department and starred in the movies Daichi ni Tatsu and Shōshimin.

In 1928, Fushimi entered Dōshisha Women's Higher School for Girls. She played the leading role in Haru mataha oka he while attending school for four years. In 1931, she co-starred with Denjirō Ōkōchi in Oatsurae Jirokichi Koshi. She left Nikkatsu the same year. Around this time, she was dating Takeo Tabe, a star athlete at Meiji University. In 1933, she joined Shōchiku Kamata. She became a popular actress when she starred in Heinosuke Gosho's movie Jyūku no Haru. The same year, she co-starred in Yasujiro Ozu's Passing Fancy with Den Obinata, which made her popularity unmovable. In 1934, Fushimi became an exclusive actress for the Tokyo Takarazuka Revue. The next year, she moved to Shinkō Kinema with Naoe. She then starred in Keikosen and Akatsuki no Reijin at Ōizumi. In 1936, she co-starred in Hatsukoi Nikki with singer Akira Matsudaira in the theme song "Hanakotoba no Uta", and became a dominant movie star. She married Matsudaira during the shooting of the movie, and Matsudaira participated in the Fushimi sisters' traveling theatrical troupe, but the two divorced a little over a year later.

In 1937, Fushimi joined Shochiku Shitakamo and performed with Kōtaro Bandō and Kōkichi Takada. She left Shochiku in 1940, and began performing on stage in 1941, after which she formed a band and remained active until 1947, when she retired. Fushimi later remarried and ran a restaurant and other businesses. In 1971, she appeared on Tokyo 12 Channel in the program Natsukashi no Utagoe ("Nostalgic singing voices"). She performed duets with her ex-husband, Akira Matsudaira, including "Hanagotoba no Uta" and "Hatsukoi Nikki".

Fushimi and her elder sister Naoe Fushimi were very close sisters until Naoe's death in 1982.

== Filmography ==
- Daichi ni Tatsu (1927)
- Shōshimin (1927)
- Haru mataha oka he (1928)
- Oatsurae Jirokichi Koshi (1931)
- Jyūku no Haru (1933)
- Passing Fancy (1933)
- Keikosen (1935)
- Akatsuki no Reijin (1935)
- Hatsukoi Nikki (1936)

== See also ==
- Jidaigeki
- Shinpa
- Takarazuka Revue
