= Naoe Fushimi =

Japanese actress (1908–1982)

- 伏見直江
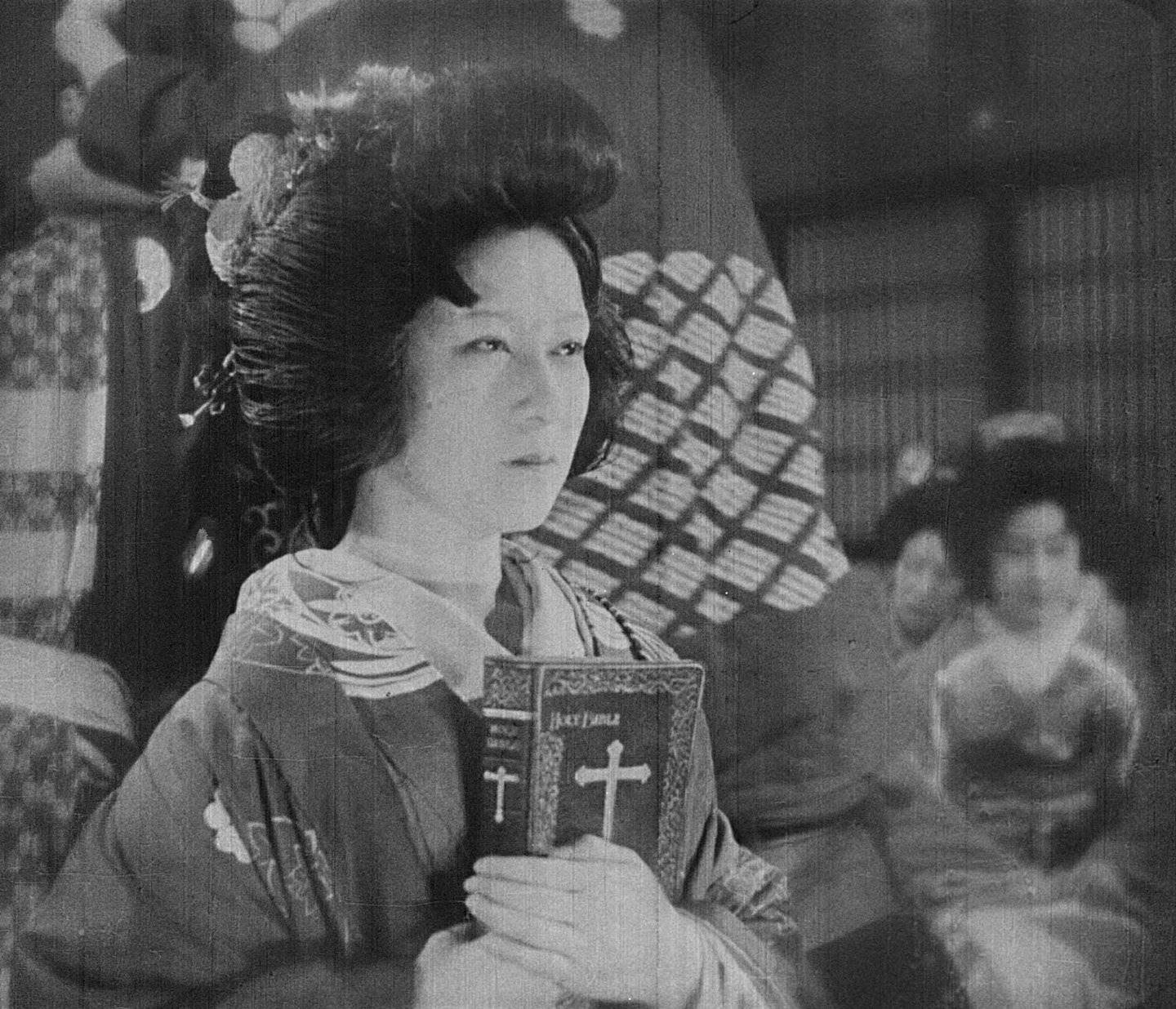
- Naoe Fushimi in Junkyō kesshi Nihon nijūroku seijin (殉教血史 日本二十六聖人) directed by Tomiyasu Ikeda (1931)
- Born: November 10, 1908; Tokyo, Japan
- Died: May 16, 1982 (age 73)
- Other names: Fushimi Naoe, Teruko Fujima, Naoko Kirishima
- Occupation: Actress
- Relatives: Nobuko Fushimi (sister)

Naoe Fushimi (November 10, 1908 – May 16, 1982; in Japanese: 伏見直江 ) was a Japanese actress in films of the 1920s and 1930s. She was the older sister of actress Nobuko Fushimi.

== Early life ==
Fushimi was born in Tokyo, the daughter of a shinpa actor, Saburo Fushimi. Her younger sister Nobuko Fushimi also became an actress. Both of Saburo Fushimi's daughters began their stage careers as girls, and they later appeared in some films together.

== Career ==
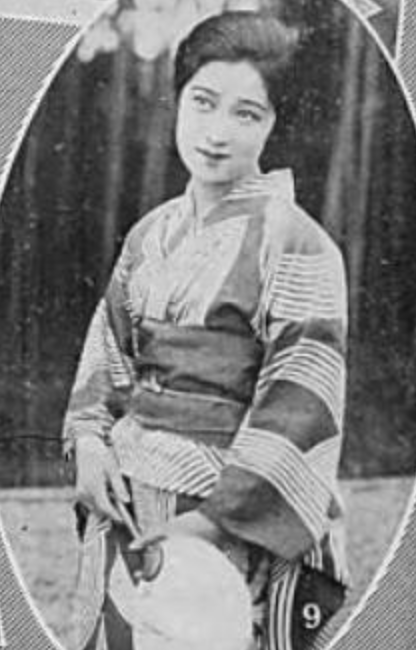
Naoe Fushimi, from a 1928 publication

Fushimi acted on the stage and in films. She was a member of the troupe at Tsukiji Shogekijo (Tsukiji Little Theater), and appeared in Japanese films during the 1920s and 1930s, with a few later appearances. She began her career in the silent era, with the Nikkatsu studio. Oya no nai suzume (1923) was her first screen appearance, using a screen name, "Teruko Fujima". She was often cast in historical dramas about samurai, and in seductive "vamp" roles. Her last film role was a cameo as an old woman in Zatoichi in Desperation (1972). She worked with many film directors, including Daisuke Itō, Sadao Yamanaka, Teinosuke Kinugasa, Minoru Inuzuka, and Kiyohiko Ushihara.

In the 1940s, Fushimi acted in stage productions with her husband in Hawaii. In her later years, she helped her sister run a restaurant in Japan.

== Selected filmography ==
- A Diary of Chuji's Travels (1927, Chūji tabi nikki)
- Jirokichi the Burglar (1931, Oatsurae Jirokichi Koshi)
- An Actor's Revenge (1935, Yukinojo henge)
- Men Without Arms (1936, directed by Saburo Aoyama)
- The Pickpockets' House (1936)
- The Story of Yukinojo (1936)
- Zatoichi in Desperation (1972, Shin Zatoichi monogatari: Oreta tsue)

== Personal life ==
Fushimi married stage actor Teisuke Kudo. The couple lived in Brazil for about ten years, but returned to Japan in 1959. She died in 1982, at the age of 73.
