= Sharebon =

Japanese literary genre

Sharebon (洒落本), which can be roughly translated as "book of manners", was a pre-modern Japanese literary genre, produced during the middle of the Edo period from the 1720s all the way to the end of the 18th century. Plots almost invariably took place in the Yoshiwara pleasure quarters, and usually revolved around the misadventures of two contrasting male archetypes, the "Tsu" or "sophisticate", and the Tanketsu or "one who only pretends at sophistication." The writing had a huge emphasis on humor and dialogue, without much in the way of actual dramatic or narrative plot elements. Physically, sharebon were produced using woodblock print, and published as individual booklets measuring, on average, 4.5 inches (11 cm) in width and 6 inches (15 cm) in height. The booklets themselves containing anywhere from 60 to 100 pages. Most booklets had an illustration placed either right after the title page or along with the preface. Sharebon are considered a subgenre of gesaku.

== Characteristics ==
Sharebon were published on brown cover booklets and were known as "brown backs" by readers of the day.

Sharebon was a satirical genre focused on the culture around the pleasure quarters, and particularly on the Yoshiwara district, although some sharebon are set in other areas. As a subgenre of gesaku, humor was a major aspect to each story. "The sharebon described the manners, language, and clothes of the men who frequented the licensed quarters and were adept in their ritualized etiquette." Often these men would attempt to flaunt their knowledge, only to be socially inept and ridiculed by the courtesans. There was a huge emphasis on conversational dialogue as opposed to formal speech forms common for literature at the time. In fact the stories are presented almost exclusively in natural dialogue cast in the vernacular of the Edo townsfolk. The sharebon authors would incorporate the equivalent of our contractions, drawls, hesitation particles, and even ungrammatical utterances. The inclusion of such realistic dialogue is an innovation of the time.

According to James Araki, Yūshi Hōgen (c. 1770), or "The Playboy Dialect," by an anonymous author whose signature reads Inaka Rojin Tada no Jijii ('Plain Old Codger, an Old Man from the backwoods') is the work that established the conventional structural and stylistic pattern for the sharebon. As Araki later argues, Yūshi Hōgen became the archetypal sharebon story, where other writers would often compose their stories to fit within this structure. Yūshi Hōgen combined dramatic dialogue with the satire of Edo-based Dangibon to create the form that typifies sharebon as a genre.

The goal of the sharebon was to simultaneously satirize and showcase the floating world of Yoshiwara, a licensed district that was wholly separate from everyday life and society. The pleasure quarters themselves had a myriad of rules and customs and to know how to conduct oneself in this world was to be considered a Tsujin (man of Tsu) a sophisticate or connoisseur. However, sharebon largely focused on the Half Tsu, satirizing his attempts at connoisseurship and emphasizing his inability to achieve this social and aesthetic ideal.

Sharebon were ostensibly about the physical world, and as such, there was plenty of product placement and references to real world places and people. The careful reader would be familiar with the references made to certain specific courtesans, even if their names were subtly changed, and many authors succeeded in making reference to real world products such as liquors, wines, food and clothing, endorsing the products themselves and effectively using sharebon stories as advertisemenrs for their wares.

== Developments ==
Sharebon existed between the 1720s and 1840s. This interval is commonly divided into three stages: early, middle and late. While there is some debate as to the origins of sharebon, most scholars point to Edo as being the place where the genre originated.

=== Early period ===
The early period existed between the 1720s and the 1760s.

The earliest text belonging to the genre is identified as Ryōha Shigen (両巴巵言), which was written by Gekishō Sensei (撃鉦先生) in 1728. It establishes the traditional form and style of the genre. Another text published in the early period was Hijiri no Yūkaku (聖遊廓, "The Holy Man's Brothel", 1757): Buddha, Confucius, and Laozi all go to a brothel in Ōsaka.

Early sharebon were influenced by ukiyo-zoshi – which became popular in the late 17th century – and directly followed by the ninjobon of the 19th century. Sharebon were also influenced by Enshi, or Chinese courtesan literature. Many of the sharebon of this time were written in kanbun (Chinese prose), and were similar in size to Chinese books, bore Chinese titles, and had a preface and afterword in much the same style.

=== Middle period ===
Yūshi Hōgen or "The Playboy Dialect", by Inaka Rojin Tada no Jijii

The middle period existed between the 1770s and the 1780s. During this time period, the genre reached its peak of popularity. Authors experimented with new locations, characters, and types of humor. It was at this time that Yūshi Hōgen was codified as the basic model for future sharebon.

- Yūshi Hōgen (遊子方言, "The Playboy Dialect", 1770): a man-about-town and a youth visit Yoshiwara. The man attempts to flaunt his knowledge of the latest fashions and trends, but is wrong and ridiculed by the courtesans. The youth turns out to be far more socially adept in the licensed quarters and receives better treatment. The Playboy Dialect serves as the archetypal sharebon, establishing the main beats of the genre: beginning with a description of the journey to Yoshiwara, a comparison between the half-baked or "pretender" Tsu with a true sophisticate, and the entirety of the story taking place over a day and a night. Almost all subsequent sharebon would follow this pattern.
- Tatsumi no Sono (辰巳之園, 1770)
- Musukobeya (令子洞房, 1785)
- Tsūgen Sōmagaki (通言総籬, "The Palace", 1787)
- Keiseikai Shijūhatte (傾城買四十八手, "The Forty-Eight Grips in Buying a Whore", 1790)
- Shikake Bunko (仕懸文庫, 1791)
- Nishiki no Ura (錦之裏, 1791)
- Shōgi Kinuburui (娼妓絹籭, "The Courtesan's Silken Sieve", 1791)

=== Late period ===
The late period existed between the 1790s and the 1840s. Santō Kyōden, "the leading writer of fiction at the end of the eighteenth century," wrote a number of important sharebon, which moved the genre away from describing the Tsu and half-Tsu dichotomy and focused more on the emotional consequences of the relationships formed between the male customers and female courtesans of the licensed quarters. This shift proved widely popular innovation for the genre and directly contributed to the ninjobon that would succeed it.

In 1790, the Kansei Reforms, led by Matsudaira Sadanobu, introduced strict censorship and penalties for "frivolous books". This had a significant impact on the sharebon genre. Notable works included:

- Shikake Bunko (仕懸文庫, 1791)
- Nishiki no Ura (錦之裏, 1791)
- Shōgi Kinuburui (娼妓絹籭, "The Courtesan's Silken Sieve", 1791)
- Keiseikai Futasujimichi (傾城買二筋道, "Two Different Ways of Buying a Courtesan", 1798)

While the first three of these works saw immediate popularity following production, they also resulted in their author, Santō Kyōden, being confined to his home for fifty days in manacles as punishment for violating publication laws. This led to Kyōden giving up his career in sharebon from then on, despite his great popularity by that point. While this marked the decline of the genre, sharebon did not entirely cease directly after Kyōden's punishment – authors such as Umebori Kokuga (梅暮里谷峨) had success in continuing the genre; however, these works were markedly different from earlier works. For example, Kokuga's Keiseikai Futasujimichi, which argues that a courtesan's affection is more easily obtained by an ugly older man because "his feelings are deeper and purer," lacks the satirical mockery of connoisseurship that previously defined the genre and instead focuses on sentimentality, emotions, and sincerity. This shift in attitude and the general decline of the sharebon genre eventually "gave way to the ninjōbon in response to popular demand for sustained stories with greater depth of character."

== Bibliography ==
- Keene, Donald (1976). World Within Walls: Japanese Literature of the Pre-Modern Era 1600–1867. New York: Grove Press. ISBN 0-394-17074-1.
- Kubota, Jun (2007). Iwanami Nihon Koten Bungaku Jiten [Iwanami Dictionary of Japanese Classical Literature] (in Japanese). Tokyo: Iwanami Shoten. ISBN 978-4-00-080310-6. OCLC 122941872.
- Nihon Koten Bungaku Daijiten: Kan'yakuban [A Comprehensive Dictionary of Classical Japanese Literature: Concise Edition]. Tōkyō: Iwanami Shoten. 1986. ISBN 4-00-080067-1. OCLC 22820487.
