= Niwa Chozan =

- 丹羽 樗山

Personal details
- Born: May 18, 1659 Shimōsa Province, Japan
- Died: May 23, 1741 (aged 82) Japan

Niwa Jūrōemon Tadaaki (Japanese: 丹羽 十郎右衛門 忠明; 1659–1741), better known by the nom-de-plume Niwa Chozan (丹羽 樗山) or Issai Chozan (佚斎 樗山), was a Japanese samurai and gesaku author.

== Biography ==
Niwa was a retainer of the Sekiyado Domain and student of the writings of Wang Yangming and Kumazawa Banzan. Alongside Masuho Zankō, Niwa is credited as one of the originators of the dangibon genre.

In 1727, Niwa published the Inaka Sōji, a collection of essays and short stories. The best known of these stories is Neko no Myōjutsu (The Cat's Eerie Skill) — an allegory on mushin and the maintenance of a tranquil state of mind in the face of danger, known as mokkei (木鶏). Obscure until the 19th century, Neko no Myōjutsu was promoted by Yamaoka Tesshū as reading material for students of kendō and is today most often associated with practitioners of his school, Ittō Shōden Mutō-ryū.

Niwa died in 1741.
