= Kokkeibon =

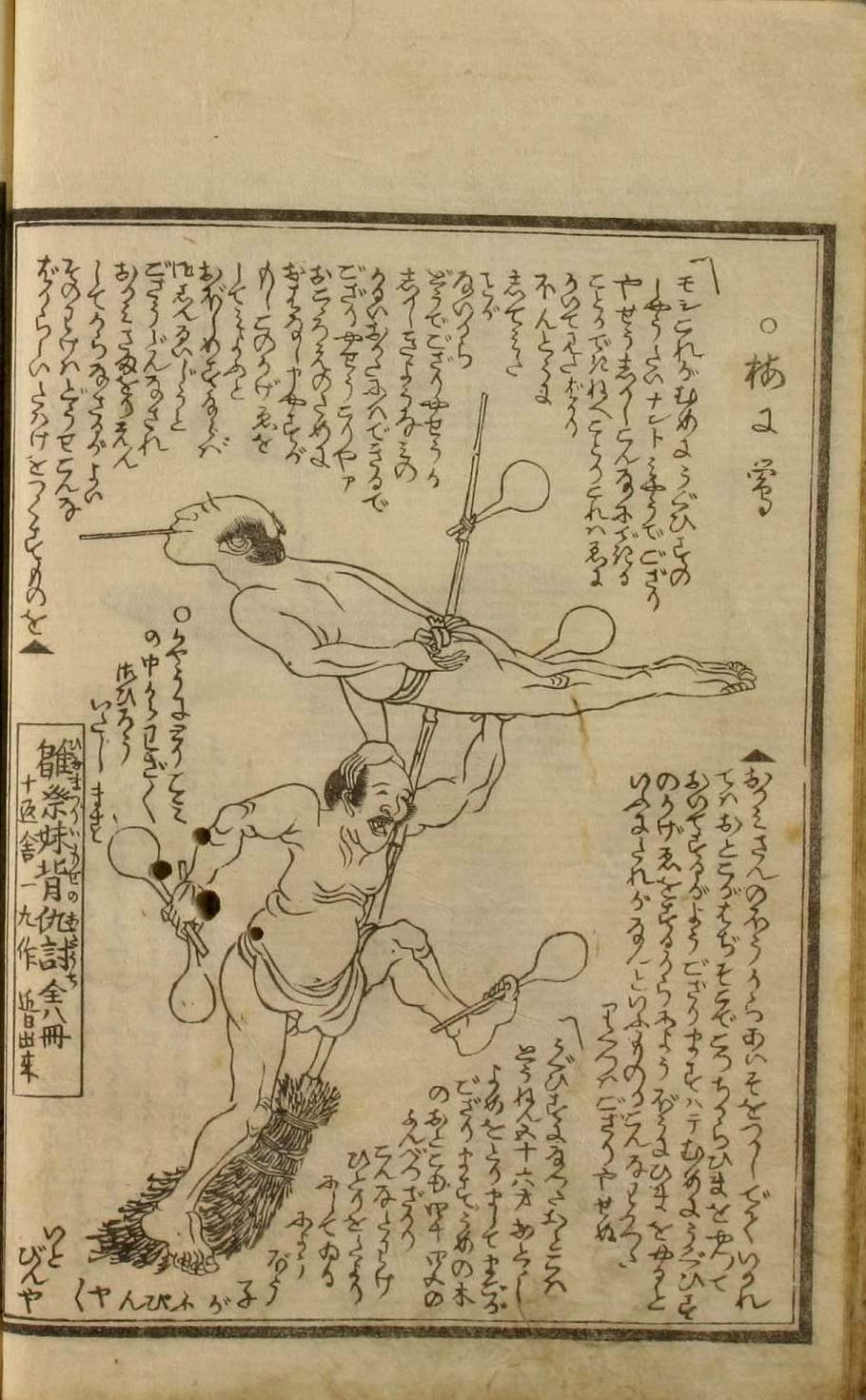
From Otsuriki (1810) by Jippensha Ikku, a book about how to make shadow pictures

The kokkeibon (滑稽本; literally "comical book") was a genre and type of early modern Japanese novel. It came into being late in the Edo period during the 19th century. As a genre, it depicted the comical behavior occurring in commoners' daily lives.

The kokkeibon genre is the successor of the dangibon genre. Jippensha Ikku's Tōkaidōchū Hizakurige (1802–1822) is identified as the first representative novel. A less strict definition includes the dangibon as an "early kokkeibon".

Kokkeibon generally consists of dialogue among the main characters and includes illustrations. The genre was most popular between 1804 and 1830, and is best represented by the works of Jippensha Ikku and Shikitei Sanba.

== See also ==
- Gesaku
