= Shank's mare =

English expression

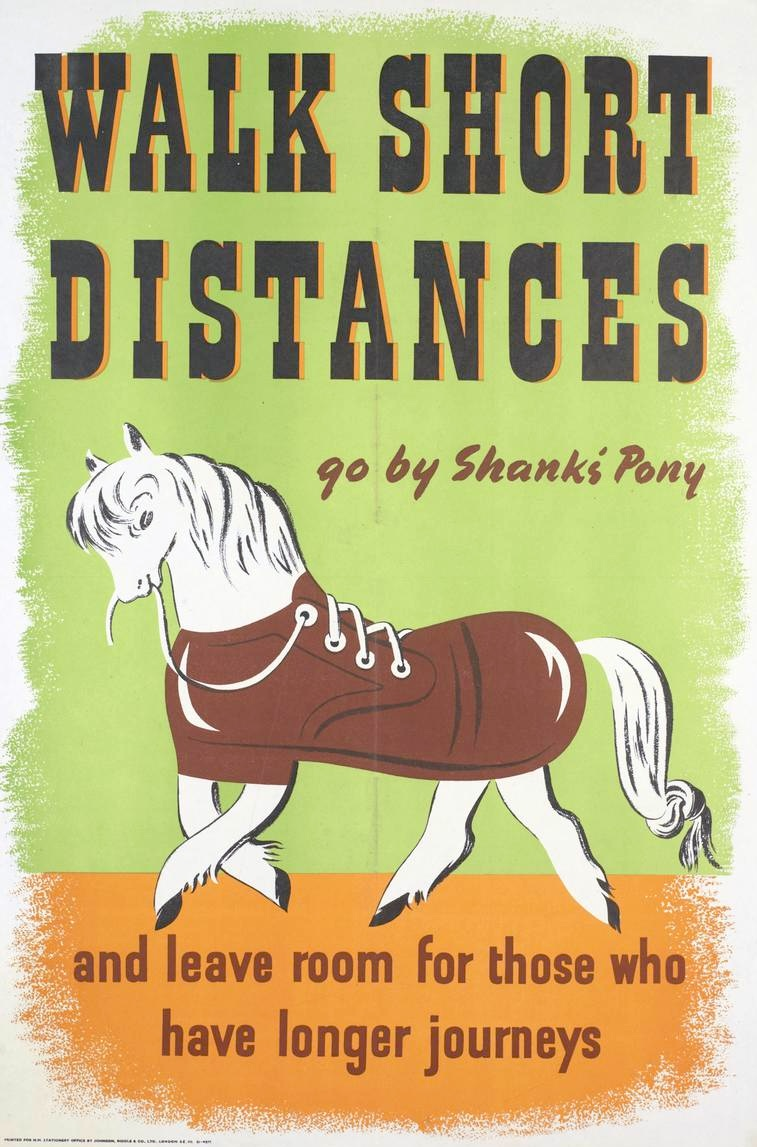
A British World War II-era poster encouraging travel on foot

Shank's mare (and numerous variants such as shanks' mare, shanks mare, shanks's mare, shanks's nag, shanks-nag, shanks's pony) is an expression, primarily found in the United Kingdom, that refers to walking.

== Origin ==
The Oxford English Dictionary, which gives the headword forms Shanks' (or Shanks's) mare, pony, explains that shank means "that part of the leg which extends from the knee to the ankle" or, more generally and in the plural "one's legs". The term is first attested in a poem of 1774 by Robert Fergusson: "And auld shanks-nag wad tire, I dread, To pace to Berwick".

== Similar expressions in other languages ==
Shank's mare may also refer to Tōkaidōchū Hizakurige, a Japanese comic picaresque novel (kokkeibon) by Jippensha Ikku, written in 12 parts between 1765 and 1831, known in translation as Shank's Mare.

An equivalent in Cantonese is Bus No. 11 (11號巴士), referring to the shape of calves.

In New Zealand English an equivalent term is the "Waewae Express", from the Maori language term for feet.
