= A Diary of Chuji's Travels =

1927 film directed by Daisuke Itō

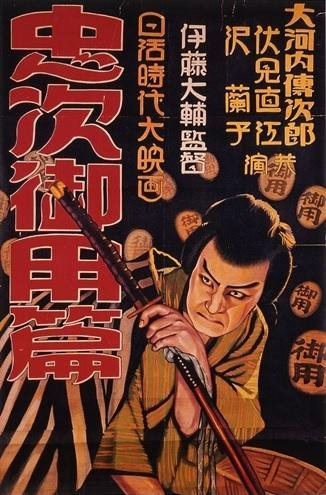
- Theatrical release poster
- Directed by: Daisuke Itō
- Written by: Daisuke Itō
- Starring: Denjirō Ōkōchi; Naoe Fushimi; Ranko Sawa
- Cinematography: Rokuzō Watarai; Hiromitsu Karasawa
- Production company: Nikkatsu
- Release date: 1927
- Running time: 107 minutes (existing print at 16 fps)
- Country: Japan
- Language: Japanese (intertitles)

A Diary of Chuji's Travels (Japanese: 忠次旅日記, Hepburn: Chūji Tabi Nikki) is a silent Japanese jidaigeki made in 1927 starring Denjirō Ōkōchi and directed by Daisuke Itō. It was originally released in three parts, all of which were long thought to be lost until portions of the second part and much of the third part were discovered and restored in 1991. Since the film had once been voted in a 1959 Kinema Junpō poll as the best Japanese film of all time, its discovery was significant. At the time of its release, Itō was the leader of a new style of samurai films that featured outlaw heroes and fast-cut sword fighting scenes.

== Plot ==
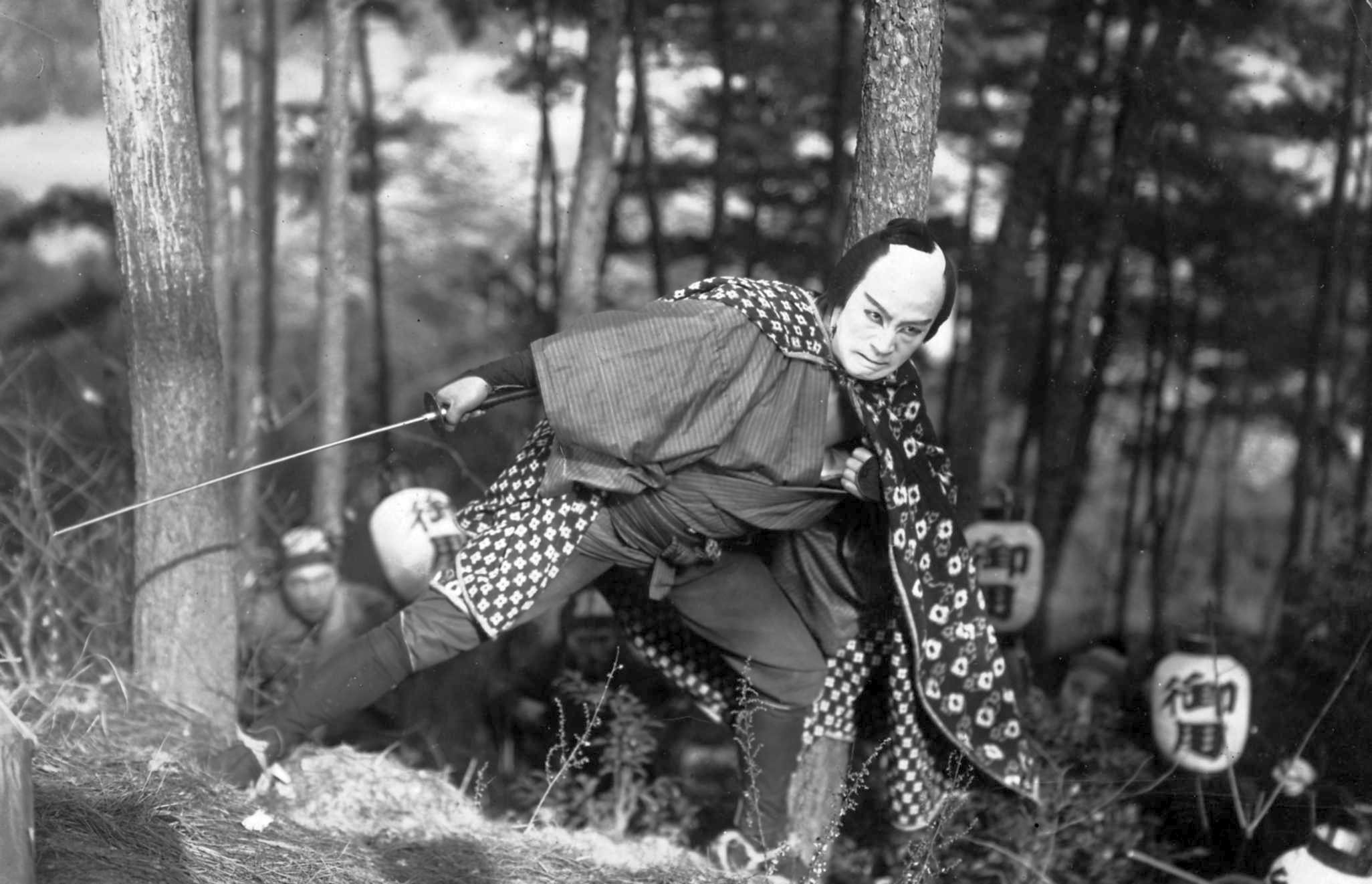
Denjirō Ōkōchi portraying the Yakuza.

The three films focus on the travels of the kindly yakuza boss Kunisada Chūji. The existing print begins with Chuji on the road, fleeing the law while taking care of Kantaro, the son of a dead friend. He leaves Kantaro with Kabe Yasuemon, an honorable local boss, but is shocked to find out that his own men have been committing robberies using his own name. Angry, Chuji hits the road and eventually settles in another town, assuming another name and working as a clerk for a sake brewery. Okume, the daughter of the brewer, falls in love with Chuji, but he ignores her. When he saves her brother from trouble with the Otozo gang, his identity is revealed and the police close in. Okume kills herself and Chuji flees, but the palsy he had been suffering from worsens and he is finally caught. His henchmen, however, succeed in rescuing him and bring him back to his home village. Unable to walk and confined to bed, Chuji is hidden in a storehouse. His woman, Oshina, discovers that one of his men has betrayed him, but it is too late. Despite the valiant efforts of his men to hold off the police, Chuji is finally arrested by the authorities.

== Cast ==
- Denjirō Ōkōchi as Kunisada Chūji
- Naoe Fushimi as Oshina
- Ranko Sawa as Okume
- Hideo Nakamura as Kantarō
- Kichiji Nakamura as Kabe Yasuemon
- Motoharu Isokawa as Kihei, a sake brewer
- Yujirō Asahina as Masakichi
- Seinosuke Sakamoto as Bunzō
- Kajō Onoe as Otozō
- Kan'emon Nakamura

== Reception ==
In Kinema Junpō's poll of the best Japanese films of 1927, part two was number one and part three was number four. The British Film Institute listed the complete picture as the best Japanese film of 1927, praising Denjirō Ōkōchi's performance and the "flair and flamboyance" of Daisuke Itō's direction.

== Versions ==
If the original three parts were projected together, the entire film would have totaled over four hours. The currently restored print combines the discovered sections into one film. A further digital restoration was undertaken in 2011.

== See also ==
- List of rediscovered films
