= The Giant (1938 film) =

- Directed by: Mansaku Itami
- Screenplay by: Mansaku Itami
- Based on: Les Misérables; 1862 novel by Victor Hugo
- Produced by: Nobuyoshi Morita
- Starring: Denjirô Ôkôchi; Setsuko Hara; Sadao Maruyama
- Cinematography: Jun Yasumoto
- Music by: Nobuo Ito
- Distributed by: Toho
- Release date: 11 April 1938
- Running time: 127 minutes
- Country: Japan
- Language: Japanese

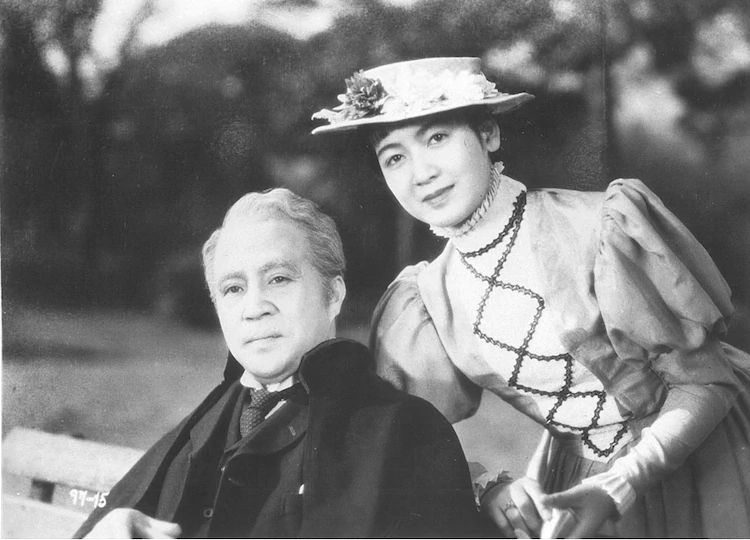
Denjirō Ōkōchi and Setsuko Hara in Kyojin-den (巨人傳) directed by Mansaku Itami, 1938.

The Giant (巨人傳, Kyojinden) is a 1938 black-and-white Japanese film directed by Mansaku Itami and based on the famous five-part novel Les Misérables by French poet and novelist Victor Hugo. The film's setting was changed from France to Edo period Japan.

The great jidai-geki star Denjiro Okochi plays the Jean Valjean role, and an eighteen-year-old Setsuko Hara features as Cosette.

== Cast ==
| Actor | Role |
|---|---|
| Denjiro Okochi | Sanpei/Onuma/Sankichi |
| Setsuko Hara | Chiyo |
| Masako Tsutsumi | Okuni |
| Hinako Katagiri | Chiyo bambina |
| Ryo Sayama | Ryoma Seike |
| Sadao Maruyama | Yajiro Sogabe |
| Yo Shiomi | sacerdote |
| Yoshio Kosugi | Narutoya |
