= Nakamura Kichiemon I =

Japanese actor and kabuki performer

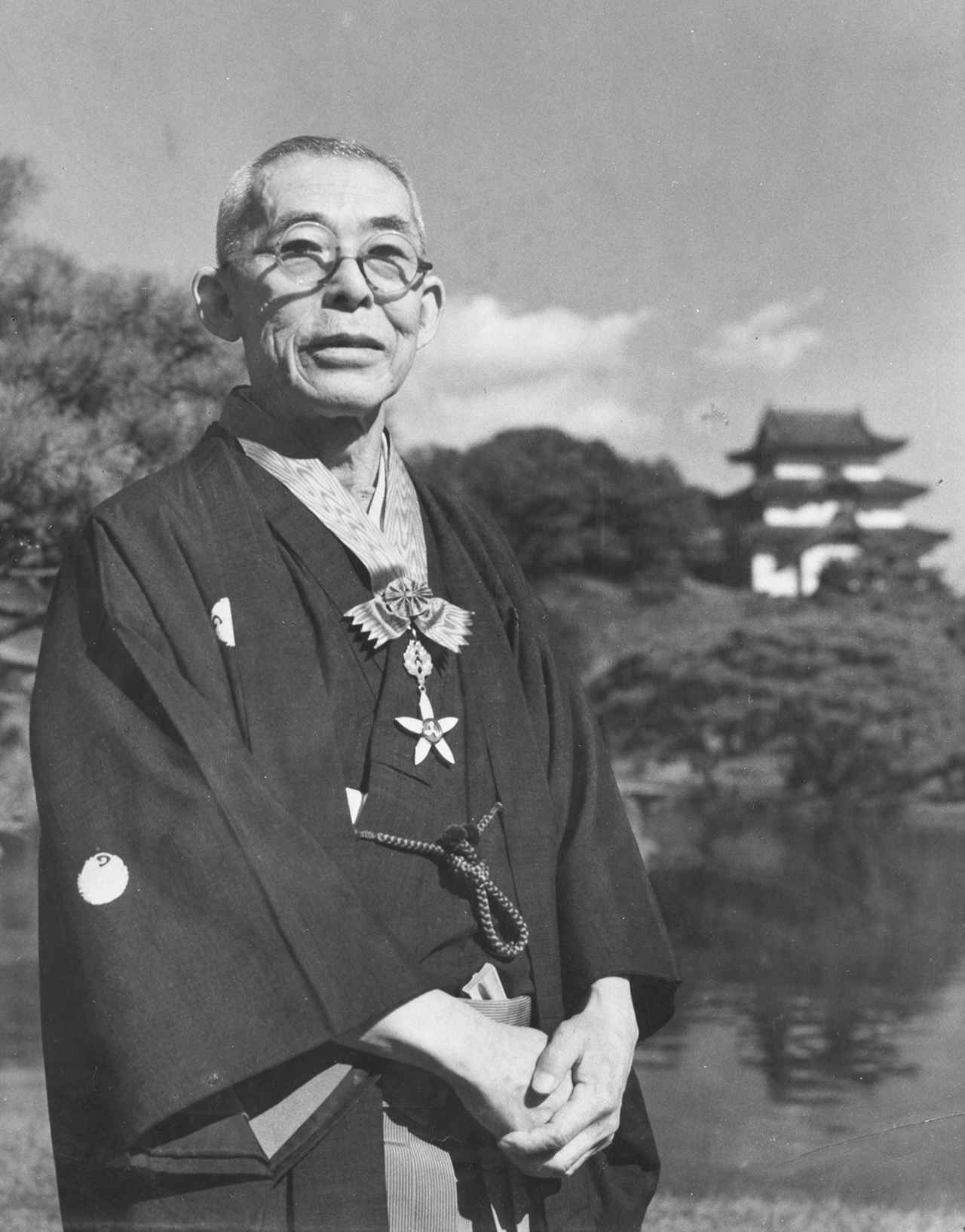
- Nakamura Kichiemon I wearing the Grand Order of Culture(1951)
- Born: Tatsujirō Namino (波野辰次郎) (Note: While the stage names of all kabuki actors have retained traditional order (Surname-Givenname) on Wikipedia, birth names of those born after the Meiji Restoration are in Western order (Givenname-Surname).); March 24, 1886; Asakusa, Tokyo, Japan
- Died: September 8, 1954 (aged 68)
- Occupation: Kabuki actor
- Father: Nakamura Karoku III
- Relatives: Nakamura Karoku I (grandfather); Nakamura Tokizō III (younger brother); Nakamura Kanzaburō XVII (younger brother); Masako Fujima (daughter); Matsumoto Hakuō I (son-in-law); Matsumoto Hakuō II (grandson); Nakamura Kichiemon II (grandson/adoptive son); Matsumoto Koshirō X (great-grandson) (Note: Son of Matsumoto Hakuō II); Kio Matsumoto (great-granddaughter) (Note: Daughter of Matsumoto Hakuō II); Takako Matsu (great-granddaughter) (Note: Daughter of Matsumoto Hakuō II); Yoko Namino (great-granddaughter) (Note: Daughter of Nakamura Kichiemon II); Ichikawa Somegorō VIII (great-great-grandson) (Note: Son of Matsumoto Koshirō X); Mio Matsuda (great-great-granddaughter) (Note: Daughter of Matsumoto Koshirō X); Onoe Ushinosuke VII (great-great-grandson) (Note: Son of his great-granddaughter Yoko Namino (daughter of Nakamura Kichiemon II) and kabuki actor Onoe Kikunosuke V (son of famous Kabuki actor Onoe Kikugorō VII))

Nakamura Kichiemon I (初代中村吉右衛門, Shodai Nakamura Kichiemon; March 24, 1886 – September 8, 1954) was a Japanese actor and kabuki performer. In 1945, he became the senior living kabuki actor in Japan.

== Lineage ==
Born into a renowned Kabuki acting family, Kichiemon I comes from a long line of Kabuki actors with roots in the Kamigata region (present-day Kansai region) but who became most popular in Edo (present-day Tokyo).

His grandfather, Nakamura Karoku I (初代 中村歌六) was a legendary onnagata actor who specialized in keisei (i.e., high-class courtesan) roles and who was the first actor to bear the prestigious name Nakamura Karoku (中村歌六).

His father, Nakamura Karoku III (三代目 中村歌六) was a renowned Kaneru yakusha whose specialty was jidaimono plays (i.e. historical plays).

His uncle, Nakamura Karoku II (二代目 中村歌六), was an onnagata actor like Kichiemon I's grandfather (Karoku I), but he did not achieve the same level of fame as his father (Karoku I), brother (Karoku III), or nephews (Kichiemon I, Tokizō III and Kanzaburō XVII).

Kichiemon I was the eldest of three sons of Karoku III and like Kichiemon I, his two younger brothers were also legendary actors of the Kabuki theater during the Showa era: his middle brother, Nakamura Tokizō III (三代目 中村時蔵) was a legendary onnagata actor who was considered one of the greatest onnagata actors of the 20th century and who was the founder of the Yorozuya house (currently headed by Nakamura Manju I (formerly Nakamura Tokizō V), grandson of Tokizō III) and his younger brother Nakamura Kanzaburō XVII (十七代目 中村勘三郎) was a legendary Kaneru yakusha responsible for resurrecting many forgotten traditions of Kabuki theater and for being a renowned Kabuki dancer, being considered a of the greatest Kabuki dancers of the 20th century.

== Biography ==
Kichiemon construed his career in terms of "lifelong study" (gei) of that which cannot be seen in an actor's performance.

Nakamura Kichiemon is a formal kabuki stage name. The actor first appeared using the name in 1897; and he continued to use this name until his death.

He was the maternal grandfather of Nakamura Kichiemon II. In the conservative Kabuki world, stage names are passed from father to son in formal system which converts the kabuki stage name into a mark of accomplishment. In choosing to be known by the same stage name as his grandfather, the living kabuki performer honors his family relationships and tradition.

In a long career, he acted in many kabuki plays, including the role of Matsuō-maru in the July 1951 production of Sugawara Denju Tenarai Kagami.

== Selected works ==
In a statistical overview derived from writings by and about Nakamura Kichiemon I, OCLC/WorldCat encompasses roughly 10+ works in 20+ publications in 2 languages and 80+ library holdings.

- 1946 — "Kabuki geki no susumu beki michi" ("The way kabuki drama must advance"). Tögeki, Tokyo Gekijö program. May 7, 1946
- 1951 — Diary of Kichiemon (吉右衞門自傳, Kichiemon jiden). OCLC 33707206
- 1956 — Kichiemon Diary (吉右衛門日記, Kichiemon nikki) OCLC 033708328

== Honors ==
- Japan Art Academy
- Order of Culture, 1951

== Gallery ==
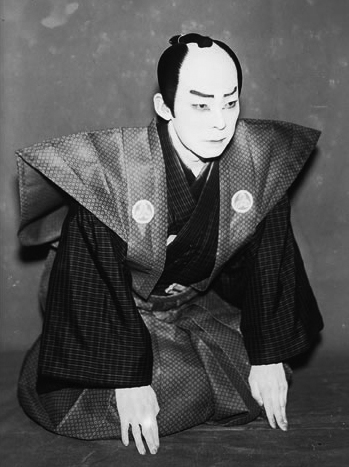
Nakamura Kichiemon I Takebe Genzō, in Sugawara Denju Tenarai Kagami, March 1943

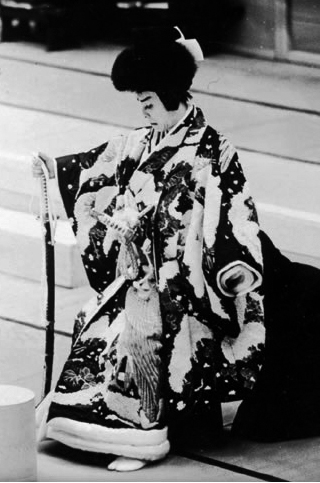
Nakamura Kichiemon I as Matsuō-maru, in Sugawara Denju Tenarai Kagami, July 1951

== See also ==
- List of people on stamps of Japan
- Shūmei
