= Kunisada Chūji (1958 film) =

Kunisada Chūji 国定忠治
- Film poster
- Directed by: Shigehiro Ozawa
- Produced by: Toei Company
- Release date: August 27, 1958 (Japan)
- Running time: 95 minutes
- Country: Japan
- Language: Japanese

Kunisada Chūji (Japanese: 国定忠治) is a 1958 color Japanese film directed by Shigehiro Ozawa.

== Cast ==
- Chiezo Kataoka as Kunisada Chūji
- Ryūnosuke Tsukigata as Genji
- Kōtarō Satomi as Asataro
- Shunji Sakai as Denkichi

== See also ==
- Kunisada Chūji (国定 忠治) (1810–1851)
  - Kunisada Chūji (1954 film)
  - The Gambling Samurai (1960 film)
