= Daisuke Itō (film director) =

Japanese director and screenwriter (1898–1981)

Daisuke Itō 伊藤大輔
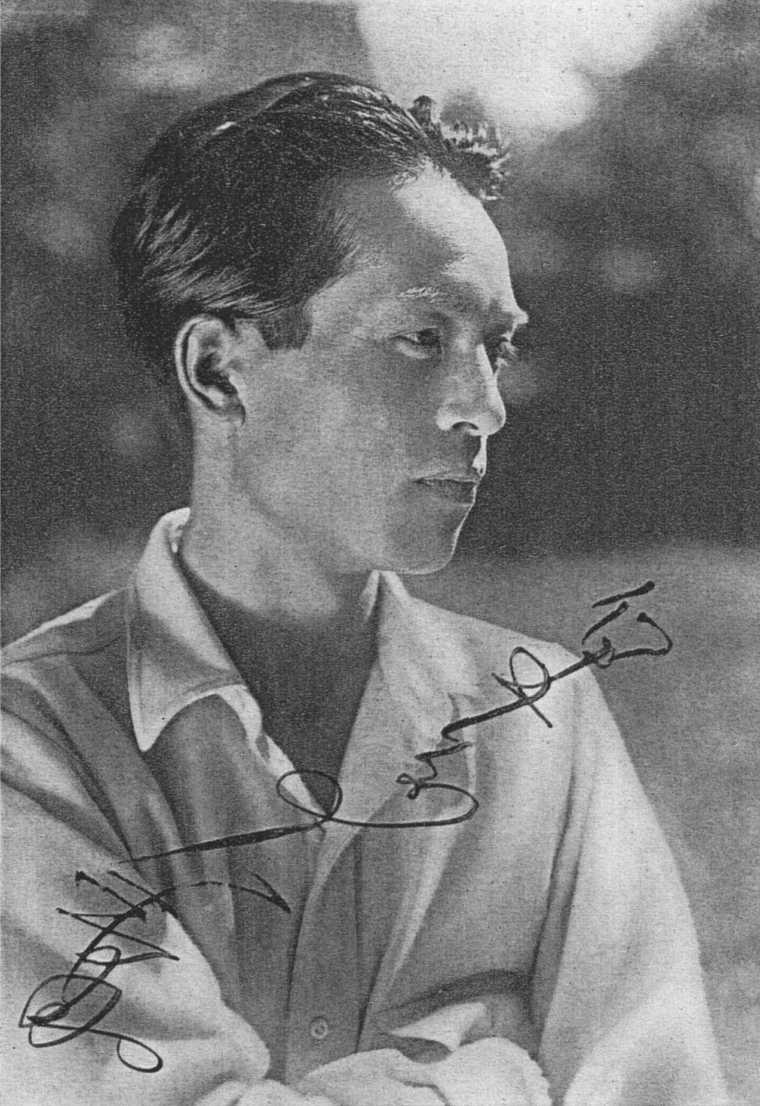
- Daisuke Itō in 1928
- Born: 12 October 1898; Uwajima, Ehime
- Died: 19 July 1981 (aged 82); Kyoto Prefecture
- Occupations: Film director, screenwriter

Daisuke Itō (伊藤 大輔, Itō Daisuke; 12 October 1898 – 19 July 1981) was a Japanese film director and screenwriter who played a central role in the development of the modern jidaigeki and samurai cinema.

== Career ==
Born in Ehime Prefecture, Itō joined the actors school at Shochiku in 1920, but soon began writing screenplays under the recommendation of Kaoru Osanai. He made his directorial debut in 1924 at Teikoku Kinema with Shuchū nikki. After trying to start his own production company, he settled at Nikkatsu . He established his name in 1927 with the three-part A Diary of Chuji's Travels, which is considered one of the masterpieces of jidaigeki.

Especially in the silent era, he was known for a very mobile camera style that earned him the nickname "Idō daisuki" (Loves Motion), which is a pun on his name. The heroes of his films, such as Tange Sazen and Kunisada Chūji, were often disaffected, nihilistic loners, and thus Itō's early films were sometimes considered tendency films. He was criticized, however, for being more of a stylist than a thematically committed filmmaker. While being a director who was less successful after the coming of sound, Itō worked with many great jidaigeki stars, especially Denjirō Ōkōchi, Yorozuya Kinnosuke, Ichikawa Raizō VIII, and Tsumasaburō Bandō at studios such as Nikkatsu and Daiei, in a career that spanned nearly half a century.

In 1991, a partial print of A Diary of Chuji's Travels, long considered a lost film, was discovered and screened for the public.

== Selected filmography ==
- Chōkon (長恨) (1926)
- A Diary of Chuji's Travels (忠次旅日記) (1927)
- Shinpan Ōoka seidan (新版大岡政談) (1928)
- Chikemuri Takadanobaba (血煙高田馬場) (1928)
- Zanjin zanbaken (斬人斬馬剣) (1928)
- Jirokichi the Rat (御誂治郎吉格子) (1931)
- Ōshō (王将) (1948)
- Five Men of Edo (大江戸五人男) (1951)
- Shunkin monogatari (春琴物語) (1954)
- Ōshō ichidai (王将-代) (1955) - First remake of Itō's Ōshō
- The Gay Masquerade (弁天小僧) (1958)
- Scar Yosaburo (切られ与三郎) (1960)
- Hatamoto Gurentai (旗本愚連隊) (1960) (screenplay)
- Hangyakuji (反逆児) (1961)
- The King (王将) (1962) - Second remake of Itō's Ōshō
- Bakumatsu (幕末) (1970)
