= Dangibon =

The dangibon (談義本) was a pre-modern Japanese literary genre. Texts were written in a humorous, satirical sermon-style with the purpose of educating the masses. It is type of gesaku.

== Developments ==
Masuho Zankō (増穂残口) and Niwa Chozan are credited with establishing the early foundations upon which the genre rests. In 1715, Masuho wrote Endō Tukugan (艶道通鑑), and in 1727 Issai wrote Inaka Sōji (田舎荘子). These two texts are early forerunners of the genre. However, the genre is not fully realized until several decades later. In 1752, Jōkanbō Kōa (静観房好阿) wrote Imayō Heta Dangi (当世下手談義; "A Clumsy Sermon in the Modern Manner"), which is identified as the first true example of the dangibon genre.

The genre existed between the 1752 c. 1800, reaching "the height of their popularity in the 1750s." It gradually evolved into the kokkeibon genre at the start of the 19th century.

== Major works ==
- Endō Tukugan (艶道通鑑) (1715)
- Inaka Sōji (田舎荘子) (1727)
- Imayō Heta Dangi (当世下手談義; "A Clumsy Sermon in the Modern Manner") (1752)
- Kyōkunzō Nagamochi (教訓雑長持) (1752)
- Sentō Shinwa (銭湯新話) (1754)
- Nenashigusa (根南志具佐) (1763)
- Fūryū Shidōken-den (風流志道軒伝; "The Biography of the Jolly Shidōken") (1763)
- Wasō Byōe (和荘兵衛) (1774)

== See also ==
- Hiraga Gennai, one of the major dangibon authors.
