= Tōkaidōchū Hizakurige =

1802–1822 novel by Jippensha Ikku

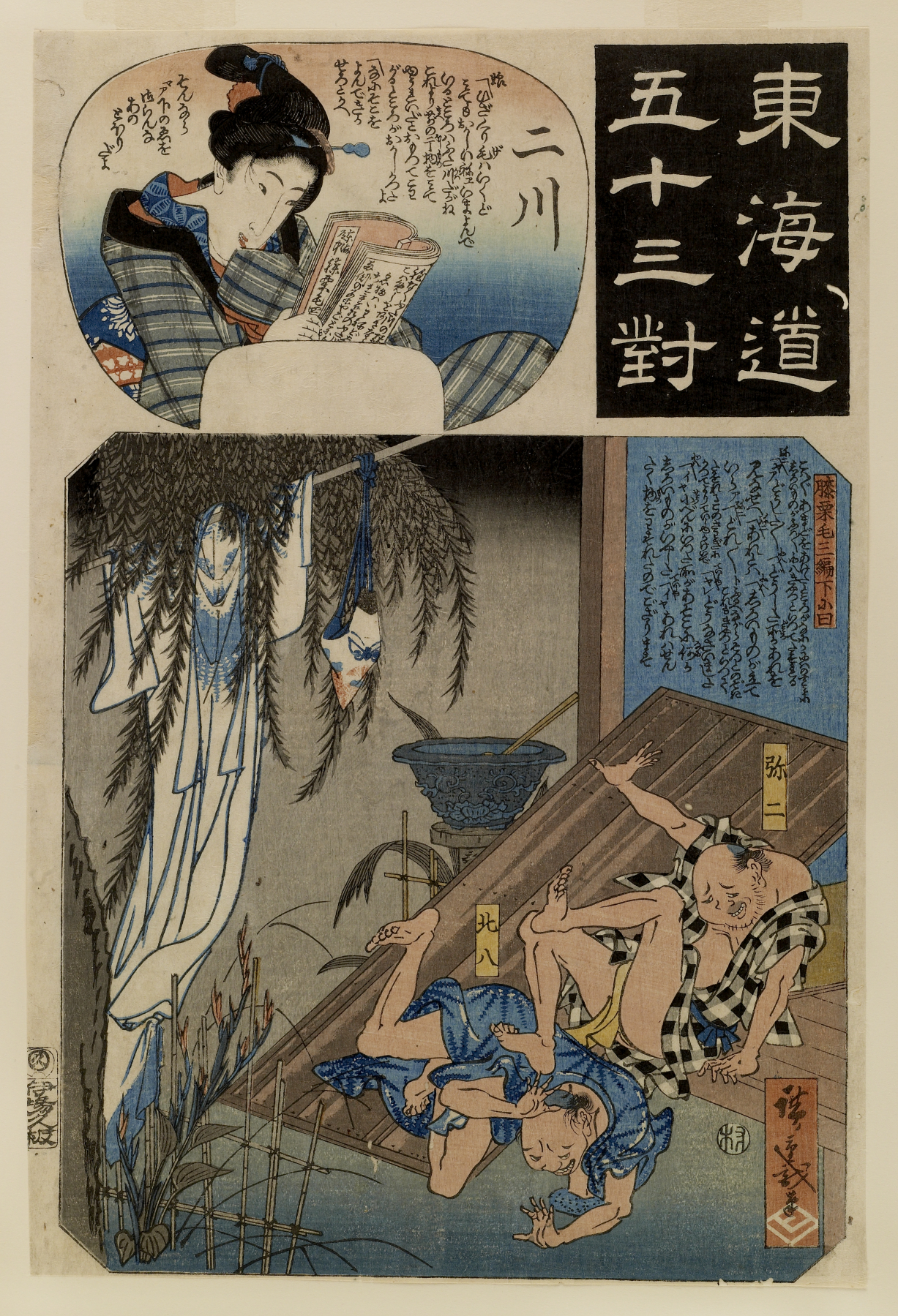
Tokaido gojusan tsui, Futakawa by Hiroshige. Two men frightened by a ghost fall over one another and then laugh hysterically when they realize they are fleeing a kimono drying in the wind. (This print illustrates a scene from "Footing It along the Tokaido Road" (or "Shank's Mare")

Tōkaidōchū Hizakurige (東海道中膝栗毛; Japanese pronunciation: [toː.kai.doꜜː.tɕɯː | çi.(d)za.kɯꜜ.ɾʲi.ɡe, -ɾʲi.ŋe]), abbreviated as Hizakurige ([çi.(d)za.kɯꜜ.ɾʲi.ɡe, -ɾʲi.ŋe]) and known in translation as Shank's Mare, is a comic picaresque novel (kokkeibon) written by Jippensha Ikku (十返舎一九, 1765–1831) about the misadventures of two travelers on the Tōkaidō, the main road between Kyoto and Edo during the Edo period. The book was published in twelve parts between 1802 and 1822.

The two main characters are Yajirobē (彌次郎兵衛) and Kitahachi (喜多八), a pair of pilgrims traveling from Edo to Kyoto to the Ise Grand Shrine. Their names are often shortened to just Yaji and Kita.

As well as being a comic work, Hizakurige also serves as a guidebook, providing information and anecdotes about various regions along the Tōkaidō. The book was published during a tourism boom in the Edo Period and is one of many guidebooks that was written to meet public appetite for sight-seeing.

It details famous landmarks at each of the 53 stations along the road, where the characters, frequently find themselves in comedic situations. They travel from station to station, predominantly interested in food, sake, and women. As Edo men, they view the world through an Edo lens, deeming themselves more cultured than the countrymen they meet.

A second book was also written, called Zoku Hizakurige, which includes material on the Kiso Valley, Konpira, and Miyajima.

Some of the scenes from Hizakurige have been illustrated by famous ukiyo-e artists, such as Hiroshige in his One Hundred Views of Edo.

== Yaji and Kita's travels ==
The pair's journey is illustrated by crude jokes and puns. They make fun of a daimyō procession, cheat shopkeepers out of money, and get cheated themselves. At one inn, they end up humiliated as they do not know how to use the bathtub; burning themselves rather than asking for help.

In Ueno, one of them pretends to be Ikku, the book's author, before he is found to be an imposter. Also in Ueno, the pair burn themselves after trying to eat some hot stones that they have been served by an innkeeper, not realising that the hot stones are for drying out the konjac to improve the flavor.

Yaji and Kita often try to sneak into bed with women at various inns along the road.

== Film versions ==
- Yaji and Kita: Yasuda's Rescue (1927)
- Yaji and Kita: The Battle of Toba Fushimi (1928)
- Travel Chronicles of Yaji and Kita (1956)
- Yaji and Kita: The Midnight Pilgrims (2005)
- Three for the Road (2007)

== Bibliography ==
- Jippensha Ikku, Hizakurige or Shanks' Mare, trans. Thomas Satchell (Charles E. Tuttle Company, Inc., 1960). ASIN: B0007J7ITK.
- Jippensha Ikku, Travels on the Eastern Seaboard (Tōkaidōchū Hizakurige), in Haruo Shirane, ed., Early Modern Japanese Literature: An Anthology, 1600–1900 (Columbia University Press, 2002), pp. 732–747. ISBN 0-231-14415-6.
