= List of people on the postage stamps of Japan =

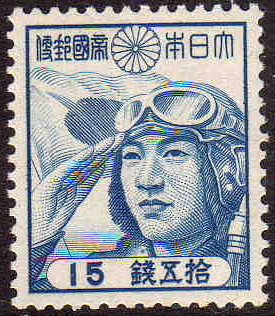
Saluting aviator on 15 sen stamp from 1942

The Japanese Empire issued its first postage stamps in April 1871. In 1896 the first persons to be depicted on a stamp were Prince Kitashirakawa Yoshihisa (1847–1895) and Prince Arisugawa Taruhito (1835–1895) in honor of their role in the First Sino-Japanese War that ended one year earlier. The first woman and third person depicted on a Japanese postage stamp was in 1908 and 1914 Empress Jingū, a legendary Japanese empress who ruled following her husband's death in 200 AD. She was in 1881 already the first woman depicted on a Japanese bank note. However no actual picture of her exists. Instead an artistical representation by Edoardo Chiossone was used for the bank note, modelled after a female employee of the Government Printing Bureau which lead to a western appearance. For the postage stamps of 1908 and 1914 the same image was used. However the printing plates were destroyed in the 1923 Great Kantō earthquake and a revised design by Yoshida Toyo was used for stamps issued in 1924 with a more Asian appearance. A definitive series in 1942 reflected Japan's entry into World War II, with designs including war workers and saluting aviators.

After World War II the first person depicted on a stamp was in 1946 as part of a definitive series Baron Maejima Hisoka (1835–1919), the founder of the Japanese postal service. From 1949 to 1952 a series of eighteen "Personalities of the Cultural History" was issued. In 2006 a series of 20 stamps of Japanese movies was issued depicting famous movie characters.

== List ==
This following table lists people who have been featured on Japanese postage stamps before 2007 in alphabetic order of their last name. The list can also be sorted by year.

Name	Year	Profession / Notability	Stamp(s)
Akihito (*1933)	1959	125th Emperor of Japan, reigning from 1989 to 2019. The stamps were issued on April 10, the day of his marriage with Michiko Shōda.	
Akutagawa Ryunosuke (1892 – 1927)	1999	Writer; Japan's premier literary award, the Akutagawa Prize, is named after him	
Ando Hiroshige (1797 – 1858)	1997	Painter (ukiyo-e artist)	
Arashi Kanjūrō (1903 – 1980)	2000	Actor	
Arisugawa Taruhito (1835 – 1895)	1896	Royal Family; career officer in the Imperial Japanese Army	
Atsumi Kiyoshi (1928 – 1996)	2000	Actor famous for his character in the series Otoko wa Tsurai yo	
Atsumi Kiyoshi (1928 – 1996)	2006	Actor famous for his character in the series Otoko wa Tsurai yo	
Bandō Tsumasaburō (1901 – 1953)	1999	Actor	
Beethoven, Ludwig van (1770 – 1827)	2005	German composer	
Buchanan, James (1791 – 1868)	1960	American President	
Chishū Ryū (1904 – 1993)	2006	Actor appearing in over 160 films and about 70 television productions	
Clark, William S. (1826 – 1886)	2001	Professor	
Chiossone, Edoardo (1833 – 1898)	1994	Italian engraver and painter who designed the first Japanese bank notes	
Daidouzan	1979	Sumo Wrestler	
Doi Takao (*1954)	2000	Astronaut, engineer and veteran of two NASA Space Shuttle missions	
Enomoto Kenichi (1904 – 1970)	2000	Actor, singing comedian known by his stage name Enoken	
Fujiwara Yoshie (1898 – 1976)	1998	Opera singer who established the Fujiwara Opera	
Fujiwara no Kamatari (614 – 669)	1939 (Note: As painting from Fujiwara no Takanobu (1142-1205))	Founder of the Fujiwara clan	
Fujiwara no Kamatari (614 – 669)	1945	Founder of the Fujiwara clan	
Fujiwara no Teika (1162 – 1241)	2005	Waka poet	
Fukada Kyūya (1903 – 1971)	2003	Mountaineer and writer	
Fukuzawa Yukichi (1835 – 1901)	1950	Teacher, translator, entrepreneur and political theorist; founder of Keio University, a newspaper and the Institute for Study of Infectious Diseases; He also appears on the 10,000 yen bank note	
Fukuzawa Yukichi (1835 – 1901)	1958	Teacher, translator, entrepreneur and political theorist; founder of Keio University, a newspaper and the Institute for Study of Infectious Diseases; He also appears on the 10,000 yen bank note	
Furuhashi Hironoshin (1928 – 2009)	2000	Swimmer	
Futabayama Sadaji (1912 – 1968)	2000	Sumo Wrestler	
Gotokudaiji no Sadaijin	2006		
Hamada Mitsuo	2006	Actor	
Hanawa Hokinoichi (1746 – 1821)	1996	Japanologist	
Hanaoka Seishū (1760 – 1835)	2000	Physician	
Hanaoka Seishū (1760 – 1835)	2004	Physician	
Hara Setsuko (1920 – 2015)	2006	Actress	
Hayami Gyoshu (1894 – 1935)	1994	Painter	
Hayashi Fumiko (1903 – 1951)	2000	Novelist	
Higuchi Ichiyō (1872 – 1896)	1951	Author; Higuchi Ichiyō was the pen name of Natsu Higuchi, also known as Natsuko Higuchi. Specializing in short stories, she was one of the first important writers to appear in the Meiji period.	
Higuchi Ichiyō (1872 – 1896)	1981	Author; Higuchi Ichiyō was the pen name of Natsu Higuchi, also known as Natsuko Higuchi. Specializing in short stories, she was one of the first important writers to appear in the Meiji period.	
Hiraga Gennai (1729 – 1780)	2004	Inventor	
Hirata Mitsuru	2006	Actor	
Hishida Shunsō (1874 – 1911)	1951	Painter from the Meiji period. Hishida Shunsō was the pseudonym of Hishida Miyoji. He played a role in the Meiji era innovation of Nihonga ("Japanese-style paintings").	
Hitomi Kinue (1907 – 1931)	2000	Athlete; Japanese track and field athlete and first Japanese woman to win an Olympic medal	
Hornfischer, Kurt (1910 – 1958)	1952	German heavyweight wrestler	
Hozumi Nobushige (1855 – 1926)	1999	Statesman, legal expert	
Ichikawa Danjūrō IX (1838 – 1903)	1950	Kabuki actor, one of the most successful and famous of the Meiji period	
Ichikawa Danjūrō XI	1991	Kabuki actor	
Ichikawa Ebizo (1741 – 1806)	1956	Kabuki actor	
Ichikawa Ebizo (1741 – 1806)	2000	Kabuki actor	
Ichikawa Komazo III	1988	Kabuki actor	
Ichikawa Raizo (1931 – 1969)	2006	Actor	
Ii Naosuke (1815 – 1860)	1958	Daimyō of Hikone (1850–1860) and Tairō of the Tokugawa shogunate	
Ino Tadataka (1745 – 1818)	1995	Surveyor, cartographer	
Iseno Taifu	2006		
Ishihara Yujiro (1934 – 1987)	1997	Actor, singer	
Ishikawa Goemon (1558 – 1594)	1992	Ninja warrior	
Iwai Hanshiro	1984		
Iwai Kumejiro	1988		
Iwamigata	1979		
Iwasaki Yataro (1835 – 1885)	1986	Founder of Mitsubishi Company Group	
Izumo no Okuni (ca. 1578 – 1613)	1989	Founder of Kabuki	
Izumo no Okuni (ca. 1578 – 1613)	2003	Founder of Kabuki	
Jingū	1908	Empress	
Jingū	1914	Empress	
Jingū	1924	Empress	
Jinmaku (1829 – 1903)	1978		
Jitukawa Nobuwaka II	1992		
Kamiya Jihee	1991		
Kanaguri Shizo (1891 – 1983)	1999	Marathon runner	
Kaneko Misuzu (1903 – 1930)	2003	Poet	
Kanō Hōgai (1828 – 1888)	1951	Painter of the Kanō school	
Kataoka Nizaemon XIII	1992		
Katsushika Hokusai (ca. 1760 – 1849)	1999	Painter	
Katsura Beicho III	1999	Rakugo Teller	
Katsura Bunraku VIII	1999	Rakugo Teller	
Kawabata Yasunari (1899 – 1972)	1999	Writer	
Kawabata Yasunari (1899 – 1972)	2000	Writer	
Kawakami Otojiro (1864 – 1911)	1999	Actor	
Kawakami Sadayakko (1871 – 1946)	1999	Actress, Business woman	
Kazama Morio (*1949)	2006	Actor	
Keller, Helen (1880 – 1968)	2000	Deafblind American author	
Kimura Hisashi (1870 – 1943)	1952	Astronomer	
Ki no Tsurayuki (872 – 945)	1993	Author	
Kishi Keiko (*1932)	2000	Actress	
Kishi Keiko (*1932)	2006	Actress	
Kitano Takeshi (*1947)	2006	Film director, comedian	
Kitashirakawa Yoshihisa (1847 – 1895)	1896	Prince	
Kitasato Shibasaburō (1853 – 1931)	2003	Physician and bacteriologist	
Kobayashi Akira (*1938)	2006	Actor, singer	
Kobayashi Takiji (1903 – 1933)	2000	Author	
Kōda Rohan (1867 – 1947)	1997	Author	
Koga Masao (1904 – 1978)	2004	Composer	
Kokontei Shincho V	1999	Rakugo Teller	
Komura Jutaro (1855 – 1911)	1999	Statesman, diplomat	
Kondo Makoto	1986	Educator	
Koizumi Yakumo (1850 – 1904)	2004	Author	
Kumagai Naozane (1141 – 1208)	1992	Bushi	
Kume Danjo	1991		
Kunisada Chuji (1810 – 1851)	1999		
Kuroki Hitomi (*1960)	2006	Actress	
Kurosawa Akira (1910 – 1998)	2000	Film Director	
Kyō Machiko (1924 – 2019)	2006	Actress	
Maejima Hisoka (1835 – 1919)	1927	Statesman, politician, businessman, founder of the Japanese postal service	
Maejima Hisoka (1835 – 1919)	1946	Statesman, politician, businessman, founder of the Japanese postal service	
Maejima Hisoka (1835 – 1919)	1946	Statesman, politician, businessman, founder of the Japanese postal service	
Maejima Hisoka (1835 – 1919)	1947	Statesman, politician, businessman, founder of the Japanese postal service	
Maejima Hisoka (1835 – 1919)	1951	Statesman, politician, businessman, founder of the Japanese postal service	
Maejima Hisoka (1835 – 1919)	1952	Statesman, politician, businessman, founder of the Japanese postal service	
Maejima Hisoka (1835 – 1919)	1961	Statesman, politician, businessman, founder of the Japanese postal service	
Maejima Hisoka (1835 – 1919)	1968	Statesman, politician, businessman, founder of the Japanese postal service	
Maejima Hisoka (1835 – 1919)	1985	Statesman, politician, businessman, founder of the Japanese postal service	
Maejima Hisoka (1835 – 1919)	1994	Statesman, politician, businessman, founder of the Japanese postal service	
Masako, Crown Princess of Japan (*1963)	1993	Princess	
Masako, Crown Princess of Japan (*1963)	2000	Princess	
Masaoka Shiki (1867 – 1902)	1951	Author, poet and literary critic in Meiji period Japan; Masaoka Shiki is the pen-name of Masaoka Noboru. Shiki is considered of major importance in the development of modern haiku poetry.	
Masaoka Shiki (1867 – 1902)	2001	Author, poet and literary critic in Meiji period Japan; Masaoka Shiki is the pen-name of Masaoka Noboru. Shiki is considered of major importance in the development of modern haiku poetry.	
Masaoka Shiki (1867 – 1902)	2002	Author, poet and literary critic in Meiji period Japan; Masaoka Shiki is the pen-name of Masaoka Noboru. Shiki is considered of major importance in the development of modern haiku poetry.	
Yūsaku Matsuda (1949 – 1989)	2006	Actor	
Matsui Sumako (1886 – 1919)	1999	Actress	
Matsumoto Koshiro VII (1870 – 1949)	1991	Kabuki actor	
Matsuo Bashō (1644 – 1694)	1987	Poet	
Matsuo Bashō (1644 – 1694)	1989	Poet	
Matsuo Bashō (1644 – 1694)	2002	Poet	
Matsuzaka Keiko (*1952)	2006	Actress	
Michiko Shōda (*1934)	1959	Empress. The stamps were issued on April 10, the day of her marriage with Akihito	
Mifune Toshirō (1920 – 1997)	2000	Actor	
Mifune Toshirō (1920 – 1997)	2006	Actor	
Minamoto no Yoritomo (1147 – 1199)	1968	First Shōgun of Kamakura Shogunate	
Minamoto no Yoritomo (1147 – 1199)	1982	First Shōgun of Kamakura Shogunate	
Mishima Yahiko	1999	Athlete	
Misora Hibari (1937 – 1989)	1997	Singer	
Misora Hibari (1937 – 1989)	2000	Singer	
Miyagi Michio (1894 – 1956)	1994	Composer, musician	
Miyazawa Kenji (1896 – 1933)	1996	Author, poet	
Miyazawa Rie (*1973)	2006	Actress	
Mori Masayuki	2006	Actor	
Mori Ōgai (1862 – 1922)	1951	Physician, translator, novelist, poet; The Wild Geese is considered his major work.	
Mori Ōgai (1862 – 1922)	1990	Physician, translator, novelist, poet; The Wild Geese is considered his major work.	
Motoori Norinaga (1730 – 1801)	2001	Scholar of Kokugaku	
Nagaoka Hantaro (1865 – 1950)	2000	Physicist	
Nagaoka Hantaro (1865 – 1950)	2003	Physicist	
Nagashima Shigeo (*1936)	2000	Baseball player	
Nakamura Baigyoku III	1991	Kabuki actor	
Nakamura Ganjiro II	1991	Kabuki actor	
Nakamura Hakuo I	1992	Kabuki actor	
Nakamura Kanzaburō XVII	1992	Kabuki actor	
Nakamura Kichiemon I (1886 – 1954)	1992	Kabuki actor	
Nakamura Teijo	2000	Poet	
Nakamura Utaemon VI (1917 – 2001)	1991	Kabuki actor	
Nakamura Kanzaburo XVII	1992	Kabuki actor	
Nakatsuhime	1988		
Nakaya Ukichiro	2000	Physicist	
Naruhito, Crown Prince of Japan (*1960)	1993	Prince	
Naruhito, Crown Prince of Japan (*1960)	2000	Prince	
Naruse Jinzo	2000	Educator	
Natsume Masako (1957 – 1985)	2006	Actress	
Natsume Sōseki (1867 – 1916)	1950	Novelist who is best known for his novels Kokoro, Botchan, I Am a Cat and his unfinished work Light and Darkness.	
Natsume Sōseki (1867 – 1916)	1999	Novelist who is best known for his novels Kokoro, Botchan, I Am a Cat and his unfinished work Light and Darkness.	
Niijima Jo (1843 – 1890)	1950	Educator and Christian missionary of the Meiji era; founder of Doshisha University and Doshisha Women's College of Liberal Arts; husband of Niijima Yae	
Nishi Amane (1829 – 1897)	1952	Philosopher	
Nishida Kitaro (1870 – 1945)	1995	Philosopher	
Nishina Yoshio (1890 – 1951)	1990	Physicist	
Nitobe Inazo (1862 – 1933)	1952	Agricultural Economist, Author, Educator, Diplomat, Politician	
Nogi Maresuke (1849 – 1912)	1937	General	
Nogi Maresuke (1849 – 1912)	1938	General	
Nogi Maresuke (1849 – 1912)	1942	General	
Nogi Maresuke (1849 – 1912)	1944	General	
Nogi Maresuke (1849 – 1912)	1945	General	
Noguchi Hideyo (1876 – 1928)	1949	Doctor, bacteriologist	
Noguchi Hideyo (1876 – 1928)	1999	Doctor, bacteriologist	
Noguchi, Isamu (1904 – 1988)	2004	Japanese - American artist, landscape architect	
Nukata no Ookimi	1981		
Oda Mikio (1905 – 1998)	2000	Athlete	
Oe Kenzaburo (*1935)	2000	Author	
Ogiya Yugiri	1991		
Oh Sadaharu (*1940)	2000	Baseball player	
Okakura Tenshin (1862 – 1913)	1952	Scholar	
Okochi Denjiro	2006	Actor	
Onoe Baiko VII	1992	Kabuki actor	
Onoe Bairyoku II	1992	Kabuki actor	
Onoe Kikugoro VI	1991	Kabuki actor	
Onoe Shoroku II (1913 – 1989)	1992	Kabuki actor	
Ono no Komachi (ca. 825 – 900)	2005	Poet	
Ono no Michikaze (894 – 966)	2000	Calligrapher	
Ōshikōchi no Mitsune	2006	Heian administrator and waka poet of the Japanese court	
Otani Oniji	1984	Kabuki actor	
Ōtsuki Fumihiko (1847 – 1928)	2000	Lexicographer, Linguist, Historian	
Ozaki Yukio (1858 – 1954)	1960	Politician	
Ozawa Seiji (1935 – 2024)	2000	Conductor	
Ozu Yasujiro (1903 – 1963)	2003	Film director	
Palusalu, Kristjan (1908 – 1987)	1952	Estonian heavyweight wrestler	
Raiden Tameemon (1767 – 1825)	1978	Sumo Wrestler	
Rikidōzan (1924 – 1963)	2000	Wrestler	
Russell, George	1949	Boy Scout	
Saito Mokichi (1882 – 1953)	2003	Poet	
Saito Musashibo Benkei (1155 – 1189)	1991	Warrior	
Sakai Yoshinori (1945 – 2014)	1996	Athlete, who lit the Olympic Flame, 1964. Former Fuji Television Director	
Sakamoto Ryōma (1836 – 1867)	2000	Leader of the movement to overthrow the Tokugawa bakufu	
Sanada Hiroyuki (*1960)	2006	Actor	
Sano Tsunetami (1822 – 1902)	1939	Statesman, Founder of the Japanese Red Cross Society	
Sanyutei Ensho VI	1999	Rakugo Teller	
Sada Keiji (1926 – 1964)	2000	Actor	
Sato Ichiei	1999	Poet	
Sawamura Eiji (1917 – 1944)	2000	Baseball player	
Seki Takakazu (ca. 1642 – 1708)	1992	Mathematician	
Shiba Ryotaro (1923 – 1996)	2000	Novelist	
Shigemitsu Mamoru (1887 – 1957)	2000	Minister of Foreign Affairs	
Shimamura Hogetsu	1999	Writer	
Shimazaki Toson (1872 – 1943)	1993	Author	
Shinmi Masaoki	1960	Ambassador	
Shirase Nobu (1861 – 1964)	1960	Explorer	
Shirase Nobu (1861 – 1964)	1999	Explorer	
Sho Deikun	1993		
Shoriki Matsutaro (1885 – 1969)	1984	Owner of Yomiuri Media Group, Minister of Science Technology	
Shotoku Taishi (574 – 622)	2000	Prince	
Siebold, Philipp Franz von (1796 – 1866)	1996	German physician	
Sugihara Chiune (1900 – 1986)	2000	Diplomat	
Soma Gyofu	1995	Poet	
Suo no Naishi (– ca. 1110)	2006		
Suzuki Umetaro (1874 – 1943)	1993	Scientist	
Takamine Hideko (1924 – 2010)	2006	Actress	
Takamura Kotaro (1833 – 1956)	2000	Poet and sculptor	
Takehisa Yumeji (1884 – 1934)	1999	Painter	
Takekuma (*1986)	1979	Sumo Wrestler	
Takemoto Gidayu (1651 – 1714)	2001	Gidayu bushi Singer	
Takizawa Bakin (1767 – 1848)	1998	Author	
Tanaka Kinuyo (1909 – 1977)	2000	Actress	
Tanakadate Aikitsu (1856 – 1952)	2002	Geophysicist	
Terada Torahiko (1878-1935)	1952	Physicist, author	
Tezuka Osamu (1928 – 1989)	1997	Manga artist, animator	
Tōgō Heihachirō (1847-1934)	1937	Fleet Admiral	
Tōgō Heihachirō (1847-1934)	1938	Fleet Admiral	
Tōgō Heihachirō (1847-1934)	1942	Fleet Admiral	
Tōgō Heihachirō (1847-1934)	1944	Fleet Admiral	
Tōgō Heihachirō (1847-1934)	1945	Fleet Admiral	
Tomii Masaaki	1999	Jurist	
Tomohiko Takeuchi	1984	Poet	
Tsuboi Sakae (1899 – 1967)	2000	Novelist, poet	
Tsuda Umeko (1864 – 1929)	2000	Educator	
Tsuruta Kōji (1924 – 1987)	2006	Actor	
Tsuruta Yoshiyuki (1903 – 1986)	2000	Swimmer	
Tsubouchi Shoyo (1859-1935)	1950	Author, critic, playwright, translator and professor at Waseda University.	
Uchimura Kanzō (1861-1930)	1951	Author, Christian evangelist and the founder of the Nonchurch Movement of Christianity in the Meiji and Taishō period of Japan. He is one of the most well-known Japanese pre-World War II pacifists.	
Uehara Ken	2000	Actor	
Uemura Shoen (1875 – 1949)	1999	Painter	
Ume Kenjirō (1860-1910)	1952	Legal scholar	
Ume Kenjirō (1860-1910)	1999	Legal scholar	
Watanabe Kazan (1793 – 1841)	1993	Painter	
Yoshijirō Umezu (1882 – 1949)	2000	Chief commander of the Japanese army	
Yakushimaru Hiroko (*1964)	2006	Actress, singer	
Yakusho Kōji (*1956)	2006	Actor	
Yamabe no Akahito	2006	Poet	
Yamamoto Yuzo (1887 – 1974)	2000	Novelist, playwright	
Yanagiya Kosan V	1999	Rakugo Teller	
Yorozuya Kinnosuke (1932 – 1997)	2006	Actor	
Yosano Akiko (1878 – 1942)	1992	Author, poet, social reformer	
Yosano Akiko (1878 – 1942)	1999	Author, poet, social reformer	
Yoshida Shigeru (1878 – 1967)	1996	Prime Minister	
Yoshida Shoin (1830 – 1859)	1959	Scholar	
Yoshikawa Eiji (1892 – 1962)	2000	Novelist	
Yoshinaga Sayuri (*1945)	2006	Actress	
Yoshino Sakuzo (1878 – 1933)	1999	Author, political thinker	
Yoshioka Yayoi (1871 – 1959)	2000	Physician, Women's rights activist	
Yukawa Hideki (1907 – 1981)	1985	Theoretical physicist	
Yukawa Hideki (1907 – 1981)	2000	Theoretical physicist	

== Literature ==
- Michel catalogue Japan, Korea, Mongolei, Georgien, GUS in Asien 2020, Übersee Band 9.2, 42nd edition, ISBN 978-3-95402-310-3, p. 223–677 (German)
