= Kunisada Chūji (1954 film) =

Kunisada Chūji 国定忠治
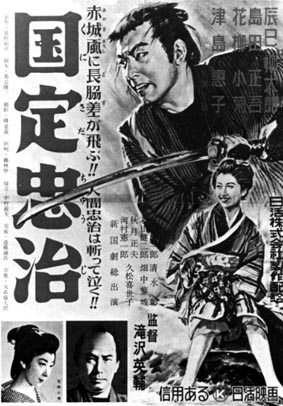
- Japanese movie poster
- Directed by: Eisuke Takizawa
- Produced by: Nikkatsu
- Release date: June 27, 1954 (Japan)
- Country: Japan
- Language: Japanese

Kunisada Chūji (Japanese: 国定忠治) is a 1954 black and white Japanese film directed by Eisuke Takizawa.

== Cast ==
- Ryutaro Tatsumi as Chūji

== See also ==
- Kunisada Chūji (国定 忠治) (1810–1851)
- Kunisada Chuji (1958 film)
- The Gambling Samurai (1960 film)
