= Denjirō Ōkōchi =

Japanese actor (1898–1962)

- 大河内 傳次郎
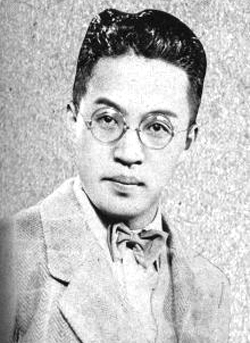
- Denjirō Ōkōchi
- Born: February 5, 1898; Buzen, Fukuoka
- Died: July 18, 1962 (aged 64)
- Other name: Masuo Ōbe
- Occupation: Film actor
- Years active: 1925 – 1961

Denjirō Ōkōchi (大河内 傳次郎, Ōkōchi Denjirō; February 5, 1898 – July 18, 1962) was a Japanese film actor best known for starring roles in jidaigeki directed by leading Japanese filmmakers.

== Early life and family ==
Ōkōchi was born Masuo Ōbe on February 5, 1898, in Ōkōchi, Iwaya (present-day Ōkōchi, Buzen), Fukuoka Prefecture, the fifth son and eighth of nine children of town physician Susumu Ōbe and his wife Aki. Ōkōchi was born to a family of physicians; his father Susumu was the 16th generation of the Ōbe family of physicians, and had served as a personal physician to the daimyo before establishing his own practice following the Meiji Restoration. His paternal grandmother was the daughter of Suematsu Gendō, the domain doctor of Kokura. His mother Aki was the daughter of a Confucian scholar and samurai in the service of Nakatsu Domain.

== Career ==
Ōkōchi entered Shinkokugeki (New National Theatre), training under Sawada Shōjirō (aka Sawasho). Sawada founded this new school of popular theatre in 1917 which had strong cultural impact by the early 1920s. Shinkokugeki was known for jidaigeki the period drama genre, particularly for its realistic sword fights (tate) or swordplay (kengeki).

With this background, Ōkōchi entered the Nikkatsu studio in 1925 and soon came to fame in chanbara (sword-fighting) samurai films – a subgenre of jidaigeki emphasizing tate – playing characters such as Chūji Kunisada and Tange Sazen.

At his peak, he was one of the top jidaigeki stars alongside Tsumasaburō Bandō and Chiezō Kataoka. During World War II, he also appeared in a number of war films. During the second Toho strike in 1946, Okochi led the formation of a new union which opposed the strike. After the end of the strike, the new union became Shintoho.

He was directed by Akira Kurosawa, Ishiro Honda, Daisuke Itō, Sadao Yamanaka, Teinosuke Kinugasa, Hiroshi Inagaki and Masahiro Makino.

== Death ==
Ōkōchi had ceased acting by 1961, dying a year later on July 18, 1962.

== Legacy ==
His house and garden in Arashiyama, Kyoto, called Ōkōchi Sansō, are still preserved and open to the public.

== Selected filmography ==
- Yaji and Kita: The Battle of Toba Fushimi (1927)
- Yaji and Kita: Yasuda's Rescue (1927)
- A Diary of Chuji's Travels (1927) (忠治旅日記 Chūji tabi nikki)
- Oatsurae Jirokichi Koshi (1931)
- The Million Ryo Pot (1935)
- The Giant (1938)
- Hawai Mare oki kaisen (1942)
- Sanshiro Sugata (1943)
- Ano hata o ute (1944)
- Sanshiro Sugata Part II (1945)
- The Men Who Tread on the Tiger's Tail (1945)
- No Regrets for Our Youth (1946)
- Aru yo no Tonosama (1946)
- The Tale of Genji (1951)
- Dedication of the Great Buddha (1952)
- Eagle of the Pacific (Taiheiyô no washi) (1953)
- The Princess Sen (1954)
- Yagyu Secret Scrolls (1957)
- Dai-bosatsu tōge (1957)
- Akō Rōshi (1961)
