= Yaji and Kita: The Battle of Toba Fushimi =

1928 film

- Directed by: Tomiyasu Ikeda
- Starring: Goro Kawabe; Denjirō Ōkōchi
- Cinematography: Junichiro Aoshima
- Production company: Nikkatsu
- Release date: 1928
- Running time: 10 reels
- Country: Japan
- Language: Silent

Yaji and Kita: The Battle of Toba Fushimi (弥次㐂多 伏見鳥羽の巻, Yaji Kita Toba Fushimi no maki) is a 1928 Japanese film directed by Tomiyasu Ikeda. This comedy film showcases the acting talent of Denjirō Ōkōchi and acts as a complementary film to Yaji and Kita: Yasuda's Rescue, which is part of the Yaji and Kita series.

== Versions ==
An 8-minute remnant of the film was released on DVD by Digital Meme with a benshi accompaniment by Midori Sawato. The version in the National Film Center is 23 minutes long.

== Cast ==
- Denjiro Okochi - Kita
- Goro Kawabe - Yaji
- Niizuma Shirō - Sgt. Yamaarashi
