= Jippensha Ikku =

Japanese writer

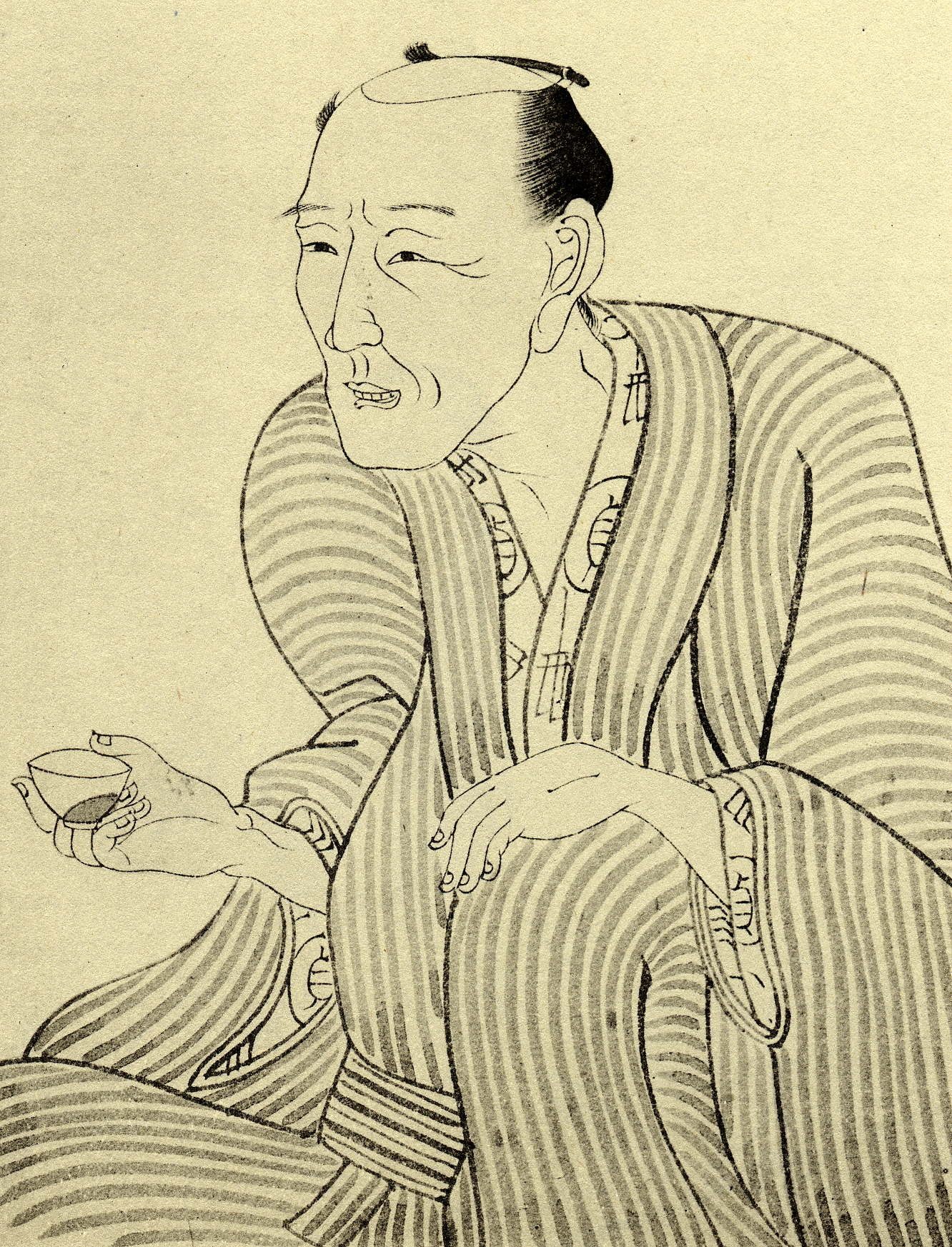
Jippensha Ikku, drawn by Kunisada

Jippensha or Juppensha Ikku (Note: Japanese pronunciation: [dʑip.peꜜɰ̃.ɕa | iꜜk.kɯ, dʑip.peɰ̃.ɕa iꜜk.kɯ, dʑip.peꜜɰ̃.ɕa (|) ik.kɯ, dʑɯp-]) (十返舎 一九; 1765 – September 12, 1831) was the pen name of Shigeta Sadakazu (重田 貞一), a Japanese writer active during the late Edo period of Japan. He was among the most prolific yellow-backed novel (黄表紙, kibyōshi) writers of the late Edo period — between 1795 and 1801 he wrote a minimum of twenty novels a year. He mainly wrote sharebon (洒落本), kokkeibon (滑稽本) and over 360 illustrated stories, (gōkan, 合巻 ). He also helped create kokkeibon as a genre. Ikku was one of the most prolific writers of his time, and shaped the literary history that came after him.

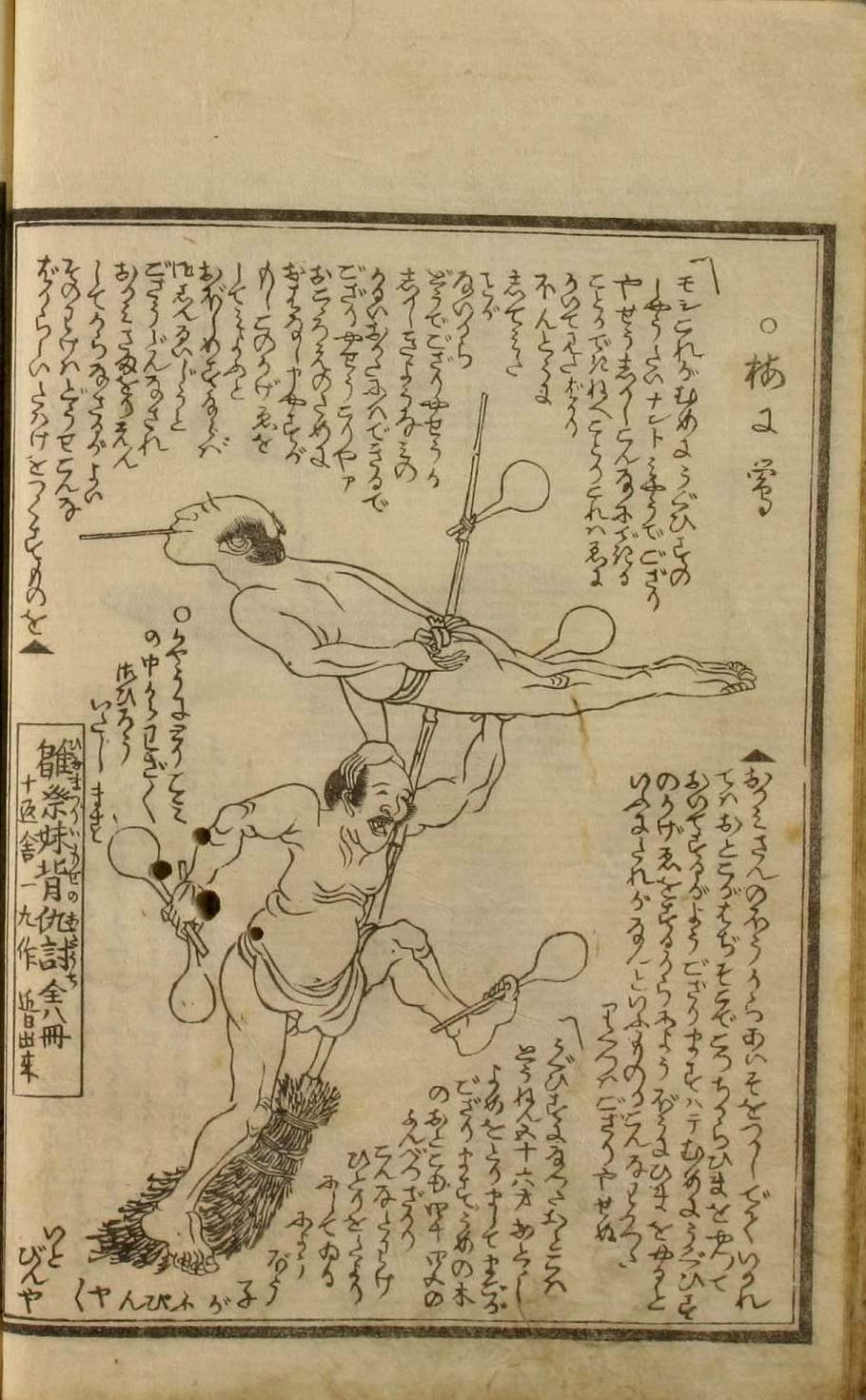
From Otsuriki, a funny book about how to make shadow pictures, 1810

== Life ==
Jippensha Ikku was born in 1765 in the Suruga Province. Ikku's life story is hard to define, because most of what we know about him comes from his own literary works and hearsay from his peers. What we do know about his actual upbringing is that he was born into the high-middle class, his father being a samurai for the magistrate of Fuchu. He lived and worked in Suruga for the daimyo until he was fired. He also worked in Osaka briefly until he was fired again. After this, he decided to follow his two passions in life: incense burning and plays, which took him all around Japan.

He transitioned from plays to literature, specifically sharebon, and began producing them prolifically. Most of his literature was influence by his travels around Japan.

While some insight into Ikku's life can be found in his literature, most of his writing is ironic discussion about himself and his process. Jippensha kesaku no tanehon is a story about Ikku's alter ego, and how its hard for him to come up with good plots in his stories (the direct translation meaning "Jippensha’s sourcebook for frivolous fiction"). These stories help us see into his writing process, and his life; though only to a certain degree, due to his recurring embellishment and irony.

The following anecdotes are told about him, possibly by him: "He accepted poverty with good humor and, having no furniture, hung his bare walls with paintings of the furniture he might have had. On holidays he sacrificed to the gods with pictures of excellent offerings. Being presented with a bathtub in the common interest, he carried it home inverted on his head, and overthrew with ready wit the pedestrians who fell his way. When his publisher came to see him, Jippensha invited him to take a bath. While his invitation was being accepted he decked himself in the publisher's clothes and paid his New Year's Day calls in proper ceremonial costume." Although Ikku is often painted to be welcoming and charismatic, these anecdotes are now widely regarded as apocryphal.

== Death ==
In 1831, Jippensha became paralyzed. On his deathbed, Jippensha is said to have urged his students to place upon his corpse, before his cremation, certain packets which he solemnly entrusted to them. He died on August 7 of that year. At his funeral, prayers having been said, the pyre was lighted, whereupon it turned out that the packets were full of firecrackers, which "exploded merrily." Jippensha had kept his youthful promise that his life would be full of surprises, even after his death. As is common when dealing with stories about Ikku, this tale is most likely not true.

His ashes were buried in Asakusa in Tokyo at the Toyo-in Temple. After the Great Kanto Earthquake in 1923, the grave, as well as the temple, was moved to Kachidoki, Chuo-ku.

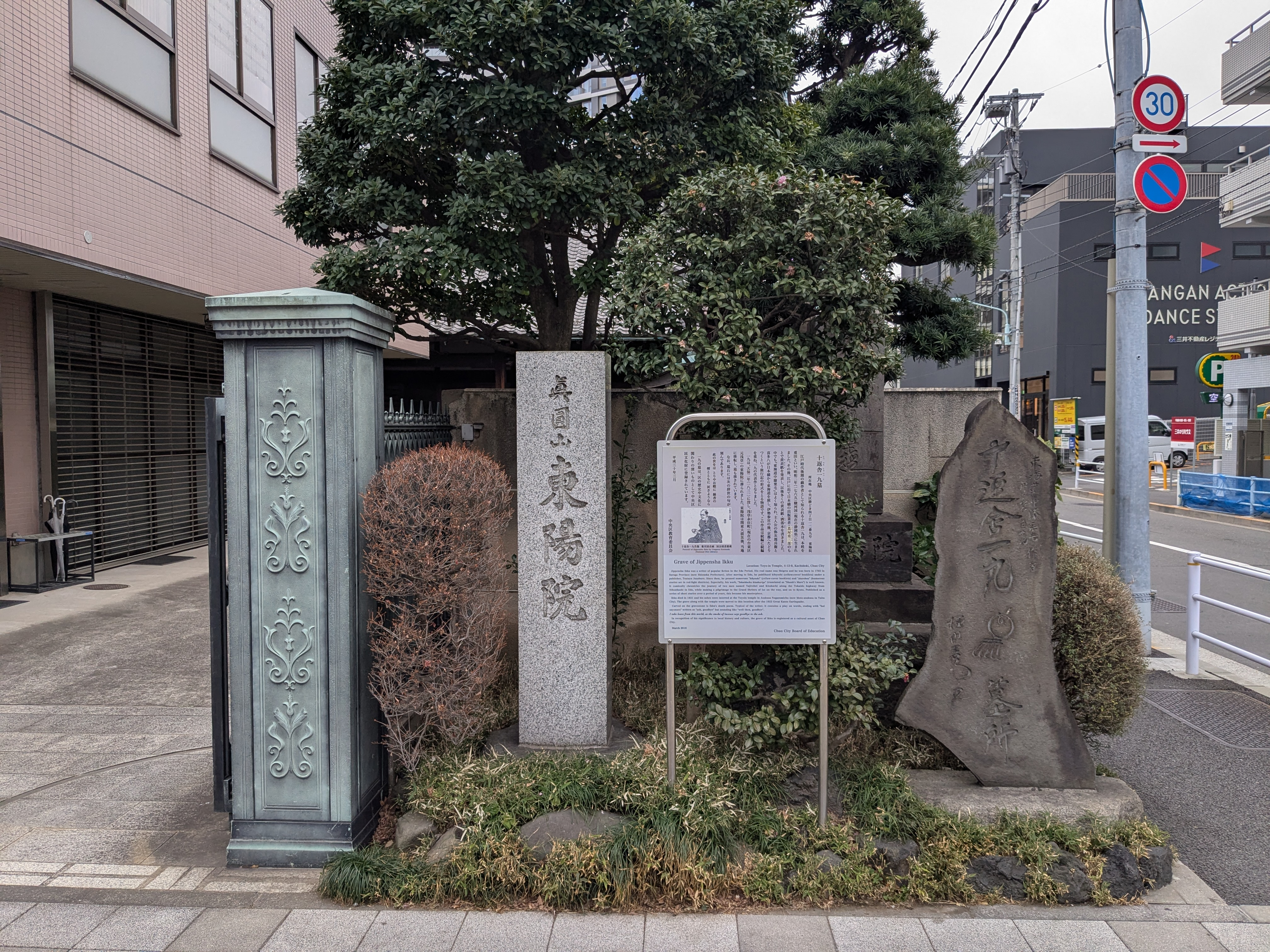
The site at 4-12-9 Kachidoki, Chuo-ku, Tokyo

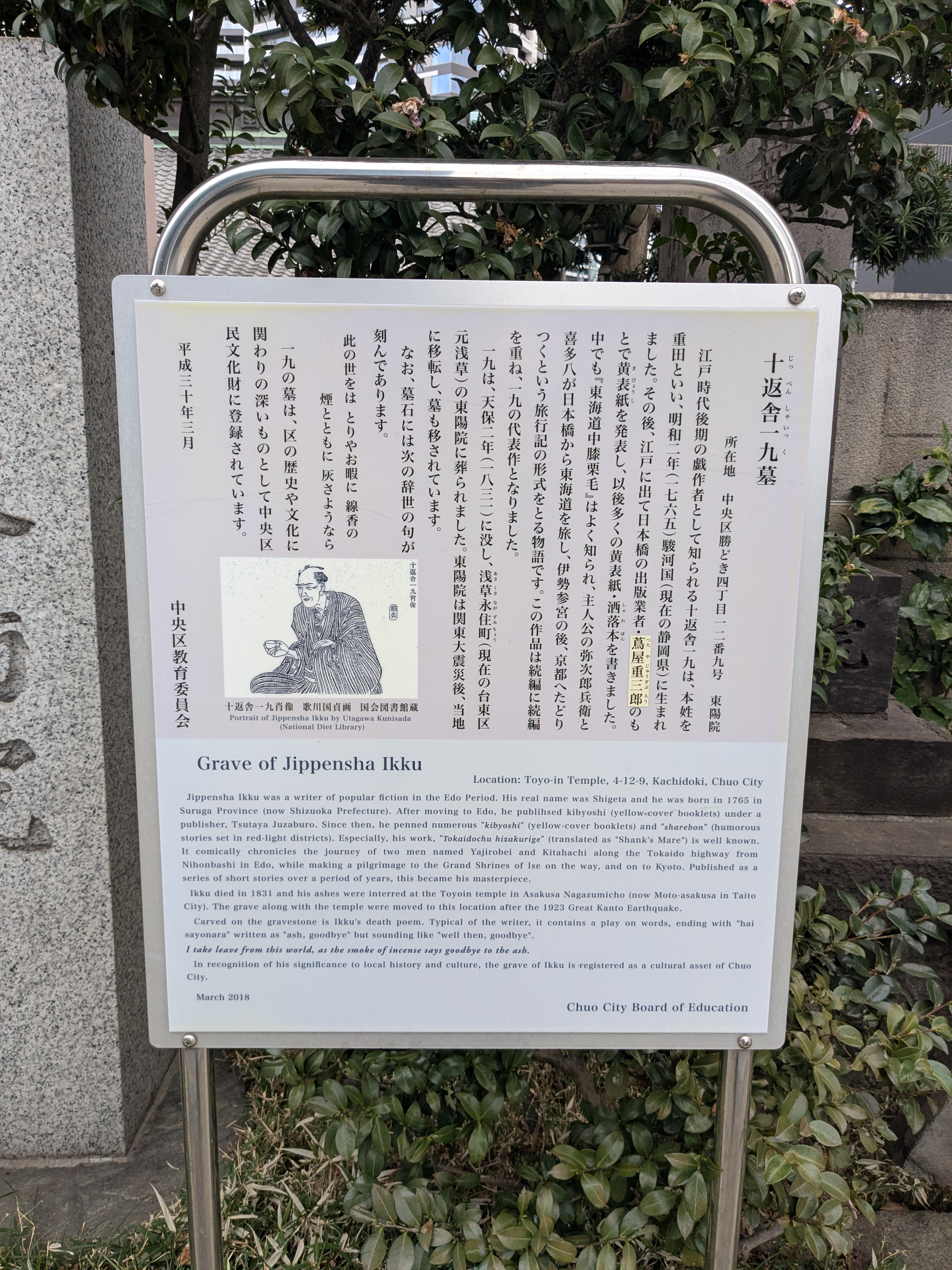
Information board at the site of Jippensha Ikku's grave

== Career ==
Jippensha is commonly connected with comic storytelling, often only thought of as a comic writer. Matthew Shores explains that way of thinking about Ikku was oversimplifying his life. Jippensha was not just connected to comic storytelling, but forged his own fame, by expanding beyond writing and illustrating into storytelling and the social aspect of literature popularity. He was not just the man behind the books, but also the face of them.

Ikku's talent for not only writing was often paired with his artistic ability. Ikku illustrated most of the books that he wrote, making him a goldmine for publishers. He offered them a deal, since they did not have to pay two different people to write and illustrate, they could pay Ikku more than one person would be paid, but less than two. This led to an exceptional amount of his work being published, not only for its quality, but also its lower cost.

Ikku's success as a comic writer was dependent on his knowledge of current events, and his talent for parodying them in his comics. The travel boom in Japan that occurred in the early 1800s inspired him to write his famous "fictional guide books" or Hizakurige. This had to be done gracefully however, due to the strict censorship laws. The technique of Ugachi or "hole poking" had to be done gracefully, or censors would come and arrest you. Ikku was not subtle enough, and was put on a fifty-day house arrest for his inappropriate writing, his publishers were also fined heavily and had their woodblocks destroyed.

His most notable work, Tōkaidōchū Hizakurige, was published in twelve parts between 1802 and 1822. The series of comedic stories follows two men on the road from Edo, and includes the first kokkeibon. W. G. Aston calls it "the most humorous and entertaining book in the Japanese language."

== Comic Storytelling Gatherings ==
Along with being a charismatic narrator of his own stories at public parties, Ikku also participated in a more professional version of this practice: hanashi no kai, or comic storytelling gatherings or contests. At these gatherings, many writers would get together to eat, drink, and perform short skits and plays. His club was called Eiyūdō after the publishing house. The main purpose was to get drunk and have fun, but it also had a secondary benefit of generating ideas for literature. Other comic storytelling groups would publish their best stories in books- many works of Kokkeibon, and the genre itself, may not have been possible without the inspiration of these comic storytelling parties.

== Works ==
- Hizakurige or Shank's Mare: Japan's Great Comic Novel of Travel and Ribaldry by Ikku Jippensha. Translated by Thomas Satchell. Rutland, Vermont: Charles E. Tuttle Company. 1960. ISBN 0-8048-0524-5
- Footing It Along the Tōkaidō (東海道中膝栗毛, tōkaidōchū hizakurige)
- Dōchū hizakurige
- Tokaidochu Hizakurige: Travels on the Eastern Seaboard
