= Gesaku =

Gesaku (戯作) is an alternative style, genre, or school of Japanese literature. In the simplest contemporary sense, any literary work of a playful, mocking, joking, silly or frivolous nature may be called gesaku. Unlike predecessors in the literary field, gesaku writers did not strive for beauty and perfect form in their writings, but rather for popular acceptance. Gesaku writers were dependent on making a living by sale of their books. Like popular magazines and books of the 21st century, their product was aimed at as wide a public as possible. When a book was successful it was usually followed by as many sequels as the audience would tolerate.

A very popular humorous variety of gesaku fiction was Tōkaidōchū Hizakurige by Jippensha Ikku, the story of the travels and slapstick adventures of two carefree men from Edo along the Tokaido, the broad highway between Kyoto and Edo.

Historically, a specific group of late-Edo period Japanese writers whose work reflected a playful style, a joking and perhaps cynical voice, and disaffection with conventional norms, came to be called gesaku.
