= Kunisada Chūji =

Japanese gambler (1810–1851)

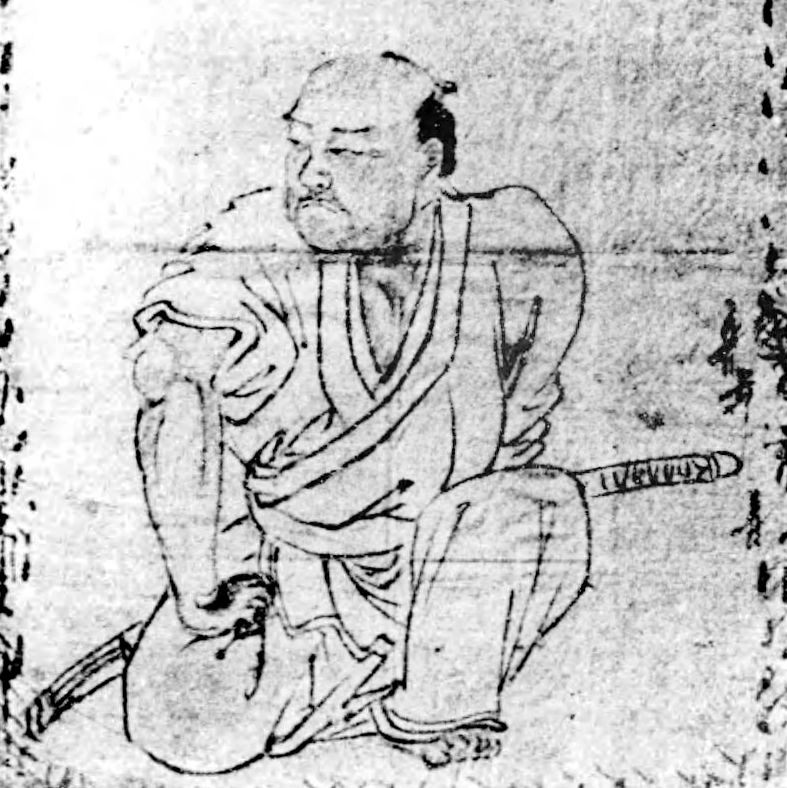
Portrait of Kunisada Chuji by Tazaki Soun

Kunisada Chūji (国定 忠治; 1810–1851) was a popular figure in the Edo period. He was a bakuto (gamblers commonly seen as forerunners to the modern yakuza).

== Romanticized counterpart to Robin Hood ==
His story is mainly responsible for the romanticised "chivalrous bandit" or "Robin Hood" image in Japan. An example was when a village had a famine, he helped the village out.

== Execution ==
He was publicly executed in 1850 for various crimes after a large man-hunt.

== Legacy ==
Chūji is depicted on a 1999 Japanese stamp.

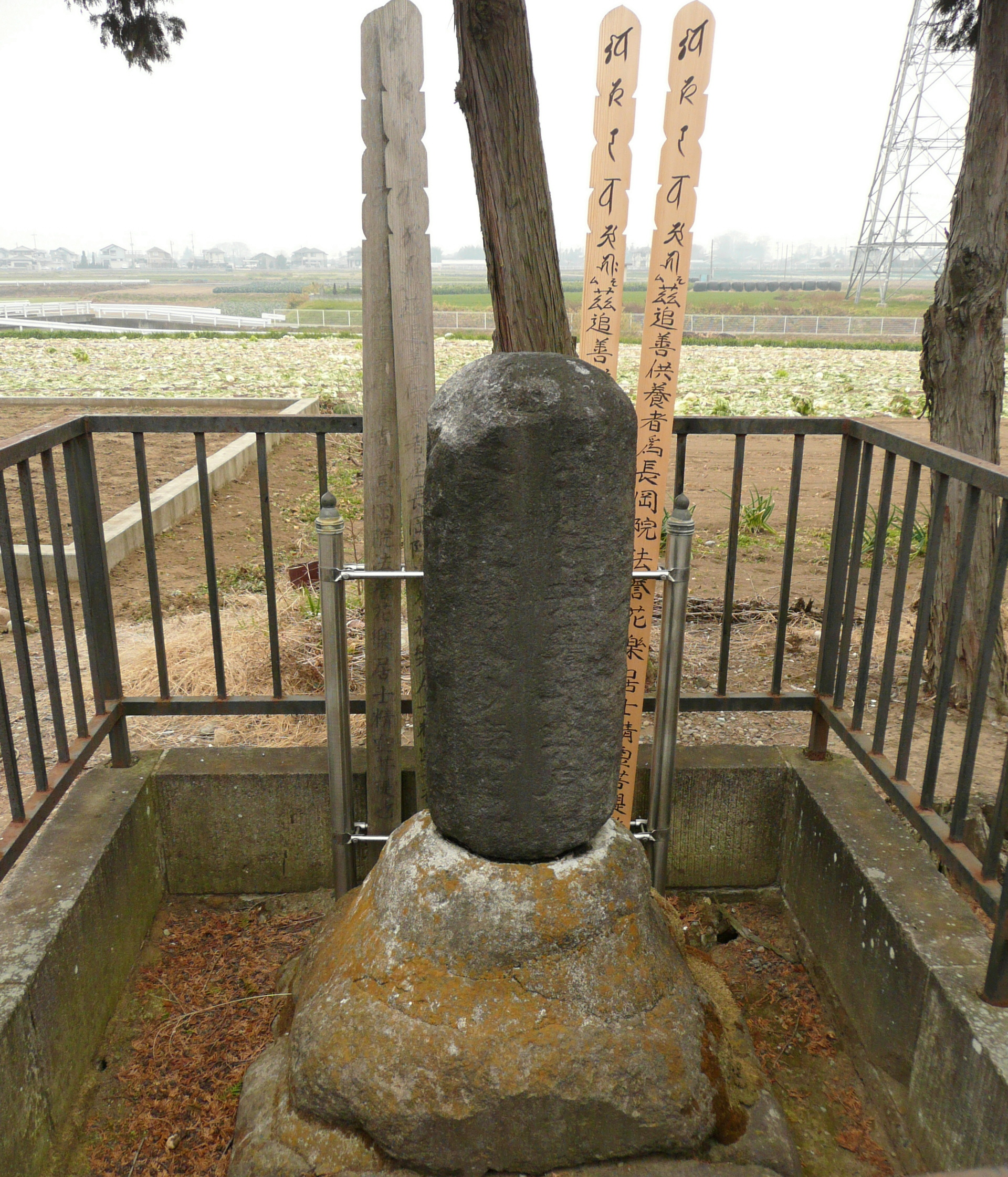
Kunisada Chūji's grave in Isesaki.

== See also ==
- A Diary of Chuji's Travels (忠治旅日記 Chūji tabi nikki)
- Films based on his story in 1954, 1958 and 1960
