= Travel Chronicles of Yaji and Kita =

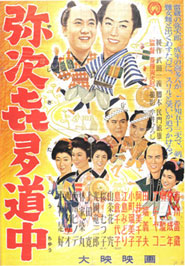
- Japanese movie poster
- Production company: Daiei Film
- Release date: August 22, 1956
- Running time: 79 minutes
- Country: Japan
- Language: Japanese

Travel Chronicles of Yaji and Kita (弥次喜多道中記, Yaji-Kita Dōchū-ki) is a 1956 Japanese film directed by Torajiro Saito.

== Cast ==
- Ichikawa Raizō VIII
