= Oatsurae Jirokichi Koshi =

1931 film

- Directed by: Daisuke Itō
- Produced by: Nikkatsu
- Starring: Denjirō Ōkōchi; Naoe Fushimi; Nobuko Fushimi; Minoru Takase
- Narrated by: Shunsui Matsuda; Midori Sawato
- Cinematography: Hiromitsu Karasawa
- Distributed by: Digital Meme
- Release date: 1931 (Japan)
- Running time: 61 minutes
- Country: Japan
- Language: Japanese

Oatsurae Jirokichi Koshi (Japanese: 御誂治郎吉格子, Hepburn: Jirokichi the Rat) is a 1931 black and white Japanese silent film with benshi accompaniment directed by Daisuke Itō. It is the only completely preserved silent film directed by Ito and relates the life of legendary thief Jirokichi the Rat, in an original story and through the revolutionary use of dynamic intertitles.
