= Yaji and Kita: Yasuda's Rescue =

1927 film

- DVD Cover
- Directed by: Tomiyasu Ikeda
- Written by: Tomiyasu Ikeda
- Produced by: Nikkatsu
- Starring: Denjiro Okochi; Goro Kawabe
- Cinematography: Junichiro Aoshima
- Production company: Nikkatsu
- Release date: 1927
- Running time: 10 reels
- Country: Japan
- Language: Japanese (intertitles)

Yaji and Kita: Yasuda's Rescue (弥次喜多 尊王の巻, Yajikita sonnō no maki; lit. "Yaji and Kita: The Loyalists") is a 1927 Japanese black and white silent comedy film directed by Tomiyasu Ikeda and stars Denjiro Okochi and Goro Kawabe, his senior at Nikkatsu. The film showcases the comic talent of Denjiro Okochi, which contrasts with his performance in Oatsurae Jirokichi Koshi.

== Plot ==
Yaji and Kita are two goofy men, who are captured by the police and saved by a samurai, who is also later arrested, then they decide to save him.

== Cast ==
- Denjiro Okochi - Kita
- Goro Kawabe - Yaji
- Yoneko Sakai
- Koichi Sakuragi

== Versions ==
A 15-minute remnant of the film, which was originally 10-reels long, was released on DVD by Digital Meme with benshi accompaniment by Midori Sawato and Ryubi Kato.
