= Cinema of Japan =

- No. of screens: 3,697 (2025)
  - Per capita: 2.8 per 100,000 (2017)
- Main distributors: Toho (33.7%); Toei (10.5%)

Produced feature films (2025)
- Total: 694

Number of admissions (2025)
- Total: 188,756,000

Gross box office (2025)
- Total: ¥274.4 billion ($1.79 billion)
- National films: ¥207.569 billion (75.6%)

The cinema of Japan (日本映画, Nihon eiga), also known domestically as hōga (邦画; "domestic cinema"), began in the late 1890s. Japan has one of the oldest and largest film industries in the world; as of 2022, it was the fourth largest by number of feature films produced (634) and the third largest in terms of box office revenue ($1.5 billion).

During the 1950s, a period dubbed the "Golden Age of Japanese cinema", the jidaigeki films of Akira Kurosawa and the sci-fi films of Ishirō Honda and Eiji Tsuburaya gained Japanese cinema international praise and made these directors universally renowned and highly influential. Some Japanese films of this period are now considered some of the greatest of all time: in 2012, Yasujirō Ozu's film Tokyo Story (1953) was placed at No. 3 on Sight & Sound's 100 greatest films of all time and dethroned Citizen Kane (1941) atop the Sight & Sound directors' poll of the top 50 greatest films of all time, while Kurosawa's film Seven Samurai (1954) topped the BBC's 2018 survey of the 100 Greatest Foreign-Language Films. Japan has also won the Academy Award for Best International Feature Film (Note: Previously, the category was called Best Foreign Language Film before being updated to Best International Feature Film in April 2019.) five times, (Note: Rashomon (1951), Gate of Hell (1954), Samurai I: Musashi Miyamoto (1955), Departures (2008), and Drive My Car (2021).) more than any other Asian country.

Anime rose in popularity during the 1980s, with new animated films being released every summer and winter, often based upon popular anime television series. Mamoru Oshii released his landmark film Angel's Egg (1985) while Hayao Miyazaki adapted his own manga series Nausicaä of the Valley of Wind into a 1984 film of the same name, and Katsuhiro Otomo followed suit by adapting his own manga series Akira into a 1988 film of the same name. Anime continues to be massively popular around the world, especially the works of Studio Ghibli, which counts among its highest-grossing films Princess Mononoke (1997), Spirited Away (2001), Howl's Moving Castle (2004), Ponyo (2008), and The Boy and the Heron (2023). As of 2025, the top 16 highest-grossing Japanese films worldwide are all anime, and the top 10 (four of which are by Studio Ghibli) were all released in the 21st century.

Although Japanese horror films have been around since the post-war era that began in 1945 and gained recognition with kaiju such as Godzilla (1954), the genre did not experience a popularity boom until the late 1990s, with films such as Ringu (1998), Kairo (2001), Dark Water (2002), Ju-On: The Grudge (2002), Yogen (2004), and One Missed Call (2004) garnering commercial success.

Japan's primary film studios are Toho, Toei, Shochiku, and Kadokawa, which are nicknamed the "Big Four" and are the only members of the Motion Picture Producers Association of Japan (MPPAJ). The Japan Academy Film Prize, hosted annually by the Nippon Academy-shō Association, was created in 1978 and is considered to be the Japanese equivalent of the Academy Awards.

== History ==
=== Early silent era ===
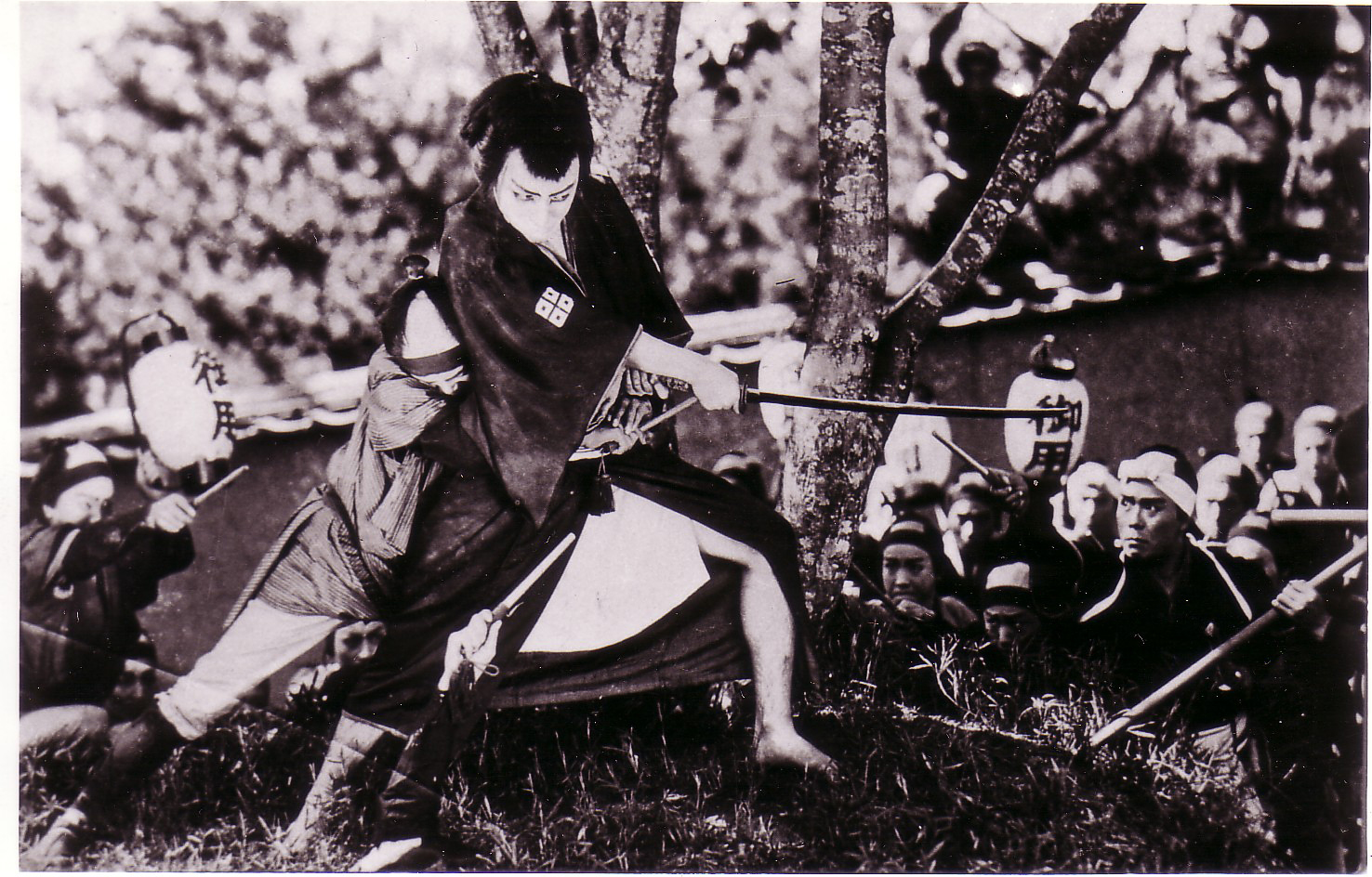
Orochi (Buntarō Futagawa)

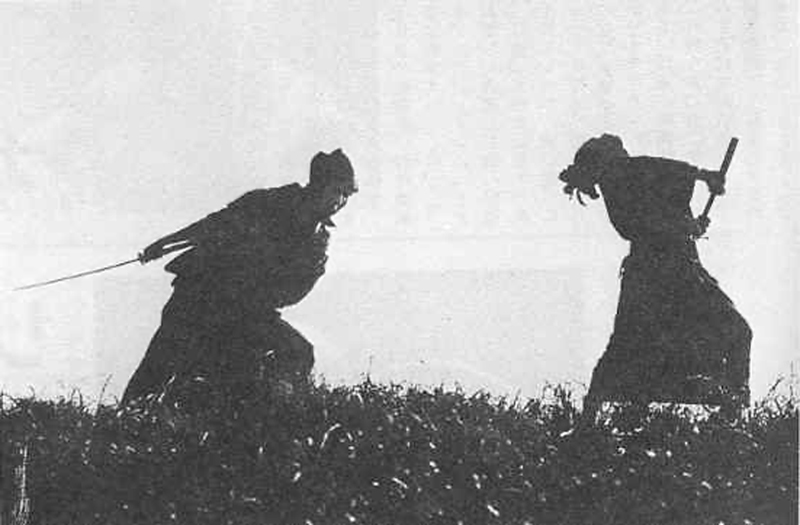
Roningai (Masahiro Makino)

The kinetoscope, first shown commercially by Thomas Edison in the U.S. in 1894, was first shown in Japan in November 1896. The Vitascope and the Lumière Brothers' Cinematograph were first presented in Japan in early 1897, by businessmen such as Inabata Katsutaro. Lumière cameramen were the first to shoot films in Japan. Moving pictures, however, were not an entirely new experience for the Japanese because of their rich tradition of pre-cinematic devices such as gentō (utsushi-e) or the magic lantern. The first successful Japanese film in late 1897 showed sights in Tokyo.

In 1898, some ghost films were made, such as the Shirō Asano shorts Bake Jizo (Jizo the Spook / 化け地蔵) and Shinin no sosei (Resurrection of a Corpse). The first documentary, the short Geisha no teodori (芸者の手踊り), was made in June 1899. Tsunekichi Shibata made a number of early films, including Momijigari, an 1899 record of two famous actors performing a scene from a well-known kabuki play. Early films were influenced by traditional theater – for example, kabuki and bunraku.

=== 20th century ===
At the dawn of the 20th century, theaters in Japan hired benshi, storytellers who sat next to the screen and narrated silent movies. They were descendants of kabuki jōruri, kōdan storytellers, theater barkers and other forms of oral storytelling. Benshi could be accompanied by music like silent films from cinema of the West. With the advent of sound in the early 1930s, the benshi gradually declined.

In 1908, Shōzō Makino, considered the pioneering director of Japanese film, began his influential career with Honnōji gassen (本能寺合戦), produced for Yokota Shōkai. Shōzō recruited Matsunosuke Onoe, a former kabuki actor, to star in his productions. Onoe became Japan's first film star, appearing in over 1,000 films, mostly shorts, between 1909 and 1926. The pair pioneered the jidaigeki genre. Tokihiko Okada was a popular romantic lead of the same era.

The first Japanese film production studio was built in 1909 by the Yoshizawa Shōten company in Tokyo.

The first female Japanese performer to appear in a film professionally was the dancer/actress Tokuko Nagai Takagi, who appeared in four shorts for the American-based Thanhouser Company between 1911 and 1914.

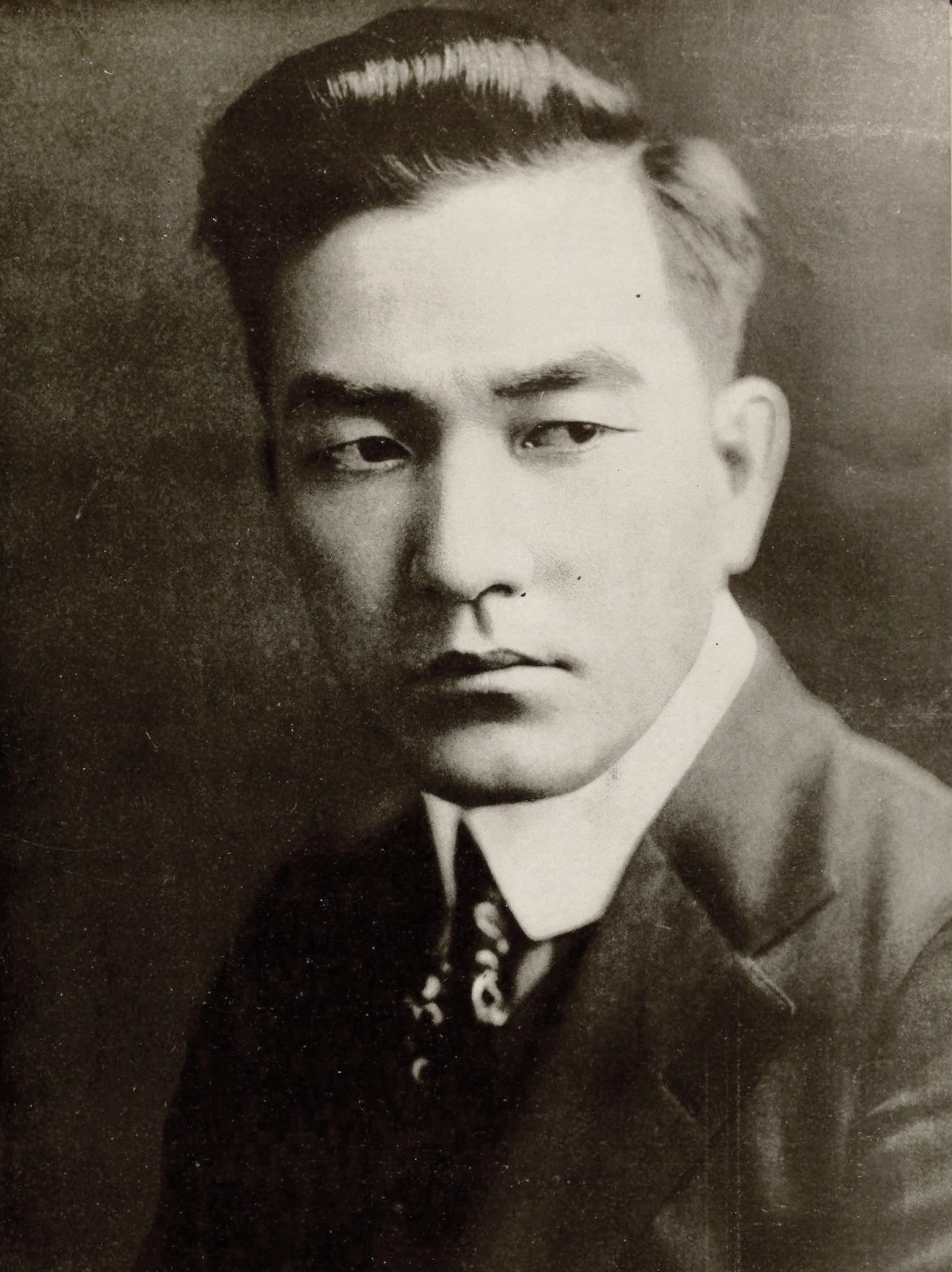
Kintaro Hayakawa, one of the biggest stars in Hollywood during the silent film era of the 1910s and 1920s

Among intellectuals, critiques of Japanese cinema grew in the 1910s and eventually developed into a movement that transformed Japanese film. Film criticism began with early film magazines such as Katsudō shashinkai (begun in 1909) and a full-length book written by Yasunosuke Gonda in 1914, but many early film critics often focused on chastising the work of studios like Nikkatsu and Tenkatsu for being too theatrical (using, for instance, elements from kabuki and shinpa such as onnagata) and for not utilizing what were considered more cinematic techniques to tell stories, instead relying on benshi. In what was later named the Pure Film Movement, writers in magazines such as Kinema Record called for a broader use of such cinematic techniques. Some of these critics, such as Norimasa Kaeriyama, went on to put their ideas into practice by directing such films as The Glow of Life (1918), which was one of the first films to use actresses (in this case, Harumi Hanayagi). There were parallel efforts elsewhere in the film industry. In his 1917 film The Captain's Daughter (based on the play by Choji Nakauchi, based in turn on the German film, Gendarm Möbius), Masao Inoue started using techniques new to the silent film era, such as the close-up and cut back. The Pure Film Movement was central in the development of the gendaigeki and scriptwriting.

New studios established around 1920, such as Shochiku and Taikatsu, aided the cause for reform. At Taikatsu, Thomas Kurihara directed films scripted by the novelist Junichiro Tanizaki, who was a strong advocate of film reform. Even Nikkatsu produced reformist films under the direction of Eizō Tanaka. By the mid-1920s, actresses had replaced onnagata and films used more of the devices pioneered by Inoue. Some of the most discussed silent films from Japan are those of Kenji Mizoguchi, whose later works (including Ugetsu/Ugetsu Monogatari) retain a very high reputation.

Japanese films gained popularity in the mid-1920s against foreign films, in part fueled by the popularity of movie stars and a new style of jidaigeki. Directors such as Daisuke Itō and Masahiro Makino made samurai films like A Diary of Chuji's Travels and Roningai featuring rebellious antiheroes in fast-cut fight scenes that were both critically acclaimed and commercial successes. Some stars, such as Tsumasaburo Bando, Kanjūrō Arashi, Chiezō Kataoka, Takako Irie and Utaemon Ichikawa, were inspired by Makino Film Productions and formed their own independent production companies where directors such as Hiroshi Inagaki, Mansaku Itami and Sadao Yamanaka honed their skills. Director Teinosuke Kinugasa created a production company to produce the experimental masterpiece A Page of Madness, starring Masao Inoue, in 1926. Many of these companies, while surviving during the silent era against major studios like Nikkatsu, Shochiku, Teikine, and Toa Studios, could not survive the cost involved in converting to sound.

With the rise of left-wing political movements and labor unions at the end of the 1920s, there arose so-called tendency films with left-leaning tendencies. Directors Kenji Mizoguchi, Daisuke Itō, Shigeyoshi Suzuki, and Tomu Uchida were prominent examples. In contrast to these commercially produced 35 mm films, the Marxist Proletarian Film League of Japan (Prokino) made works independently in smaller gauges (such as 9.5mm and 16mm), with more radical intentions. Tendency films suffered from severe censorship heading into the 1930s, and Prokino members were arrested and the movement effectively crushed. Such moves by the government had profound effects on the expression of political dissent in 1930s cinema. Films from this period include: Sakanaya Honda, Jitsuroku Chushingura, Horaijima, Orochi, Maboroshi, Kurutta Ippeji, Jujiro, Kurama Tengu: Kyōfu Jidai, and Kurama Tengu.

The 1923 earthquake, the bombing of Tokyo during World War II, and the natural effects of time and Japan's humidity on flammable and unstable nitrate film have resulted in a great dearth of surviving films from this period.^{Ref?}

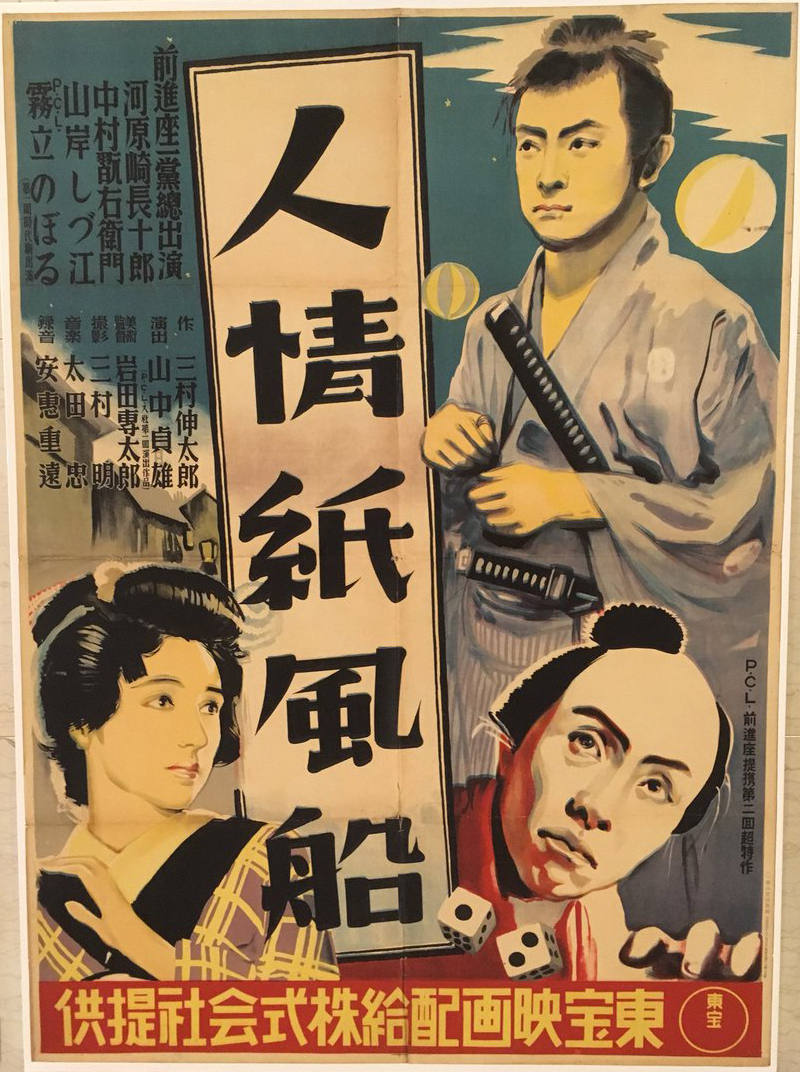
Cinema poster for Sadao Yamanaka's 1937 Humanity and Paper Balloons

Unlike in the West, silent films were still being produced in Japan well into the 1930s; as late as 1938, a third of Japanese films were silent. For instance, Yasujirō Ozu's An Inn in Tokyo (1935), considered a precursor to the neorealism genre, was a silent film. A few Japanese sound shorts were made in the 1920s and 1930s, but Japan's first feature-length talkie was Fujiwara Yoshie no furusato (1930), which used the Mina Talkie System. Notable talkies of this period include Mikio Naruse's Wife, Be Like A Rose! (Tsuma Yo Bara No Yoni, 1935), which was one of the first Japanese films to gain a theatrical release in the U.S.; Kenji Mizoguchi's Sisters of the Gion (Gion no shimai, 1936); Osaka Elegy (1936); The Story of the Last Chrysanthemums (1939); and Sadao Yamanaka's Humanity and Paper Balloons (1937).

Film criticism shared this vitality, with many film journals such as Kinema Junpo and newspapers printing detailed discussions of the cinema of the day, both at home and abroad. A cultured "impressionist" criticism pursued by critics such as Tadashi Iijima, Fuyuhiko Kitagawa, and Matsuo Kishi was dominant, but opposed by leftist critics such as Akira Iwasaki and Genjū Sasa who sought an ideological critique of films.

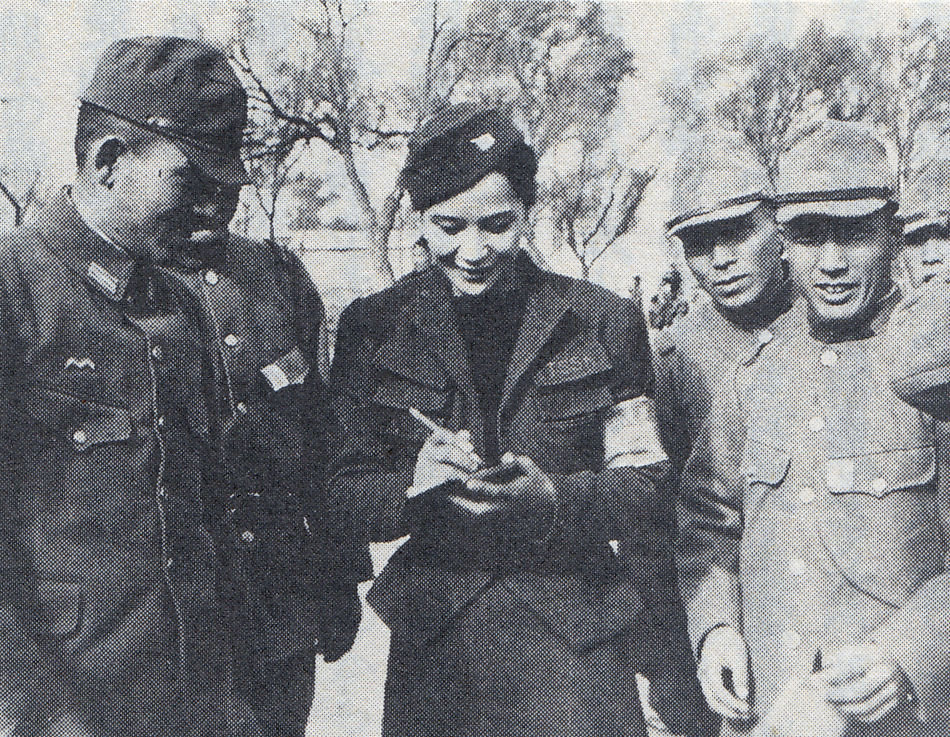
Japanese actress Takiko Mizunoe signing autographs for Japanese soldiers in Northern China, 1938

The 1930s also saw increased government involvement in cinema, which was symbolized by the passing of the Film Law, which gave the state more authority over the film industry, in 1939. The government encouraged some forms of cinema, producing propaganda films and promoting documentary films (also called bunka eiga or "culture films"), with important documentaries being made by directors such as Fumio Kamei. Realism was in favor; film theorists such as Taihei Imamura and Heiichi Sugiyama advocated for documentary or realist drama, while directors such as Hiroshi Shimizu and Tomotaka Tasaka produced fiction films that were strongly realistic in style. Films reinforced the importance of traditional Japanese values against the rise of the Westernised modern girl, a character epitomised by Shizue Tatsuta in Ozu's 1930 film Young Lady.

==== Wartime movies ====
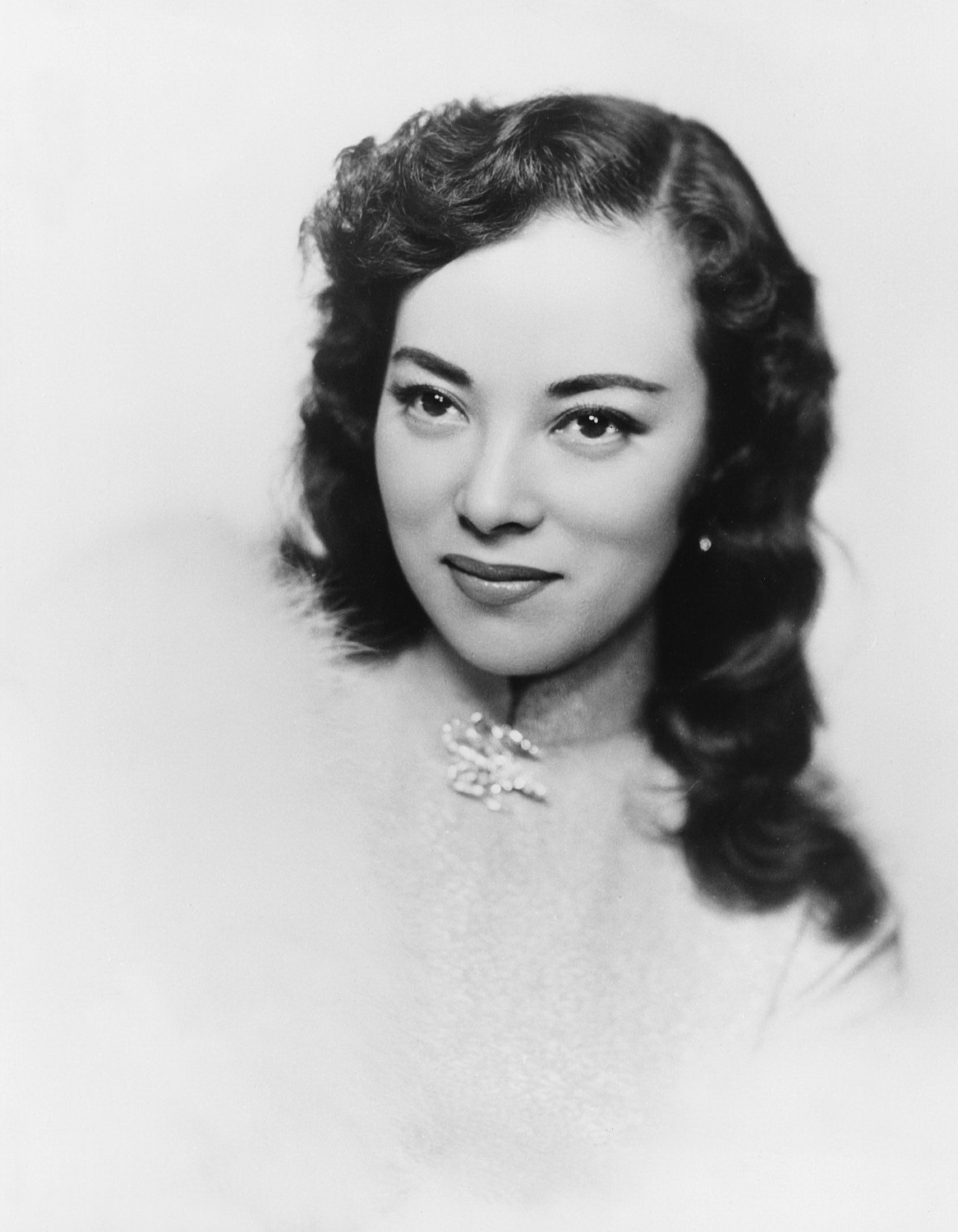
Yoshiko Yamaguchi

Because of World War II and the weak economy, unemployment became widespread in Japan, and the cinema industry suffered.

During this period, when Japan was expanding its empire, the Japanese government saw cinema as a propaganda tool to show the glory and invincibility of the Empire of Japan. Thus, many films from this period depict patriotic and militaristic themes. In 1942, Kajiro Yamamoto's film The War at Sea from Hawaii to Malaya portrayed the attack on Pearl Harbor; the film made use of special effects directed by Eiji Tsuburaya, including a miniature scale model of Pearl Harbor itself.

Kamishibai (紙芝居) or paper theater was a popular form of street entertainment, especially for the children. Kamishibai was often used to tell stories of Buddhist deities and the history of some Buddhist temples. In 1920 it started out as normal storytelling for the children, but in about 1932, it started to lean more to a militaristic viewpoint.

Yoshiko Yamaguchi was a very popular actress. She rose to international stardom with 22 wartime movies. The Manchukuo Film Association let her use the Chinese name Li Xianglan so she could represent Chinese roles in Japanese propaganda movies. After the war she used her official Japanese name and starred in an additional 29 movies. She was elected as a member of the Japanese parliament in the 1970s and served for 18 years.

Akira Kurosawa made his feature film debut with Sugata Sanshiro in 1943.

==== American occupation ====
After the surrender of Japan in 1945, wartime controls and restrictions on the Japanese film industry were abolished, and the Supreme Commander for the Allied Powers (SCAP) established the Civil Information and Education Section (CIE), which came to manage the industry. All film proposals and screenplays were to be processed and approved by CIE. The script would then be processed by the Civil Censorship Detachment (CCD), which was under the direct control of American military. Pre-war and wartime films were also subject to review, and over 500 were condemned, with half of them being burned. In addition, Toho and Daiei pre-emptively destroyed films they thought to be incriminating. In November 1945, CIE announced that it would forbid films deemed to be:

1. infused with militarism;
2. showing revenge as a legitimate motive;
3. nationalistic;
4. chauvinistic and anti-foreign;
5. distorting historical facts;
6. favoring racial or religious discrimination;
7. portraying feudal loyalty or contempt of life as desirable and honorable;
8. approving suicide either directly or indirectly;
9. dealing with or approving the subjugation or degradation of women;
10. depicting brutality, violence or evil as triumphant;
11. anti-democratic;
12. condoning the exploitation of children; or
13. at variance with the spirit or letter of the Potsdam Declaration or any SCAP directive

A major consequence of these restrictions was that the production of jidaigeki films, especially those involving samurai, became effectively impossible. A notable case of censorship was of the war film Escape at Dawn, written by Akira Kurosawa and Senkichi Taniguchi, which was re-written over a dozen times at the request of CIE, largely erasing the original content of the story. On the other hand, the CIE favored the production of films that reflected the policies of the Occupation, such as agricultural reform and the organization of labor unions, and promoted the peaceful redevelopment of Japan and the rights of individuals.

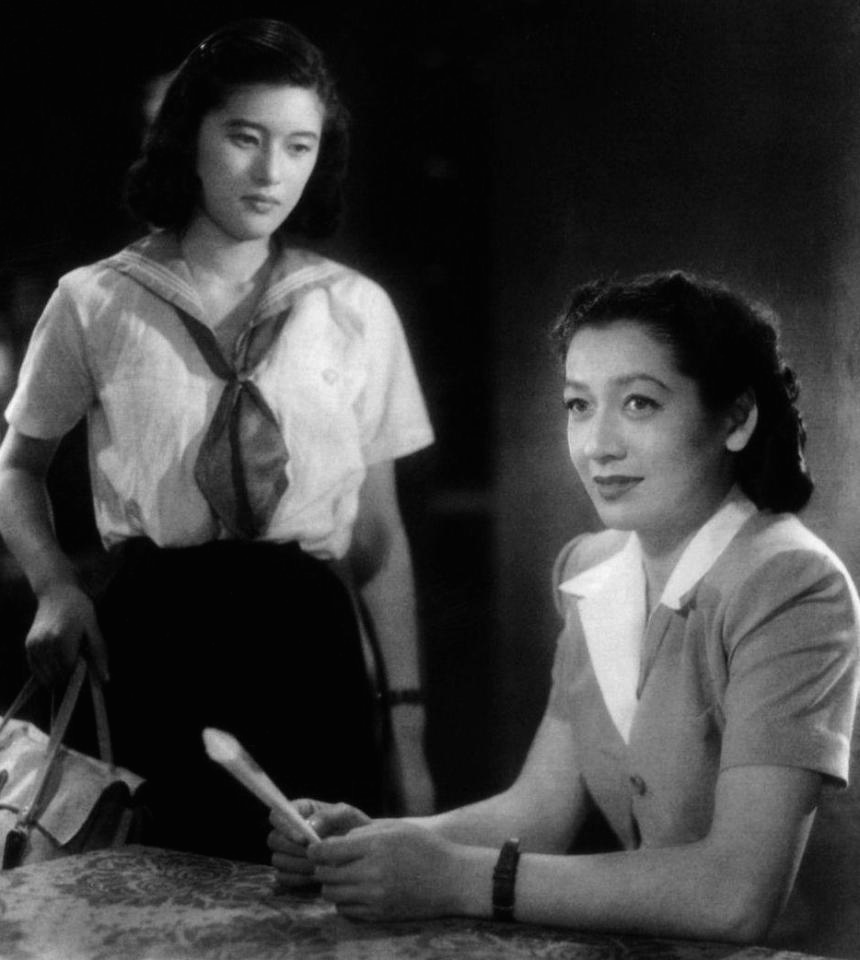
Aoi sanmyaku (1949) starring Yōko Sugi and Setsuko Hara

Significant movies among them are, Setsuko Hara appeared in Akira Kurosawa's No Regrets for Our Youth (1946), Kōzaburō Yoshimura's A Ball at the Anjo House (1947), Tadashi Imai's Aoi sanmyaku (1949), etc. It gained national popularity as a star symbolizing the beginning of a new era. In Yasushi Sasaki's Hatachi no Seishun (1946), the first kiss scene of a Japanese movie was filmed. The Mainichi Film Award was also created in 1946.

The first movie released after the war was Soyokaze, directed by Yasushi Sasaki, and the theme song Ringo no Uta was a big hit.

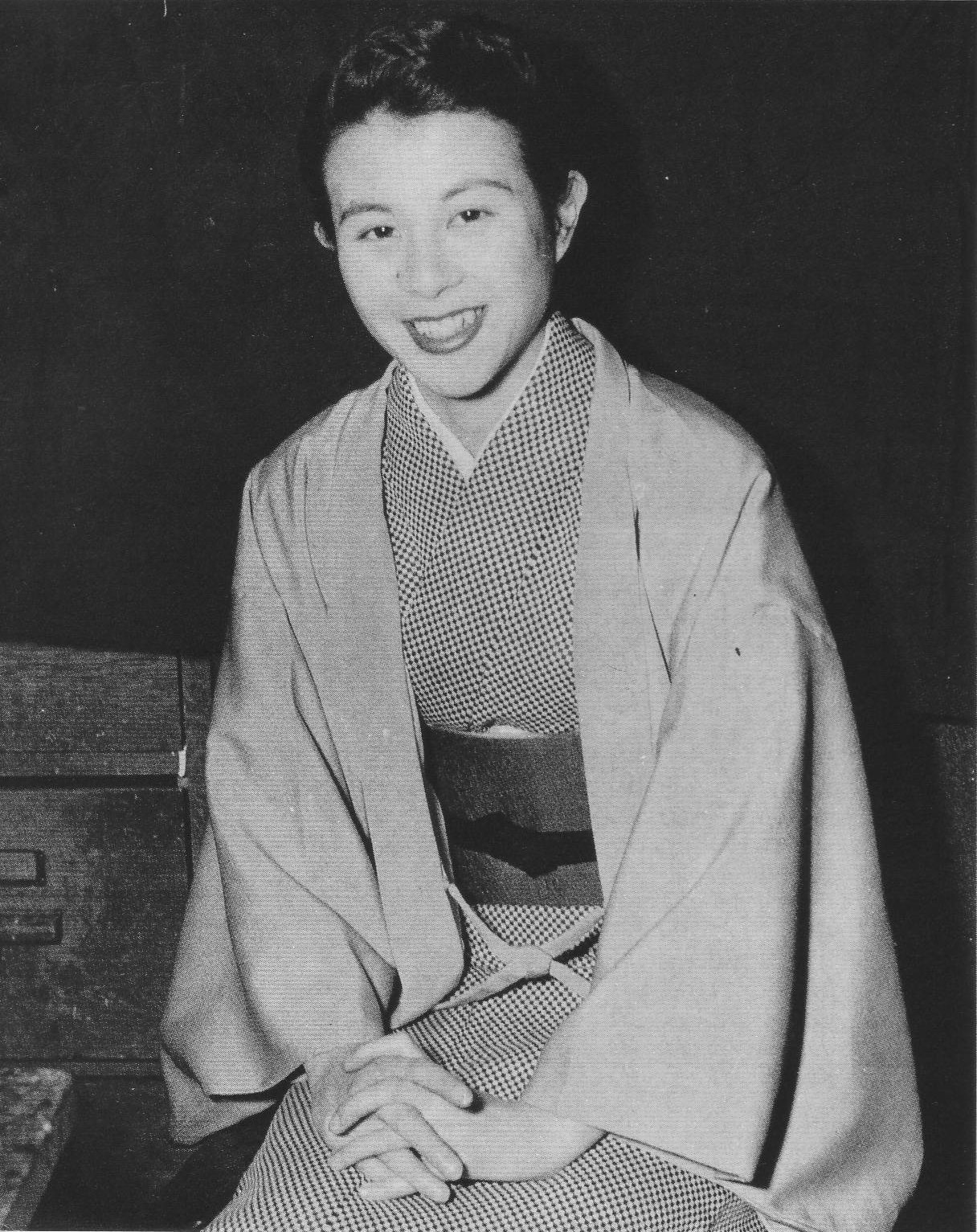
Yoshiko Kuga

The first collaborations between Akira Kurosawa and actor Toshiro Mifune were Drunken Angel in 1948 and Stray Dog in 1949. Yasujirō Ozu directed the critically and commercially successful Late Spring in 1949.

In the later half of the Occupation, the Reverse Course came into effect. Left-wing filmmakers displaced from the major studios in the Red Purge joined those displaced after suppression of the Toho strikes, forming a new independent film movement. Directors such as Fumio Kamei, Tadashi Imai and Satsuo Yamamoto were members of the Japanese Communist Party. Independent social realist dramas saw a small and temporary boom amid the wave of sentimental war dramas produced after the end of Occupation.

==== Golden Age ====
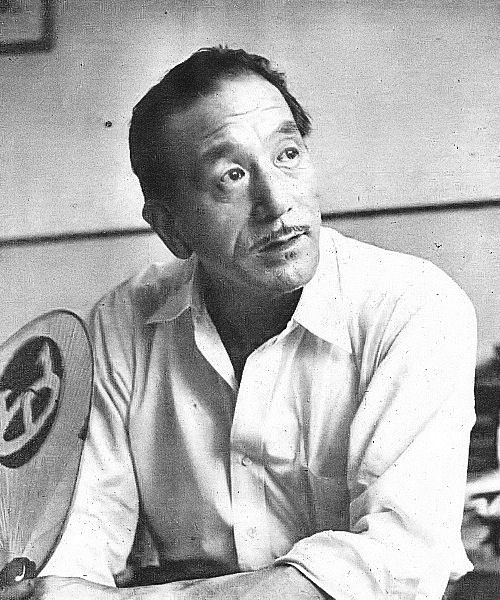
Yasujirō Ozu

The 1950s are widely considered the Golden Age of Japanese cinema. Three Japanese films from this decade (Rashomon, Seven Samurai and Tokyo Story) appeared in the top ten of Sight & Sound's critics' and directors' polls for the best films of all time in 2002. They also appeared in the 2012 polls, with Tokyo Story (1953) dethroning Citizen Kane at the top of the 2012 directors' poll.

War movies covering themes previously restricted by SCAP began to be produced, such as Hideo Sekigawa's Listen to the Voices of the Sea (1950), Tadashi Imai's Himeyuri no Tô (Tower of the Lilies, 1953), Keisuke Kinoshita's Twenty-Four Eyes (1954) and Kon Ichikawa's The Burmese Harp (1956). Works showcasing tragic and sentimental retrospectives of the war experience became a public phenomenon. Other films produced include Battleship Yamato (1953) and Eagle of the Pacific (1953). Under these circumstances, movies such as Emperor Meiji and the Russo-Japanese War (明治天皇と日露大戦争, 1957), where Kanjūrō Arashi played Emperor Meiji, also appeared. It was a situation that was unthinkable before the war, the commercialization of the Emperor who was supposed to be sacred and inviolable.

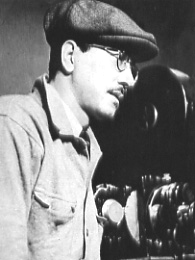
Kajirō Yamamoto

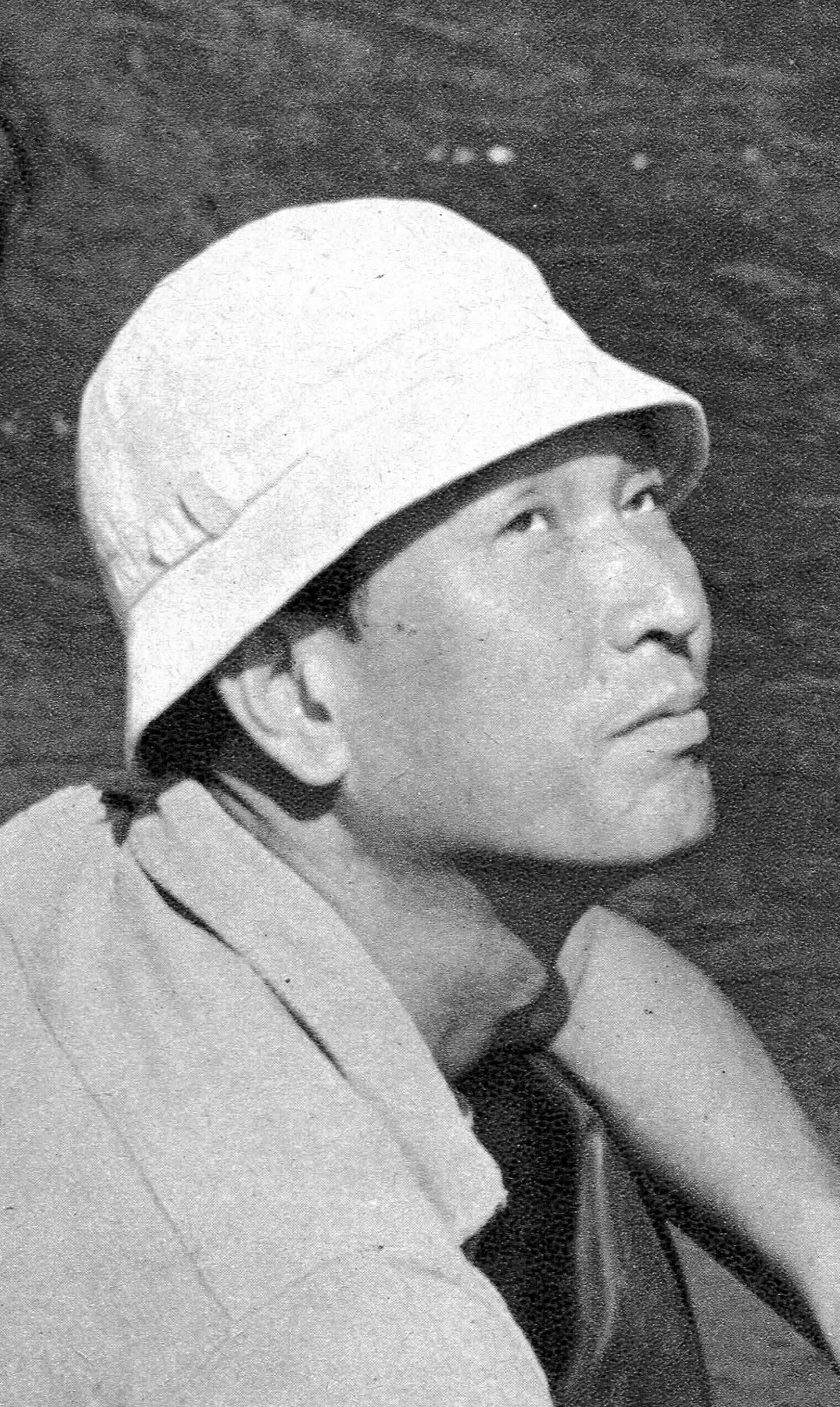
Akira Kurosawa

The period after the American Occupation led to a rise in diversity in movie distribution thanks to the increased output and popularity of the film studios of Toho, Daiei, Shochiku, Nikkatsu, and Toei. This period gave rise to the six great artists of Japanese cinema: Masaki Kobayashi, Akira Kurosawa, Ishirō Honda, Eiji Tsuburaya, Kenji Mizoguchi, and Yasujirō Ozu. Each director dealt with the effects the war and subsequent occupation by America in unique and innovative ways. During this decade, the works of Kurosawa, Honda, and Tsuburaya would become the first Japanese films to be widely distributed in foreign theaters.

The decade started with Akira Kurosawa's Rashomon (1950), which won the Golden Lion at the Venice Film Festival in 1951 and the Academy Honorary Award for Best Foreign Language Film in 1952, and marked the entrance of Japanese cinema onto the world stage. It was also the breakout role for legendary star Toshiro Mifune. In 1953, Entotsu no mieru basho by Heinosuke Gosho was in competition at the 3rd Berlin International Film Festival.

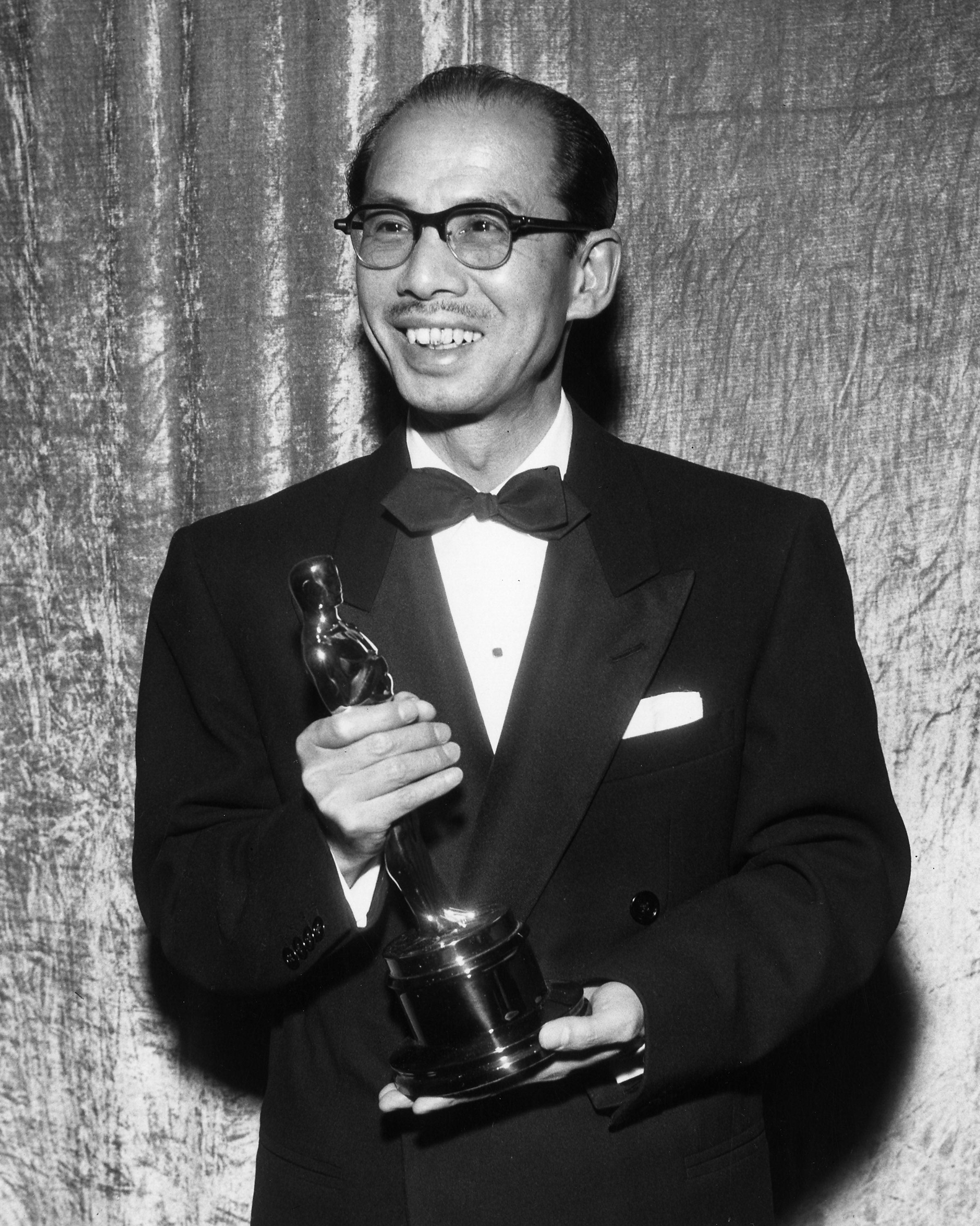
Masaichi Nagata, the "Father of cinema", receiving an award at the 27th Academy Awards for Gate of Hell.

The first Japanese film in color was Carmen Comes Home directed by Keisuke Kinoshita and released in 1951. There was also a black-and-white version of this film available. Tokyo File 212 (1951) was the first American feature film to be shot entirely in Japan. The lead roles were played by Florence Marly and Robert Peyton. It featured the geisha Ichimaru in a short cameo. Suzuki Ikuzo's Tonichi Enterprises Company co-produced the film. Gate of Hell, a 1953 film by Teinosuke Kinugasa, was the first movie that filmed using Eastmancolor film, Gate of Hell was both Daiei's first color film and the first Japanese color movie to be released outside Japan, receiving an Academy Honorary Award in 1954 for Best Costume Design by Sanzo Wada and an Honorary Award for Best Foreign Language Film. It also won the Palme d'Or at the Cannes Film Festival, the first Japanese film to achieve that honour.

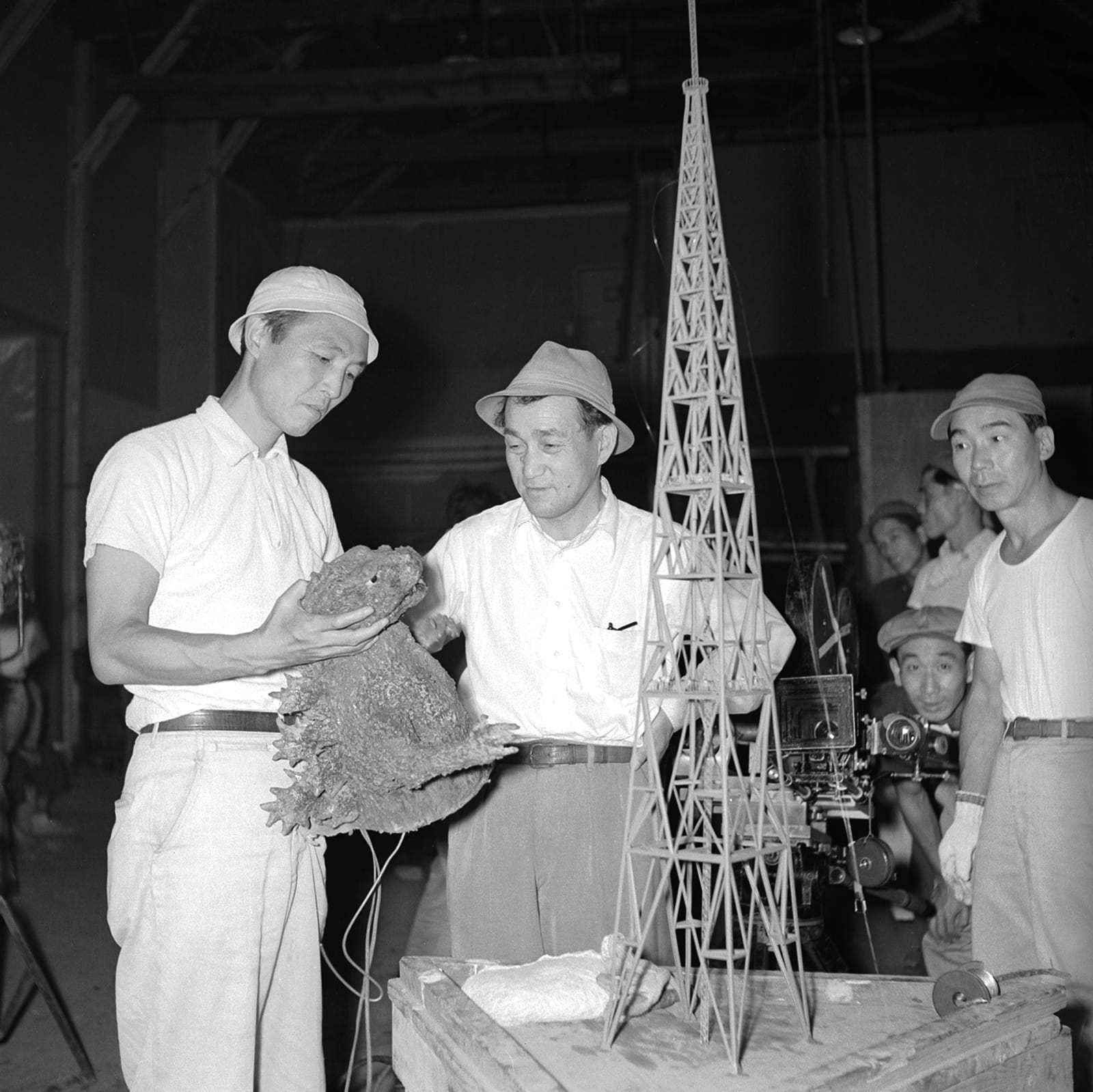
Director Ishirō Honda (left) and effects director Eiji Tsuburaya (center) on the set of Godzilla (1954)

The year 1954 saw two of Japan's most influential films released. The first was the Kurosawa epic Seven Samurai, about a band of hired samurai who protect a helpless village from a rapacious gang of thieves. The same year, Kurosawa's friend and colleague Ishirō Honda directed the anti-nuclear monster-drama Godzilla, featuring award-winning effects by Eiji Tsuburaya. The latter film was first ever Japanese film to be given a wide release throughout the United States, where it was heavily re-edited, and featured new footage with actor Raymond Burr for its distribution in 1956 as Godzilla, King of the Monsters!. Although it was edited for its Western release, Godzilla became an international icon of Japan and spawned an entire subgenre of kaiju films, as well as the longest-running film franchise in history. Also in 1954, another Kurosawa film, Ikiru was in competition at the 4th Berlin International Film Festival.

In 1955, Hiroshi Inagaki won an Academy Honorary Award for Best Foreign Language Film for Part I of his Samurai trilogy and in 1958 won the Golden Lion at the Venice Film Festival for Rickshaw Man. Kon Ichikawa directed two anti-war dramas: The Burmese Harp (1956), which was nominated for Best Foreign Language Film at the Academy Awards, and Fires on the Plain (1959), along with Enjo (1958), which was adapted from Yukio Mishima's novel Temple of The Golden Pavilion. Masaki Kobayashi made three films which would collectively become known as The Human Condition Trilogy: No Greater Love (1959), and The Road to Eternity (1959). The trilogy was completed in 1961, with A Soldier's Prayer.

Kenji Mizoguchi, who died in 1956, ended his career with a series of masterpieces including The Life of Oharu (1952), Ugetsu (1953) and Sansho the Bailiff (1954). He won the Silver Lion at the Venice Film Festival for Ugetsu. Mizoguchi's films often deal with the tragedies inflicted on women by Japanese society. Mikio Naruse made Repast (1950), Late Chrysanthemums (1954), Sound of the Mountain (1954) and Floating Clouds (1955). Yasujirō Ozu began directing color films beginning with Equinox Flower (1958), and later Good Morning (1959) and Floating Weeds (1958), which was adapted from his earlier silent A Story of Floating Weeds (1934), and was shot by Rashomon and Sansho the Bailiff cinematographer Kazuo Miyagawa.

The Blue Ribbon Awards were established in 1950. The first winner for Best Film was Until We Meet Again by Tadashi Imai.

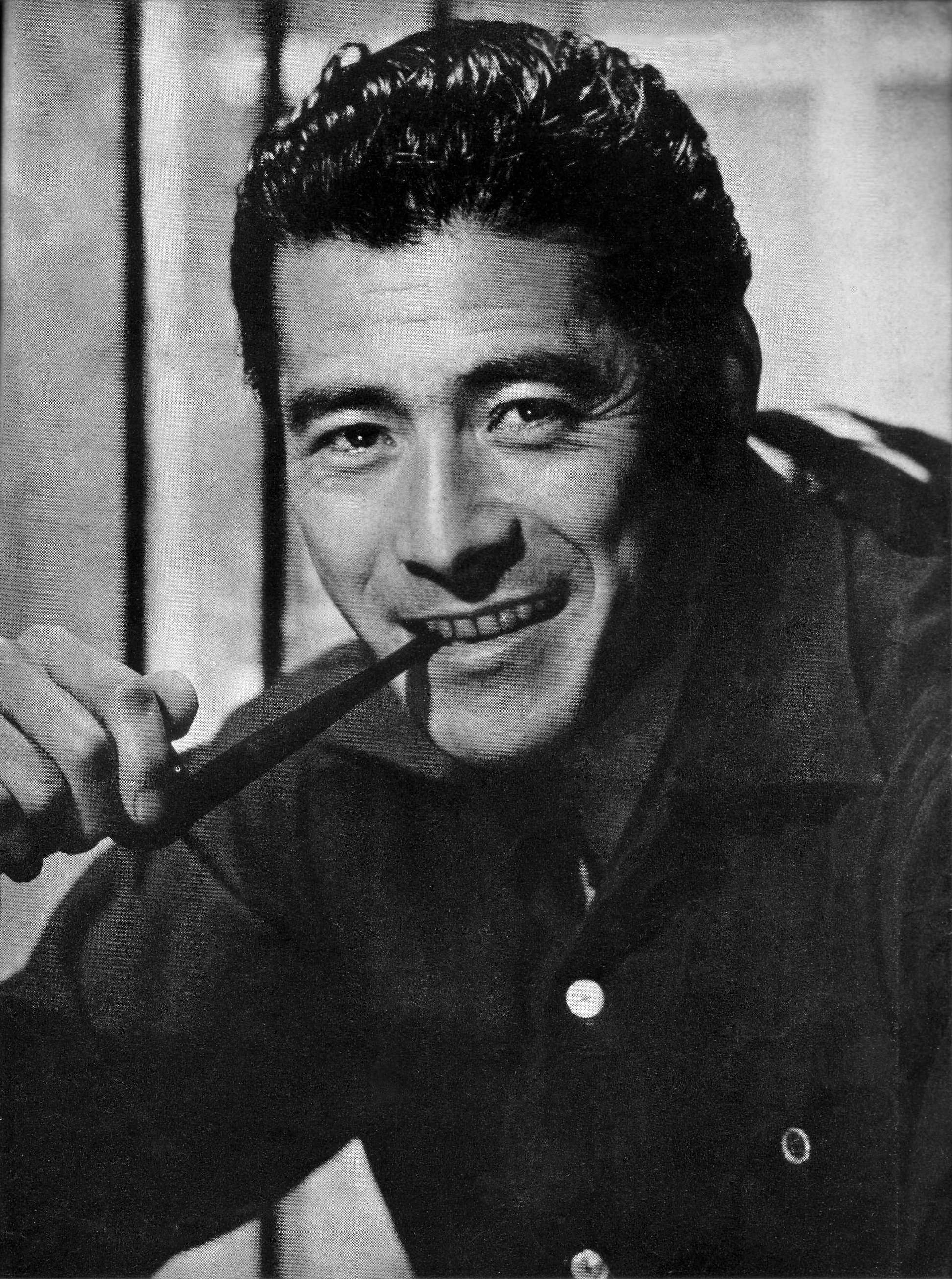
Toshiro Mifune was at the center of many of Kurosawa's films.

The number of films produced, and the cinema audience reached a peak in the 1960s. Most films were shown in double bills, with one half of the bill being a "program picture" or B movie. A typical program picture was shot in four weeks. The demand for these program pictures in quantity meant the growth of film series such as The Hoodlum Soldier or Akumyo.

The huge level of activity of 1960s Japanese cinema also resulted in many classics. Akira Kurosawa directed the 1961 classic Yojimbo. Yasujirō Ozu made his final film, An Autumn Afternoon, in 1962. Mikio Naruse directed the wide screen melodrama When a Woman Ascends the Stairs in 1960; his final film was 1967's Scattered Clouds.

Kon Ichikawa captured the watershed 1964 Olympics in his three-hour documentary Tokyo Olympiad (1965). Seijun Suzuki was fired by Nikkatsu for "making films that don't make any sense and don't make any money" after his surrealist yakuza flick Branded to Kill (1967).

The 1960s were the peak years of the Japanese New Wave movement, which began in the 1950s and continued through the early 1970s. Nagisa Oshima, Kaneto Shindo, Masahiro Shinoda, Susumu Hani and Shohei Imamura emerged as major filmmakers during the decade. Oshima's Cruel Story of Youth, Night and Fog in Japan and Death by Hanging, along with Shindo's Onibaba, Hani's Kanojo to kare and Imamura's The Insect Woman, became some of the better-known examples of Japanese New Wave filmmaking. Documentary played a crucial role in the New Wave, as directors such as Hani, Kazuo Kuroki, Toshio Matsumoto, and Hiroshi Teshigahara moved from documentary into fiction film, while feature filmmakers like Oshima and Imamura also made documentaries. Shinsuke Ogawa and Noriaki Tsuchimoto became the most important documentarists: "two figures [that] tower over the landscape of Japanese documentary."

Teshigahara's Woman in the Dunes (1964) won the Special Jury Prize at the Cannes Film Festival, and was nominated for Best Director and Best Foreign Language Film Oscars. Masaki Kobayashi's Kwaidan (1965) also picked up the Special Jury Prize at Cannes and received a nomination for Best Foreign Language Film at the Academy Awards. Bushido, Samurai Saga by Tadashi Imai won the Golden Bear at the 13th Berlin International Film Festival. Immortal Love by Keisuke Kinoshita and Twin Sisters of Kyoto and Portrait of Chieko, both by Noboru Nakamura, also received nominations for Best Foreign Language Film at the Academy Awards. Lost Spring, also by Nakamura, was in competition for the Golden Bear at the 17th Berlin International Film Festival.

The 1970s saw the cinema audience drop due to the spread of television. Total audience declined from 1.2 billion in 1960 to 0.2 billion in 1980. Film companies refused to hire top actors and directors, not even the companies' production skills to the television industry, thereby making the film companies losing money.

Film companies fought back in various ways, such as the bigger budget films of Kadokawa Pictures, or including increasingly sexual or violent content and language which could not be shown on television. The resulting pink film industry became the stepping stone for many young independent filmmakers. The seventies also saw the start of the "idol eiga", films starring young "idols", who would bring in audiences due to their fame and popularity.

Toshiya Fujita made the revenge film Lady Snowblood in 1973. In the same year, Yoshishige Yoshida made the film Coup d'État, a portrait of Ikki Kita, the leader of the Japanese coup of February 1936. Its experimental cinematography and mise-en-scène, as well as its avant-garde score by Toshi Ichiyanagi, garnered it wide critical acclaim within Japan.

In 1976, the Hochi Film Award was created. The first winner for Best Film was The Inugamis by Kon Ichikawa. Nagisa Oshima directed In the Realm of the Senses (1976), a film detailing a crime of passion involving Sada Abe set in the 1930s. Controversial for its explicit sexual content, it has never been seen uncensored in Japan.

Kinji Fukasaku completed the epic Battles Without Honor and Humanity series of yakuza films. Yoji Yamada introduced the commercially successful Tora-San series, while also directing other films, notably the popular The Yellow Handkerchief, which won the first Japan Academy Prize for Best Film in 1978. New wave filmmakers Susumu Hani and Shōhei Imamura retreated to documentary work, though Imamura made a dramatic return to feature filmmaking with Vengeance Is Mine (1979).

Dodes'ka-den by Akira Kurosawa and Sandakan No. 8 by Kei Kumai were nominated to the Academy Award for Best Foreign Language Film.

The 1980s saw the decline of the major Japanese film studios and their associated chains of cinemas, with major studios Toho and Toei barely staying in business, Shochiku supported almost solely by the Otoko wa tsurai yo films, and Nikkatsu declining even further.

Of the older generation of directors, Akira Kurosawa directed Kagemusha (1980), which won the Palme d'Or at the 1980 Cannes Film Festival, and Ran (1985). Seijun Suzuki made a comeback beginning with Zigeunerweisen in 1980. Shohei Imamura won the Palme d'Or at the Cannes Film Festival for The Ballad of Narayama (1983). Yoshishige Yoshida made A Promise (1986), his first film since 1973's Coup d'État.

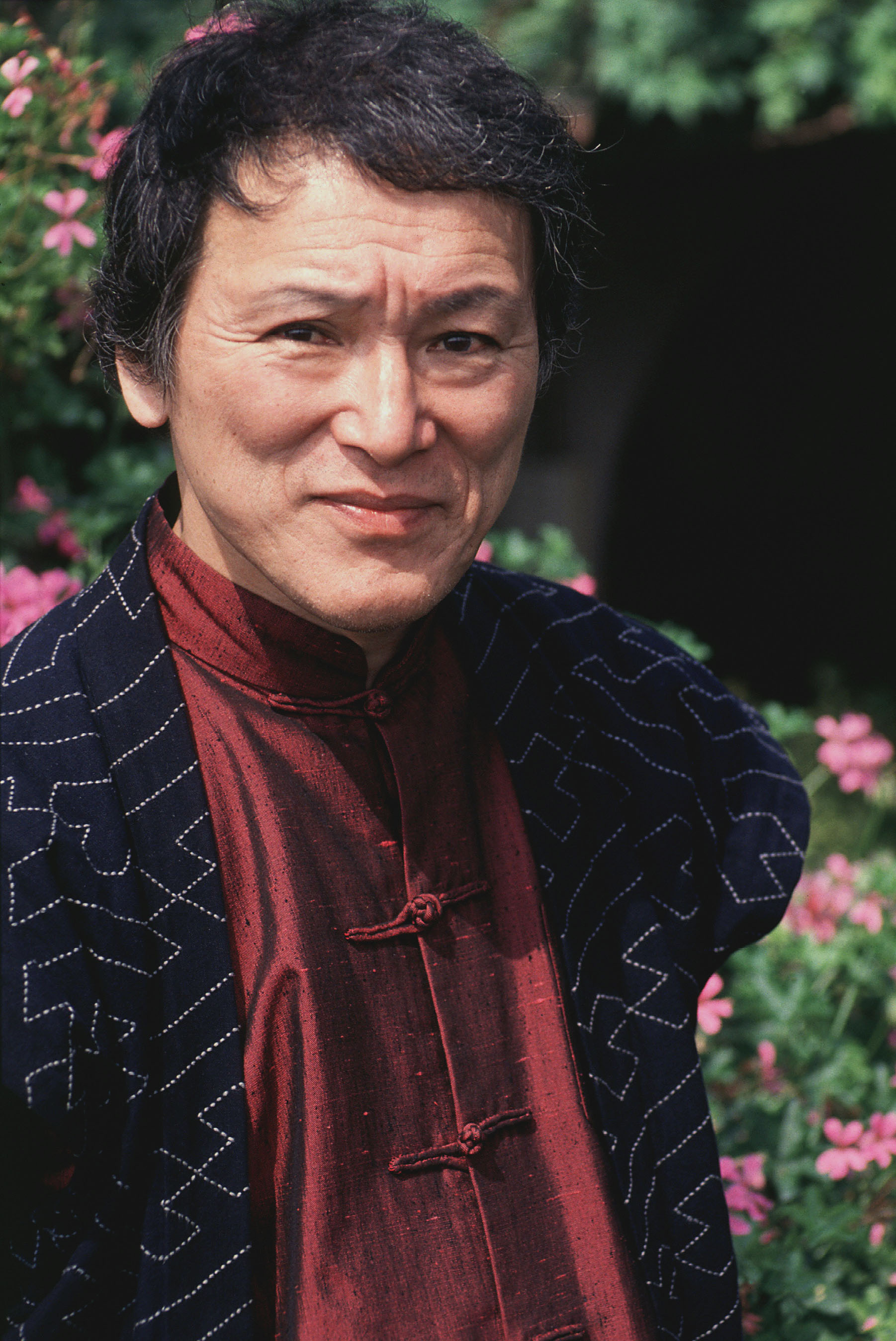
Juzo Itami

New directors who appeared in the 1980s include actor Juzo Itami, who directed his first film, The Funeral, in 1984, and achieved critical and box office success with Tampopo in 1985. Shinji Sōmai, an artistically inclined populist director who made films like the youth-focused Typhoon Club, and the critically acclaimed Roman porno Love Hotel among others. Kiyoshi Kurosawa, who would generate international attention beginning in the mid-1990s, made his initial debut with pink films and genre horror.

During the 1980s, anime rose in popularity, with new animated movies released every summer and winter, often based upon popular anime television series. Mamoru Oshii released his landmark Angel's Egg in 1985 while Hayao Miyazaki adapted his manga series, Nausicaä of the Valley of Wind, into a feature film of the same name in 1984. Katsuhiro Otomo followed suit by adapting his own manga Akira into a feature film of the same name in 1988.

Eventually the home video made it possible to where the Japanese civilians, and eventually citizens in other countries, could watch these films individually. This would increase sales in the direct-to-video film industry, allowing for further developments, such as DVD's and eventual streaming services, to develop.

Mini theaters, a type of independent movie theater characterized by a smaller size and seating capacity in comparison to larger movie theaters, gained popularity during the 1980s. Mini theaters helped bring independent and arthouse films from other countries, as well as films produced in Japan by unknown Japanese filmmakers, to Japanese audiences.

==== Heisei and Reiwa eras ====
Because of economic recessions, the number of movie theaters in Japan had been steadily decreasing since the 1960s. The number of cinemas was under 2,000 in 1993 compared to more than 7,000 in 1960. The 1990s saw the reversal of this trend and the introduction of the multiplex in Japan. At the same time, the popularity of mini theaters continued.

Takeshi Kitano emerged as a significant filmmaker with works such as Sonatine (1993), Kids Return (1996) and Hana-bi (1997), which was given the Golden Lion at the Venice Film Festival. Shōhei Imamura again won the Palme d'Or (shared with Iranian director Abbas Kiarostami), this time for The Eel (1997). He became the fifth two-time recipient, joining Alf Sjöberg, Francis Ford Coppola, Emir Kusturica and Bille August.

Kiyoshi Kurosawa gained international recognition following the release of Cure (1997). Takashi Miike launched a prolific career with titles such as Audition (1999), Dead or Alive (1999) and The Bird People in China (1998). Former documentary filmmaker Hirokazu Koreeda launched an acclaimed feature career with Maborosi (1996) and After Life (1999).

Hayao Miyazaki directed two mammoth box office and critical successes, Porco Rosso (1992) – which beat E.T. the Extra-Terrestrial (1982) as the highest-grossing film in Japan – and Princess Mononoke (1997), which also claimed the top box office spot until Titanic (1997).

Several new anime directors rose to widespread recognition, bringing with them notions of anime as not only entertainment, but modern art. Mamoru Oshii released the internationally acclaimed philosophical science fiction action film Ghost in the Shell in 1996. Satoshi Kon directed the award-winning psychological thriller Perfect Blue. Hideaki Anno also gained considerable recognition with The End of Evangelion in 1997.

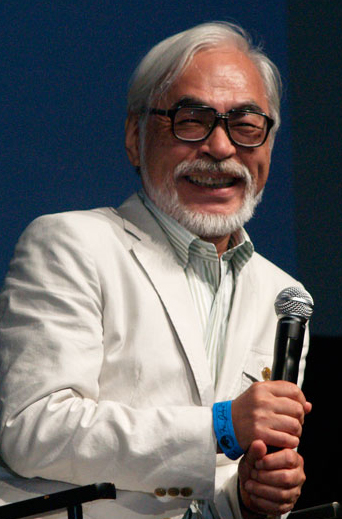
Hayao Miyazaki

In the beginning of 21st century, Japan has been referenced numerous times in popular culture, which was a relatively successful one for Japanese film industry, returning to the idea of a second Japanese New Wave” in their cinematic releases. The country has appeared as a setting and topic multiple times in film, poetry, television, and music. The number of films being shown in Japan steadily increased, with about 821 films released in 2006. Films based on Japanese television series were especially popular during this period. Anime films now accounted for 60 percent of Japanese film production and would become one of the world’s leading producers of animated cinema. The 1990s and 2000s are considered to be "Japanese Cinema's Second Golden Age", due to the immense popularity of anime, both within Japan and overseas.

Although not a commercial success, All About Lily Chou-Chou directed by Shunji Iwai was honored at the Berlin, the Yokohama and the Shanghai Film Festivals in 2001. Takeshi Kitano appeared in Battle Royale and directed and starred in Dolls and Zatoichi. Beginning in the late 1990s, the J-horror film genre began to boom, as films such as Ringu, Kairo, Dark Water, Yogen, the Grudge series and One Missed Call met with commercial success. In 2004, Godzilla: Final Wars, directed by Ryuhei Kitamura, was released to celebrate the 50th anniversary of Godzilla. In 2005, director Seijun Suzuki made his 56th film, Princess Raccoon. Hirokazu Koreeda claimed film festival awards around the world with two of his films Distance and Nobody Knows. Female film director Naomi Kawase's film The Mourning Forest won the Grand Prix at the Cannes Film Festival in 2007. Yoji Yamada, director of the Otoko wa Tsurai yo series, made a trilogy of acclaimed revisionist samurai films, 2002's Twilight Samurai, followed by The Hidden Blade in 2004 and Love and Honor in 2006. In 2008, Departures won the Academy Award for best foreign language film.

In anime, Hayao Miyazaki directed Spirited Away in 2001, breaking Japanese box office records and winning several awards—including the Academy Award for Best Animated Feature in 2003—followed by Howl's Moving Castle and Ponyo in 2004 and 2008 respectively. In 2004, Mamoru Oshii released the anime movie Ghost in the Shell 2: Innocence which received critical praise around the world. His 2008 film The Sky Crawlers was met with similarly positive international reception. Satoshi Kon also released three quieter, but nonetheless highly successful films: Millennium Actress, Tokyo Godfathers, and Paprika. Katsuhiro Otomo released Steamboy, his first animated project since the 1995 short film compilation Memories, in 2004. In collaboration with Studio 4C, American director Michael Arias released Tekkon Kinkreet in 2008, to international acclaim. After several years of directing primarily lower-key live-action films, Hideaki Anno formed his own production studio and revisited his still-popular Evangelion franchise with the Rebuild of Evangelion tetralogy, a new series of films providing an alternate retelling of the original story.

Some Hollywood directors have turned to Tokyo as a backdrop for movies set in Japan. Post-war period examples include Tokyo Joe (1949), My Geisha (1962) and the James Bond film You Only Live Twice (1967). Recent examples include Lost in Translation (2003), The Last Samurai (2003), Kill Bill: Volume 1 (2004), Kill Bill: Volume 2 (2004), The Day After Tomorrow (2004), Memoirs of a Geisha (2005), The Fast and the Furious: Tokyo Drift (2006), Babel (2006), The Day the Earth Stood Still (2008), 2012 (2009), Inception (2010), Emperor (2012), Pacific Rim (2013), The Wolverine (2013), Geostorm (2017), and Avengers: Endgame (2019).

Since February 2000, the Japan Film Commission Promotion Council was established. On November 16, 2001, the Japanese Foundation for the Promotion of the Arts laws were presented to the House of Representatives. These laws were intended to promote the production of media arts, including film scenery, and stipulate that the government – on both the national and local levels – must lend aid in order to preserve film media. The laws were passed on November 30 and came into effect on December 7. In 2003, at a gathering for the Agency of Cultural Affairs, twelve policies were proposed in a written report to allow public-made films to be promoted and shown at the Film Center of the National Museum of Modern Art.

Japanese cinema has always been perceived as either having feminist male directors as well as female directors, furthering the notion of the importance of women in Japanese cinema. This is proven most profusely in 2009, where a symposium for the Nippon Connection Festival was held, which the entire meeting was devoted to women: as a subject, as female directors, and as their importance to Japanese cinema. The impact of women is seen in various film festivals, including ‘Peaches,’ where Japanese women graduates were allowed to display their achievements in the cinematic field willingly. Through these interpretations and diverse views of males in cinema, women have a major impact on Japanese cinema, about politically and socially: they themselves are a part of the Japanese narrative and their stories need to be studied in films for audiences to fully grasp their stories.

Four films have so far received international recognition by being selected to compete in major film festivals: Caterpillar by Kōji Wakamatsu was in competition for the Golden Bear at the 60th Berlin International Film Festival and won the Silver Bear for Best Actress, Outrage by Takeshi Kitano was In Competition for the Palme d'Or at the 2010 Cannes Film Festival, Himizu by Sion Sono was in competition for the Golden Lion at the 68th Venice International Film Festival.

In March 2011, Japanese film and television industry was afflicted by the Tohoku earthquake and tsunami and the subsequent Fukushima nuclear disaster, which was greatly suffered due to ongoing triple disaster. However, many Japanese studios were officially closed or reorganized to prevent the triple disaster. As of result, many of Japanese studios began to reopen and production rates have increased.

In October 2011 (after fully reopening of Japanese film and television industry), Takashi Miike's Hara-Kiri: Death of a Samurai was In Competition for the Palme d'Or at the 2012 Cannes Film Festival, the first 3D film ever to screen In Competition at Cannes. The film was co-produced by British independent producer Jeremy Thomas, who had successfully broken Japanese titles such as Nagisa Oshima's Merry Christmas, Mr Lawrence and Taboo, Takeshi Kitano's Brother, and Miike's 13 Assassins onto the international stage as producer.

In 2018, Hirokazu Kore-eda won the Palme d'Or for his movie Shoplifters at the 71st Cannes Film Festival, a festival that also featured Ryūsuke Hamaguchi's Asako I & II in competition.

The 2020 Japanese epic disaster drama film Fukushima 50, released on March 6, 2020, directed by Setsurō Wakamatsu and written by Yōichi Maekawa. The film is based on the book by Ryusho Kadota, titled On the Brink: The Inside Story of Fukushima Daiichi, and it is the first Japanese film to depict the disaster.

In early 2020, the Japanese media industry was afflicted by the COVID-19 pandemic, which greatly suffered due to health requirements. This gave the nation its worst day of film and television industry impacted by health crises since the end of World War II. From the first (of many) 'health lockdowns' until the end of September 2021, many Japanese studios were closed or reorganized to suit the legal requirements for spread prevention which ultimately resulted in the suspension of filming for many movies, however, it did not stop from people wanting to see movies. Despite this pandemic occurring, many films were slowly being reintroduced to Japanese cinemas, which changed how Japan would approach cinema within the following years. From 2021-2022, there was the reinstating of Japanese cinema to Japanese audiences, as theater attendance had increased from the original 54.5% from 2020, to about 78% by 2022. In 2022 alone, though there was a significant decrease from 2019’s numbers, there were 590 movie theatres that were open and available to the public, allowing for the public to reengage with normal activities while being amid the pandemic.

In October 2020 (after the reopening film industry), a Japanese anime film Demon Slayer: Mugen Train based on the Demon Slayer: Kimetsu no Yaiba manga series broke all box-office records in the country, becoming the highest-grossing film of all time in Japan, the highest-grossing Japanese film of all time and the highest-grossing film of 2020.

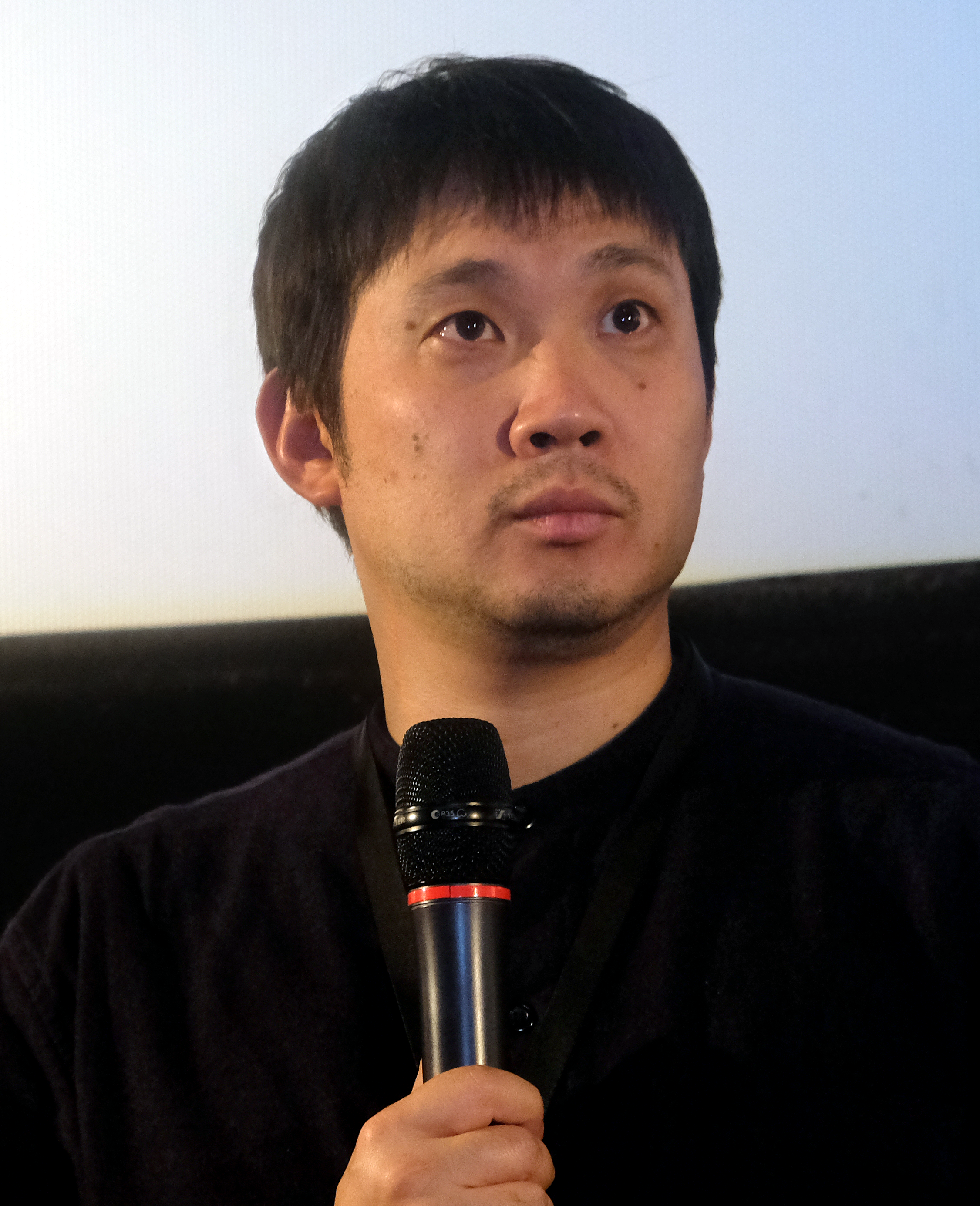
Ryusuke Hamaguchi

In October 2021, a Japanese drama-road film Drive My Car won Best Foreign Language Film at the 79th Golden Globe Awards and received the Academy Award for Best International Feature Film at the 94th Academy Awards.

In May 2023, a Japanese drama film Perfect Days won Best Actor and Ecumenical Jury at the 76th Cannes Film Festival. Besides that a Japanese psychological dramatic mystery thriller film Monster won Best Screenplay as well as the Queer Palm at the same festival.

In September 2023, a Japanese drama mystery film Evil Does Not Exist won Grand Jury and FIPRESCI Award at the 80th Venice International Film Festival and also awarded Best Film at the 2023 BFI London Film Festival.

Hayao Miyazaki's The Boy and the Heron and Takashi Yamazaki's Godzilla Minus One (both released in 2023) each won an award at the 96th Academy Awards and garnered critical acclaim. The Boy and the Heron also won Best Animated Feature Film at the 81st Golden Globe Awards, the first non-English-language animated film to do so. Likewise, Godzilla Minus One became the first foreign-language film to win the Academy Award for Best Visual Effects.

In July 2025, a Japanese anime film Demon Slayer: Kimetsu no Yaiba – The Movie: Infinity Castle based on the Infinity Castle arc of Demon Slayer: Kimetsu no Yaiba manga series broke all box-office records in the country, becoming the highest-grossing film of all time in Japan. It is a direct sequel to the fourth season of the anime television series as well as the manga fourth, fifth, and sixth adaptations, following the film Mugen Train (2020) and the feature-length compilations To the Swordsmith Village (2023) and To the Hashira Training (2024).

== Genres ==
- Anime: animated films
  - Mecha: films featuring mecha robots
- Gendai-geki: films set in the present day, the opposite of jidaigeki
- Japanese horror: horror film
- Japanese science fiction: science fiction film
  - Japanese cyberpunk: cyberpunk films
  - Kaiju: monster films
  - Tokusatsu: films that make heavy use of special effects, usually involving costumed superheroes
- Jidaigeki: period film set during the Edo period (1603–1868) or earlier, the opposite of gendai-geki
  - Samurai cinema: films featuring swordplay, also known as chanbara (an onomatopoeia describing the sound of swords clashing)
- Ninja films: films featuring ninjas
- Pink films: softcore pornographic films
- Shomingeki: realistic films about common working people
- Tendency films: socially conscious, left-leaning films
- Yakuza films: gangster films about yakuza mobsters

== Box office ==
Year	Gross (in billions of yen)	Domestic share	Admissions (in millions)	Source(s)
2009	206	57%	169	
2010	221	54%	174	
2011	181	55%	144.73	
2012	195.2	65.7%	155.16	
2013	194	60.6%	156	
2014	207	58%	161	
2015	217.119	55.4%	166.63	

== See also ==
- Japan Academy Film Prize, hosted by the Nippon Academy-shō Association, is the Japanese equivalent of the Academy Awards.
- Japan Academy Prize
- List of highest-grossing Japanese films
- List of highest-grossing films in Japan
- List of highest-grossing non-English films
- List of Japanese actors
- List of Japanese actresses
- List of Japanese film directors
- List of Japanese films
- Cinema of the world
- History of cinema
  - Genres:
    - List of jidaigeki
    - Samurai cinema
    - Ninja
    - Tokusatsu
- List of Japanese-language films
- List of Japanese movie studios
- List of Japanese submissions for the Academy Award for Best International Feature Film
- Nuberu bagu (The Japanese New Wave)
- Television in Japan
- Voice acting in Japan
- Godzilla
- Studio Ghibli

== Bibliography ==
- Anderson, Joseph L.; Donald Richie (1982). The Japanese Film: Art and Industry (Expanded ed.). Princeton University Press. ISBN 978-0-691-00792-2.
- Baskett, Michael (2008). The Attractive Empire: Transnational Film Culture in Imperial Japan. Honolulu: University of Hawaiʻi Press. ISBN 978-0-8248-3223-0.
- 無声映画鑑賞会 (2001). The Benshi-Japanese Silent Film Narrators. Tokyo: Urban Connections. ISBN 978-4-900849-51-8.
- Bernardi, Joanne (2001). Writing in Light: The Silent Scenario and the Japanese Pure Film Movement. Wayne State University Press. ISBN 978-0-8143-2926-9.
- Berra, John, ed. 2010. Directory of World Cinema: Japan. Bristol: Intellect, Limited. Accessed October 14, 2024. ProQuest Ebook Central. https://ebookcentral.proquest.com/lib/csulb/detail.action?docID=3014871.
- Bingham, Adam. Contemporary Japanese Cinema Since Hana-Bi. 95–119. Edinburgh University Press, 2015. https://www.jstor.org/stable/10.3366/j.ctt16r0hfm.11.
- Bock, Audie (1978). Japanese Film Directors. Kodansha. ISBN 0-87011-304-6.
- Bordwell, David (1988). Ozu and the Poetics of Cinema. Princeton University Press. ISBN 978-0-691-00822-6. Available online at the Center for Japanese Studies, University of Michigan
- Bowyer, Justin, ed. (2004). The Cinema of Japan and Korea. Wallflower Press, London. ISBN 978-1-904764-11-3.
- Burch, Nöel (1979). To the Distant Observer: Form and Meaning in the Japanese Cinema. University of California Press. hdl:2027/spo.aaq5060.0001.001. ISBN 978-0-520-03605-5.
- Cazdyn, Eric (2002). The Flash of Capital: Film and Geopolitics in Japan. Duke University Press. ISBN 978-0-8223-2912-1.
- Córdoba-Arroyo, E. (2024). “From Disenchantment to Glory: Fluctuations in the Memory of World War II in Japanese Cinema (1980–2020).” Memory Studies, 17(4), 923-939. doi:10.1177/17506980231170352
- Desser, David (1988). Eros Plus Massacre: An Introduction to the Japanese New Wave Cinema. Indiana University Press. ISBN 978-0-253-20469-1.
- Dym, Jeffrey A. (2003). Benshi, Japanese Silent Film Narrators, and Their Forgotten Narrative Art of Setsumei: A History of Japanese Silent Film Narration. Lewiston, New York: Edwin Mellen Press. ISBN 978-0-7734-6648-7. (review)
- Furuhata, Yuriko (2013). Cinema of Actuality: Japanese Avant-garde Filmmaking in the Season of Image Politics. Duke University Press. ISBN 978-0-8223-5490-1.
- Gerow, Aaron (2008). A Page of Madness: Cinema and Modernity in 1920s Japan. Center for Japanese Studies, University of Michigan. ISBN 978-1-929280-51-3.
- Gerow, Aaron (2010). Visions of Japanese Modernity: Articulations of Cinema, Nation, and Spectatorship, 1895–1925. University of California Press. ISBN 978-0-520-25456-5.
- High, Peter B. (2003). The Imperial Screen. Wisconsin Studies in Film. The University of Wisconsin Press. ISBN 0-299-18134-0.
- Hirano, Kyoko (1992). Mr. Smith Goes to Tokyo: The Japanese Cinema under the Occupation, 1945–1952. Smithsonian Institution. ISBN 978-1-56098-157-2.
- Japan Community Cinema Center. “Reports of Film Exhibition: Japan Community Cinema Center.” Japan Community Cinema Center | 一般社団法人コミュニティシネマセンター, February 28, 2024. http://jc3.jp/wp/reports-fe/.
- Lamarre, Thomas (2005). Shadows on the Screen: Tanizaki Junʾichirō on Cinema and "Oriental" Aesthetics. Center for Japanese Studies, University of Michigan. ISBN 978-1-929280-32-2.
- Mellen, Joan (1976). The Waves At Genji's Door: Japan Through Its Cinema. Pantheon, New York. ISBN 978-0-394-49799-0.
- Miyao, Daisuke (2013). The Aesthetics of Shadow: Lighting and Japanese Cinema. Durham: Duke University Press. ISBN 978-0-8223-5422-2.
- Miyao, Daisuke, ed. (2014). The Oxford Handbook of Japanese Cinema. Oxford: Oxford University Press. ISBN 978-0-19-973166-4.
- Nolletti, Arthur Jr.; Desser, David, eds. (1992). Reframing Japanese Cinema: Authorship, Genre, History. Indiana University Press. ISBN 978-0-253-34108-2.
- Nornes, Abé Mark (2003). Japanese Documentary Film: The Meiji Era through Hiroshima. Minneapolis: University of Minnesota Press. ISBN 978-0-8166-4045-4.
- Nornes, Abé Mark (2007). Forest of Pressure: Ogawa Shinsuke and Postwar Japanese Documentary. Minneapolis: University of Minnesota Press. ISBN 978-0-8166-4908-2.
- Nornes, Abé Mark; Gerow, Aaron (2009). Research Guide to Japanese Film Studies. Center for Japanese Studies, University of Michigan. ISBN 978-1-929280-53-7.
- Prince, Stephen (1999). The Warrior's Camera. Princeton University Press. ISBN 978-0-691-01046-5.
- Richie, Donald (2005). A Hundred Years of Japanese Film: A Concise History, with a Selective Guide to DVDs and Videos. Kodansha America. ISBN 978-4-7700-2995-9.
- Sato, Tadao (1982). Currents In Japanese Cinema. Kodansha America. ISBN 978-0-87011-815-9.
- Wada-Marciano, Mitsuyo (2008). Nippon Modern: Japanese Cinema of the 1920s and 1930s. University of Hawaii Press. ISBN 978-0-8248-3240-7.
