= Imamura =

Imamura (今村, kanji characters for "now" and "village") is a Japanese surname. Notable people with the surname include:

- Akitsune Imamura (今村 明恒; Kagoshima, 1870-1948), Japanese seismologist
- Ayaka Imamura (born 1993), Japanese voice actress
- Fumihiko Imamura (born 1961), Japanese academic, civil engineer
- Fumio Imamura (born 1966), Japanese race walker
- Imamura Gen’emon (今村 源右衛門; Nagasaki, 1671-1736), notable interpreter
- Genki Imamura (born 1982), Japanese athlete in swimming
- Hiroji Imamura (born 1949), Japanese athlete in football
- Hitoshi Imamura (1886–1968), Japanese Army general during World War II
- Masahiro Imamura (born 1947), Japanese political figure
- Naoki Imamura (born 1973), Japanese voice actor
- Natsuko Imamura (今村 夏子; born 1980), Japanese writer
- Norio Imamura (born 1954), Japanese actor
- Seina Imamura (born 2003), Japanese jockey
- Shikō Imamura (1880–1916), Japanese artist
- Shohei Imamura (1926–2006), Japanese film director
- Shun Imamura (今村 駿; born 1987), Japanese athlete in volleyball
- Taihei Imamura (1911–1986), Japanese film theorist, critic
- Takaya Imamura, Japanese artwork designer for Nintendo
- Takeru Imamura (born 1991), Japanese athlete in baseball
- Takeshi Imamura (1880–1960), Japanese political figure
- Tomio Imamura (born 1958), Japanese athlete in karate
- Yasunori Imamura (born 1953), Japanese musician
- Yemyo Imamura (1867–1932), Japanese Buddhist priest
- Youichi Imamura (born 1976), Japanese professional driver
- Yūka Imamura (born 1993), Japanese athlete in volleyball
- Yuta Imamura (born 1984), Japanese athlete in rugby
