= Akira Iwasaki =

Akira Iwasaki (岩崎昶, Iwasaki Akira) (18 November 1903 – 16 September 1981) was a prominent left-wing Japanese film critic, historian, and producer. Born in Tokyo, he became interested in film from his student days at Tokyo University. Early on, he helped introduce German experimental film in Japan, and was instrumental in getting Teinosuke Kinugasa's masterpiece A Page of Madness screened in Tokyo. Afterward, he became involved in Marxist politics and established a career promoting progressive cinema and criticism. He wrote or edited over thirty books of film criticism, history, theory and biography during his career. He was also involved in film production, first serving from the late 1920s as a central member of the Proletarian Film League of Japan (Prokino), where he acted as not only the theoretical brain of the movement alongside Genjū Sasa, but also as a filmmaker. When Prokino was effectively eliminated by police oppression under the Peace Preservation Law, Iwasaki continued his critical activities, becoming involved in the Yuibutsuron Kenkyūkai with such thinkers as Jun Tosaka, but was eventually arrested in 1940, in part for his opposition to the Film Law, which authorized increased government control of the film industry. He was the only film critic arrested by the ideological police during the war. After his release, he worked for a time at the Tokyo office of the Manchukuo Film Association thanks to the help of Kan'ichi Negishi.

After Japan's defeat in World War II, Iwasaki was active in criticizing those who participated in the war effort. He joined Nihon Eigasha (Nichiei), primarily a documentary film company, and helped produce two important, but ill-fated documentaries: The Effects of the Atomic Bomb on Hiroshima and Nagasaki, which was confiscated by Occupation authorities, and The Japanese Tragedy, directed by Fumio Kamei, which was banned for its critical depiction of Emperor Hirohito. While continuing to work as a film critic from the 1950s on, including pursuing a vigorous debate on the nature of cinematic realism with Taihei Imamura, Iwasaki helped produce some of the independent films made by Tadashi Imai and Satsuo Yamamoto after many left-wingers were expelled from the major studios in the Red Purge.

In 1974, he was a member of the jury at the 24th Berlin International Film Festival.

== Bibliography ==
- Cazdyn, Eric (2002). The Flash of Capital: Film and Geopolitics in Japan. Duke University Press. ISBN 0-8223-2912-3.
- Gerow, Aaron (2008). A Page of Madness: Cinema and Modernity in 1920s Japan. Center for Japanese Studies, University of Michigan. ISBN 978-1-929280-51-3.
- Hirano, Kyoko (1992). Mr. Smith Goes to Tokyo: The Japanese Cinema under the Occupation, 1945–1952. Smithsonian Institution. ISBN 1-56098-157-1.
- Nornes, Abé Mark (2003). Japanese Documentary Film: The Meiji Era through Hiroshima. Minneapolis: University of Minnesota Press. ISBN 0-8166-4045-9.
- Prewar Proletarian Film Movements Collection. Center for Japanese Studies, University of Michigan. Full text of many Prokino publications, including some of Iwasaki's articles.
