= Proletarian Film League of Japan =

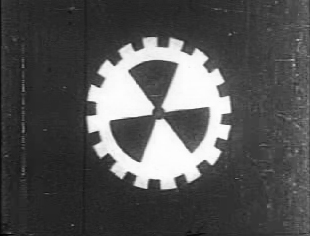
Prokino Symbol

The Proletarian Film League of Japan (日本プロレタリア映画同盟, Nihon Puroretaria Eiga Dōmei), shortened to Prokino, was a left-wing film organization active in the late 1920s and early 1930s in Japan. Associated with the proletarian arts movement in Japan, it primarily used small gauge films such as 16mm film and 9.5mm film to record demonstrations and workers' lives and show them in organized events or, using mobile projection teams, at factories and mines. It also published its own journals. Most of its films were documentaries or newsreels, but Prokino also made fiction films and animated films. Prominent members included Akira Iwasaki and Genjū Sasa, although in its list of supporters one finds such figures as Daisuke Itō, Kenji Mizoguchi, Shigeharu Nakano, Tomoyoshi Murayama, Kiyohiko Ushihara, Kogo Noda, Takiji Kobayashi, Sōichi Ōya, Fuyuhiko Kitagawa, Tokihiko Okada, Matsuo Kishi, Kiyoshi Miki, Denmei Suzuki, Teppei Kataoka, and Shigeyoshi Suzuki. The movement was eventually suppressed by the police under the Peace Preservation Law, but many former members became prominent figures in the Japanese documentary and fiction film industries.

== See also ==
- Workers Film and Photo League (USA)
