= Cine film =

Film format

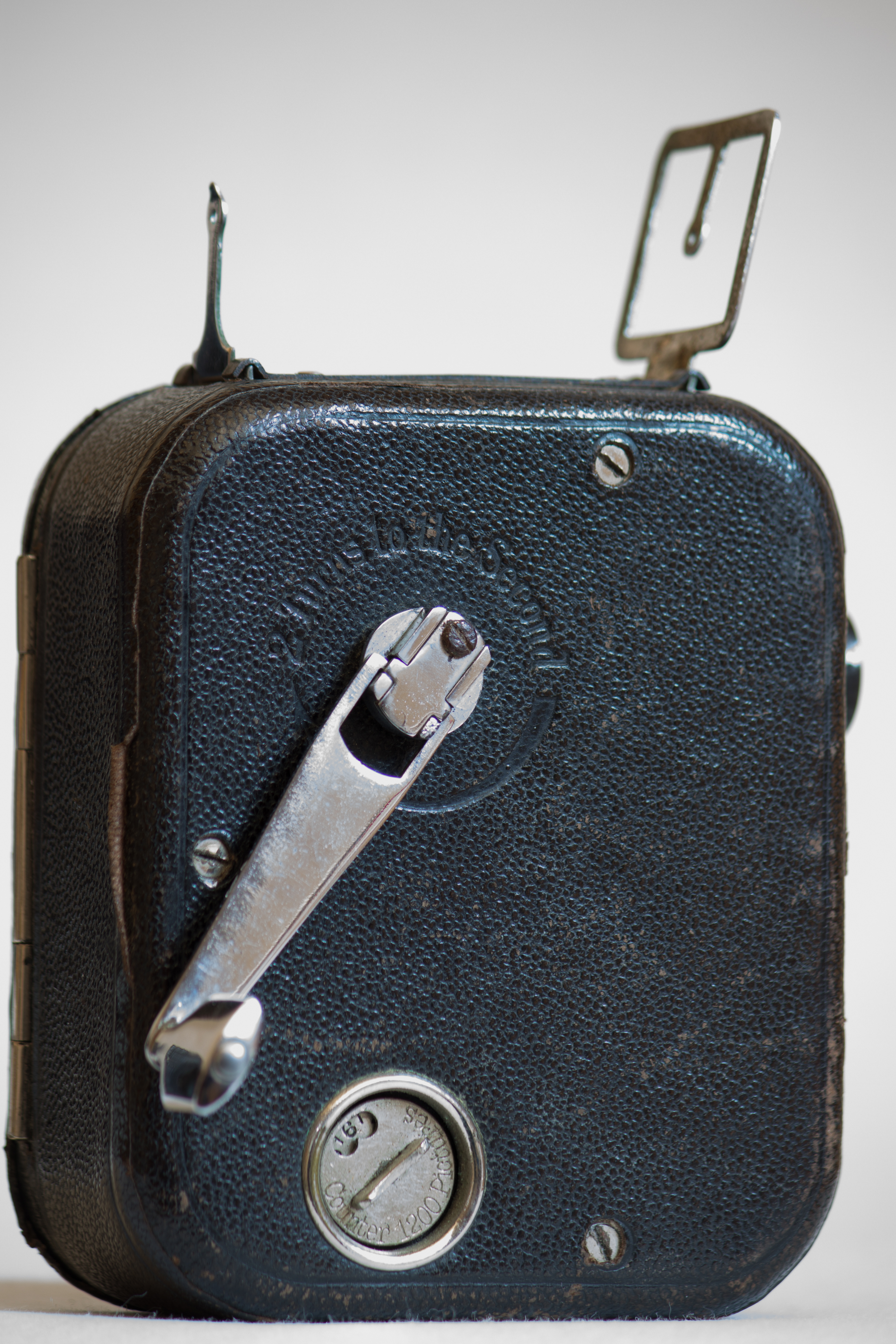
Pathé-Baby 9.5 mm movie camera of 1923, known in Britain as a cine camera

Ciné film or cine film is the term commonly used in the UK and historically in the US to refer to the 8 mm, Super 8, 9.5 mm, and 16 mm motion picture film formats used for home movies. It is not normally used to refer to professional formats such as 35 mm or 70 mm film, and is incorrect if applied to any video format. In the US, "movie film" is the common informal term for all formats and "motion picture film" the formal one.

Cine film literally means "moving" film, deriving from the Greek "kine" for motion; it also has roots in the Anglo-French word cinematograph, meaning moving picture.

Although there had been earlier attempts, typically employing larger formats, the introduction of the 9.5 mm and 16 mm formats in the early 1920s finally succeeded in introducing the practice of showing rented "play-at-home" copies of professionally made films, which, in the case of feature-length films, were usually much shortened from the originals.

More significantly, these new cine film gauges were the first truly practical formats for making casual amateur "home movies" of vacation trips, family gatherings, and important events such as weddings. Amateur dramas and comedies were sometimes filmed, usually just for fun and without any aspiration to artistic merit. On occasion, professional filmmakers employed cine film for cost-saving reasons, or to evoke a particular aesthetic effect.

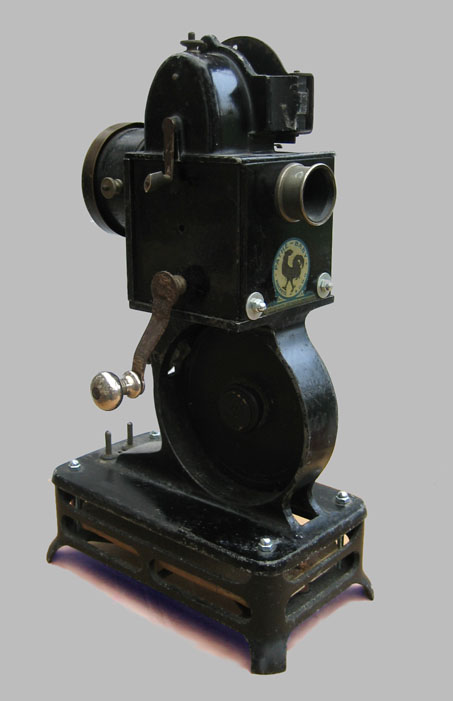
Pathe Baby movie projector for film format 9.5 mm cine film from 1924

Amateur 16 mm film-making was an expensive hobby limited to the affluent. The 9.5 mm format made more efficient use of film and was not quite so costly. The 8 mm format, introduced in 1932, consumed only one-quarter as much film as 16 mm and finally made home movies a reasonably affordable luxury for the many. Eventually, the 16 mm format came to be used mostly for commercial, educational and industrial purposes as a cost-cutting, compact alternative to 35 mm film that produced an acceptably sharp and bright image on smaller screens.

Cine film, being commonly available, was also used to record scientific data, such as observations of animal behaviour and human gait. In some cases, such as studies of fluid dynamics, recording was done onto cine film at higher speeds than those used in home movies.

In the mid-1970s, Betamax and VHS home videocassette recorders were introduced. Color video cameras, previously beyond the financial reach of all but the richest amateurs, gradually became cheaper and smaller. Battery-powered camcorders combined the recorder and the camera into one portable and increasingly compact and affordable unit. By the early 1980s an hour of blank videotape cost no more than a three-minute 50-foot roll of 8 mm film, in substantial part because of costs associated with the latter's chemical processing. The writing was on the wall for cine film as a mass market item, though even in the early 2010s all the film formats mentioned above were still supported with new film stock and processing, albeit only from a very few specialist suppliers.

Since cine film is now an obsolete format, some companies offer a service whereby these films are converted to modern formats such as DVD, and hobbyists have devised ways of performing the transfer with do-it-yourself equipment.
