= Shiro Asano (cameraman) =

Japanese cinematographer

- Born: 1877
- Died: 1955 (aged 77–78)
- Occupations: Photographer, cinematographer, makeup artist

Shiro Asano (浅野四郎, 1877–1955) was a cameraman during the early days of Japanese cinema. He is known primarily for his work using imported versions of the Lumiere kinetoscope and the Gaumont camera, as well as his contributions to the horror genre with his short films. He is also regarded as one of the first Japanese people to host a public film screening.

== Early career ==
Asano was hired at the Konoshi Photography Store in his late teens or early twenties. When the Konoshi Photography Store received imports of the Lumiere kinetoscope and a camera believed to be invented by either Gaumont or Baxter, the Konoshi Photography Store changed their brand name to Sakura and entrusted Asano, who was working as an assistant in the store at the time, to create magic with these new devices.

Asano started his cinematography career by filming basic scenes such as: the happenings in the streets of Japan such as: vehicles and people moving along the street, trains in motion, and the Kakubeijishi (or lion dance). He also filmed dancing geisha, which was what he was most known for during this early period of Japanese film production. When speaking to a Japanese newspaper, he recalled his time filming the dancing geisha by stating:

"At Hanatsuki in Shimbashi, we filmed the ‘Tsurukame dance…I was not just the filmmaker, I helped the geisha with their makeup. Their standard makeup was no good for the camera. I think of myself back then, twenty-one years old and sound in wind and limb. I looked at my watch and began."

He then shifted his career into making short films. His two most notable works are the horror short film Bake-Jizo and a comedy short film called Shinin no Sosei, which were both released in 1898. He also was one of the first Japanese people to host a public film screening in Japan.

== Thoughts on the early film industry ==
Through his time filming the streets of Japan and dancing geisha, he learned about frame rates. While learning about frame rates, Asano shared major concerns about the camera that he was using filming at 21 frames per second, when the standard in Japan at the time would have been a maximum of 16 frames per second.

== Filmography ==
Bake-Jizo (Jizo the Spook), 1898

Shinin no sosei (Resurrection of a Corpse), 1898
