= Matsuo Kishi =

Matsuo Kishi (岸松雄, Kishi Matsuo) (18 September 1906 – 17 August 1985) was a Japanese film critic, director, screenwriter, producer, and biographer. His real name was Aji Shūichirō. Born in Tokyo, he became interested in film from his days in high school and, continuing to Keio University, began submitting reviews to magazines such as Kinema Junpo and editing theater programs. Starting a dōjinshi Eiga kaihō with Tsuneo Hazumi, Kishi became involved in the left-wing film movement of the late 1920s, eventually becoming a member of the Proletarian Film League of Japan (Prokino). He soon left due to dissatisfaction with such a political approach to film. In 1932, he became the first critic to champion the work of Sadao Yamanaka, and later was a strong supporter of the films of Hiroshi Shimizu. In 1937, he gave up being a film critic and became an assistant director at Toho, where he directed one film— Kazaguruma, in 1938— before concentrating on screenwriting. After the war, he mainly worked at Shintoho, serving as producer on a few films, and wrote scripts for such directors as Shimizu and Mikio Naruse. All along he continued writing on film, especially penning numerous biographical accounts of the many people he knew in the Japanese film world.
