= Yasunosuke Gonda =

Yasunosuke Gonda 権田保之助
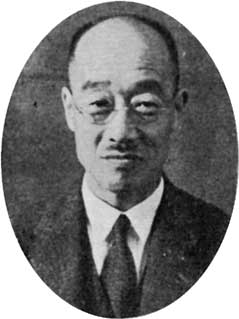
- Born: May 17, 1887; Kanda, Tokyo
- Died: January 5, 1951 (aged 63)
- Occupation: Sociologist
- Known for: Popular culture studies

Yasunosuke Gonda (権田保之助, Gonda Yasunosuke) (17 May 1887 – 5 January 1951) was a Japanese sociologist and film theorist who played an important role in the study of popular entertainment and helped pioneer statistical studies of everyday life in Japan.

== Career ==
Born in the Kanda area of Tokyo, Gonda was early attracted to the socialism of Isoo Abe, and his early political activities earned expulsion from Waseda High School. He later studied at Tokyo University of Foreign Studies and Tokyo University where he was influenced by German statistical sociology. His first book, The Principles and Applications of the Moving Pictures (Katsudō shashin no genri oyobi ōyō), was published in 1914, and was the first full-length monograph in Japan studying the medium of cinema. His later research on lower class life and popular play focused on how popular culture was generated from the bottom up and challenged top-down notions of national or modern culture.

== Selected bibliography ==
- Gonda, Yasunosuke (1974–1975). Gonda Yasunosuke chosakushū (in Japanese). Bunwa Shobō.
- Gonda, Yasunosuke (December 2010). "The Principles and Applications of the Moving Pictures (Excerpts)". Review of Japanese Culture and Society. 22: 24–36. JSTOR 42800637.
