= 9.5 mm film =

Amateur film format

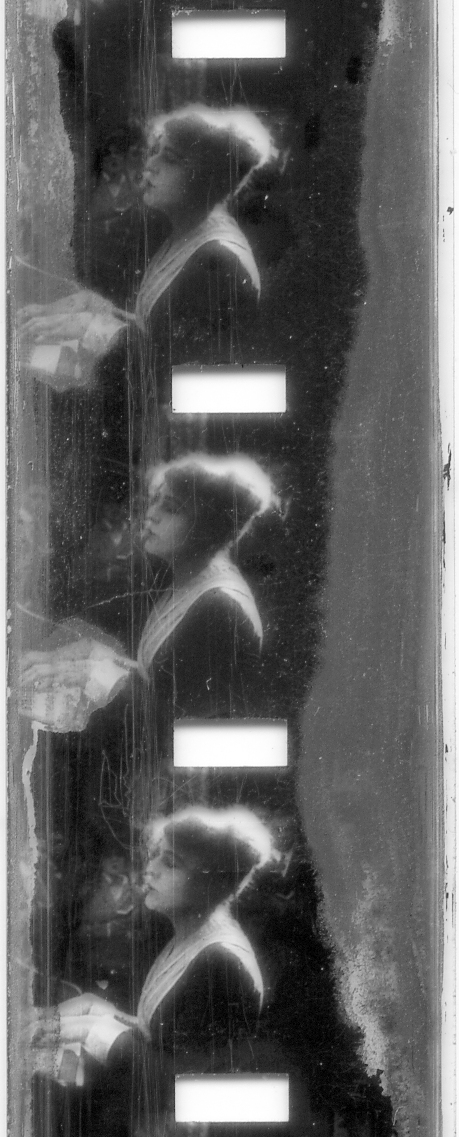
Three frames of 9.5 mm film showing central sprocket holes

9.5 mm film is an amateur film format introduced by Pathé in 1922 as part of the Pathé Baby amateur film system. It was conceived initially as an inexpensive format to provide copies of commercially made films to home users, although a simple camera was released shortly afterwards.

It became very popular in Europe over the next few decades and is still used by a small number of enthusiasts today. Over 300,000 projectors were produced and sold mainly in France and England, and many commercial features were available in the format.

== Format ==
The format makes use of a single, central perforation (sprocket hole) between each pair of frames, as opposed to 8 mm film, which has perforations along one edge, and most other film formats, which have perforations on each side of the image. The single hole allowed more of the film to be used for the actual image, and in fact the image area is almost the same size as 16 mm film. The perforation in the film is invisible to viewers, as the intermittent shutter blocks the light as the film is pulled through the gate to the next frame.

When discontinued in 1927, 9.5 mm strips were cut from 35 mm film.

The projection system also incorporated a way to save film on non-moving titles. A notch in the film was recognised by the projector, which would then project the second frame after it for 3 seconds. By this method, 3 seconds of screen time was available for 1 frame of film, rather than the 42 frames required if the film was projected at the normal rate (which was 14 fps at the very beginning, then it became 16 fps). The same principle was used by the 'Agfa Family' system of Super 8 camera and projector in 1981 though to provide still images rather than titles.

== Pathéscope ==
In Britain, 9.5 mm film, projectors and cameras were distributed by Pathéscope Ltd. During the years leading up to the Second World War, and for some years after the war, the gauge was used by enthusiasts who wanted to make home movies and to show commercially made films at home. Pathéscope produced a large number of home versions of significant films, including Mickey Mouse and Betty Boop cartoons, classic features such as Alfred Hitchcock's Blackmail, and comedies by such well-known stars as Laurel and Hardy and Chaplin. A notable element in the Pathéscope catalogue was pre-war German mountain films by such directors as G. W. Pabst and Leni Riefenstahl. Classics such as Fritz Lang's Metropolis, The Cabinet of Dr. Caligari and Dupont's Vaudeville attracted many film collectors.

Film for home cinematography was usually supplied in rolls approximately 30 feet (9 m) long and enclosed in a "charger" or magazine, but spool loading (50 ft/15 m or 100 ft/30 m) was also available. Pre-war the most popular film was Ortho reversal costing only about 4 shillings and 6 pence per charger. After the war Panchromatic film became more usual, and around 1953 even Kodachrome I became available, though it took weeks to get it processed in Paris. Pathéscope Colour Film (actually made by Ferrania) was introduced in the 1950s. A number of cameras and projectors were produced, the more successful including the Pathéscope H camera and Gem projector. Optical sound was introduced for 9.5 mm in 1938, but efforts to produce a library of sound films were interrupted by the War. The optical track resulted in a rather square frame format for the picture.

After the war, the 9.5 mm gauge suffered strong competition from Kodak's 8 mm film, which was introduced in 1932. Notwithstanding the far poorer resolution of the 8 mm frame, which could hold only about a quarter of the information of the 9.5 mm or 16 mm frame, 8 mm was taken up by a wider public, partly because of the commercial power of its sponsors and the much lower cost of Kodachrome processed in England. Pathéscope found itself struggling to hold its place in the market, and in 1959 there was a workers' buy-out and name change to Pathéscope (Great Britain) Ltd., with links to French Pathé being broken. The new company produced a well-made 9.5 mm Prince camera made in England by Smiths Industries and a low-powered Princess projector, but the gauge was already doomed as a popular format, and in 1960 the firm went into liquidation. Nevertheless, the gauge has been kept alive by a dedicated group of enthusiasts who have used methods such as re-perforating 16 mm film to provide continued supplies of material. The Ciné-Club 9,5 de France provides modern 9.5 mm film stock. Several 9.5 clubs still exist in various countries and 9.5 festivals are held each year, the most famous is the Calella festival.

== Problems ==
The central perforation of 9.5 mm film cannot be supported in the gate of camera or projector in the same way that 8 or 16 mm perforations are. Much damage was caused to 9.5 mm prints by early cheap toy projectors which lacked the customary sprocket drive requiring the pull-down claw to do all the work of transporting the film. Many very old 9.5 mm films are however still in good condition.

A further problem was that the film had to be passed through continuous processing machines slowly. The sprocket caused turbulence (the same effect as over agitation) to the developer immediately adjacent to the sprocket hole which resulted in that portion of the frame becoming overdeveloped (which manifested itself on the projected frame as over exposure). The filmstock is still processed today (in the UK and in France) [By whom?].

== Technical specifications ==
Diagram showing dimensions of 9.5 mm film

- Film width: 9.5 mm (0.374 in)
- Camera aperture: 8.5×6.5 mm (0.335×0.256 in) W×H
- Projected image: 8.20×6.15 mm (0.323×0.242 in) W×H
- Image area: 55.25 mm²
- vertical pulldown
- 1 central perforation per frame, 2.4×1.0 mm (0.0945×0.0394 in) W×H
- 7.54 mm (0.297 in) perforation pitch
- 135.1 frames per metre
- 30 m (98 ft) = approx. 4 minutes at 16 f.p.s.
- Soundtrack: magnetic or optical 1 mm wide
- Optical Sound-Image frame interval: 26 frames
- Magnetic Sound-Image frame interval: 28 frames

== The format's centenary ==
In 2022 and 2023, a range of activities took place to celebrate the centenary of the 9.5mm film format: conferences, blogs, film productions, collection showcases, publications etc. More information regarding these resources is available at:

- http://en.inedits-europe.org/9.5mm-Centenary
- https://lichtspiel.ch/en/9-5
- https://lichtspiel.ch/en/symposium-2/9-5
- https://www.fondation-jeromeseydoux-pathe.com/event/309
- https://sites.google.com/view/100yearsof95mmconference/home
- https://toyfilm-museum.jp/blog/?s=9.5%E3%8E%9C
- https://www.fondazionedivenezia.org/archivio-attivita/ininfiammabile
- https://www.archivioaperto.it/programmi/verso-il-centenario
- https://www.centroculturadigital.mx/actividad/centenario
- https://nineandahalffilm.wordpress.com/about-2

== See also ==
- Cine
- Film
- List of film formats
- Movie projector
