= Genjū Sasa =

Genjū Sasa (佐々元十, Sasa Genjū) (14 January 1900 – 7 July 1959) was a left-wing Japanese film director and film critic. He was a founding member of the Proletarian Film League of Japan (Prokino), providing inspiration to the movement through his writings and his films.

== Bibliography ==
- Makino, Mamoru. "Rethinking the Emergence of the Proletarian Film League of Japan (Prokino)." In Praise of Film Studies: Essays in Honor of Makino Mamoru. Eds. Aaron Gerow and Abé Mark Nornes (Kinema Club, 2001).
- Nornes, Abé Mark (2003). Japanese Documentary Film: The Meiji Era through Hiroshima. Minneapolis: University of Minnesota Press. ISBN 0-8166-4045-9.
- Prewar Proletarian Film Movements Collection. Center for Japanese Studies, University of Michigan. Full text of many Prokino publications, including some of Sasa's articles.
