= Heiichi Sugiyama =

- 杉山 平一
- Born: 2 November 1914; Fukushima Prefecture
- Died: 19 May 2012 (aged 97); Hyogo Prefecture
- Occupations: poet, film critic

Heiichi Sugiyama (Japanese: 杉山 平一, Hepburn: Sugiyama Heiichi; 2 November 1914 – 19 May 2012) was a Japanese poet, film critic, and film theorist.

== Career ==
Born the son of a wealthy engineer in Fukushima Prefecture, Sugiyama studied art history at the University of Tokyo, and it was at that time that he was discovered by the poet Tatsuji Miyoshi. After graduating, he founded the literary journal Osaka bungaku with Sakunosuke Oda. He won the Nakahara Chuya Prize in 1941 and the Bungei Panron Prize in 1943 for his poetry. His father's factory, however, burned down during World War II and Sugiyama had to give up his creative activities in order to rebuild the family business, an endeavor that ended in failure in 1956 when the company had to declare bankruptcy after a series of labor conflicts and natural disasters. It took him 24 years to publish his second book of poetry. His poetry has been termed "short and crisp, witty, more visual than musical, philosophical and even metaphysical – without losing touch with day-to-day reality." He won the Gendai Shijin Award at age 97 in March 2012, two months before his death of pneumonia.

It was said that Sugiyama "spent his life between cinema and poetry". His poetry revealed "the eye of a cinematographer" and his first book, published in 1941, was on film. As a film theorist, he praised the long take and critiqued film montage before André Bazin did.

From 1966, he was a professor at Tezukayama Gakuin College.
