= Taihei Imamura =

Japanese film theorist (1911–1986)

Taihei Imamura (今村 太平, Imamura Taihei; 21 August 1911 – 26 February 1986) was a Japanese film critic and film theorist. Born in Saitama Prefecture, he attended the Kobe University of Commerce (the precursor to Kobe University) but left before graduating. In 1935 he helped found the film dojinshi Eiga shūdan (Film Collective). Writing from a left-wing perspective, he was a strong advocate of the realistic aspects of cinema and thus a champion of documentary film. He was also the first in Japan to pursue an extensive study of animated film. After World War II, he became the publisher of the journals Eiga bunka (Film Culture) and Eizō bunka (Image Culture). In his later years, he penned a study of the novelist Naoya Shiga. He published over 27 books during his career. Underlining how Imamura was a unique figure in the history of Japanese film theory, Heiichi Sugiyama subtitled his autobiography of Imamura, "A solitary and original critic of the image".

Anime directors such as Isao Takahata have expressed their debt to Imamura. Studio Ghibli republished his book on animation, Manga eigaron, in 2005 with an essay from Takahata titled "What I Learned from Imamura Taihei."

== Selected publications ==
- Imamura, Taihei (2005). Manga eigaron. Jiburi Library (in Japanese) (Reprint based on 1992 Iwanami Shoten ed.). Tokyo: Tokuma Shoten. ISBN 978-4-19-862100-1.
- Imamura, Taihei (December 2010). "A Theory of the Animated Sound Film". Review of Japanese Culture and Society. 22: 44–51.
- Imamura, Taihei (December 2010). "A Theory of Film Documentary". Review of Japanese Culture and Society. 22: 52–59.
