= Kinema Junpo Award for Best Film of the Year =

Japanese film award

- Awarded for: Best Feature Film of the Year
- Country: Japan
- Presented by: Kinema Junpo
- First award: 1926
- Most recent winner: Two Seasons, Two Strangers (2025)
- Website: http://www.kinejun.com/

The Kinema Junpo Award for Best Film of the Year, also called the Kinema Junpo Best Ten Award for Best Japanese Film, is given by Japanese film magazine Kinema Junpo as part of its annual Kinema Junpo Best Ten awards. Each film selected into the Japanese Film Best Ten list receives an award, the highest ranked one becoming Best Japanese Film accordingly. The award was first given for 1926. Here is a list of the award winners.

== Winners ==
Year	Film (s)	Japanese title	Director
1926	The Woman Who Touched the Legs	足にさはった女	Yutaka Abe
1927	A Diary of Chuji's Travels (Parts I-II)	忠次旅日記	Daisuke Itō
1928	The Street of Masterless Samurai/Beautiful Conquest	旋風児	Masahiro Makino
1929	Beheading Place	明烏夢泡雪	Masahiro Makino
1930 (Note: For 1930, separate lists were made for "modern films" and "historical films".)	What Made Her Do It? (modern film) & Ooka's Trial (historical film)	何が彼女をそうさせたか & 新版大岡政談	Shigeyoshi Suzuki & Daisuke Itō
1931	The Neighbor's Wife and Mine	マダムと女房	Heinosuke Gosho
1932	I Was Born, But...	大人の見る絵本 生れてはみたけれど	Yasujirō Ozu
1933	Passing Fancy	出来ごころ	Yasujirō Ozu
1934	A Story of Floating Weeds	浮草物語	Yasujirō Ozu
1935	Wife! Be Like a Rose!	妻よ薔薇のやうに	Mikio Naruse
1936	Sisters of the Gion	祇園の姉妹	Kenji Mizoguchi
1937	Limitless Advance	限りなき前進	Tomu Uchida
1938	Five Scouts	五人の斥候兵	Tomotaka Tasaka
1939	Tsuchi	土	Tomu Uchida
1940	Spring on Leper's Island	小島の春	Shirō Toyoda
1941	The Brothers and Sisters of the Toda Family	戸田家の兄妹	Yasujirō Ozu
1942	The War at Sea from Hawaii to Malaya	ハワイ・マレー沖海戦	Kajirō Yamamoto
1946	Morning for the Osone Family	大曾根家の朝	Keisuke Kinoshita
1947	The Ball at the Anjo House	安城家の舞踏会	Kōzaburō Yoshimura
1948	Drunken Angel	酔いどれ天使	Akira Kurosawa
1949	Late Spring	晩春	Yasujirō Ozu
1950	Until We Meet Again	また逢う日まで	Tadashi Imai
1951	Early Summer	麦秋	Yasujirō Ozu
1952	Ikiru	生きる	Akira Kurosawa
1953	An Inlet of Muddy Water	にごりえ	Tadashi Imai
1954	Twenty-Four Eyes	二十四の瞳	Keisuke Kinoshita
1955	Floating Clouds	浮雲	Mikio Naruse
1956	Darkness at Noon	真昼の暗黒	Tadashi Imai
1957	The Rice People	米	Tadashi Imai
1958	The Ballad of Narayama	楢山節考	Keisuke Kinoshita
1959	Kiku to Isamu	キクとイサム	Tadashi Imai
1960	Her Brother	おとうと	Kon Ichikawa
1961	Bad Boys	不良少年	Susumu Hani
1962	Being Two Isn't Easy	私は二歳	Kon Ichikawa
1963	The Insect Woman	にっぽん昆虫記	Shohei Imamura
1964	The Woman in the Dunes	砂の女	Hiroshi Teshigahara
1965	Red Beard	赤ひげ	Akira Kurosawa
1966	The Great White Tower	白い巨塔	Satsuo Yamamoto
1967	Samurai Rebellion	上意討ち 拝領妻始末	Masaki Kobayashi
1968	The Profound Desire of the Gods	神々の深き欲望	Shōhei Imamura
1969	Double Suicide	心中天網島	Masahiro Shinoda
1970	Where Spring Comes Late	家族	Yoji Yamada
1971	The Ceremony	儀式	Nagisa Oshima
1972	The Long Darkness	忍ぶ川	Kei Kumai
1973	Tsugaru Folk Song	津軽じょんがら節	Kōichi Saitō
1974	Sandakan No. 8	サンダカン八番娼館 望郷	Kei Kumai
1975	Kenji Mizoguchi: The Life of a Film Director	ある映画監督の生涯 溝口健二の記録	Kaneto Shindo
1976	The Youth Killer	青春の殺人者	Kazuhiko Hasegawa
1977	The Yellow Handkerchief	幸福の黄色いハンカチ	Yoji Yamada
1978	Third Base	サード	Yōichi Higashi
1979	Vengeance Is Mine	復讐するは我にあり	Shōhei Imamura
1980	Zigeunerweisen	ツィゴイネルワイゼン	Seijun Suzuki
1981	Muddy River	泥の河	Kōhei Oguri
1982	Fall Guy	蒲田行進曲	Kinji Fukasaku
1983	The Family Game	家族ゲーム	Yoshimitsu Morita
1984	The Funeral	お葬式	Juzo Itami
1985	And Then	それから	Yoshimitsu Morita
1986	The Sea and Poison	海と毒薬	Kei Kumai
1987	A Taxing Woman	マルサの女	Juzo Itami
1988	My Neighbor Totoro	となりのトトロ	Hayao Miyazaki
1989	Black Rain	黒い雨	Shohei Imamura
1990	The Cherry Orchard	櫻の園	Shun Nakahara
1991	My Sons	息子	Yōji Yamada
1992	Sumo Do, Sumo Don't	シコふんじゃった。	Masayuki Suo
1993	All Under the Moon	月はどっちに出ている	Yōichi Sai
1994	A Dedicated Life	全身小説家	Kazuo Hara
1995	A Last Note	午後の遺言状	Kaneto Shindo
1996	Shall We Dance?	Shall we ダンス?	Masayuki Suo
1997	The Eel	うなぎ	Shohei Imamura
1998	Fireworks	はなび	Takeshi Kitano
1999	Wait and See	あ、春	Shinji Sōmai
2000	Face	顔	Junji Sakamoto
2001	Go	ゴー	Isao Yukisada
2002	The Twilight Samurai	たそがれ清兵衛	Yōji Yamada
2003	A Boy's Summer in 1945	美しい夏キリシマ	Kazuo Kuroki
2004	Nobody Knows	誰も知らない	Hirokazu Kore-eda
2005	Break Through!	박치기,パッチギ!	Kazuyuki Izutsu
2006	Hula Girls	フラガール	Lee Sang-il
2007	I Just Didn't Do It	それでもボクはやってない	Masayuki Suo
2008	Departures	おくりびと	Yōjirō Takita
2009	Dear Doctor	ディア・ドクター	Miwa Nishikawa
2010	Villain	悪人	Lee Sang-il
2011	Postcard	一枚のハガキ	Kaneto Shindo
2012	Our Homeland	かぞくのくに	Yang Yong-hi
2013	Pecoross' Mother and Her Days	ペコロスの母に会いに行く	Azuma Morisaki
2014	The Light Shines Only There	そこのみにて光輝く	Mipo O
2015	Three Stories of Love	恋人たち	Ryōsuke Hashiguchi
2016	In This Corner of the World	この世界の片隅に	Sunao Katabuchi
2017	The Tokyo Night Sky Is Always the Densest Shade of Blue	夜空はいつでも最高密度の青色だ	Yuya Ishii
2018	Shoplifters	万引き家族	Hirokazu Kore-eda
2019	It Feels So Good	火口のふたり	Haruhiko Arai
2020	Wife of a Spy	スパイの妻	Kiyoshi Kurosawa
2021	Drive My Car	ドライブ・マイ・カー	Ryusuke Hamaguchi
2022	Small, Slow But Steady	ケイコ 目を澄ませて	Shō Miyake
2023	Okiku and the World	せかいのおきく	Junji Sakamoto
2024	All the Long Nights	夜明けのすべて	Shō Miyake
2025	Two Seasons, Two Strangers	旅と日々	Shō Miyake
