= Nagamasa Kawakita =

Japanese entrepreneur and film producer (1903–1981)

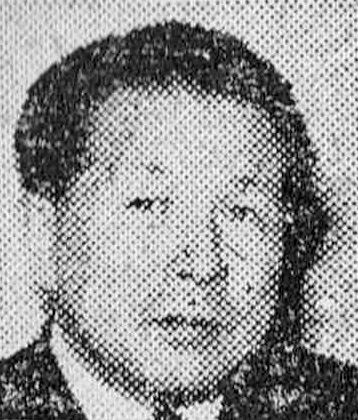
- Kawakita. 1952
- Born: April 20, 1903; Tokyo, Japan
- Died: May 24, 1981 (aged 78)
- Occupations: Entrepreneur; film producer; importer

Nagamasa Kawakita (川喜多長政, Kawakita Nagamasa; April 20, 1903 – May 24, 1981) was a Japanese entrepreneur, film producer and importer. Together with his wife Kashiko Kawakita and daughter Kazuko Kawakita, he was instrumental in the development of the Japanese film industry, sponsoring actors and actresses, and in promoting Japanese cinema to overseas audiences.

== Biography ==
=== Early life ===
Kawakita was born in Tokyo. His father, Kawakita Daijiro, a highly decorated officer in the Imperial Japanese Army during the Russo-Japanese War, and subsequently an instructor at the Baoding Military Academy in Beijing, was killed under mysterious circumstances, possibly for treason by Japanese agents. Following graduation from high school in Japan, Kawakita travelled to China in 1922 to study at Beijing University and continued on to Heidelberg in Germany for further studies. He was hired by the German movie company Universum Film AG and sent back to Japan as its representative.

=== Pre-war career ===
Kawakita formed his own company, Towa Shoji G.K. (lit. "Towa Trading Limited Partnership", now Toho-Towa) in October 1928. He met his wife, Kashiko, when she came to work at the company as his secretary, and they used their honeymoon in 1932 to make the first of many trips to Europe to acquire movies for the Japanese market. Among his earliest successes were Leontine Sagan's Mädchen in Uniform, although he also worked with many other European directors, including G. W. Pabst, René Clair, Fritz Lang and Julien Duvivier. The films Kawakita imported were released to the market via Toho Studios. Kawakita also brought Japanese films to the Venice Film Festival and other overseas venues.

In 1937, he played an important role in the 1937 German-Japanese joint venture The Daughter of the Samurai, directed by Arnold Fanck and Mansaku Itami. In the 1938 Venice International Film Festival, Five Scouts (Gonin no sekkōhei) by Tomotaka Tasaka was nominated best film, the first time a Japanese film had won a major award at an overseas film festival.

In 1938, Kawakita, who was fluent in Chinese as well as in German, turned his attention to China, working on a Sino-Japanese joint venture, The Road to Peace in the Orient, directed by Shigeyoshi Suzuki, investing much of his own capital in a project which he hoped would project Sino-Japanese harmony. However, the film was a commercial failure as the Chinese public say Kawakita as a mouthpiece of the Japanese military and the Japanese found the Chinese language movie with Japanese subtitled hard to understand. The Japanese Army then asked Kawakita to head the newly formed China United Productions Ltd. (or "Zhonglian" for short); a merger between Xinhua Film Company and eleven other Shanghai studios. Kawakita initially hesitated, but realized that the project would proceed with or without him. The studio produced movies with local staff and actors aimed at local Chinese audiences, and had a staff of over 3000 employees. Although Kawakita maintained relations with high-ranking officials in the Japanese military and the Nanjing Nationalist government (Shanghai mayor Chen Gongbo as honorary president), he insisted that the company act independently and to continue to pursue entertainment themes over propaganda, and thus often encountered opposition from Japanese censors and military officials, so much so that there were rumors of a plot by the Kwantung Army or of the Kempeitai to assassinate him.

== Post-war career ==
After the surrender of Japan, Kawakita returned to Japan, where he was arrested by the American occupation forces and charged as a Class-B war criminal; however, he was soon released after the authorities received many statements in his defense from Chinese and Jews he had protected while in Shanghai.

He was permitted to resume his position as president of Towa Trading in 1950, and changed the company name to Toho-Towa in 1951. He continued to make efforts to promote Japanese cinema overseas, and screened Rashomon by Akira Kurosawa at the Venice Film Festival in 1951 where it won the Golden Lion award. He was production supervisor for the 1953 American-Japanese joint venture Anatahan, directed by Josef von Sternberg.

In 1960, Kawakita established the Japan Film Library Council to promote Japanese cinema overseas and to make materials available to foreign researchers. He also was a founder of the Japan Art Theatre Guild, to promote international art film to Japan. His daughter, Kazuko Kawakita became an assistant to Akira Kurosawa on the 1960 film The Bad Sleep Well. She later married actor Juzo Itami.

Kawakita was awarded the Order of the Sacred Treasures, 2nd class, in 1973. He died on May 24, 1981.

Following his death, the Kawakita Award was created in 1983 to honor individuals or organizations who have contributed to the promotion of Japanese cinema overseas. Its first recipient was Donald Richie. His former home in Kamakura, Kanagawa, Japan has been turned into a memorial museum.
