= Tendency film =

Socially conscious and left-leaning Japanese film genre

Tendency film (傾向映画, keikō-eiga) was a genre of socially conscious, left-leaning films produced in Japan during the 1920s and 1930s. Tendency films reflected a perceived leftward shift in Japanese society in the aftermath of the 1927 Shōwa financial crisis. Notable examples of the genre are Tomu Uchida's A Living Puppet (1929), Kenji Mizoguchi's Tokyo March and Metropolitan Symphony (both 1929), Tomotaka Tasaka's Behold This Mother (1930), and Shigeyoshi Suzuki's What Made Her Do It? (1930).

== History and themes ==
Tendency films were melodramas aimed at the mainstream commercial market, in contrast to the documentaries produced by the Proletarian Film League of Japan, and often featured proletarian protagonists set against upper-class counterparts. Daisuke Itō's jidaigeki (period drama) films had increasingly featured heroes in revolt against the social system of historical Japan, including Servant (1927) and Man-Slashing, Horse-Piercing Sword (1929). Left-wing literature was another influence on the genre, with films such as A Living Puppet and What Made Her Do It? being adaptations of realist shingeki plays. Tomu Uchida's A Living Puppet was the story of an "insincere but talented man who cannot survive within the structure of a capitalist society." Behold This Mother crossed the tendency film over with the genre of haha-mono, films which promoted the role of the mother. While Soviet films such as Battleship Potemkin and Mother had been refused entry to Japan, Mizoguchi's Metropolitan Symphony showed the influence of Soviet cinema and its montage.

Due to the pre-existing Peace Preservation Law in Japan, tendency films were censored since the first developments of the genre. Despite winning the Kinema Junpo Award for Best Film of the Year in 1929, Masahiro Makino's Street of Masterless Samurai was cut severely. Tomu Uchida's intended follow-up to A Living Puppet, The Bluebird, was halted by censors altogether. Kenji Mizoguchi's Metropolitan Symphony won accolades abroad, but a cut version was shown in Japan: a contemporary Kinema Junpo review complained that "In the uncensored version of the film, the life of the bourgeois is shown as one of deception, corruption, and idle leisure... The contrast between the bourgeois life and proletarian life has been destroyed."

The tendency film has been criticised as a "heavily commercialized... version of cinematic leftism" which "tended toward leftist sympathies but avoided overt political commitment" (Donald Richie), Already in the 1930s, critic Akira Iwasaki diminished the films as "purely... moneymaking commodities". Many of these had been produced by the liberal Nikkatsu studios, but their success resulted in other companies following the trend. Shigeyoshi Suzuki's What Made Her Do It? was produced by Teikine, a studio specialised in entertainment films, and introduced "vulgar elements" (Geoffrey Nowell-Smith) aimed at its audience. ABC Lifeline, which contained scenes of striking workers, was produced by Shochiku, a studio wary of the genre's underlying ideology, and directed by the "nominally conservative" Yasujirō Shimazu.

What Made Her Do It? was the most financially successful of all Japanese silent films, playing for five weeks in Asakusa and two months in Osaka. The Asakusa screenings drove audiences to stamp their feet and shout political slogans in appreciation. Riots were reported by the press. The success of What Made Her Do It? prompted Japan's Home Ministry to increase its scrutiny of political films: a Censorship Review from June 1930 describes the art form as having "embarked on a concerted effort to influence the thinking of society in general."

== Decline ==
In the early to mid-1930s, Japan's leftist movements declined under governmental suppression. Film historian Tadao Sato marks the end of the tendency film genre with Sotoji Kimura's 1933 film Youth Across the River. Already in 1931, Mizoguchi had distanced himself from the tendency film after the release of And Yet They Go On. Teppei Kataoka, screenwriter of A Living Puppet and Metropolitan Symphony, served a two-year prison sentence and underwent tenkō (forced ideological conversion) following his arrest in 1932. Some of the exponents of the tendency film turned to films which advocated the Japanese government's policy and military. Suzuki directed two propaganda documentaries in 1933, on which Sato comments:

If we accept [What Made Her Do It?] as a work of genuine leftism, we can only marvel at the speed of his political conversion. But, as is more likely the case, if we see it merely as a rather extreme expression of social do-goodery, the question of political conversion is reduced to virtual irrelevance.

Tomotaka Tasaka, director of Behold This Mother, later directed a series of films in favour of Japan's war efforts, including Five Scouts (1938) and Mud and Soldiers (1939). Sotoji Kimura would work under Colonel Masahiko Amakasu at the Manchukuo Film Association, which was also joined (though without directing any films) by Tomu Uchida in 1941. During World War II, Mizoguchi made a series of films whose patriotic nature seemed to support the war effort, including the historical drama The 47 Ronin (1941–42). While some historians see these as works which Mizoguchi had been pressured into, others believe him to have acted voluntarily.
