= Isamu Kosugi =

Japanese actor and director (1904–1983)

Isamu Kosugi 小杉 勇
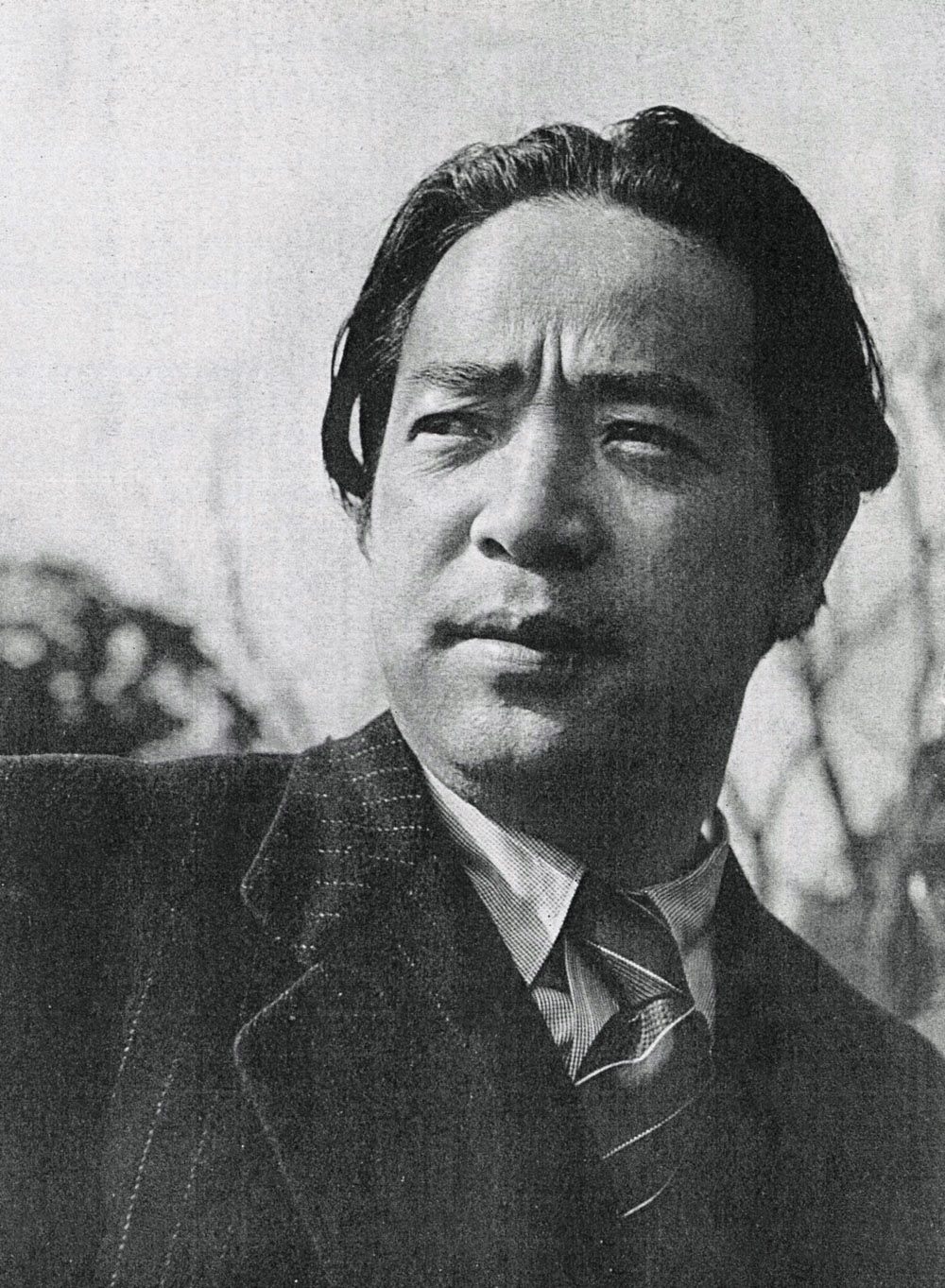
- Isamu Kosugi in 1938
- Born: Sukejirō Kosugi; 24 February 1904; Ishinomaki, Miyagi Prefecture, Japan
- Died: 8 April 1983 (aged 79)
- Occupations: Actor, film director

Isamu Kosugi (小杉 勇, Kosugi Isamu; 24 February 1904 – 8 April 1983) was a Japanese actor and film director.

== Career ==
Born in Ishinomaki in Miyagi Prefecture, Kosugi first studied at the Nihon Eiga Haiyū Gakkō before joining the Nikkatsu studio in 1925. He came to prominence in tendency films such as Ikeru ningyō (1929). He was the lead player in a series of critically acclaimed realist films made at Nikkatsu's Tamagawa studio in the 1930s, particularly Tomu Uchida's Jinsei gekijō (1936) and Tsuchi (1939) and Tomotaka Tasaka's war films, Gonin no sekkōhei (1938) and Mud and Soldiers (1939). In 1937, he starred in the German-Japanese co-production, Atarashiki tsuchi (a.k.a. Die Tochter des Samurai), directed by Arnold Fanck and Mansaku Itami. He was renowned at the time as a skilled actor with an individual style.

After World War II, he moved into directing, working primarily at Nikkatsu, where he filmed comedy series and action films starring Jō Shishido, while still appearing in films as an actor. His son was the composer Taichirō Kosugi, who did the music for Cyborg 009.

== Selected filmography ==
=== As actor ===
- Tokyo March (東京行進曲, Tōkyō kōshinkyoku) (1929)
- Ikeru ningyō (生ける人形) (1929)
- Jinsei gekijō (人生劇場) (1936)
- The Daughter of the Samurai (新しき土) (1937)
- Kagirinaki Zenshin (1937)
- Gonin no sekkōhei (五人の斥候兵) (1938)
- Robō no ishi (路傍の石) (1938)
- Tsuchi (土) (1939)
- Mud and Soldiers (土と兵隊) (1939)
- The 47 Ronin (元禄忠臣蔵, Genroku chushingura) (1941/1942)
- I Am Waiting (俺は待ってるぜ, Ore wa matteru ze) (1957)
- Jazz musume tanjō (ジャズ娘誕生, Jazu musume tanjō) (1957)
- A Slope in the Sun (陽のあたる坂道, Hi no ataru sakamichi) (1958)

=== As director ===
- Jiruba no tetsu (ジルバの鉄) (1950)—screenplay by Akira Kurosawa
- Tokyo gorin ondo (東京五輪音頭) (1964)
- Abare Kishidō (あばれ騎士道) (1965)
