= Hisako Takihana =

Japanese actress

- 瀧花久子
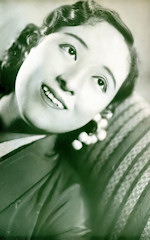
- Born: 4 March 1906; Kyoto, Japan
- Died: 12 February 1985 (aged 78)
- Other name: Fumiko Tasaka
- Occupation: Actress
- Spouse: Tomotaka Tasaka
- Relatives: Katsuhiko Tasaka (brother-in-law)

Hisako Takihana (Japanese: 瀧花久子, romanized: Takihana Hisako; 4 March 1906 – 12 February 1985), also known as Fumiko Tasaka (田坂冨美子, Tasaka Fumiko), was a Japanese actress, dubbed "the Clara Bow of Japan" in the 1920s.

== Biography ==
Takihana was born in Kyoto's Kawaramachi Sanjō district. She graduated from Kachō Girls' High School in 1924, and began acting in film soon afterward. She appeared in over a 150 films between 1926 and 1972, from acting in silent films as a young woman, with television appearances in her later years. Takihana married screenwriter and film director Tomotaka Tasaka in 1931. Her husband died in 1974, and she died in 1985, at the age of 78.

== Filmography ==
- Hito no Issho (1928)
- Tokyo koshinkayoku (1929)
- Tokai kokyogaku (1929)
- Tôjin Okichi (1930)
- Kagirinaki Zenshin (1937)
- Shinjitsu Ichiro (1937)
- Sobo (1937)
- Robo no ishi (1938)
- Hodo no Sensen (1940)
- Machi no Tamashii (1941)
- Hahakogusa (1942)
- Kaigun (1943)
- Shirayuki-sensei to kodomo-tachi (1950)
- Shukujo to fusen (1950)
- The Tale of Genji (1951)
- Meshi (1951)
- Lightning (1952)
- Oka wa hanazakari (1952)
- Husband and Wife (1953)
- Fumetsu no nekkyu (1955)
- Samurai II: Duel at Ichijoji Temple (1955)
- Suzakumon (1957)
- Jinsei Gekijo (Seishun-hen) (1958)
- Sen-hime goten (1960)
- Katsukake Tokijiro (1961)
- Gion matsuri (1968)
- Sukurappu Shudan (1968)
- The Long Darkness (1972)
