= A Hole of My Own Making =

1955 Japanese film

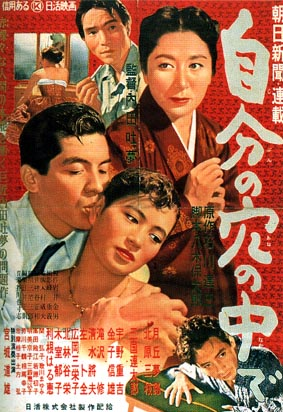
- Japanese movie poster
- Directed by: Tomu Uchida
- Written by: Yasutarō Yagi; Tatsuzō Ishikawa (novel)
- Produced by: Kaneo Iwai
- Starring: Rentarō Mikuni; Yumeji Tsukioka; Mie Kitahara; Jūkichi Uno
- Cinematography: Shigeyoshi Mine
- Music by: Yasushi Akutagawa
- Production company: Nikkatsu
- Distributed by: Nikkatsu
- Release date: 28 September 1955 (Japan)
- Running time: 125 minutes
- Country: Japan
- Language: Japanese

A Hole of My Own Making (自分の穴の中で, Jibun no ana no nakade) is a 1955 Japanese drama film directed by Tomu Uchida. It is based on a novel by Tatsuzō Ishikawa.

== Plot ==
Amidst endless construction and aircraft noise, a family whose father died slowly disintegrates. While daughter Tamiko struggles with her stepmother Nobuko's attempts to marry her off to careless physician Ihura, her bed-ridden brother Junjirō grieves for his ex-wife Keiko who left him for another man. Although Ihura is more interested in Nobuko, he has a short-lived affair with Tamiko, who herself cares only for Ihura's future social and financial status. After selling the family's last remaining properties, Tamiko and Junjirō refuse to give Nobuko her share. Nobuko moves out of the house, announcing that she will take legal steps against her stepchildren's decision. Shortly before his death, Junjirō confesses to Tamiko that he lost the family's money and the mortgaged house in ill-fated stock market investments.

== Cast ==
- Rentarō Mikuni as Shōnosuke Ihura
- Yumeji Tsukioka as Nobuko Shiga
- Mie Kitahara as Tamiko
- Jūkichi Uno as Tetsutarō Komatsu
- Nobuo Kaneko as Junjirō
- Harue Tone as Keiko
- Bokuzen Hidari as Hota
- Masao Shimizu as Fujita
- Tanie Kitabayashi as aunt
- Osamu Takizawa as uncle

== Production ==
A Hole of My Own Making was one of the first productions of the newly reopened Nikkatsu film studio.

== Legacy ==
A Hole of My Own Making was screened in the Museum of Modern Art as part of a retrospective on Tomu Uchida in 2016.
