= Takagaki =

Takagaki (written: 高垣) is a Japanese surname. Notable people with the surname include:

- Ayahi Takagaki (高垣 彩陽, born 1985), Japanese voice actress and singer
- Hitomi Takagaki (高垣 眸, 1898–1983), Japanese writer
- Reiko Takagaki (高垣 麗子, born 1979), Japanese model and actress
- Shinzo Takagaki (1893–1977), Japanese judoka
