= Tsujigiri =

Unprovoked attack by a samurai on a civilian

Tsujigiri (辻斬り or 辻斬, lit. 'crossroads killing') is a Japanese term for a practice when a samurai, after receiving a new katana or developing a new fighting style or weapon, tests its effectiveness by attacking a human opponent, usually a random defenceless passer-by, in many cases during night time. The practitioners themselves are also referred to as tsujigiri.

The act of tsujigiri against defenceless civilians was widely and socially condemned as immoral, cowardly, and associated with rogue samurais and bandits, and was not considered common or respectable samurai practice. It was made a capital offence by law in 1602 by the Edo government.

== Variations ==
Sword attacks were not the only possible application of this act. In a variation named tsuji-nage (辻投げ, "crossroads throwing"), the samurai would attack the passer-by with jujutsu in order to test his own techniques or indulge in alive practice.

== History ==
In the medieval era, the term referred to traditional duels between samurai, but in the Sengoku period (1467–1600), widespread lawlessness caused it to degrade into indiscriminate murder, permitted by the unchecked power of the samurai. Shortly after order was restored, the Edo government prohibited the practice in 1602. Offenders would receive capital punishment.

=== 1696 spree killing ===
1696 Yoshiwara spree killing
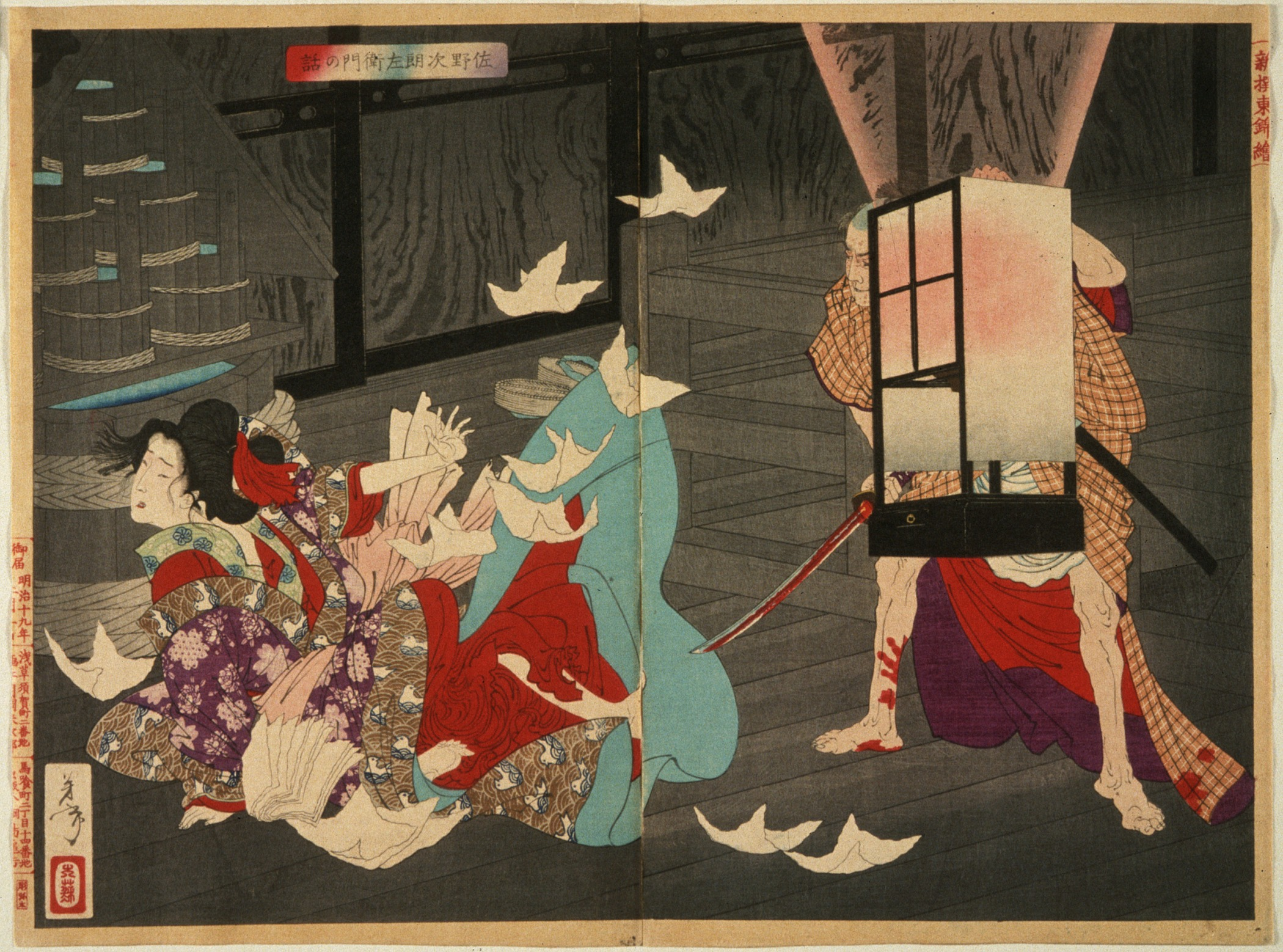
- Tsukioka Yoshitoshi's Sano Jirōzaemon Murdering a Courtesan (1886)
- Location: Yoshiwara, Edo, Tokugawa shogunate (Japan)
- Date: December 1696
- Weapon: Katana
- Perpetrator: Sano Jirōzaemon

The only known incident in which a very large number of people were indiscriminately killed in the Edo period was the 1696 Yoshiwara spree killing (吉原百人斬り, Yoshiwara hyakunin giri; lit. "Yoshiwara Hundred People Slashing"), when a wealthy lord, Sano Jirōzaemon, had a psychotic fit and murdered dozens of prostitutes with a katana in Yoshiwara, the red-light district of Edo (modern-day Tokyo). He was executed as a spree killer. Later, a kabuki play was made about the incident, which inspired the 1960 film adaptation Hero of the Red-Light District.

== Reactions against ==
Towards the end of the Edo period, martial artist Motoyoshi Kanaya, a disciple to Hikosuke Totsuka (not to be confused with his grandson, also named Motoyoshi Kanaya), heard that criminals used to practice tsujigiri in Akabanebashi Bridge, in Shiba. He took the custom to arrive earlier and hide, so when the attackers showed up, he came out and killed or forced them to flee.

== Mary Midgley's "Trying Out One's New Sword" ==
British philosopher Mary Midgley wrote an essay objecting to cultural relativism and moral relativism in 1981. In "Trying Out One's New Sword", she discusses tsujigiri as an example of an abominable practice that could be condemned. A professor of Japanese history, Jordan Sand, criticized Midgley for allegedly misrepresenting the practices of ancient Japan. He argues that tsujigiri was never condoned, and it is not even clear it happened with any frequency. Sand believes that any samurai who did so was both rare and would be considered insane by the culture of the era and that Midgley erred in presenting it as having been an accepted practice. Despite this, Sand states that he finds the essay worthwhile.

== See also ==
- Crypteia
- Kiri-sute gomen
- Tameshigiri
- The Dull Sword
