= Tsuchi (film) =

1939 Japanese film

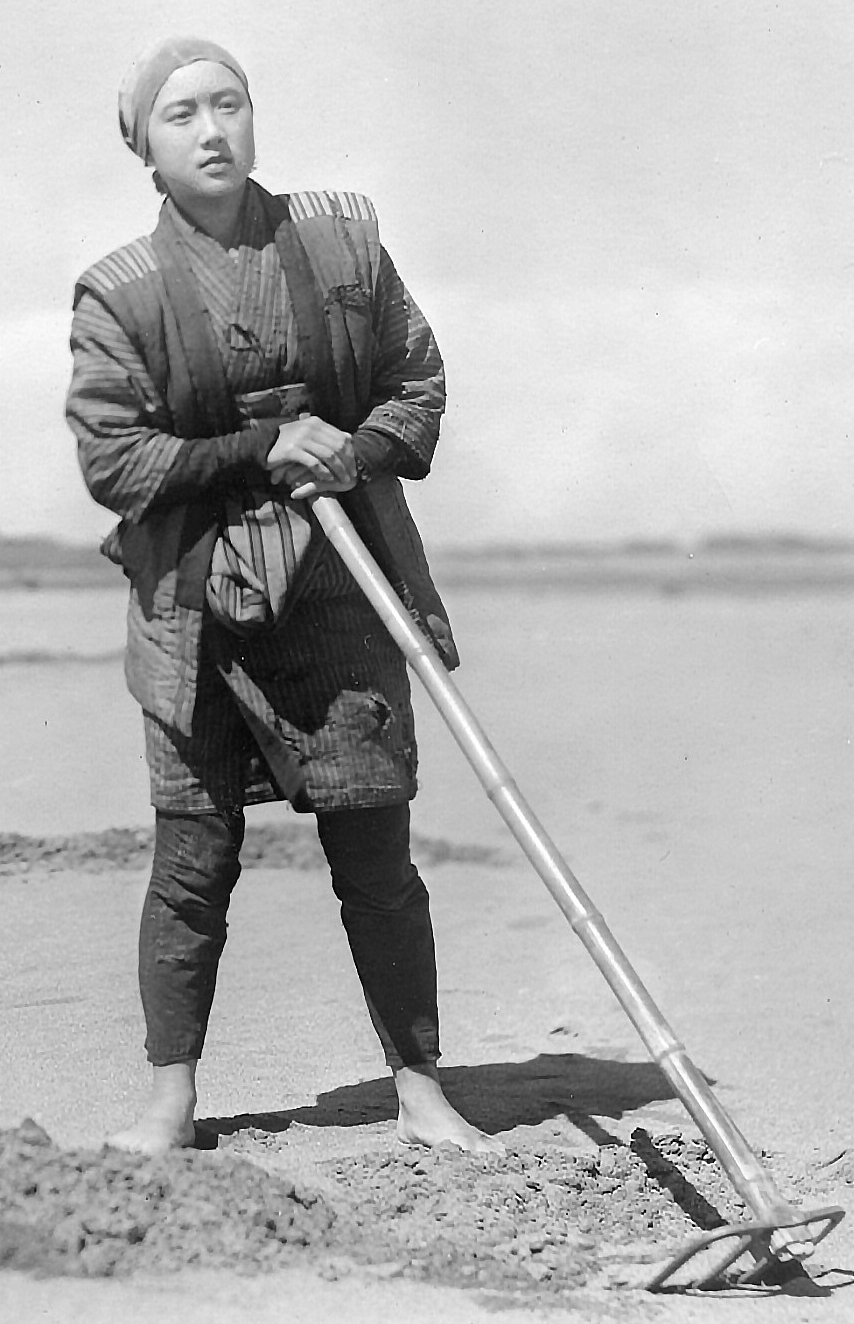
- Akiko Kazami in Tsuchi
- Directed by: Tomu Uchida
- Written by: Tsutomu Kitamura Yasutarō Yagi
- Story by: Takashi Nagatsuka
- Starring: Isamu Kosugi; Akiko Kazami; Kaichi Yamamoto
- Cinematography: Michio Midorikawa
- Music by: Akihiro Norimatsu
- Release date: 13 April 1939 (Japan)
- Running time: 142 minutes
- Country: Japan
- Language: Japanese

Earth (Japanese: 土, Hepburn: Tsuchi) is a 1939 Japanese drama film directed by Tomu Uchida. It is based on the 1912 novel Tsuchi by poet Takashi Nagatsuka.

== Plot ==
The plot of Earth focuses on a family of farmers who are down on their luck, but also extensively depicts the rural community's milieu, daily work and way of life. Kanji is embittered because he has to pay off the debts of his dead wife's father. He is also overly protective of his daughter, Otsugi, which severely restricts her interaction with the community.

== Cast ==
- Isamu Kosugi as Kanji
- Akiko Kazami as Otsugi
- Kaichi Yamamoto as Ukichi
- Chieko Murata as landlord's wife

== Production ==
Director Tomu Uchida's original plan to film Nagatsuka's famous novel was turned down by Nikkatsu, the studio to which he was under contract. While Uchida was working on other projects for the studio, he began filming Tsuchi on weekends without authorization. This secret filming included on-location shooting in Japan. Once Nikkatsu caught wind of what was happening it was too late; the production was too far along for the studio to halt it. The management feared losing face with its workers, who had already put in a lot of time making the film, so Nikkatsu decided to complete the film and released it to the public to unexpected commercial success.

== Versions ==
A seriously compromised print of Earth was discovered in Germany in 1968. It suffers from nitrate damage and includes German subtitles. It is missing its first and last reel. The original film was 142 minutes long; this version runs 93 minutes. A longer version of the film was discovered in Moscow's Gosfilmofond in 1999. It, too, is missing the last reel.

== Legacy ==
Earth was screened in a restored, though still incomplete print, incorporating the Gosfilmofond version, at the Museum of Modern Art as part of a retrospective on Tomu Uchida in 2016.

Japanese filmmaker Akira Kurosawa cited Earth as one of his 100 favorite films.

== Awards ==
Earth won the 1940 Kinema Junpo Award for Best Film.
