= A Slope in the Sun =

- Japanese movie poster
- Directed by: Tomotaka Tasaka
- Written by: Ichirō Ikeda; Tomotaka Tasaka
- Based on: Hi no ataru sakamichi by Yōjirō Ishizaka
- Cinematography: Saburo Isayama
- Music by: Masaru Sato
- Distributed by: Nikkatsu
- Release date: April 15, 1958 (Japan)
- Running time: 214 minutes
- Country: Japan
- Language: Japanese

A Slope in the Sun (Japanese: 陽のあたる坂道, Hepburn: Hi no ataru sakamichi), aka A Slope in the Sun, is a 1958 black-and-white Japanese drama film directed by Tomotaka Tasaka. The film is based on the novel by Yōjirō Ishizaka. It won the 1959 Blue Ribbon Award for best director, and also won the 1959 Mainichi Film Award for best cinematography.

== Cast ==
- Yujiro Ishihara as Shinji Tashiro
- Mie Kitahara as Takako
- Koreya Senda as Tamakichi Tashiro
- Yukiko Todoroki as Midori Tashiro
- Izumi Ashikawa as Kumiko Tashiro
- Tamio Kawachi as Tamio Takagi
- Isamu Kosugi as Shiosawa
