= Men, Animals and Sensations =

1938 film directed by Harry Piel

- Directed by: Harry Piel
- Written by: J.M. Frank; Erwin Kreker; Reinhold Meißner; Harry Piel
- Produced by: Harry Piel; Willy Reiber
- Starring: Harry Piel; Ruth Eweler; Elisabeth Wendt
- Cinematography: Karl Hasselmann; Bruno Timm; Fritz von Friedl
- Edited by: Hilde Grebner
- Music by: Fritz Wenneis
- Production company: Ariel-Film
- Release date: 23 December 1938
- Running time: 90 minutes
- Country: Germany
- Language: German

Men, Animals and Sensations (German: Menschen, Tiere, Sensationen) is a 1938 German drama film directed by and starring Harry Piel and also featuring Ruth Eweler and Elisabeth Wendt. It is a circus film. It was shot at the Terra Studios in Berlin with sets designed by the art director Max Knaake. Location filming took place at the Sarrasani circus in Dresden.

== Cast ==
- Harry Piel as Robert Hansen / Gen. Bobby / Artist
- Ruth Eweler as Fedora
- Elisabeth Wendt as Maja de Passy
- Edith Oß as Estrella - genannt Ella
- Josef Karma as Franz - Tierpfleger
- Egon Brosig as Hopkins - Assistent bei Fedora
- Willi Schur as Theateragent
- Eugen Rex as Der Zauberkünstler
- Franz Arzdorf as Gast in der Hotelbar "Astoria"
- Charly Berger as Ringmeister im Varieté
- Raffles Bill as Varietéartist
- Gerhard Dammann as Krause, Hausmeister
- Liesl Eckardt as Garderobenfrau von Fedora
- Charles Francois as Ein Ober in der Bar
- Knut Hartwig as Ober
- Alfred Karen as Portier im Hotel "Imperial"
- Philipp Manning as Arzt im Varieté
- Karl Platen as Briefträger
- S.O. Schoening as Direktor
- Michael von Newlinsky as Gast in der Hotelbar "Astoria"
- Aruth Wartan as Falk, Tierpfleger
- Eduard Wenck as Theateragent

== Bibliography ==
- Klaus, Ulrich J. Deutsche Tonfilme: Jahrgang 1938. Klaus-Archiv, 1988.
- Reimer, Robert C. & Reimer, Carol J. Historical Dictionary of German Cinema. Rowman & Littlefield, 2019.
- Rentschler, Eric. The Ministry of Illusion: Nazi Cinema and Its Afterlife. Harvard University Press, 1996.
