= Shirayuki-sensei to kodomo-tachi =

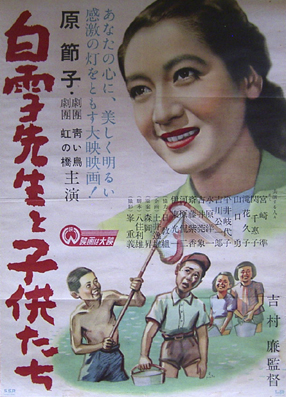
- Japanese movie poster
- Directed by: Ren Yoshimura
- Screenplay by: Toshio Yasumi
- Story by: Noboru Morioka
- Starring: Setsuko Hara; Chieko Seki; Takashi Kohama
- Cinematography: Shigeyoshi Mine
- Music by: Urato Watanabe
- Production company: Daiei Film
- Release date: January 29, 1950 (Japan)
- Running time: 89 minutes
- Country: Japan
- Language: Japanese

Shirayuki-sensei to kodomo-tachi (Japanese: 白雪先生と子供たち), also known as Children and the Snow Teacher, is a 1950 black-and-white Japanese film directed by Ren Yoshimura (吉村廉).

== Cast ==
Actor	Role
Setsuko Hara	Kayoko Amamiya
Chieko Seki	Chie
Takashi Kohama	Toshihiko Harashima
Hisako Takihana	Hama
Jun Miyazaki	
Isamu Yamaguchi	
Kōichirō Yoshikawa	
