= Robert Dorsay =

German singer, dancer and actor

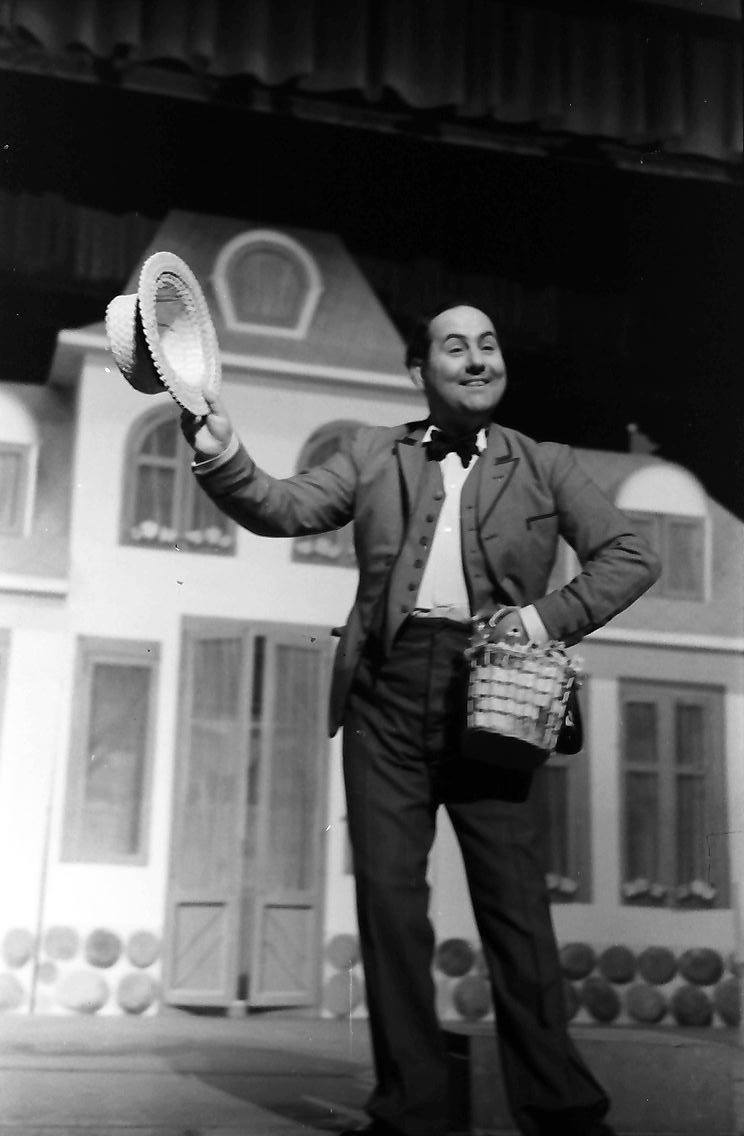
- Born: Robert Stampa; 16 August 1904; Bremen; German Empire
- Died: 29 October 1943 (aged 39); Berlin; Nazi Germany
- Occupations: Film actor; dancer; singer

Robert Dorsay (16 August 1904 – 29 October 1943) was a German actor, dancer, and singer who was executed in October 1943 for defeatism and defamation of National Socialism.

== Life ==
The only son of the opera singer Paul Stampa and the soprano Dora Stampa, née Weiss, spent his childhood and youth in Bremen, Würzburg, Kissingen and finally in Berlin. He began his stage career in Austria and moved to Munich in 1927. Dora Weiss wore the stage name Dorsay, which her son later adopted.

Robert Stampa appeared on stage for the first time in the late 1920s. At the Theater am Gärtnerplatz in Munich he appeared as a singer and ballet dancer in 1928; from 1929 to 1931 he worked there as a singer and ballet master. From 1933 he played at the Nuremberg Intimate Theater, from 1934 he belonged to the ensemble of the Berlin "Cabaret of Comedians" on Kurfürstendamm and acted in many films, e.g. with Gustaf Gründgens, Zarah Leander, Theo Lingen, Margit Symo (mother of Tatort actress Eva Mattes ) or Anny Ondra.

From 1935 he was engaged as a comedian in the cabaret at the Theater am Admiralspalast in Berlin. His love was for swing, his preference for political jokes. From 1936 to 1939 he appeared in various, mostly small, roles in film.

“Robert Dorsay", as he now called himself, tried to come to terms with the regime; so he joined the NSDAP on 1 August 1932. On the other hand, he kept a comedic distance and also used Hitler jokes and imitations in public to friends. On 1 September 1933 he was expelled from the party because of overdue payments of membership fees. Dorsay himself did not rejoin the party despite the persuasion of Reich Chamber of Culture official Hans Hinkel. Nevertheless, he was able to perform until the early 1940s and was properly registered with the Reich Chamber of Culture. Dorsay's attitude, however, was to have professional consequences, because from 1939 his film engagements were discontinued."

== Execution ==
In 1939 he married Louise Mentkes. In 1941 Dorsay was drafted into the Wehrmacht and served as a driver. In March 1943, while on leave from home, he caught the eye of a Gestapo informer while telling a political joke on stage in the restaurant of the Deutsches Theater, which went: "Hitler enters a town and a young girl approaches him offering him a handful of dust. 'What am I supposed to do with this?' asks Hitler looking puzzled. And the young girl answers. 'Everyone says, when the Führer bites the dust, everything will get better.'" Dorsay eventually received a death sentence for "undermining the war effort" due to this joke.

His correspondence was then checked. On 31 March a letter from Osterode to his friend Eddy Haase was intercepted in Berlin, in which he wrote: "When will this idiocy finally end?" He was arrested and sentenced to death on 8 October 1943 for "undermining military force" and sent to Plötzensee where he was executed. The death sentence was intended to deter other artists; his name was systematically removed from the opening credits of the films in which he had acted.

== Selected filmography ==
- Honeymoon (1936)
- A Girl from the Chorus (1937)
- The Ways of Love Are Strange (1937)
- Spiel auf der Tenne (1937)
- To New Shores (1937)
- Die Fledermaus (1937)
- Adventure in Warsaw (1937)
- Cause for Divorce (1937)
- Carousel (1937)
- Love Letters from Engadin (1938)
- The Girl with a Good Reputation (1938)
- Rubber (1938)
- Dance on the Volcano (1938)
- Robert and Bertram (1939)

== Bibliography ==
- O'Brien, Mary-Elizabeth. Nazi Cinema as Enchantment: The Politics of Entertainment in the Third Reich. Camden House, 2006.
- Schulte-Sasse, Linda. Entertaining the Third Reich: Illusions of Wholeness in Nazi Cinema. Duke University Press, 1996.
