= What Made Her Do It? =

1930 Japanese film

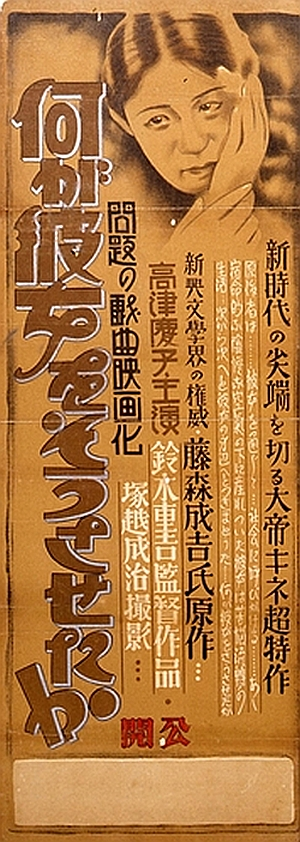
- Theatrical Poster

Japanese name
- Kanji: 何が彼女をそうさせたか
- Directed by: Shigeyoshi Suzuki
- Written by: Shigeyoshi Suzuki
- Based on: That Girl Sumiko, What Made Her Do It?; by Seikichi Fujimori
- Produced by: Teikoku Kinema Engei
- Starring: Keiko Takatsu; Rintarō Fujima; Yōyō Kojima; Hidekatsu Maki
- Cinematography: Seiji Tsukakoshi
- Production company: Teikoku Kinema Engei
- Distributed by: Kinokuniya
- Release date: 6 February 1930 (Japan)
- Running time: 3,019 meters (original version); 78 minutes (restored version)
- Country: Japan
- Languages: Silent (Japanese intertitles)

What Made Her Do It? (Japanese: 何が彼女をそうさせたか, Hepburn: Nani ga kanojo o sō saseta ka) is a 1930 Japanese silent film directed by Shigeyoshi Suzuki. It was the top-grossing Japanese film of the silent era. Notable as an example of the tendency film genre, it reportedly caused a riot upon its showing in Tokyo's Asakusa district.

== Plot ==
The plot centers on a young girl, Sumiko, who has been sent by her father to live with her uncle. As there is no school in her hometown, her uncle is supposed to send her to school. Arriving to a harried household with many children, her aunt and alcoholic uncle are annoyed by her arrival. A note, which Sumiko cannot read, announces that her father has killed himself. After being denied schooling and placed into labor for the family, Sumiko is eventually sold to a circus where she suffers at the hands of its members and ringmaster. Sumiko escapes with another circus performer, Shintaro, but Sumiko joins a team of thieves and ends up arrested. She is given work in the home of a wealthy aristocratic family, who denies even the simplest of pleasures to their staff out of cruelty. She is sent to a Christian orphanage, where she is humiliated for writing a letter to an old friend, and must make a public speech renouncing her ways and accepting Christ into her heart. Given the opportunity, Sumiko instead denounces the church, and ends up burning it down.

== Cast ==
- Keiko Takatsu as Sumiko
- Rintarō Fujima as Hiroshi Hasegawa
- Ryuujin Unno as Shintarō
- Yōyō Kojima
- Hidekatsu Maki
- Itaru Hamada
- Takashi Asano
- Saburō Ōno

== Production and reception ==
After the commercial success of other tendency films such as Tomu Uchida's A Living Puppet and Kenji Mizoguchi's Metropolitan Symphony (both 1929), produced by the Nikkatsu studio, the entertainment-oriented Teikine (Teikoku Kinema Engei) studio produced What Made Her Do It?, introducing "vulgar elements" (Geoffrey Nowell-Smith) aimed at the audience to the story, thus lightening its social criticism. The film was an enormous commercial success, with press reports of riots following its showing in Tokyo's Asakusa district.

In his 2005 book A Hundred Years of Japanese Film, film historian Donald Richie titled the film "a melodramatic potboiler", at the same time acknowledging it for being "also extraordinarily film literate". The British Film Institute listed What Made Her Do It? as the best Japanese film of 1930, considering it to be representative of the period's tendency films.

== Restoration ==
The film, thought to be lost after World War II, was restored in 1997 from an incomplete print found in the Russian Gosfilmofond archive in 1994. The restoration, under supervision of Yoneo Ōta, replaced missing scenes at start and finish of the film with title cards.
