= Cause for Divorce =

1937 film

- Directed by: Karel Lamač
- Written by: Karl Bachmann (play); Aldo von Pinelli; Václav Wasserman
- Starring: Anny Ondra; Jack Trevor; Robert Dorsay
- Cinematography: Štěpán Kopecký; Ferdinand Pečenka
- Music by: Jára Benes
- Production companies: Ondra-Lamac-Film; Moldavia Film
- Distributed by: Moldavia Film
- Release date: 17 August 1937
- Countries: Czechoslovakia; Germany
- Language: German

Cause for Divorce (German: Der Scheidungsgrund) is a 1937 Czech-German comedy drama film directed by Karel Lamač and starring Anny Ondra, Jack Trevor and Robert Dorsay. It was Ondra's last film to be directed by Lamač.

== Cast ==
- Anny Ondra as Anny, a young girl
- Jack Trevor as Fenton
- Robert Dorsay as Spargel
- Paul Hörbiger as Toni Bernhof
- Ruth Eweler as Seine Frau
- Willi Volker as Dr. Werkmann, Lawyer
- Theodor Pištek
- Raoul Schránil
- Hans Volker as Lawyer Dr. Werkmann

== Bibliography ==
- Bock, Hans-Michael; Bergfelder, Tim, eds. (2009). The Concise Cinegraph: Encyclopaedia of German Cinema. New York: Berghahn Books. ISBN 978-1-57181-655-9.
