= The Daughter of the Samurai =

1937 German-Japanese film

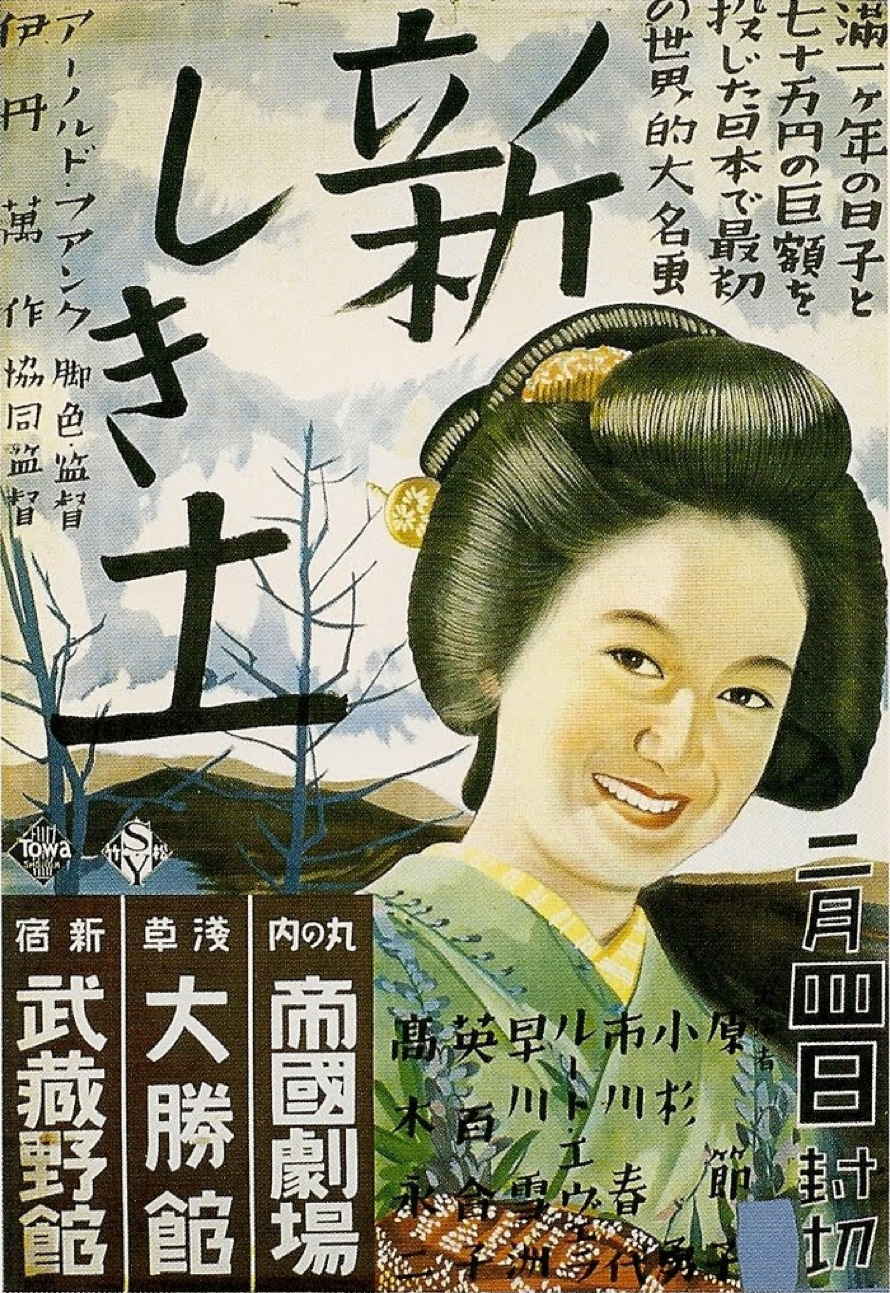
- Japanese theatrical release poster
- Directed by: Arnold Fanck; Mansaku Itami
- Special effects by: Eiji Tsuburaya
- Written by: Arnold Fanck
- Produced by: Arnold Fanck; Nagamasa Kawakita; Yoshio Osawa
- Starring: Setsuko Hara; Ruth Eweler; Sessue Hayakawa
- Cinematography: Richard Angst; Walter Riml
- Edited by: Arnold Fanck
- Music by: Kosaku Yamada
- Production companies: JO Studios; Nikkatsu; Dr. Arnold Fanck-Film
- Distributed by: T&K Telefilm
- Release dates: 4 February 1937 (Japan); 23 March 1937 (Germany)
- Running time: 127 minutes (Fanck version); 115 minutes (Itami version)
- Countries: Japan; Germany
- Languages: Japanese; German

The Daughter of the Samurai (German: Die Tochter des Samurai, Japanese: Atarashiki Tsuchi (新しき土, The New Earth)) (Note: Also known as The New Land.) is a 1937 German-Japanese drama film directed by Arnold Fanck and Mansaku Itami, with special effects by Eiji Tsuburaya. Starring Setsuko Hara, Ruth Eweler and Sessue Hayakawa, it was the first of two co-productions between Imperial Japan and Nazi Germany. Fanck, who was famous for making mountaineering films, was possibly chosen as director because of his connections to the Nazi Party. Fanck and Itami clashed a great deal during the film's production, and in effect created two separate versions for release in their respective countries.

== Plot ==
Yamato Teruo (Isamu Kosugi) returns to Japan after spending six years at an agricultural college in Germany. Teruo is the adopted son of an old samurai family, and is expected to marry the eldest daughter, Mitsuko (Setsuko Hara). However, Teruo has become infected with the idea of Western individualism during his stay in Western Europe, and refuses to bow to the demands of society. Instead, he confounds his future father-in-law Yamato Iwao (Sessue Hayakawa) by announcing that he intends to marry a German journalist, Gerda Storm (Ruth Eweler), whom he met on the ship back to Japan. Gerda, however, is a blonde, chaste, Aryan woman, and will not agree to a mixed-race relationship. She attempts to convince him of his duty to the Japanese race and traditions and to reconcile him with his family.

Meanwhile, Mitsuko, feeling dishonored by Teruo's rejection, attempts to commit suicide by throwing herself into a volcano. She is rescued at the last second by Teruo, and the couple is romantically reunited. Sometime later, the young couple and their baby are now living in Manchukuo, the "New Earth", working on a farm under the benevolent gaze of a vigilant soldier guarding against the ever-present threat of Bolshevism.

== Cast ==
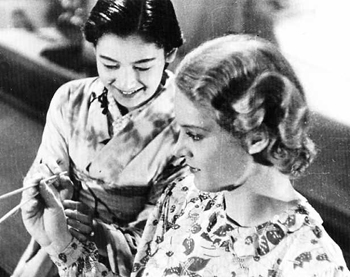
Setsuko Hara and Ruth Eweler in Atarashiki Tsuchi

Actor	Role
Setsuko Hara	Mitsuko Yamato
Ruth Eweler	Gerda Storm
Sessue Hayakawa	Iwao Yamato
Isamu Kosugi	Teruo Yamato
Eiji Takagi	Kosaku Kanda
Haruyo Ichikawa	Hideko Kanda
Yuriko Hanabusa	Oiku, the maid
Kichiji Nakamura	Ikkan, the priest
Max Hinder	German teacher
Misako Tokiwa	Teruo's mother
Kanae Murata	Child

== Reception ==
The film was poorly received in Japan. It was viewed as a condescending treatment of Japan as an exotic Oriental nation that needed German political ideas as if it had none of its own, and the racist ideology of blood and soil was considered disturbing. One reviewer wrote:

Holding up a Buddhist manji to resemble a Nazi swastika, he portrayed temples as if they were the sole repository of the Japanese spirit. Great Buddhist statues were treated as if they wielded an absolute power. He applied the Nazi spirit of self-sacrifice indiscriminately to the Yamato spirit ... it is Germany that is requiring this New Order.
