= Ruth Eweler =

German actress

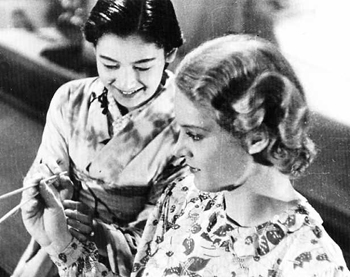
- Ruth Eweler and Setsuko Hara in The Daughter of the Samurai, 1937
- Occupation: Actor

Ruth Eweler (March 19, 1913 – October 1, 1947) was a German actress born in Plettenberg. She appeared in a number of films during the 1930s and 1940s, notably as a female lead in the 1937 film The Daughter of the Samurai, which was a German-Japanese co-production.

== Selected filmography ==
- I for You, You for Me (1934)
- The Old and the Young King (1935)
- Cause for Divorce (1937)
- The Daughter of the Samurai (1937)
- Der Scheidungsgrund (1937)
- Men, Animals and Sensations (1938)
- We Danced Around the World (1939)
- Between Hamburg and Haiti (1940)
- To Be God One Time (1942)
- Elephant Fury (1953)

== Bibliography ==
- High, Peter B. The Imperial screen: Japanese film culture in the Fifteen years' war, 1931-1945. University of Wisconsin Press, 2003.
- Hull, David Stewart. Film in the Third Reich: a study of the German cinema, 1933-1945. University of California Press, 1969.
