= Seiryū no dōkutsu =

Seiryū no dōkutsu 青竜の洞窟
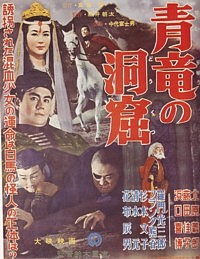
- Japanese movie poster
- Directed by: Shigeyoshi Suzuki
- Written by: Hitomi Takagaki (novel)
- Produced by: Daiei
- Production company: Daiei Film
- Release date: February 5, 1956 (Japan)
- Running time: 42 minutes
- Country: Japan
- Language: Japanese

Seiryū no dōkutsu (Japanese: 青竜の洞窟, Hepburn: Seiryū no dōkutsu; lit. "Cave of the Blue Dragon"), is a 1956 Japanese black and white film directed by Shigeyoshi Suzuki. The film is based on the novel by Hitomi Takagaki.

== Cast ==
- Yoshirō Kitahara (北原義郎)
- Yoshiko Fujita
- Yoshihiro Hamaguchi

== See also ==
- Eye of the Jaguar (豹の眼), 1956 film
