= 6th Venice International Film Festival =

Italian film festival in 1938

- Location: Venice, Italy
- Founded: 1932
- Festival date: 8 – 31 August 1938
- Website: Website

Venice Film Festival chronology
- 7th 5th

The 6th annual Venice International Film Festival was held between 8 and 31 August 1938. The festival screened a French cinema retrospective, spanning works from 1891 to 1933.

== Jury ==
- Giuseppe Volpi di Misurata, Italian businessman and politician - Jury President
- Olaf Andersson, Swedish
- Alfonso Rivas Bustamante, Mexican
- Giacomo Paolucci de'Calboli, Italian
- Luigi Freddi, Italian journalist and politician
- Miloš Havel, Czechoslovak producer and studio executive
- Neville Kearney, British
- René Jeanne, French actor, writer and historian
- Oswald Lehnich, German
- Antonio Maraini, Italian
- Humberto Mauro, Brazilian filmmaker
- Eitel Monaco, Italian
- Edmond Moreau, Swiss
- Ryszard Ordynski, Polish
- Harold Smith, American cinematographer
- Junzo Sato, Japanese
- F.L. Theron, South African
- Louis Villani, Hungarian
- Carl Vincent, Belgian

== In-Competition films ==
- The Adventures of Tom Sawyer by Norman Taurog
- The Drum by Zoltán Korda
- Come on Ponciano by Gabriel Soria
- Gonin no Sekkohei by Tomotaka Tasaka
- Heimat by Carl Froelich
- Jezebel by William Wyler
- Luciano Serra pilota by Goffredo Alessandrini
- Marie Antoinette by W. S. Van Dyke
- Olympia 1. Teil - Fest der Völker and Olympia 2. Teil - Fest der Schönheit by Leni Riefenstahl
- Prison sans barreaux by Léonide Moguy
- Pygmalion by Anthony Asquith, Leslie Howard
- Snow White and the Seven Dwarfs by Walt Disney, Wilfred Jackson, Ben Sharpsteen, David Hand
- Young Noszty and Mary Toth by Steve Sekely

== Awards ==
- Best Film:
  - Luciano Serra pilota by Goffredo Alessandrini
  - Olympia 1. Teil - Fest der Völker and Olympia 2. Teil - Fest der Schönheit by Leni Riefenstahl
- Volpi Cup:
  - Best Actor: Leslie Howard for Pygmalion
  - Best Actress: Norma Shearer for Marie Antoinette
- Special Recommendation:
  - Allá en el Rancho Grande by Fernando de Fuentes
  - Break the News by René Clair
  - Der Mustergatte with Heinz Rühmann
  - En kvinnas ansikte by Gustaf Molander
  - Fahrendes Volk by Jacques Feyder
  - Geniusz sceny by Ludwik Solski
  - Hanno rapito un uomo by Gennaro Righelli
  - Jezebel by William Wyler
  - Le quai des brumes by Marcel Carné
  - Michelangelo by Curt Oertel
  - Sotto la croce del sud by Guido Brignone
  - The Rage of Paris by Henry Koster
  - Thema's van de inspiratie by Charles Dekeukeleire
  - Urlaub auf Ehrenwort by Karl Ritter
  - Vivacious Lady by George Stevens
- Best Director: Heimat by Carl Froelich
- Medal: Natur und Technik by Ulrich K. T. Schultz
- Best Short - Fiction:
  - Armonie pucciniane by Giorgio Ferroni
  - Karakoram by Henri de Ségogne
  - Sv. Istvan (Magyar Film Iroda)
- Best Documentary:
  - Nella luce di Roma (Istituto Nazionale Luce)
  - The River by Pare Lorentz
- Best Educative or Scientific Film: Der Bienenstaat by Ulrich K. T. Schultz
- Special Award (The Grand Art Trophy): Snow White and the Seven Dwarfs by Walt Disney, Wilfred Jackson, Ben Sharpsteen and David Hand

== See also ==
- 21st Venice Biennale
