= Hero of the Red-Light District =

1960 Japanese film

- Film poster
- Directed by: Tomu Uchida
- Written by: Yoshikata Yoda
- Produced by: Jun'ichirō Tamaki
- Starring: Chiezō Kataoka; Yaeko Mizutani; Isao Kimura; Minoru Chiaki; Shinobu Chihara
- Cinematography: Sadaji Yoshida
- Edited by: Shintarō Miyamoto
- Music by: Toshio Nakamura
- Production company: Toei Company
- Distributed by: Toei Company
- Release date: 4 September 1960 (Japan)
- Running time: 109 minutes
- Country: Japan
- Language: Japanese

Hero of the Red-Light District (Japanese: 妖刀物語 花の吉原百人斬り, Hepburn: Yoto monogatari: Hana no Yoshiwara hyakunin giri), also titled Yoshiwara: The Pleasure Quarter or Killing in Yoshiwara, is a 1960 Japanese jidaigeki and drama film by Tomu Uchida.

== Plot ==
Jirozaemon, a successful textile merchant from the provinces, cannot find a wife because of his disfiguring birthmark. Even the courtesans in Yoshiwara refuse to entertain him. When he meets enslaved street prostitute Tamatsuru, who treats him with kindness, he falls in love with her, intent to free and marry her, which leads to his downfall.

== Cast ==
- Chiezō Kataoka as Jirozaemon
- Yaeko Mizutani as Tamatsuru (credited as Yoshie Mizutani)
- Isao Kimura as Einojo
- Minoru Chiaki as Josuke
- Shinobu Chihara as Yaegaki

== Legacy ==
In his Story of Cinema, David Shipman declared Uchida "the equal of Mizoguchi and Kinugasa" for this film, while film historian Alexander Jacoby rated it as "ultimately one of his [Uchida's] most conventional" works and "academic".

Hero of the Red-Light District was screened in the Museum of Modern Art as part of a retrospective on Tomu Uchida in 2016.
