= Mud and Soldiers =

- DVD cover
- Directed by: Tomotaka Tasaka
- Starring: Isamu Kosugi
- Production company: Nikkatsu
- Release date: October 15, 1939 (Japan)
- Running time: 120 minutes
- Country: Japan
- Language: Japanese

Mud and Soldiers (Japanese: 土と兵隊, Hepburn: Tsuchi to heitai) is a 1939 Japanese war film directed by Tomotaka Tasaka. It is based on the novel of the same name by Ashihei Hino.

== Cast ==
- Isamu Kosugi
