= Hitomi Takagaki =

Japanese writer

Hitomi Takagaki (高垣 眸, Takagaki Hitomi; January 20, 1898 – April 2, 1983) was a Japanese writer. Several of her stories have been adapted for film and television.

== Film and television adaptations ==
- Kaiketsu kurozukin zenpen (1936)
- (豹の眼) lit. Eye of the Jaguar (1956)
- (青竜の洞窟 Seiryū no dōkutsu) lit. Cave of the Blue Dragon (1956)
- Black Hood: The Master Thief (快傑黒頭巾, Kaiketsu kurozukin), NHK, 1976
- An Adult's Choice (大人の選択, Otona no sentaku), TBS, 1992
