= Kagirinaki Zenshin =

1937 Japanese film

- Film poster
- Directed by: Tomu Uchida
- Written by: Yasutarō Yagi (screenplay); Yasujirō Ozu (story idea)
- Starring: Isamu Kosugi; Hisako Takihana; Yukiko Todoroki; Ureo Egawa
- Cinematography: Michio Hekikawa
- Music by: Eiichi Yamada
- Production company: Nikkatsu
- Release date: 3 November 1937 (Japan)
- Running time: 99 minutes
- Country: Japan
- Language: Japanese

Kagirinaki Zenshin (Japanese: 限りなき前進; lit. "Limitless Advance") is a 1937 Japanese drama film by Tomu Uchida based on an original idea by Yasujirō Ozu.

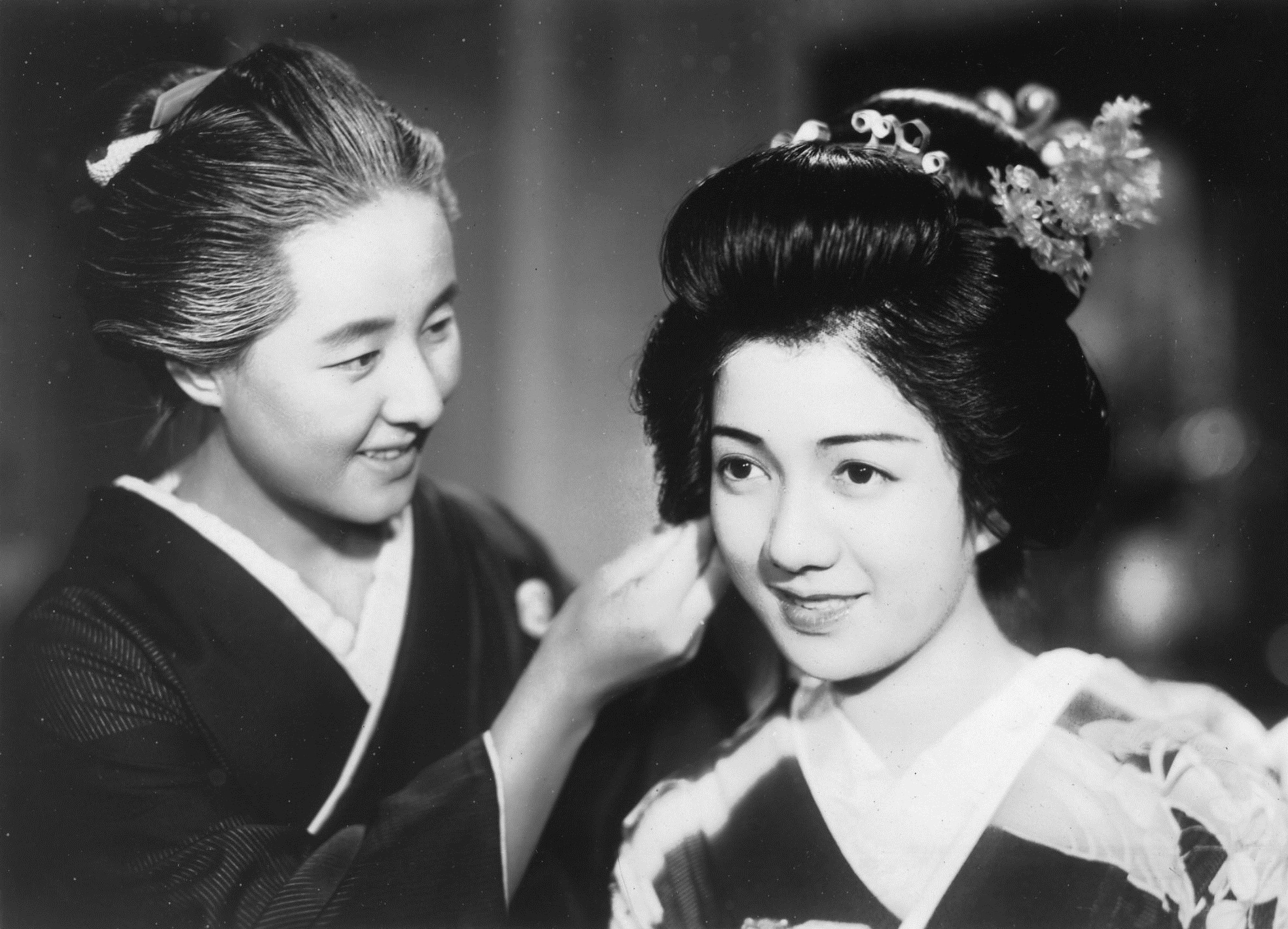

== Plot ==
The protagonist, Tokumaru, is laid off from his corporate job. Unable to accept this, he convinces himself that he has actually been promoted instead. He begins to show up at work, acting like an important man and embarrassing his family and former co-workers.

== Cast ==
- Isamu Kosugi
- Hisako Takihana
- Yukiko Todoroki
- Ureo Egawa

== Legacy ==
Dai-bosatsu tōge was screened in a surviving incomplete print of 74 minutes length in the Museum of Modern Art as part of a retrospective on Tomu Uchida in 2016.

== Awards ==
Kagirinaki Zenshin received the 1938 Kinema Junpo Award for Best Film.
