= Shigeyoshi Suzuki (film director) =

Japanese film director and screenwriter

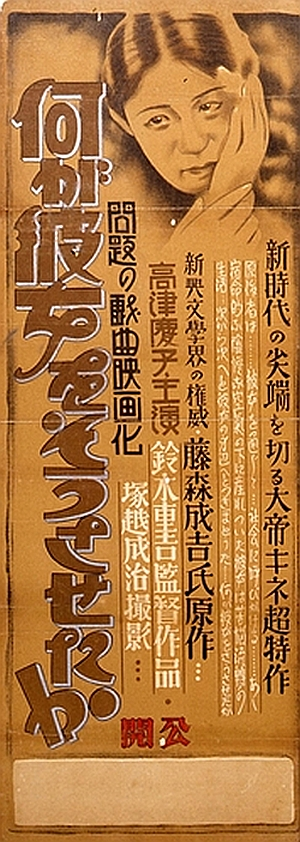
Poster for What Made Her Do It?

Shigeyoshi Suzuki (鈴木重吉, Suzuki Shigeyoshi; 25 June 1900 – 8 October 1976) was a Japanese film director and screenwriter.

Born in Tokyo, Suzuki graduated from Meiji University and entered the Shōchiku studio in 1925. He debuted as a director the next year with Tsuchi ni kagayaku, a film starring Denmei Suzuki. He later moved to Teikoku Kinema and scored a major hit with What Made Her Do It? (1930), a leftist tendency film about the social causes of a single woman's sufferings. He later worked at many studios, including Fuji Eiga and the Manchuria Film Association, and in many genres, including documentary. A largely complete print of What Made Her Do It? was discovered in a Russian archive in the 1990s and restored. It was released on DVD in Japan with English subtitles in 2008.

== Selected filmography ==
- What Made Her Do It? (Nani ga kanojo o sōsaseta ka 何が彼女をそうさせたか) (1930)
- Seiryū no dōkutsu (青竜の洞窟) (1956)
