= Yasutarō Yagi =

Japanese screenwriter

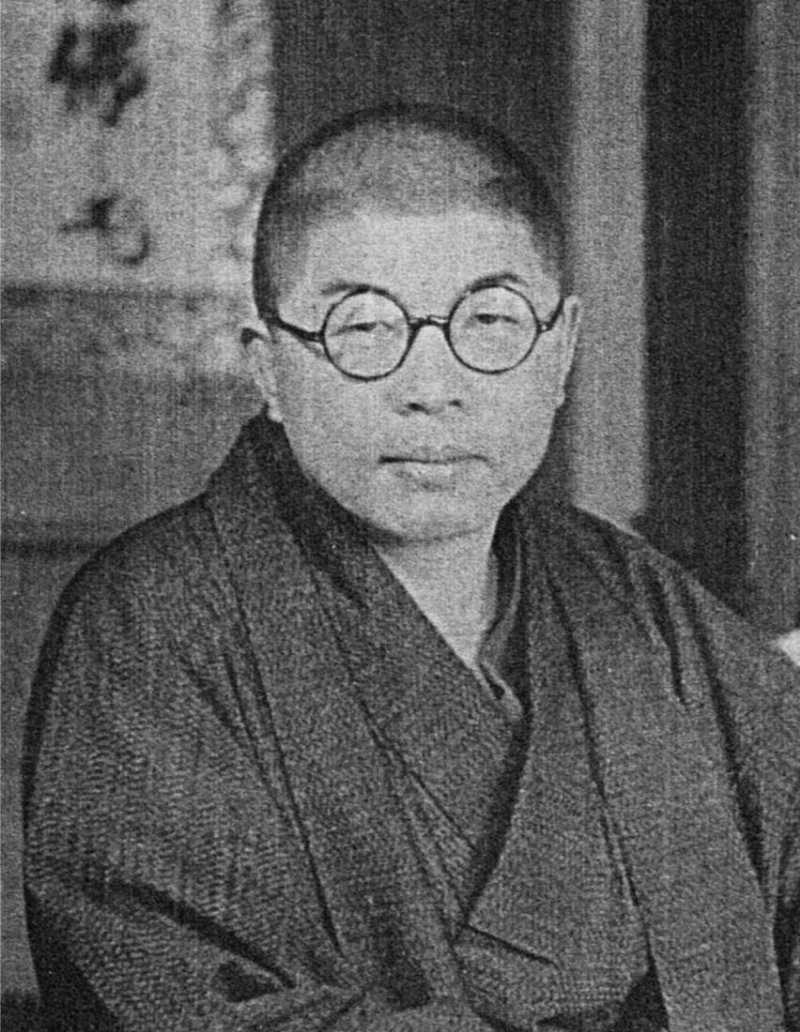
- Yasutarō Yagi in 1941
- Born: February 3, 1903; Kyogashima, Gunma, Japan
- Died: September 8, 1987 (aged 84); The Institute of Medical Science
- Other names: Sanshirō Mōri (毛利三四郎); Saburō Mōri (毛利三郎)
- Occupation: Screenwriter

Yasutarō Yagi (八木保太郎, Yagi Yasutarō) (3 February 1903 – 8 September 1987) was a Japanese screenwriter, mostly famous for his adaptations of literary works for the director Tomu Uchida in the 1930s, such as Jinsei gekijō and Kagirinaki zenshin, and for his collaborations with leftist filmmakers such as Kaneto Shindo and Tadashi Imai in the postwar period. He served as president of the Japan Screenwriters Guild.

== Filmography ==
- Screenplay: Makiba monogatari (牧場物語), “Tale of a Pasture”
- Moyuru ōzora (1940)
- Lucky Dragon No. 5 (1959)
- The River with No Bridge (1969)
