= Tomotaka Tasaka =

Japanese screenwriter and film director (1902–1974)

Tasaka Tomotaka
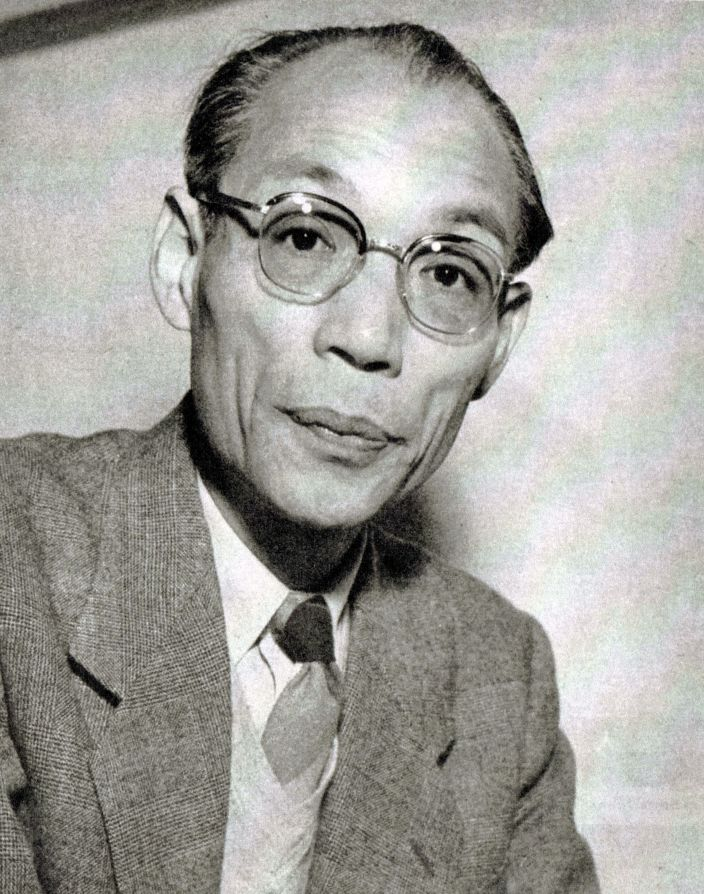
- Born: 14 April 1902; Hiroshima Prefecture
- Died: 17 October 1974 (aged 72)
- Occupation: Film director

Tomotaka Tasaka (田坂 具隆, Tasaka Tomotaka; 14 April 1902 – 17 October 1974) was a Japanese film director.

== Career ==
Born in Hiroshima Prefecture, he began working at Nikkatsu's Kyoto studio in 1924 and eventually came to prominence for a series of realist, humanist films made at Nikkatsu's Tamagawa studio in the late 1930s such as Robō no ishi and Mud and Soldiers, both of which starred Isamu Kosugi. His war film, Five Scouts, was screened in the competition at the 6th Venice International Film Festival.

Tasaka was a victim of the atomic bombing of Hiroshima and spent many years recovering. He eventually resumed directing and won the best director prize at the 1958 Blue Ribbon Awards for A Slope in the Sun, which starred Yūjirō Ishihara.

His brother, Katsuhiko Tasaka, was also a film director, and his wife, Hisako Takihana, was an actress.

== Selected filmography ==
- Five Scouts (五人の斥候兵, Gonin no sekkōhei) (1938)
- A Pebble by the Wayside (路傍の石, Robō no ishi) (1938)
- Mud and Soldiers (土と兵隊, Tsuchi to heitai) (1939)
- The Maid's Kid (女中ッ子, Jochūkko) (1955)
- The Baby Carriage (乳母車, Ubaguruma) (1956)
- This Day's Life (今日のいのち, Kyō no inochi) (1957)
- A Slope in the Sun (陽のあたる坂道, Hi no ataru sakamichi) (1958)
- Lake of Tears (湖の琴, Mizuumi no Kin) (1966)
