= Five Scouts =

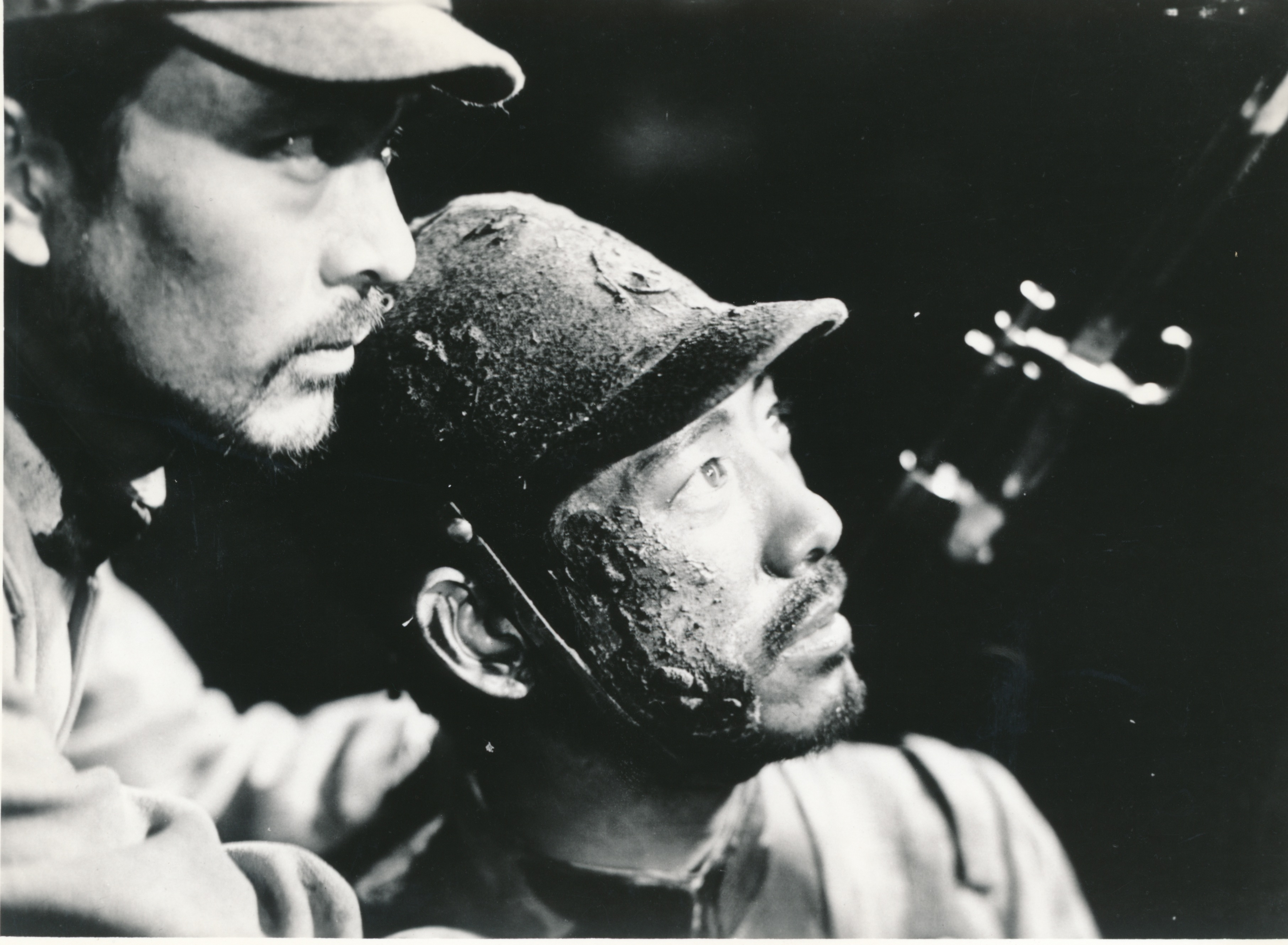
- Directed by: Tomotaka Tasaka
- Written by: Yoshio Aramaki
- Starring: Hikaru Hoshi; Ichirō Izawa
- Cinematography: Saburo Isayama
- Distributed by: Nikkatsu
- Release date: 7 January 1938 (Japan)
- Running time: 73 minutes
- Country: Japan
- Language: Japanese

Five Scouts (Japanese: 五人の斥候兵, Hepburn: Gonin no sekkōhei) is a 1938 Japanese war film directed by Tomotaka Tasaka. It won best film at the 1939 Kinema Junpo Awards and was nominated best film at the 1938 Venice International Film Festival.

== Plot ==
During the early years of the Sino-Japanese War, on the front lines in Northern China, a company commander sends five soldiers on a reconnaissance patrol, a mission that is nearly suicidal. The soldiers successfully scout the enemy's position but on their way back to base, they are ambushed, resulting in the loss of one man. The four surviving soldiers return to camp and mourn their fallen comrade, only for him to unexpectedly straggle back to camp later. He had become separated from the group in the darkness and chaos of battle.

With their mission complete, the soldiers are ordered to move out for another battle, fully aware that the likelihood of losing comrades this time is very high.

== Cast ==
- Isamu Kosuji as Unit Commander Okada
- Bontaro Miaki as Sergeant Fujimoto
- Ichiro Izawa as Private First Class Kiguchi
- Shiro Isome as Private First Class Nakamura
- Toshinosuke Nagao as Private First Class Endo
- Hikaru Hoshi as Private First Class Nagano
- Toshimasa Inoue as Private First Class Masaki
- Kiyoshi Watanabe as Private First Class Inoue
- Mantaro Ushio as Private First Class Tanaka
- Haruhiko Nishi as Corporal Yasuda
- Enji Sato as Military doctor
- Ryoichi Kikuchi as Messenger
- Ryuji Kita as Captain

== Production ==
Five Scouts was the first significant Japanese feature film to depict the undeclared war in China. The government of Japan, eager to have films made which exalted the war effort, turned to Nikkatsu Studios because of their experience and expertise in making action films - even though they were usually in historic settings. Neither director Tomotaka Tasaka nor screenwriter Ryozo Kazahara had served in the Japanese Army.

Five Scouts was inspired by Japanese newspaper coverage released in the first month of the China Incident. The characters' names were taken from real-life Japanese soldiers named in the text.

== Style ==
According to Peter B. High, Five Scouts established the predominant style of Japanese national policy films until the release of The War at Sea from Hawaii to Malaya in December 1942. Five Scouts was filmed in the style of documentary realism, made popular by propaganda newsreels celebrating Japan's invasion of China.

It is a slice of life film. Sympathy for the characters is primarily driven by each of their simple personality traits, inner lives, and sense of shared comradeship. The film emphasises the soldiers' moral virtues: they are seen laughing, sharing, reading imperial rescripts together, and discussing the afterlife. It takes what Donald Richie considers an ensemble cast approach to character development and performance style.

The film is notable for leaving the wider circumstances of the war, and the enemies encountered by the main characters, off-screen.

== Release ==
Five Scouts premiered at the Fujikan cinema in Asakusa, Tokyo on the 7th of January 1938, in the aftermath of battles in Shanghai, Taiyuan, and Nanjing.

As the film gained attention in foreign countries such as Italy and Nazi Germany, Foreign Ministry officials advised Japanese embassies in foreign countries that the film's "overall effect is depressing"; they claimed the film portrays Japan losing the Second Sino-Japanese War against their British and French-funded enemies.

In the months following the end of the Pacific War, an official film industry review by the Supreme Commander for the Allied Powers classified Five Scouts as a prohibited anti-democratic film. SCAP's censors sought all existing prints of such films.

== Reception ==
Five Scouts was highly regarded by Japanese film critics. The critic and filmmaker Tsutomu Sawamura and the ultranationalist film critic Hideo Tsumura both praised the film's humanistic theme. The editor of Kinema Junpo described it as “a film of substance, not to be dismissed as a mere military film" on its release. The magazine later awarded Five Scouts its 1938 Award for Best Film of the Year.

Five Scouts was submitted to compete in the 6th Venice International Film Festival in August 1938. It was nominated for the award of Best Foreign Film and won a Popular Culture Ministry Cup award, making it the first Japanese film to win a foreign award.

Joseph Anderson and Donald Richie compare the "humanist" politics of Five Scouts favourably against contemporary Japanese and European war films, likening it to the earlier All Quiet on the Western Front.

However, Peter B. High describes the humanist style of Five Scouts as a "rejection of the need to probe the causes of war". Historian John Dower expressed concern over foreign critical interest in the humanistic Japanese wartime films, writing that "to the viewer of such "humanistic" films as Five Scouts... Nanking would simply be a place where Japanese soldiers met hardship."

Beverley Bare Buehrer included Five Scouts in her book Japanese films: A Filmography and Commentary, writing "Tasaka, the director chosen to direct this pioneering film, was more well known for his character dramas. But it was just this bias towards creating convincing and compelling characters which made Five Scouts the success it was."
