= Tomu Uchida =

Japanese film director (1898–1970)

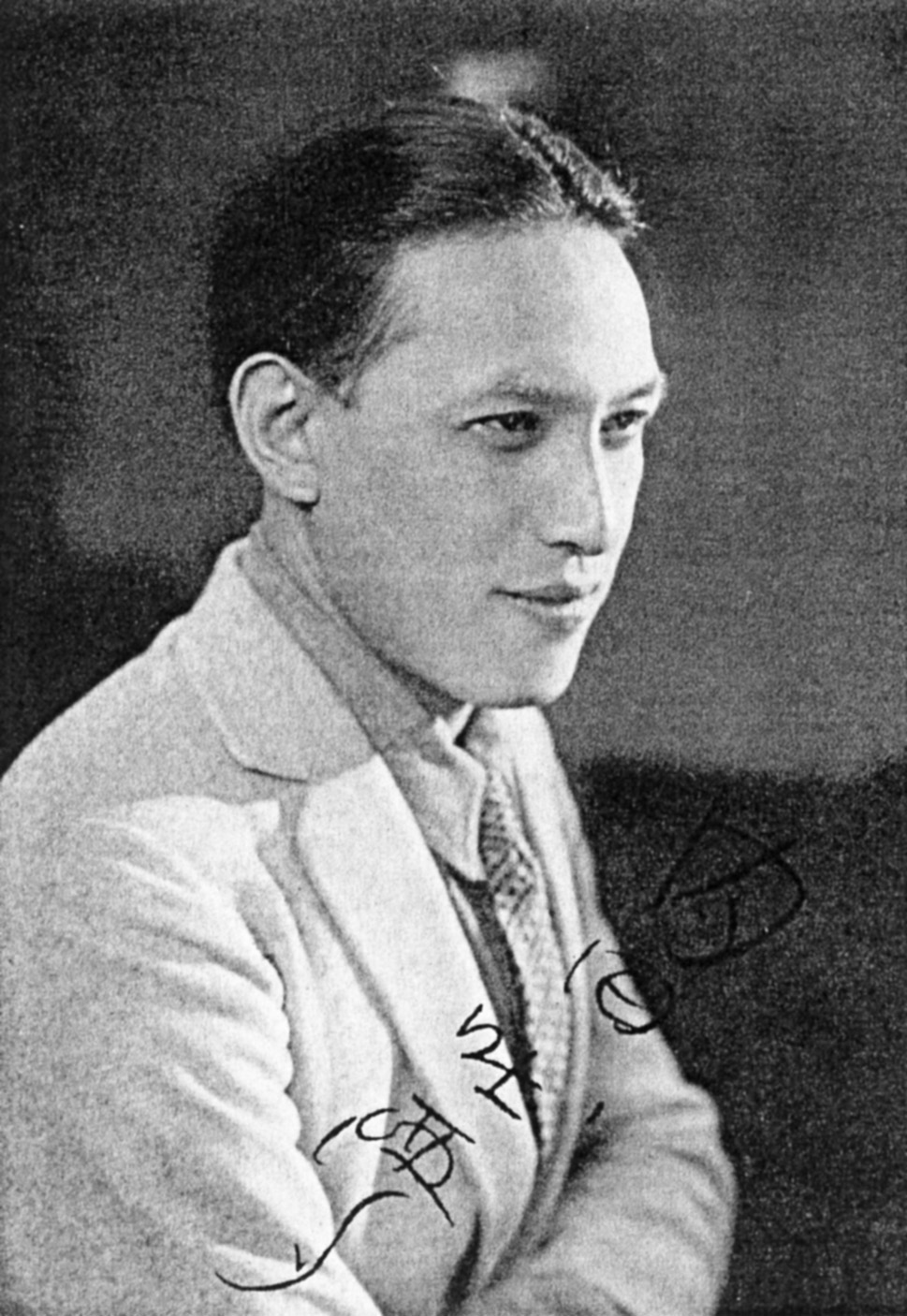
- Uchida in 1929
- Born: Tsunejirō Uchida; 26 April 1898; Okayama
- Died: 7 July 1970 (aged 72); Tokyo
- Occupations: Film director, screenwriter

Tomu Uchida (Japanese: 内田吐夢, Hepburn: Uchida Tomu; 26 April 1898 – 7 August 1970), born Tsunejirō Uchida (内田常次郎), was a Japanese film director and screenwriter. Uchida chose the stage name Tomu, a transliteration of the English Tom, written in Kanji characters meaning "to spit out dreams".

== Biography ==
=== Early career ===
After leaving junior high school in Okayama prematurely, Uchida started acting in films of the short-lived Taishō Katsuei studio in 1920, later moving to Nikkatsu in 1926. In 1927, he gave his directorial debut with Kyōsō Mikkakan (lit. "Three Days of Competition"). In the following years, Uchida worked in a variety of genres: the tendency film Ikeru Ningyo (lit. "Living Dolls"), which is regarded as one of the first of its kind, the satirical comedy and period film Adauchi Senshu (lit. "Vengeful Player", 1931) and the gangster film Policeman (Keisatsukan, 1933), Uchida's only surviving complete silent film, which film historians described as "a perfect pastiche, well ahead of its time" (Noël Burch) and "incredibly stylish" (Alexander Jacoby). His political stance has been described by critics as moving back and forth between the left and the right: while Ikeru Ningyo and Adauchi Senshu were considered "progressive", his 1933 propaganda film on Manchuria, Sakebu Ajia (lit. "Asia Cries Out"), was supported by the Japanese military, and Policeman depicted Japanese Communist Party members as gangsters.

Uchida's films met with growing critical acclaim: Kagirinaki Zenshin (1937), based on an idea by Yasujirō Ozu, and Earth (1939) were elected by Kinema Junpo magazine as the best films of the respective year. The latter was praised for its realistic depiction of the lives of poor Meiji-period tenant farmers. At the same time, it served official propaganda causes as part of the government's policy to focus on domestic agriculture after the beginning of the Second Sino-Japanese War. Regarded as Uchida's most famous pre-war film, it is extant only in incomplete prints.

In 1941, Uchida quit the Nikkatsu studio and travelled to China for 80 days, stating that he "wanted to go and just went there". He later joined Masahiko Amakasu's Manchukuo Film Association and visited Manchuria in 1943, planning a propaganda film to glorify Manchuria's invasion by the Japanese Kantōgun Tank Division, which was never realised. Uchida travelled to Manchuria again in May 1945, the official reason being that he wanted to apologise to Amakasu that the planned film had not been produced. Japan surrendered in August 1945, and Uchida, after a temporary internment, became active in lecturing young Chinese filmmakers, sometimes hindered by fights between nationalist and communist forces, but also forced to physical labour and Maoist indoctrination. In 1953, he returned to Japan, now 55 years old.

=== Postwar career ===
Upon his return, Uchida worked primarily for the Toei studio. His post-war reputation relies mostly on his jidaigeki films, starting with Bloody Spear at Mount Fuji (1955), a "well-judged blend of comedy and violence and […] criticism of feudal values" (Jacoby), "[b]oth progressive and nostalgic, humanistic and nationalistic, peaceful and violent" (Craig Watts).

He followed with two contemporary dramas, shot for Shintoho and Nikkatsu, respectively. Twilight Saloon (Tasogare Sakaba, 1955), its setting restricted to a tavern over the course of one evening, presented a microcosm of post-war Japanese society and how some of its members dealt with the past war, while in the same year's A Hole of My Own Making, the story of a disintegrating family was mixed with criticism of a Japan which, as one character states, has become an unofficial colony of the US. Between the period films Swords in the Moonlight (1957) and Chikamatu's Love in Osaka (1959), Uchida made yet another contemporary drama, The Outsiders (Mori to Mizuumi no Matsuri), about the indigenous minority of Ainu on Hokkaido island. The Master Spearman (Sake to Onna to Yari), Hero of the Red-Light District (Yoto Monogatari: Hana no Yoshiwara Hyakunin Giri, both 1960), and The Mad Fox (1962) again were period dramas, the latter distinguished by its expressionist sets and colours.

A Fugitive from the Past (1965) has repeatedly been cited as Uchida's masterpiece. A "monumental crime thriller" (Jasper Sharp) set in post-war Japan between 1947 and 1957, it follows a man who grew up in poverty and wants to start a new life with money derived from a murder. The film, shot on 16 mm film and blown up to 35 mm to achieve a grainy effect, received numerous national film awards and was included in Kinema Junpo's "critics top 200" list. Uchida left Toei protesting the distribution of a shortened version of the film without his approval, but later returned to the company to direct Jinsei Gekijō: Hishakaku to Kiratsune (1968).

Uchida died in 1970 of cancer.

== Legacy ==
A retrospective on Uchida's work was presented at the Tokyo FILMeX in 2004.

Retrospectives on Uchida in the US have been held at the Berkeley Art Museum and Pacific Film Archive in 2007 and in the Museum of Modern Art in 2016.

== Selected filmography ==
- Ikeru Ningyo (lit. "Living Dolls") (1929, lost film)
- Adauchi Senshu (lit. "Vengeful Player") (1931, lost film)
- Policeman (Keisatsukan) (1933)
- Jinsei Gekijō (lit. "Theatre of Life") (1936, partially extant)
- Kagirinaki Zenshin (lit. "Limitless Advance") (1937)
- Hadaka no Machi (lit. "Naked Town") (1937, lost film)
- Earth (1939, partially extant)
- Bloody Spear at Mount Fuji (Chiyari Fuji) (1955)
- A Hole of My Own Making (Jibun no Ana no Nakade) (1955)
- Twilight Saloon (Tasogare Sakaba) (1955)
- The Kuroda Affair (Kuroda Sōdō) (1956)
- The Horse Boy (Abarenbo Kaido) (1957)
- Swords in the Moonlight a.k.a. The Great Bodhisattva Pass (1957)
- The Outsiders (Mori to Mizuumi no Matsuri) (1958)
- Chikamatsu’s Love in Osaka (Naniwa no Koi no Monogatari) (1959)
- Hero of the Red-Light District a.k.a. Yoshiwara: The Pleasure Quarter or Killing in Yoshiwara (1960)
- The Master Spearman (Sake to Onna to Yari) (1960)
- Miyamoto Musashi (1961)
- The Mad Fox a.k.a. Love, Thy Name Be Sorrow (Koiya Koi Nasuna Koi) (1962)
- Miyamoto Musashi II: Showdown at Hannyazaka Heights (Miyamoto Musashi Han'nya-zaka no Ketto) (1962)
- Miyamoto Musashi III: Birth of the Two Sword Style (Miyamoto Musashi Nitōryū Kaigan) (1963)
- Miyamoto Musashi IV: Duel at Ichijo-ji Temple (Miyamoto Musashi Ichijō-ji no Kettō) (1964)
- A Fugitive from the Past (Kiga Kaikyō) (1965)
- Miyamoto Musashi V: Duel at Ganryu Island (Miyamoto Musashi Ganryū-jima no Kettō) (1965)
