= My Week with Marilyn =

2011 film directed by Simon Curtis

- Theatrical release poster
- Directed by: Simon Curtis
- Screenplay by: Adrian Hodges
- Based on: The Prince, The Showgirl, and Me and My Week with Marilyn by Colin Clark
- Produced by: David Parfitt; Harvey Weinstein
- Starring: Michelle Williams; Kenneth Branagh; Eddie Redmayne; Dominic Cooper; Julia Ormond; Zoë Wanamaker; Emma Watson; Judi Dench
- Cinematography: Ben Smithard
- Edited by: Adam Recht
- Music by: Conrad Pope
- Production companies: Trademark Films; BBC Films; LipSync Productions; The Weinstein Company
- Distributed by: Entertainment Film Distributors (UK); The Weinstein Company (US)
- Release dates: 9 October 2011 (NYFF); 23 November 2011 (US); 25 November 2011 (UK)
- Running time: 99 minutes
- Countries: United Kingdom; United States
- Language: English
- Budget: $10 million
- Box office: $35 million

My Week with Marilyn is a 2011 biographical drama film directed by Simon Curtis and written by Adrian Hodges. It stars Michelle Williams, Kenneth Branagh, Eddie Redmayne, Dominic Cooper, Julia Ormond, Emma Watson, and Judi Dench. Based on two books by Colin Clark, it depicts the making of the 1957 film The Prince and the Showgirl, which starred Marilyn Monroe (Williams) and Laurence Olivier (Branagh). The film concerns the week during the shooting of the film when Monroe was escorted around London by Clark (Redmayne), after her husband Arthur Miller (Dougray Scott) had returned to the United States.

Principal photography began on 4 October 2010, at Pinewood Studios. Filming took place at Saltwood Castle, White Waltham Airfield, and on locations in and around London. Curtis also used the same studio in which Monroe had shot The Prince and the Showgirl in 1956. My Week with Marilyn had its world premiere at the 2011 New York Film Festival on 9 October, and was shown at the Mill Valley Film Festival two days later. The film was released on 23 November 2011, in the United States by The Weinstein Company, and on 25 November in the United Kingdom by Entertainment Film Distributors.

The film received generally positive reviews and grossed $35 million worldwide. Williams and Branagh were nominated for the Academy Awards for Best Actress and Best Supporting Actor respectively.

== Plot ==
Following his graduation from Christ Church, Oxford, in 1956, aspiring filmmaker Colin Clark travels to London to gain a job on Laurence Olivier's next production. Production manager Hugh Perceval tells Colin that there are no jobs available, but he decides to wait for Olivier, whom he once met at a party. Olivier and his wife, Vivien Leigh, eventually arrive and Vivien encourages Olivier to give Colin a job on his upcoming film The Prince and the Showgirl, starring Marilyn Monroe. Colin's first task is to find a suitable residence for Marilyn and her husband, Arthur Miller, the leading playwright, while they are in England. The press discover the house, but Colin reveals he secured a second house just in case, impressing Olivier and Marilyn's publicist, Arthur P. Jacobs.

The paparazzi find out about Marilyn's arrival at Heathrow and they gather around the aircraft when it lands. Marilyn brings Arthur, her business partner, Milton H. Greene, and her acting coach, Paula Strasberg, with her. Marilyn is initially uncomfortable around the many photographers but relaxes at the press conference. Olivier becomes frustrated when Marilyn is late for a read-through. She insists Paula sit with her, and when she has trouble with her lines, Paula reads them for her. The crew and the other actors, including Sybil Thorndike, are in awe of Marilyn. Colin meets Lucy, a wardrobe assistant to whom he is attracted, and they go on a date. Marilyn starts arriving later to the set and often forgets her lines, angering Olivier. However, Sybil praises Marilyn and defends her when Olivier tries to get her to apologise for delaying the shoot.

Marilyn struggles to understand her character and leaves the set when Olivier insults her. Colin asks Olivier to be more sympathetic towards Marilyn before he goes to Parkside House to check on her. He hears an argument and finds a tearful Marilyn sitting on the stairs with Arthur's notebook, which contains the plot of a new play in which Arthur seems to mock her. Arthur later returns to the United States. Vivien comes to the set and watches some of Marilyn's scenes, then argues with her husband. She breaks down, saying that Marilyn lights up the screen and that she wishes Olivier could see himself when he watches her. Olivier tries unsuccessfully to reassure his wife. Marilyn does not show up to the set following Arthur's departure and she asks Colin to come to Parkside, where they have a talk. The crew becomes captivated by Marilyn when she dances for a scene, during which Milton pulls Colin aside to tell him that Marilyn breaks hearts and that she will break his too. Lucy also notices Colin's growing infatuation with Marilyn and breaks up with him.

Colin and Marilyn spend the day together and are given a tour of the library of Windsor Castle by Owen Morshead. Colin also shows Marilyn around Eton College, and they go skinny dipping in the River Thames. Marilyn kisses Colin and they are found by Roger Smith, Marilyn's bodyguard. Colin is called to Parkside one night as Marilyn has locked herself in her room, having taken several sleeping pills. Colin enters her room and Marilyn invites him to lie next to her on the bed. The following night, Marilyn wakes up in pain and claims she is having a miscarriage. A doctor tends to her. Marilyn tells Colin that Arthur is coming back and that she wants to try being a good wife to him, so she and Colin should forget everything that happened between them. She later returns to the set to complete the film. Olivier praises Marilyn but reveals she has killed his desire to direct again. Lucy asks Colin if Marilyn broke his heart and he replies that she did "a little", to which she replies that he needed it. Marilyn comes to a local pub, where Colin is staying, and thanks him for helping her. She kisses him goodbye and Roger drives her to the airport.

== Cast ==
- Michelle Williams as Marilyn Monroe
- Kenneth Branagh as Laurence Olivier
- Eddie Redmayne as Colin Clark
- Emma Watson as Lucy Armstrong
- Judi Dench as Sybil Thorndike
- Dominic Cooper as Milton H. Greene
- Philip Jackson as Roger Smith
- Derek Jacobi as Owen Morshead
- Toby Jones as Arthur P. Jacobs
- Michael Kitchen as Hugh Perceval
- Julia Ormond as Vivien Leigh
- Simon Russell Beale as Cotes-Preedy
- Dougray Scott as Arthur Miller
- Zoë Wanamaker as Paula Strasberg

== Production ==
=== Development ===
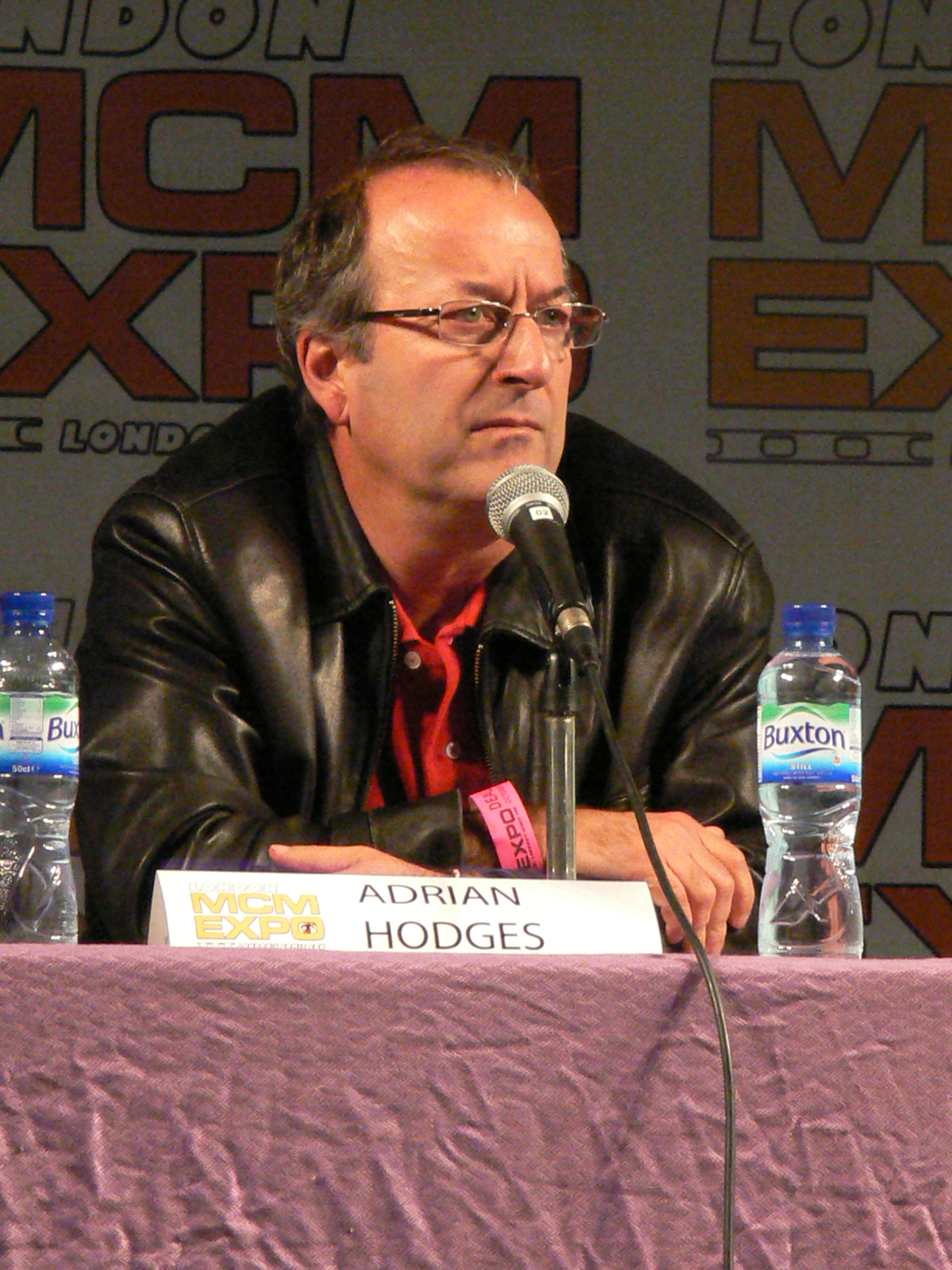
Adrian Hodges wrote the screenplay.

My Week with Marilyn is based on Colin Clark's The Prince, The Showgirl, and Me (1995) and My Week with Marilyn (2000); two diary accounts, which document his time on the set of the 1957 film The Prince and the Showgirl and the time he spent with Monroe. After reading the two books in 2004, Simon Curtis approached producer David Parfitt about making a film based upon them. Parfitt said everyone liked the idea, but because Monroe is so familiar and iconic to people, they wondered what was left to say. Adrian Hodges, who wrote the screenplay, told David Gritten of The Daily Telegraph: "If you'd said to me one day I'd write a film about her, I'd have been amazed, because I wouldn't have known where to start." Gritten reported the saving grace for Hodges was that Clark's books were written about Monroe at a specific time.

Curtis and Parfitt pitched the project to BBC Films and the UK Film Council and they put up the money for development. They then had to wait for eighteen months while Parfitt negotiated the rights to the books with Clark's estate. The producer and director had to wait a further six months for Hodges's screenplay. Once it was ready, a search for finance and a cast began. Curtis went to Harvey Weinstein and told him about his idea for making a film based on Clark's books. Weinstein told Michael Hogan of The Huffington Post that he had read the books for fun, but had not then considered them for adaptation into a film. He read Hodges's script, which he described as "quite good", charming and fun. Weinstein chose to finance My Week with Marilyn as he was keen to work with Michelle Williams again, following Blue Valentine. The film is produced by Trademark Films and is also financed by LipSync Productions. My Week with Marilyn marked Curtis's feature film debut.

=== Casting ===
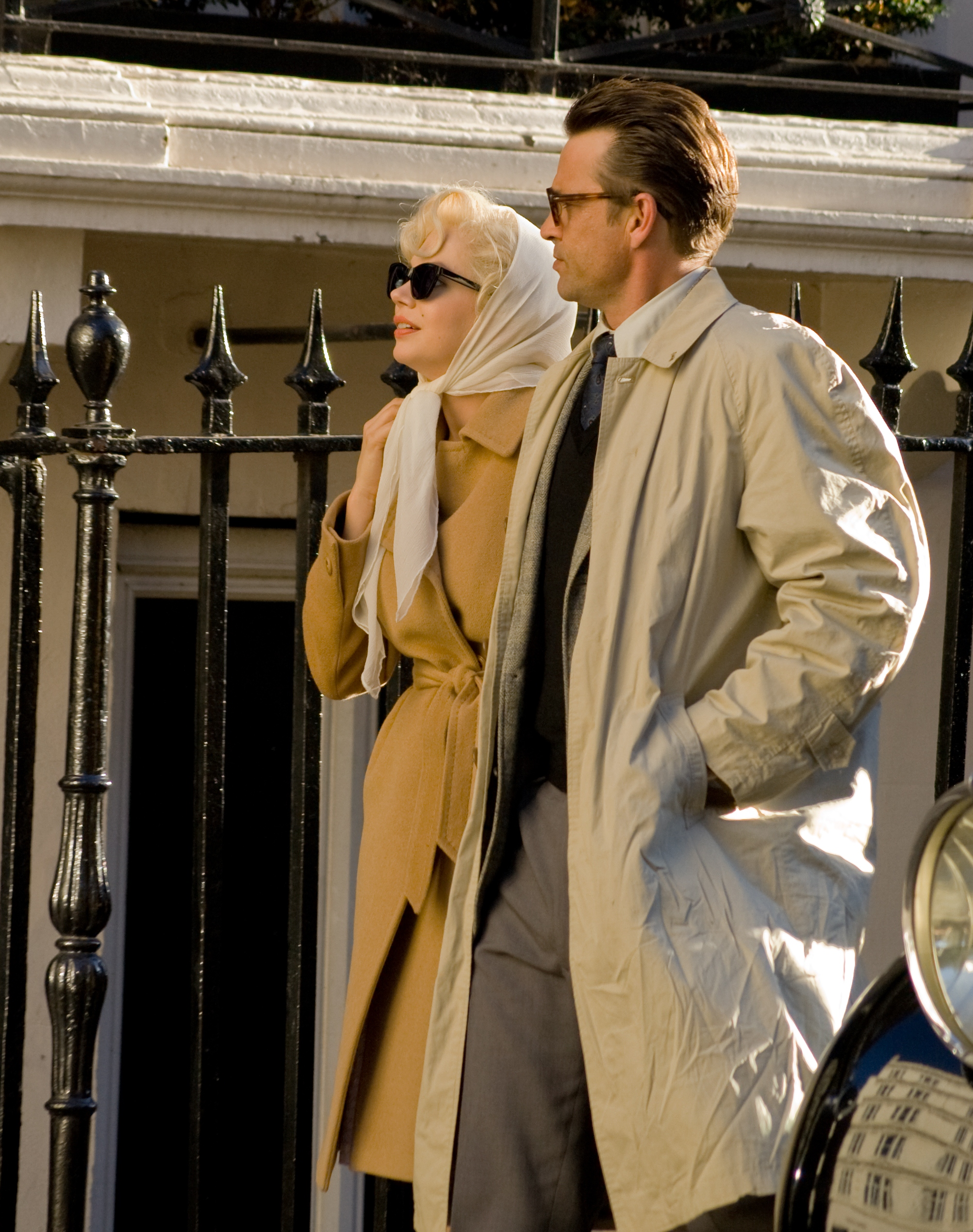
Michelle Williams as Marilyn Monroe and Dougray Scott as Arthur Miller on set in Mayfair, London

Michelle Williams was the only actress that producers met with during the casting process and Curtis said she was the only actress he had sought for the role. She committed to My Week with Marilyn two years before production began. Williams told Adam Green of Vogue that the notion of portraying Monroe was daunting, but as she finished reading the script, she knew she wanted the role. She then spent six months reading biographies, diaries, letters, poems, and notes about and from Monroe. She also looked at photographs, watched her films, and listened to recordings. Williams had to gain weight for the role, and she worked with a choreographer to help perfect Monroe's walking.

In September, it was announced that Eddie Redmayne had been cast as Clark. Parfitt commented that finding an actor for the role had been difficult. He said "It's a devilishly tricky part to find the right person for because Colin went to Eton, studied at Oxford and flew for the RAF." That same month, it was also announced that Emma Watson had been cast in the small role of wardrobe assistant, Lucy. Watson was scheduled to spend only a few days on set shooting her scenes to prevent her studies at Brown University from being interrupted. Kenneth Branagh began talks with producers for the role of Laurence Olivier in July 2010 after Ralph Fiennes had to drop out to direct his adaptation of Coriolanus. Branagh was later cast in the role.

Dominic Cooper was given the role of Milton H. Greene, a photographer and Monroe's business partner. Of Greene, Cooper said, "He was quite an old man, but they had a very close relationship. I think Marilyn felt very supported by him in the beginning. But ultimately he became her agent and business partner, which is rather a lot." Cooper filmed his scenes in between his work on Captain America: The First Avenger. Catherine Zeta-Jones was offered the role of actress Vivien Leigh. But Zeta-Jones turned down the role as she did not want to spend more than a week away from her husband Michael Douglas, who was being treated for throat cancer at the time. Curtis and the producers began auditioning other actresses and they ultimately cast Julia Ormond in the role. Ormond's casting was announced at the same time as Dougray Scott's, who portrays Arthur Miller. Derek Jacobi was cast as Sir Owen Morshead, the royal librarian at Windsor Castle, Philip Jackson plays Monroe's private detective and Judi Dench plays Sybil Thorndike. Zoë Wanamaker is Paula Strasberg, Monroe's acting consultant and Richard Clifford was cast as Richard Wattis. The film's cast also includes Toby Jones, Geraldine Somerville, Simon Russell Beale and Michael Kitchen. It was announced on 8 October 2010, that casting for the film had been completed.

=== Filming ===
Principal photography on My Week with Marilyn commenced on 19 September 2010. Dench filmed her scenes during that month as she had to go to India to start working on The Best Exotic Marigold Hotel. Filming took place at Pinewood Studios in Buckinghamshire from 4 October 2010. Three days later, White Waltham Airfield was turned into a 1950s London Heathrow Airport to recreate the moment when Monroe arrived in England to begin production on The Prince and the Showgirl. Curtis used the studio in which Monroe shot The Prince and the Showgirl in 1956 to film scenes for My Week with Marilyn. Williams was given the same dressing room Monroe had used at the time of her shoot. Filming also took place on locations in and around London. One such location included Parkside House in the village of Englefield Green, where Monroe and Miller lived during their stay in Britain. The film's production designer, Donal Woods, toured the house with Curtis prior to filming and noticed the exterior looked much as it did when Monroe posed for some publicity shots there fifty years ago.

British Cinematographer reported the production had filmed scenes at Saltwood Castle, near Folkestone, where Clark grew up as a young boy. The film was also shot at Eton College, which Clark attended, and outside Windsor Castle for a few hours during one Saturday morning. Cinematographer Ben Smithard said the creative and visual references in My Week with Marilyn came from stills of American photographer and painter, Saul Leiter. Smithard told British Cinematographer that a significant amount of time was spent in pre-production. He said "On an historic film like this, you need to do as much prep as you can get. It's like a history lesson, and you can learn about a point in time." The cinematographer framed My Week with Marilyn in the standard anamorphic format as it is "very good for personal stories" and suited the film. He added that it is easy to frame two actors, but the format is not so good for architectural features. Principal photography on My Week with Marilyn lasted seven weeks and wrapped in November 2010. Post-production lasted from 28 November 2010 to 31 August 2011.

=== Costumes and make-up ===
"Looking more closely at it she was the Calvin Klein girl before there was Calvin Klein because she was way ahead of her time in her personal styling. During that period women were much more, in their everyday life, put together and she was very casual, very simple. I think she dressed for comfort. I wanted to bring that to the film, that she had a simplicity, an ease about her and a casualness, which obviously she didn't in her professional life."

— Costume designer Jill Taylor speaking to InStyle about Monroe

The costume designer for My Week with Marilyn was Jill Taylor. Taylor, who previously worked on Sliding Doors (1998) and Match Point (2005), created the costumes for the film in six weeks and she dressed the entire cast. She sourced many of the items from vintage shops, auction houses and markets. Speaking to Estella Shardlow of Vintage Seekers, Taylor said "I trawled through loads and loads of antiques fairs and vintage shops to see if we could find original vintage pieces that would suffice for the film. We were pretty successful but we also had to reproduce a lot from original photographs – for example, we had to do the scene where she lands in this country, which is well-documented on newsreel." Taylor told Shardlow it was difficult to find fabrics that looked as 'lush' as they did in the fifties and she had some challenging costumes to make, including a dress from The Prince and the Showgirl for Dench's character, Sybil Thorndike. The designer also said she had to make some adaptations to a suit worn by Ormond, as she is a completely different body shape to her character, Vivien Leigh. During research for Watson's character, Lucy, Taylor found an original photograph of the cast and crew of The Prince and the Showgirl. One of the girls in the picture was wearing a tartan dress, so Taylor went out and found Watson an original tartan dress to wear. She said she and her team had fun with Watson's character, as she is a young and fashion-conscious girl. The designer said "Given the American influence to England in the 1950s, her style is quite Sandra Dee and girlie."

Taylor told Sarah Smith of InStyle that she worked from many photographs of Monroe, particularly ones taken on her honeymoon with Miller. Taylor said she drew upon a certain picture of the actress wearing a man's shirt and a pencil skirt and she made the outfit for the film. Taylor added "There was also one scene when [Michelle as Marilyn] is in a car and she's got a black chiffon headscarf and there was a coat I did for her that was actually in the Sotheby's catalogue. We reproduced that coat, which was like an oatmeal silk coat with a black velvet collar, and we made it into a jacket for Michelle, rather than a coat." Taylor also worked with Williams during the design process and she explained the actress would bring picture references for her. Taylor would do sketches for Williams as they talked and the designer said "it was a collaboration about what she thought she would like to wear and what I thought." The designer told Smith she was very pleased with how successful the white dress she had made for Williams during The Prince and the Showgirl scenes turned out. Taylor used a fitting photograph of Monroe with The Prince and the Showgirl costume designer to help her make the garment. She explained that the dress was quite intricate to make and there were no doubles, so Williams had to wear the same dress for eleven days. Taylor worried that something would happen to the dress and was relieved when the shoot was over. When asked if Williams had a favourite outfit, Taylor said the actress particularly enjoyed wearing a black dress and the skirt and shirt combination.

The hair and make-up designer for the film was Jenny Shircore. She told Joe Nazzaro of Make-Up Artist Magazine that the biggest challenge for her was transforming Williams into Monroe. Shircore said Williams' features are quite different from Monroe's, but she did not want to use prosthetics to shape her face as the emotion Williams was conveying in her performance had to come through the make-up. Shircore explained "There are times in the film when she's actually wearing very little make-up but we still kept tiny aspects of Marilyn, such as the eyebrows, the shading and the shape of the lips, so we would keep three or four major points that helped us towards Marilyn. Some of it was quite difficult, because Michelle's eyes are completely different. Marilyn had very distinctive eyelids, so we had to try and form that shape on Michelle's eyes by the use of light and shade." The make-up artist said most of the scenes in the film see the actors from The Prince and the Showgirl in their film make-up, so Shircore had to copy the original scene for My Week with Marilyn and get it right. She also revealed a few minor prosthetics were used on some cast members to help recreate the characters. Shircore told Nazzaro "I'm not going to give them away, but they are things that make a difference and they're all beautifully conceived, produced and worn by the actors."

=== Music ===
The film's original score was composed by American composer Conrad Pope. French composer Alexandre Desplat wrote a piece titled "Marilyn's Theme", which Pope adapted into his score. Pianist Lang Lang is a featured performer on several of Pope and Desplat's compositions. Williams also features on the soundtrack singing "I Found a Dream", "That Old Black Magic" and a medley of "When Love Goes Wrong, Nothing Goes Right" and "Heat Wave". Other songs include "Autumn Leaves" and "Memories Are Made of This". The soundtrack was released digitally on 8 November 2011.

== Release ==
The first trailer for the film was introduced by Harvey Weinstein during the 2011 Cannes Film Festival. It was officially released on 6 October 2011. My Week with Marilyn had its world premiere on 9 October 2011 at the 49th New York Film Festival. The film was shown at the Mill Valley Film Festival two days later and it was then added to the lineups of the Hamptons International Film Festival and the 26th Annual Fort Lauderdale International Film Festival.

My Week with Marilyn was the centerpiece presentation at the 47th Chicago International Film Festival and it was shown at the Wooburn Festival in High Wycombe on 17 October. It was later screened at the Philadelphia Film Festival and AFI Fest. My Week with Marilyn was shown out of competition at the Rome Film Festival and it closed the Dubai International Film Festival on 13 December. It was then shown at the Capri Hollywood International Film Festival in January 2012.

My Week with Marilyn was released on 25 November in the United Kingdom. The film was originally scheduled to be released on 4 November in the United States, but shortly after its premiere at the New York Film Festival, The Weinstein Company moved the release date to 23 November. The film opened in a limited release in 73 markets and 244 theaters. During this time period, an exclusive 7-minute director's cut of the Katy Perry music video, "The One That Got Away", was shown with select advanced screenings of the film for one night only on 11 November. On 17 February 2012, Kristina Bustos of Digital Spy reported My Week with Marilyn would expand into 600 more theatres across the United States on 24 February.

=== Home media ===
My Week with Marilyn was released on DVD and blu-ray disc on 13 March 2012 in the United States and on 16 March in the United Kingdom. It was released in Australia on 21 June 2012. The film is distributed by The Weinstein Company and Anchor Bay Entertainment, while in South Africa, it was distributed by Ster-Kinekor Entertainment. Extras include a director's commentary and a featurette called "The Untold Story of an American Icon". My Week with Marilyn entered the UK DVD Top 40 at number six and the Blu-ray Top 40 at number nine. On its first week of release in the US, the film entered at number six on the DVD Sales Chart, selling an estimated 172,748 DVDs making $2,589,493.

== Reception ==
=== Box office ===
My Week with Marilyn earned £749,819 upon its opening weekend in the United Kingdom. The film opened to 397 cinemas and landed at number three in the UK box office top ten. The following week the film earned £483,239 and slipped three places in the box office chart. In its third week, My Week with Marilyn earned £192,834 and fell to number seven. In the first five days of its opening in limited release, My Week with Marilyn grossed $2.06 million in the United States. Ray Suber of Box Office Mojo reported the film played at 123 locations on 23 and 24 November, before expanding to 244 cinemas for the Thanksgiving three-day weekend, where it placed in the Top 12 with $1.75 million. Amy Kaufman of the Los Angeles Times said 71% of people who saw My Week with Marilyn during its opening few days in the US were over the age of 35. In January 2012, six weeks after it was released, My Week with Marilyn broke the $10 million mark in cinemas.

=== Critical reception ===
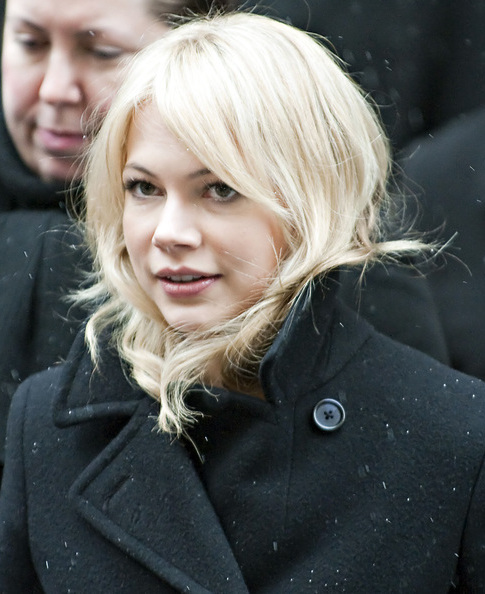
Michelle Williams' portrayal of Marilyn Monroe garnered critical acclaim, earning her a nomination for the Academy Award for Best Actress.

My Week with Marilyn received generally positive reviews from critics, with Williams' performance receiving acclaim. Review aggregator Rotten Tomatoes reports that 82% of 187 critics have given the film a positive review, with a rating average of 7.10/10. According to the site's summary of the critical consensus, "Michelle Williams shines in My Week with Marilyn, capturing the magnetism and vulnerability of Marilyn Monroe." On Metacritic, the film holds a score of 65 out of 100, based on 38 reviews, indicating "generally favorable reviews". Audiences surveyed by CinemaScore gave the film an average grade of "A−" on an A+ to F scale.

David Rooney from The Hollywood Reporter praised Williams' performance and said she nailed Monroe's vocal style. Rooney also praised Redmayne as Clark, saying his scenes with Williams were captivating. However, Rooney went on to say "Fault lies with both Hodges' workmanlike script and Curtis' failure to excavate much psychological depth." He added My Week with Marilyn is starchy and short on perspective, making it "superficial showbiz pageantry." Ronnie Scheib of Variety said My Week with Marilyn "flits uneasily between arch drawing-room comedy and foreshadowed tragedy" and is too stagily directed by Curtis, who lines up the characters with "no attention to spatial logic or rhythmic flow." Scheib added the film coasts on Williams' performance, while the story feels like it has been ripped from film fan magazines of the time. Rex Reed of The New York Observer called My Week with Marilyn "pure perfection."

Adam Green of Vogue said the film does not quite reach "the high drama and urgency of a period piece like The King's Speech", but it does evoke a vanished era in filmmaking. Green added Williams is the main attraction and she brings Monroe to life "with heartbreaking delicacy and precision without resorting to impersonation or cliché." Regina Weinreich of The Huffington Post called My Week with Marilyn a "gem" and said the story "manages to convey so much of Marilyn, particularly her child-like vulnerability, her insecurity as an actress, her natural charm and talents. While we have seen Michelle Williams tap dance and heard her sing before -- she was superb in last year's Blue Valentine -- her moves and voice as Marilyn evoke the subject's understated, magnetic performances." Weinreich went on to praise the rest of the cast, including Redmayne, Branagh and Dench, saying they are "especially good." A writer for indieWire said My Week with Marilyn is like a "superficial Lifetime made for TV-movie." The writer went on to say the film is not terrible, but there is "very little meat on the bone." They added the film has a terrific cast who do their best with an average script. Robbie Collin, writing for The Daily Telegraph gave the film three out of five stars and said "Michelle Williams makes a mesmeric Monroe in My Week With Marilyn, but the film falls disappointingly short on boop-boop-be-doo."

The Miami Herald's Rene Rodriguez gave the film three out of four stars. He said "One of the chief pleasures of My Week with Marilyn — which should not be approached as anything other than fluffy entertainment — is watching Williams bring to life Monroe's inner demons and her movie-star allure with equal aplomb." The New Yorker's film critic David Denby also praised Williams' performance as Monroe, saying "In My Week with Marilyn, Williams makes the star come alive. She has Monroe's walk, the easy, swivelling neck, the face that responds to everything like a flower swaying in the breeze. Most important, she has the sexual sweetness and the hurt, lost look that shifts, in a flash, into resistance and tears." The critic called the film "charming and touching" and said it is expertly made. Writing for Time, Mary Pols called My Week with Marilyn "nothing more than a lively confection." Pols went on to say "Williams locates a central truth, the contradictory allure of this utterly impossible woman — mercurial, vain, foolish, but also intelligent in some very primal way and achingly vulnerable." Upon giving the film three and a half out of four stars, critic Roger Ebert said "What matters is the performance by Michelle Williams. She evokes so many Marilyns, public and private, real and make-believe. We didn't know Monroe, but we believe she must have been something like this. We're probably looking at one of this year's Oscar nominees."

Manohla Dargis of The New York Times thought Branagh was miscast as Olivier, but she said he made up for that with "his crisp, at times clipped, enunciation and a physical performance that gives Olivier enough vitality so that when, early in, the character sweeps into his production office with his wife, Vivien Leigh (Julia Ormond, a wan placeholder for the original), he dazzles Clark and jolts this slow-stirring movie awake." Of Williams, the film critic said she "tries her best, and sometimes that's almost enough." Dargis said the main problem is with Hodges' script, which "offers a catalog of Monroe stereotypes." Stella Papamichael of Digital Spy gave the film four out of five stars and she praised many of the cast's performances. Papamichael added "While you won't learn anything new about Marilyn Monroe, you can revel in the silky feel of nostalgia." Empire magazine's Angie Errigo gave My Week with Marilyn three out of five stars and she said "At moments hilarious and others touching, it's a sweet, slight affair, more pretty pageant than pithy biographical drama. Expect awards nominations to stack up for Williams and Branagh." The Wall Street Journal's film critic, Joe Morgenstern was negative about the film saying, "When bad movies happen to good people, the first place to look for an explanation is the basic idea. That certainly applies to My Week with Marilyn, a dubious idea done in by Adrian Hodges's shallow script and Simon Curtis's clumsy direction." Nishi Tiwari of Rediff.com said Williams is "a fascinating watch", but there is nothing about Monroe in the film that we did not know already.

=== Accolades ===
For her performances in My Week with Marilyn, Meek's Cutoff and Take This Waltz, Williams was given the Best Actress award at the 2011 Hollywood Film Festival. On 25 November 2011, it was announced Williams would receive the 2012 Desert Palm Achievement Actress Award from the Palm Springs International Film Festival in recognition of her performance in My Week with Marilyn. Four days later, Williams was nominated for Best Female Lead at the Independent Spirit Awards and Best Actress at the New York Film Critics Circle Awards. Williams and Branagh were nominated for Best Actress in a Drama Motion Picture and Best Supporting Actor respectively at the Satellite Awards. Williams was named Best Actress by the Washington D.C. Area Film Critics Association. Branagh earned a nomination for Best Supporting Actor. On 11 December, Williams won the Boston Society of Film Critics Award for Best Actress. She also won the Best Actress award from the Detroit Film Critics Society, while Branagh garnered a nomination for Best Supporting Actor.

The Broadcast Film Critics Association nominated Williams and Branagh for Best Actress and Best Supporting Actor respectively. Taylor and Shircore each received a nomination for Best Costume Design and Best Make-up. Williams, Branagh and the film gathered nominations for Best Actress, Best Supporting Actor and Best Film from the Phoenix Film Critics Society. On 1 January 2012, the cast was awarded the Capri Ensemble Cast Award from the Capri, Hollywood International Film Festival. Williams won the Best Actress in a Motion Picture – Comedy or Musical award at the 69th Golden Globe Awards. While the film and Branagh each received a nomination. My Week with Marilyn garnered seven nominations at the 65th British Academy Film Awards. Williams received a nomination for Best Actress at the 84th Academy Awards, while Branagh earned a nomination for Best Supporting Actor.
