= Lincoln (film) =

2012 film by Steven Spielberg

- Theatrical release poster
- Directed by: Steven Spielberg
- Screenplay by: Tony Kushner
- Based on: Team of Rivals; 2005 book by Doris Kearns Goodwin
- Produced by: Steven Spielberg; Kathleen Kennedy
- Starring: Daniel Day-Lewis; Sally Field; David Strathairn; Joseph Gordon-Levitt; James Spader; Hal Holbrook; Tommy Lee Jones
- Cinematography: Janusz Kamiński
- Edited by: Michael Kahn
- Music by: John Williams
- Production companies: DreamWorks Pictures; 20th Century Fox; Reliance Entertainment; Participant Media; Dune Entertainment; Amblin Entertainment; The Kennedy/Marshall Company (Note: DreamWorks Pictures, 20th Century Fox, and Reliance Entertainment are credited as the presenters for Lincoln; Participant Media and Dune Entertainment are credited as co-financers and co-production companies for the film, while Amblin Entertainment and The Kennedy/Marshall Company are credited as the production companies, attributed to multiple sources:)
- Distributed by: Walt Disney Studios Motion Pictures (Note: Distributed by Walt Disney Studios Motion Pictures through the Touchstone Pictures banner.) (United States and Canada); 20th Century Fox (International)
- Release dates: October 8, 2012 (NYFF); November 16, 2012 (United States)
- Running time: 150 minutes
- Country: United States (Note: Attributed to multiple sources:)
- Language: English
- Budget: $65 million
- Box office: $275.3 million

Lincoln is a 2012 American biographical film directed and produced by Steven Spielberg, starring Daniel Day-Lewis as United States President Abraham Lincoln. The film features Sally Field, David Strathairn, Joseph Gordon-Levitt, James Spader, Hal Holbrook, and Tommy Lee Jones in supporting roles. Its screenplay by Tony Kushner was loosely based on Doris Kearns Goodwin's 2005 biography Team of Rivals: The Political Genius of Abraham Lincoln and covers the final four months of Lincoln's life. The film focuses on President Lincoln's efforts in January 1865 to abolish slavery and involuntary servitude by having the Thirteenth Amendment to the United States Constitution passed by the United States House of Representatives.

Lincoln was produced by Spielberg and frequent collaborator Kathleen Kennedy, through their respective production companies, Amblin Entertainment and the Kennedy/Marshall Company. Filming began October 17, 2011, and ended on December 19 that year. It premiered on October 8, 2012, at the 50th New York Film Festival. The film was distributed theatrically by Walt Disney Studios Motion Pictures through the Touchstone Pictures label in the United States and Canada on November 16, 2012, and by 20th Century Fox in international territories.

Lincoln was acclaimed by critics, who lauded its acting (especially Day-Lewis'), Spielberg's direction, and its production values. It was nominated for seven Golden Globe Awards, including Best Motion Picture – Drama, Best Director, and winning Best Actor (Motion Picture – Drama) for Day-Lewis. At the 85th Academy Awards, it received twelve nominations, including Best Picture and Best Director; it won for Best Production Design and Best Actor for Day-Lewis, his third in the category. It was also a commercial success, grossing over $275 million at the box office. It has since been ranked as one of the best films of Spielberg's career.

== Plot ==
In January 1865, US President Abraham Lincoln expects the American Civil War to end soon, with the defeat of the Confederate States Army. He is concerned that his 1863 Emancipation Proclamation may be discarded by the courts after the war and that the proposed Thirteenth Amendment will be defeated by the returning slave states. He feels it is imperative to pass the amendment beforehand, to foreclose any possibility that freed slaves might be re-enslaved.

The Radical Republicans fear the amendment will be defeated by some who wish to delay its passage; support from Republicans in the states is not yet assured. The amendment also requires the support of several Democratic congressmen in order for it to pass. With dozens of Democrats being lame ducks after losing their re-election campaigns in 1864, some of Lincoln's advisors recommend waiting for a new Republican nominated Congress.

Lincoln relies on Francis Preston Blair, a founder of the Republican Party, to influence members of the state conservative faction to vote for the anti-slavery amendment. Blair in turn insists that Lincoln allow him to engage the Confederate government in peace negotiations, knowing his two sons will once again be in danger after the spring thaw permits renewed military operations. While Lincoln knows such negotiations would anger the Radical Republicans, he needs to support the slavery amendment; he also cannot proceed without Blair's support and reluctantly authorizes the peace mission. Lincoln and Secretary of State William H. Seward also need to secure Democratic votes for the amendment and Lincoln suggests they concentrate on the lame-ducks who will feel less restricted so as to vote independently. Lincoln also authorizes agents to offer federal jobs to the soon to be unemployed Democratic congressmen.

Robert Todd Lincoln, the eldest son of President Lincoln and First Lady Mary Todd Lincoln, returns from Harvard Law School and announces his intention to discontinue his studies and enlist in the Union army. He hopes to earn a measure of honor and respect outside of his father's shadow. The President reluctantly secures an officer's commission for him. His wife fears their son will be killed and urges her husband to pass the amendment and end the war.

At a critical moment in the debate in the United States House of Representatives, racial-equality advocate Thaddeus Stevens agrees to moderate his position and argue that the amendment represents only legal equality between the races, not a declaration of actual equality. Confederate envoys ready to meet with Lincoln are instructed to remain outside of Washington, D.C. as the amendment approaches a vote on the House floor.

Rumors of the peace envoy circulate, prompting both Democrats and conservative Republicans to advocate postponing the vote. In a carefully worded statement, Lincoln denies there are envoys in Washington, and the vote passes by a margin of two votes. Black visitors to the gallery celebrate, and Stevens returns home to his "housekeeper" and lover, a biracial woman named Lydia Hamilton Smith.

When Lincoln meets with the Confederates, he tells them that slavery cannot be restored, as the North is united for ratification of the amendment, and several of the southern states' reconstructed legislatures would also vote to ratify. As a result, the peace negotiations fail, and the war continues. On April 3, Lincoln visits the battlefield at Petersburg, Virginia and speaks with Lieutenant General Ulysses S. Grant. On April 9, Grant receives General Robert E. Lee's surrender at Appomattox Courthouse. On April 14, Lincoln meets members of his cabinet to discuss future measures to enfranchise blacks, before leaving for Ford's Theatre. That night, while Lincoln's son Tad is watching a play at Grover's Theatre, the manager stops the play to announce that the President has been shot.

The next morning, at the Petersen House, Lincoln dies with a peaceful expression across his face. In a flashback, he finishes reciting his second inaugural address on March 4 with the words, "With malice toward none, with charity for all".

== Cast ==
- Daniel Day-Lewis as President Abraham Lincoln
- Sally Field as First Lady Mary Todd Lincoln
- David Strathairn as Secretary of State William H. Seward
- Joseph Gordon-Levitt as Robert Todd Lincoln
- James Spader as William N. Bilbo
- Hal Holbrook as Francis Preston Blair
- Tommy Lee Jones as Republican Congressman Thaddeus Stevens.
- John Hawkes as Colonel Robert Latham
- Jackie Earle Haley as Confederate States Vice President Alexander H. Stephens.
- Bruce McGill as Secretary of War Edwin M. Stanton
- Tim Blake Nelson as Richard Schell
- Joseph Cross as Major John Hay
- Jared Harris as Lieutenant General Ulysses S. Grant
- Lee Pace as Democratic Congressman Fernando Wood
- Peter McRobbie as Democratic Congressman George H. Pendleton
- Gulliver McGrath as Tad Lincoln
- Gloria Reuben as Elizabeth Keckley
- Jeremy Strong as John George Nicolay
- Michael Stuhlbarg as Democratic Congressman George Yeaman
- Boris McGiver as Democratic Congressman Alexander Coffroth
- David Costabile as Republican Congressman James Mitchell Ashley
- Stephen Spinella as Republican Congressman Asa Vintner Litton
- Walton Goggins as Democratic Congressman Clay Hawkins
- David Warshofsky as Congressman William Hutton
- Colman Domingo as Private Harold Green
- David Oyelowo as Corporal Ira Clark
- Lukas Haas as First White Soldier
- Dane DeHaan as Second White Soldier
- Bill Camp as Mr. Jolly
- Elizabeth Marvel as Mrs. Jolly
- Byron Jennings as Conservative Republican Montgomery Blair
- Julie White as Elizabeth Blair Lee
- Grainger Hines as Secretary of the Navy Gideon Welles
- Richard Topol as Attorney General James Speed
- Walt Smith as Secretary of the Treasury William P. Fessenden
- Dakin Matthews as Secretary of the Interior John Palmer Usher
- James Ike Eichling as Postmaster General William Dennison, Jr.
- Wayne Duvall as Republican Senator Benjamin Wade
- Bill Raymond as Speaker of the House Schuyler Colfax
- Michael Stanton Kennedy as Republican Congressman Hiram Price
- Michael Shiflett as Senate President Robert M. T. Hunter
- Gregory Itzin as John Archibald Campbell.
- Stephen McKinley Henderson as William Slade
- John Hutton as Senator Charles Sumner
- Adam Driver as Samuel Beckwith
- Asa-Luke Twocrow as Lieutenant Colonel Ely S. Parker
- Christopher Evan Welch as Clerk of the House Edward McPherson
- Raynor Scheine as Republican Congressman Josiah S. "Beanpole" Burton
- S. Epatha Merkerson as Lydia Hamilton Smith
- Christopher Boyer as Robert E. Lee
- Gannon McHale as Aaron Haddam

== Production ==
=== Development ===
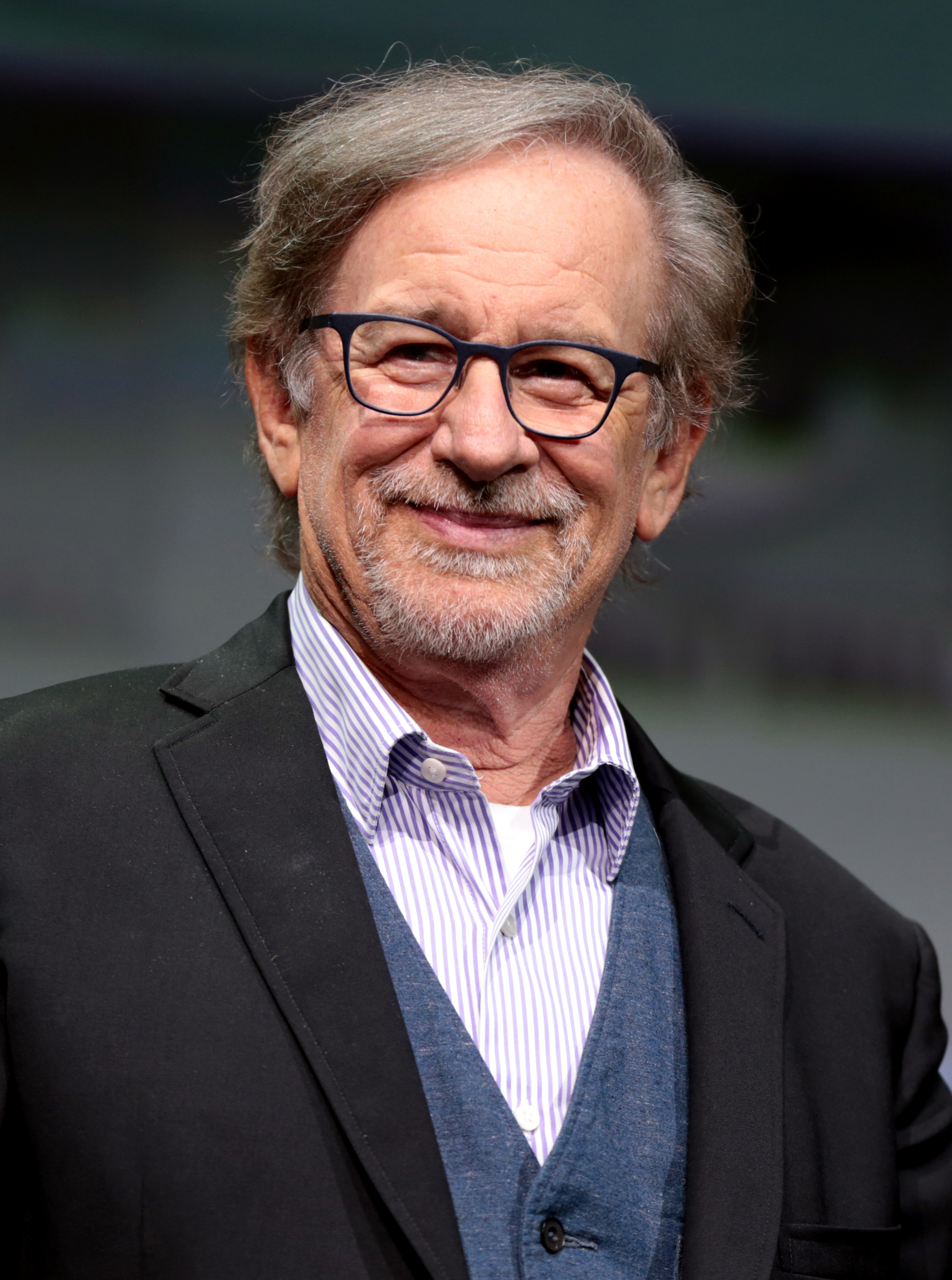
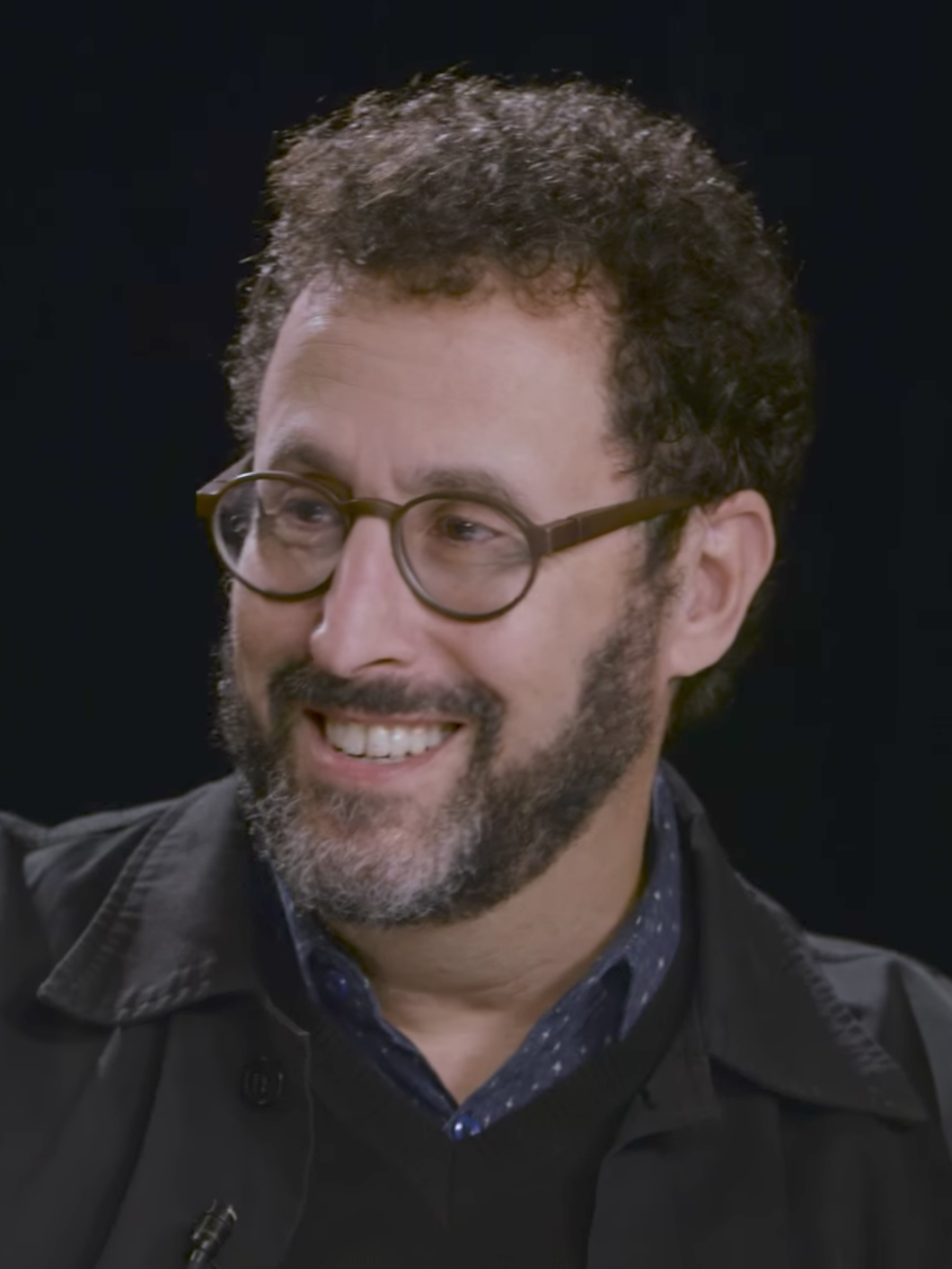
Director Steven Spielberg and screenwriter Tony Kushner

While consulting on a Steven Spielberg project in 1999, Doris Kearns Goodwin told Spielberg she was planning to write Team of Rivals, and Spielberg immediately told her he wanted the film rights. DreamWorks Pictures finalized the deal in 2001, and by the end of the year, John Logan signed on to write the script. His draft focused on Abraham Lincoln's friendship with Frederick Douglass. Playwright Paul Webb was hired to rewrite, and filming was set to begin in January 2006, but Spielberg delayed it out of dissatisfaction with the script. Liam Neeson said Webb's draft covered the entirety of Lincoln's term as president.

Tony Kushner replaced Webb. Kushner considered Lincoln "the greatest democratic leader in the world" and found the writing assignment daunting because "I have no idea [what made him great]; I don't understand what he did any more than I understand how William Shakespeare wrote Hamlet or Mozart wrote Così fan tutte." Kushner said Lincoln's abolitionist ideals made him appealing to a Jewish writer, and although he felt Lincoln was Christian, he noted the president rarely quoted the New Testament, and that his "thinking and his ethical deliberation seem very talmudic". By late 2008, Kushner joked he was on his "967,000th book about Abraham Lincoln". Kushner's initial 500-page draft focused on four months in the life of Lincoln, and by February 2009, he had rewritten it to focus on two months in Lincoln's life when he was preoccupied with adopting the Thirteenth Amendment.

Spielberg arranged a $50 million budget for the film, to placate initial distributor Paramount Pictures, who had previously delayed the project over concerns it was too similar to Spielberg's commercially unsuccessful Amistad (1997). Eventually, Paramount dropped the film in February 2009. The film's North American distribution rights then shifted to Walt Disney Studios, after DreamWorks established a new distribution deal with Disney that same month. DreamWorks remained uneasy about solely financing the project and therefore approached 20th Century Fox to co-finance half of the film. Fox agreed to join the film as a co-production partner, as well as taking international rights. Participant also agreed to finance a 25% share in the film.

=== Casting ===
Spielberg approached Daniel Day-Lewis about the project in 2003, but Day-Lewis turned down the part at the time, believing the idea of himself playing Lincoln "preposterous". Liam Neeson was cast as Lincoln in January 2005, having worked previously with Spielberg in Schindler's List. In preparation for the role, Neeson studied Lincoln extensively. However, in July 2010, Neeson left the project, saying that he had grown too old for the part. Neeson was 58 at the time, and Lincoln, during the period depicted, was 55 and 56. In an interview with GQ, Neeson said he realized during a table read that the part was not right for him in "a thunderbolt moment", and after the read, he requested that Spielberg recast his role. Co-star Sally Field, in a 2012 PBS interview, suggested that Neeson's decision was influenced by the death of his wife Natasha Richardson less than a year earlier. After dropping out of the role, Neeson incidentally suggested Day-Lewis to Spielberg. Neeson and Leonardo DiCaprio both spoke to Day-Lewis to convince him to accept the role. In November 2010, it was announced that Day-Lewis would replace Neeson in the role.

Sally Field was first approached by Spielberg and offered the role of Mary Todd Lincoln in 2005, but when Day-Lewis later replaced Neeson in the role of Lincoln, he rejected her for the role, saying "I really saw you with Liam, I don't see you with Daniel, I just don't." This was largely in reference to the age difference between Field and Day-Lewis: Lincoln was ten years older than Mary, but Field was ten years older (65) than Day-Lewis (55). Field argued that with the harsh lighting and makeup, they would both look realistically "old and worn and fat" and insisted on a screen test opposite Day-Lewis, which Spielberg reluctantly accepted with Day-Lewis' support. Their chemistry upon testing together was so well received that both Spielberg and Day-Lewis called Field the following day asking her to play Mary in the film, which she accepted.

=== Filming ===
While promoting Indiana Jones and the Kingdom of the Crystal Skull in May 2008, Spielberg announced his intention to start filming in early 2009, for release in November, wanting to honor the 200th anniversary of Lincoln's birth. In January 2009, Taunton and Dighton, Massachusetts, were being scouted as potential locations. Filming took place in Richmond, Fredericksburg, and Petersburg, Virginia. In reference to Petersburg, according to location manager Colleen Gibbons, "one thing that attracted the filmmakers to the city was the 180-degree vista of historic structures" which is "very rare".

The Virginia State Capitol served as the exteriors and interiors of the US Capitol, and the exteriors of the White House. The House of Delegates inside the building was remodeled to fit for the House of Representatives chamber set. Scenes representing Grover's Theatre were filmed in Richmond, Virginia, at Virginia Repertory Theatre's November Theatre.

== Soundtrack ==
John Williams composed and conducted the score. It was recorded by the Chicago Symphony Orchestra and the Chicago Symphony Chorus. The soundtrack album was released by Sony Classical on November 2, 2012.

All music was composed by Williams except "Battle Cry of Freedom," which was written in 1862 by American composer George Frederick Root (1820–1895) during the American Civil War. Williams composed Track 6, "With Malice Toward None", for Chris Martin, principal trumpeter of the Chicago Symphony Orchestra at the time.

== Release ==
Lincoln premiered at the New York Film Festival on October 8, 2012. It was also screened at the 2012 AFI Film Festival on November 8, 2012. Walt Disney Studios Motion Pictures distributed the film in North America through the Touchstone Pictures banner, while 20th Century Fox distributed it internationally. For its international release, 20th Century Fox added a minute-long introduction with photographs to provide historical context and reference for audiences unfamiliar with the American Civil War. For the film's release in Japan, the film was screened with a preamble introduction featuring Spielberg.

Disney Publishing Worldwide released several companion books and ancillary literature in anticipation of the film, including Lincoln: A Cinematic and Historical Companion and Lincoln: A Spielberg Film – Discover the Story. DreamWorks and Google Play released the film's trailer during a Google+ hangout with Spielberg and Joseph Gordon-Levitt on September 13, 2012. A teaser trailer was released on September 10, 2012.

Lincoln was released by Buena Vista Home Entertainment on Blu-ray, DVD, and digital download in North America on March 26, 2013. Both of the Blu-ray releases included featurettes to accompany this film titled The Journey to Lincoln and A Historic Tapestry: Richmond, Virginia, which discussed the filming of Lincoln by Spielberg in Richmond. It debuted at No. 1 in Blu-ray and DVD sales in its first week. Disney Educational Productions and Participant donated DVDs and a teaching guide, Stand Tall: Live Like Lincoln, to more than 37,100 secondary schools in the United States, after Spielberg received letters from educators who wished to incorporate the film into their curriculum.

== Reception ==
=== Box office ===
Lincoln grossed $182.2 million in North America and $93.9 overseas for a total of $275.3 million, against its $65 million budget.

The film had a limited opening in eleven theaters with $944,308 and an average of $85,846 per theater. It opened at #15, becoming the highest opening of a film with such a limited release. It opened in 1,175 theaters with $21 million and an average of $11,859 per theater. Disney produced additional prints of the film to accommodate theater demand.

=== Critical response ===
On the review aggregation website Rotten Tomatoes, the film holds an approval rating of 90% based on 287 reviews, with an average rating of 8/10. The website's critical consensus reads: "Daniel Day-Lewis characteristically delivers in this witty, dignified portrait that immerses the audience in its world and entertains even as it informs." On Metacritic, the film has weighted average score of 87 out of 100 based on 45 critics, indicating "universal acclaim". Audiences polled by CinemaScore gave the film an average grade of "A" on an A+ to F scale.

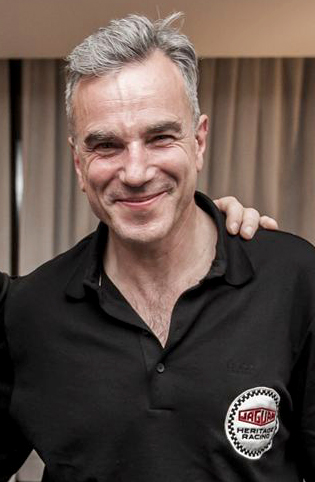
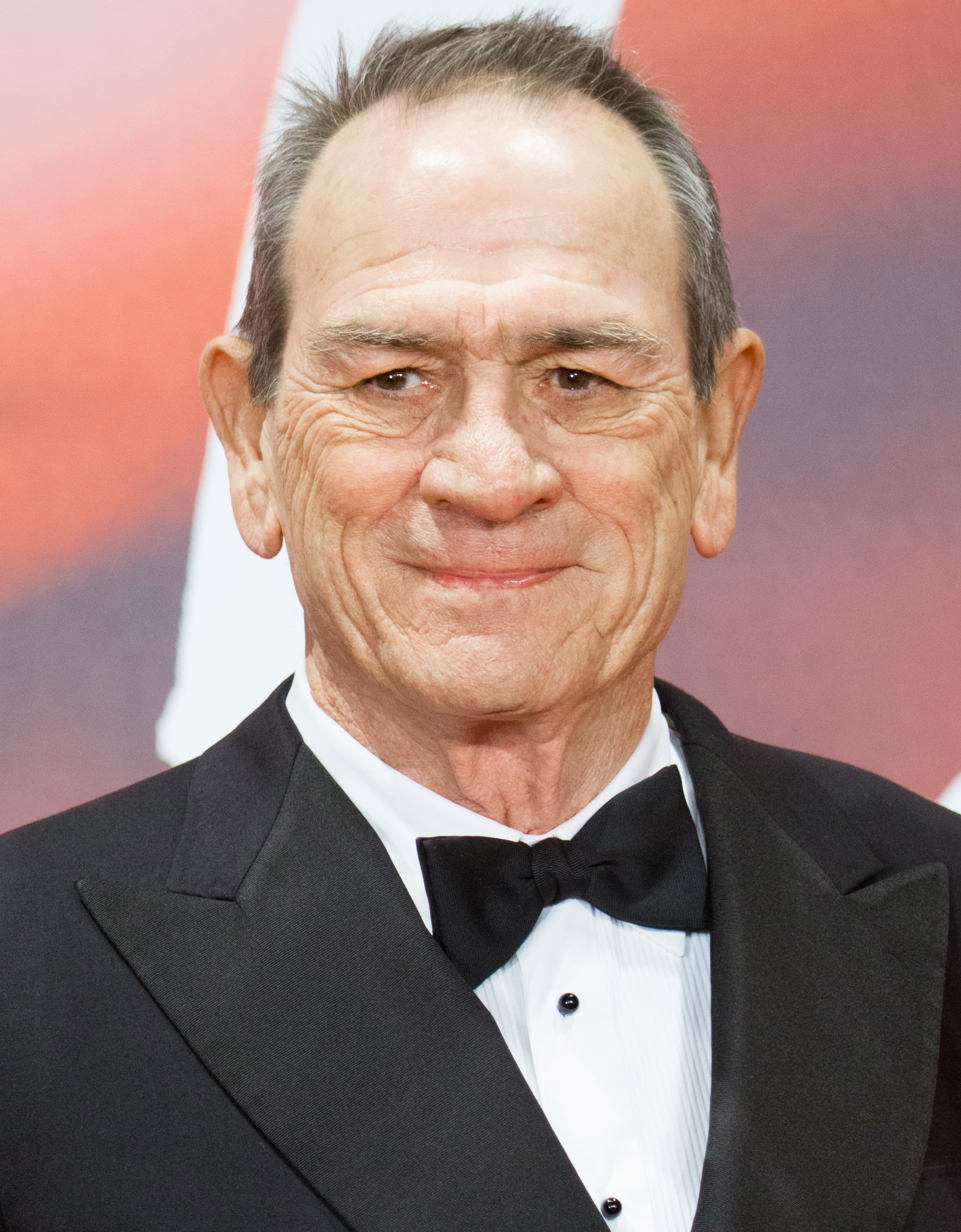
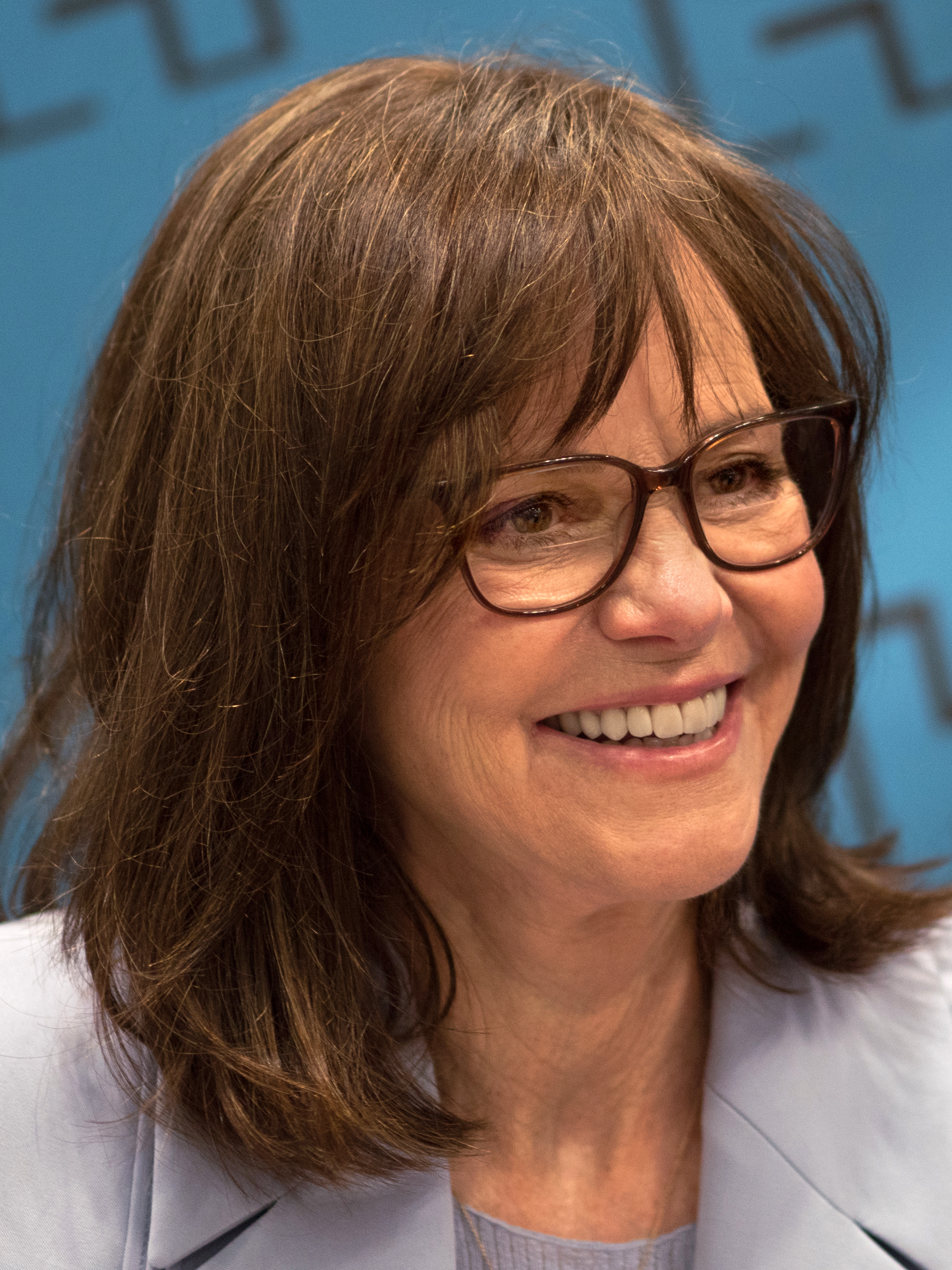
The performances of Daniel Day-Lewis, Tommy Lee Jones and Sally Field garnered widespread critical acclaim, earning them Academy Award nominations for Best Actor, Best Supporting Actor and Best Supporting Actress respectively, with Day-Lewis winning his category.

Roger Ebert of the Chicago Sun-Times gave the film four out of four stars, and said: "The hallmark of the man, performed so powerfully by Daniel Day-Lewis in Lincoln, is calm self-confidence, patience and a willingness to play politics in a realistic way." Glenn Kenny of MSN Movies gave it five out of five stars, stating: "It's the most remarkable movie Steven Spielberg has made in quite a spell, and one of the things that makes it remarkable is how it fulfills those expectations by simultaneously ignoring and transcending them."

Colin Covert of the Star Tribune wrote: "Lincoln is one of those rare projects where a great director, a great actor and a great writer amplify one another's gifts. The team of Steven Spielberg, Daniel Day-Lewis and Tony Kushner has brought forth a triumphant piece of historical journalism, a profound work of popular art and a rich examination of one of our darkest epochs." Charlie McCollum of the San Jose Mercury News called the film "one of the finest historical dramas ever committed to film." Despite mostly positive reviews, Rex Reed of The New York Observer wrote: "In all, there's too much material, too little revelation and almost nothing of Spielberg's reliable cinematic flair." However, reviewers were unanimous in their praise of Day-Lewis's performance.

A. O. Scott from The New York Times wrote that the film "is finally a movie about how difficult and costly it has been for the United States to recognize the full and equal humanity of black people" and concluded that the movie was "a rough and noble democratic masterpiece". He also said that Lincoln's concern about his wife's emotional instability and "the strains of a wartime presidency ... produce a portrait that is intimate but also decorous, drawn with extraordinary sensitivity and insight and focused, above all, on Lincoln's character as a politician. This is, in other words, less a biopic than a political thriller, a civics lesson that is energetically staged and alive with moral energy." Peter Bradshaw of The Guardian gave the film a full five stars, writing that the film was "moving and honourably high-minded... I can't imagine anyone not wanting to see it."

As reported in the Maariv newspaper, on February 3, 2013, Israeli Prime Minister Netanyahu and his ministers discussed Spielberg's film, which several of them saw in Israeli cinemas. They debated whether, with the aim of abolishing slavery, the ends justified the means used by Lincoln, and compared Lincoln's predicament with their own complicated situation in the aftermath of the 2013 Israeli elections.

In July 2025, it was one of the films voted for the "Readers' Choice" edition of The New York Times' list of "The 100 Best Movies of the 21st Century," finishing at number 222. That same month, it ranked number 85 on Rolling Stone's list of "The 100 Best Movies of the 21st Century."

=== Historian response ===
Eric Foner (Columbia University), a Pulitzer Prize-winning historian of the period, claimed in a letter to The New York Times that "The film grossly exaggerates the possibility that by January 1865 the war might have ended with slavery still intact." He also noted, "The 13th Amendment originated not with Lincoln but with a petition campaign early in 1864 organized by the Women's National Loyal League, an organization of abolitionist women headed by Susan B. Anthony and Elizabeth Cady Stanton." Kate Masur (Northwestern University) accused the film of oversimplifying the role of blacks in abolition and dismissed the effort as "an opportunity squandered" in an op-ed for The New York Times. Harold Holzer, the co-chair of the Abraham Lincoln Bicentennial Foundation and author of more than 40 books, served as a consultant to the film and praised it, but also observed that there is "no shortage of small historical bloopers in the movie" in a piece for The Daily Beast. Holzer states, "As for the Spielberg movie's opening scene ... it is almost inconceivable that any uniformed soldier of the day (or civilians, for that matter) would have memorized a speech that, however ingrained in modern memory, did not achieve any semblance of a national reputation until the 20th century."

Barry Bradford, a member of the Organization of American Historians, offered an analysis of some of the finer historical points of the film's representation of clothing, relationships and appearance. Allen Guelzo (Gettysburg College), also writing for The Daily Beast, had some plot criticism, but disagreed with Holzer: "The pains that have been taken in the name of historical authenticity in this movie are worth hailing just on their own terms". In a later interview with the World Socialist Web Site, Guelzo claimed that "the film was 90 percent on the mark, which given the way Hollywood usually does history is saying something" and that it "got with reasonable accuracy a lot of Lincoln's character, the characters of the main protagonists, and the overall debate over the 13th Amendment. The acting and screenwriting were especially well done... I had never thought that Daniel Day-Lewis was acting, because what he portrayed seemed so close to my own mental image of what Lincoln must have been like." A historian has suggested that the depiction of Lincoln's high pitched voice, somewhat awkward mannerisms and even how he walked was remarkably accurate.

David Stewart, an independent historical author, writing for History News Network, described Spielberg's work as "reasonably solid history", and told readers of HNN to "go see it with a clear conscience". Lincoln biographer Ronald White also admired the film, though he noted a few mistakes and pointed out in an interview with NPR, "Is every word true? No."

Historian Joshua M. Zeitz, writing in The Atlantic, noted some minor mistakes, but concluded that "Lincoln is not a perfect film, but it is an important film". Following a screening during the film's opening weekend, the Minnesota Civil War Commemoration Task Force held a panel discussion in which Dr. David Woodard of Concordia University remarked: "I always look at these films to see if a regular person who wasn't a 'Lincoln nut' would want to read a book about it after they watched the movie. I get the impression that most people who are not history buffs will now want to read something about Lincoln."

Regarding the historical source material for Kushner's screenplay, legal historian Michael Vorenberg, a professor at Brown University and author of Final Freedom: The Civil War, The Abolition of Slavery, and the Thirteenth Amendment, noted several details throughout the film that "could only have come from [his] book." Among these details were specifics of dealings between Democrats and Thaddeus Stevens, the story behind securing Alexander Coffroth's vote and the fact that African Americans were present in the congressional galleries during the final vote. Ultimately, Kushner replied directly to inquiries from The New Republic writer Timothy Noah, explaining that while he had read Vorenberg's book and many others as research, he insists that Team of Rivals was his principal source material.

Regarding the portrayal of Lincoln's final moments, editor Rhoda Sneller of Abraham Lincoln Online, references a diary entry from Secretary of the Navy Gideon Welles. The entry conflicts with the final scenes in the film in which the dying Lincoln is seen dressed in a nightgown, hunched over in his bed. Welles wrote "The giant sufferer lay extended diagonally across the bed," and "he had been stripped of his clothes." The differences between the first hand account and the present Lincoln serve to paint a more concise and dignified image of the president's death.

== Accolades ==
=== Top ten lists ===
Lincoln was listed on many critics' top ten lists.

- 1st – David Denby, The New Yorker (tied with Zero Dark Thirty)
- 1st – Owen Gleiberman, Entertainment Weekly
- 1st – Stephen Holden, The New York Times
- 1st – Mick LaSalle, San Francisco Chronicle
- 2nd – Lisa Schwarzbaum, Entertainment Weekly
- 2nd – David Edelstein, New York
- 2nd – Betsy Sharkey, Los Angeles Times (tied with Django Unchained)
- 2nd – Christopher Orr, The Atlantic
- 2nd – Michael Phillips, Chicago Tribune
- 2nd – Ann Hornaday, The Washington Post
- 2nd – Huffington Post
- 2nd – A. O. Scott, The New York Times
- 3rd – Roger Ebert, Chicago Sun-Times
- 3rd – Mike Scott, The Times-Picayune
- 3rd – James Berardinelli, ReelViews
- 3rd – Mary Pols, Time
- 3rd – Dana Stevens, Slate
- 4th – Peter Travers, Rolling Stone
- 4th – Rene Rodriguez, Miami Herald
- 4th – Bill Goodykoontz, Arizona Republic
- 4th – Joshua Rothkopf, Time Out New York
- 4th – Alison Willmore, The A.V. Club
- 4th – Steven Rea, Philadelphia Inquirer
- 5th – Anne Thompson, IndieWire
- 5th – Joe Neumaier, New York Daily News
- 6th – Ty Burr, Boston Globe
- 6th – David Fear, Time Out New York
- 6th – Kristopher Tapley, HitFix
- 6th – Jake Coyle, Associated Press
- 6th – Andrew O'Hehir, Salon.com
- 7th – Glenn Kenny, MSN Movies
- 8th – David Germain, Associated Press
- 8th – Lisa Kennedy, The Denver Post
- 10th – Melissa Anderson, Village Voice
- 10th – Richard Roeper, Chicago Sun-Times
- Top 10 (listed alphabetically) – Bob Mondello, NPR
- Top 10 (ranked alphabetically) – Claudia Puig, USA Today
- Top 10 (listed alphabetically) – Joe Morgenstern, The Wall Street Journal
- Best of 2012 (listed alphabetically, not ranked) – Kenneth Turan, Los Angeles Times

== See also ==
- Cultural depictions of Abraham Lincoln
- List of 2012 films based on actual events
- List of films featuring slavery

== Bibliography ==
- Mitchell, Mary Niall. "Seeing Lincoln: Spielberg's Film and the Visual Culture of the Nineteenth Century", Rethinking History 19 (Sept. 2015), 493–505.
- Dimock, Wai Chee (Winter 2013). "Crowdsourcing History: Ishmael Reed, Tony Kushner, and Steven Spielberg Update the Civil War". American Literary History. 25 (4): 896–914. doi:10.1093/alh/ajt044. S2CID 144293300.
