= Not Fade Away (film) =

2012 film by David Chase

- Theatrical release poster
- Directed by: David Chase
- Written by: David Chase
- Produced by: Mark Johnson; David Chase
- Starring: James Gandolfini; John Magaro; Jack Huston; Bella Heathcote
- Cinematography: Eigil Bryld
- Edited by: Sidney Wolinsky
- Production companies: Paramount Vantage; Indian Paintbrush; The Weinstein Company; Gran Via Productions; Chase Films
- Distributed by: Paramount Pictures
- Release dates: October 6, 2012 (NYFF); December 21, 2012 (United States)
- Running time: 112 minutes
- Country: United States
- Language: English
- Budget: $20 million
- Box office: $610,792

Not Fade Away is a 2012 American coming-of-age drama film written, directed and co-produced by David Chase. The subject of the film is a young man's struggles with a difficult family life and his efforts to launch a music career during the Vietnam War.

== Plot ==
In 1960s suburban New Jersey, a group of friends form a rock band and try to make it big.

In his late teens, Doug Damiano lives with his father, Pat, who has psoriasis and is physically rough with Doug; his mother, Antoinette, who frequently grows hysterical and threatens suicide; and his sister, Evelyn. Doug sees his friend Gene Gaunt singing and playing lead guitar for a band in high school, and resolves to join the band to earn the affections of Grace Dietz. He gets his chance when the band's drummer, Schindewulf, is drafted to go to Vietnam.

In the wake of the "British Invasion", Gene is trying to remodel his band after the Beatles and the Rolling Stones, and he believes Doug is suited to this style. After an awkward bass player loses his position, the core of the band is Doug, Gene, and their friend Wells. Wells plays rhythm guitar, and Doug plays drums and sings backup vocals.

At a party Gene accidentally swallows a joint while trying to smoke it and is unable to sing. Doug takes over on lead vocals, and the band members later agree that he is superior to Gene. Gene feels threatened by Doug and tries to keep the spotlight on himself. Doug tells his father that he intends to join the army and get an ROTC scholarship, but abandons these plans after the Vietnam War begins. He drops out of college to pursue his musical career full-time, causing a rift between himself and Pat.

Eventually Doug gets involved with Grace, but their relationship suffers when Wells reveals that Grace used to fellate him and others regularly. Doug and Grace have an argument in which she wrongly accuses him of sleeping with her sister, Joy. During a concert, Gene juggles firecrackers in protest of the war, but fumbles and burns his scalp, humiliating himself and the band. Doug goes to Gene's house to formally kick him out of the band, and Gene beats him up until his father intervenes.

After Joy's parents commit her to a mental hospital, Doug and the grief-stricken Grace get back together. As Pat learns that his psoriasis is actually mycosis fungoides cancer, he begins to mellow, taking Doug out to dinner and revealing family secrets.

By 1967, Doug and Wells get the opportunity to audition for Jerry Ragovoy. They recruit Gene back into the band for the audition, although Gene tells them he wants a "featured" credit on their performance of an original song, "The St. Valentine's Day Massacre". Ragovoy sees potential in the band, but outlines a rigorous performance schedule before he's ready to sign them to a contract. He says that great music is "ten percent inspiration and ninety percent perspiration," a sentiment Pat earlier expressed to Doug. The band is unenthusiastic about following Jerry's instructions.

After Wells is injured in a motorcycle accident, the potential record deal is postponed for another year. Losing interest in the rock and roll lifestyle, Doug decides to go to film school in California. At a party in Hollywood, he sees Charlie Watts leaving the house and hears a rumor that Mick Jagger is in the bathroom with several women, although nobody actually sees Jagger.

Doug tries to hitchhike home and is invited into a car by a strange-looking woman who says he looks lonesome. He refuses the ride. Looking around downtown Los Angeles, he sees illuminated clouds that had inspired him before. Smiling, he walks down the street.

Evelyn walks down the same street, and muses aloud that she is writing an essay about America's two biggest innovations: nuclear weapons and rock 'n roll. She asks which one will win in the end, then dances to the Sex Pistols' cover of "Roadrunner" in the street.

== Cast ==
- John Magaro as Douglas Damiano
- Jack Huston as Eugene Gaunt
- Will Brill as Wells
- Bella Heathcote as Grace Dietz
- Brad Garrett as Jerry Ragovoy
- Christopher McDonald as Jack Dietz
- James Gandolfini as Pat Damiano
- Isiah Whitlock Jr. as Landers
- Dominique McElligott as Joy Dietz
- Molly Price as Antoinette Damiano
- Meg Guzulescu as Evelyn Damiano
- Gerard Canonico as Schindewulf

Other minor appearances include comedian Lisa Lampanelli as Aunt Josie; Louis Mustillo as Uncle Johnny Vitelloni; Robert Funaro as Uncle Murf; Justine Lupe as Candace; Lucie Pohl as Severine; Alfie Stewart as Keith; Dominic Sherwood as Mick; Julia Garner as the strange-looking girl in the car; Jay Weinberg as a jazz drummer; Charlie Plummer as Grace's little brother; Bob Bandiera as a jingle guitarist; Levi Wilson as Charlie Watts.

== Reception ==
On the review aggregator website Rotten Tomatoes, 69% of 88 critics' reviews are positive. The website's consensus reads: "Not Fade Away is a coming-of-age story set to a British Invasion beat that occasionally meanders but mostly charms." Metacritic, which uses a weighted average, assigned the film a score of 65 out of 100, based on 27 critics, indicating "generally favorable" reviews.

Keith Uhlich of Time Out New York named Not Fade Away the second-best film of 2012, citing it as proof that Chase's work on The Sopranos was "no fluke". In 2020, Uhlich named it the eighth-best film of the 2010s.

== Re-release ==
In December 2024, Chase and the American Cinematheque presented a black-and-white version of the film at a special screening at the Aero Theatre in Santa Monica, California. Chase screened this version again at the Museum of the Moving Image in Queens, New York City in April 2025.

== Soundtrack ==
No.	Title	Writer(s)	Length
1.	"There Was a Time"	James Brown	3:36
2.	"Tell Me"	Mick Jagger / Keith Richards	3:49
3.	"Ride On Baby"	Mick Jagger / Keith Richards	2:52
4.	"Bo Diddley"	Bo Diddley	2:46
5.	"Bo Diddley"	Bo Diddley	2:48
6.	"Subterranean Homesick Blues"	Bob Dylan
7.	"Parachute Woman"	Mick Jagger / Keith Richards	2:20
8.	"Go Now"	Larry Banks / Milton Bennett	3:13
9.	"Time Is On My Side"	Jerry Ragovoy	3:24
10.	"Dust My Broom"	Elmore James	2:57
11.	"I Ain't Gonna Eat Out My Heart"	Pam Sawyer / Laurie Burton	2:43
12.	"Good Morning Blues"	Lead Belly	2:56
13.	"Train Kept A Rollin'"	Tiny Bradshaw / Lois Mann a.k.a. Syd Nathan	2:16
14.	"Train Kept A Rollin'"	Tiny Bradshaw / Lois Mann a.k.a. Syd Nathan	2:15
15.	"Pretty Ballerina"	Michael Brown	2:38
16.	"Down So Low"	Tracy Nelson	3:52
17.	"Itchycoo Park"	Steve Marriott / Ronnie Lane	2:49
18.	"Me and the Devil Blues"	Robert Johnson	2:33
19.	"The St. Valentine's Day Massacre"	Steven Van Zandt	3:49
20.	"T.B. Sheets"	Van Morrison	9:47
21.	"Some Velvet Morning"	Lee Hazlewood	3:43
22.	"Bali Ha'i"	Richard Rodgers / Oscar Hammerstein II	3:41
23.	"Roadrunner"	Jonathan Richman	3:43
24.	"Pipeline"	Brian Carman / Bob Spickard	2:37
25.	"She Belongs to Me"	Bob Dylan	2:49
26.	"Surgical Supply Jingle"	Margaret Dorn	0:40
