= IMVBox =

It is a digital service platform to purchase Iranian films with English subtitles

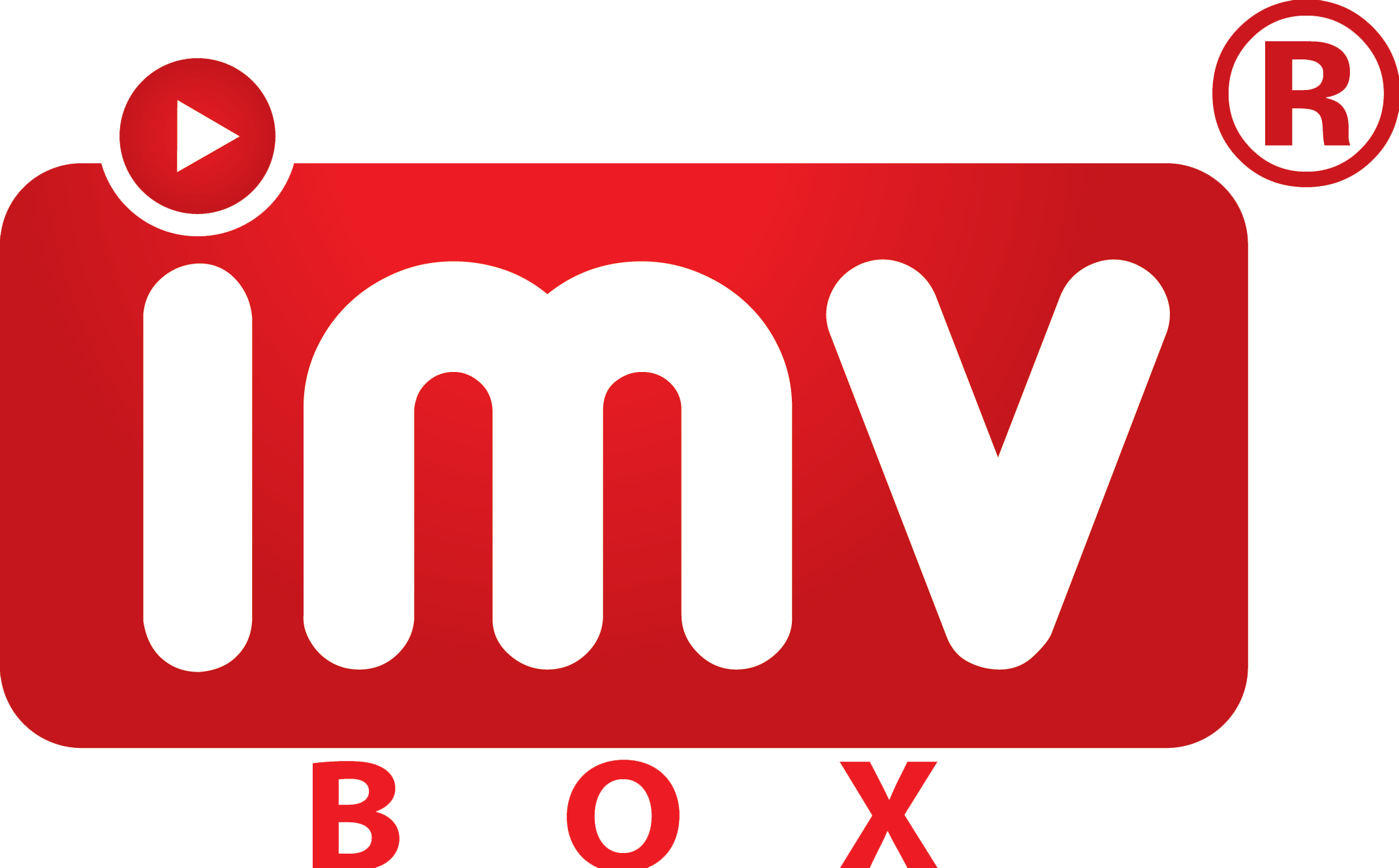
- Website type: Streaming video
- Founded: 2013
- Headquarters: London, California and Tehran
- Industry: Entertainment
- Products: Streaming media; Video on demand
- Website: www.imvbox.com
- Registration: Free & Subscription
- Current status: Active

IMVBox is an online distribution platform established in September 2013 to support cinema of Iran. It was initially set up by an office in the UK but it has since opened offices in Tehran and the US. It offers legal English-subtitled Iranian movies. Its YouTube channel was launched in May 2014, providing content to Persian speakers, free of charge. The company aims to fight online piracy and copyright infringement. A campaign was rolled out on Facebook in July 2014 to promote IMVBox's work.

IMVBox's profile was heightened over the summer of 2014, when it won appraisal from the Iranian film industry. In early May the Iranian Students News Agency carried a piece that described IMVBox's work in combating online piracy. On 20 July Iranian filmmakers including Mojtaba Mirtahmasb and Rakhshan Bani-Etemad released a statement in which they called on viewers of Iranian films to avoid engaging in online piracy. In the statement Mirtahmasb and Bani-Etemad encouraged their viewers and supporters to go to IMVBox, seeing it as a fair and legal option. Among the 200 signatories to the statement were filmmaker Jafar Panahi, actress Leila Hatami, and actor Ali Mosaffa.
