= 2012 New York Film Festival =

50th edition

- Opening film: Life of Pi
- Closing film: Flight
- Location: New York City, United States
- Founded: 1963
- Founded by: Richard Roud and Amos Vogel
- Hosted by: Film at Lincoln Center
- Artistic director: Richard Peña
- Festival date: September 28 – October 14, 2012
- Website: https://www.filmlinc.org/nyff/

New York Film Festival
- 2013 2011

The 50th New York Film Festival took place from September 28 to October 14, 2012, in New York City, presented by Film at Lincoln Center.

The festival's opening film was Ang Lee's Life of Pi, David Chase's Not Fade Away was the festival's centerpiece, while Robert Zemeckis' Flight was the festival's closing film.

It was the last edition led by Richard Peña, who was the festival's Artistic director since 1988. He was replaced by Kent Jones.

Appearing in NYFF's "Main Slate" for the first time were: Antonio Méndez Esparza, David Chase, Dror Moreh, Javier Rebollo, Joachim Lafosse, João Rui Guerra da Mata, Jun Lana, Lucien Castaing-Taylor and Véréna Paravel, Marc-Henri Wajnberg, Miguel Gomes, Rama Burshtein, Valeria Sarmiento, and Yeşim Ustaoğlu.

World premieres included: Ang Lee's Life of Pi, Oliver Stone's The Untold History of the United States, and Steven Spielberg's Lincoln.

== Official Selections ==
=== Main Slate ===
The following films were selected:

English Title	Original Title	Director(s)	Production Country
Amour		Michael Haneke	France, Austria, Germany
Araf/Somewhere in Between	Araf	Yeşim Ustaoğlu	Belgium, France, Germany, Netherlands, South Korea, Turkey
Barbara		Christian Petzold	Germany
Beyond the Hills	După dealuri	Cristian Mungiu	Romania, France
Bwakaw		Jun Lana	Philippines
Camille Rewinds	Camille redouble	Noémie Lvovsky	France
Caesar Must Die	Cesare deve morire	Paolo and Vittorio Taviani	Italy
The Dead Man and Being Happy	El muerto y ser feliz	Javier Rebollo	Spain, France, Argentina
Fill the Void	למלא את החלל	Rama Burshtein	Israel
First Cousin Once Removed		Alan Berliner	United States
Flight (closing film)		Robert Zemeckis	United States
Frances Ha		Noah Baumbach	United States
The Gatekeepers	שומרי הסף	Dror Moreh	Israel, France, Belgium, Germany
Ginger & Rosa		Sally Potter	United Kingdom, Denmark, Canada
Here and There	Aquí y allá	Antonio Méndez Esparza	United States, Spain, Mexico
Holy Motors		Leos Carax	France, Germany
Hyde Park on Hudson		Roger Michell	United Kingdom, United States
Kinshasa Kids		Marc-Henri Wajnberg	Belgium
The Last Time I Saw Macao	A Última Vez Que Vi Macau	João Pedro Rodrigues and João Rui Guerra da Mata	Portugal, Macau, France
Leviathan		Lucien Castaing-Taylor and Véréna Paravel	United States
Life of Pi (opening film)		Ang Lee	United States, United Kingdom, Taiwan
Like Someone in Love	ライク・サムワン・イン・ラブ	Abbas Kiarostami	Japan, France
Lines of Wellington	Linhas de Wellington	Valeria Sarmiento	Portugal, France
Memories Look at Me	记忆望着我	Fang Song	China
Night Across the Street	La noche de enfrente	Raúl Ruiz	Chile
No		Pablo Larraín	Chile, France, United States
Not Fade Away (centerpiece)		David Chase	United States
Our Children	À perdre la raison	Joachim Lafosse	Belgium, France
The Paperboy		Lee Daniels	United States
Passion		Brian De Palma	France, Germany, United Kingdom
Something in the Air	Après mai	Olivier Assayas	France
Tabu		Miguel Gomes	Portugal, Germany, Brazil, France
You Ain't Seen Nothin' Yet	Vous n'avez encore rien vu	Alain Resnais	France

=== Special Screenings ===
The following films were selected:

Title	Director(s)	Production Country
Lincoln	Steven Spielberg	United States
The Met Live in HD: L'Elisir d'Amore	Bartlett Sher	United States
Once Every Day	Richard Foreman	United States
The Princess Bride (1987)	Rob Reiner	United States
The Untold History of the United States	Oliver Stone	United States

=== Midnight Movies ===
The following films were selected:

English Title	Original Title	Director(s)	Production Country
The Bay		Barry Levinson	United States, Canada
Berberian Sound Studio		Peter Strickland	United Kingdom
Beyond Outrage	アウトレイジ ビヨンド	Takeshi Kitano	Japan

=== Masterworks ===
The following films were selected:

English Title	Original Title	Director(s)	Production Country
Cousin Jules (1973)	Le Cousin Jules	Dominique Benicheti	France
Downpour (1972)	رگبار	Bahram Beyzai	Iran
Fellini Satyricon (1969)		Federico Fellini	Italy
Field Diary (1982)	יומן שדה	Amos Gitai	Israel, France
Heaven's Gate (1980)		Michael Cimino	United States
The King of Marvin Gardens (1972)		Bob Rafelson	United States
Lawrence of Arabia (1962)		David Lean	United Kingdom, United States
Little Shop of Horrors (1986)		Frank Oz	United States
Marnie (1964)		Alfred Hitchcock	United States
The Mattei Affair (1972)	Il Caso Mattei	Francesco Rosi	Italy
Native Son (1951)	Sangre negra	Pierre Chenal	Argentina
Nothing but a Man (1964)		Michael Roemer	United States
Old Czech Legends (1953)	Staré pověsti české	Jiří Trnka	Czechoslovakia
The Overcoat (1926)	Шинель	Grigori Kozintsev and Leonid Trauberg	Soviet Union
Richard III (1955)		Laurence Olivier	United Kingdom
The Rolling Stones: Charlie Is My Darling - Ireland '65 (1966-2012)		Peter Whitehead and Michael Gochanour	United Kingdom, United States
The Satin Slipper (1985)	Le Soulier de satin	Manoel de Oliveira	Portugal
Snow White and the Seven Dwarfs (1937)		David Hand	United States

=== Men of Cinema ===
The following films were selected:

English Title	Original Title	Director(s)	Production Country
Liebelei (1933)		Max Ophüls	Germany
Night and the City (1950)		Jules Dassin	United Kingdom
Objective, Burma! (1945)		Raoul Walsh	United States
The Prowler (1951)		Joseph Losey	United States
Pursued (1947)		Raoul Walsh	United States
The Tiger of Eschnapur (1959)	Der Tiger von Eschnapur	Fritz Lang	West Germany, France, Italy
Whirlpool (1950)		Otto Preminger	United States
