= 2011 New York Film Festival =

49th edition

- Opening film: Carnage
- Closing film: The Descendants
- Location: New York City, United States
- Founded: 1963
- Founded by: Richard Roud and Amos Vogel
- Hosted by: Film at Lincoln Center
- Artistic director: Richard Peña
- Festival date: September 30 – October 16, 2011
- Website: https://www.filmlinc.org/nyff/

New York Film Festival
- 2012 2010

The 49th New York Film Festival took place from September 30 to October 16, 2011, in New York City, presented by Film at Lincoln Center.

The festival's opening film was Roman Polanski's Carnage, Simon Curtis' My Week with Marilyn was the festival's centerpiece, while Alexander Payne's The Descendants was the festival's closing film.

Appearing in NYFF's "Main Slate" for the first time were: Alice Rohrwacher, Gerardo Naranjo, Joseph Cedar, Julia Loktev, Mia Hansen-Løve, Michel Hazanavicius, Mojtaba Mirtahmasb, Nadav Lapid, Santiago Mitre, Sean Durkin, Simon Curtis, and Ulrich Köhler.

World premieres included: Martin Scorsese's George Harrison: Living in the Material World and Hugo, Simon Curtis' My Week with Marilyn.

== Official Selections ==
=== Main Slate ===
David Cronenberg's A Dangerous Method and Pedro Almodóvar's The Skin I Live In received "Special Gala" screenings. The following films were selected:

English Title	Original Title	Director(s)	Production Country
4:44 Last Day on Earth		Abel Ferrara	United States, France, Switzerland, Chile
The Artist		Michel Hazanavicius	France, Belgium
Carnage (opening film)		Roman Polanski	France, Germany, Poland, Spain
A Dangerous Method (special gala)		David Cronenberg	Canada, Germany, United Kingdom
The Descendants (closing film)		Alexander Payne	United States
Footnote	הערת שוליים	Joseph Cedar	Israel
George Harrison: Living in the Material World		Martin Scorsese	United States
Goodbye First Love	Un amour de jeunesse	Mia Hansen-Løve	France, Germany
Le Havre		Aki Kaurismäki	Finland, France, Germany
Heavenly Body	Corpo celeste	Alice Rohrwacher	Italy
The Loneliest Planet		Julia Loktev	United States, Georgia, Germany
The Kid with a Bike	Le gamin au vélo	Jean-Pierre and Luc Dardenne	Belgium, France
Martha Marcy May Marlene		Sean Durkin	United States
Melancholia		Lars von Trier	Denmark, Sweden, France, Germany
Miss Bala		Gerardo Naranjo	Mexico
My Week with Marilyn (centerpiece)		Simon Curtis	United Kingdom, United States
Once Upon a Time in Anatolia	Bir Zamanlar Anadolu'da	Nuri Bilge Ceylan	Turkey, Bosnia and Herzegovina
Pina		Wim Wenders	Germany
Play		Ruben Östlund	Sweden
Policeman	השוטר	Nadav Lapid	Israel
A Separation	جدایی نادر از سیمین	Asghar Farhadi	Iran
Shame		Steve McQueen	United Kingdom
The Skin I Live In (special gala)	La piel que habito	Pedro Almodóvar	Spain
Sleeping Sickness	Schlafkrankheit	Ulrich Köhler	Germany
The Student	El estudiante	Santiago Mitre	Argentina
This Is Not a Film	این فیلم	Jafar Panahi and Mojtaba Mirtahmasb	Iran
The Turin Horse	A torinói ló	Béla Tarr and Ágnes Hranitzky	Hungary

=== Special Screenings ===
James Toback's Fingers (1978) was selected for the "Pauline Kael: A Life in the Dark, A Panel Discussion". The following films were selected:

English Title	Original Title	Director(s)	Production Country
The 99: Unbound		Dave Osbourne	United Kingdom
The Adventures of Buckaroo Banzai Across the 8th Dimension		W. D. Richter	United States
Andrew Bird: Fever Year		Xan Aranda	United States
The Ballad of Mott The Hoople		Chris Hall and Mike Kerry	United Kingdom
Castle in the Sky (1986)	天空の城ラピュタ	Hayao Miyazaki	Japan
Corman's World: Exploits of a Hollywood Rebel		Alex Stapleton	United States
The Intruder (1962)		Roger Corman	United States
Clash of the Wolves (1925)		Noel M. Smith	United States
Crazy Horse		Frederick Wiseman	United States, France
Don't Expect Too Much		Susan Ray	United States
Dreibelein: Beats Being Dead	Dreileben - Komm mir nicht nach	Christian Petzold	Germany
Dreibelein: Don't Follow Me Around	Dreileben - Komm mir nicht nach	Dominik Graf	Germany
Dreibelein: One Minute of Darkness	Dreileben - Eine Minute Dunkel	Christoph Hochhäusler	Germany
The Exterminating Angel (1962)	El ángel exterminador	Luis Buñuel	Mexico
Fingers (1978) (Pauline Kael: A Life in the Dark, A Panel Discussion)		James Toback	United States
From Morn to Midnight (1920)	Von morgens bis mitternachts	Karlheinz Martin	Germany (Weimar Republic)
Howards End (1992)		James Ivory	United Kingdom, Japan, United States
Hugo		Martin Scorsese	United States
The Music According to Antonio Carlos Jobim	A Música Segundo Tom Jobim	Nelson Pereira dos Santos	Brazil
Paradise Lost 3: Purgatory		Joe Berlinger and Bruce Sinofsky	United States
Patience (After Sebald)		Grant Gree	United Kingdom
The Royal Tenenbaums (2001)		Wes Anderson	United States
Salvador (1986)		Oliver Stone	United Kingdom, Mexico, United States
Sodankylä Forever	Sodankylä ikuisesti: Elokuvan vuosisata	Peter von Bagh	Finland
Spirited Away (2001)	千と千尋の神隠し	Hayao Miyazaki	Japan
Tahir	Tahrir, place de la Libération	Stefano Savona	France, Italy
Vito		Jeffrey Schwarz	United States

=== Masterworks ===
The following films were selected:

English Title	Original Title	Director(s)	Production Country
Ben-Hur (1959)		William Wyler	United States
The Gold Rush (1925)		Charlie Chaplin	United States
Invasion (1969)	Invasión	Hugo Santiago	Argentina

=== Short Programs ===
The following films were selected:

English Title	Original Title	Director(s)	Production Country
Aaron Burr, Part 2		Dana O'Keefe	United States
Blue		Stephen Kang	New Zealand
The Bird Spider	La migala	Jaime Dezcallar	Spain
Frist Match		Olivia Newman	United States
Graffitiger		Libor Pixa	Czech Republic
Grandmothers	Abuelas	Afarin Eghbal	United Kingdom
The Great Gatsby in Five Minutes		Michael Almereyda	United States
Memory by Design		Nathan Punwar	United States
My Bow Breathing	Il respiro dell'arco	Enrico Maria Artale	Italy
The Runner		Ana Lazarevic	Serbia, United States
The Strange Thing About the Johnsons		Ari Aster	United States
Traitors		Sean Gullette	United States

=== Retrospective: Velvet Bullets and Steel Kisses ===
This year section celebrated the Nikkatsu centennial anniversary, the following films were selected:

English Title	Original Title	Director(s)	Production Country
The Burmese Harp (1956)	ビルマの竪琴	Kon Ichikawa	Japan
Capricious Young Man (1935)	戦国奇譚 気まぐれ冠者	Mansaku Itami	Japan
Charisma (1999)	カリスマ	Kiyoshi Kurosawa	Japan
Cold Fish (2010)	冷たい熱帯魚	Sion Sono	Japan
A Colt Is My Passport (1967)	は俺のパスポート	Takashi Nomura	Japan
Crazed Fruit (1956)	狂った果実	Kō Nakahira	Japan
A Diary of Chuji's Travels (1927)	忠次旅日記	Daisuke Itō	Japan
Gate of Flesh (1964)	肉體の門	Seijun Suzuki	Japan
The Hell-Fated Courtesan / Confidential: The Hell of Tortured Prostitutes (1973)	(秘)女郎責め地獄	Noboru Tanaka	Japan
Hometown (1930)	藤原義江のふるさと	Kenji Mizoguchi	Japan
I Look Up When I Walk (1962)	上を向いて歩こう	Toshio Masuda	Japan
Intimidation (1960)	ある脅迫	Koreyoshi Kurahara	Japan
Izu no Odoriko (1974)	伊豆の踊子	Katsumi Nishikawa	Japan
Love Hotel (1985)	ラブホテル	Shinji Sōmai	Japan
Made to Order Cloth / Oatsurae Jirokichi Koshi (1931)	御誂治郎吉格子	Daisuke Itō	Japan
The Million Ryo Pot (1935)	丹下左膳余話 百萬両の壺	Sadao Yamanaka	Japan
Mud and Soldiers (1939)	土と兵隊	Tomotaka Tasaka	Japan
The Oldest Profession / Confidential Report: Sex Market	(秘)色情めす市場	Noboru Tanaka	Japan
Pigs and Battleships (1961)	豚と軍艦	Shōhei Imamura	Japan
Retaliation (1968)	縄張はもらった	Yasuharu Hasebe	Japan
Rusty Knife (1958)	錆びたナイフ	Toshio Masuda	Japan
Season of the Sun (1956)	太陽の季節	Takumi Furukawa	Japan
Singing Lovebirds (1939)	鴛鴦歌合戦	Masahiro Makino	Japan
Stray Cat Rock (1970-1971)	野良猫ロック	Yasuharu Hasebe	Japan
Sun in the Last Days of the Shogunate / Shinagawa Path (1957)	幕末太陽傳 or 幕末太陽伝	Yuzo Kawashima	Japan
Suzaki Paradise: Red Light (1956)	洲崎パラダイス 赤信号	Yuzo Kawashima	Japan
Take Aim at the Police Van (1960)	十三号待避線より: その護送車を狙え	Seijun Suzuki	Japan
Tattooed Flower Vase (1976)	花芯の刺青 熟れた壺	Masaru Konuma	Japan
Ten Nights of Dreams		Seijun Suzuki	Japan
Tsuchi / Earth (1939)	土	Tomu Uchida	Japan
Unholy Desire / Intentions of Murder (1964)	赤い殺意	Shōhei Imamura	Japan
The Warped Ones (1960)	狂熱の季節	Koreyoshi Kurahara	Japan
The Woman with Red Hair (1979)	赫い髪の女	Tatsumi Kumashiro	Japan
The World of Geisha (1973)	(四畳半襖の裏張り	Tatsumi Kumashiro	Japan
