= Ichikawa Raizō (lineage) =

Stage name used by Kabuki actors

Ichikawa Raizō (市川 雷蔵) is a stage name used by Kabuki actors, beginning with a student of Ichikawa Danjūrō II; the use of the name 'Ichikawa' therefore emphasizes this connection.

In a 2014 blog post, Ichikawa Ebizō XI (Ichikawa Danjūrō XIII since 2019, following the death of his father, Ichikawa Danjūrō XII, in 2013) stated that the honorific names Ichikawa Raizō, Ichikawa Jukai, and Ichikawa Kudanji were not currently in use ("vacant seats"), and thus it can be seen as having been returned to the Ichikawa house and line following Raizō VIII's death.

== Lineage ==
- Ichikawa Raizō I (1724–67): student of Ichikawa Danjūrō II.
- Ichikawa Raizō II (1754–78): son of Ichikawa Raizō I.
- Ichikawa Raizō III (dates unknown): student of Ichikawa Danjūrō V.
- Ichikawa Raizō IV (dates unknown): student of Ichikawa Danjūrō V.
- Ichikawa Raizō V (1820–66): student of Ichikawa Danjūrō VII.
- Ichikawa Raizō VI (1876-1901): student of Ichikawa Danjūrō IX.
- Ichikawa Raizō VII (1890-?): student of Ichikawa Danjūrō IX; ceased acting in the mid-Taisho period, becoming an instructor of traditional Japanese dance.
- Ichikawa Raizō VIII (1931–69): student of Ichikawa Jūkai III; also a film actor. As of 2023, the last to use the name.
