= Ichikawa Shinnosuke =

The Ichikawa family crest (mon)

Ichikawa Shinnosuke (市川 新之助) is a stage name taken on by a series of Kabuki actors of the Ichikawa family. Most of these were blood relatives, though some were adopted into the family.

Shinnosuke, like other actors' names, is bestowed (or given up) at grand naming ceremonies called shūmei in which a number of actors formally change their names. A number of actors have followed a particular sequence in their stage names, following their time as Ichikawa Shinnosuke by being granted the names Ichikawa Ebizō or Ichikawa Danjūrō.

The design of the Ichikawa family mon, three squares nested inside one another, is called mimasu (三升).

== Lineage ==
- Ichikawa Shinnosuke I (August 1794–1797) – Later, Ebizō V and Danjūrō VII. Established the Kabuki Jūhachiban.
- Ichikawa Shinnosuke II (November 1823 – February 1825) – Son of Shinnosuke I. Later became Danjūrō VIII.
- Ichikawa Shinnosuke III (until February 1844) – Son of Shinnosuke I. Later became Ebizō VII.
- Ichikawa Shinnosuke IV (from July 1863) – Son of Shinnosuke I. Later became Ebizō VIII.
- Ichikawa Shinnosuke V (May 1913 – January 1957) – husband of daughter of Danjūrō IX.
- Ichikawa Shinnosuke VI (May 1958 – October 1969) – Son of Danjūrō XI, later became Danjūrō XII.
- Ichikawa Shinnosuke VII (May 1985 – April 2004) – Son of Shinnosuke VI. Later, Ichikawa Ebizō XI, the actor currently bearing that name.
- Ichikawa Shinnosuke VIII (May 2020 –) – Son of Shinnosuke VII.

=== Others ===
- Kataoka Nizaemon VIII (lived 1810 – 16 February 1863) is not formally acknowledged as a member of the lineage, though he was adopted by Danjūrō VII and called Ichikawa Shinnosuke VI for a few years during his childhood. Kamigata actor.
- Ichikawa Komazō VI a son of Danjūrō VII, held the name Shinnosuke for a short time in his childhood, but is not counted in the lineage.
