= Ichikawa (surname) =

Ichikawa (written: 市川 lit. "market river") is a Japanese surname. Notable people with the surname include:

- Akinori Ichikawa (市川 暉記; born 1998), Japanese football player
- Ichikawa Danjūrō and Ichikawa Ebizō, stage names taken on by a series of kabuki actors of the Ichikawa family since the 17th century
- Daisuke Ichikawa (born 1980), Japanese football player
- Fusae Ichikawa (1893–1981), Japanese feminist, politician and women's suffrage leader
- Gia Keitaro Ichikawa (stage name Gia Gunn, born 1990), American drag queen
- Haruko Ichikawa (市河晴子 or 市川晴子) (1896–1943), Japanese writer
- Haruyo Ichikawa (1913–2004), Japanese film actress
- Jun Ichikawa (1948–2008), Japanese film director
- Kon Ichikawa (1915–2008), Japanese film director
- Ichikawa Kumehachi (市川 九女八; 1846–1913), Japanese actress
- Mayumi Ichikawa (born 1976), Japanese long-distance runner
- Mikako Ichikawa (born 1978), Japanese actress and model, sister of Miwako
- Miori Ichikawa (born 1994), former member of NMB48
- Miwako Ichikawa (born 1976), Japanese actress, sister of Mikako
- Miyo Ichikawa (市川 美余; born 1989), Japanese actress
- Raizo Ichikawa (1931–1969), Japanese film and kabuki actor
- Saou Ichikawa (born 1979), Japanese author
- Stalker Ichikawa (born 1974), Japanese wrestler
- Taichi Ichikawa (市川太一), Japanese voice actor
- Takuji Ichikawa (born 1962), Japanese novelist
- Tatsuo Ichikawa (市川 辰雄; 1916–?), Japanese ice hockey player
- Tomoya Ichikawa (市川 友也; born 1985), Japanese baseball player
- Takahito Ichikawa (born 1991), Japanese para snowboarder
- Travis Ishikawa (born 1983), American baseball player and coach
- Utaemon Ichikawa, (1907–1999), Japanese film actor
- Yoshiko Ichikawa (born 1976), Japanese long-distance runner
- Yosuke Ichikawa, keyboard player in the Japanese male pop band, The Babystars
- Yui Ichikawa (born 1986), Japanese actress and model, also known as Yui-nyan
- Yuichi Ichikawa, from the Japanese band the Indigo
- Yuki Ichikawa (市川 祐樹; born 1987), Japanese footballer

== Fictional characters ==
- Hiroshi Ichikawa, a character from the anime series Hungry Heart: Wild Striker
- Hiroshi and Utako Ichikawa, a character from the manga and anime series Kaibutsu-kun
- Koyuki Ichikawa, a.k.a. Baaya, a character from the anime and manga series Ojamajo Doremi
- Kyotaro Ichikawa, the main character from the manga and anime series The Dangers in My Heart
- Mayura Ichikawa, a character from the anime series Best Student Council
- Reiko Ichikawa, a character from the anime series Infinite Ryvius
