= Kanjinchō =

Kabuki play

Kanjinchō 勧進帳
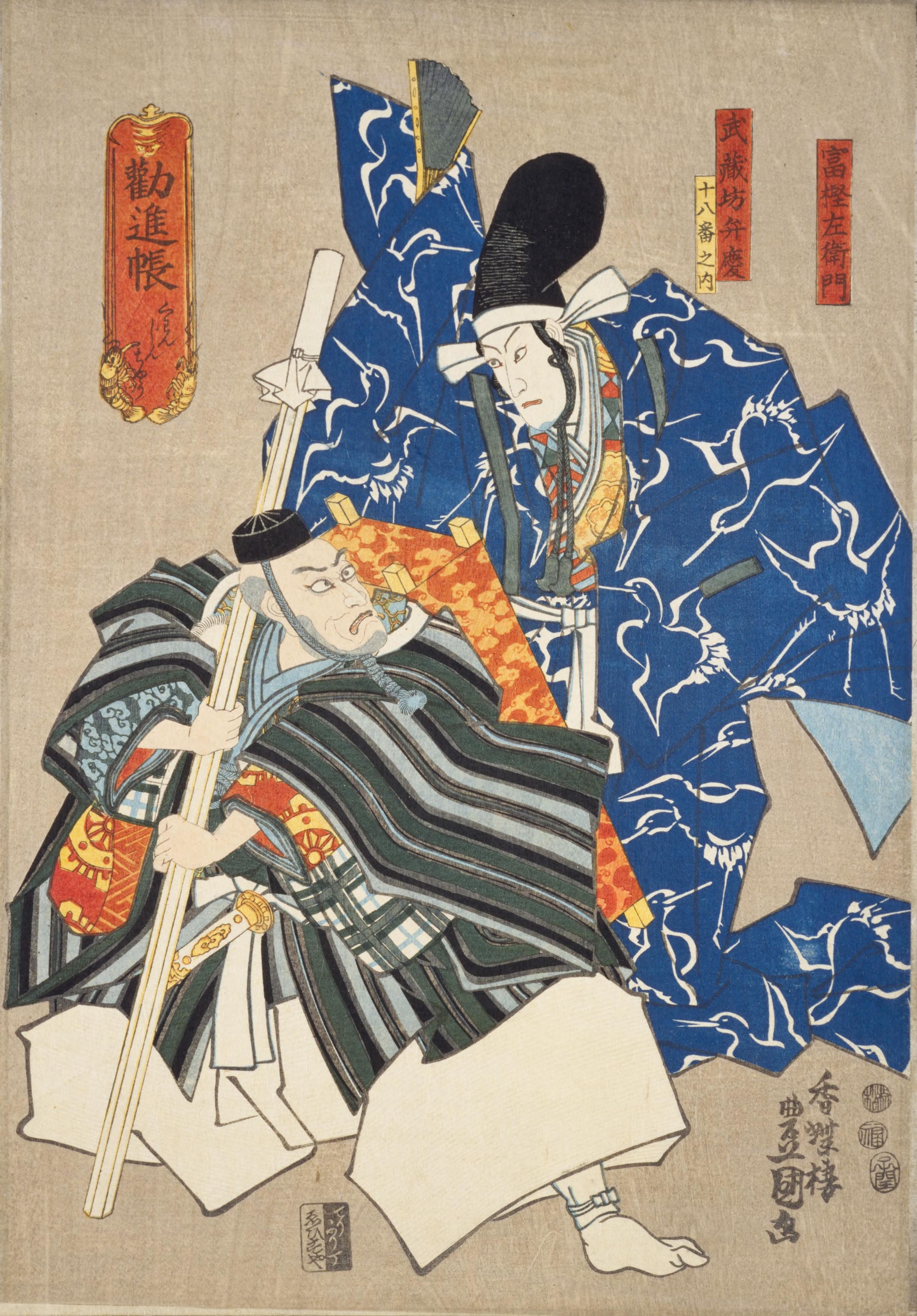
- Ichikawa Ebizō V as Benkei (front) and Ichikawa Danjūrō VIII as Togashi in the 1840 production of Kanjinchō
- Written by: Namiki Gohei III
- Characters: Yoshitsune, Benkei, Togashi
- Original language: Japanese
- Genre: jidaimono shosagoto
- Setting: A gate on a post road, c. 1160–80.

Premiere
- Date premiered: March 1840
- Place premiered: Kawarazaki-za, Edo

Kanjinchō (勧進帳, The Subscription List) is a kabuki dance-drama by Namiki Gohei III, based on the Noh play Ataka. It is one of the most popular plays in the modern kabuki repertory.

Belonging to the repertories of the Naritaya and Kōritaya guilds, the play was first performed in March 1840 at the Kawarazaki-za, in Edo. Ichikawa Ebizō V, Ichikawa Kuzō II, and Ichikawa Danjūrō VIII played the leading roles of Benkei, Togashi, and Yoshitsune, respectively. The lines of Ichikawa Danjūrō and Matsumoto Kōshirō have come to be particularly celebrated for playing the role of Benkei in Kanjinchō.

Kanjinchō was the first kabuki played adapted closely from the Noh theater.

Though bearing the same name and general narrative concept as a 1702 play, one of the Kabuki Jūhachiban, the modern version of Kanjinchō, going back to 1840, is believed to not be directly derived from or connected to this earlier aragoto piece.

Akira Kurosawa's film The Men who Tread on the Tiger's Tail is partly based on Kanjinchō.

Kanjinchō is performed so often that it is said that seasoned kabuki actors consider it an insult to be asked to rehearse it.

== Summary ==
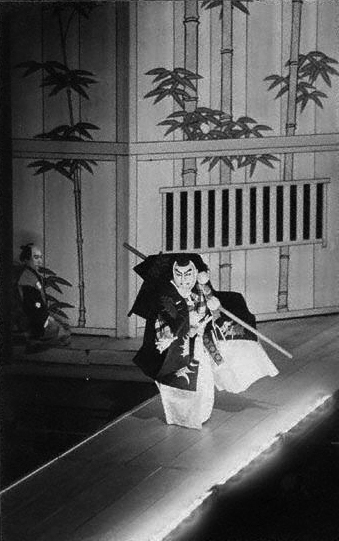
Ichikawa Ennosuke II performing Benkei's signature roppō on the hanamichi

Taking place in the mid- to late 12th century, the play begins with Togashi Saemon, a local noble, just having been charged with defending a particular gate along the road. He warns his men to be vigilant, for Minamoto no Yoshitsune, the great warrior of the Minamoto clan, is said to be traveling on the road, disguised as a yamabushi.

Yoshitsune and his follower Benkei enter to music, and when stopped by Togashi's men, claim that they are simple priests journeying around the northern provinces, seeking donations for the Tōdai-ji in Nara. Togashi thus asks that they prove themselves to be priests and asks for a kanjinchō, a subscription list of those who have donated already. Benkei, having been a mountain ascetic (yamabushi), is educated in traditional Buddhist teachings and has little trouble passing as a priest. But he does not have a kanjinchō; so, in a particularly famous moment in kabuki, he pulls out a blank scroll and begins reading from it as if it were a real subscription list.

Though Togashi soon gets a look at the blank sheet, he admires Benkei's skill and daring, and after asking a series of difficult questions about Buddhism and the life of a priest, all of which Benkei answers correctly, lets the pair pass anyway.

About to escape entirely, the pair are stopped when one of Togashi's guards notices that the porter looks like Yoshitsune. Benkei, thinking quickly, pretends that Yoshitsune is simply his personal porter and begins to beat him for arousing suspicion and causing trouble. The barrier guard insists that they won't pass unless he checks that the porter is not Yoshitsune, and Benkei accuses him of trying to steal from their baggage. On the verge of starting to fight, Benkei states that, to demonstrate that his porter is not Yoshitsune, he will beat him to death (at the time, beating one's own master was a lèse-majesté crime). Togashi sees through the ruse, but pretends not to, on account of his admiration for Benkei's devotion to his master. Continuing on past the gate, Yoshitsune thanks his friend, who apologizes for beating him and bursts into tears—for, supposedly, the first time in his adult life.

Togashi returns. Asking forgiveness for his manners, he invites Benkei to drink some sake with him. He accepts, but exaggerates with the alcohol and gets drunk. He starts describing some of his memories from his youth, accompanied by the shamisen ensemble, and then asks Togashi for more sake. Togashi asks instead that Benkei dance for him.

Benkei then starts to perform the "dance of longevity." At one point, he signals Yoshitsune to depart while the barrier guards are not watching. As Benkei leaves, he turns one last time to Togashi, whom he knows now has to pay with his own life for helping the enemy.

As the curtain falls, with Benkei alone on the hanamichi, he thanks the gods for allowing his master to pass. The play ends with Benkei performing a special roppō, a Kabuki technique for leaving the scene, called Tobiroppō, jumping on the hanamichi.

== Translation ==
The play was translated into English by James R. Brandon and Tamako Niwa in Kabuki Plays (The Zen Substitute and The Subscription List), published in 1966.

- Kabuki Plays (The Zen Substitute and The Subscription List). (1966) New York: Samuel French, ISBN 978-0573622601.
