= Shinnosuke (given name) =

- Gender: Male

Origin
- Origin: Japanese
- Meaning: Different meanings depending on the kanji used

Shinnosuke (written: 真之介, 慎之介, 慎之助, 新之介, 新之助, 新乃輔, 槙之輔, 進之介, 伸之介 or 眞之亮) is a masculine Japanese given name and surname. Notable people with the name include:

- Shinnosuke Abe (阿部 慎之助; born 1979), Japanese baseball player
- Shinnosuke Furumoto (古本 新乃輔; born 1969), Japanese voice actor
- Shinnosuke Hatanaka (畠中 槙之輔; born 1995), Japanese footballer
- Shinnosuke Kakinaga (垣永 真之介; born 1991), Japanese rugby union player
- Shinnosuke Mitsushima (満島 真之介; born 1989), Japanese actor
- Shinnosuke Nakatani (中谷 進之介; born 1996), Japanese footballer
- Shinnosuke Ogasawara (小笠原 慎之介; born 1997), Japanese baseball player
- Shinnosuke Oka (岡 慎之助; born 2003), Japanese gymnast
- Shinnosuke Shigenobu (重信 慎之介; born 1993), Japanese baseball player
- Shinnosuke Tachibana (立花 慎之介; born 1978), Japanese voice actor
- Shinnosuke Tokuda (徳田 新之介; born 1995), Japanese handball player
- Shinnosuke Tsukue (机 伸之介; born 1989), Japanese squash player
- Shinnosuke Yamada (born 1992), Japanese racing driver

== Surname ==
- Ichikawa Shinnosuke (市川 新之助), a stage name taken on by a series of Kabuki actors of the Ichikawa family
- Katsura Shinnosuke (桂 伸乃介; 1952–2020), Japanese rakugoka
- Nakayama Shinnosuke (中山 眞之亮; 1866–1914), the first Shinbashira of Tenrikyo
