= Narita-san =

Buddhist temple in Narita, Japan

Coordinates: 35.78608°N 140.31831°E

Narita-san 成田山 Shinshō-ji 新勝寺
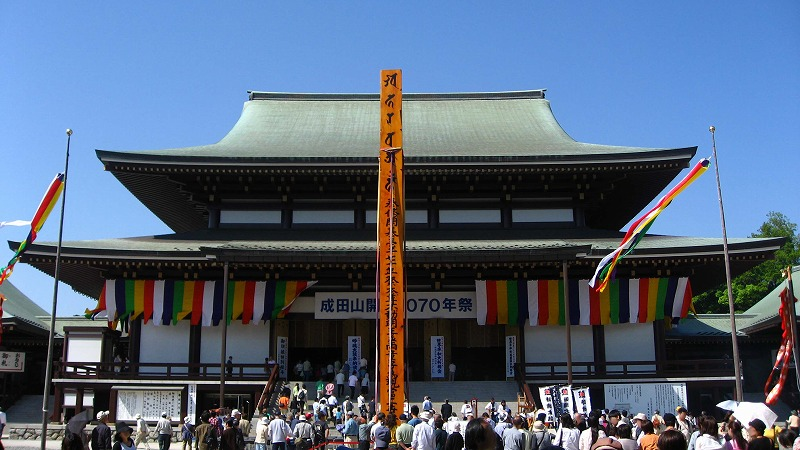
- Great Main Hall

Religion
- Affiliation: Shingon

Location
- Location: 1 Narita, Narita-shi, Chiba prefecture
- Country: Japan
- Interactive map of Narita-san 成田山; Shinshō-ji 新勝寺

Architecture
- Founder: Kanchō Daisōjō
- Completed: 940

Website
- www.naritasan.or.jp

Narita-san (成田山 "Narita mountain") Shinshō-ji (新勝寺 "New victory temple") is a Shingon Buddhist temple located in central Narita, Chiba, Japan. It was founded in 940 by Kanchō Daisōjō, a disciple of Kōbō Daishi. It is a lead temple in the Chisan branch (Chisan-ha 智山派) of New Shingon (Shingi Shingon 新義真言宗), includes a large complex of buildings and grounds, and is one of the best-known temples in the Kantō region. It is dedicated to Ācala (Japanese: Fudō myōō ("Unmovable Wisdom King")) who is usually depicted holding a sword and rope and surrounded by flames. Often called a fire god, he is associated with fire rituals.

== Founding ==
The temple was established in 940 to commemorate the victory of the forces dispatched from the Heian capital to suppress a revolt by the powerful Kantō region samurai, Taira no Masakado. The Shingon priest Kanchō accompanied the force, bringing with him an image of Acala from the Gomadō (Fire Offering Hall) of Takao-san Jingo-ji in Kyōtō. Shingon founder Kōbō Daishi himself was said to have carved the image and used it in Goma sacred fire rituals that helped stop a rebellion during his era. The rebellion in 940 also came to an end just as Kanchō completed a three-week Goma ritual with the same image.

According to legend, the image of Acala became too heavy after the victory to move back to its home base, so a new temple on Narita-san, named Shinshō-ji (New Victory Temple), was built to enshrine it on the spot. The temple maintains that the original image is enshrined in the Main Hall, where it is displayed on special occasions, but art historians date the current image to no earlier than the 13th century.

== Expansion ==
For over 600 years, Narita-san remained a remote, humble, provincial temple—until Tokugawa Ieyasu moved his capital to Edo in 1603. Ieyasu himself credited its abbot with converting him to Buddhism, and assigned the local Sakura Domain daimyō to be responsible for its upkeep. The military and political success associated with the temple may also have appealed to him, and the location of the temple, protecting the unlucky northeast approach to his new capital, corresponded to the position of the head temple of the Tendai sect, Enryaku-ji, relative to the old Heian capital of Kyoto. However, the shogunate did little to support the temple until Tokugawa Ietsuna reconstructed its Main Hall in 1655. That building now serves as a calligraphy classroom. Shingon founder Kōbō Daishi (Kūkai) was famous for his Japanese calligraphy.

But the person most responsible for promoting and enriching Narita-san was Ichikawa Danjūrō I (1660–1704), one of the most influential actors of the golden age of kabuki. Born into a wealthy merchant family with ties to the Narita area, Danjūrō relished his family's former samurai status by playing heroic characters doing noble deeds, developing in the process a rough, manly style known as aragoto. He was also a devout Buddhist with a particular devotion to Fudō myōō, to whom he gave credit for the safe birth of his son Kuzō, who went on to become Ichikawa Danjūrō II (1688–1758). Kuzō played such a ferocious and convincing Fudō in his stage debut in 1697 that the audience responded with prayers and offerings as if they were before a temple deity. In 1703, Danjūrō I wrote and starred in another play specifically about the Fudō at Shinshō-ji, The Avatars of the Fudō of Narita Temple, whose opening was timed to coincide with the traveling exhibit (出開帳 degaichō) of sacred images from Narita-san in Edo. Danjūrō's immense popularity and his attachment to Fudō myōō at Shinshō-ji prompted many commoners of all classes to make regular pilgrimages from Edo to Narita-san.

== Important buildings ==
Several of the structures at Narita-san temple have been designated National Important Cultural Properties: the Kōmyō-dō, built in 1701 and dedicated to the Dainichi Nyorai Buddha (Vairocana), the principal image of Shingon Buddhism; the three-storied, 25-meter high pagoda built in 1712; the Niōmon main gate, built in 1830; the Shaka-dō (Shakyamuni Hall), built in 1858; and the Gaku-dō (Votive Tablet Hall), built in 1861. The Kaizan-dō (Open Mountain Hall) shrine to Kanchō Daisōjō was built in 1938, in time for the temple's 1000th anniversary. Narita-san Park (16.5 hectares) opened in 1928, the current Great Main Hall dates from 1968, a 58-meter high Great Pagoda (Daitō) was added in 1984, and a hall dedicated to Prince Shōtoku, regarded as the father of Japanese Buddhism, was erected in 1992.

A few views of Narita-san, 2020

== Regular events ==
Large crowds attend the major annual events at Narita-san: Oshogatsu in January, Setsubun in February, the taiko drum festival in April, firelight performances of Noh plays in May, the Gion Festival in July, Obon in August; Shichigosan in November; and the annual burning of amulets in late December. People come to Narita-san Park to view ume blossoms in the early spring and autumn leaves in the late fall. In addition, there are chantings of the Sutra of Great Wisdom (Daihannya-e) in January, May, and September; and temple fairs are held on the 1st, 15th, and 28th day of each month. Several times a day, wooden amulets are ceremonially burned in Goma rituals.

== Tourism ==
Narita-san has been a favorite site for excursions and pilgrimages by citizens of the nearby metropolitan area ever since the Tokugawa shōguns moved the national capital to Edo in 1603. After nearby Narita International Airport became the primary international hub for Japanese air traffic in the late 1970s, Narita-san also began to attract increasing numbers of foreign tourists, especially those who have a long layovers in transit. The airport is just a short train ride from either JR East Narita Station or Keisei Narita Station. From each station, it is just a short walk to the temple, along picturesque streets with many small shops selling snacks and other foodstuffs, as well as good-luck charms and other souvenirs, such as Daruma dolls.

== Gallery ==
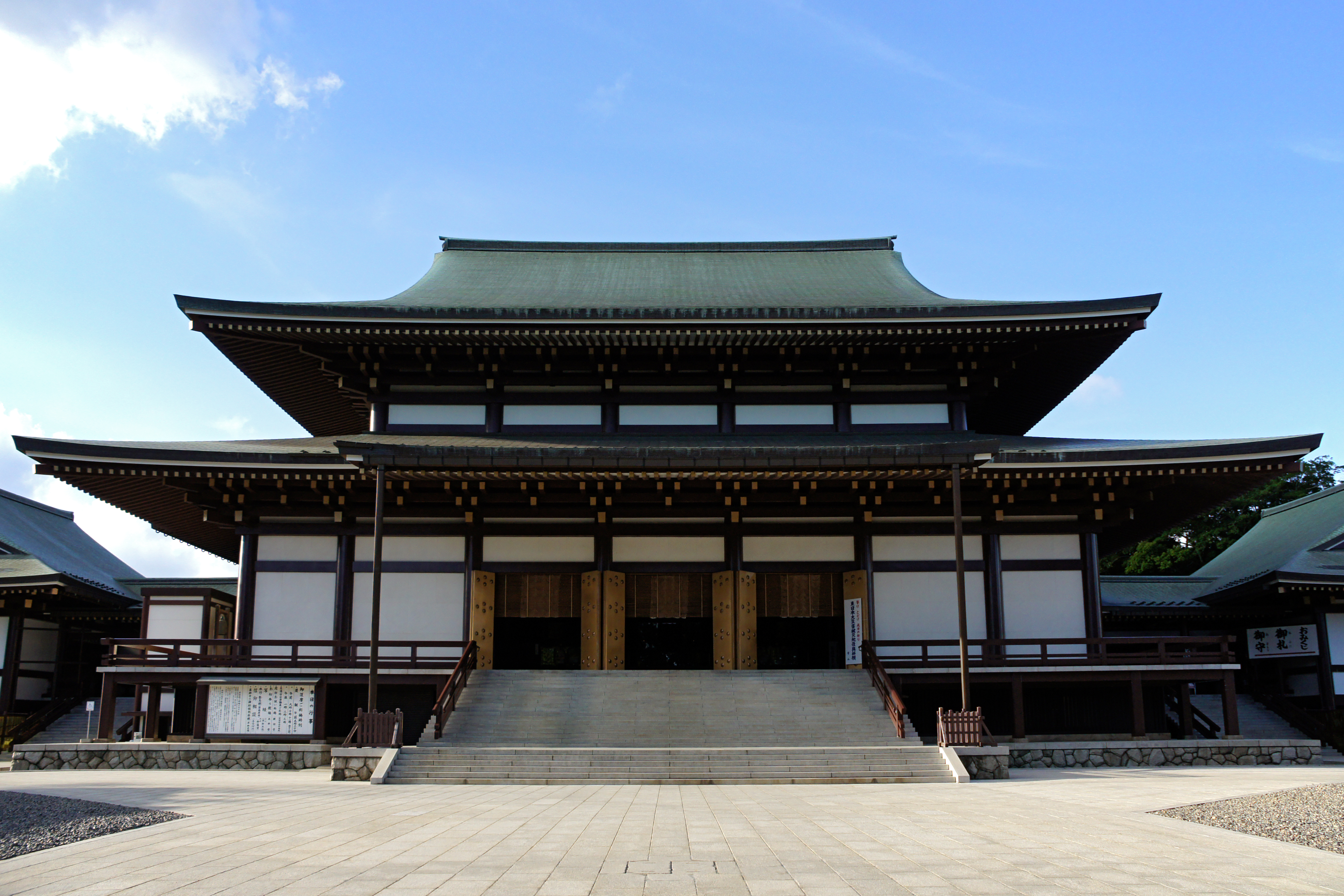
Great Main Hall, 1968

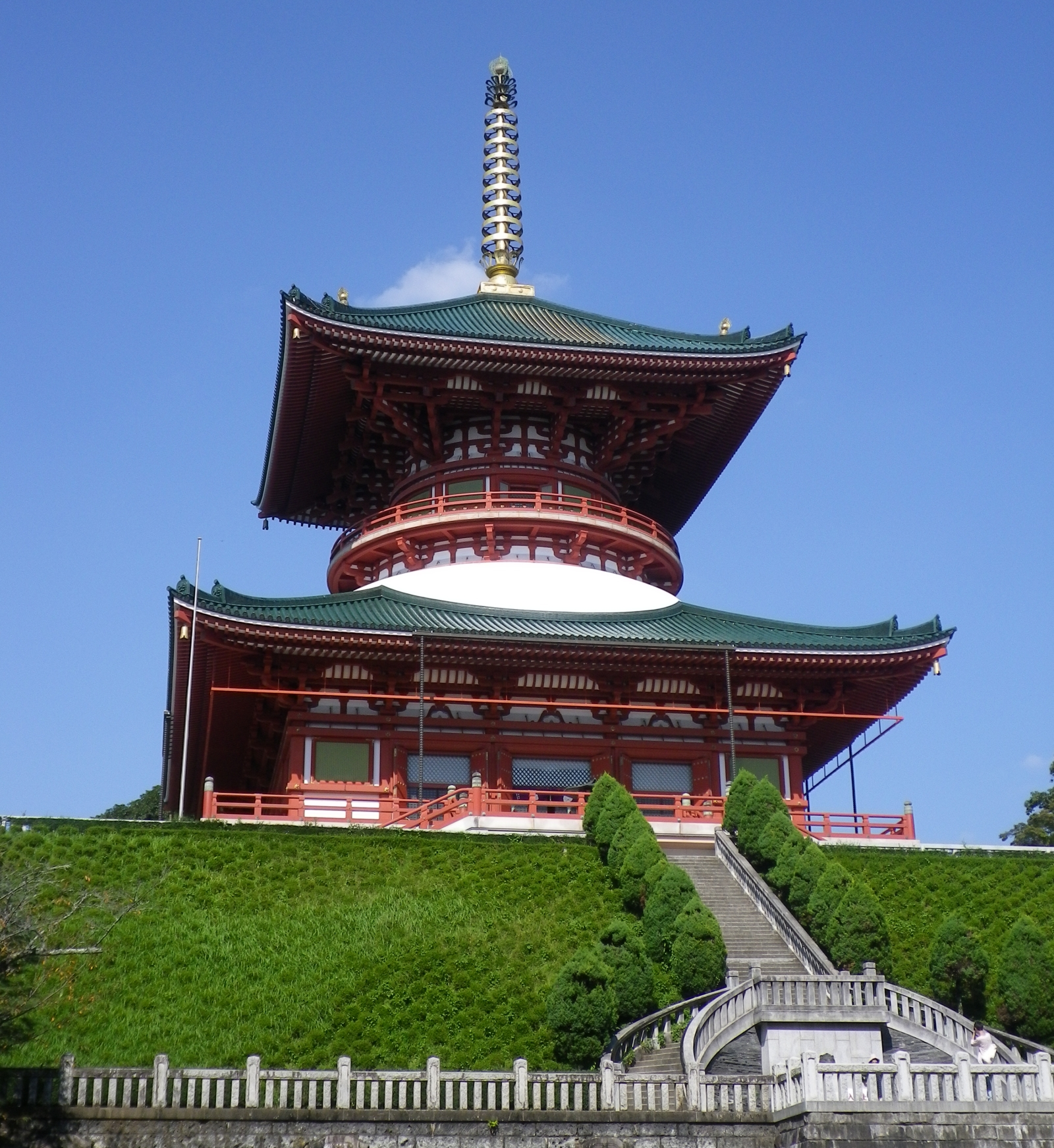
Great Peace Pagoda (Daitō), 1984

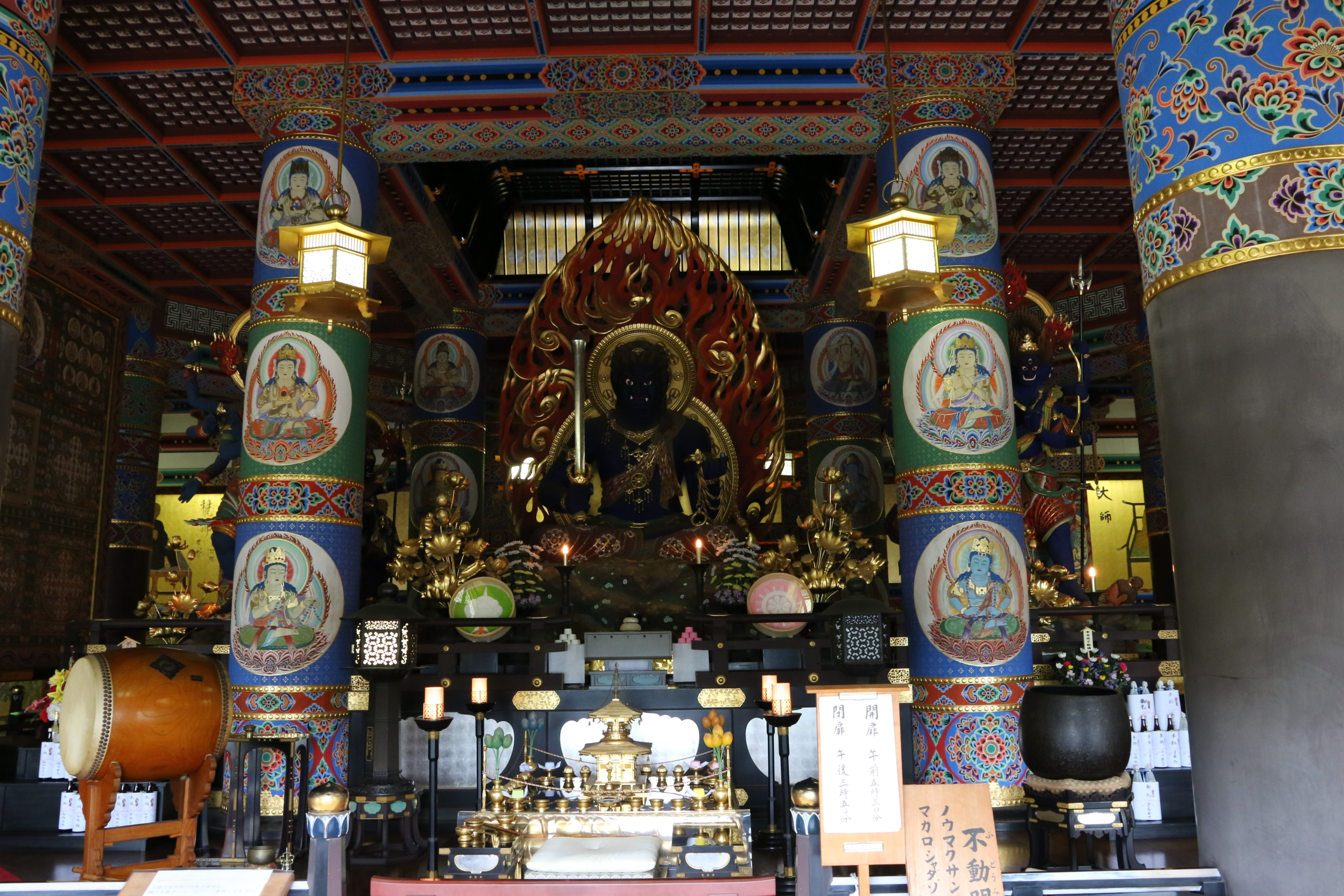
Fudō Myōō (Acala) in the Great Peace Pagoda

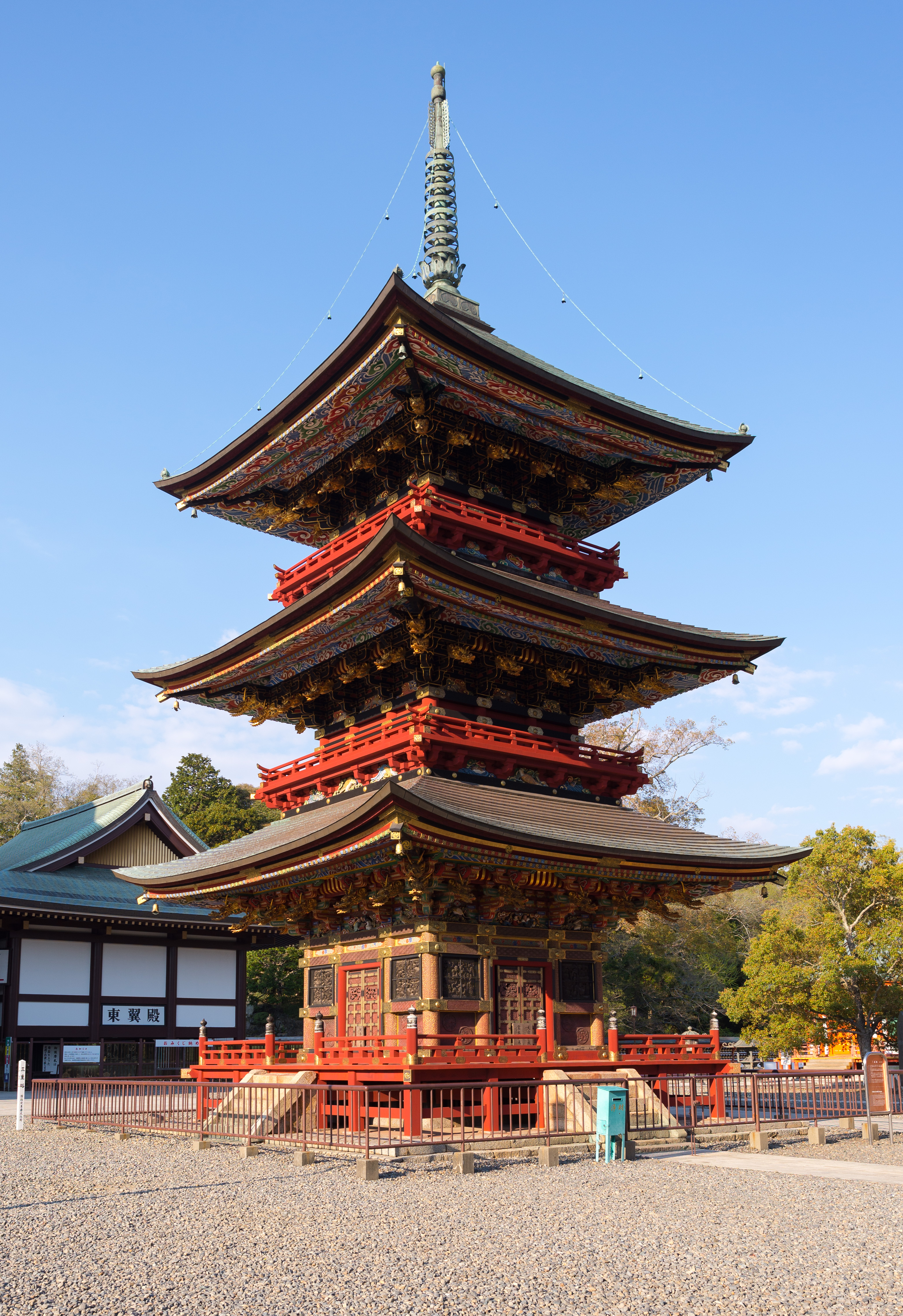
Three-storied pagoda, 1712

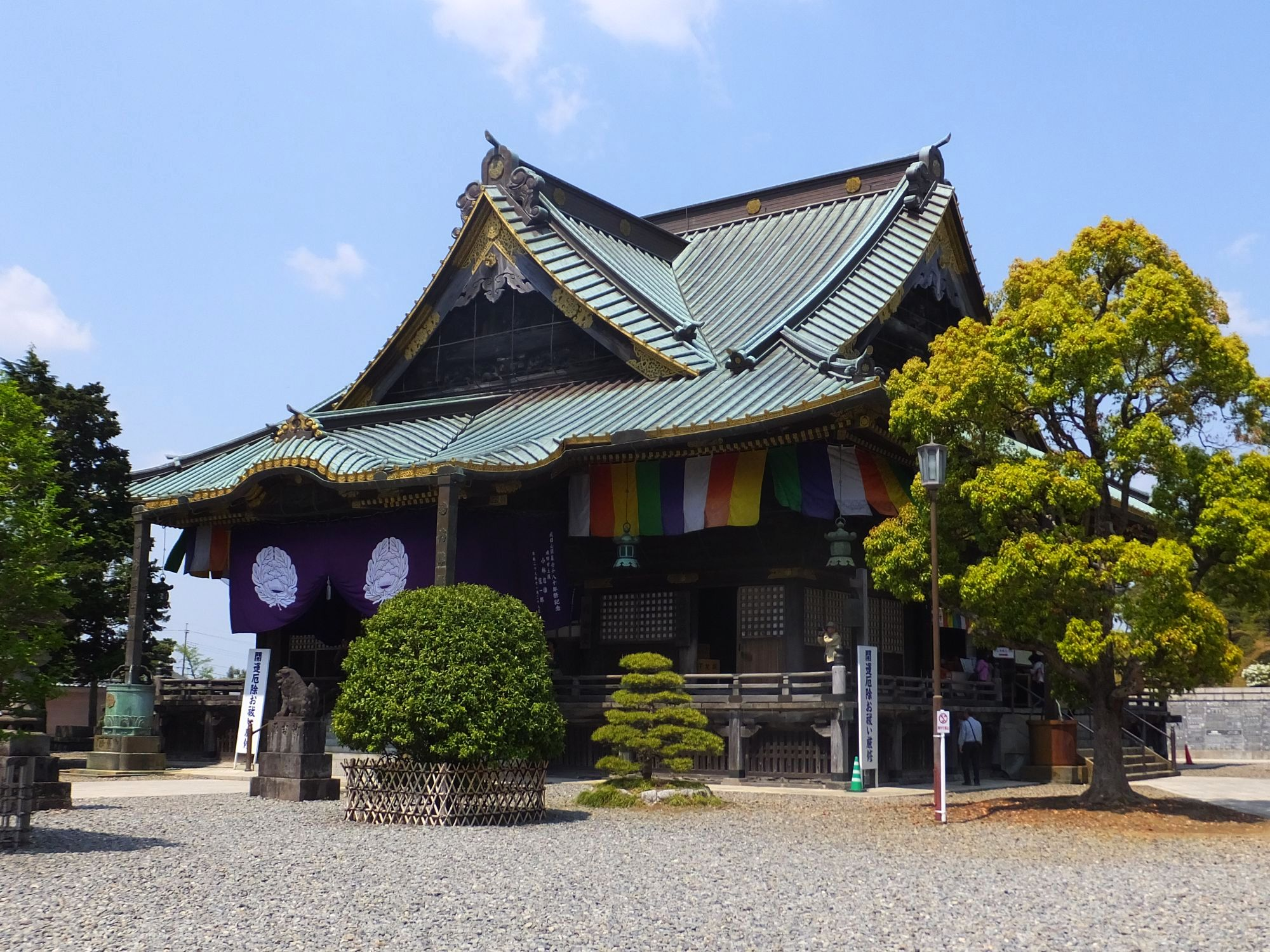
Shaka-dō, 1858

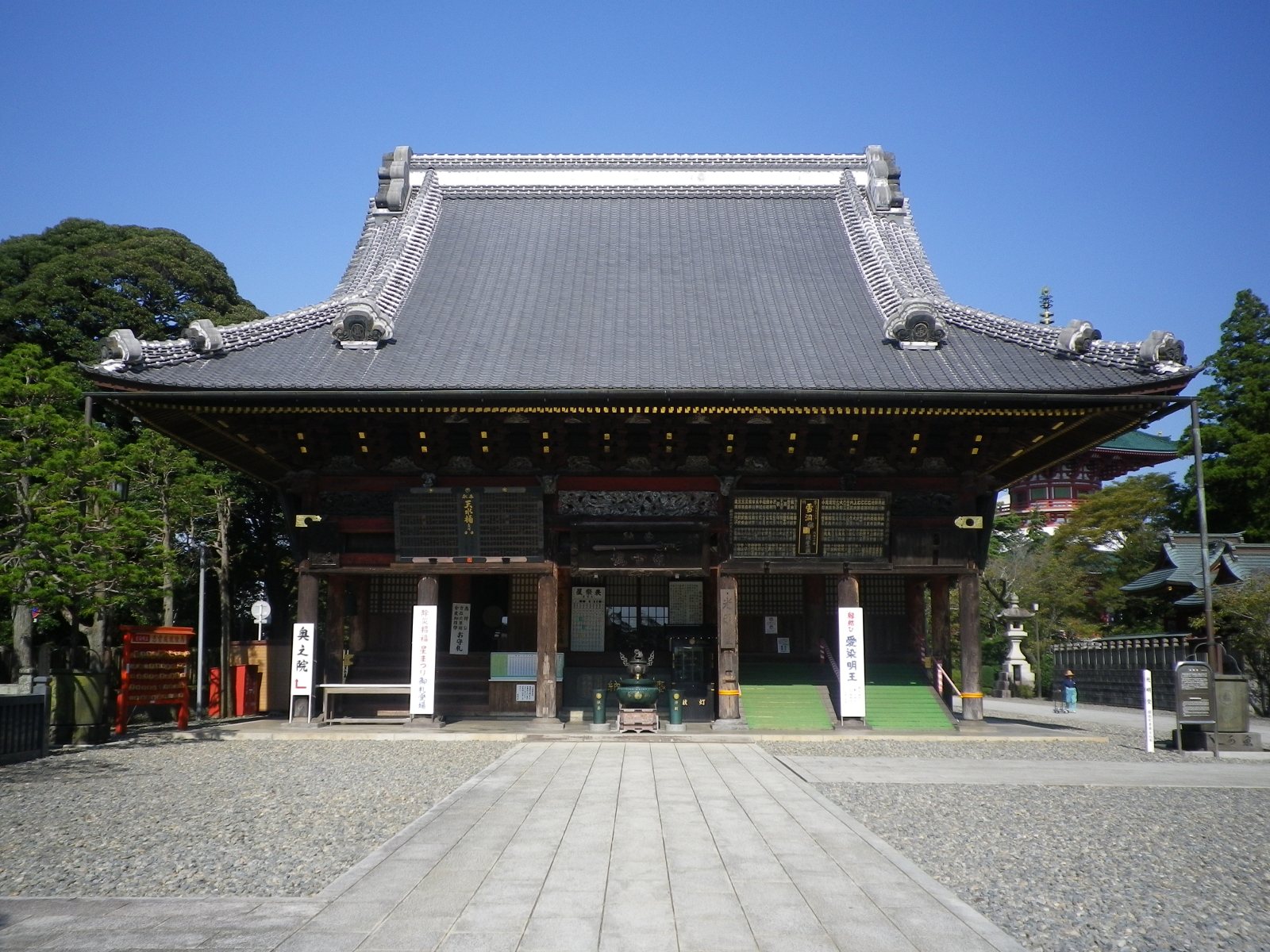
Kōmyō-dō, 1701

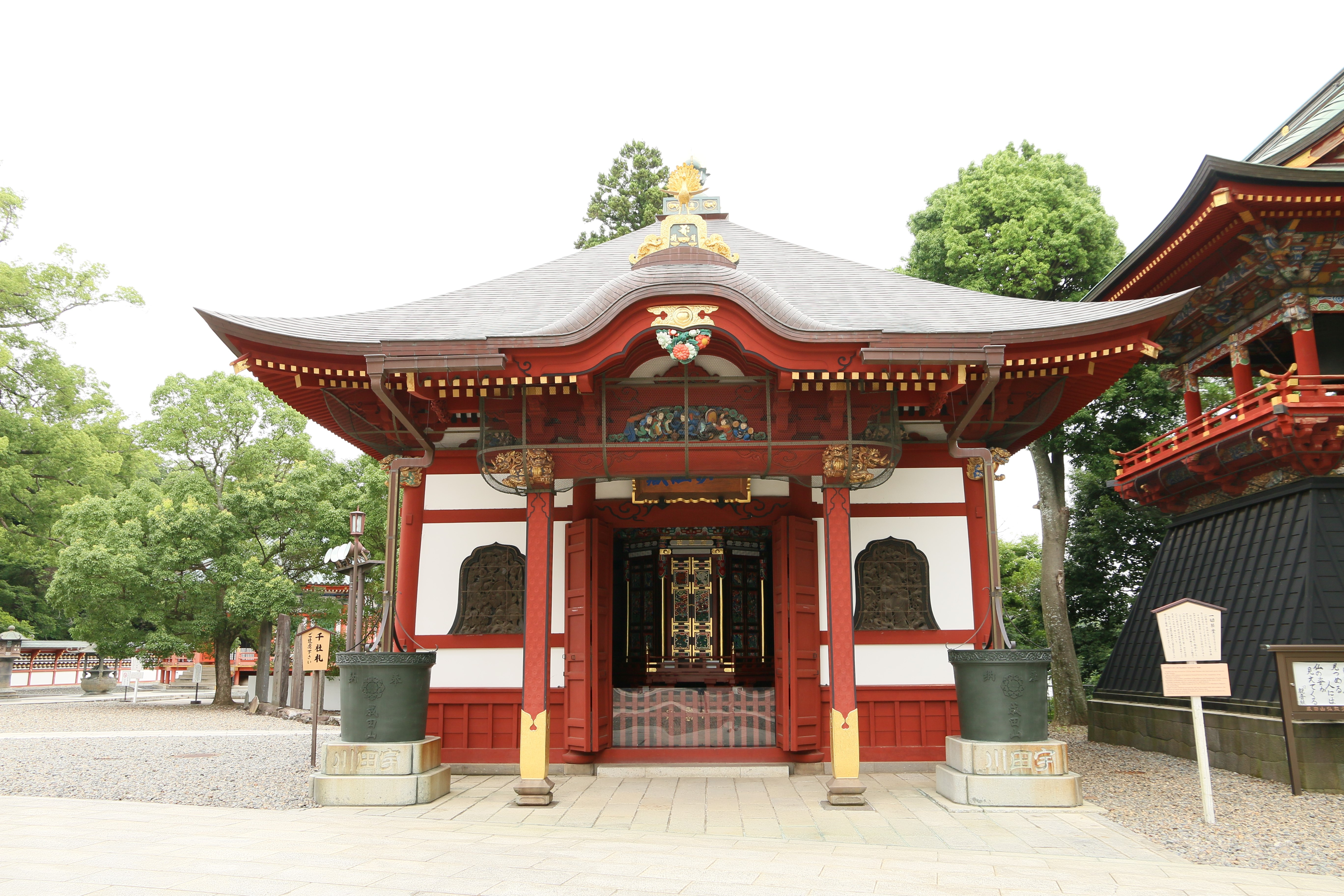
Issaikyō-dō, 1722

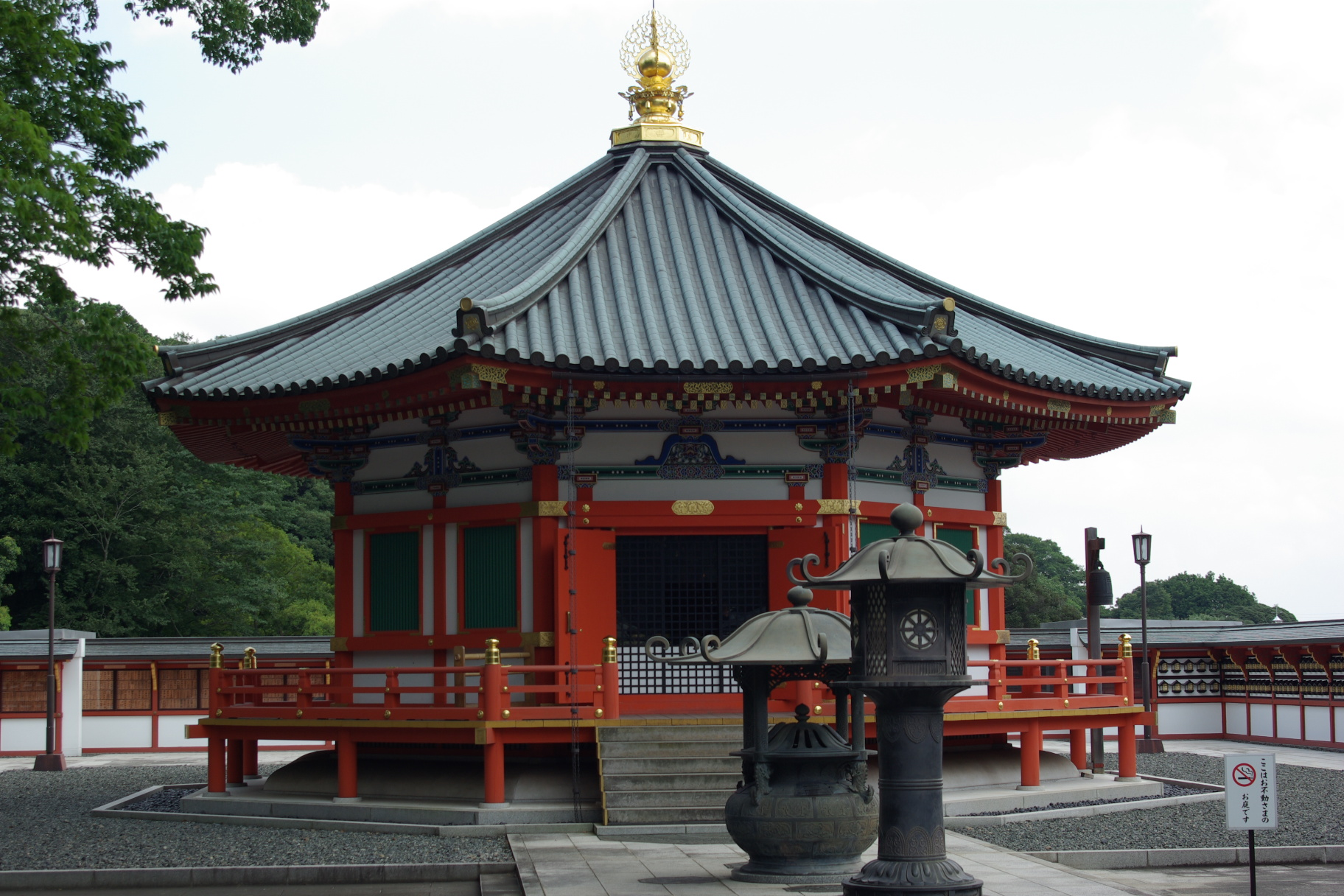
Prince Shōtoku Hall, 1992

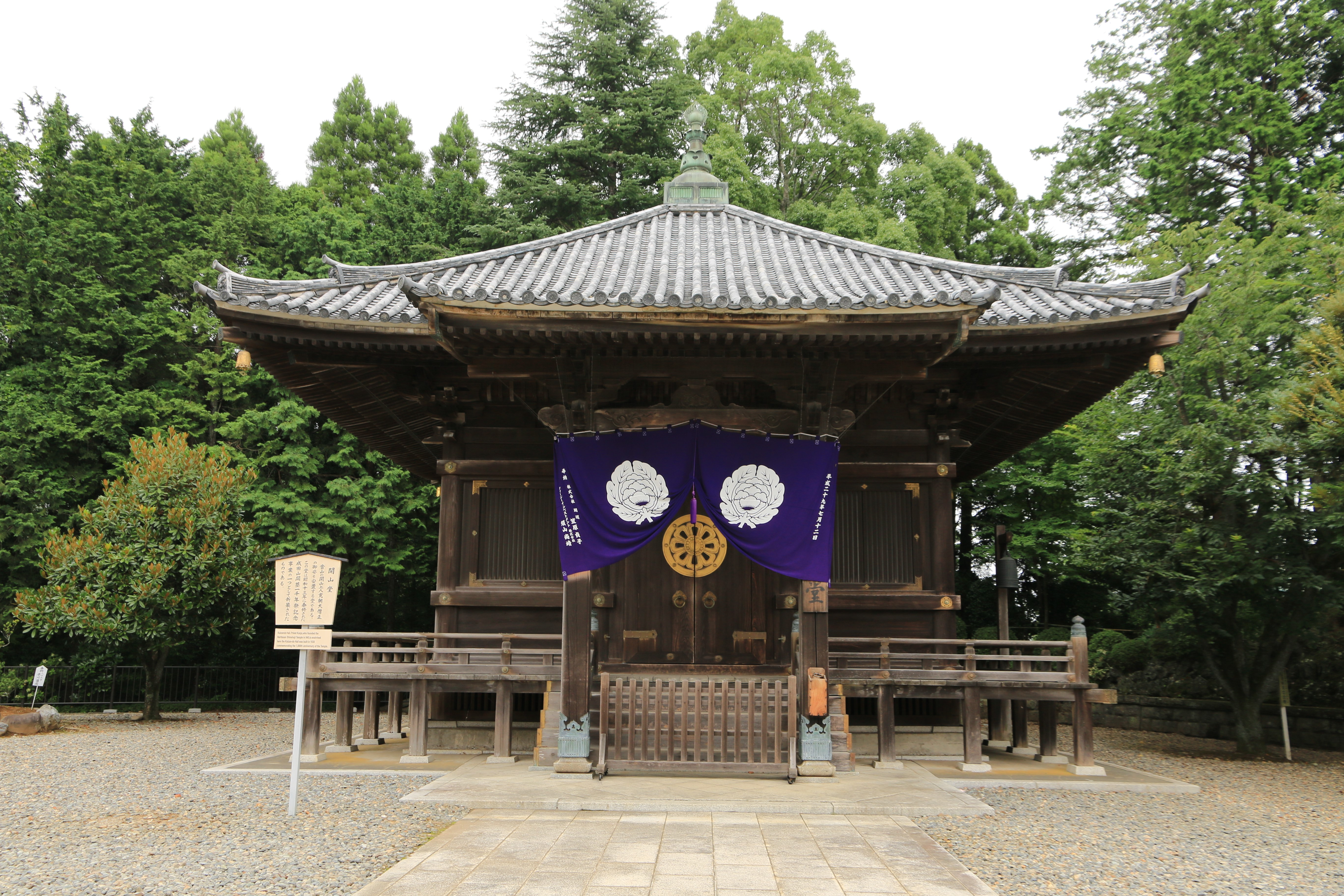
Kaisan-dō, 1938

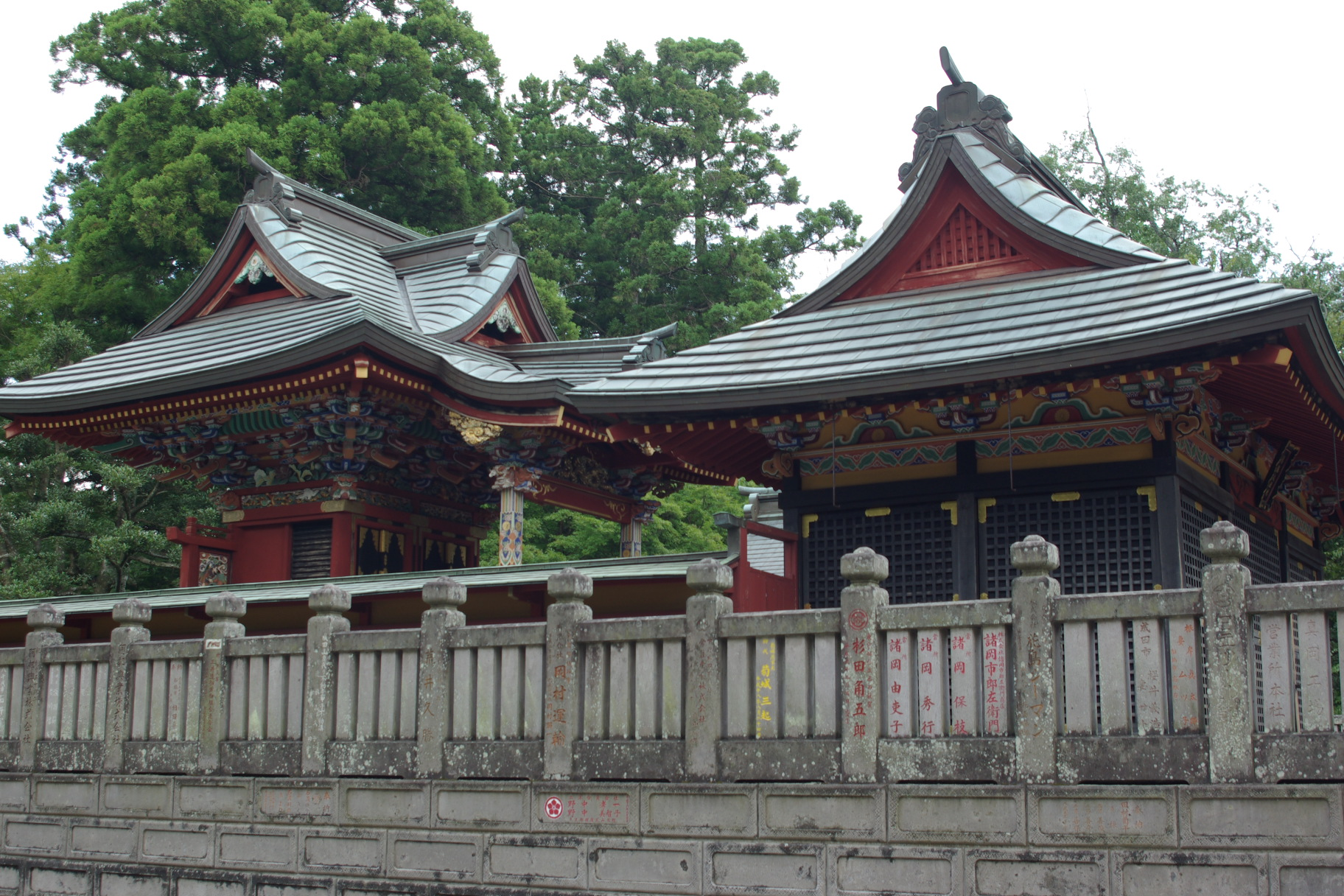
Seiryūgongen-dō

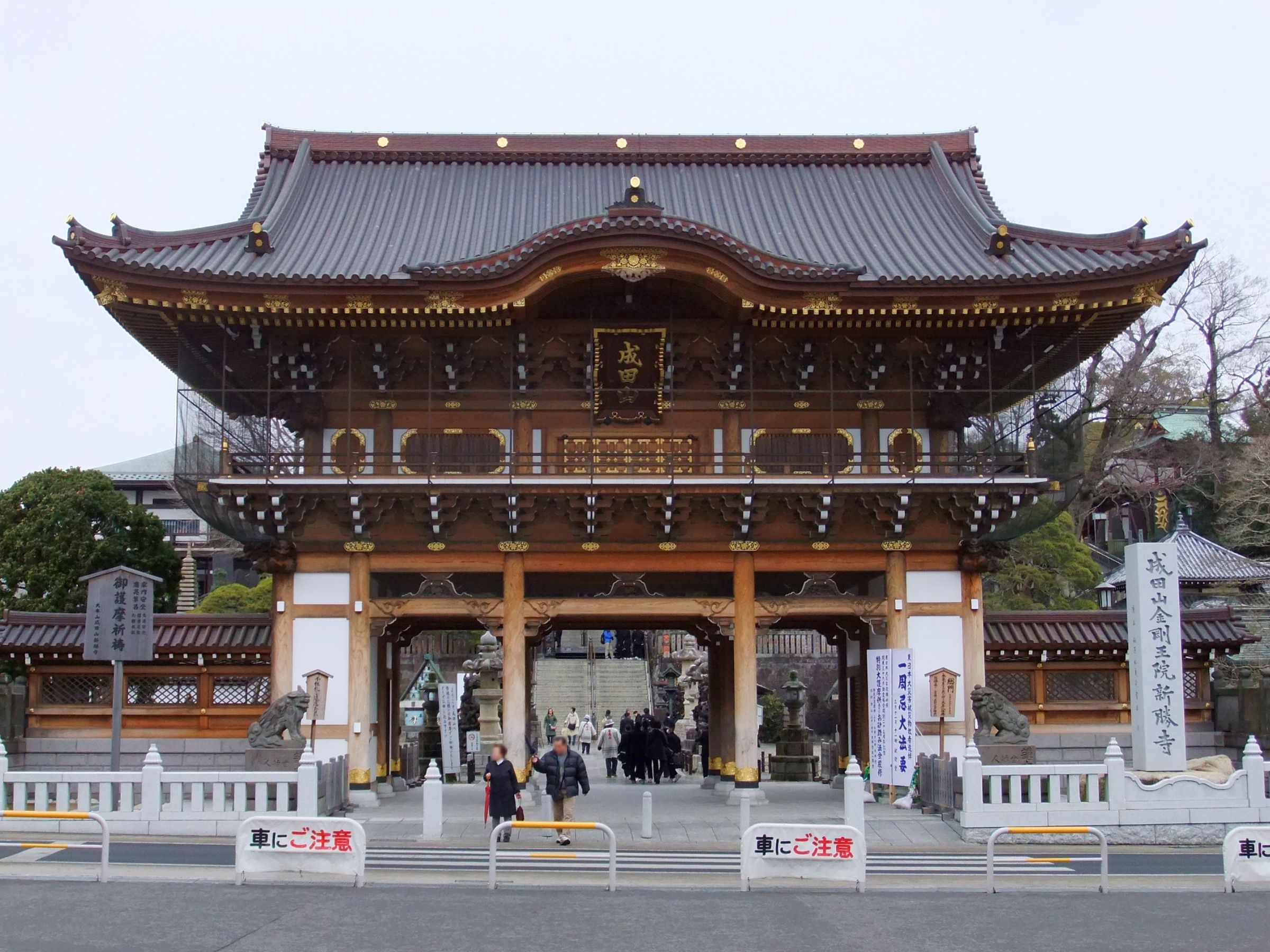
Sōmon entrance, 2008

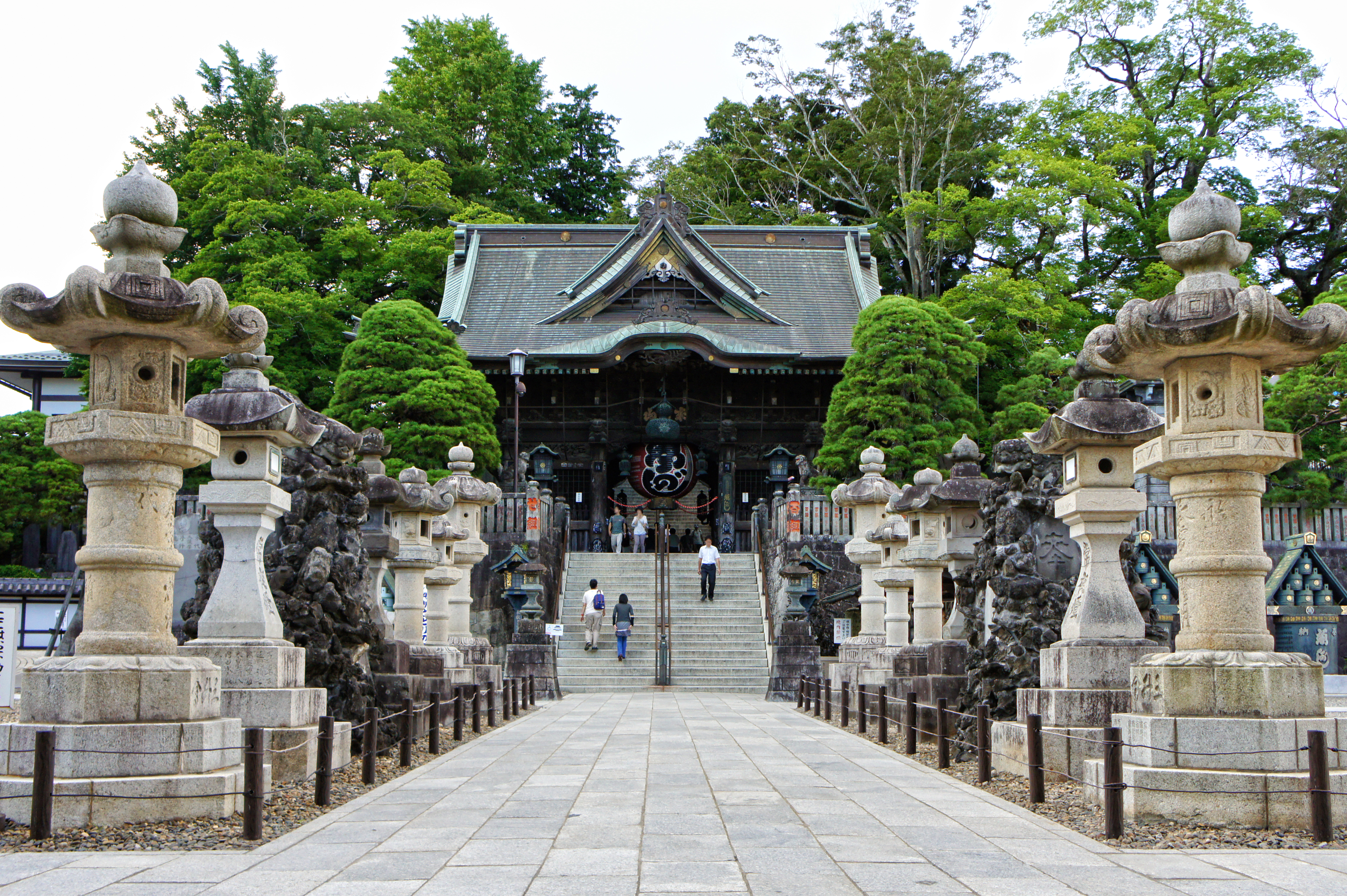
Niōmon gate, 1831

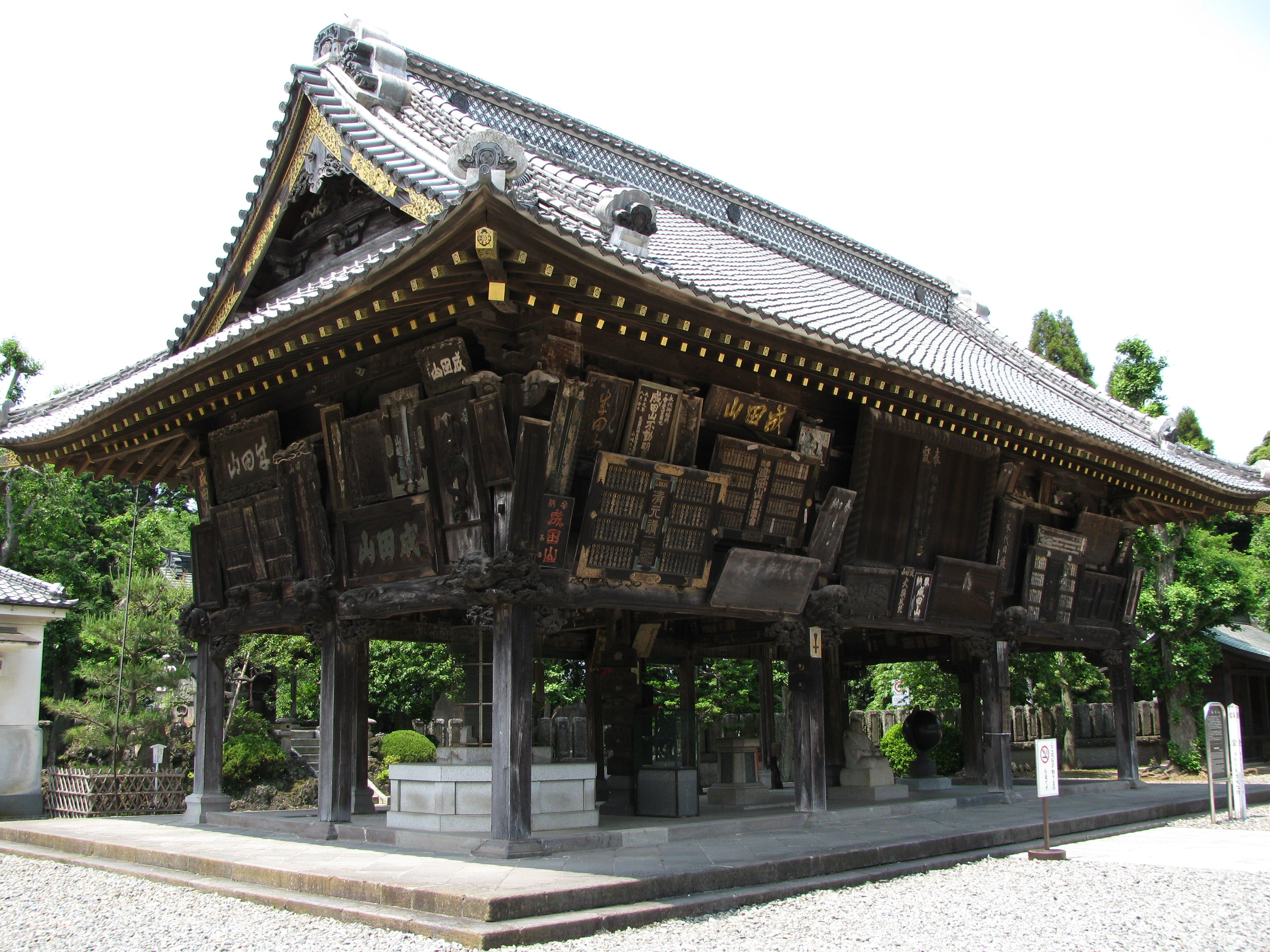
Gaku-dō, 1861

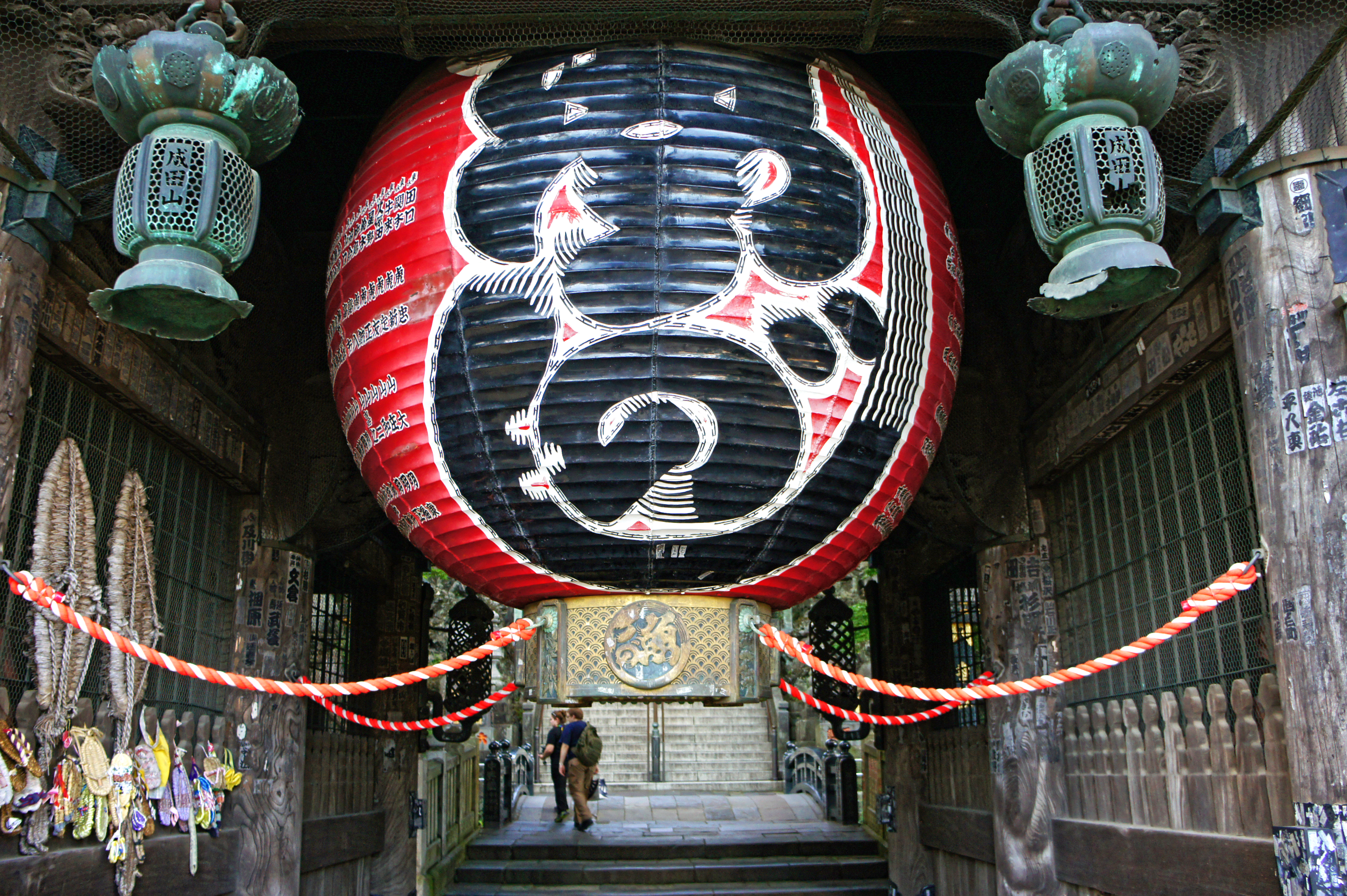
Lantern on the Niōmon

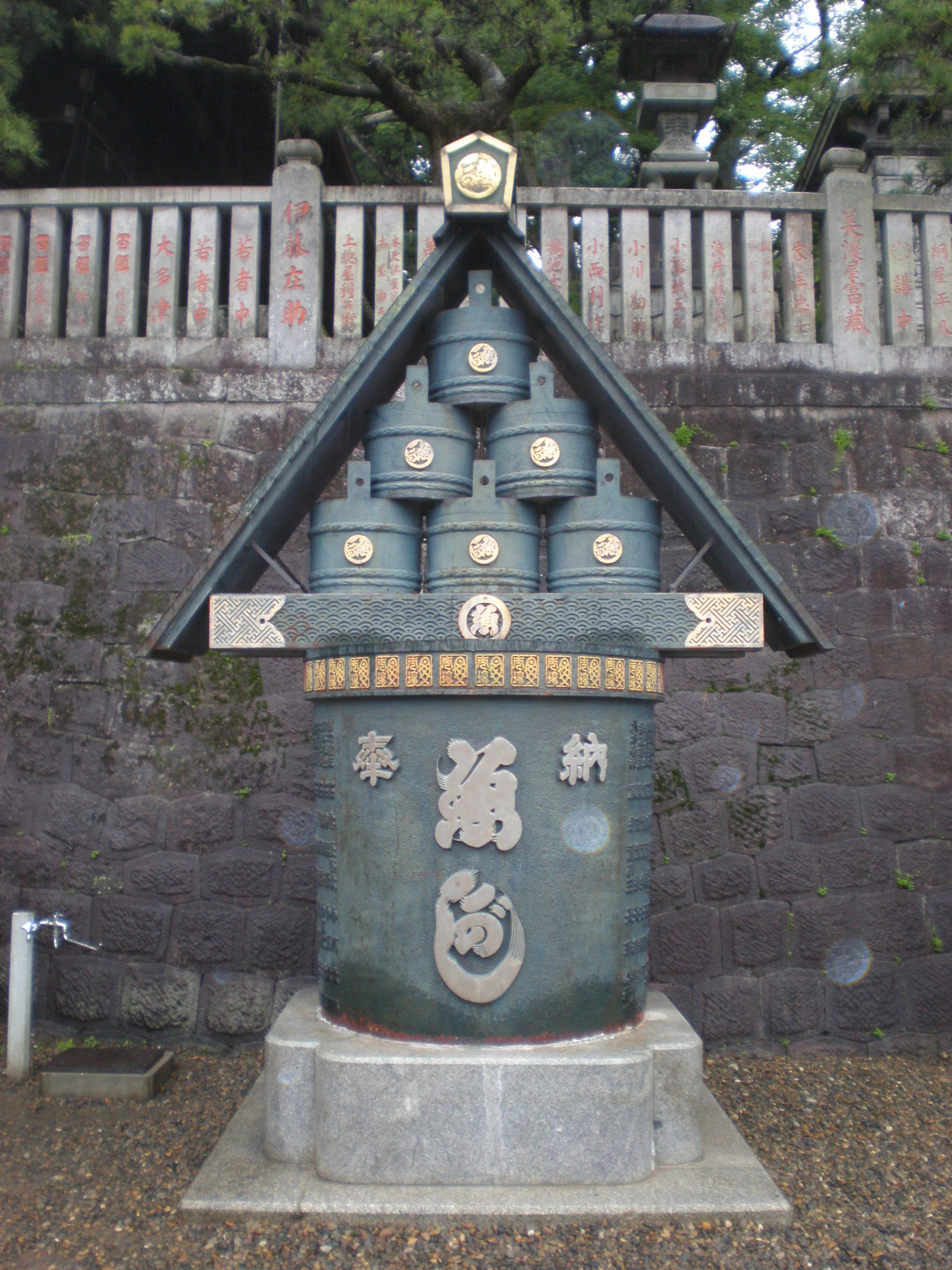
Bucket offerings

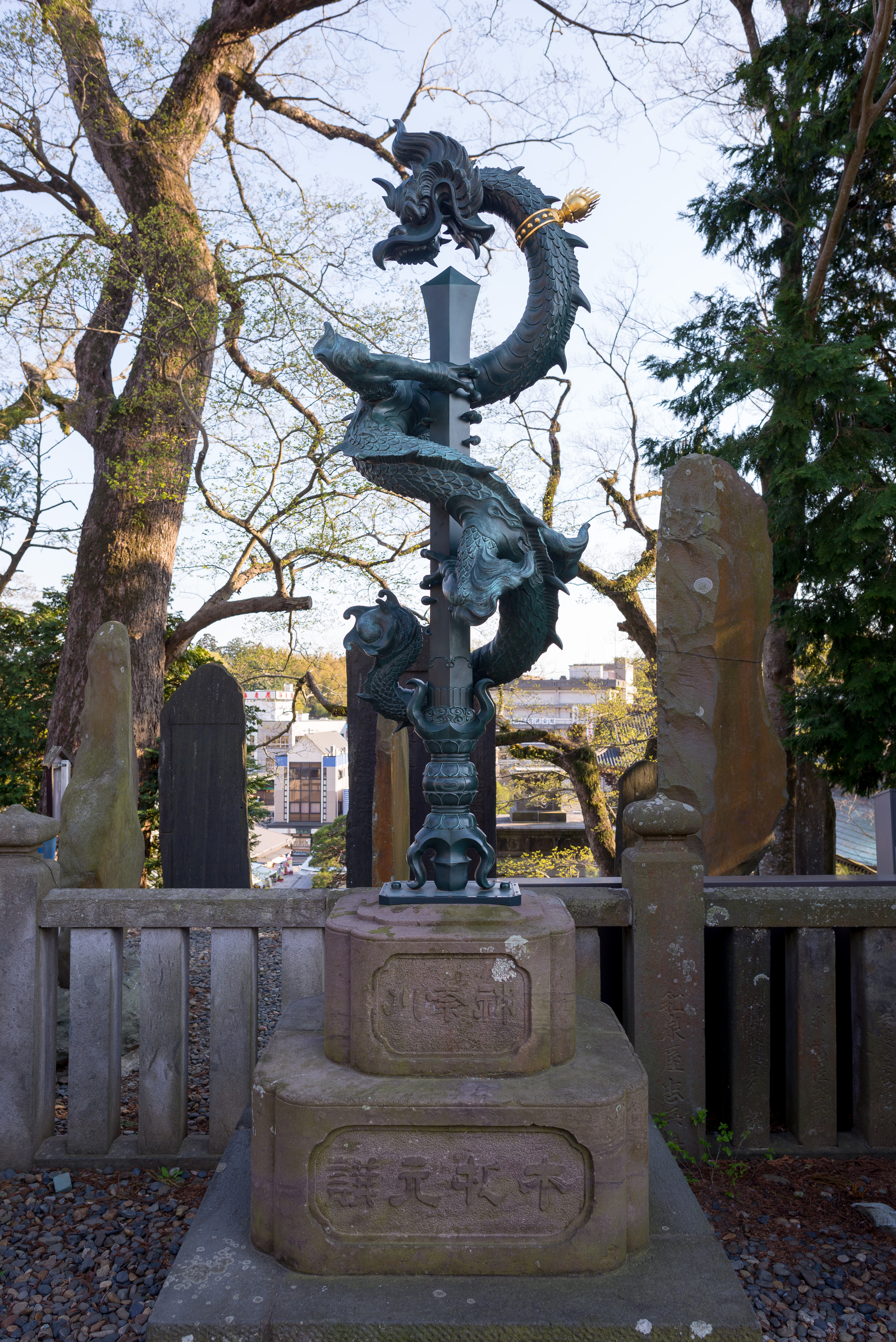
Sword & dragon

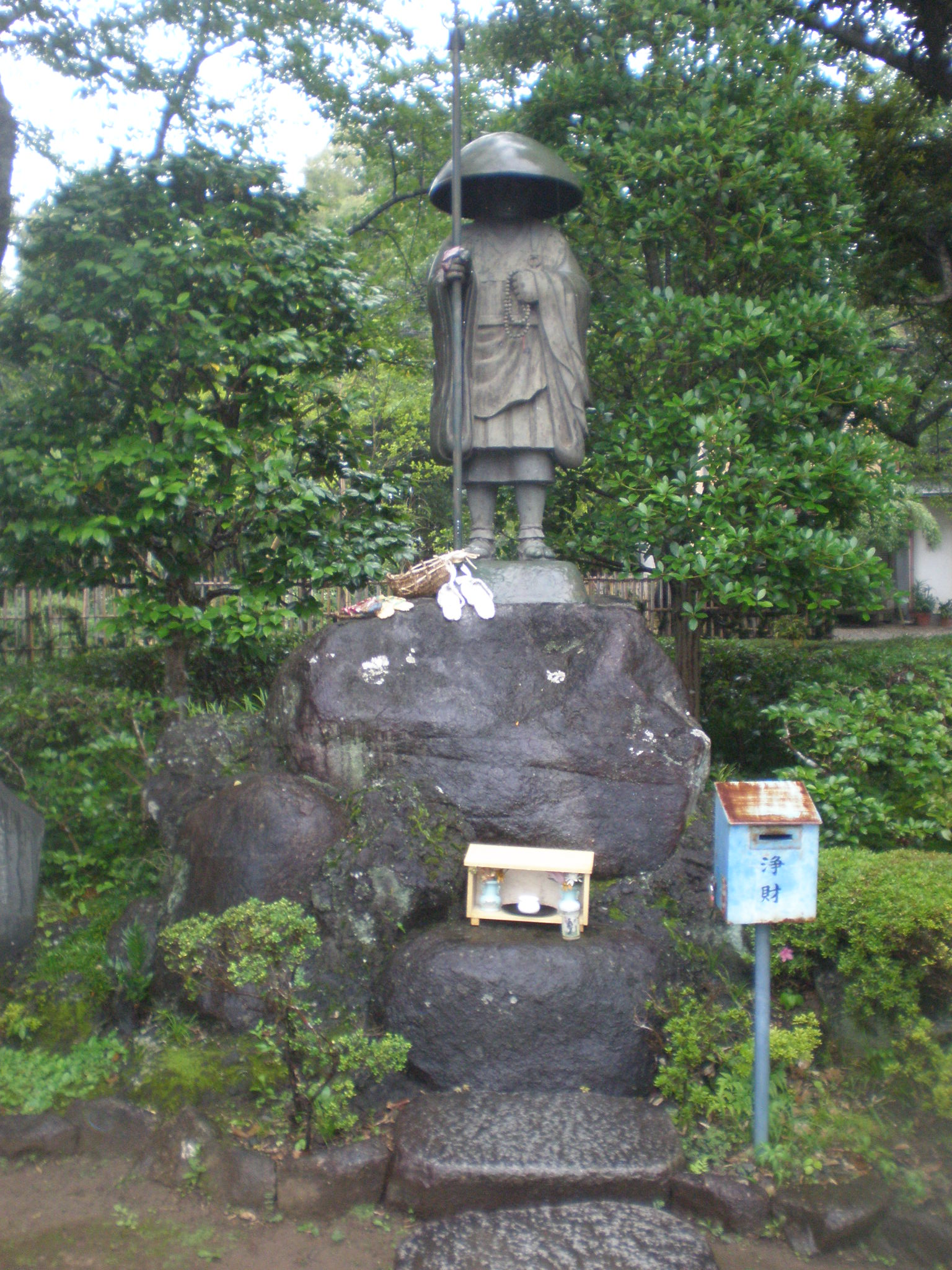
Statue of Kūkai

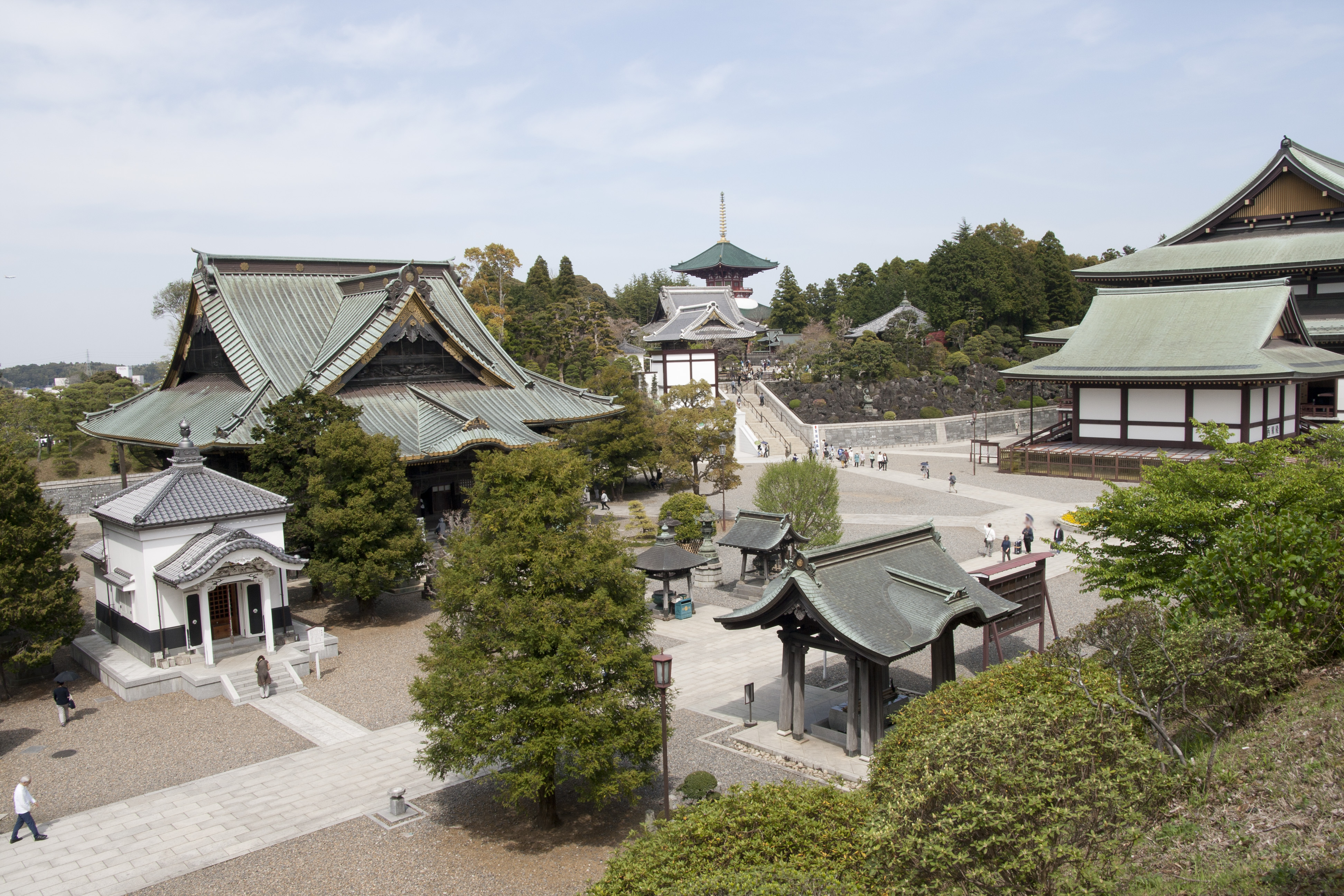
