= Kento Three Great Acalas =

The Kanto Three Great Acalas (関東三大不動) is a collective term, recorded in the Japanese history, for the three temples that are dedicated to the Acala ("Unmovable Wisdom King") in Kantō region governed by shōgun.

Narita-san Shinsho-ji Temple (成田山新勝寺) and Takahatafudotake Kongo Temple (高幡山金剛寺) had long been considered as two of the three Acala temples down the ages; however, there have been several versions of what the third temple is.

== Versions ==
Version 1

- Narita-san Shinsho-ji Temple (Narita Acala), Chiba Prefecture
- Takahatafudotake Kongo Temple, (Takahatafudo Acala), Tokyo, Hino
- Gyokusan Sougan Temple (玉嶹山總願寺) (Fudogaoka Acala, 不動ヶ岡不動尊), Saitama Prefecture

Version 2

- Narita-san Shinsho-ji Temple (Narita Acala), Chiba Prefecture
- Takahatafudotake Kongo Temple, (Takahatafudo Acala), Tokyo, Hino
- Aburisan Oyama Temple (雨降山大山寺) (Oyama Acala 大山不動尊), Kanagawa Prefecture

Version 3

- Narita-san Shinsho-ji Temple (Narita Acala), Chiba Prefecture
- Takahatafudotake Kongo Temple, (Takahatafudo Acala), Tokyo, Hino
- Takayama Fudoson Kokisan JorakuinTemple (高貴山常樂院) (Takayama Acala 高山不動尊), Saitama Prefecture

Version 4

- Narita-san Shinsho-ji Temple (Narita Acala), Chiba Prefecture
- Takahatafudotake Kongo Temple, (Takahatafudo Acala), Tokyo, Hino
- Daisyo Temple (Koshigaya city) (大聖寺 (越谷市)) (Osagami Acala, 大相模不動尊), Saitama Prefecture

== See also ==
- 関東三大一覧
