= Ichikawa Danjūrō VIII =

Japanese actor

Ichikawa Danjūrō VIII 八代目市川團十郎
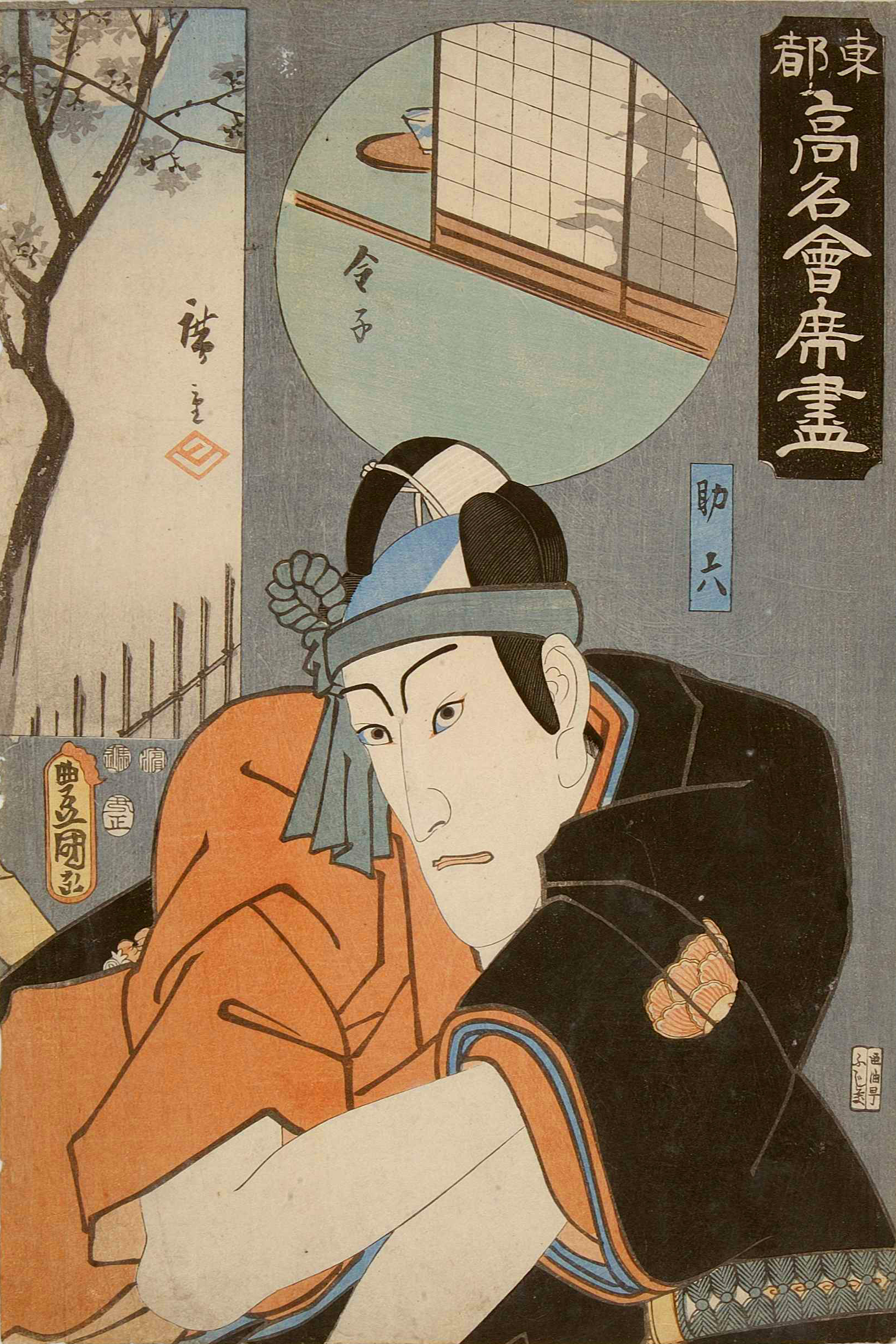
- Ichikawa Danjūrō VIII as Sukeroku in Sukeroku Yukari no Edo Zakura; 1853 woodblock print by Utagawa Kunisada
- Born: 7 November 1823; Edo, Japan
- Died: 27 September 1854 (aged 30); Osaka, Japan
- Other names: Ichikawa Ebizō VI, Ichikawa Shinnosuke II, Ichikawa Hakuen III, Sanshō
- Parent: Ichikawa Danjūrō VII

Ichikawa Danjūrō VIII (八代目 市川 團十郎, Hachidaime Ichikawa Danjūrō; 7 November 1823 – 27 September 1854) was a Japanese kabuki actor of the prestigious Ichikawa Danjūrō line. He was a tachiyaku (male roles) actor in the aragoto style, like all members of the lineage, but particularly specialized in the roles of young lovers, for which he was extremely popular. Danjūrō committed suicide in Osaka in 1854.

== Names ==
Like most kabuki actors, Danjūrō had a number of names over the course of his career. He was a member of the Naritaya guild, and could be called by this name (see yagō). He began his career as Ichikawa Shinnosuke II and soon afterwards took on the name Ichikawa Ebizō VI before becoming the eighth Ichikawa Danjūrō at the young age of nine. He also used the name Ichikawa Hakuen III at times; his haimyō, or poetry name, was Sanshō.

== Lineage ==
Unlike many kabuki actors who are adopted into the various theatre families, Danjūrō VIII was directly descended from Ichikawa Danjūrō I. Danjūrō VIII was the son of Ichikawa Danjūrō VII, and had a number of brothers who also performed on stage, including Ichikawa Danjūrō IX, Ichikawa Ebizō VII, Ichikawa Ebizō VIII, Ichikawa Komazō VI, Ichikawa Saruzō I, and Ichikawa Kōzō.

== Life and career ==
Born in Edo, he appeared on stage barely a month after being born, being introduced as Ichikawa Shinnosuke II at the Ichimura-za's kaomise performance, in which the troupe for the following year is introduced. He then took on the name Ichikawa Ebizō VI at the age of two, and becomes Danjūrō VIII in 1832, at the age of nine. This is the same age at which his father took on this prestigious name, the two receiving the name at a younger age than any other Danjūrō has ever done. Danjūrō VIII performed for the first time in Sukeroku Yukari no Edo Zakura at the shūmei naming ceremony, and in the lead role in Shibaraku later that year.

After appearing in a number of minor roles for the next several years, Danjūrō plays Minamoto no Yoshitsune in the 1840 premiere of Kanjinchō at the Kawarazaki-za. From then on, he played more prestigious roles, including Katō Masakiyo in Ehon Taikōki and the lead role in Narukami. In 1844, he played Sukeroku for the first time, alongside Iwai Hanshirō VII, Matsumoto Kōshirō VI and Onoe Kikugorō IV.

Danjūrō continued to be quite active for the next ten years, playing a number of major roles including Narukami and Katō Masakiyo again, Benkei in Kanjinchō, and the young lover Yosaburō in the new Kirare Yosa by Segawa Jōkō III. His popularity in these young lover roles (nimaime) are said to have been such that when he played Sukeroku, a role which involves immersing himself in a barrel of water in one scene, the water was sold afterwards to clamoring female fans.

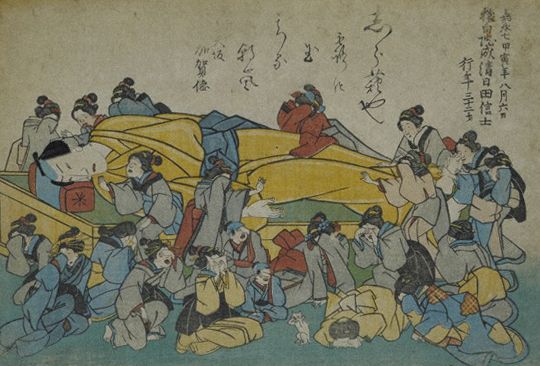
Death of Ichikawa Danjuro the VIII's and depiction of Nirvana

In 1854, however, shortly after arriving in Osaka for a performance tour with his father, Danjūrō was found in his room at the inn with his wrists slashed. Some scholars surmise that he suffered from extensive debts as a result of the extravagant lifestyle he and his father led, and that his early successes and popularity attracted the envy or ire of other actors, worsening his relationships with them and complicating his personal problems.

== See also ==
The Ichikawa family crest (mon)

- Shūmei

== See also ==
- Ichikawa Danjūrō
- Ichikawa Danjūrō I
- Ichikawa Ebizō XI
