= Ichikawa Danjūrō I =

Early Japanese kabuki actor

Ichikawa Danjūro I 初代市川団十郎
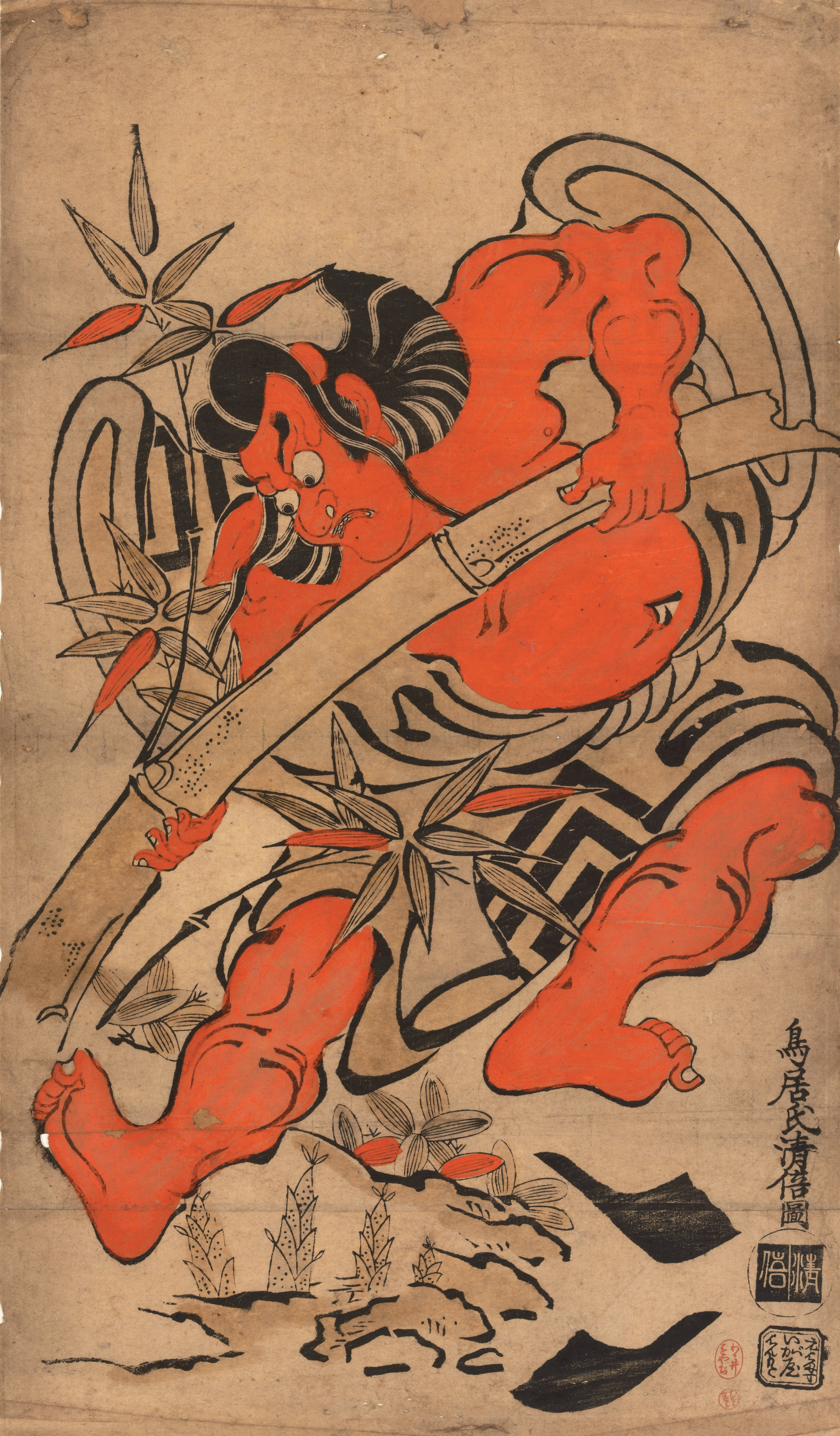
- Ichikawa Danjūrō I in the role of Soga Gorō, in a print by Torii Kiyomasu. This is likely one of the most famous early ukiyo-e actor prints.
- Born: 1660; Izumicho, Edo, Japan (Currently Izumicho, Chiyoda, Tokyo, Japan)
- Died: 24 March 1704; Edo, Japan
- Other names: Ichikawa Ebizō I, Saigyū, Mimasu Hyōgo, Naritaya

Ichikawa Danjūrō I (初代 市川 段十郎, Shodai Ichikawa Danjūrō; 1660–1704) was an early kabuki actor in Japan. He remains today one of the most famous of all kabuki actors and is considered one of the most influential. His many influences include the pioneering of the aragoto style of acting which came to be largely associated with Edo kabuki and with Danjūrō and his successors in the Ichikawa Danjūrō line.

Like many actors, Danjūrō also dabbled in playwriting, which he did under the haimyō (poetry name) Mimasuya Hyōgo. "Mimasu" (三升) is the name for the mon of the Ichikawa family; many actors in the Danjūrō line have since used "Mimasu" or "Sansho", an alternate reading of the same characters, as their haimyō.

== Lineage ==
There have been many descendants of Danjūrō I in the kabuki world. Danjūrō's father, Horikoshi Juzō, was not involved in the theatre, but was an otokodate, a man a part of Edo popular urban culture; though not in the theatre himself, he may have been a patron of various types of performances, as well as of the closely related sex industry.

The sons of Danjūrō I were known as Ichikawa Danjūrō II and Ichikawa Sen'ya. The fourth Danjūrō was his grandson; the fifth his great-grandson. His great-great-grandsons, as well as their sons and grandsons were kabuki actors of the Ichikawa family as well. Danjūrō I also had a great many disciples.

A devout follower of Fudō Myōō, one of Japan's Thirteen Buddhas, Danjūrō was the first to perform as Fudō onstage, and founded the actors' guild Naritaya, named after the Fudō temple Narita Fudōson.

== Life and career ==
Born in Japan's capital of Edo in 1660, he first performed at the age of 13 at the Nakamura-za, under the name Ichikawa Ebizō. The first to take the name Ebizō, he was thus the founder or originator of this prestigious actor lineage as well. This 1673 performance of Shitennō Ochigodachi, in which Ebizō played Sakata Kintoki marks not only his first performance, but also the first use of red and black striped makeup, now called kumadori, and thus the nascent origins of the aragoto style.

Two years later, taking the name Danjūrō, he performed in the first kabuki presentation based on the Tale of the Soga Brothers. The famous actor print seen here, though produced for a 1697 performance, depicts Danjūrō in the same role, that of Soga Gorō. Serving as playwright as well as actor, Danjūrō produced a number of works, several of which were early forms of plays extremely popular later in the Edo period and still performed today, though they have undergone great changes over the centuries. Two of these such plays are Narukami, written and premiered in 1684, and Shibaraku, in 1697.

The Genroku period marked the peak of Edo period extravagance and hedonism. Danjūrō was one of the most popular actors in Edo in this period, alongside Nakamura Shichisaburō I and Nakamura Denkurō I. The first aragoto performance in Kyoto was that of Genji Musha Homare no Seiriki in 1694; the following year, Danjūrō would be featured in the Edo hyōbanki, a popular publication ranking actors and performances, as jō-jō-kichi (上々吉, higher-higher-excellent) and his annual salary would reach 500 ryō.

Over the course of his career, Danjūrō performed in, and wrote, a great number of plays. Unlike many later actors, he was not particularly faithful to any one theater, and moved back and forth between them many times. He also performed alongside his son, Ichikawa Kuzō, who would later take his father's name and become Ichikawa Danjūrō II. Danjūrō is said to have also been the first kabuki actor to write haiku and to take a poetry name (haimyō).

While performing at the Ichimura-za on 24 March 1704, Danjūrō was stabbed and killed in his dressing room (some accounts say "on stage") by fellow actor Ikushima Hanroku, who was either subsequently executed for this crime or died in prison under police interrogation.

== See also ==
The Ichikawa family crest (mon)

- Shūmei
- Ichikawa Danjūrō – overview of name and succession
- Ichikawa Danjūrō XIII – current head of the line
- Ichikawa Danjūrō XII
- Ichikawa Ebizō XI
