= Aragoto =

Style of acting in kabuki theatre

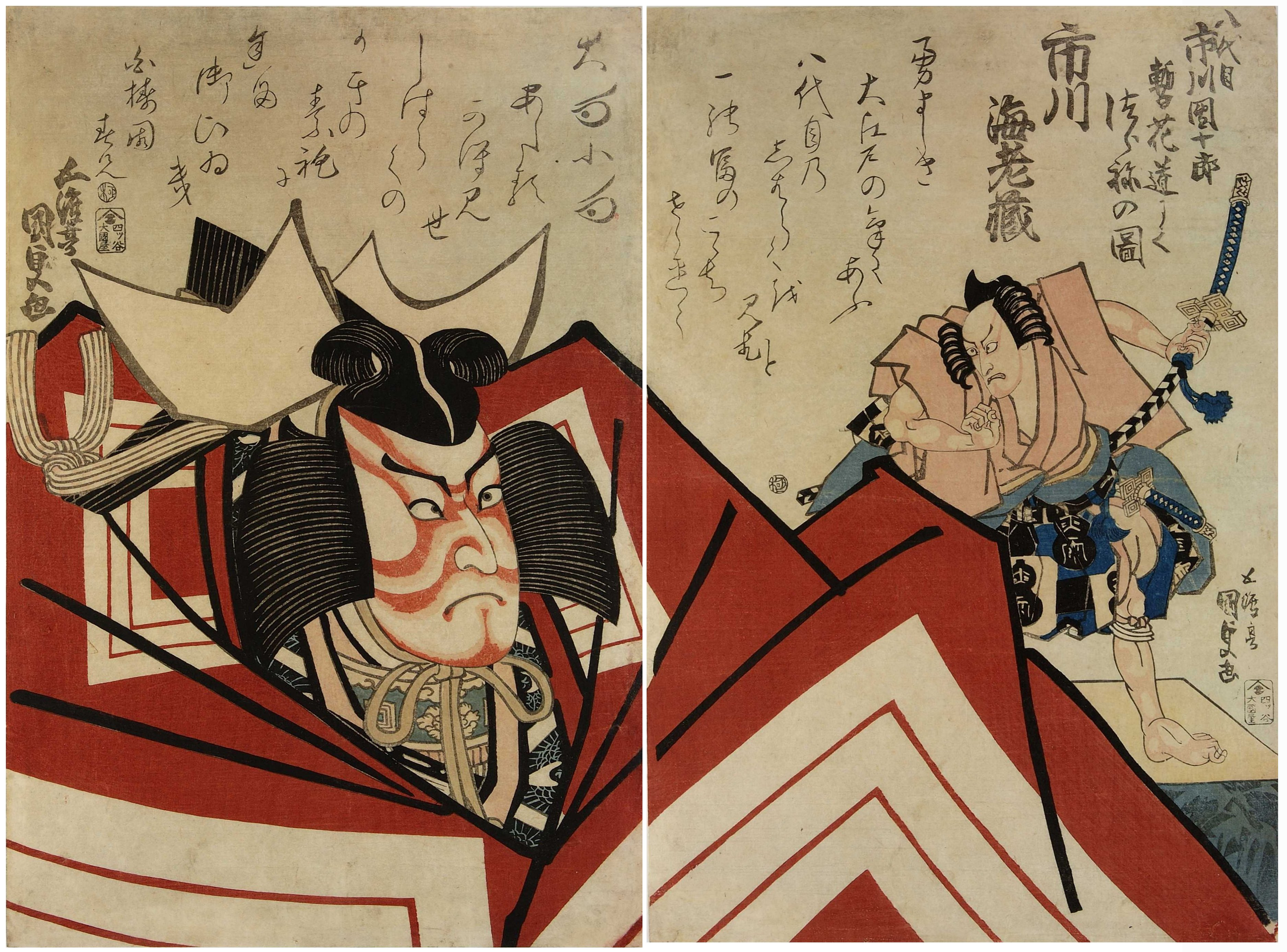
Ichikawa Danjūrō VIII in the lead role in Shibaraku, a role considered definitive of the aragoto style. Ukiyo-e print by Utagawa Kunisada.

Aragoto (荒事), or 'rough style', is a style of kabuki acting that uses exaggerated, dynamic kata (forms or movements) and speech. Aragoto roles are characterised by the bold red or blue makeup (kumadori) worn by actors, as well as their enlarged and padded costumes. The term "aragoto" is an abbreviation of the term "aramushagoto", which literally means "wild-warrior style".

The aragoto style was created and pioneered by Ichikawa Danjūrō I, a kabuki actor in the Edo period (1603-1867), and has come to be epitomized by his successors in the Ichikawa Danjūrō line of kabuki actors. Roles such as the leads in Sukeroku and Shibaraku are particularly representative of the style. Aragoto is often contrasted with the wagoto ("soft" or "gentle") style, which emerged around the same time but focuses on more naturalistic drama. It is also contrasted with onnagata or "female-like style".

== Notable Aragotoshi ==
- The Bandō Mitsugorō line
  - Bandō Mitsugorō VIII
  - Bandō Mitsugorō X
- The Ichikawa Danjūrō line
  - Ichikawa Danjūrō I
  - Ichikawa Danjūrō II
  - Ichikawa Danjūrō III
  - Ichikawa Danjūrō IV
  - Ichikawa Danjūrō V
  - Ichikawa Danjūrō VI
  - Ichikawa Danjūrō VII
  - Ichikawa Danjūrō VIII
  - Ichikawa Danjūrō IX
  - Ichikawa Danjūrō X (Sanshō Ichikawa V)
  - Ichikawa Danjūrō XI
  - Ichikawa Danjūrō XII
  - Ichikawa Danjūrō XIII
- Ichikawa Ennosuke III
- Kataoka Ainosuke VI
- The Matsumoto Kōshirō line
  - Matsumoto Hakuō I (Matsumoto Kōshirō VIII)
  - Matsumoto Hakuō II (Matsumoto Kōshirō IX)
  - Matsumoto Kōshirō VII
  - Matsumoto Kōshirō X
- Nakamura Kichiemon I
- Nakamura Kichiemon II
- Nakamura Shidō II
- The Onoe Shoroku line
  - Onoe Shoroku II
  - Onoe Shoroku IV
