= Ichikawa Ebizō =

Stage name for Japanese kabuki actors

The Ichikawa family crest (mon)

Ichikawa Ebizō (市川 海老蔵; Japanese pronunciation: [i.tɕi̥.kaꜜ.wa (|) e.bʲi.(d)zoꜜː]) is a stage name taken on by a series of Kabuki actors of the Ichikawa family. Most of these were blood relatives, though some were adopted into the family. It is a famous and important name, and receiving it is an honor.

Ebizō, like other actors' names, is bestowed (or given up) at grand naming ceremonies called shūmei in which a number of actors formally change their names. A number of actors have followed a particular sequence in their stage names, preceding "Ebizō" by being called Ichikawa Shinnosuke or Matsumoto Kōshirō, and following it by achieving the name Ichikawa Danjūrō.

The design of the Ichikawa family mon, three squares nested inside one another, is called mimasu (三升).

== Lineage ==
- Ichikawa Ebizō I (1673 – April 1675) – Took the name Danjūrō in 1693, becoming the first Ichikawa Danjūrō. Originated the aragoto form.
- Ichikawa Ebizō II (November 1735 – September 1758) – Eldest son of Ebizō I; previously known as Ichikawa Kuzō and later as Ichikawa Danjūrō II.
- Ichikawa Ebizō III (November 1772 – March 1778) – Adopted son of Ebizō II, possibly biological son. Previously known as Matsumoto Kōshirō II, and later as Ichikawa Danjūrō III.
- Ichikawa Ebizō IV (November 1782 – October 1791) – Son of Ichikawa Danjūrō V, grandson of Ebizō III; Later known as Ichikawa Danjūrō VI. Died young.
- Ichikawa Ebizō V (1797 – October 1800, March 1832 – March 1859) – Grandson of Danjūrō V, previously known as Ichikawa Shinnosuke I and Ichikawa Yebizō and Ichikawa Danjūrō VII. Established the Kabuki Jūhachiban.
- Ichikawa Ebizō VI (March 1825 to February 1832) – Eldest son of Ebizō V. Previously known as Ichikawa Shinnosuke II, later known as Danjūrō VIII. Committed suicide in Osaka.
- Ichikawa Ebizō VII (1874) – Third son of Ebizō V. Previously known as Ichikawa Shinnosuke III.
- Ichikawa Ebizō VIII (1881 – November 1886) – Seventh son of Ebizō V, brother to Ichikawa Danjūrō IX. Previously known as Ichikawa Akanbei, Ichikawa Juzō, Ichikawa Saruzō II, and Ichikawa Shinnosuke IV.
- Ichikawa Ebizō IX (May 1940 – March 1962) – Adopted son of Ichikawa Danjūrō X, his biological father was Matsumoto Kōshirō VII. Previously known as Ichikawa Komazō V and later as Ichikawa Danjūrō XI.
- Ichikawa Ebizō X (November 1969 to March 1985) – Eldest son of Ebizō IX. Previously known as Ichikawa Shinnosuke VI and later as Ichikawa Danjūrō XII. He was the latest holder of the name Ichikawa Danjūrō, until his death in February 2013.
- Ichikawa Ebizō XI (May 2004–October 2022) – Son of Ebizō X. Previously known as Ichikawa Shinnosuke VII. Succeeded his father in October 2022 as Ichikawa Danjūrō XIII.

== Notes ==
- Ichikawa Danjūrō V was forced to give up the name Danjūrō and take the name Ebizō due to an incident in 1778, in which he was accused of misappropriation of funds by actors who saw him as a rival for influence within the kabuki world. He took the name Ebizō again from November 1791 until November 1798, but wrote it with different kanji (鰕蔵) and thus he is not counted within the regular Ebizō (海老蔵) lineage.

== See also ==
- Ichikawa Danjūrō - related line of kabuki actors
- Two Actors in Samurai Roles (Gosotei Hirosada) - Print featuring Ichikawa Ebizō V
