= Ichikawa Danjūrō II =

Japanese kabuki performer (1688–1758)

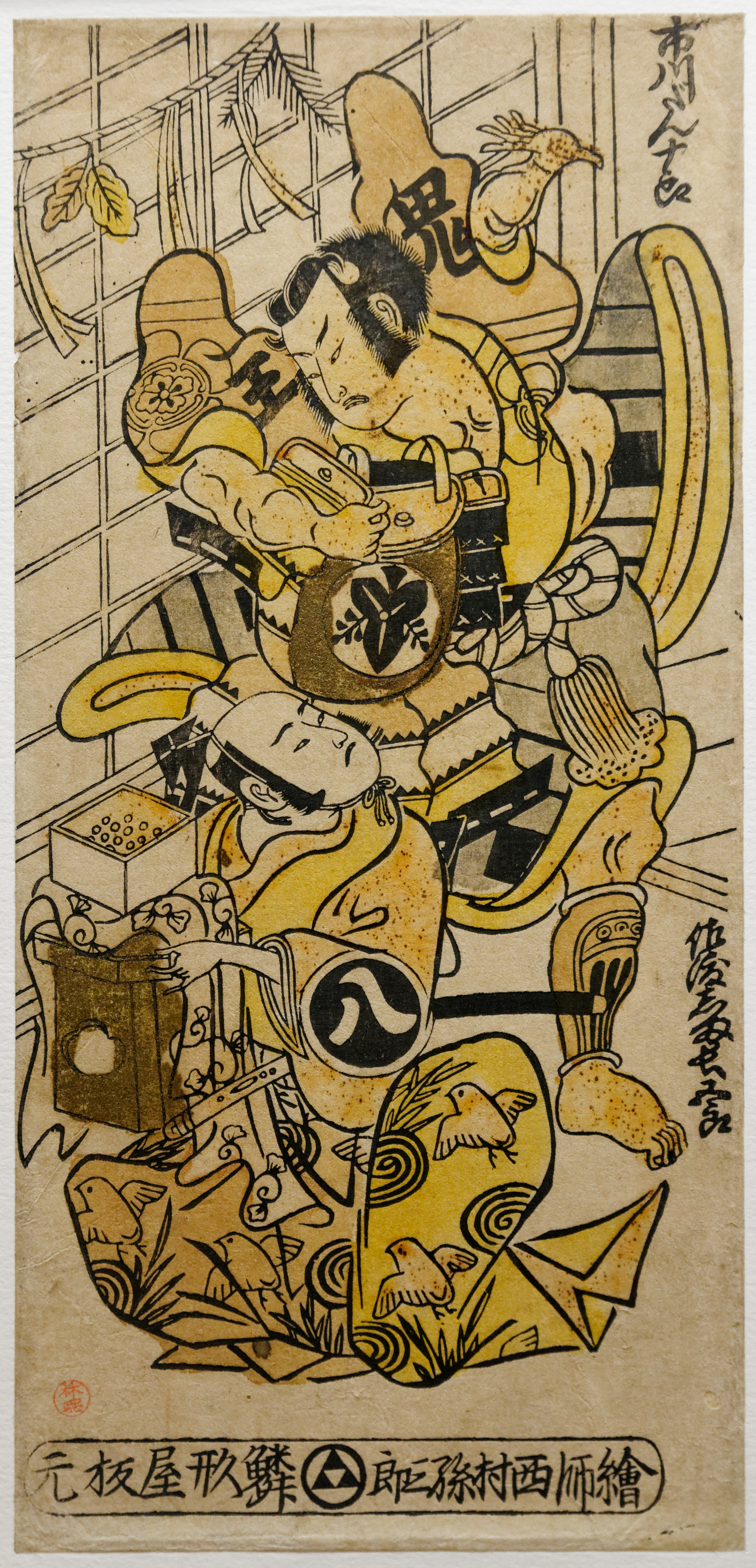
- Ichikawa Danjūrō II as Kio, and Sadojima Chojoro as Soga no Juro in a scene from the New Year's kabuki play, Hatsu-goyomi akinai Soga at Nakamura-za theatre.
- Born: 1688; Edo, Japan
- Died: 1758 (aged 69–70)
- Occupation: Kabuki performer
- Known for: Part of a celebrated family of actors from the Edo region

Ichikawa Danjūrō II (二代目 市川 團十郎, Nidaime Ichikawa Danjūrō; 1688–1758) was a Japanese kabuki performer in the lineage of a celebrated family of actors from the Edo region. Ichikawa Danjūrō is a stage name.

== Career ==
The earnestly prayed-for son of Ichikawa Danjūrō I, Danjūrō II acted under the name Ichikawa Kuzō I from 1697 to 1704, the year his father was killed in a backstage quarrel with another actor. Danjūrō II assumed his father's stage name five months after this incident and held it until 1735, when he took the name Ichikawa Ebizō II. Thereafter, the name was handed down in a direct line through the generations, e.g., Danjūrō III and Danjuro IV were the adopted sons of Danjūrō II; Danjūrō VI was the adopted son of Danjūrō V, and Danjūrō VII was the adopted son of Danjūrō VI.

In the conservative Kabuki world, stage names are conveyed in formal system which converts the kabuki stage name into a mark of accomplishment. In 1840, Danjūrō IV created Kabuki Jūhachiban to remind the theater world of his family's pre-eminence in Kabuki, especially in the creation and development of aragoto roles. This collection of 18 plays is a compilation of his and his predecessors representative roles. The work features the character Benkei, who was played by Danjūrō I and Danjūrō II. This is the ie no gei (family art) of the Danjuro line.

== Lineage of Danjūrō stage names ==
- Ichikawa Danjūrō I (1660–1704)
- Ichikawa Danjūrō II (1688–1758)
- Ichikawa Danjūrō III (18th century)
- Ichikawa Danjūrō IV (1711–1778)
- Ichikawa Danjūrō V (1741–1806)
- Ichikawa Danjūrō VI (18th–19th century)
- Ichikawa Danjūrō VII (1791–1859)
- Ichikawa Danjūrō VIII (1822–1854)
- Ichikawa Danjūrō IX (1838–1903)
- Ichikawa Danjūrō X (19th century)
- Ichikawa Danjūrō XI (1909–1965)
- Ichikawa Danjūrō XII (1946–2013)

== See also ==
The Ichikawa family crest (mon)

- Shūmei
