= Ichikawa Danjūrō =

Stage name of Kabuki actors

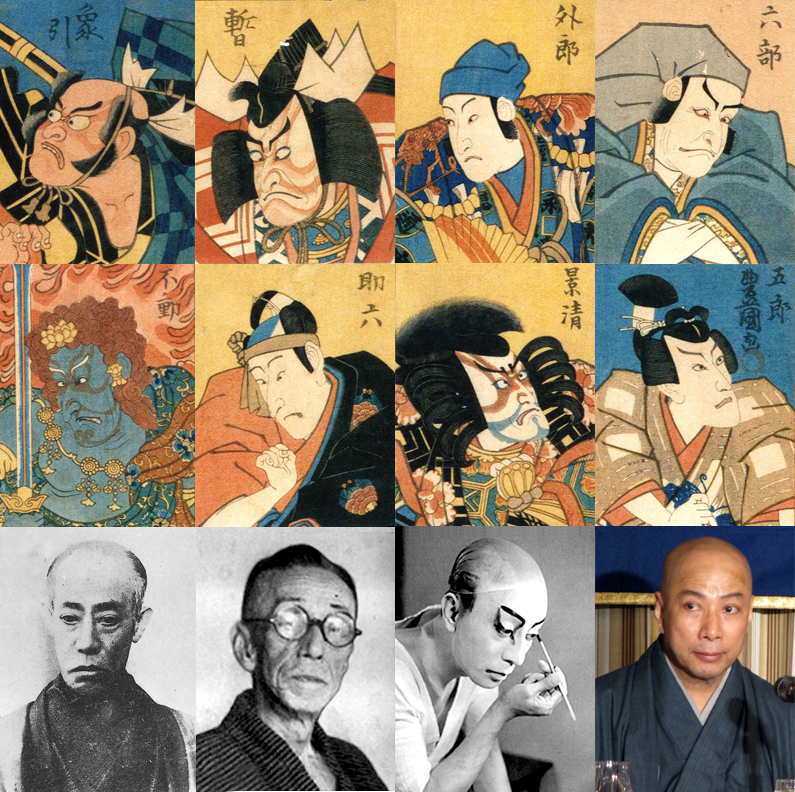
Top row, from left: Ichikawa Danjūrō I as Yamagami Gennaizaemon (Zōhiki) Ichikawa Danjūrō II as Kamakura Gongorō Kagemasa (Shibaraku) Ichikawa Danjūrō III as Uirō-uri or Soga no Gorō (Uirō) Ichikawa Danjūrō IV as Roku-bu (Kamahige) Second Row, from left: Ichikawa Danjūrō V as Fudō-myō-ō (Fudō) Ichikawa Danjūrō VI as Hanatogawa Sukeroku (Sukeroku) Ichikawa Danjūrō VII as Taira no Kagekiyo (Kagekiyo) Ichikawa Danjūrō VIII as Soga no Gorō in Ya no Ne Third Row, from left: Ichikawa Danjūrō IX Sanshō Ichikawa V (Danjūrō X) Ichikawa Danjūrō XI Ichikawa Danjūrō XII

Ichikawa Danjūrō (市川 團十郎) is a stage name taken on by a series of Kabuki actors of the Ichikawa family. Most of these were blood relatives, though some were adopted into the family. It is a famous and important name, and receiving it is an honor. There are a number of roles that the line of Danjūrō specialize in, as well as a series of plays, the Kabuki Jūhachiban (The Kabuki Eighteen), which showcase the specialties of the Ichikawa family.

Danjūrō, like other actors' names, is bestowed (or given up) at grand naming ceremonies called shūmei in which a number of actors formally change their names. The name Danjūrō is generally taken at the peak of an actor's career; another name may be taken after retirement. Prior to taking the name Danjūrō, an actor frequently had the names Matsumoto Kōshirō, Ichikawa Shinnosuke, or Ichikawa Ebizō.

The design of the Ichikawa family mon, three squares nested inside one another, is called mimasu or sanshō (三升). Some of the actors in this line used "Sanshō" as their haimyō, a nickname or alias used in poetry circles.

== Lineage ==
- Ichikawa Danjūrō I (May 1675 – February 1704) – also known as Mimasuya Hyōgo (三升屋 兵庫) as a playwright; known as Ichikawa Ebizō I prior to taking the name Danjūrō. Originated the aragoto form.
- Ichikawa Danjūrō II (July 1704 – November 1735) – Eldest son of Danjūrō I; previously known as Ichikawa Ebizō II and Ichikawa Kuzō.
- Ichikawa Danjūrō III (November 1735 – February 1742) – Adopted son of Danjūrō II, previously known as Ichikawa Masugorō; died young.
- Ichikawa Danjūrō IV (November 1754 – October 1770) – Adopted son of Danjūrō II, possibly biological son. Previously known as Matsumoto Kōshirō II and Ichikawa Ebizō III.
- Ichikawa Danjūrō V (November 1770 – October 1791) – Son of Danjūrō IV. Previously known as Matsumoto Kōshirō III and Ichikawa Ebizō. One of the most famous of all kabuki actors.
- Ichikawa Danjūrō VI (November 1791 – May 1799) – Son of Danjūrō V, previously known as Ichikawa Ebizō VI. Died young.
- Ichikawa Danjūrō VII (November 1800 – February 1832) – Grandson of Danjūrō V, previously known as Ichikawa Shinnosuke I, Ichikawa Yebizō, and later as Ichikawa Ebizō V. Established the Kabuki Jūhachiban.
- Ichikawa Danjūrō VIII (March 1832 – August 1854) – Eldest son of Danjūrō VII, previously known as Ichikawa Shinnosuke II and Ichikawa Ebizō VI. Committed suicide in Osaka.
- Ichikawa Danjūrō IX (1874 – September 1903) – Fifth son of Danjūrō VII. Previously known as Kawarazaki Chōjūrō III, Kawarazaki Gonjūrō I, Kawarazaki Gonnosuke VII and Kawarazaki Sanshō. Star of the Meiji period's golden age of Kabuki.
- Ichikawa Danjūrō X (posthumous 1962) – Son-in-law of Danjūrō IX; previously known as Horikoshi Fukusaburō and Ichikawa Sanshō V. Played only minor roles, but revived many plays of the Kabuki Jūhachiban.
- Ichikawa Danjūrō XI (April 1962 – November 1965) – Adopted son of Danjūrō X, his biological father was Matsumoto Kōshirō VII. Previously known as Ichikawa Komazō V and Ichikawa Ebizō IX.
- Ichikawa Danjūrō XII (April 1985 – February 2013) – Eldest son of Danjūrō XI. Previously known as Ichikawa Shinnosuke VI and Ichikawa Ebizō X.
- Ichikawa Danjūrō XIII (October 2022 – current) – Takatoshi Horikoshi, son of Danjūrō XII. Previously known as Ebizō XI. He planned to take the name of Danjūrō XIII in May 2020, but the name change was postponed when Kabuki shows were cancelled as a result of the COVID-19 pandemic.

== See also ==
The Ichikawa family crest (mon)

- Shūmei
- Ichikawa Ebizō- related line of kabuki actors
