= Ichikawa Danjūrō VII =

Japanese kabuki actor

Ichikawa Danjūrō VII 七代目市川團十郎
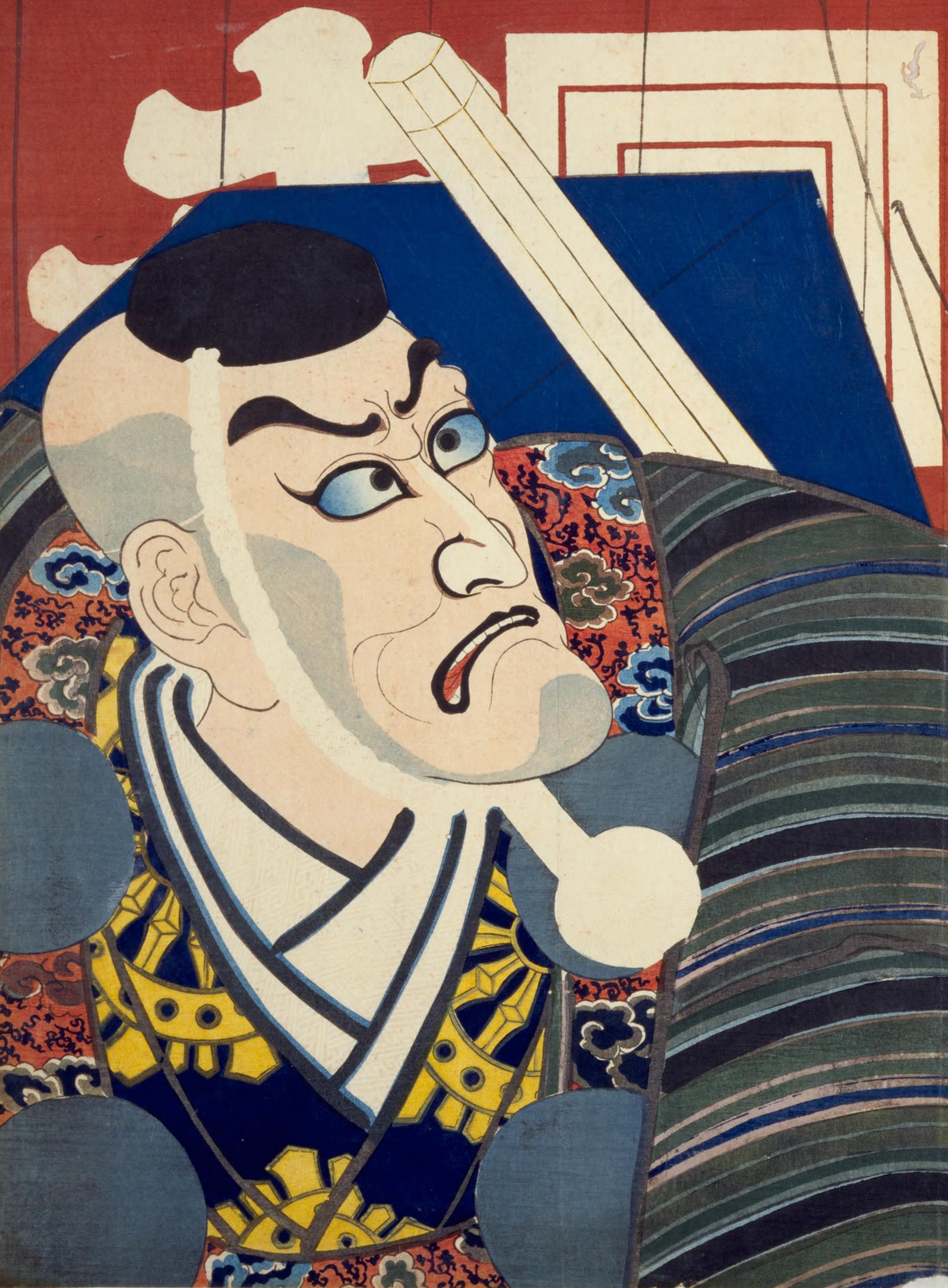
- Danjūrō VII as the Benkei in the 1830 production of Kanjinchō
- Born: 1791; Edo, Japan
- Died: 23 March 1859 (aged 67–68); Edo, Japan
- Other names: Ichikawa Hakuen II, Ichikawa Ebizō V, Ichikawa Shinnosuke I

Ichikawa Danjūrō VII (七代目 市川 團十郎, Shichidaime Ichikawa Danjūrō; 1791 – 23 March 1859) was a Japanese kabuki actor who specialized in male hero (tachiyaku) roles, said to be the greatest of the 19th century. He was responsible for the establishment of the Kabuki Jūhachiban, a collection of the eighteen greatest plays in the repertoire.

== Names ==
Like most kabuki actors, and many artists, of his time, Danjūrō VII had a number of names, including Ichikawa Ebizō V, Ichikawa Hakuen II and Ichikawa Shinnosuke I. In poetry circles, he often used the names Jukai (I), Sanshō, and Hakuen. Ebizō was also referred to in various circumstances as Ichikawa Jukai I, Matsumoto Kōshirō, Hatagaya Jūzō and Naritaya Shichizaemon II, though he did not formally use these names onstage. He was a member of the guild Naritaya, and could be referred to by this name (see yagō).

== Lineage ==
The son of Ichikawa Danjūrō V's daughter, he was formally adopted into the kabuki lineages by Ichikawa Danjūrō VI. Through these connections, he could trace his lineage back to the first Danjūrō.

Danjūrō VII had a number of sons who became actors, under the names Ichikawa Danjūrō VIII, Ichikawa Danjūrō IX, Ichikawa Ebizō VII, Ichikawa Ebizō VIII, Ichikawa Komazō VI, Ichikawa Saruzō I, and Ichikawa Kōzō. He also had a great many disciples.

== Life and career ==
He was born in Edo in 1791, to the daughter of the famous Ichikawa Danjūrō V; his father owned a shibai jaya (a teashop inside the theatre), and is said to have been a musician and low-ranking samurai. He appeared onstage for the first time at the age of 3, as Ichikawa Shinnosuke, and took the name Ebizō V at the age of six.

The following year, he played the famous child roles of Emperor Antoku and Rokudai in Yoshitsune Senbon Zakura at the Nakamura-za, where he had made his premiere. His adopted father died in 1799, and Ebizō was officially designated to become the next Danjūrō, one of the greatest honors an actor could receive. After his grandfather died in 1806, Ebizō became Danjūrō VII the following year.

In the early 1810s, Danjūrō performed at the Ichimura-za in a number of new plays by the great playwright Tsuruya Nanboku IV, and played the titular role of Sukeroku in Sukeroku Yukari no Edo Zakura for the first time in 1811, alongside Iwai Hanshirō V and Matsumoto Kōshirō V. Upon its reopening in 1815, he moved to the Kawarazaki-za, along with Hanshirō, Kōshirō, and Seki Sanjūrō II. He performed primarily there, and at the Ichimura-za, for the next several decades, until 1840. Hanshirō, Kōshirō, and the famous onnagata Segawa Kikunojō V remained his chief partners onstage throughout this period.

Danjūrō retook the name Ebizō at a grand shūmei naming ceremony in 1832, passing on the name to his nine-year-old son, who now became Ichikawa Danjūrō VIII. He played the role of Benkei in the 1840 premiere of Kanjinchō at the Kawarazaki-za. Two years later, he was arrested for violating the sumptuary regulations, and banished from Edo, his home destroyed.

Ebizō then performed in Kyoto and Osaka for the next eight years or so, alongside the likes of Ichikawa Kōdanji IV and Arashi Rikan III. After returning to Edo and to the Kawarazaki-za in 1850, Ebizō went on tour to Kamigata again in 1854, performing in Nagoya, Kyoto, and Osaka. That same year, upon Ebizō's arrival in Osaka, his son Danjūrō VIII committed suicide in the inn they were staying at.

Ebizō remained in the Kamigata area for several years, and then returned to Edo once more. At a performance at the Nakamura-za in January 1859, he began to feel ill, and left the stage for several weeks. That March, he was scheduled to perform as Soga no Iruka in Imoseyama Onna Teikin, but fell ill once more and died on the 23rd.

Close friend of Kunisada, the most popular ukiyo-e artist of those times, Ichikawa Ebizo is portrayed on hundreds of kabuki prints.

== See also ==
The Ichikawa family crest (mon)

- Shūmei
