= Ichikawa Danjūrō XII =

Kabuki actor

Ichikawa Danjūrō XII 十二代目 市川 團十郎
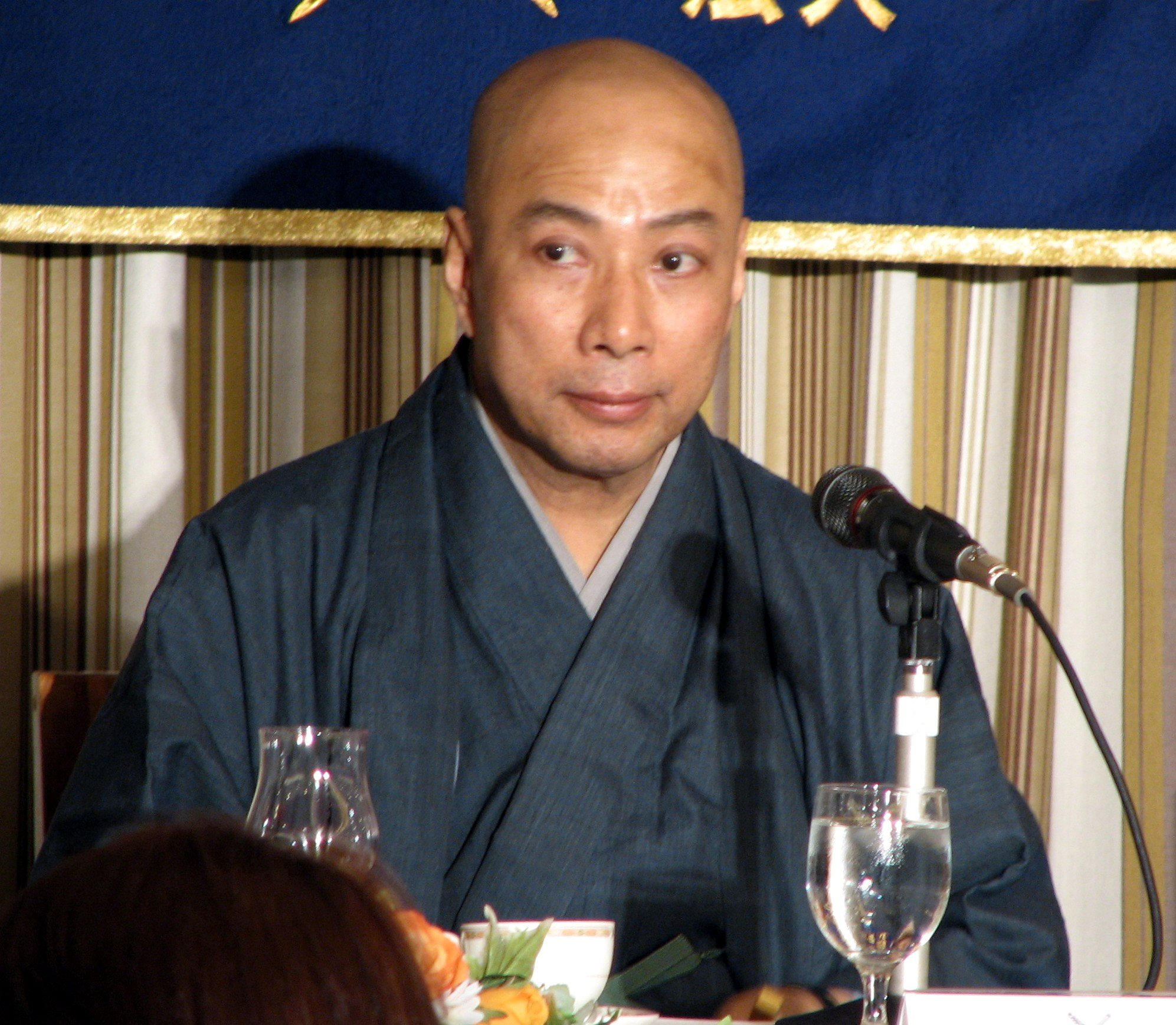
- Born: Natsuo Horikoshi; August 6, 1946; Tokyo, Japan
- Died: February 3, 2013 (aged 66); Tokyo, Japan
- Other names: Ichikawa Ebizō X, Ichikawa Shinnosuke VI, Ichikawa Natsuo, Narita-ya
- Spouse: Kimiko Horikoshi (m. 1976–2013)
- Children: Ichikawa Danjūrō XIII (eldest son); Ichikawa Suisen IV (younger daughter)
- Parent(s): Ichikawa Danjūrō XI (father); Chiyo Horikoshi (mother)
- Relatives: Matsumoto Kōshirō VII (grandfather); Matsumoto Hakuō I (uncle); Onoe Shoroku II (uncle); Ichikawa Kōbai II (younger sister); Takao Shoji (father-in-law)

Ichikawa Danjūrō XII (十二代目 市川 團十郎, Jūnidaime Ichikawa Danjūrō; August 6, 1946 – February 3, 2013) was a Japanese actor. He was the twelfth kabuki actor to hold the illustrious name Ichikawa Danjūrō.

== Career ==
He was the eldest son of Ichikawa Danjūrō XI. He first appeared on stage in 1953 under his birth name Natsuo Horikoshi, and in 1958 took the name Ichikawa Shinnosuke. In 1969, he graduated from Nihon University, and took the name Ichikawa Ebizō X, acting in major roles such as the title character in Sukeroku and Togashi in Kanjinchō. He assumed his present name in 1985, appearing as Benkei (again in Kanjinchō). Though he underwent the formal shūmei naming ceremony at the Kabuki-za in Tokyo, the celebrations continued for several months, as is traditional; his performances that year in New York, Washington DC and Los Angeles would mark the first (and as of 2006, only) time that a shūmei was celebrated abroad.

Active outside Japan, Danjūrō appeared in New York, Washington, Los Angeles, Brisbane, Melbourne, Perth, Brussels, East Berlin, Dresden, Vienna, and Paris.

In addition, he acted in television roles, and has portrayed Ōoka Tadasuke in Honō no Bugyō Ōoka Echizen no Kami, as well as Tokugawa Mitsukuni and Ashikaga Yoshimasa.

Danjūrō was diagnosed with acute promyelocytic leukemia in late spring 2004, after falling ill and becoming unable to perform alongside his son (Ichikawa Ebizō XI), who was celebrating his shūmei at the time, having become the latest to take the name Ichikawa Ebizō. Though illness, and subsequent hospitalization, forced Danjūrō to leave the stage for long stretches in 2004–05, he later returned.

He died of pneumonia in a Tokyo hospital on February 3, 2013, at the age of 66.

== See also ==
The Ichikawa family crest (mon)

- Shūmei
- Ichikawa Danjūrō – overview of the succession of kabuki actors to hold this name

== Sources ==
- Ichikawa Danjūrō XII at Kabuki21.com
