= Shūmei =

Naming ceremonies held in kabuki theatre

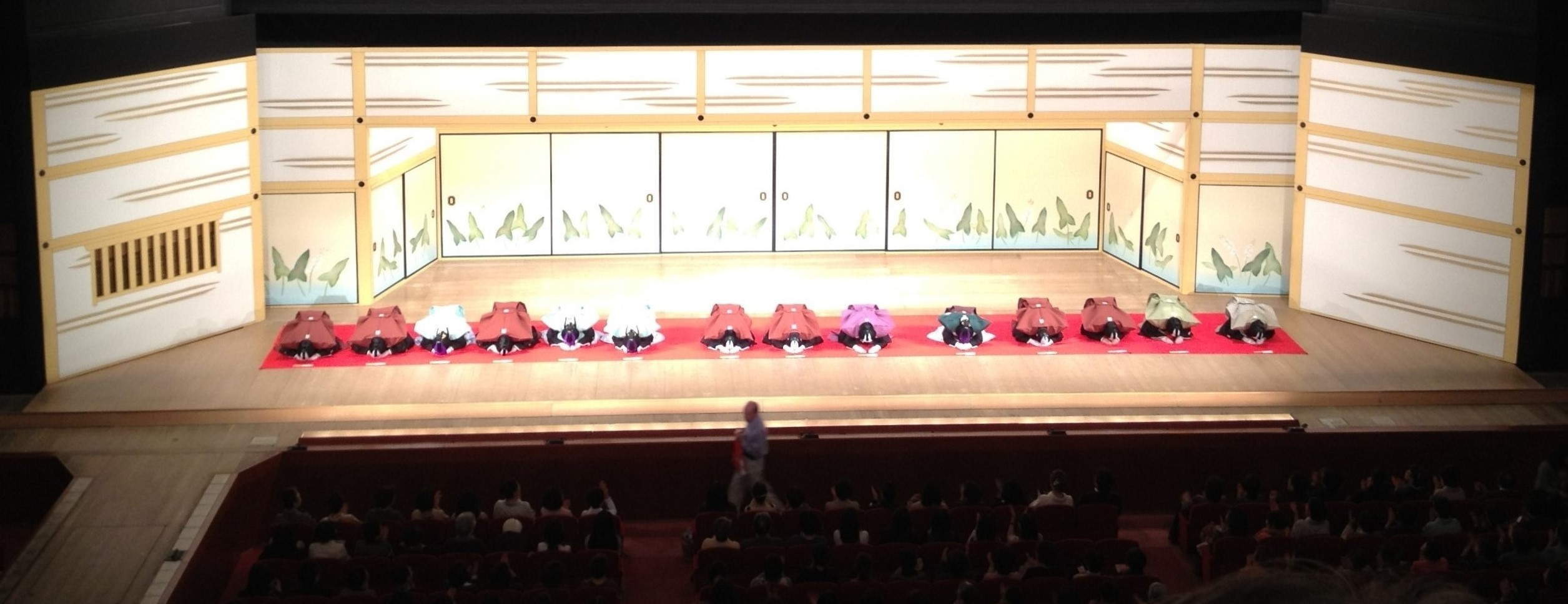
Shūmei ceremony (襲名) of Ichikawa En'ō II, Ichikawa Ennosuke IV and Ichikawa Chūsha IX at the Misono-za in Nagoya (March 2013)

Shūmei (襲名, "name succession") are grand naming ceremonies held in kabuki theatre. Most often, a number of actors will participate in a single ceremony, taking on new stage names.

These stage names, most often those of the actor's father, grandfather, or teacher, are passed down between generations of actors' lineages, and hold great honor and importance. Many names are associated with certain roles or acting styles, and the new possessor of each name must live up to these expectations; there is the feeling almost of the actor not only taking a name, but embodying the spirit, style, or skill of each actor who previously had that name. Many actors will go through at least three names over the course of their career, their participation in a shūmei representing their passage into a new chapter of their performing career.

The shūmei usually is followed by a performance significant to the actors' new names; these might involve larger parts, a new play, or roles traditional for actors with those names. For example, the stage name of Ichikawa Danjūrō is strongly associated with the role of the hero in the Shibaraku scene. Many of the thirteen men to be called Ichikawa Danjūrō excelled at this role, and so upon becoming the next Ichikawa Danjūrō, an actor may perform that role, which he never would have as a younger, less experienced actor with a different stage name.

== See also ==
- Kabuki actor name lines, such as
  - Ichikawa Danjūrō
  - Ichikawa Ebizō
  - Matsumoto Kōshirō
  - Nakamura Kanzaburō
