= Bandō =

Bandō may refer to:

== People ==
- Eiji Bandō, Japanese entertainer/sportsman
- Naoki Bandō, Japanese voice actor
- Yuta Bando (坂東 悠汰, born 1996), Japanese long-distance runner
- Yuta Bandoh (坂東 祐大, born 1991), Japanese composer
- Japanese surname, especially among Kabuki actors, such as:
  - Bandō Kakitsu I (1847–1893), Japanese kabuki actor of the Uzaemon acting lineage
  - Bandō Shūka I
  - Bandō Tamasaburō
  - Bandō Tamasaburō V
  - Bandō Mitsugorō III
  - Bandō Mitsugorō VIII
  - Bandō Mitsugorō X

== Other ==
- An alternate name for Kantō region
- Bandō, Ibaraki, a city
- Bandō Prisoner of War camp
- Bandō Station, a train station in Naruto, Tokushima Prefecture, Japan

== See also ==
- Bando (disambiguation)
