= Bandō Tamasaburō =

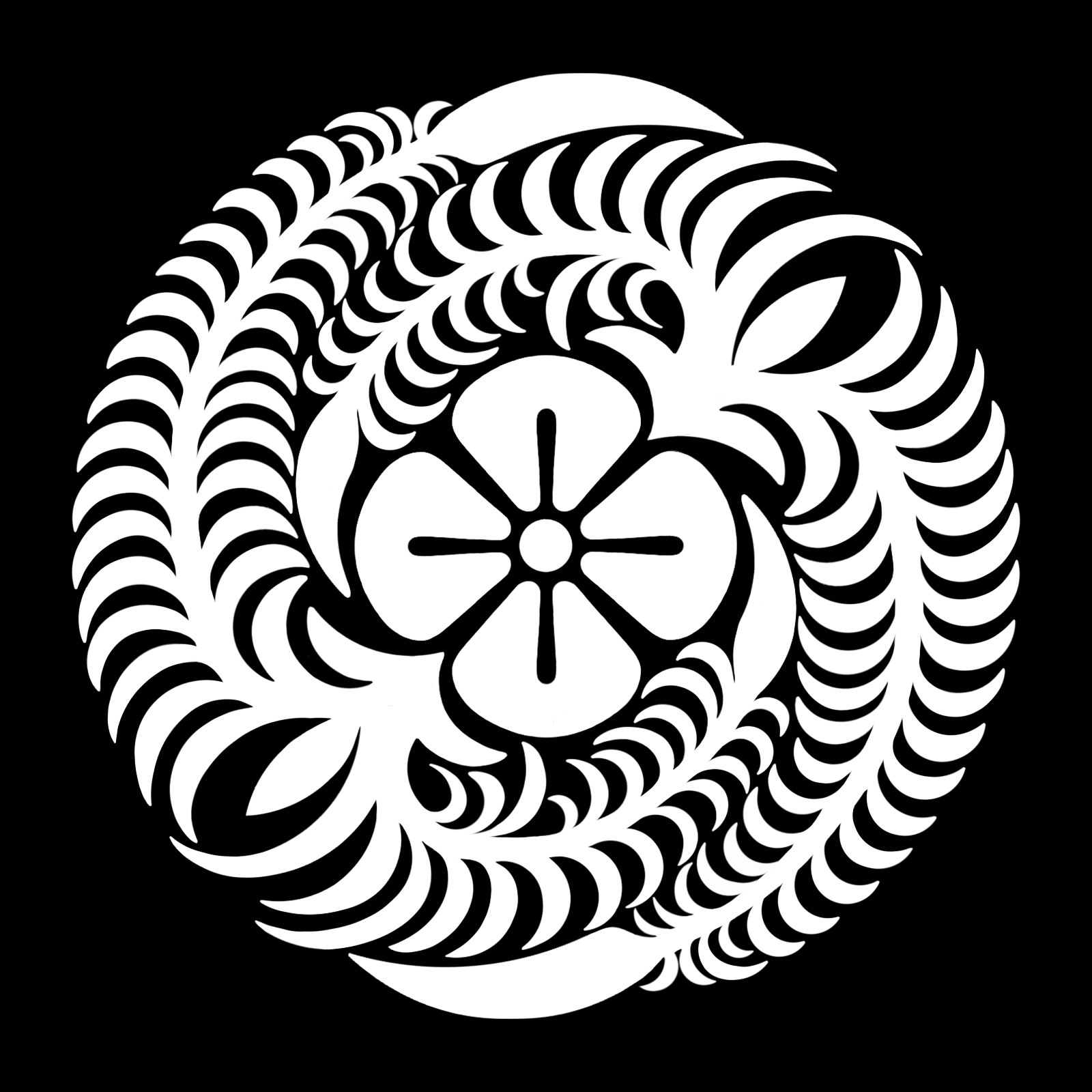
Hanakatsumi

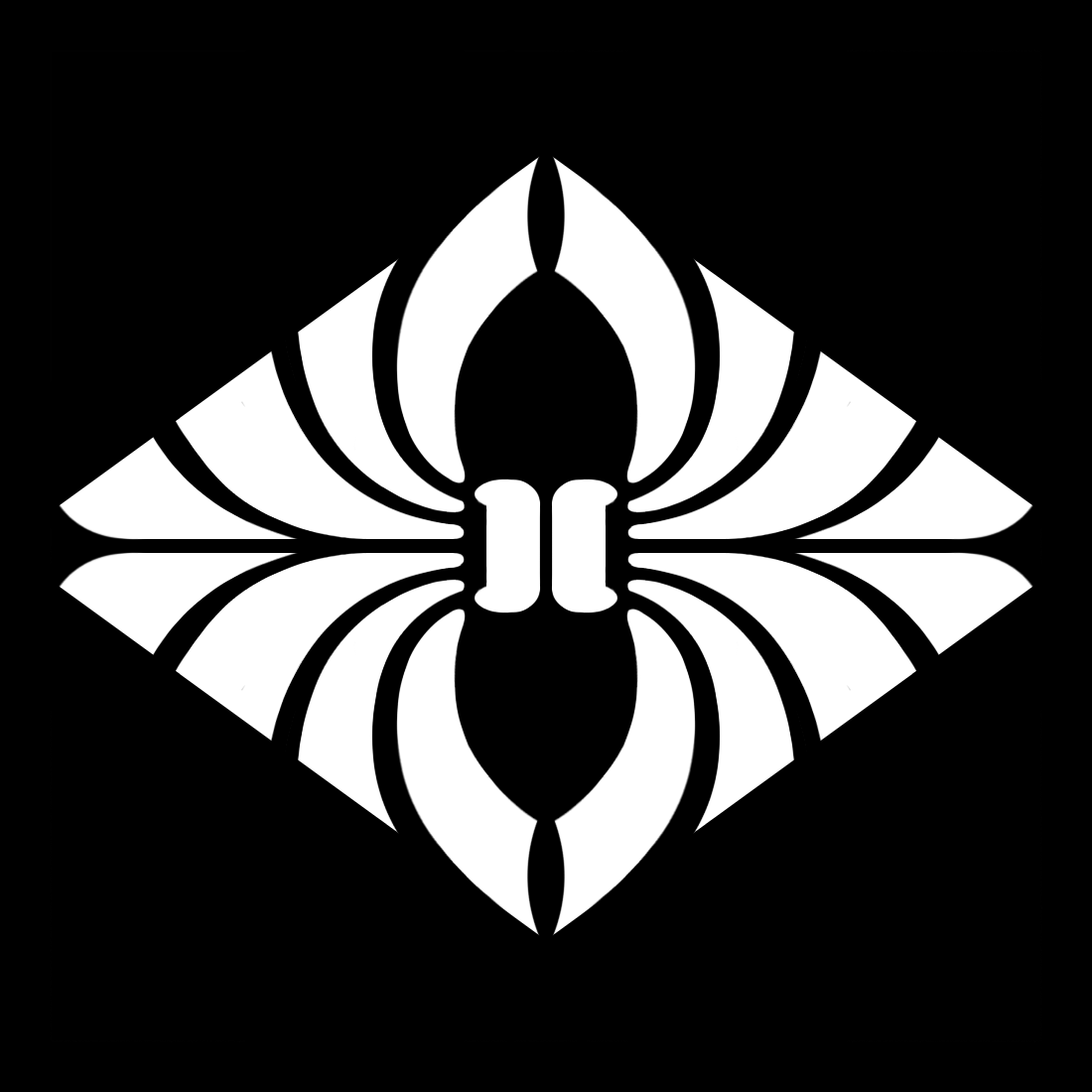
Noshibishi

Bandō Tamasaburō (坂東 玉三郎) is a stage name taken on by a series of kabuki actors of the Bandō family. Of the five who have held this name, most were adopted into the lineage. Many members of the Bandō family were also adopted or blood members of the Morita family, who established and ran the Morita-za theatre in Edo.

Tamasaburō, like other actors' names, is bestowed (or given up) at grand naming ceremonies known as shūmei, in which a number of actors formally change their names. The name Tamasaburō is generally taken early in an actor's career; another name is taken afterwards.

== Lineage ==
- Bandō Tamasaburō I (November 1824 - October 1839): (Note: The dates given here do not represent the birth/death dates of the actor; rather, they indicate the period during which the actor held the name Tamasaburō.) the adopted son of Bandō Mitsugorō III, Tamasaburō I took this name upon his first stage appearance.
- Bandō Tamasaburō II (November 1844 - January 1869): the adopted son of Tamasaburō I.
- Bandō Tamasaburō III (March 1889 - 1904): the daughter of Morita Kan'ya XII, Tamasaburō III joined an all-female kabuki troupe, which ultimately failed, before moving to New York City.
- Bandō Tamasaburō IV (July 1914 – December 1975): the grandson of Morita Kan'ya XII and the adopted son of Kan'ya XIII.
- Bandō Tamasaburō V (June 1964 – present): the adopted son of Tamasaburō IV, Tamasaburō V is currently the most popular onnagata actor in kabuki.
