= Mie (pose) =

Pose in Kabuki theatre

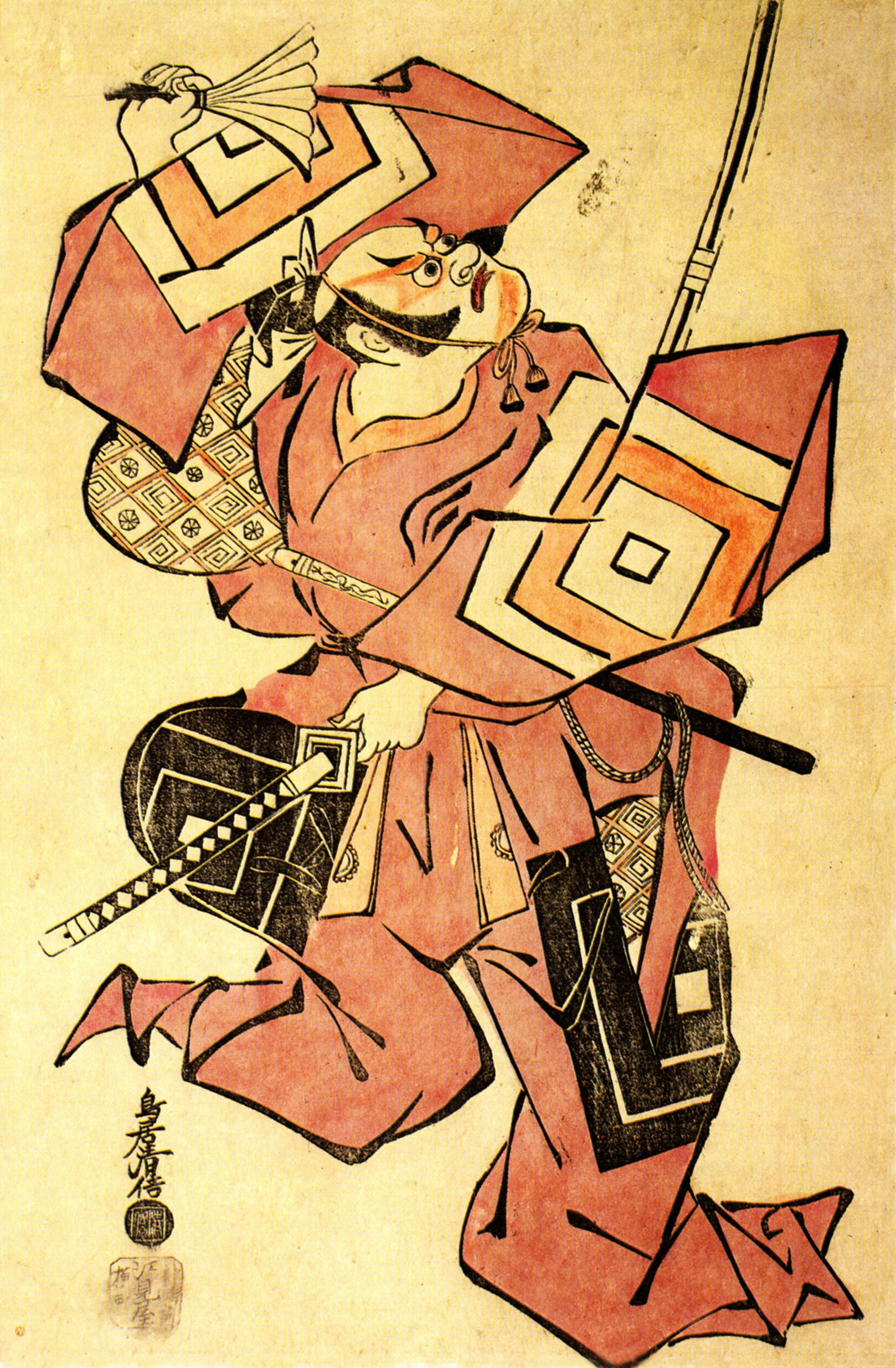
Ichikawa Danjūrō II, cutting a mie in Shibaraku. Woodblock print by Torii Kiyomasu

The mie (見え or 見得, Japanese pronunciation: [mi.eꜜ]), a powerful and emotional pose struck by an actor, who then freezes for a moment, is a distinctive element of aragoto Kabuki performance. Mie means 'appearance' or 'visible' in Japanese, and one of the primary purposes of this convention is to draw attention to a particularly important or powerful portion of the performance. It is meant to show a character's emotions at their peak, and can often be a very powerful pose. The actor's eyes are opened as wide as possible; if the character is meant to seem agitated or angry, the actor will cross his eyes. In Japanese, the mie pose is said to be "cut" by the actor (見得を切る, mie wo kiru). Audience members will shout out (kakegoe) words of praise and the actor's name at specific times before and after the pose is cut.

The practice of mie is said to have originated with Ichikawa Danjūrō I in the Genroku era, along with the aragoto style itself. There are a great many mie, each of which has a name describing it, and many of which are associated with particular lines of actors.

In the Genroku mie, one of the most famous or well-known, the actor's right hand is held flat, perpendicular to the ground, while his left hand is pointed upwards, elbow bent. At the same time, the actor stamps the floor powerfully with his left foot. This mie is most strongly associated with the character Kamakura Gongorō Kagemasa, the hero of the play Shibaraku, and is said to have been invented by Ichikawa Danjūrō I.

Two mie cut by the priest Narukami, in Narukami Fudō Kitayama Zakura, are the "post-wrapping pose" (柱巻きの見得, Hashimaki no mie), in which the actor wraps his arms and legs around a post, column, or long weapon such as a naginata, and the Fudō no mie (不動の見得), which is meant to resemble the Buddhist figure Fudō Myoō, is a very strong pose, meant to evoke anger and power.

In Kanjinchō, the monk Benkei cuts the Fudō no mie while holding a scroll (the play's titular "subscription list" or kanjinchō) in one hand and Buddhist prayer beads in the other. Another pose taken by Benkei in this play is the so-called "rock-throwing pose" (石投げの見得, Ishinage no mie), which is meant to look like its namesake.

The term tenchi no mie (天地の見得), or "heaven and earth pose," is used when two actors, one low on the stage and one high above, on a rooftop or other set-piece, strike a pose simultaneously.
