= Woodblock printing in Japan =

Ancient technique for reproducing images or text

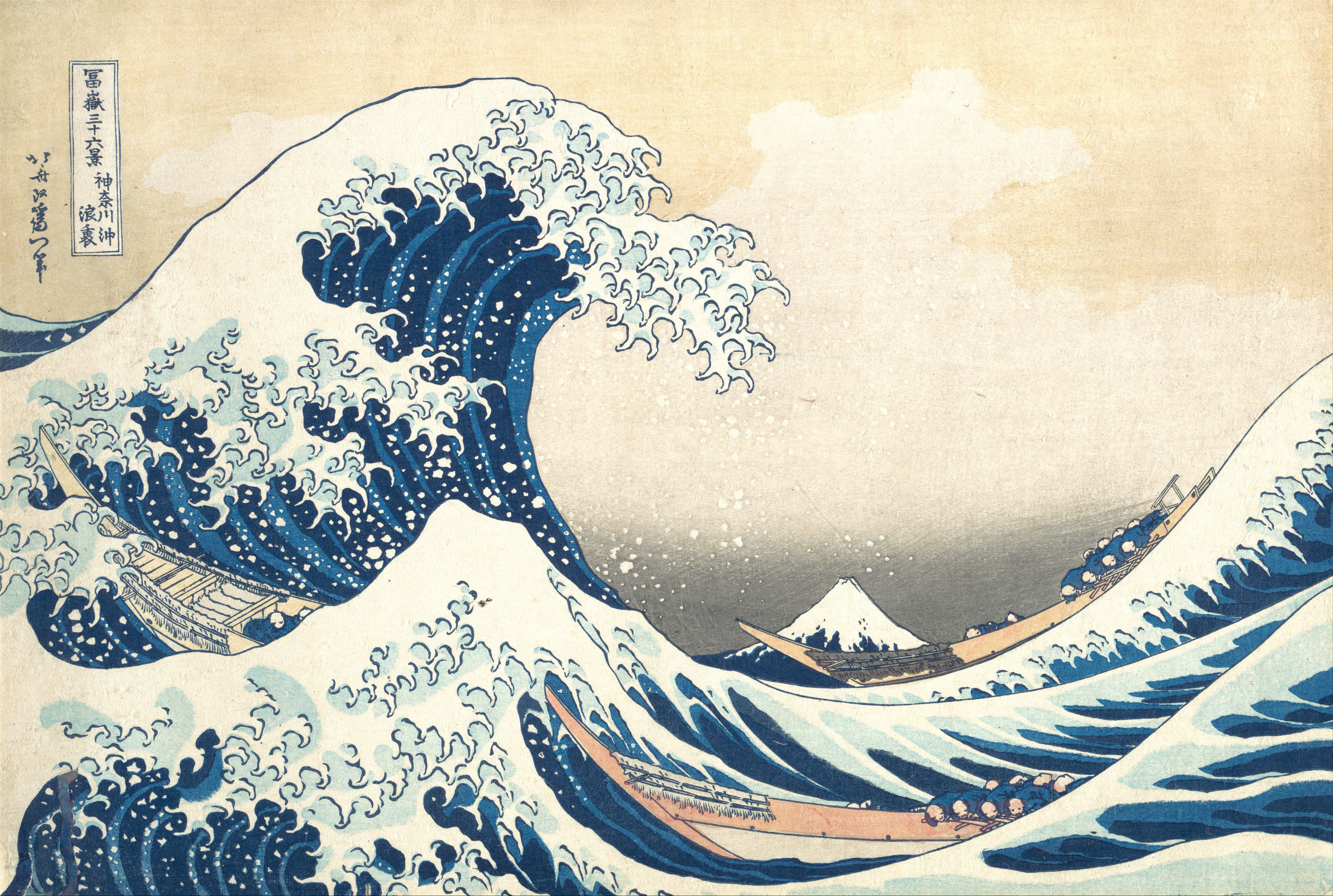
The Great Wave off Kanagawa (神奈川沖浪裏, Kanagawa-oki nami-ura) print by Hokusai Metropolitan Museum of Art

Ukiyo-e printmaking process of "Plum Park in Kameido". Displayed at the Edo-Tokyo Museum.

Woodblock printing in Japan (木版画, mokuhanga) is a technique best known for its use in the ukiyo-e artistic genre, but it was also used for printing books in the same period. Invented in China during the Tang dynasty, woodblock printing was widely adopted in Japan during the Edo period (1603–1868). It is similar to woodcut in Western printmaking in some regards, but was widely used for text as well as images. The Japanese mokuhanga technique differs in that it uses water-based inks—as opposed to Western woodcut, which typically uses oil-based inks. Japanese water-based inks provide a wide range of vivid colors, glazes, and transparency.

== History ==
=== Early, to 13th century ===
Woodblock printing was invented in China under the Tang dynasty, and eventually migrated to Japan in the late 700s, where it was first used to reproduce foreign literature. In 764 the Empress Kōken commissioned one million small wooden pagodas, each containing a small woodblock scroll printed with a Buddhist text (Hyakumantō Darani). These were distributed to temples around the country as thanks for the suppression of the Emi Rebellion of 764. These are the earliest examples of woodblock printing known, or documented, from Japan.

By the eleventh century, Buddhist temples in Japan produced printed books of sutras, mandalas, and other Buddhist texts and images. For centuries, printing was mainly restricted to the Buddhist sphere, as it was too expensive for mass production, and did not have a receptive, literate public as a market. However, an important set of fans of the late Heian period (12th century), containing painted images and Buddhist sutras, reveals from loss of paint that the underdrawing for the paintings was printed from blocks. In the Kamakura period from the 12th century to the 13th century, many books were printed and published by woodblock printing at Buddhist temples in Kyoto and Kamakura. One of the earliest documented examples is a print of the Lotus Sutra produced in 1225 by Koei for the Kofuku-ji temple in Nara, followed by numerous religious prints in Kyoto between the 13th and 14th centuries.

=== Early Edo period ===
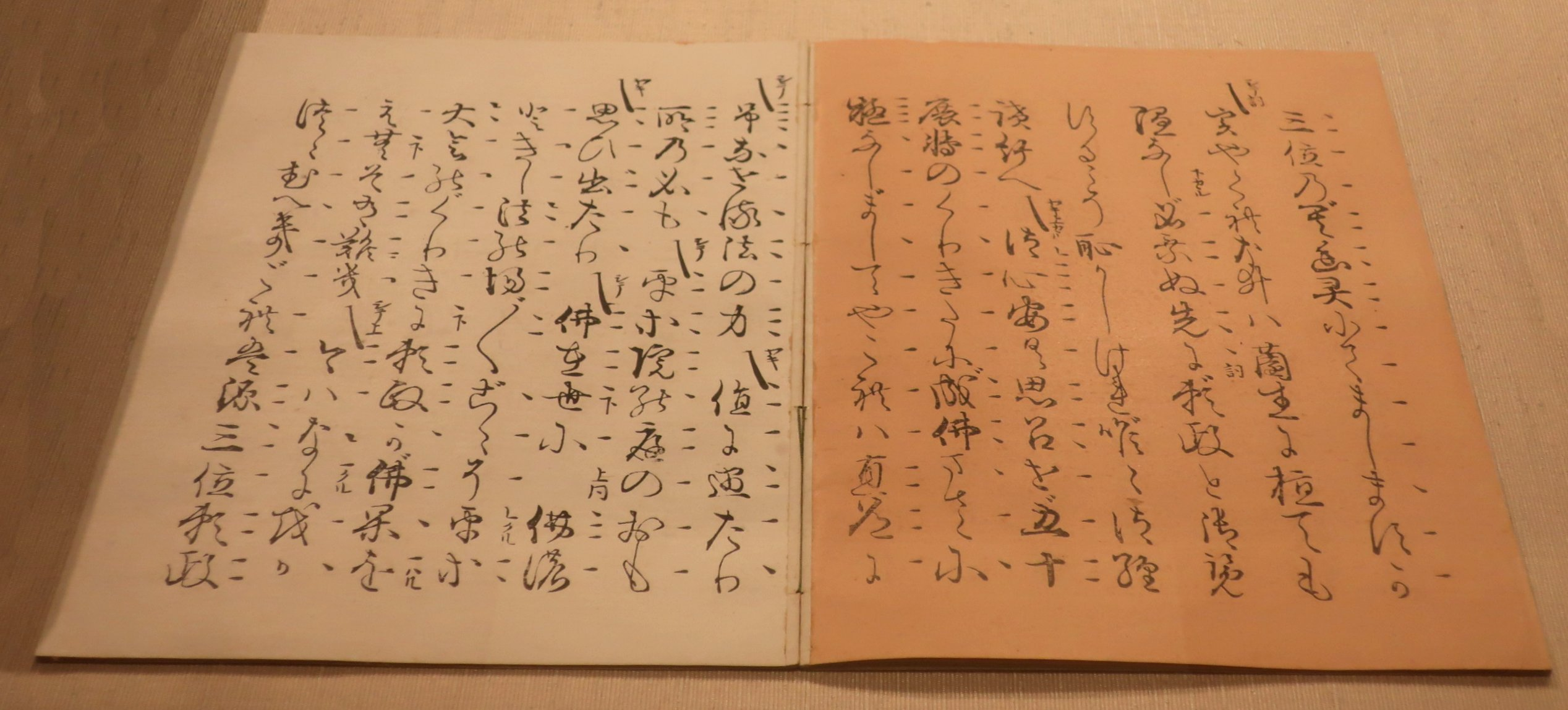
Saga-bon (嵯峨本, Saga Books): libretto for the Noh play Katsuragi by Hon'ami Kōetsu. The Saga-bon is one of the earliest works produced on a movable type press in Japan.

A Western-style movable type printing-press was brought to Japan by the Tenshō embassy in 1590, and was first used for printing in Kazusa, Nagasaki in 1591. However, the use of the western printing press was discontinued after the ban on Christianity in 1614. The printing press seized from Korea by Toyotomi Hideyoshi's forces in 1593 was also in use at the same time as the printing press from Europe. An edition of the Confucian Analects was printed in 1598, using a Korean moveable type printing press, at the order of Emperor Go-Yōzei.

Tokugawa Ieyasu established a printing school at Enko-ji in Kyoto and started publishing books using a domestic wooden movable type printing press instead of metal from 1599. Ieyasu supervised the production of 100,000 types, which were used to print many political and historical books. In 1605, books using a domestic copper movable type printing press began to be published, but copper type did not become mainstream after Ieyasu died in 1616.

The great pioneers in applying the movable type printing press to the creation of artistic books, and in preceding mass production for general consumption, were Honami Kōetsu and Suminokura Soan. At their studio in Saga, Kyoto, the pair created a number of woodblock versions of the Japanese classics, both text and images, essentially converting emaki (handscrolls) to printed books, and reproducing them for wider consumption. These books, now known as Kōetsu Books, Suminokura Books, or Saga Books (嵯峨本, Saga-bon), are considered the first and finest printed reproductions of many of these classic tales; the Saga Book of the Tales of Ise (Ise monogatari), printed in 1608, is especially renowned. For aesthetic reasons, the typeface of the Saga-bon, like that of traditional handwritten books, adopted the renmen-tai (ja), in which several characters are written in succession with smooth brush strokes. As a result, a single typeface was sometimes created by combining two to four semi-cursive and cursive kanji or hiragana characters. In one book, 2,100 characters were created, but 16% of them were used only once.

Despite the appeal of moveable type, however, craftsmen soon decided that the semi-cursive and cursive script style of Japanese writings was better reproduced using woodblocks. By 1640, woodblocks were once again used for nearly all purposes. After the 1640s, movable type printing declined, and books were mass-produced by conventional woodblock printing during most of the Edo period.

=== Later Edo period ===
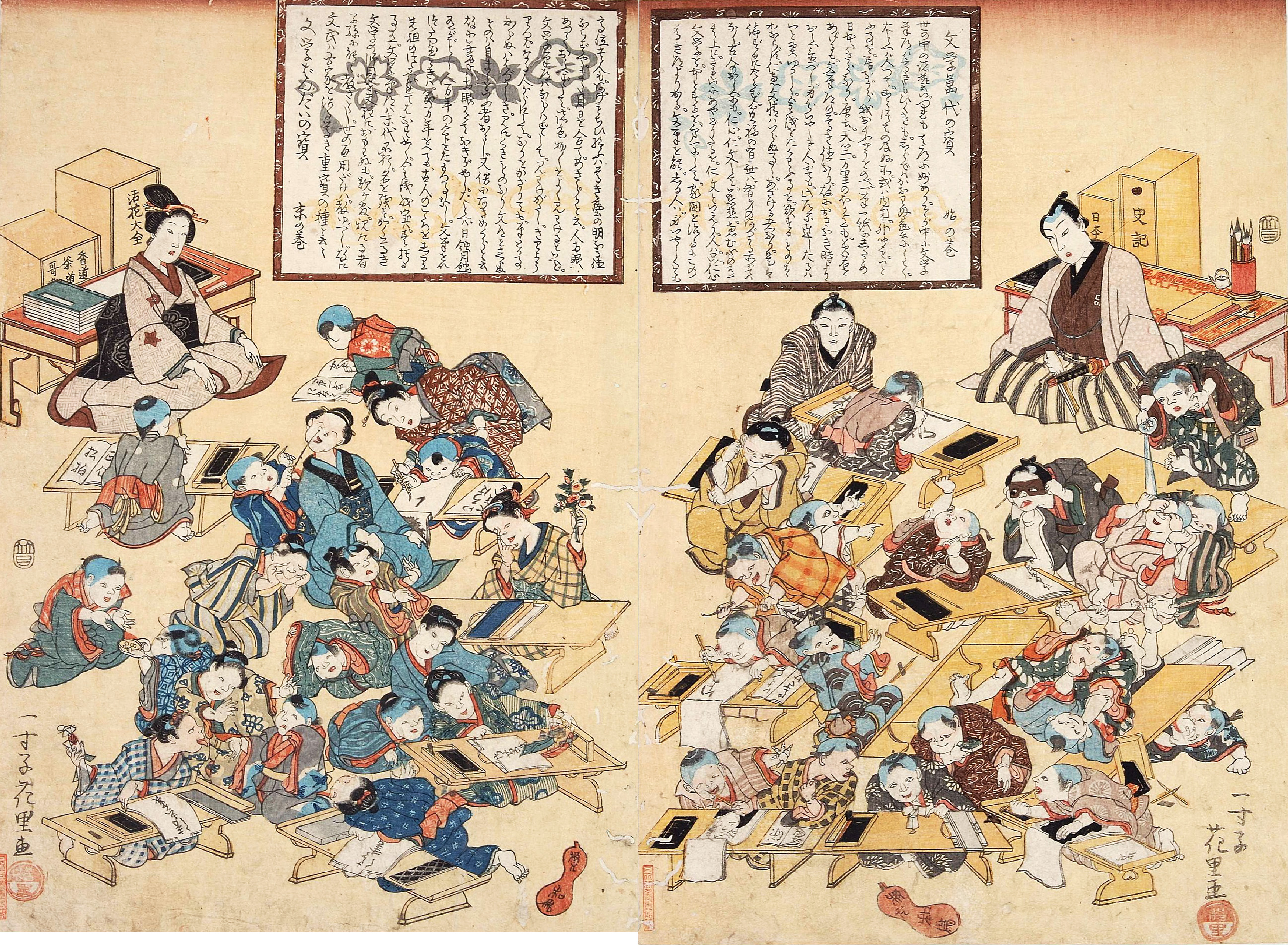
A two piece nishiki-e (colored woodblock print) series depicting a class at terakoya (private educational school)

The mass production of woodblock prints in the Edo period was due to the high literacy rate of Japanese people in those days. The literacy rate of the Japanese in the Edo period was due to the spread of private schools terakoya. There were more than 600 rental bookstores in Edo, and people lent woodblock-printed illustrated books of various genres. While the Saga Books were printed on expensive paper and used various embellishments, being printed specifically for a small circle of literary connoisseurs, other printers in Edo quickly adapted the conventional woodblock printing to produce cheaper books in large numbers, for more general consumption. The content of these books varied widely, including travel guides, gardening books, cookbooks, kibyōshi (satirical novels), sharebon (books on urban culture), kokkeibon (comical books), ninjōbon (romance novel), yomihon, kusazōshi, art books, play scripts for the kabuki and jōruri (puppet) theatre, etc. The best-selling books of this period were Kōshoku Ichidai Otoko (Life of an Amorous Man) by Ihara Saikaku, Nansō Satomi Hakkenden by Takizawa Bakin, and Tōkaidōchū Hizakurige by Jippensha Ikku, and these books were reprinted many times.

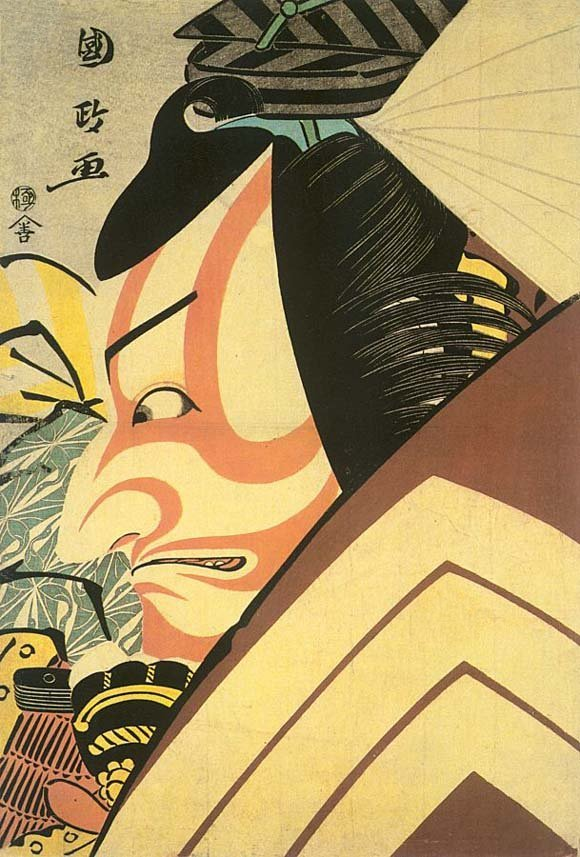
Ukiyo-e based on kabuki actors became popular. Ichikawa Danjūrō V in the popular kabuki play Shibaraku, by Utagawa Kunimasa, 1796

From the 17th century to the 19th century, ukiyo-e depicting secular subjects became very popular among the common people and were mass-produced. ukiyo-e is based on kabuki actors, sumo wrestlers, beautiful women, landscapes of sightseeing spots, historical tales, and so on, and Hokusai and Hiroshige are the most famous artists. In the 18th century, Suzuki Harunobu established the technique of multicolor woodblock printing called nishiki-e and greatly developed Japanese woodblock printing culture such as ukiyo-e. Ukiyo-e influenced European Japonisme and Impressionism. Yoshitoshi was called the last great ukiyo-e master, and his cruel depictions and fantastic expressions influenced later Japanese literature and anime.

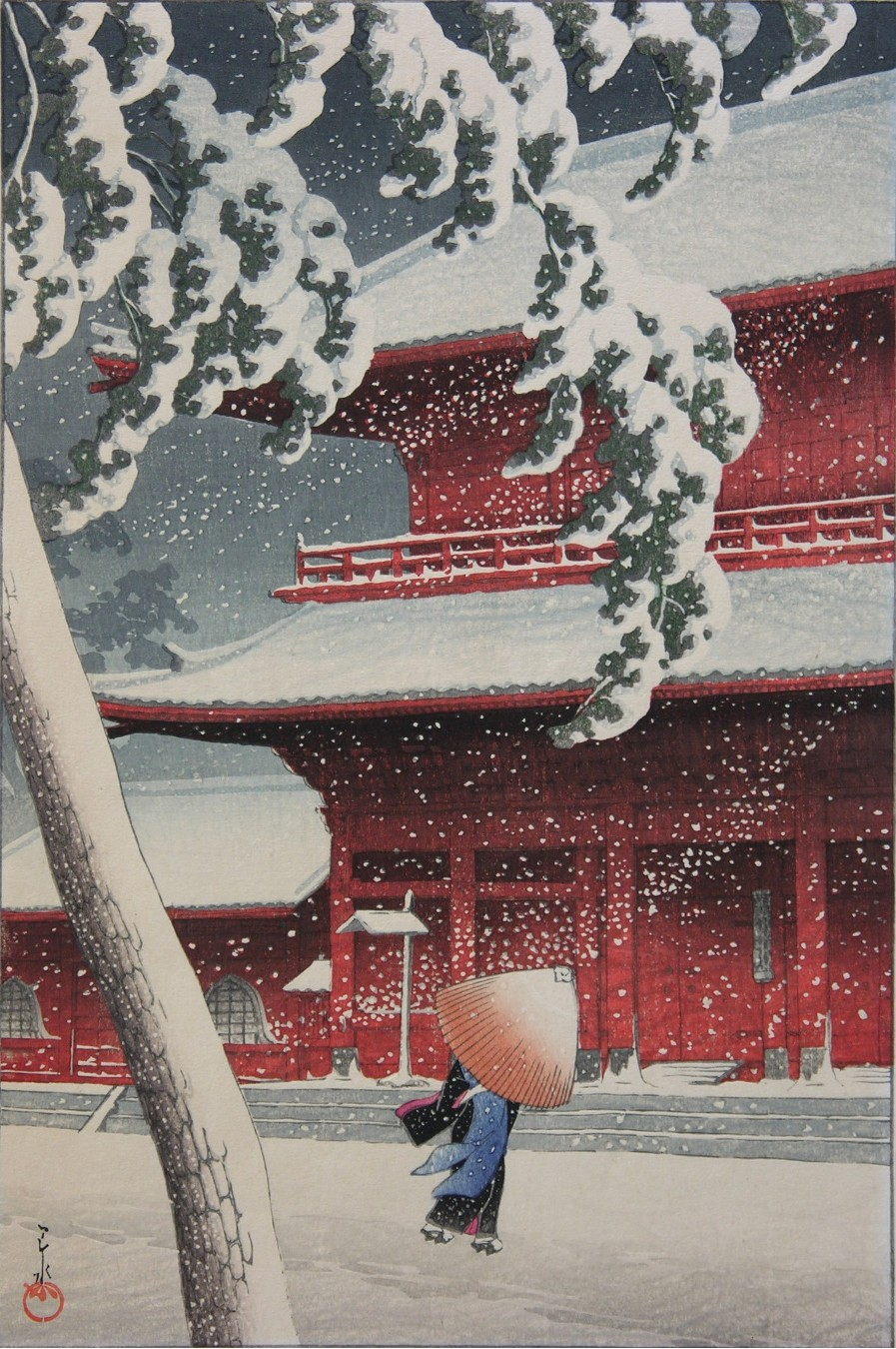
Zōjō-ji in Shiba. From series Twenty Views of Tōkyō by Hasui Kawase, a shin-hanga artist.

Many publishing houses arose and grew, publishing both books and single-sheet prints. One of the most famous and successful was Tsuta-ya. A publisher's ownership of the physical woodblocks used to print a given text or image constituted the closest equivalent to a concept of "copyright" that existed at this time. Publishers or individuals could buy woodblocks from one another, and thus take over the production of certain texts, but beyond the ownership of a given set of blocks (and thus a very particular representation of a given subject), there was no legal conception of the ownership of ideas. Plays were adopted by competing theaters, and either reproduced wholesale, or individual plot elements or characters might be adapted; this activity was considered legitimate and routine at the time.

=== From Meiji period onwards ===
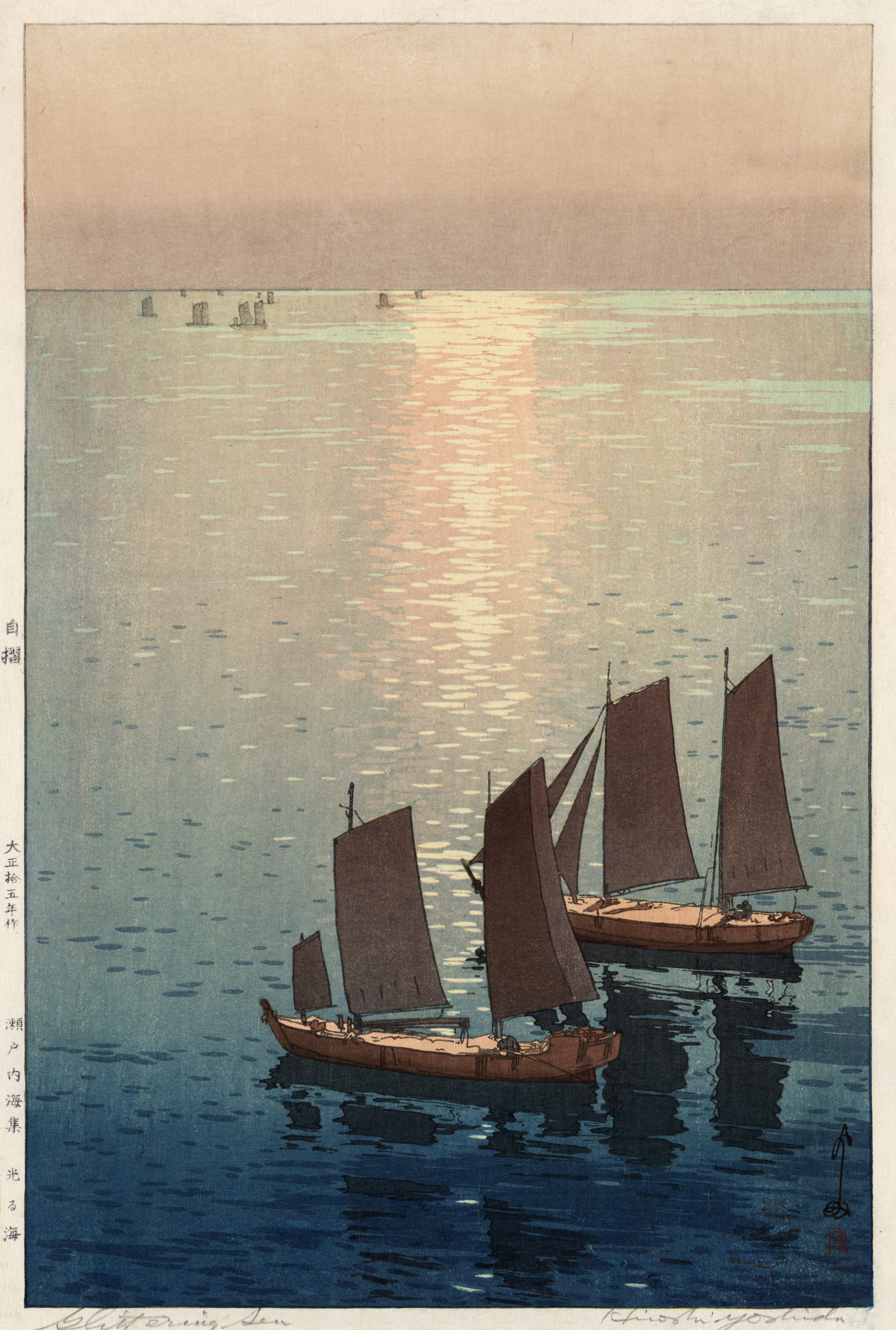
Glittering Sea, 1926. From the series Seto Inland Sea by Hiroshi Yoshida.

After the decline of ukiyo-e and the introduction of modern printing technologies, woodblock printing continued as a method for printing texts as well as for producing art, both within traditional modes such as ukiyo-e and in a variety of more radical or Western forms that might be construed as modern art. In the early 20th century, shin-hanga that fused the tradition of ukiyo-e with the techniques of Western paintings became popular, and the works of Hasui Kawase and Hiroshi Yoshida gained international popularity. Institutes such as the "Adachi Institute of Woodblock Prints" and "Takezasado" continue to produce ukiyo-e prints with the same materials and methods as used in the past.

With the entry into modernity, in Japan, there was a renewal of woodblock printmaking, the hanga. After the death of Hiroshige in 1858, the ukiyo-e practically disappeared. Its last manifestations correspond to Goyō Hashiguchi, who already shows a clear Western influence in the realism and plastic treatment of his images. With the entry into the 20th century, the artists who practiced engraving evolved to a style more in line with modern Japanese taste. One of its first exponents was Hiroshi Yoshida, author of landscapes influenced by nineteenth-century English watercolor. In 1918 the Nippon Sōsaku Hanga Kyōkai (Japan Printmaking Artists' Association) was founded, a group of artists who synthesized traditional Japanese painting with the new Western aesthetic. Notable among its members were Kōshirō Onchi, Un'ichi Hiratsuka and Shikō Munakata. The first, influenced by Vasili Kandinsky, was the first to produce abstract engravings, of a style however distinctly oriental for its chromaticism of soft tones and for its lyricism and imagination. Hiratsuka was more traditional in technique and choice of subjects, with a preference for black and white monochrome, in themes ranging from Buddhism to landscapes and popular scenes, in which he combined traditional methods with modern effects. Munakata was noted for his original, personal and expressive work, with an unmistakable stamp. He also focused on Buddhist themes, generally also monochrome, but with a free, carefree style, with a careless appearance but of great vitality.

== Technique ==
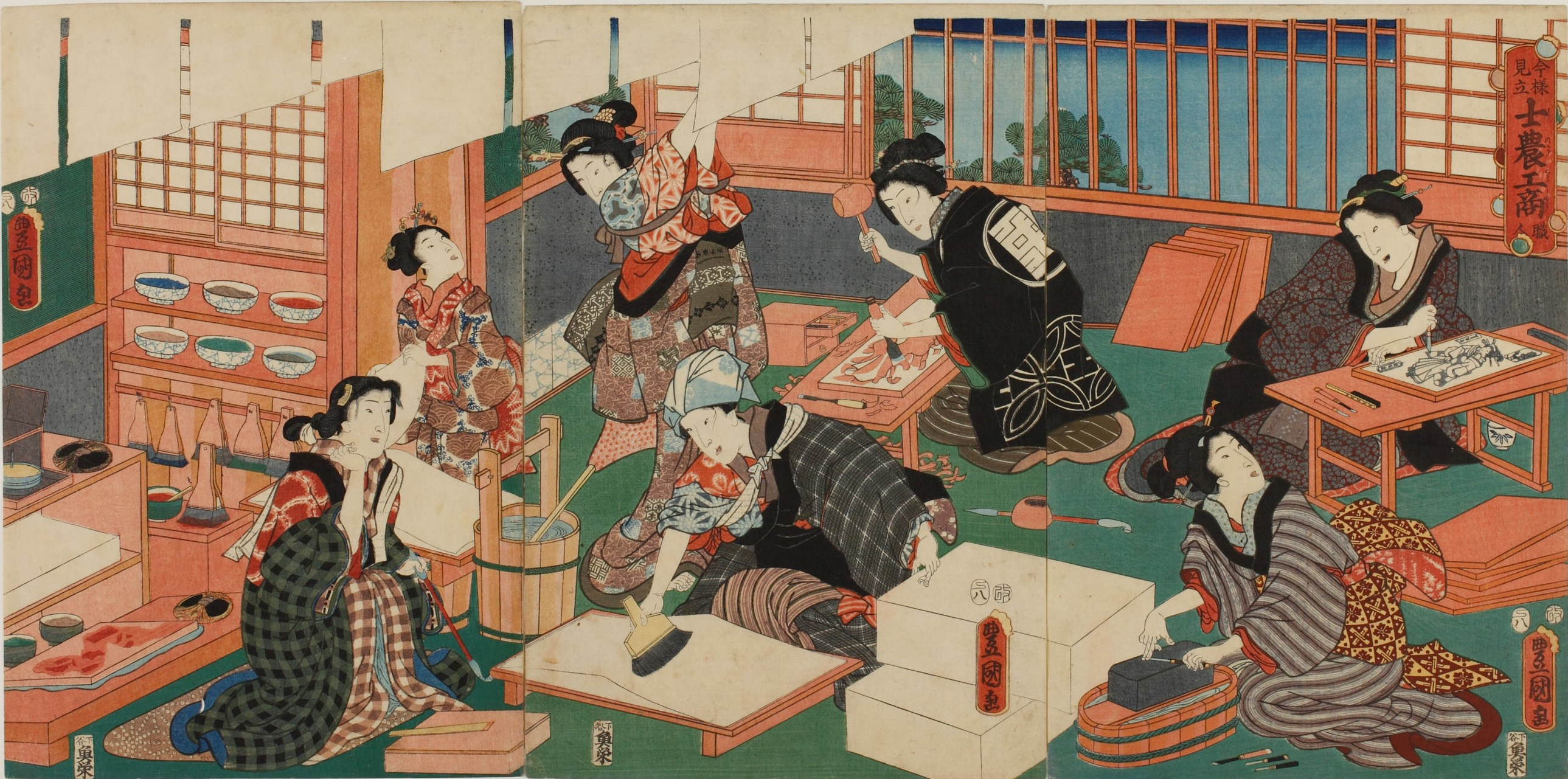
The woodblock printing process, Kunisada, 1857. A fantasy version, wholly staffed by well-dressed "beauties". In fact, few women worked in printmaking.

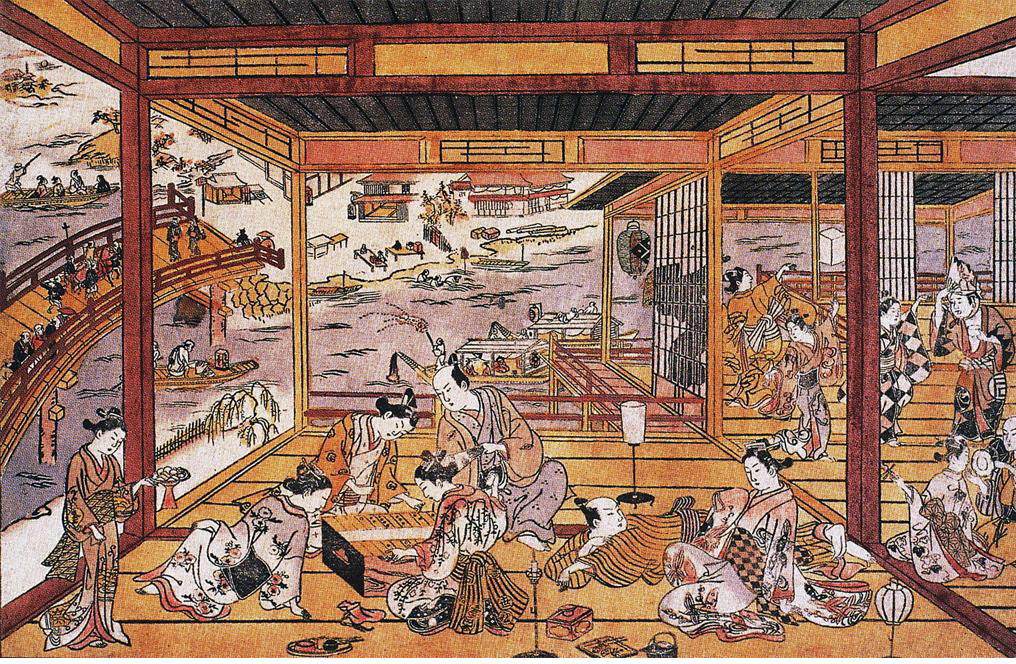
Western-style graphical perspective (uki-e) and increased use of printed colour were among the innovations Okumura Masanobu claimed. Taking the Evening Cool by Ryōgoku Bridge, c. 1745

The technique for printing texts and images was generally similar. The obvious differences were the volume produced when working with texts (many pages for a single work), and the complexity of multiple colors in some images. Images in books were almost always in monochrome (black ink only), and for a time art prints were likewise monochrome or done in only two or three colors.

The text or image is first drawn onto thin washi (Japanese paper), called gampi, then glued face-down onto a plank of close-grained wood, usually a block of smooth cherry. Oil could be used to make the lines of the image more visible. An incision is made along both sides of each line or area. Wood is then chiseled away, based on the drawing outlines. The block is inked using a brush and then a flat hand-held tool called a baren is used to press the paper against the woodblock to apply the ink to the paper. The traditional baren is made in three parts: it consists of an inner core made from bamboo leaves twisted into a rope of varying thicknesses, the nodules thus created being what ultimately applies the pressure to the print. This coil is contained in a disk called an "ategawa" made from layers of very thin paper which is glued together and wrapped in a dampened bamboo leaf, the ends of which are then tied to create a handle. Modern printmakers have adapted this tool, and today barens made of aluminum with ball bearings to apply the pressure are used, as well as less expensive plastic versions.

=== Evolution of printing techniques ===
The first prints were simply one-color (sumizuri-e), with additional colors applied by hand (kappazuri-e). The development of two registration marks carved into the blocks called "kento" was especially helpful with the introduction of multiple colors that had to be applied with precision over previous ink layers. The sheet of paper to be printed is placed in the kento, then lowered onto the woodblock.

=== Advancements in color printing ===
While, again, text was nearly always monochrome, as were images in books, the growth of the popularity of ukiyo-e brought with it demand for ever increasing numbers of colors and complexity of techniques. The stages of this development follow:

- Sumizuri-e (墨摺り絵; "ink printed pictures")—monochrome printing using only black ink
- Beni-e (紅絵)—monochrome prints usually printed in pink
- Benizuri-e (紅摺り絵; "crimson printed pictures")—red ink details or highlights added by hand after the printing process; green was sometimes used as well
- Tan-e (丹絵)—orange highlights using a red pigment called tan
- Aizuri-e (藍摺り絵; "indigo printed pictures"), Murasaki-e (紫絵; "purple pictures"), and other styles in which a single color was used in addition to, or instead of, black ink
- Urushi-e (漆絵)—a method that thickened the ink with glue, emboldening the image. Printers often used gold, mica, and other substances to enhance the image further. Urushi-e can also refer to paintings using lacquer instead of paint. Lacquer was rarely, if ever, used on prints.
- Nishiki-e (錦絵; "brocade pictures")—a method of using multiple blocks for separate portions of the image, using a number of colors to achieve complex and detailed images. A separate block was carved to apply only the part of the image designated for a single color. Registration marks called kentō (見当) were used to ensure correspondence between the application of each block.

== Schools and movements ==
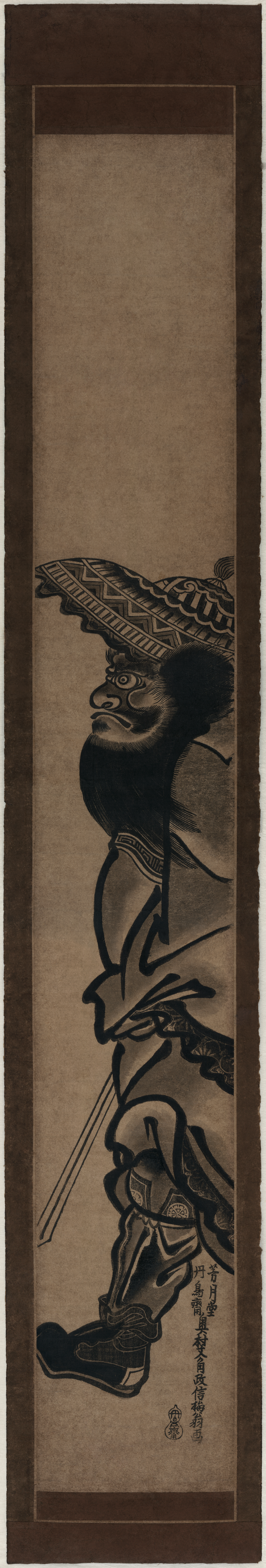
"Shōki zu" (Zhong Kui), by Okumura Masanobu, 1741–1751. An example of pillar print format, 69.2 x 10.1 cm.

Japanese printmaking, as with many other features of Japanese art, tended to organize itself into schools and movements. The most notable schools (see also schools of ukiyo-e artists) and, later, movements of moku-hanga were:

- Torii school, from 1700
- Kaigetsudō school, from 1700 to 1714
- Katsukawa school, from about 1720s, including the artists Shunsho and Shuntei
- Kawamata school, from about 1725, including the artists Suzuki Harunobu and Koryusai
- Hokusai school, from about 1786, including the artists Hokusai, Hokuei and Gakutei
- Kitagawa school, from about 1794, including the artists Utamaro I, Kikumaro I and II
- Utagawa school, from 1842, including the artists Kunisada and Hiroshige
- Sōsaku-hanga, "Creative Prints" movement, from 1904
- Shin-hanga "New Prints" movement, from 1915, including Hasui Kawase and Hiroshi Yoshida

Other artists, such as Sharaku, Kabukidō Enkyō, Sugakudo, and Shibata Zesshin, are considered independent artists, free of school associations, and presumably, without the resulting associated benefits from publishers, who might be less inclined to produce prints by an unaffiliated artist. However, many of the surviving examples speak to the contrary. The earliest examples by these artists are among the most desirable, valuable, and rarest of all ukiyo-e. Additionally, many examples exhibit very fine printing, using expensive mica (kirazuri), premium inks and the highest quality papers.

== Print sizes ==
The following are common Tokugawa-period print sizes. Sizes varied depending on the period, and those given are approximate; they are based on the pre-printing paper sizes, and paper was often trimmed after printing.

Print sizes
| Name | Trans. | cm (in) | Ref. |
|---|---|---|---|
| koban (小判) | small about 1/4 the size of ōban | 19.5 × 13 (7.7 × 5.1) | |
| aiban (合判) | intermediate | 34 × 22.5 (13.4 × 8.9) | |
| bai-ōban (倍大判) | intermediate | 45.7 × 34.5 (18.0 × 13.6) | |
| chūban (中判) | medium | 26 × 19 (10.2 × 7.5) | |
| hashira-e (柱絵) | pillar print | 73 × 12 (28.7 × 4.7) | |
| hosoban (細判) or hoso-e (細絵) | narrow | 33 × 14.5 (13.0 × 5.7) | |
| hosoban (細判) or hoso-e (細絵) | narrow | 39 × 17 (15.4 × 6.7) | |
| kakemono-e (掛物絵) | hanging scroll | 76.5 × 23 (30.1 × 9.1) | |
| nagaban (長判) | long | 50 × 20 (19.7 × 7.9) | |
| ōban (大判) | large | 38 × 25.5 (15.0 × 10.0) | |
| ōban (大判) | large | 58 × 32 (23 × 13) | |
| ō-tanzaku (大短冊判) | large poem card | 38 × 17 (15.0 × 6.7) | |
| chū-tanzaku (中短冊判) | medium poem card | 38 × 13 (15.0 × 5.1) | |
| surimono (刷物) | | 35 × 20 (13.8 × 7.9) | |
| surimono (刷物) | | 12 × 9 (4.7 × 3.5) – 19 × 13 (7.5 × 5.1) | |

The Japanese terms for vertical (portrait) and horizontal (landscape) formats for images are tate-e (立て絵) and yoko-e (横絵), respectively.

== See also ==
- List of ukiyo-e terms
- List of art techniques
