= Bandō Minosuke II =

Japanese actor

- 二代目 坂東 巳之助
- Born: Mitsuhisa Morita (Note: While the stage names of all kabuki actors have retained traditional order (Surname-Givenname) on Wikipedia, birth names of those born after the Meiji Restoration are in Western order (Givenname-Surname).); 16 September 1989 (age 36); Tokyo
- Occupation: Kabuki actor
- Parents: Bandō Mitsugorō X (father); Hizuru Kotobuki (mother)
- Relatives: Bandō Shūchō II (great-great-grandfather); Bandō Mitsugorō VIII (great-grandfather); Bandō Shūchō III (great-grandfather); Bandō Mitsugorō IX (grandfather); Nao Morita (sister) (Note: She is an actress and former ballet dancer); Sachina Morita (sister)
- Website: Jūdai Bandō Mitsugorō

Bandō Minosuke II (二代目 坂東 巳之助, Nidaime Bandō Minosuke; born 16 September 1989, in Tokyo) is a Japanese actor, kabuki actor, and the leading bassist of buyō Bandō-ryū. His real name is Mitsuhisa Morita (守田 光寿, Morita Mitsuhisa). He is the current and second holder of the Kabuki name "Bandō Minosuke". Yamatoya is his yagō and Mitsudai is his family crest. He is represented by the Horipro Booking Agency.

== Early life ==
Born into a famous Kabuki acting family, Minosuke II is the eldest son of the renowned Kabuki actor and TV host Bandō Mitsugorō X and former Takarazuka Revue actress Hizuru Kotobuki, (Note: She was a member of the Takarazuka Revue from 1973 to 1982 and during that time, she became known for being an otokoyaku, i.e., an actress who plays only male roles.) the grandson of Bandō Mitsugorō IX and the great-grandson of celebrated Bandō Mitsugorō VIII. Due to him being the eldest son and heir of Mitsugorō X, it is said that Minosuke II will take the name Bando Mitsugorō XI (十一代目 坂東三津五郎) and become the head of the Yamatoya acting house in the near future.

From April 2006, he formed an amateur band called Zero click with his real name Mitsuhisa Morita. Bandō was in charge of drums, but since March 2007, he ceased activities for members to take the university entrance exam. He also have a band called KBK 48 with Yakusha and Tokoyama. Bandō has a drum set, ten guitars, etc. at his home.

According to his father Mitsugorō, from the severity of the family environment and practice, Minosuke said that there was a time when he was troubled becoming an actor, but now he is determined to make a move to a kabuki way.

Bandō dropped out from Horikoshi High School.

== Career ==
- In September 1991 the Kabuki-za "Bandō Mitsugorō VIII Jū Nana-kai-ki Tsuizen" Kairaishi (傀儡師), made his first visit.
- In November 1995 It is a small monkey of Shiba-za of Kabuki-za Yamato Kana Zai-gyō Keizu (Ranpei Monogurai (蘭平物狂)) and Kotobuki Utsubo Zaru (寿靭猿) probably the name of Bandō Minosuke as a proponent.

== Filmography ==
=== Kabuki ===
Date	Title	Role	Notes	Ref.
	Kami Akie Wagō Torikumi	Aoyama no Mitsuyoshi		
	Hikoichi banashi	Tengu no Ko		
	Hatsu Kasumizora Sumiyoshi "Kappore"	Hikari Bōzu		
	Kaidan Botandōrō	Detchi Sadakichi		
	Kagurafū Kumoi Nokyoku Mari "Dontsuku"	Kakubee		
	Super Kabuki II One Piece	Roronoa Zoro, Bon Clay, Squardo		

=== TV dramas ===
Date	Title	Role	Notes	Ref.
2011	Kamen Rider OOO	Kosuke Sakata	Episodes 31 and 32	
2024	Dear Radiance	Emperor En'yū	Taiga drama	

=== Films ===
Date	Title	Role	Notes	Ref.
2010	Sakuradamon-gai no Hen	Arimura Jizaemon		
2013	The Kiyosu Conference	Oda Nobutaka		
2017	Tokyo Ghoul	Uta		
2019	Tokyo Ghoul S	Uta		
2021	Baragaki: Unbroken Samurai	Emperor Kōmei		
2024	Sakura	Manabu Henmi		
