= Bandō Mitsugorō III =

Bandō Mitsugorō III 三代目坂東三津五郎
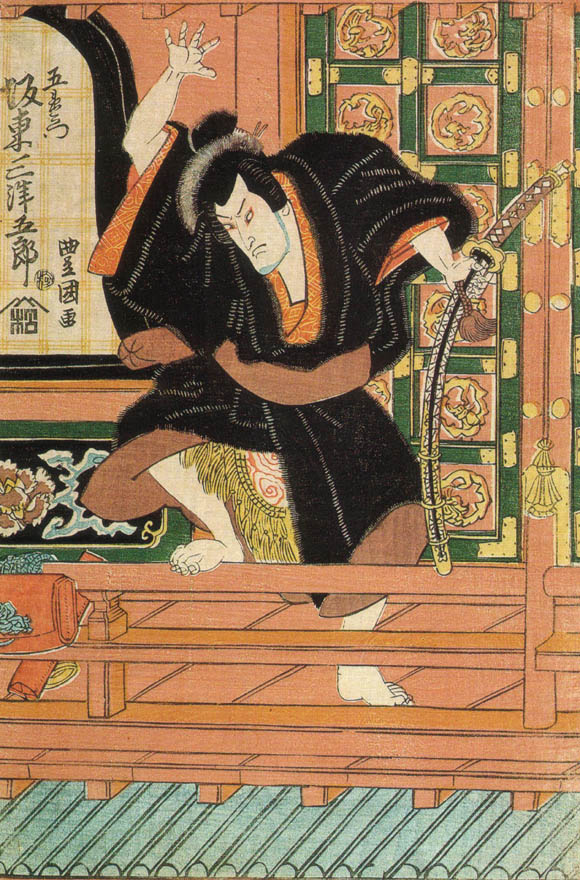
- Bandō Mitsugorō III playing the role of Ishikawa Goemon in the drama Sanmon Gosan no Kiri, which was staged in March 1820 at the Nakamura-za (print made by Utagawa Toyokuni I).
- Born: 1773; Edo, Japan
- Died: December 27, 1831 (aged 57–58); Edo, Japan
- Other names: Bandō Minosuke I, Morita Kanjirō II, Bandō Mitahachi I, Yamatoya, Eiki no Oyagata, Shūka
- Years active: 1778–1831
- Children: Morita Kan'ya X (adopted son); Morita Kan'ya XI (adopted son); Bandō Shūka I (adopted son)
- Parent(s): Bandō Mitsugorō I (biological father); Morita Kan'ya VIII (adoptive father)
- Relatives: Morita Kan'ya V (great-grandfather); Nakamura Jūsuke I (great-grandfather); Morita Kan'ya VI (grandfather); Bandō Mitahachi (brother); Ogino Izaburō II (father-in-law)

Bandō Mitsugorō III (三代目 坂東 三津五郎, Sandaime Bandō Mitsugorō) (1773–1831) was a prominent male kabuki actor. He was considered one of the best tachiyaku (strong male role specialists) of the early 19th century. He is famous for a great many roles, and for his rivalry with the Kamigata (Kyoto-Osaka) actor Nakamura Utaemon III.

He was also known as Eiki Mitsugorõ or Eiki-no Mitsugorõ. His disciples included Bandõ Mitsue.

== Names ==
Like most Kabuki actors, and many artists of his time, Mitsugorō bore a number of names. The third to bear the name Bandō Mitsugorō, he was also called Bandō Minosuke I, Morita Kanjirō II and Bandō Mitahachi I earlier in his career. A member of the Yamato-ya guild, he could be called by this name as well (see yagō). Finally, Mitsugorō was known in poetry circles as Shūka, and as he developed something of a reputation on the streets of Edo, he acquired the nickname "Eiki no Oyagata" (boss of the Eiki district).

== Lineage ==
Born into a family of actors, his parents were Bandō Mitsugorō I and Morita Kanya VI's daughter; Morita Kanya V and Nakamura Jūsuke I were his grandfathers. Mitsugorō was adopted by Morita Kanya VIII, and was the son-in-law of Ogino Izaburō II. Later in his career, he adopted three sons, Morita Kanya X, Morita Kanya XI and Bandō Shūka I, and reared them in the theatre.

== Life and career ==
Born in Edo in 1775, he made his stage debut at the age of three, at the Morita-za, under the name Bandō Mitahachi I. The young actor took a number of different stage names over the course of his childhood, becoming the third Bandō Mitsugorō at the Nakamura-za in 1799. His father died in 1782.

As the 19th century began, Mitsugorō performed in a great number of plays and a myriad of roles, both male and female, at the Morita-za, Nakamura-za, and Ichimura-za theatres. He came to be known for his dancing, and in particular for hengemono, dance plays in which he would quick-change through a number of roles. Though he played mostly women in these dance plays, he also frequently played sumo wrestlers, and lead hero roles in some of the most popular and famous kabuki plays.

In May 1815, he performed at the Kawarazaki-za alongside Iwai Hanshirō V, Matsumoto Kōshirō V and Ichikawa Danjūrō VII, some of the most famous actors of the time. Over the years, he developed a rivalry with kamigata actor Nakamura Utaemon III, also known as Shikan. These types of rivalries were not uncommon in the kabuki world, particularly between actors from Edo and Kamigata, but were likely friendly rivalries, promoted more by the fans and by the theatre managers, rather than by genuine ill-feelings on the parts of the actors towards one another. The two would perform together many times, both in Edo and in Kamigata, their rivalry extending over many years.

Following a hengemono farewell performance, Mitsugorō left Edo and moved to Osaka in December 1820. There, he performed primarily at the Kado no Shibai, and frequently alongside Utaemon III. He also spent time performing in Nagoya, and in Kyoto at the Kitagawa no Shibai, two cities where kabuki was far less prolific than in Edo and Osaka.

Mitsugorō was ranked as goku-jō-jō-kichi (extreme-superior-superior-excellent) in the 1822 hyōbanki (a popular publication ranking and evaluating actors and performances). In February of that year, his rivalry with Utaemon III reached its climax. Both actors simultaneously played the popular and powerful role of the thief Ishikawa Goemon at different theaters.

He returned to Edo soon afterwards, marking the end of his 13-month stay in Kamigata. Over the following years, he would perform many more times, primarily at the Ichimura-za. In addition to sumo wrestler roles and hengemono quick-change dances, he played a number of different roles in Sugawara Denju Tenarai Kagami, Yoshitsune Senbon Zakura, Tōkaidō Yotsuya Kaidan, and other very popular and famous plays.

His last performance was in November 1831, in Matsu o Chikara Tomoe no Fuji Nami at the Kawarazaki-za. The following month he fell ill and died.
