= Oshiguma =

Impression of a kabuki actor's face makeup on cloth

An example of an oshiguma, with impressions of 3 different kumadori and autographs-inscriptions for each; created in 1922

An oshiguma (押隈) is an impression of the kumadori (face make-up) of kabuki actors on a piece of cloth, usually silk or cotton, created as an artwork and memento.

Oshiguma are customarily made after the performance of a kabuki play, though not necessarily after every performance, and given as highly valued souvenirs of the event. A single oshiguma may have face-impressions from one or several actors, usually all from the same show, illustrating the make-up designs for major characters in the play. It may also include autographs, dates and additional inscriptions; sometimes other graphic elements are added to the design.

The same term can also be used to describe an artistic depiction of kabuki make-up created by other means, but intended to emulate the appearance of a face-print.

== See also ==
- Oshiroi, the white foundation used by kabuki actors
- Clown Egg Register
