= Kamakura Gongorō Kagemasa =

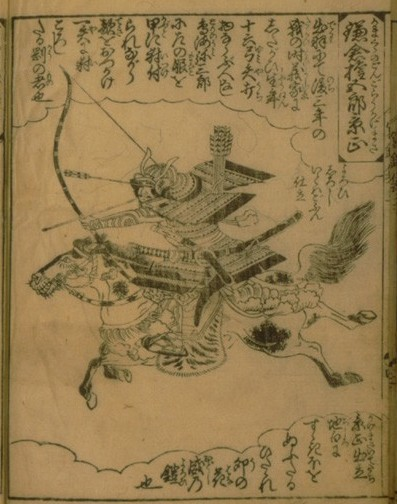
Kamakura Gongorō, a book illustration from 1766

Kamakura Gongorō Kagemasa (鎌倉権五郎景政) (born 1069) was a samurai descended from the Taira clan, who fought for the Minamoto clan in the Gosannen War of Japan's Heian period. He is famous for having continued to fight after losing an eye in battle during that war. This was in 1085, when Kagemasa was sixteen years of age.

The progenitor of the Nagao and Kagawa clans, Kagemasa is also claimed as an ancestor by Ōba Kagechika, a famous figure of the Genpei War (1180–1185). The family name "Kamakura" comes from his family's residence in the city of Kamakura (in today's Kanagawa Prefecture), where his father was a powerful official. The exact identity of his father is unclear, but most scholars cite either Taira no Kagenari or Taira no Kagetōri as likely names.

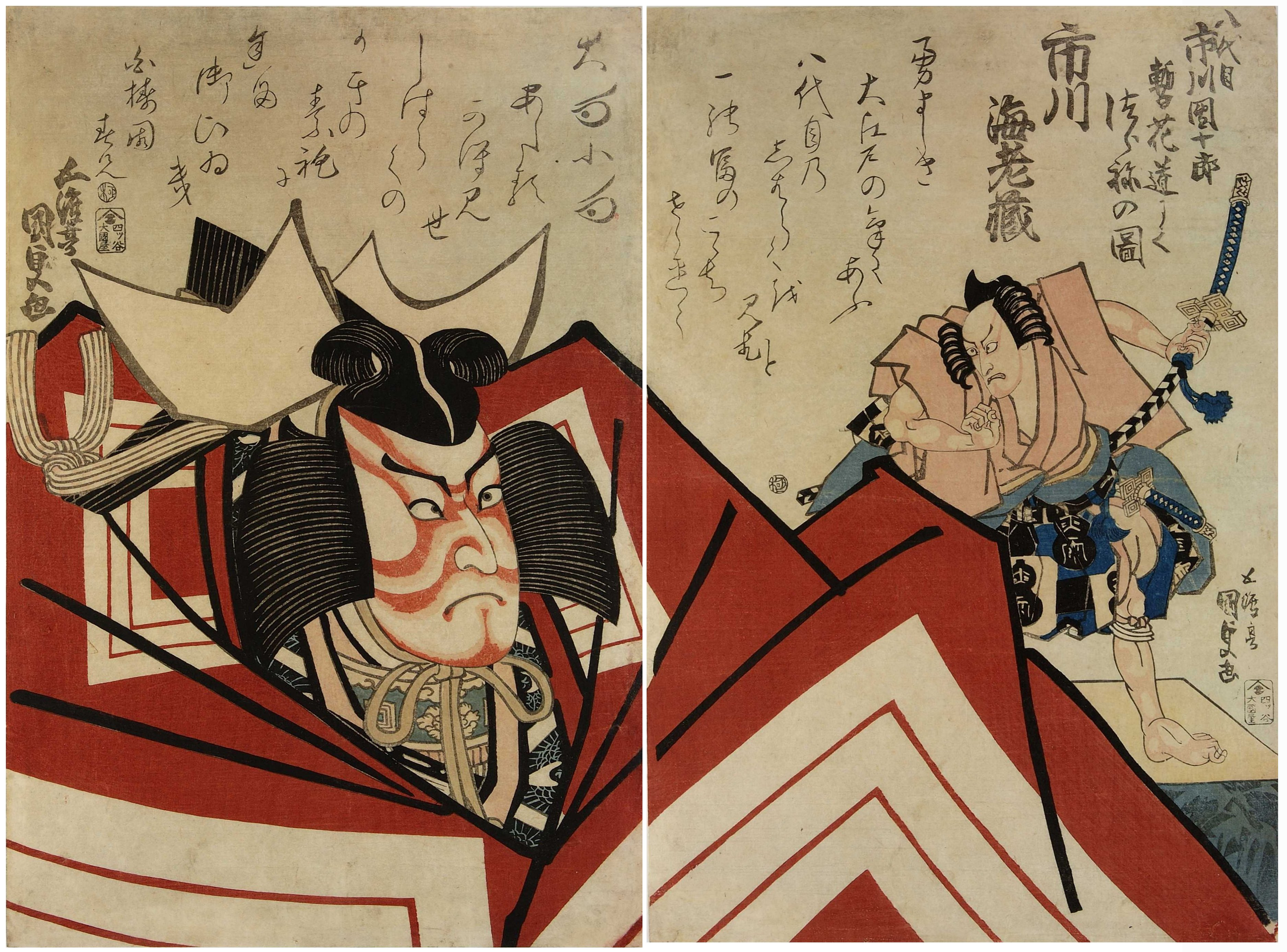
Ukiyo-e print depicting Ichikawa Danjūrō VIII as Kamakura Gongorō Kagemasa (foreground), hero of the play Shibaraku

Kamakura Gongorō Kagemasa is the hero of the kabuki play Shibaraku, one of the most widely recognized of all kabuki roles and one most associated with the form among those with only a cursory knowledge of the form. Kagemasa is represented in the play with bold red and white face makeup, and a massive costume with huge sleeves, often bearing the crest of the actor Ichikawa Danjūrō.
