= Bando (disambiguation) =

Bando is a Burmese self-defense martial art.

Bando may also refer to:

== Practices ==
- Bando (sport), a traditional Welsh sport and predecessor of Bandy
- Bando yoga

== People ==
- Chris Bando (born 1956), American baseball player
- Sal Bando (1944–2023), American baseball player
- Phillip Lehman, a French-American graffiti artist known as Bando

== Arts and entertainment ==
- "Bando" (song), by Anna, 2020
- "Bando", a 2013 song by Migos from Y.R.N. (Young Rich Niggas)
- Bando, a 2014 short film starring Migos, directed by Rik Cordero, based on the song
- "Bando", a 2016 song by A Boogie wit da Hoodie and Don Q from Highbridge the Label: The Takeover Vol. 1

== Other uses ==
- Bandō, Ibaraki, a town in Japan
- Bandolier, in weaponry
- Abandoned house, specifically for drugs

== See also ==
- Bando Stone & the New World, a 2024 album by Childish Gambino
- Bandō (disambiguation)
