= Bandō Mitsugorō X =

Japanese television presenter and kabuki actor (1956–2015)

- 十代目 坂東 三津五郎
- Born: Hisashi Morita; January 23, 1956; Chūō-ku, Tokyo, Japan
- Died: February 21, 2015 (aged 59)
- Other names: Bandō Yasosuke V
- Occupation: Kabuki actor
- Years active: 1962–2015
- Spouses: Hizuru Kotobuki (m. 1983–1997); Sato Kondō (m. 1998–2000)
- Children: Nao Morita; Bandō Minosuke II
- Father: Bandō Mitsugorō IX
- Relatives: Bandō Shūchō II (great-grandfather); Bandō Mitsugorō VIII (grandfather); Bandō Shūchō III (grandfather)

Bandō Mitsugorō X (Japanese: 十代目 坂東 三津五郎) (January 23, 1956 – February 2, 2015) was a Japanese television presenter and kabuki actor. He was the grandson of Bandō Mitsugorō VIII and son of Bandō Mitsugorō IX.

== Lineage ==
Born into a renowned family of Kabuki actors from Tokyo, he comes from a long line of actors who originally focused on onnagata roles (i.e. female roles) but later became focused solely on tachiyaku roles (i.e. male roles).

His great-grandfather, Bandō Shūchō II (二代目 坂東秀調) was a well-known onnagata who was a disciple of two well-known figures in Kabuki theater, Morita Kan'ya XII (the leading kabuki theater manager during the first half of the Meiji era) and Ichikawa Kodanji IV (one of the best tachiyaku actors of the 19th century).

His grandfather Bandō Mitsugorō VIII (八代目 坂東三津五郎) was one of the greatest tachiyaku actors of the Showa era and his main specialty was the aragoto roles.

His other grandfather (son of Bandō Shūchō II), Bandō Shūchō III (三代目 坂東秀調) was known to be an onnagata actor like his father (Shūchō II).

His father, Bandō Mitsugorō IX (九代目 坂東三津五郎), like much of his family, was also a tachiyaku actor, although he did not achieve the same fame as his father (Mitsugorō VIII) or his son (Mitsugorō X), being known for being a supporting actor.

Like Mitsugorō IX, Mitsugorō X's uncles Bando Matatarō VII (七代目 坂東又太郎) and Ichikawa Komazō X (十代目 市川高麗蔵) were also kabuki actors, both known for being kaneru yakusha (i.e., playing both male and female roles) and for, like Mitsugoro IX, being supporting actors.

Mitsugorō X's cousin, Bandō Shūchō V (五代目 坂東秀調) is known for being an outstanding supporting actor, who unlike many actors, started out as an onnagata actor in his early career, but is currently known for being a tachiyaku actor.

Mitsugorō X's son, Bandō Minosuke II (二代目 坂東巳之助), is a popular and rising kabuki and TV actor who, like many actors in his family (such as his great-grandfather Mitsugorō VIII and his father Mitsugorō X), is a tachiyaku actor specializing in aragoto roles. Due to the fact that he is the acting head of the Yamatoya acting house and the eldest son and heir of Mitsugorō X as well, it is said that Minosuke II will take the name Bando Mitsugorō XI (十一代目 坂東三津五郎) and become the head of the Yamatoya acting house in the near future.

== Filmography ==
=== Films ===
- Mishima: A Life in Four Chapters (1985) – Mizoguchi
- Rikyu (1989) – Ishida Mitsunari
- Sharaku (1995) – Matsudaira Sadanobu
- Like Asura (2003) – Sadaharu Masukawa
- Love and Honor (2006) – Tōya Shimada
- Kabei: Our Mother (2008) – Shigeru Nogami
- The Lightning Tree (2010) – Tokugawa Ienari
- Isoroku (2011) – Teikichi Hori

=== Television ===
- NHK Taiga drama series
  - Katsu Kaishū (1974) – Tokugawa Iemochi
  - Takeda Shingen (1988) – Suwa Yorishige
  - Tokugawa Yoshinobu (1999) – Katsu Kaishū
  - Kōmyō ga Tsuji (2006) – Akechi Mitsuhide
- On'yado Kawasemi (1981) – Masakichi
- Onihei Hankachō (1989) – Matsugorō and Heikichi
- Furuhata Ninzaburō (1994) – Yonezawa 8-dan
