= Bandō Mitsugorō VII =

Japanese kabuki actor (1882–1961)

Bandō Mitsugorō VII 七代目 坂東 三津五郎
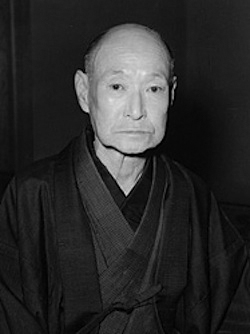
- Born: Jusaku Morita (守田 壽作) (Note: While the stage names of all kabuki actors have retained traditional order (Surname-Givenname) on Wikipedia, birth names of those born after the Meiji Restoration are in Western order (Givenname-Surname).); 21 September 1882; Tokyo, Japan
- Died: 4 November 1961 (aged 79)
- Children: Bandō Mitsugorō VIII (adopted)
- Father: Morita Kan'ya XII

Bandō Mitsugorō VII (Japanese: 七代目 坂東 三津五郎) (September 21, 1882 – November 4, 1961) was a Japanese kabuki actor. He was the adopted father of Bandō Mitsugorō VIII. He was officially designated a living national treasure by the Japanese government. He was a recipient of the Person of Cultural Merit and a member of the Japan Art Academy.
