= Utagawa Kunimasa =

Japanese artist (1773–1810)

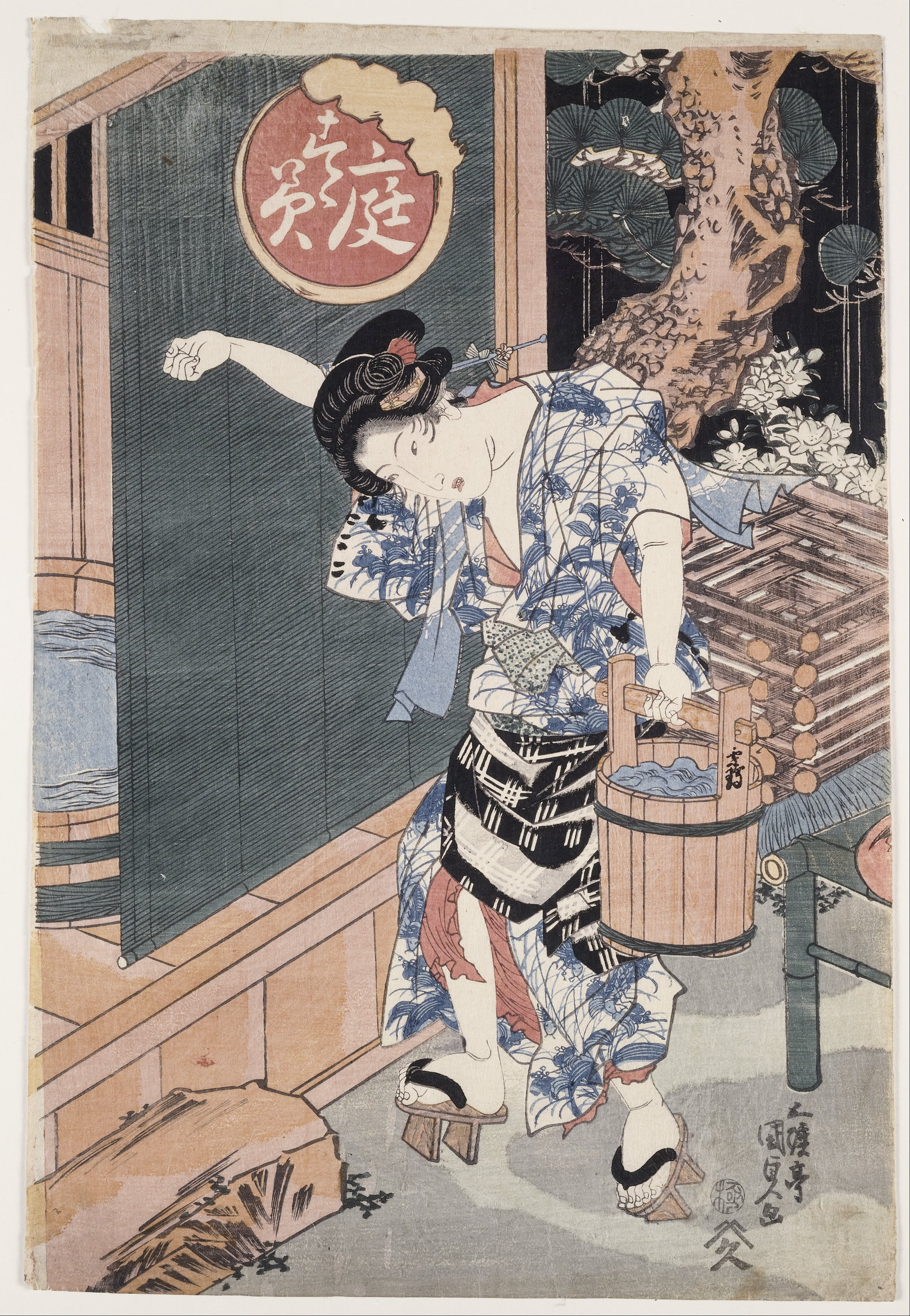
The garden bathtub

Utagawa Kunimasa (歌川 国政; 1773 – December 26, 1810) was a Japanese ukiyo-e artist of the Utagawa school. He was originally from Aizu in Iwashiro Province and first worked in a dye shop after arriving in Edo (modern Tokyo). It was there that he was noticed by Utagawa Toyokuni, to whom he became apprenticed.

Kunimasa was an unusually late developer by ukiyo-e standards: it was only at the end of 1795, at the age of twenty-two, that he began producing exceptional bijinga ichimai-e prints that rivalled those of Utamaro.

Kunimasa is especially known for his yakusha-e portrait prints of kabuki actors, and for his bijin-ga pictures of beautiful women. He is particularly noted for two series of ōkubi-e yakusha-e portraits produced in 1796, one for the publisher Uemura Yohei and the other for Tamariya Zenbei. Richard Lane described his style as striving to "combine the intensity of Sharaku with the decorative pageantry of his master Toyokuni". Those who make such comparison often say he failed to achieve the level of Sharaku's intensity.

In his later career Kunimasa's output as a print designer slowed almost to a halt, as he turned instead to creating masks for kabuki theatre. He died a few years later, on 26 December 1810, at a young age.

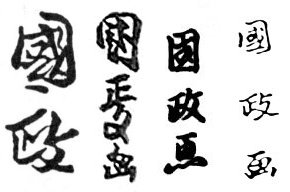
Examples of Kunimasa's signature

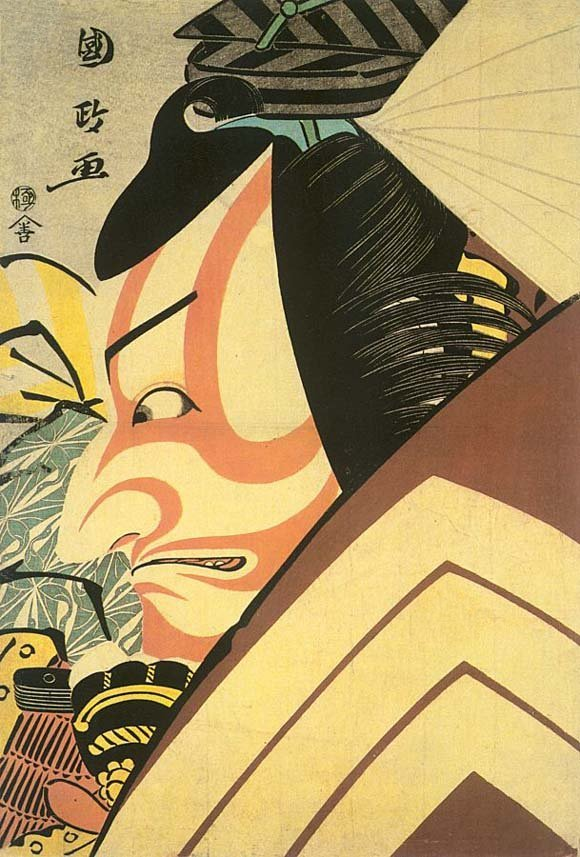
Ichikawa Danjūrō V in Shibaraku

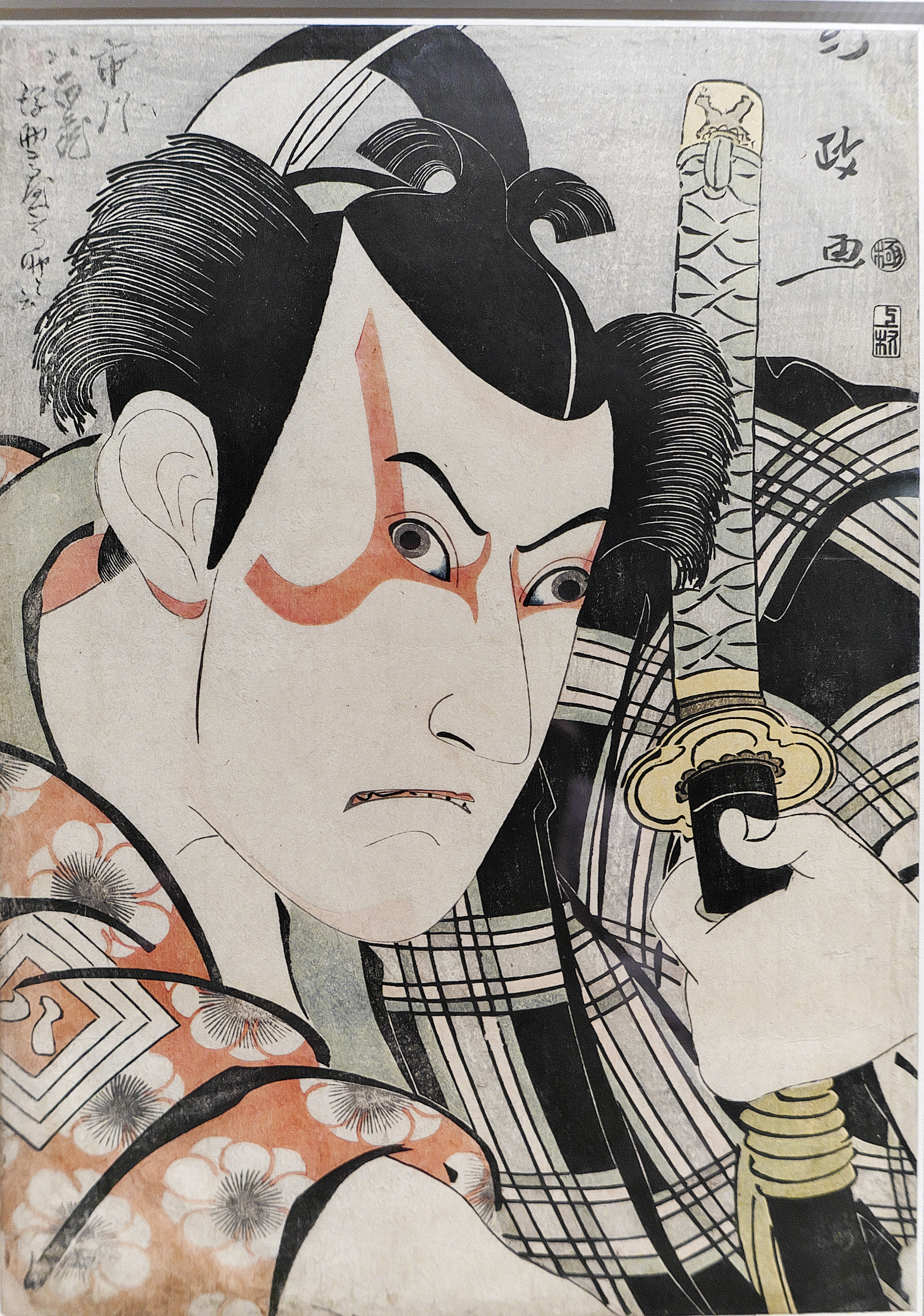
Ichikawa Yaozo III
