= Bandō Shūka I =

Japanese actor

Bandō Shūka I 初代坂東しうか
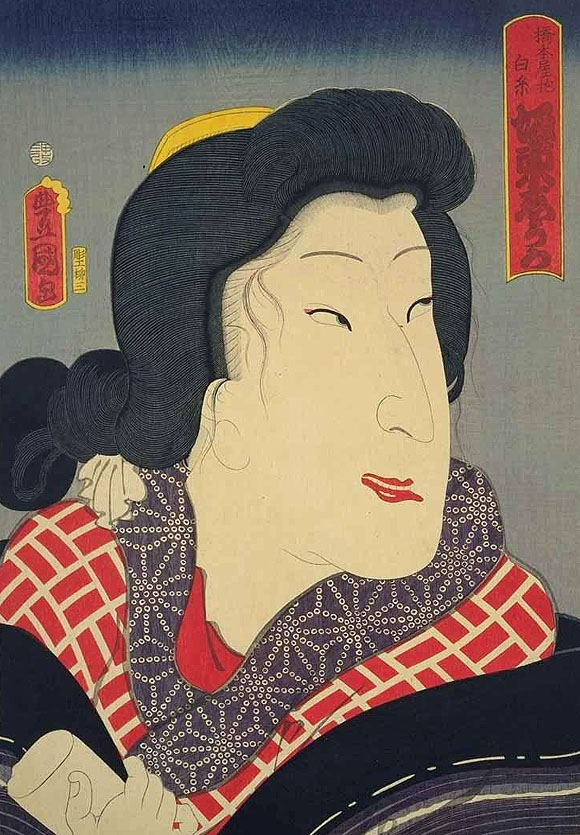
- Bandō Shūka I as Hashimotoya Shiraito, print by Utagawa Toyokuni III, 1860.
- Born: 1813; Edo, Japan
- Died: March 6, 1855 (aged 41–42)
- Other names: Bandō Tamanosuke, Bandō Tamasaburō I, Bandō Mitsugorō V

Bandō Shūka I (初代 坂東 しうか, Shodai Bandō Shūka) (1813 — 6 March 1855), also known as Bandō Tamasaburō I (初代 坂東 玉三郎, Shodai Bandō Tamasaburō), was a Japanese Kabuki actor, and the first in the lineage to hold each of the stage-names Shūka and Tamasaburō.

== Names ==
Like most Kabuki actors, and many artists of the time, Shūka had a number of other names. He first appeared on stage as Bandō Tamanosuke, took the name Bandō Tamasaburō early in his career, and then Shūka later on. He was posthumously given the name Bandō Mitsugorō V (五代目 坂東 三津五郎, Godaime Bandō Mitsugorō), and as a member of the Yamatoya guild throughout his life, would have been called by that name as well (see yagō).

== Lineage ==
As was the case with many Kabuki actors, Shūka was not biologically related to the Bandō family of actors, but rather was adopted into it. His biological father, Tachibanaya Jisuke, was an accounting manager of the Ichimura-za theatre; he was adopted at a very young age by the actor Bandō Mitsugorō III, who raised him as an actor. Shūka's son would be named Bandō Mitsugorō VI, and his adopted son was known as Bandō Minosuke IV.

== Life and career ==
Adopted at a young age by the actor Bandō Mitsugorō III, who gave him the name Tamanosuke, he made his first stage appearance in 1824, at the age of 11, taking the name Bandō Tamasaburō. Six years later, in 1830, after performing on tour in Nagoya and the surrounding area of Kamigata with Bandō Hikosaburō IV, Tamasaburō and Hikosaburō settled in Osaka and began performing regularly at the Naka no Shibai (Central Theatre). Mitsugorō died the following year, however, and so Tamasaburō returned to Edo soon afterwards. In 1839, he took on his father's poetry name (haimyō), Bandō Shūka, in a shūmei (naming ceremony) at the Ichimura-za.

Over the course of his career, Shūka performed in countless plays, and was a celebrated onnagata (actor specializing in female roles) alongside his tachiyaku (actor of male roles) partner, Ichikawa Danjūrō VIII. In 1853, he began performing at the Kawarazaki-za. His final performance was as Kaoyo Gozen and Okaru in the famous Kanadehon Chūshingura, in November the following year. He was posthumously named Bandō Mitsugorō, after his adopted father; the same name was held by his own adopted son for most of his career. As a result, drama historians now consider Shūka and his adopted son to be the fifth and sixth, respectively, to be known as Mitsugorō.

== See also ==
- Actor lineages:
- Bandō Tamasaburō
