= Morita Kanya XII =

Japanese theatre manager

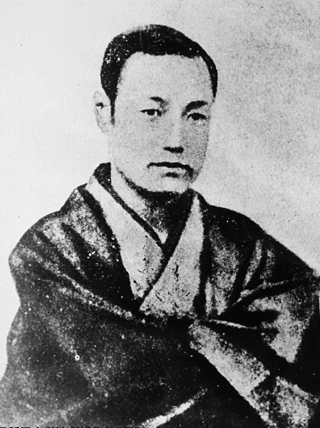
- Born: 9 November 1846
- Died: 21 August 1897 (aged 50)
- Children: Bandō Mitsugorō VII (eldest son); Bandō Tamasaburō III (middle daughter); Morita Kan'ya XIII (youngest son)
- Parent: Nakamura Kanzaemon (father)
- Writing career
- Genre: Kabuki

Morita Kanya XII (十二代目守田勘弥) (9 November 1846 – 21 August 1897) was the leading Japanese theatre manager of the first half of the Meiji period, between 1868 and 1912. He built the first modern theater, the Shintomi-za (新富座), which incorporated Western features such as gaslights and chairs. The theater opened in June 1878, and was located at a foreign settlement in Tsukiji, Tokyo. He was also a crucial factor in attracting the new audience, the aristocracy, into the kabuki theaters (Kikan).

== Early life ==
It is said that as a young boy of 12 years, Morita Kanya XII ran to the port of Yokohama in an attempt to leave Japan and immigrate into the Western world for the sake of fulfilling his goal: becoming a millionaire. Although the Shinsengumi police stopped him that time, his spirit and interest for the West remained an integral part of his personality. During the time of government takeover (1868), the 22-year-old Morita Kanya XII became so obsessed with the Western world that he would eat sashimi (a traditional Japanese dish) with salt and pepper as opposed to soy sauce and wasabi.

== Personal life ==
Kanya was friends with the father of the playwright Okamoto Kido. According to Kido he was extremely polite, almost obsequious, and in his very Westernised way on one occasion brought a gift of a box of Western sweets to Kido's home which had been bought from a sweet shop Fūgetsudo (風月堂). When residents of the British Legation headed up by Thomas McClatchie presented Kanya with a theatre curtain times were uncertain with an undercurrent of anti Western sentiment amongst some feudal domains. There was an exchange of letters between Kanya, McClatchie and an Austro-Hungarian diplomat, Heinrich Von Siebold about the curtain and an invitation from Kanya to a special inaugural event.

I am writing this letter to say that, as a consequence of the rebuild, I would like to extend an honourable invitation to you two young foreign residents in Tōkyō to the occasion of the opening of the Shintomiza on 7th June 1879 and to offer you, along with my fellow countrymen, our hospitality at an august speech welcoming you and an expression of appreciation. Furthermore, as regards to the matter in question, I will measure the time until your kind response to this request. Once it has been presented I will, on receiving the gift of this superb curtain, be hanging it to serve in a place of honour. I trust that this will be to our mutual satisfaction. On a separate note this curtain, the appearance of which more than meets expectations, will encourage those whose names will appear on the certificate of the impending gift to agree. On this the appeal of this proposal will be supported. Yours sincerely, 3rd February 1879, in Tōkyō to ASAP Hospitality Company, Heinrich Von Siebold, and Thomas McClatchie from the head of the Tōkyō Shintomiza, Morita Kan’ya the younger

To which McClatchie replied...

I am coming to Japan to attend the upcoming occasion. I respectfully advise caution as it may be dangerous to be associated with me my friends. In Japan people like the so called rōnin with their katana swords have long been in armed factions. Foreigners seen by them are immediately killed. I am pleased to be able to travel in Japan about which my mother has stopped crying. Coming to watch it’s not my intention to be beheaded by rōnin. The theatre is very pretty and we will be watching a beautiful play. It’s so pleasant don’t you agree? I respectfully ask that I be provided with the details to be written and sent to me care of my friend the mother of Great Britain (Queen Victoria)

Kanya replied...

I read your gracious letter in response to all the invitations sent for which I would like to thank you for confirming that you will be a guest in on the said occasion in June. Such a magnificent set of stage curtains that you have so kindly and honourably given I received with humble thanks. As for the matter in question, the occasion of this inauguration, it will be my honour to organise to the best of my ability, the better the honour for future generations. After this the illustrations will be seen in Ōsaka where all the separate designs will be displayed. With all due respect to you my three noble friends then you will be received with appropriate speeches of thanks and honour. I will measure the time preciously until your response for this article with the family crest which will in the named theatre be honoured. Respectfully, yours sincerely.4th February, Morita Kan’ya

(Skingle)

== The Kabuki reforms ==
The Kabuki theater was greatly affected during the reforms of the Meiji period. The main concern of the government was to transform the art of Kabuki into something similar to that of the western form. This placed theater from a common into a high social role, in which aristocrats and nobles would come and view the performances. Kabuki was to represent a civilized Japan (mostly for the sake of impressing westerners). In 1872, Kabuki leaders, including Morita Kanya XII were asked to participate in a discussion at the Tokyo city hall. There, the changes were addressed and Morita Kanya XII saw this as an opportunity to become a wealthy businessman with the hope to become the director of the future National Theatre of Japan. When he built his Shintomi-za he implemented the desired reforms, which later were referred to as "engeki kairyo." (Tschudin)

== Career ==
Morita Kanya was the owner of one of the three theatres licensed under the Tokugawa shogun regime: the Morita-za. Following the government takeover in 1868, Morita Kanya built the Morita-za in 1872, which marked a transformation of the Japanese Kabuki theater structure. In 1875, he had financial difficulties and reorganized the Morita-za into a company, which changed the theater's name to Shintomi-za. A year later in 1876, the theater burned down, but Morita Kanya immediately rebuilt after its destruction. In 1878 it was completed and named Shintomi-za. (Yuichiro) The grand reopening ceremony took place on 7 June 1878 attended by the then Chief Minister Prince Sanjō Sanetomi (三条 実美). (Skingle) The Shintomi-za was furnished with Western chairs designed for Western visitors and gas lighting for the stage. A member of the British Legation in Tōkyō, Thomas Russell Hillier McClatchie, attended the opening ceremony and by all accounts he thoroughly enjoyed watching the opening night performances and later wrote to his mother and friends about it. Okamoto Keinosuke (later Kiyoshi - father of playwright Okamoto Kido - 岡本 綺堂)and friend of Morita Kanya, employed at the time as an interpreter at the British Legation, helped McClatchie to design a gift from the foreign residents for Shintomiza and on 3 February 1879, the theatre was presented with a curtain made from purple satin with intricate pine, bamboo and plum designs and Morita Kanya's katabami emblem. Morita was overjoyed and hung the curtain for the March performances which began on 28 February. (Skingle) The climax of Morita Kanya XII's career was in June 1879 when foreign aristocrat Crown Prince Heinrich of Germany and on 16 July 1879 U.S. President Ulysses Grant came to the Shintomi-za and was treated to a performance of Yoshi-iye. (Brandon) All of these changes transformed Shintomi-za into Japan's "national theatre", although it was not referred to as such.

== Influence on Kabuki ==
=== Elimination of thrust stage ===
During the heyday of Kabuki in the Edo period (1603–1868), the relationship between actor and audience was supposed to be strong and intimate. This meant that it was common for actors to interact with its audience. For instance, in the midst of the performance, the actors would come onto the "thrust stage" (a stage that extends into the audience) and interact with them. Morita Kanya XII with his attempt to transform kKabuki into a more respectable art form eliminated the thrust stage, thereby adhering to a western convention. This ended the relationship between actor and audience. (Samuel L. Leiter, ed., A Kabuki Reader (Armonk, NY: M.E. Sharpe, 2002))

=== Reform of Kabuki plays ===
In 1878, Morita Kanya XII, following the government's demand for historical accuracy, produced the play "Okige no Kumo Harau Asagochi" which was based on a real recent uprising. He also integrated elements of "good" morale into the dialogues of his actors, with the goal to civilize the commoners (Yuichiro). He also westernized some plays to appeal to western visitors. For instance, he wrote two Kabuki plays set in Europe in 1879. At another instance he would hire a play writer to create a play based on the General Grant's victories in the American Civil War. (Brandon)

=== Changes in architecture and furniture ===
The use of Western chairs for the audience, now standard in all Japanese theatres, was introduced in Kanya's Shintomi-za. The size of the stage, which remained the same for over a century, was also enlarged when Morita Kanya XII built the Shintomi-za. (Yuichiro)

== Later life ==
In 1894, Morita Kanya XII was forced to give up his theater management duty. He had a major financial crisis in which he lost 20,000 yen in the production of the play Hyoryu Kidan Seiyo-geki, which turned out to be very unsuccessful due to the poor acting of Western performers (Yuichiro). In 1909, the Shintonomi-za was bought by Shochiku.

The last time Okamoto Kido and his father saw him was at the Bairin Tea House at the Kabukiza in Meiji 29 (1896) when they attended Ichikawa Danjūrō IX's revival performance of 'Shibaraku' (Wait a Minute), and 'Sukeroku'. At the time, according to Okamoto Kido's father, he had debts of ¥700,000 - ¥800,000 in 2011 values about ¥2,250,000,000 - ¥2,570,000,000, equal to about £14.5 – £15 Million or $22.25 – $22.5 million. He died on 21 August Meiji 30 (1897) at his home on Akasaka District's Nakano-chō (Skingle)

== Sources ==
- Kikan, Kimura, Morita Kanya (Tokyo: Shintaishū-sha, 1943).
- Brandon, James, "Kabuki and Shakespeare, Balancing Yin and Yang,"
- Tschudin, Jean-Jacques, "Danjuro's katsureki-geki (realistic theatre) and the Meiji 'theatre reform' movement'," Japan Forum 11 no. 1 (1991).
- Yuichiro, Takahashi, "Kabuki Goes Official: The 1878 Opening of the Shintomi-za," The Drama Review 39 no. 10 (1995).
