= Bandō Mitsugorō IX =

Japanese kabuki actor (1929–1999)

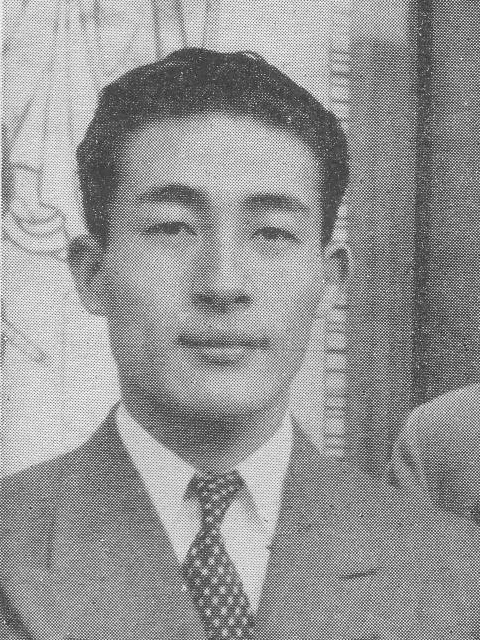
- Bandō Mitsugorō IX in 1951
- Born: Mitsunobu Morita; May 14, 1929; Tokyo, Japan
- Died: April 1, 1999 (aged 69); Japan
- Occupation(s): Kabuki actor, Japanese dance artist
- Years active: 1933–1999
- Spouse: Yoshiko (daughter of Bandō Mitsugorō VIII)
- Children: Bandō Mitsugorō X (Yasosuke Bandō)
- Parent: Bandō Hidechō III (father)
- Relatives: Bandō Mitsugorō VIII (father-in-law); Ichikawa Kōmaizō X (elder brother)

Bandō Mitsugorō IX (Japanese: 九代目 坂東 三津五郎, romanized: Kudaime Bandō Mitsugorō, born Mitsunobu Morita (守田光伸, Morita Mitsunobu), May 14, 1929 – April 1, 1999) was a Kabuki actor and Japanese dance artist. He was the son-in-law of Bandō Mitsugorō VIII and the father of Bandō Mitsugorō X. He was married to Bandō Mitsugorō VIII's eldest daughter, Yoshiko, in 1955. He took his stage name after the death of his father-in-law in 1975.

== Early life and training ==
Bandō Mitsugorō IX was born as the third son of Bandō Hidechō III. His elder brother was Ichikawa Kōmaizō X. After his father died early, he became a pupil of Onoe Kikugorō VI. After Kikugorō's death in 1949, he continued his studies under Kikugorō's disciple, Onoe Shōroku II.

He made his first stage appearance in November 1933 at the Shin-Kabukiza (Shinjuku Daiichi Gekijō) in the play Shigure no Kotatsu, performing the role of Kantarō under the stage name Bandō Mitsunobu.

== Career ==
Following his marriage to Yoshiko, the eldest daughter of Bandō Mitsugorō VIII, in 1955, he was adopted into the Bandō family and took the stage name Bandō Yasosuke IV. In September 1962, he became Bandō Minosuke VII, and in September 1987, he succeeded to the name Bandō Mitsugorō IX.

As head of the Bandō school of Japanese dance, he organized the "Tōbu no Kai" (登舞の会) dance recitals and worked to preserve traditional dance forms. He was designated as a member of the Traditional Kabuki Preservation Society in 1965.

== Recognition ==
Bandō Mitsugorō IX received the Japan Art Academy Prize in 1991 and the Purple Ribbon Medal in 1993.

== Death and succession ==
Bandō Mitsugorō IX died on April 1, 1999, at the age of 69. Following his death, his son Yasosuke Bandō succeeded to the stage name Bandō Mitsugorō X in 2001, two years after his father's death. The succession ceremony was celebrated at the Kabukiza Theater in Tokyo in 2001.

== Filmography ==
- Akō Rōshi (1964)
- Minamoto no Yoshitsune (1966)
