= Ichikawa Danjūrō V =

18th-century Japanese Kabuki actor

Ichikawa Danjūrō V 五代目市川団十郎
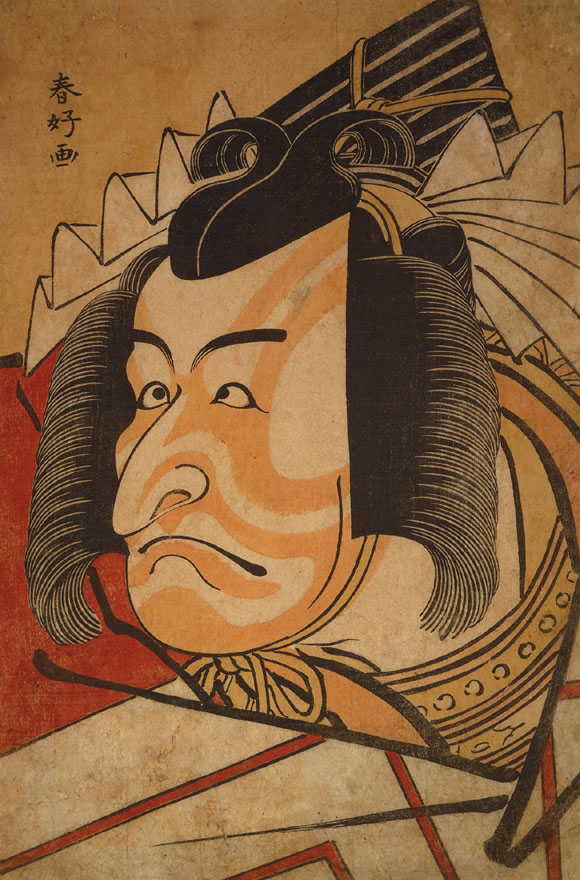
- Ichikawa playing the hero role of the bombastic "Shibaraku" scene; Katsukawa Shunkō, c. 1788–1791
- Born: August 1741; Edo, Japan
- Died: 29 October 1806; Mukōjima, Japan
- Other names: Ichikawa Hakuen I, Ichikawa Ebizō, Matsumoto Kōshirō III, Matsumoto Kōzō, Matsumoto Umimaru, and Naritaya Shichizaemon (I)

Ichikawa Danjūrō V (五代目 市川 團十郎, Godaime Ichikawa Danjūrō; August 1741 – 29 October 1806) also known as Ichikawa Ebizō (市川 海老蔵), was one of the most famous and popular Japanese Kabuki actors of all time. Throughout his career, Danjūrō would hold some of the highest ranks in the hyōbanki, an annual Edo publications which evaluated actors and performances. At one point in 1782, he was even granted the rank of tōji-muri-hiiki (当時無理贔屓, "the favorite unequaled in those days").

He is depicted in countless ukiyo-e actor prints (yakusha-e), and unlike many actors who focus on one type of role, Danjūrō excelled at many types of roles, playing heroes, villains, samurai, peasants, and beautiful women with equal skill. One of his most famous roles is that of the hero in Shibaraku, a scene contained within full plays.

== Names ==
Like most kabuki actors, and many artists, of his time, Danjūrō had a number of names. He was the fifth to be called Ichikawa Danjūrō, and though not the first to be known as Ichikawa Ebizō, he used different kanji (characters) than his predecessors in writing the name. He was a member of the guilds Naritaya and Kōraiya, and could be referred to by these names (see yagō). Other names he used on stage include Ichikawa Hakuen I, Matsumoto Kōshirō III, Matsumoto Kōzō, Matsumoto Umimaru, and Naritaya Shichizaemon (I). In poetry circles, he often used the names Baidō, Omegawa, Sanshō, and Hakuen.

== Lineage ==
He was the fifth in the line of Ichikawa Danjūrō, his father, grandfather, and great-grandfather being the fourth, second, and first in the line respectively (his father and grandfather were also known as Ebizō II and III). He had a son, named Momotarō, who died at a very young age, but Danjūrō also adopted a son who would succeed him and become Ichikawa Danjūrō VI. Danjūrō VII and IX were his grandsons.

== Life and career ==
The actor who would later be known as Ichikawa Danjūrō V was born in Edo (now Tokyo) in August 1741, and appeared on stage for the first time at the age of four. His first role in a play was in 1754, at the age of thirteen, in Miura no Ōsuke Bumon no Kotobuki at the Nakamura-za in Edo. Until 1770, his stage name was Matsumoto Kōshirō (III).

In 1760, the Nakamura-za and Ichimura-za theaters were destroyed by a fire, called the Akashiya fire after the shop where it began, which claimed a fair portion of the city as well. Kōshirō aided in the reconstruction of the theaters, and performed at the Ichimura-za the following month. Like all Kabuki actors, Kōshirō would devote his life almost exclusively to the theater. By the age of 29, he had performed in at least 35 plays, quite possibly many more. In November 1770, Kōshirō, aged 29, took part in a grand naming ceremony (襲名, shūmei) at the Nakamura-za and took the name Ichikawa Danjūrō. This was followed by a performance of Nue no Mori Ichiyō no Mato, in which Danjūrō would perform the lead role of Shibaraku for the first time. This role was nearly always played by a member of the Ichikawa Danjūrō line, and it would become one of Danjūrō V's most famous roles.

The following year, Danjūrō became the head (座頭, zagashira) of the Morita-za troupe and left the Nakamura-za, where his father still performed. He would return to the Nakamura-za in 1773, but left it again the following year along with a number of other actors, returning once more to the Morita-za. Danjūrō's son Momotarō, born in 1768, died in 1776 at the age of eight. Danjūrō began performing at the Ichimura-za, leaving the Morita-za again. At this point, according to the book Yakusha Sensakuron (役者詮索論, "About Actors Prying"), he was living in the town of Sakai in Sumiyoshi district, and earning 800 ryō a year.

August 1778 marks another major event in Danjūrō's life, and the kabuki world as a whole. As a result of Danjūrō's growing influence among patrons and within other elements of the kabuki world, it created enmities among a number of other actors. Accused of misappropriation of funds, Danjūrō was forced to give up his name to another actor, Matsumoto Kōshirō IV, and to take on the name Ichikawa Ebizō for himself. After showing his anger on stage, and accusing Matsumoto Kōshirō IV and Iwai Hanshirō IV in public of plotting against him, Danjūrō was forced to leave the stage for a time. Though he returned to performing three months later at the Morita-za, Danjūrō would not return to the Nakamura-za for a full year. In November 1779, he did so and became troupe head (zagashira). Seven years later, Kōshirō IV would join Danjūrō in performing at the Kiri-za, and reconcile the dispute.

Danjūrō formally took on the name Ebizō at a ceremony at the Ichimura-za in 1791. However, in writing "Ebizō" he chose different kanji (characters) from those used by his father and grandfather. Ebizō had formerly been written as "海老蔵", but the new Ebizō would instead use "鰕蔵". Five years later, Ebizō announced his retirement; he was 55. He took on the name Naritaya Shichiemon and moved to a small hut on the tiny island of Ujishima, near Mukōjima. The following month, the hyōbanki would give his rank as sanga no tsu murui-dai-shigoku-jô-jô-kichi-murui (山河の津無類大至極上々吉無類, "Unequaled in the Three Capitals - grand - exceedingly - superior - superior - excellent).

He returned to the stage shortly after the death of his adopted son, Ichikawa Danjūrō VI, in 1799, taking on the name Ichikawa Hakuen. His definitively final performance, after countless performances in an incredible variety of roles and at a number of theaters, would be in March 1802, at the Kawarazaki-za. Ichikawa Hakuen died in October 1806, in his small hut on Mukōjima.

He had many disciples, including Matsumoto Kōshirō IV, Ichikawa Omezō I, Ichikawa Tatsuzō I (Hanai Saizaburō IV), Ichikawa Mitsuzō (Nakamura Matsue II), Ichikawa Takizō, Ichikawa Hamazō, Ichikawa Tomiemon, and Ichikawa Kosanza.

== See also ==
The Ichikawa family crest (mon)

- Shūmei

== Sources ==
- Ichikawa Danjūrō V at Kabuki21.com. Accessed 6 September 2006.
