= Kumadori =

Stage makeup worn by Japanese kabuki actors

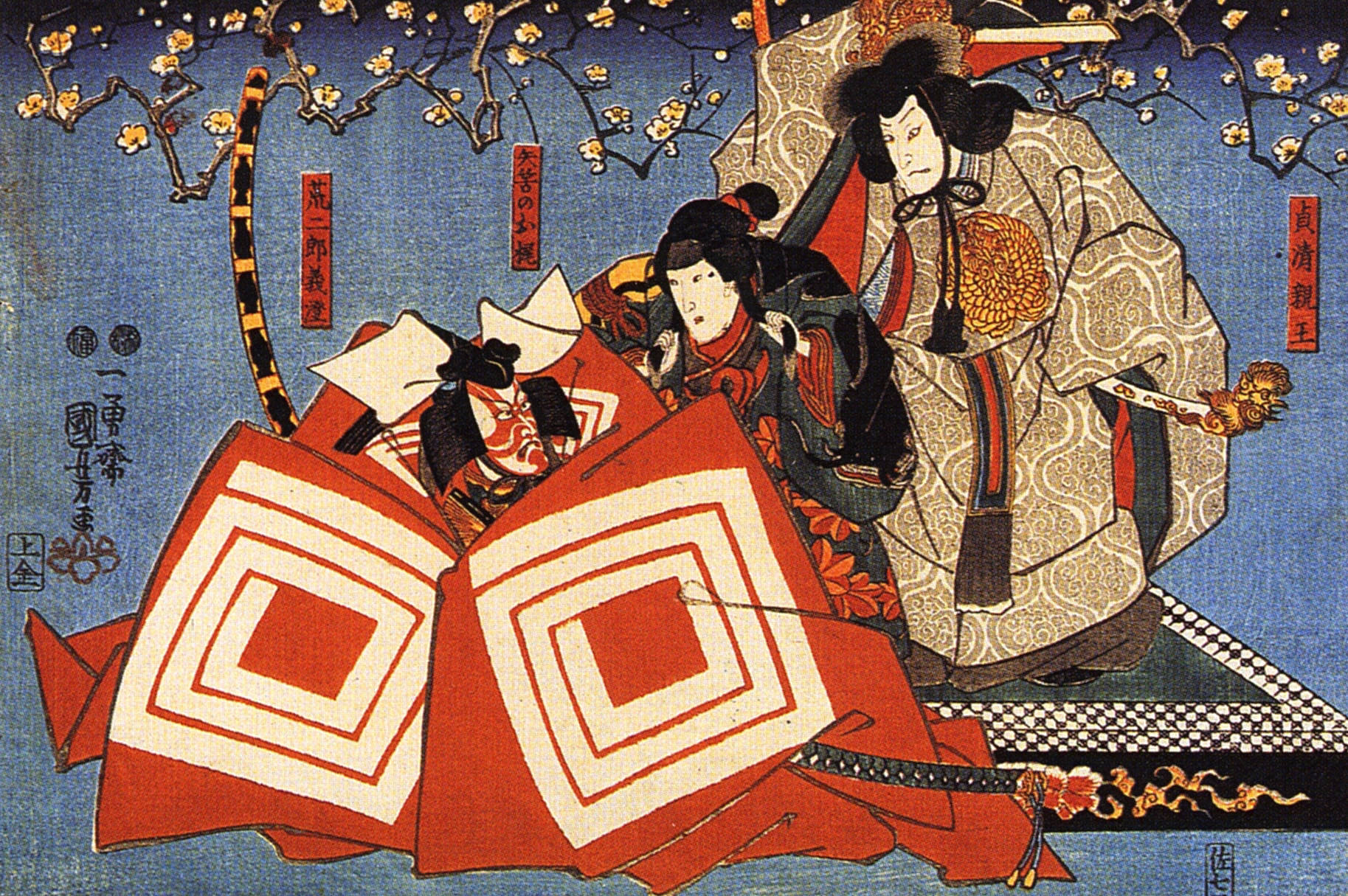
The hero of Shibaraku wearing kumadori makeup. Print by Utagawa Kuniyoshi

Kumadori (隈取) is the stage makeup worn by kabuki actors, mostly when performing kabuki plays in the aragoto style. The term also applies to a painting method in which two brushes are used simultaneously, one for the color and the other used to create shading or other details.

Kumadori makeup generally consists of brightly coloured stripes or patterns over a white foundation, the colours and patterns symbolising aspects of the character. Though kumadori was originated and developed extensively by members of the Ichikawa Danjūrō family of actors, some conventions are creations of the Onoe Kikugorō line.

== Colours ==
Only a few colours are used in kumadori makeup; red, blue, brown and black. Whilst black is simply used to exaggerate features, such as eyebrows and the line of the mouth, the other colours are used to tell the audience about the character's nature.

Red kumadori indicates a powerful hero role, often a character with virtue and courage. The most famous role to use red kumadori is that of the hero in Shibaraku, Kamakura Gongoro, and has come to stereotypically represent kabuki in the West.

Blue makeup is used to represent a villain, human or not, and represents negative emotions such as fear and jealousy. Ghosts in traditional Japanese dramas are often trapped by their attachment to such emotions, and so often wear blue makeup; kitsune (fox spirits) such as Genkurō in Yoshitsune Senbon Zakura wear blue makeup as well.

Brown represents monsters and non-human spirits, such as oni (demons). One example of the usage of brown kumadori is the tsuchigumo (ground spider) fought by Minamoto no Raikō in Tsuchigumo Soushi.

== Patterns ==
Though only four colours are used, there are over 50 different patterns of kumadori. Kumadori is worn symmetrically on both sides. Some patterns are used for a number of roles, as they have come to represent a specific type of character over time, regardless of the play being performed:

- Ni-hon-Guma (ニ本隈, two lines) - this style of kumadori features two red lines leading up into the hairline, one leading off the eyebrows and one leading off the eyeline. This pattern is used to express quiet strength in heroes.
- Suji-Guma (筋隈) - the most well-known pattern of red kumadori, as seen in Shibaraku on the hero Kamakura Gongoro. Its dramatic red lines represent the power and righteous anger of the character.
- Mukimi Kuma (むきみ隈) - a stylish form of red kumadori used for young, handsome and virtuous heroes. The character of Sukeroku in Sukeroku Yukari no Edo Zakura wears mukimi kuma kumadori, and is the epitome of a handsome kabuki hero attempting to win the love of a high-ranking courtesan.
- Zare-Guma (ざれ隈, "playful" kumadori) - the style of kumadori used for comic villains; though the kumadori is red, the lines used make the character look like an animal, indicating that they should not be taken seriously. Some forms of zare-guma make the character look like a monkey, or a crab.
- Kuge Kuma (公家, court aristocrat) - a dramatic form of blue kumadori used to indicate a villainous imperial court aristocrat looking to overthrow those in power. The design used is very similar to that of suji-guma.

An impression of a kabuki actor's face make-up, preserved on a piece of cloth, is known as an oshiguma.
