= Morita Kan'ya XIV =

Japanese actor

- 十四代目 守田 勘弥
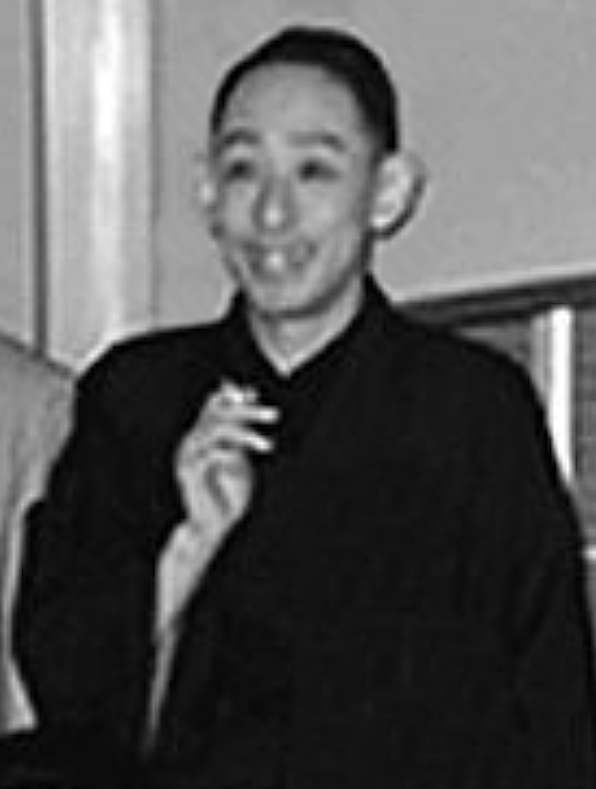
- Born: Yoshiyuki Morita; March 8, 1907; Tokyo, Japan
- Died: March 28, 1975 (aged 68)
- Other names: Bandō Shūka III, Bandō Tamasaburō IV, Kinoji-ya
- Father: Morita Kan'ya XIII
- Relatives: Morita Kan'ya XII (grandfather); Morita Kin'ya (son); Bandō Tamasaburō V (adopted son)

Morita Kan'ya XIV (十四代目 守田 勘弥, Jūyondaime Morita Kan'ya; 8 March 1907-28 March 1975) was a Japanese kabuki actor. He was a tachiyaku actor (performer of male roles), specializing in playing the roles of young, handsome lovers in the wagoto style, a type of role known as nimaime. Kan'ya is also known for his early postwar film career, and as the adoptive father of Bandō Tamasaburō V, the most famous and popular onnagata (specialist in female roles) of today.

== Lineage ==
Kan'ya was the fourteenth in the line of actors and theatre managers to hold the name Morita Kan'ya. Previous bearers of the name were managers (zamoto) of the Morita-za kabuki theatre in Edo (later Tokyo) until 1894.

Kan'ya was adopted by Morita Kan'ya XIII, and in turn was the adoptive father of Bandō Tamasaburō V.

== Life and career ==
Kan'ya made his first appearance onstage at the age of seven, at the Kabuki-za in Tokyo, under the stagename Bandō Tamasaburō IV. He would later take the name Bandō Shūka III and, following the death of his adoptive father in 1932, became Morita Kan'ya XIV in 1935. He was, like most kabuki actors, quite prolific, and for a number of years in the 1930s was a member of a group of young actors called "Seinen Kabuki" (Young men Kabuki) who performed regularly at the Shin Kabuki-za in Tokyo, then called the Shinjuku Daiichi Gekijō (First Shinjuku Theatre).

In the early postwar years, Kan'ya acted in a number of films, including Surōnin Makaritōru (1947), Otomi to Yosaburō (1950), and Edo no Hanamichi (1953).

Remaining quite active on the kabuki stage as well, Kan'ya performed in many revivals at the National Theatre, taking part as well in the Theatre's 1966 opening ceremonies and the associated performance of Sugawara Denju Tenarai Kagami. He also often performed alongside his adopted son Bandō Tamasaburō V.

Kan'ya made his last Tokyo stage appearance in December 1974, in a production of Kanadehon Chūshingura at the National Theatre, and his final stage appearance the following month, at Nagoya's Chunichi Theatre. He died on 28 March 1975.
