= Bandō Mitsugorō VIII =

Japanese actor (1906–1975)

Bandō Mitsugorō VIII 八代目坂東三津五郎
- Born: Toshirō Morita (守田 俊郎) (Note: While the stage names of all kabuki actors have retained traditional order (Surname-Givenname) on Wikipedia, birth names of those born after the Meiji Restoration are in Western order (Givenname-Surname).); 19 October 1906; Taitō-ku, Tokyo, Japan
- Died: 16 January 1975 (aged 68); Kyoto, Japan
- Other names: Bandō Yososuke III, Bandō Minosuke VI, Yamatoya

Bandō Mitsugorō VIII (八代目 坂東 三津五郎, Hachidaime Bandō Mitsugorō) (Note: Bandō's name, being a stage name, is rendered in traditional order, not Western name order.) (19 October 1906 – 16 January 1975) was one of Japan's most revered kabuki actors from the 1930s until his death. He was a renowned tachiyaku and katakiyaku, specializing in particular in the aragoto style. He was officially designated as a "Living National Treasure" by the Japanese government in 1973.

== Lineage ==
8th in the line of Bandō Mitsugorō, he was adopted by Bandō Mitsugorō VII; his son and grandson would go on to take the name as well, becoming ninth and tenth in the line respectively.

== Early life ==
Bandō made his stage debut at the age of 7 in 1913 as Bandō Yososuke III. He would take the name Minosuke VI in 1928, at the Meiji-za theatre.

== Career ==
Bandō later tried to adapt The Tale of Genji to the stage, but was prohibited from doing so by the authorities. After a few years in a kabuki troupe run by the Toho company, he moved to Kansai; he lived there for nearly 20 years, performing in Osaka and other venues, and taking part in the final performances at the Ōsaka Kabuki-za, which closed and became a department store in 1958.

In 1962, following his return to Tokyo, and the death of his adopted father Bandō Mitsugorō VII, Bandō celebrated a shūmei (naming ceremony) alongside his son-in-law, Bandō Mitsugorō IX, and grandson, Bandō Mitsugorō X, taking the name Mitsugorō VIII himself. Four years later, he performed at the opening ceremonies for Tokyo's National Theater.

He performed as Kakogawa Honzō in Kanadehon Chūshingura (The Tale of the 47 Ronin) in December 1974 at the National Theater. This was among his final performances, as he died the following month at age 68.

== Death ==
In January 1975, Bandō visited a Kyoto restaurant with friends and ordered four portions of fugu kimo, or puffer fish liver. The liver is one of the most toxic parts of the fish, and its sale was prohibited by local ordinances (it was banned nationally in 1984). Claiming that he could survive the fish's poison, he ate the livers and died following eight hours of gradual paralysis and breathing difficulties.
