= Hyōbanki =

Historic Japanese rating lists of entertainers

Hyōbanki (評判記) were compilations of rankings and critiques of kabuki actors and courtesans published in Edo period Japan. They were generally published at the new year in Edo and Kamigata, reviewing and ranking the courtesans and actors of the previous year. Along with ukiyo-e woodblock prints and other publications, hyōbanki were important elements in the urban popular culture of the period.

== Description ==
A book called yarō hyōbanki was published in 1656, though many scholars consider the 1687 yakusha hyōbanki to be the first in the form. These were published regularly until 1890.

Actors were ranked according to a fairly simple scale:

- Jō-jō-kichi (上々吉) Upper-upper-excellent
- Jō-jō (上々) Upper-upper
- Jō (上) Upper
- Naka no jō-jō (中の上々) Upper-upper of the Middle
- Naka no jō (中の上) Upper of the Middle
- Naka (中) Middle

In print, variations were used to represent intermediate ranks between Jō-jō and Jō-jō-kichi. Sometimes only parts of the kanji (character) for "kichi" (吉) would be written in, each stroke towards completing the character representing an intermediate rank. Other times, strokes would be written in outline instead of ink-filled, to represent intermediate rankings not yet achieved.

At times, ranks above jō-jō-kichi were added, to describe and rank the greatest kabuki actors.

- Dai-shigoku-jō-jō-kichi (大至極上々吉) Great exceedingly upper-upper-excellent
- Kō-goku-jō-jō-kichi (高極上々吉) Higher very upper-upper-excellent
- Shigoku-jō-jō-kichi (至極上々吉) Exceedingly upper-upper-excellent
- Goku-jō-jō-kichi (極上々吉) Very upper-upper-excellent
- Kō-jō-jō-kichi (高上々吉) Higher upper-upper-excellent
- Dai-jō-jō-kichi (大上々吉) Great upper-upper-excellent
- Shi-jō-jō-kichi (至上々吉) Climax of upper-upper-excellent
