= Shibaraku =

Play in the Kabuki repertoire

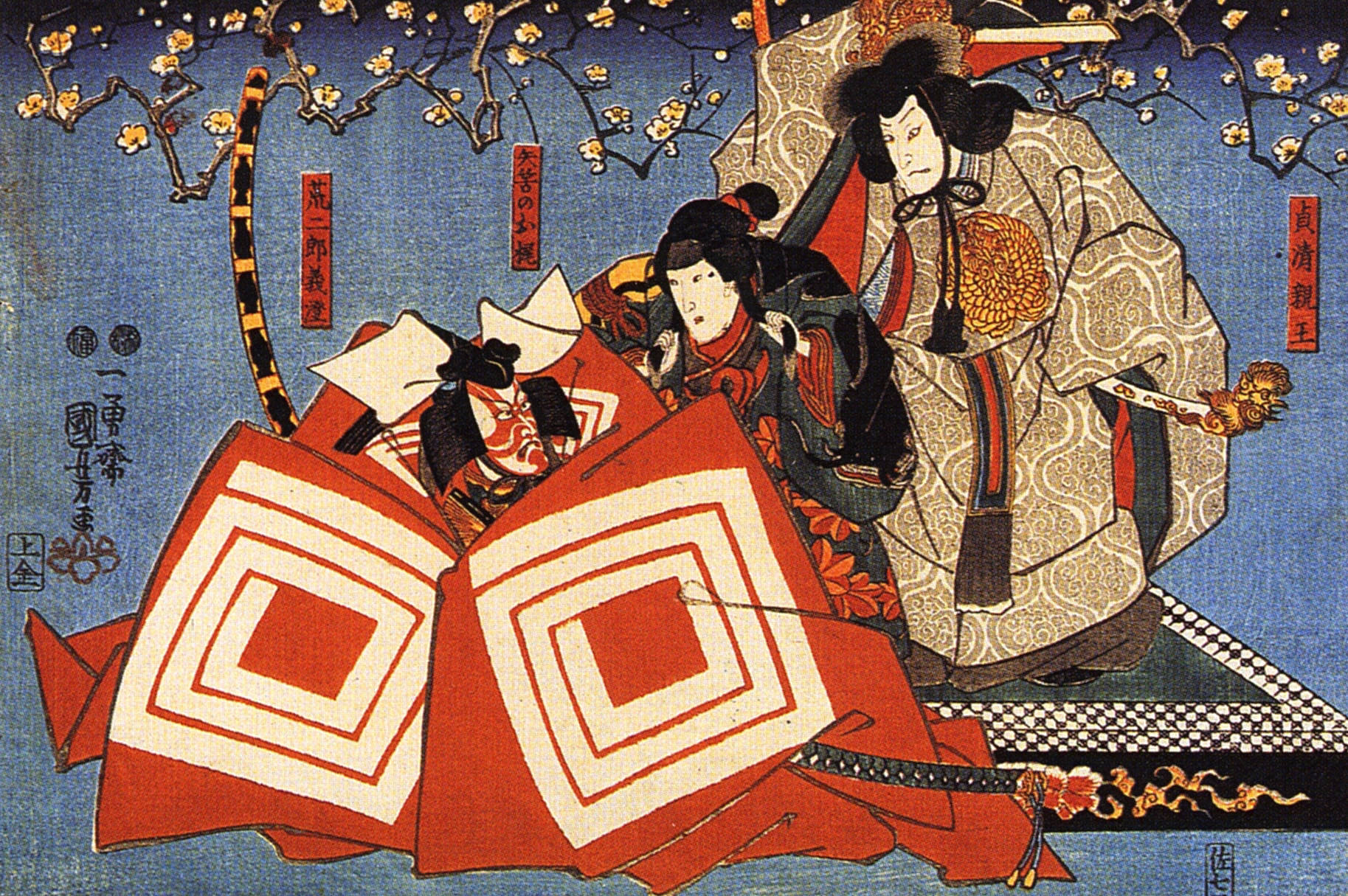
- A Shibaraku scene, Utagawa Kuniyoshi
- Original title: 暫(しばらく)
- Original language: Japanese
- Written by: Ichikawa Danjūrō line
- Characters: Kamakura Gongorō Kagemasa, Kiyohara no Takehira, Prince Kamo Jirō Yoshitsuna, Princess Katsura-no-mae
- Genre: aragoto jidaimono
- Setting: Tsurugaoka Hachimangū, Kamakura

Premiere
- Date: 1697, Nakamura-za, Edo
- Place: Japan

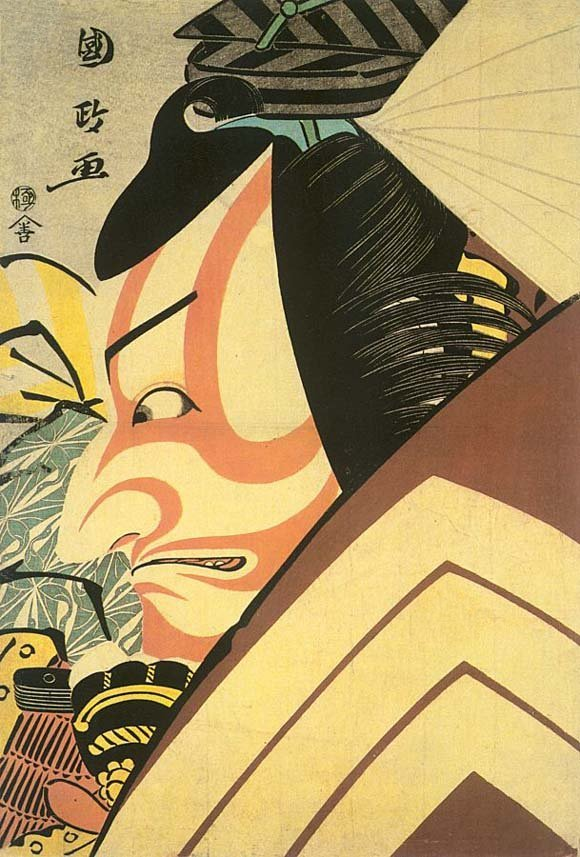
Ichikawa Danjūrō V in the Shibaraku. ukiyo-e, by Utagawa Kunimasa, 1796

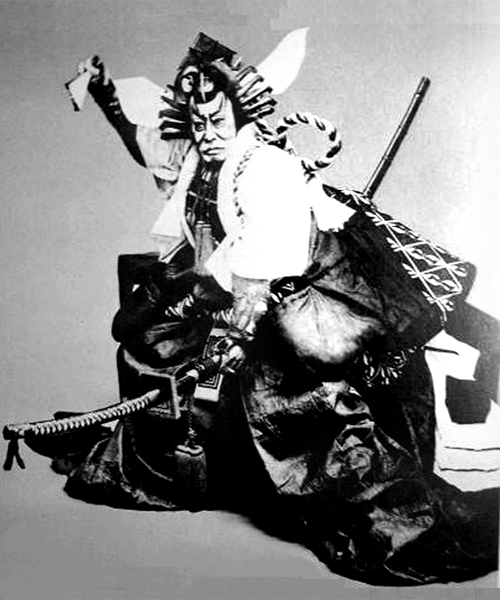
Danjuro Ichikawa IX as Kamakura Gongoro Kagemasa in the November 1895 production of Shibaraku

Shibaraku (Japanese: 暫(しばらく); lit. 'Just a Moment!') is a play in the Kabuki repertoire, and one of the celebrated Kabuki Jūhachiban ("Eighteen Great Plays"). The play is noted for its flamboyantly dramatic costumes and makeup (kumadori).

Originally staged by Ichikawa Danjūrō I in 1697 at the Nakamura-za, it was very popular, and quickly began to be included at the annual kaomise celebrations of each theatre in Edo. For a time, the main role was frequently different, depending on the whims of the theatre and the troupe. The piece was standardized somewhat in the early 19th century by Danjūrō VII, and reworked again by Danjūrō IX at the end of that century. This version has been performed since then.

A scene of roughly 50 minutes, Shibaraku is not a play unto itself, but a short drama inserted during interludes or between full plays to provide variety and maintain a certain level of energy and interest on the part of the audience. Today it is played mostly on special occasions, such as to celebrate an actor's name changing ceremony.

== Plot ==
Like in many other kabuki plays, the characters and locations have changed their names several times across the centuries. The modern version of the drama centers around the figure of Kamakura Gongorō Kagemasa, who has become the stereotypical bombastic hero of the kabuki stage, with red-and-white striped makeup and strong, energetic movements; the historical Kamakura Kagemasa is famous for his bravery for having continued to fight after losing an eye in battle in the Gosannen War (1083–1087).

The story is set in front of the Tsuruoka Hachimangu shrine, where an evil aristocrat (his exact identity has changed across the centuries, and in the modern version is the Heian era warlord Kiyohara no Takehira) has usurped power and taken as prisoners several imperial royals, including Prince Kamo Yoshitsuna and the Princess Katsura. One of Takehira's associates, Lady Teruha, tries to persuade him not to execute the prisoners in front of the shrine, as that might enrage the gods.

In response, the evil lord summons, in addition to the four red-faced warriors he already has on his side, an even more powerful and fearless warrior called Narita Gorō. He and the four other warriors perform a haradashi, a dance used to show both the public and the royal prisoners how powerful they are (in a similar fashion to the Haka). Kiyohara orders them to kill the royal family.

Just as they are about to draw their swords to cut off their heads, a tremendous shout of "Shibaraku!" (Just a moment!) can be heard loudly from behind a curtain (agemaku). The hero appears and steps out onto the hanamichi (a raised platform extending through the audience seats to the stage) in a magnificent costume (featuring the sanshō, the three- square symbol of the Naritaya, Ichikawa Danjūrō's acting family) and red striped makeup. Arriving at the stage, he sits on a stool (aibiki) and, in a special kind of monologue called tsurane, tells his story. He claims to possess superhuman strength, and demonstrates this by driving off some of Kiyohara's henchmen only by “shouting” at them with his eyes.

He then walks onto the stage. He accuses the villain of power usurpation and, only by words and without using his strength, he persuades him to return his stolen items, the imperial sword Tomokirimaru and the imperial seal. Lady Teruha, who turns out to be a relative of Gongorō, returns both items to the prince. Showing the illegitimacy of the evil lord's actions, he manages, again only with words, to allow the royal family and their retainers to escape with Teruha.

Gorō orders Takehira's soldiers to attack him one final time. Surrounded, Gongorō draws his giant sword and cuts their heads off with a single blow, and then performs a stunning Mie pose in an intentionally exaggerated scene which shows his superhuman strength. Takehira is definitively defeated and, as the hero leaves the stage and walks through the hanamichi, he can be seen alongside his five warriors raising his hands in a sign of mutual respect for such an incredible warrior.

Now, with the curtain fallen, Gongorō performs a roppō ("flying in six directions", a technique which calls the actor to leave the hanamichi by exaggerating his movements), and leaves the stage, not as the Warrior, but as the actor.

== History ==
The name of the work is derived from an actual occurrence involving Danjūrō I. On this particular occasion, when his fellow actors refused to give him his cue to make his entrance, Danjūrō dramatically shouted "Shibaraku!", and stepped onto the hanamichi, making his entrance.

In 1746 or so, a parody called Onna Shibaraku emerged, which follows the same plot, but with a female role in place of the hero. This piece, too, became standardized, and now follows the form established by Nakamura Shikan V in 1901. The idea of parody is central to the origins, and the nature, of kabuki. This arrangement also allows onnagata, actors devoted to playing female roles, to take part in this most popular of dramatic archetypal stories.
