= Bandō Tamasaburō V =

Japanese kabuki actor, director (1950-)

Bandō Tamasaburō V 五代目坂東玉三郎
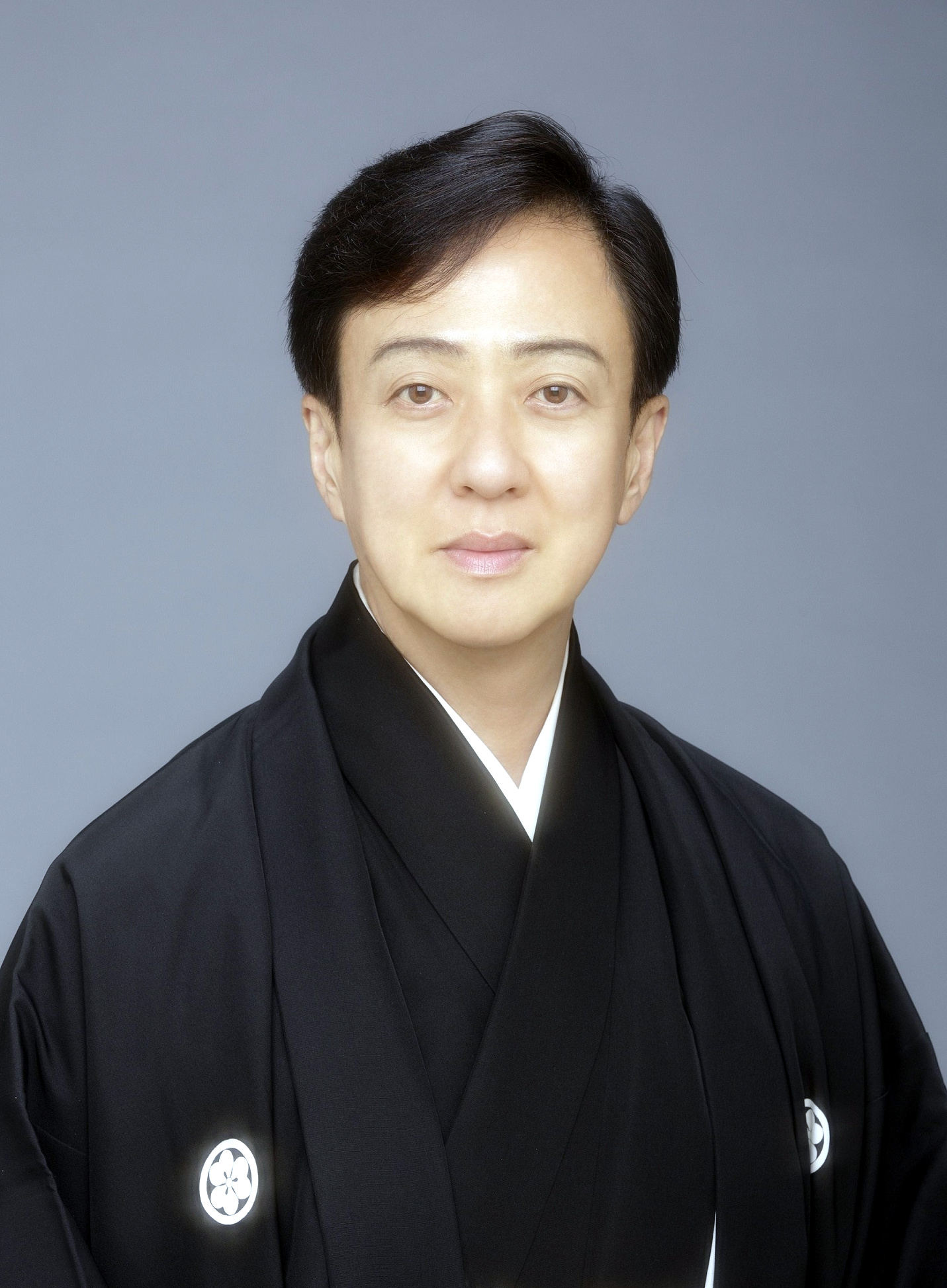
- Bandō Tamasaburō V
- Born: Shin'ichi Morita (Note: While the stage names of all kabuki actors have retained traditional order (Surname-Givenname) on Wikipedia, birth names of those born after the Meiji Restoration are in Western order (Givenname-Surname).); 25 April 1950 (age 76); Tokyo, Japan
- Other names: Bandō Kinoji, Yamatoya
- Father: Morita Kan'ya XIV
- Website: http://www.tamasaburo.co.jp

Bandō Tamasaburō V (五代目 坂東 玉三郎, Godaime Bandō Tamasaburō) (born 25 April 1950) is a Kabuki actor and the most popular and celebrated onnagata (an actor specializing in female roles) currently on stage. He has also acted in several films.

== Life and career ==
Born in 1950, Shin'ichi Morita was adopted by Morita Kan'ya XIV and made his first appearance on stage at the age of seven under the name Bandō Kinoji. At a shūmei (naming ceremony) in 1964, he became the fifth to take the name Bandō Tamasaburō; his adoptive father had been the fourth.

Like all Kabuki actors, Tamasaburō has devoted his life to the theater from a very young age. By 1975, when Morita Kan'ya XIV died, Tamasaburō had already performed in countless plays, many of them alongside his adoptive father and other noteworthy actors such as Ichikawa Danjūrō XII. Since then, he has continued to perform not only in numerous plays at the Kabuki-za in Tokyo but in many other venues. He took part in an American tour in 1985, performing at New York's Metropolitan Opera House, the Kennedy Center in Washington, D.C., and in Los Angeles. He first performed in Paris the following year.

In 1993, he directed the film Yearning, which was entered into the 43rd Berlin International Film Festival.

Baku Yumemakura wrote the lyrics of his dance production "Yokihi" which is based on the Chinese historical figure Princess Yang Kwei-Fei. In 1993, Baku Yumemakura wrote specially for Kabuki Sangoku denrai genjyou banashi. Both of "Yokihi" and Sangoku denrai genjyou banashi were performed at The Kabuki-za Theater.

Tamasaburō has also appeared in a number of films and special dance performances such as BESETO in 2001, which celebrated the entertainment traditions of China, Korea, and Japan. In 1996, he collaborated with Yo-yo Ma and performed at the Suntory Hall in Tokyo, dancing dramatically to Johann Sebastian Bach's "Suite No. 5 for Unaccompanied Cello"; the piece was subsequently filmed for Ma's Inspired by Bach short film series, titled Struggle for Hope. He directed the Kodo One Earth Tour Special in 2003 as well as performed alongside the taiko drummers in 2006, as part of Kodo's 25th anniversary celebration.

== Honours ==
- Kikuchi Kan Prize (2009)
- Living National Treasure (2012)
- Ordre des Arts et des Lettres, Commandeur (2013)
- Medal with Purple Ribbon (2014)
- Praemium Imperiale (2019)
- Person of Cultural Merit (2019)
