= Taiga drama =

Japanese annual drama series

Taiga drama (Japanese: 大河ドラマ, Hepburn: Taiga dorama; "Big River Drama") (English title: Historical Drama) is the name NHK gives to the annual year-long historical drama television series it broadcasts in Japan. Beginning in 1963 with the black-and-white Hana no Shōgai, starring kabuki actor Onoe Shoroku II and Awashima Chikage, the network regularly hires different writers, directors, and other creative staff for each taiga drama. The 45-minute show airs on the NHK General TV network every Sunday at 8:00pm, with rebroadcasts on Saturdays at 1:05pm. NHK BS, NHK BS Premium 4K and NHK World Premium broadcasts are also available.

Taiga dramas are very costly to produce. The usual procedure of a taiga drama production would have one-third of the total number of scripts finished before shooting begins. Afterwards, audience reception is taken into account as the rest of the series is written. Many times, the dramas are adapted from a novel (e.g. Fūrin Kazan is based on The Samurai Banner of Furin Kazan). Though taiga dramas have been regarded by Japanese viewers as the most prestigious among dramas in Japan, viewership ratings have considerably declined in recent years.

== Current series ==
- Brothers in Arms (2026)

== Upcoming series ==
- The Shogunate Rebel (2027)
- John Mung (2028)

== List of series ==
Showa Era
#	Romanised Name	English title	Start	End	Starring	Supporting cast	Notes	Average Rating
1	Hana no Shōgai 花の生涯	Life of a Flower	7 April 1963	29 December 1963	Onoe Shoroku II (as Ii Naosuke)	Chikage Awashima; Kaoru Yachigusa; Kyōko Kagawa; Keiji Sada	Detail Black and white. Bakumatsu period. Only footage fragments of episodes 1 and 38 still exist.	20.2%
2	Akō Rōshi 赤穂浪士		5 January 1964	27 December 1964	Kazuo Hasegawa (as Ōishi Kuranosuke)	Isuzu Yamada; Osamu Takizawa; Chikage Awashima; Onoe Baikō VII	Detail Black and white. Also the most viewed taiga drama in its early history. Set during the Edo period. A scene from episode 7 and full footage of episode 47 still exist.	31.9%
3	Taikōki 太閤記		3 January 1965	26 December 1965	Ken Ogata (as Toyotomi Hideyoshi)	Shiho Fujimura; Yoshiko Mita; Sessue Hayakawa; Kōji Takahashi	Detail Black and white. Set in the Sengoku period. Only episode 42 still exists.	31.2%
4	Minamoto no Yoshitsune 源義経	Minamoto no Yoshitsune	2 January 1966	25 December 1966	Onoe Kikunosuke IV (as Minamoto no Yoshitsune)	Ken Ogata; Junko Fuji; Osamu Takizawa; Isuzu Yamada	Detail Black and white. Set during the Genpei War at the end of the Heian period. Only episodes 1, 33, and 52 still exist.	23.5%
5	San Shimai 三姉妹	Three Sisters	1 January 1967	24 December 1967	Mariko Okada (as Mura) Shiho Fujimura (as Rui); Komaki Kurihara (as Yuki)	Tsutomu Yamazaki; Shinsuke Ashida; Kō Nishimura; Osamu Takizawa	Detail Black and white. Set at the end of the Edo period into Meiji Restoration. It was chosen to commemorate the 100th year since the Meiji Restoration. Only episode 19 still exists.	19.1%
6	Ryōma ga Yuku 竜馬がゆく	Ryōma Goes	7 January 1968	29 December 1968	Kin'ya Kitaōji (as Sakamoto Ryōma)	Ruriko Asaoka; Yoshie Mizutani; Hideki Takahashi; Keiju Kobayashi	Detail Black and white. Bakumatsu period. Along with previous year's Taiga drama, this was also chosen as part of the 100th year celebration since the Meiji Restoration. Only episode 16 still exists.	14.5%
7	Ten to Chi to 天と地と	Heaven and Earth	5 January 1969	28 December 1969	Kōji Ishizaka (as Nagao Kagetora/Uesugi Kenshin)	Fumie Kashiyama; Ineko Arima; Osamu Takizawa; Kōji Takahashi	Detail Sengoku period. Only episode 50 and a fragment of episode 2 still exist. Colour. Future broadcasts are in colour.	25.0%
8	Momi no Ki wa Nokotta 樅の木は残った	The Fir Tree Remained	4 January 1970	27 December 1970	Mikijirō Hira (as Harada Kai)	Sayuri Yoshinaga; Komaki Kurihara; Kinuyo Tanaka; Kin'ya Kitaōji	Detail About the Date Disturbance during the Edo period. Although there were no battles, viewers commented that it was dark in tone. It was once thought to be entirely lost, but episode 29 in full color was discovered to still exist. It was then revealed in February 2011 that video tapes of 51 episodes out of 52 were recovered, albeit in black and white due to the limitations of the recording technology at the time.	21.0%
9	Haru no Sakamichi 春の坂道	Slope of Spring	3 January 1971	26 December 1971	Nakamura Kinnosuke (as Yagyū Munenori)	Yoshio Harada; Yoko Tsukasa; Ichikawa Ebizō X So Yamamura	Detail Set during late Sengoku period to early Edo period. No footage in full color still exist. Only the final episode still remains in black and white.	21.7%
10	Shin Heike Monogatari 新・平家物語	New Tale of the Heike	2 January 1972	24 December 1972	Tatsuya Nakadai (as Taira no Kiyomori)	Tamao Nakamura; Tsutomu Yamazaki; Masakazu Tamura; Osamu Takizawa	Detail Set during the late Heian era. Episodes 46 and 52 still exist in black and white.	21.4%
11	Kunitori Monogatari 国盗り物語	Tale of Taking Countries	7 January 1973	30 December 1973	Mikijirō Hira (as Saitō Dōsan) Hideki Takahashi (as Oda Nobunaga)	Keiko Matsuzaka; Shōhei Hino; Shigeru Tsuyuguchi; Masaomi Kondō	Detail Sengoku period. All footage of the regular broadcast is lost. In 2015, videotape recordings of episodes 37 and 38 were recovered.	22.4%
12	Katsu Kaishū 勝海舟		6 January 1974	29 December 1974	Tetsuya Watari → Hiroki Matsukata (as Katsu Kaishū)	Reiko Ohara; Yoshiko Kuga; Keiju Kobayashi; Onoe Shoroku II	Detail Set during Bakumatsu at the end of the Edo period. Only episodes 6, 7, 32, 35, 37, 38, 39, and 44 have been discovered to still exist.	24.2%
13	Genroku Taiheiki 元禄太平記		6 January 1975	29 December 1975	Kōji Ishizaka (as Yanagisawa Yoshiyasu)	Tōru Emori; Muga Takewaki; Shinsuke Ashida; Hisaya Morishige	Detail Set during the Edo period. Episodes 2, 3, 7, and 18 still exist in its original broadcast form. As of 2016, a recording of episode 9 was recovered, as well as 41 videotaped episodes in 2019.	24.7%
14	Kaze to Kumo to Niji to 風と雲と虹と	Wind, Clouds, and Rainbow	4 January 1976	26 December 1976	Gō Katō (as Taira no Masakado)	Sayuri Yoshinaga; Masao Kusakari; Shigeru Tsuyuguchi; Ken Ogata	Detail Heian period. It is the oldest NHK Taiga drama to date where all 52 episodes have been preserved.	24.0%
15	Kashin 花神	Flower Spirit	2 January 1977	25 December 1977	Nakamura Umenosuke IV (as Ōmura Masujirō)	Masatoshi Nakamura; Jukichi Uno; Ruriko Asaoka; Hideki Takahashi	Detail Bakumatsu period. Only episodes 19, 24, 34, 39, and 52 (with 6 minutes missing) have been recovered.	19.0%
16	Ōgon no Hibi 黄金の日日	Golden Days	8 January 1978	24 December 1978	Ichikawa Somegorō VI (as Luzon Sukezaemon)	Komaki Kurihara; Jinpachi Nezu; Kōji Tsuruta; Matsumoto Kōshirō VIII	Detail Depicts daily life of merchants and traders in Sakai during the Sengoku period. Starting from this Taiga drama onward, all episodes of each work still exist.	25.9%
17	Kusa Moeru 草燃える	Grass Burns	7 January 1979	23 December 1979	Kōji Ishizaka (as Minamoto no Yoritomo) Shima Iwashita (as Hōjō Masako)	Ken Matsudaira; Hiromi Go; Keiko Matsuzaka; Onoe Shoroku II	Detail Set during the Genpei War into the start of the Kamakura period. The story is told from the female main character's perspective. All episodes still exist, however, 18 out of 51 episodes have distorted images and sound, as well as missing fragments.	26.3%
18	Shishi no Jidai 獅子の時代	The Age of Lions	6 January 1980	21 December 1980	Bunta Sugawara (as Hiranuma Eiji) Gō Katō (as Kariya Yoshiaki)	Reiko Ohara; Shinobu Otake; Minoru Chiaki; Kōji Tsuruta	Detail Set during the Bakumatsu and Meiji Restoration periods. Main leads are two fictional characters from rural Japan with commoner roots. It depicts their struggles to survive the chaotic, dark period.	21.0%
19	Onna Taikōki おんな太閤記		11 January 1981	20 December 1981	Yoshiko Sakuma (as Nene)	Masatoshi Nakamura; Pinko Izumi; Harue Akagi; Toshiyuki Nishida	Detail Set during the Sengoku and early Edo periods. Based on the novel Taikōki (which formed the basis of the 3rd Taiga Drama of the same title), with the story told from Toyotomi Hideyoshi's wife's perspective.	31.8%
20	Tōge no Gunzō 峠の群像		10 January 1982	19 December 1982	Ken Ogata (as Ōishi Kuranosuke)	Ken Matsudaira; Juzo Itami; Nakamura Umenosuke IV; Jukichi Uno	Detail Edo period. This is the second depiction of the 47 Rōnin, which focused on different themes and an alternative insight into the Ako Incident.	23.7%
21	Tokugawa Ieyasu 徳川家康	Tokugawa Ieyasu	9 January 1983	18 December 1983	Sakae Takita (as Tokugawa Ieyasu)	Shinobu Otake; Tetsuya Takeda; Masako Natsume; Kōji Ishizaka	Detail Set during the Sengoku and early Edo periods.	31.2%
22	Sanga Moyu 山河燃ゆ	Burning Mountains and Rivers	8 January 1984	23 December 1984	Matsumoto Kōshirō IX (as Kenji Amo) Toshiyuki Nishida (as Tadashi Amo)	Reiko Ohara; Yoko Shimada; Kenji Sawada; Toshiro Mifune	Detail First (and so far only) Taiga drama set in the Shōwa period of World War II	21.1%
23	Haru no Hatō 春の波涛	Big Waves of Spring	6 January 1985	15 December 1985	Keiko Matsuzaka (as Sada Yacco)	Masatoshi Nakamura; Morio Kazama; Chikage Awashima; Keiju Kobayashi	Detail Set in the Meiji and Taishō eras. About the life of a former Japanese geisha who became Japan's first actress.	18.2%
24	Inochi いのち	Inochi: Life	5 January 1986	14 December 1986	Yoshiko Mita (as Miki Iwata)	Tetsurō Tamba; Mako Ishino; Koji Yakusho; Ken Utsui	Detail Shōwa era. First taiga drama set in postwar Japan. First taiga drama to be officially broadcast with English subtitles. Fictional female lead.	29.3%
25	Dokuganryū Masamune 独眼竜政宗	Masamune the One-Eyed Dragon	4 January 1987	13 December 1987	Ken Watanabe (as Date Masamune)	Tomokazu Miura; Teruhiko Saigō; Shima Iwashita; Shintaro Katsu	Detail Late Sengoku to early Edo period.	39.7%
26	Takeda Shingen 武田信玄	Shingen Takeda	10 January 1988	18 December 1988	Kiichi Nakai (as Takeda Shingen)	Kyōhei Shibata; Misako Konno; Toshiyuki Nishida; Ryōtarō Sugi	Detail Sengoku period. Last taiga drama to fully air during the Shōwa period.	39.2%
27	Kasuga no Tsubone 春日局	Kasuga the Court Lady	1 January 1989	17 December 1989	Reiko Ōhara (as Lady Kasuga)	Aiko Nagayama; Shinji Yamashita; Tetsurō Tamba; Yoshiko Sakuma	Detail Late Sengoku to early Edo periods. Focuses on the early reign of the Tokugawa shogunate. Earliest premiere for a Taiga drama in 22 years since 1967's "Three Sisters"; the last taiga drama to air during the Shōwa period by only the first episode, and the second episode was delayed; first Taiga drama to be shown during the Heisei period.	33.1%
Heisei Era
28	Tobu ga Gotoku 翔ぶが如く	As If in Flight	7 January 1990	9 December 1990	Toshiyuki Nishida (as Saigō Takamori) Takeshi Kaga (as Ōkubo Toshimichi)	Yūko Tanaka; Sumiko Fuji; Hideki Takahashi; Yūzō Kayama	Detail Set during the Bakumatsu and Meiji Restoration periods centering around two of the last samurai. It is the first taiga drama to be firmly split into two parts.	23.2%
29	Taiheiki 太平記		6 January 1991	25 December 1991	Hiroyuki Sanada (as Ashikaga Takauji)	Yasuko Sawaguchi; Tetsuya Takeda; Frankie Sakai; Kataoka Takao	Detail Kamakura period, going into the Nanboku-chō period during early Muromachi period.	26.0%
30	Nobunaga 信長 KING OF ZIPANGU	Nobunaga: King of Zipang	5 January 1992	13 December 1992	Naoto Ogata (as Oda Nobunaga)	Momoko Kikuchi; Keiko Takahashi; Ken Utsui; Mikijirō Hira	Detail Sengoku period. This is the second depiction of Oda Nobunaga in the main character role and the first full depiction as the sole lead.	24.6%
31	Ryūkyū no Kaze 琉球の風 DRAGON SPIRIT	Wind of the Ryūkyū Islands	10 January 1993	13 June 1993	Noriyuki Higashiyama (as Keitai)	Atsuro Watabe; Tomoyo Harada; Rumiko Koyanagi; Kenichi Hagiwara	Detail Depicts the Ryūkyū peoples during the Azuchi-Momoyama and Edo periods. It features a fictional character as the lead. First part of a 3-part series.	17.7%
32	Homura Tatsu 炎立つ	Burst Into Flames	4 July 1993	13 March 1994	Ken Watanabe (as Fujiwara no Tsunekiyo, Fujiwara no Yasuhira) Hiroaki Murakami (as Fujiwara no Kiyohira)	Yūko Kotegawa; Kei Satō; Tsunehiko Watase; Kōtarō Satomi	Detail Set during the Genpei War during the late Heian period, it focuses on the Northern Fujiwara Dynasty from its founding to its fall. Second part of a 3-part series. Also had the latest premiere for a Taiga drama at 35 episodes split into three parts in itself.	17.3%
33	Hana no Ran 花の乱		3 April 1994	25 December 1994	Yoshiko Mita (as Hino Tomiko)	Ichikawa Danjūrō XII; Mansai Nomura; Yorozuya Kinnosuke; Machiko Kyō	Detail Muromachi to early Sengoku periods, focuses around the Ōnin War. Conclusion of the 3-part series.	14.1%
34	Hachidai Shōgun Yoshimune 八代将軍吉宗	Yoshimune	8 January 1995	10 December 1995	Toshiyuki Nishida (as Tokugawa Yoshimune)	Hideji Ōtaki; Nenji Kobayashi; Nakamura Baijaku II; Masahiko Tsugawa	Detail Edo period. About the Eighth Shogun Tokugawa Yoshimune, known as the "Father of Shogunate Reforms".	26.4%
35	Hideyoshi 秀吉	Hideyoshi	7 January 1996	22 December 1996	Naoto Takenaka (as Toyotomi Hideyoshi)	Yasuko Sawaguchi; Hiroaki Murakami; Etsuko Ichihara; Tetsuya Watari	Detail Sengoku and Azuchi-Momoyama periods. The second depiction of Hideyoshi in 31 years since 1965's Taikōki.	30.5%
36	Mōri Motonari 毛利元就	Mōri Motonari	5 January 1997	14 December 1997	Nakamura Hashinosuke III (as Mōri Motonari)	Yasuko Tomita; Takaya Kamikawa; Keiko Matsuzaka; Ken Ogata	Detail Sengoku period. This work was made to commemorate the 500th anniversary since Motonari's birth.	23.4%
37	Tokugawa Yoshinobu 徳川慶喜	Tokugawa Yoshinobu	4 January 1998	13 December 1998	Masahiro Motoki (as Tokugawa Yoshinobu)	Bunta Sugawara; Ayako Wakao; Hikari Ishida; Reiko Ohara	Detail Bakumatsu period. It covers the life of the last Tokugawa shōgun.	21.1%
38	Genroku Ryōran 元禄繚乱	Chūshingura	1 January 1999	12 December 1999	Nakamura Kankurō V (as Ōishi Kuranosuke)	Shinobu Otake; Noriyuki Higashiyama; Honami Suzuki; Kenichi Hagiwara	Detail Edo period. Third depiction of the 47 Rōnin and the Ako Incident.	20.2%
39	Aoi Tokugawa Sandai 葵 徳川三代	Aoi	9 January 2000	17 December 2000	Masahiko Tsugawa (as Tokugawa Ieyasu) Toshiyuki Nishida (as Tokugawa Hidetada) Onoe Tatsunosuke II (as Tokugawa Iemitsu)	Tōru Emori; Nakamura Baijaku II; Mayumi Ogawa; Shima Iwashita	Detail Azuchi-Momoyama to early Edo periods. It depicts the events of the first three Tokugawa shōguns; this is the second depiction of Tokugawa Ieyasu where he's a main character. First series to be fully filmed in high definition (HD). Future series are also broadcast in HD.	18.5%
40	Hōjō Tokimune 北条時宗	Hōjō Tokimune	7 January 2001	9 December 2001	Motoya Izumi (as Hōjō Tokimune)	Atsuro Watabe; Ken Watanabe; Sumiko Fuji; Kin'ya Kitaōji	Detail Kamakura period.	18.5%
41	Toshiie to Matsu 利家とまつ～加賀百万石物語～	Toshiie and Matsu	6 January 2002	15 December 2002	Toshiaki Karasawa (as Maeda Toshiie) Nanako Matsushima (as Maeda Matsu)	Takashi Sorimachi; Teruyuki Kagawa; Ken Matsudaira; Bunta Sugawara	Detail Sengoku and early Edo periods.	22.1%
42	Musashi 武蔵 MUSASHI	Musashi	5 January 2003	7 December 2003	Ichikawa Shinnosuke VII (as Miyamoto Musashi)	Ryoko Yonekura; Shinichi Tsutsumi; Tsunehiko Watase; Makoto Fujita	Detail Edo period.	16.7%
43	Shinsengumi! 新撰組!		11 January 2004	12 December 2004	Shingo Katori (as Kondō Isami)	Tatsuya Fujiwara; Koji Yamamoto; Masato Sakai; Kōji Ishizaka	Detail Bakumatsu period.	17.4%
44	Yoshitsune 義経	Yoshitsune	9 January 2005	11 December 2005	Hideaki Takizawa (as Minamoto no Yoshitsune)	Ken Matsudaira; Mikijirō Hira; Kiichi Nakai; Tetsuya Watari	Detail Depicts the Genpei War during late Heian period. Second depiction of Minamoto no Yoshitsune in Taiga dramas.	19.5%
45	Kōmyō ga Tsuji 功名が辻	Love and Glory	8 January 2006	10 December 2006	Yukie Nakama (as Yamauchi Chiyo) Takaya Kamikawa (as Yamauchi Kazutoyo)	Tetsuya Takeda; Gin Maeda; Akira Emoto; Hiroshi Tachi	Detail Sengoku to early Edo periods. It depicts a minor samurai and his wife as dual main characters	20.9%
46	Fūrin Kazan 風林火山	The Trusted Confidant	7 January 2007	9 December 2007	Masaaki Uchino (as Yamamoto Kansuke)	Ichikawa Kamejirō II; Gackt; Sonny Chiba; Tatsuya Nakadai	Detail Sengoku period. It depicts the life of one of Takeda Shingen's 24 Generals.	18.7%
47	Atsuhime 篤姫	Princess Atsu	6 January 2008	21 December 2008	Aoi Miyazaki (as Atsuhime)	Eita; Masato Sakai; Hideki Takahashi; Kin'ya Kitaōji	Detail Bakumatsu period.	24.5%
48	Tenchijin 天地人	Heart of a Samurai	4 January 2009	22 November 2009	Satoshi Tsumabuki (as Naoe Kanetsugu)	Kazuki Kitamura; Takako Tokiwa; Hiroshi Abe; Hiroki Matsukata	Detail Sengoku to early Edo periods. Depicts the life of one of the Uesugi clan's long-serving vassals.	21.2%
49	Ryōmaden 龍馬伝	Ryōmaden: The Legend	3 January 2010	28 November 2010	Masaharu Fukuyama (as Sakamoto Ryōma)	Teruyuki Kagawa; Nao Ōmori; Kiyoshi Kodama; Kōtarō Satomi	Detail Bakumatsu period. Second depiction of Sakamoto Ryōma as the main role in Taiga dramas.	18.7%
50	Gō 江〜姫たちの戦国〜	Princess Go	9 January 2011	27 November 2011	Juri Ueno (as Gō)	Rie Miyazawa; Asami Mizukawa; Gorō Kishitani; Kin'ya Kitaōji	Detail Late Sengoku to early Edo periods.	17.7%
51	Taira no Kiyomori 平清盛	Kiyomori	8 January 2012	23 December 2012	Kenichi Matsuyama (as Taira no Kiyomori)	Hiroshi Tamaki; Masaki Okada; Shota Matsuda; Kiichi Nakai	Detail Late Heian period's Genpei War. The second Taiga drama to depict Taira no Kiyomori as its main character.	12.0%
52	Yae no Sakura 八重の桜	Yae's Sakura	6 January 2013	15 December 2013	Haruka Ayase (as Niijima Yae)	Hidetoshi Nishijima; Hiroki Hasegawa; Nakamura Shidō II; Toshiyuki Nishida	Detail Bakumatsu to Meiji periods.	14.6%
53	Gunshi Kanbei 軍師官兵衛	Strategist Kanbe	5 January 2014	21 December 2014	Junichi Okada (as Kuroda Kanbei)	Miki Nakatani; Tori Matsuzaka; Naoto Takenaka; Kyōhei Shibata	Detail Sengoku to early Edo periods.	15.8%
54	Hana Moyu 花燃ゆ	Burning Flower	4 January 2015	13 December 2015	Mao Inoue (as Sugi Fumi)	Takao Osawa; Yūsuke Iseya; Kengo Kora; Yoshiko Mita	Detail Bakumatsu to Meiji periods.	12.0%
55	Sanada Maru 真田丸	Sanada Maru	10 January 2016	18 December 2016	Masato Sakai (as Sanada Yukimura)	Yo Oizumi; Masami Nagasawa; Seiyō Uchino; Masao Kusakari	Detail Sengoku to early Edo periods. Depicts the life of the "Last Sengoku Hero".	16.6%
56	Onna Jōshu Naotora おんな城主 直虎	Naotora: The Lady Warlord	8 January 2017	17 December 2017	Ko Shibasaki (as Ii Naotora)	Haruma Miura; Issey Takahashi; Masaki Suda; Kaoru Kobayashi	Detail Sengoku to Azuchi-Momoyama periods.	12.8%
57	Segodon 西郷どん	Segodon	7 January 2018	16 December 2018	Ryohei Suzuki (as Saigō Takamori)	Eita; Keiko Kitagawa; Shota Matsuda; Ken Watanabe	Detail The second work to depict Saigō Takamori as its main lead in Taiga dramas. Last taiga drama to air in its entirety during the Heisei period.	12.7%
58	Idaten いだてん～東京オリムピック噺～	Idaten: The Epic Marathon to Tokyo	6 January 2019	15 December 2019	Nakamura Kankurō VI (as Shizo Kanakuri) Sadao Abe (as Masaji Tabata)	Haruka Ayase; Takeshi Kitano; Mirai Moriyama; Koji Yakusho	Detail Set during Meiji and Shōwa eras. Last taiga drama to premiere during the Heisei period and the first Taiga drama to be shown during the Reiwa period.	8.2%
Reiwa era
59	Kirin ga Kuru 麒麟がくる	Awaiting Kirin	19 January 2020	7 February 2021	Hiroki Hasegawa (as Akechi Mitsuhide)	Shota Sometani; Mugi Kadowaki; Haruna Kawaguchi; Masahiro Motoki	Detail Sengoku period. First Taiga drama to premiere in the Reiwa period.	14.4%
60	Seiten o Tsuke 青天を衝け	Reach Beyond the Blue Sky	14 February 2021	26 December 2021	Ryo Yoshizawa (as Shibusawa Eiichi)	Kengo Kora; Ai Hashimoto; Tsuyoshi Kusanagi; Kaoru Kobayashi	Detail Meiji Restoration period to Shōwa era.	14.1%
61	Kamakura-dono no 13-nin 鎌倉殿の13人	The 13 Lords of the Shogun	9 January 2022	18 December 2022	Shun Oguri (as Hōjō Yoshitoki)	Eiko Koike; Koji Yamamoto; Yo Oizumi; Toshiyuki Nishida	Detail Late Heian period's Genpei War to Kamakura period.	12.7%
62	Dousuru Ieyasu どうする家康	What Will You Do, Ieyasu?	8 January 2023	17 December 2023	Jun Matsumoto (as Tokugawa Ieyasu)	Kasumi Arimura; Junichi Okada; Keiko Kitagawa; Hiroshi Abe	Detail Sengoku to early Edo periods. This work is the third depiction of where Tokugawa Ieyasu appears as the Taiga drama's starring character.	11.2%
63	Hikaru Kimi e 光る君へ	Dear Radiance	7 January 2024	15 December 2024	Yuriko Yoshitaka (as Murasaki Shikibu)	Tasuku Emoto; Akihisa Shiono; Ai Mikami; Yasunori Danta	Detail Set during mid-Heian period depicting the life of one of Japanese's first novel authors, who penned The Tale of Genji.	10.7%
64	Berabou べらぼう ～蔦重栄華乃夢噺～	Unbound	5 January 2025	14 December 2025	Ryusei Yokohama (as Tsutaya Jūzaburō)	Ken Yasuda; Fuka Koshiba; Toma Ikuta; Ken Watanabe	Detail Set during mid-Edo period, which depicts the life of publishing illustrated books and ukiyo-e woodblock prints.	9.5%
65	Toyotomi Kyōdai! 豊臣兄弟！	Brothers in Arms	4 January 2026	2026	Taiga Nakano (as Toyotomi Hidenaga)	Sosuke Ikematsu; Riho Yoshioka; Minami Hamabe; Shun Oguri	Detail Sengoku and Azuchi-Momoyama periods.	
66	Gyakuzoku no Bakushin 逆賊の幕臣	The Shogunate Rebel	2027	2027	Tori Matsuzaka (as Oguri Tadamasa)	Mone Kamishiraishi; Kyōka Suzuki; Masatoshi Nakamura; Takao Osawa	Detail Bakumatsu period.	
67	John Mung ジョン万	TBA	2028	2028	Kento Yamazaki (as John Manjirō)	TBA	Detail Bakumatsu period.	

== NHK Special Drama ==
Clouds Over the Hill was originally set for a 2006 broadcast as "21st Century Taiga Drama". However, the scriptwriter of the series committed suicide, causing a delay in production. The series was aired as "NHK Special Drama" in three parts, each part airing from late November to late December of each year.

Title	season	Episodes	Start	End	Starring	Supporting cast
Clouds Over the Hill	1	5 eps	29 November 2009	27 December 2009	Masahiro Motoki; Hiroshi Abe; Teruyuki Kagawa	Miho Kanno; Gō Katō; Hideki Takahashi; Tetsuya Watari
Clouds Over the Hill	2	4 eps	5 December 2010	26 December 2010	Masahiro Motoki; Hiroshi Abe; Teruyuki Kagawa	Miho Kanno; Gō Katō; Hideki Takahashi; Tetsuya Watari
Clouds Over the Hill	3	4 eps	4 December 2011	25 December 2011	Masahiro Motoki; Hiroshi Abe; Teruyuki Kagawa	Miho Kanno; Gō Katō; Hideki Takahashi; Tetsuya Watari

== Fantasy taiga drama ==
Title	season	Episodes	Start	End	Starring	Supporting cast
Moribito: Guardian of the Spirit	1	4 eps	26 March 2016	9 April 2016	Haruka Ayase	Masahiro Higashide; Mizuki Itagaki; Mikijirō Hira; Tatsuya Fujiwara
Moribito: Guardian of the Spirit	2	9 eps	21 January 2017	25 March 2017	Haruka Ayase	Masahiro Higashide; Mizuki Itagaki; Mikijirō Hira; Tatsuya Fujiwara
Moribito: Guardian of the Spirit	3	9 eps	25 November 2017	27 January 2018	Haruka Ayase	Masahiro Higashide; Mizuki Itagaki; Mikijirō Hira; Tatsuya Fujiwara

== New Large-scale Historical Drama Series ==
From 1984 to 1986, NHK aired three Taiga dramas covering modern and contemporary history. To satisfy traditional jidaigeki fans during this period, NHK produced three special period dramas. Many viewers consider these productions to be virtually equivalent to Taiga dramas.

#	Romanised Name	Kanji Name	Episodes	Start	End	Starring	Supporting cast
1	Miyamoto Musashi	宮本武蔵	45 eps	4 April 1984	13 March 1985	Koji Yakusho	Yūko Kotegawa; Eiji Okuda; Kōji Naka; Tetsurō Tamba
2	Sanada Taiheiki	真田太平記	45 eps	3 April 1985	19 March 1986	Tsunehiko Watase	Masao Kusakari; Kurara Haruka; Misako Konno; Tetsurō Tamba
3	Musashibō Benkei	武蔵坊弁慶	34 eps	9 April 1986	12 December 1986	Nakamura Kichiemon II	Tarō Kawano; Keiko Oginome; Bunta Sugawara; Yorozuya Kinnosuke

== Series overviews ==
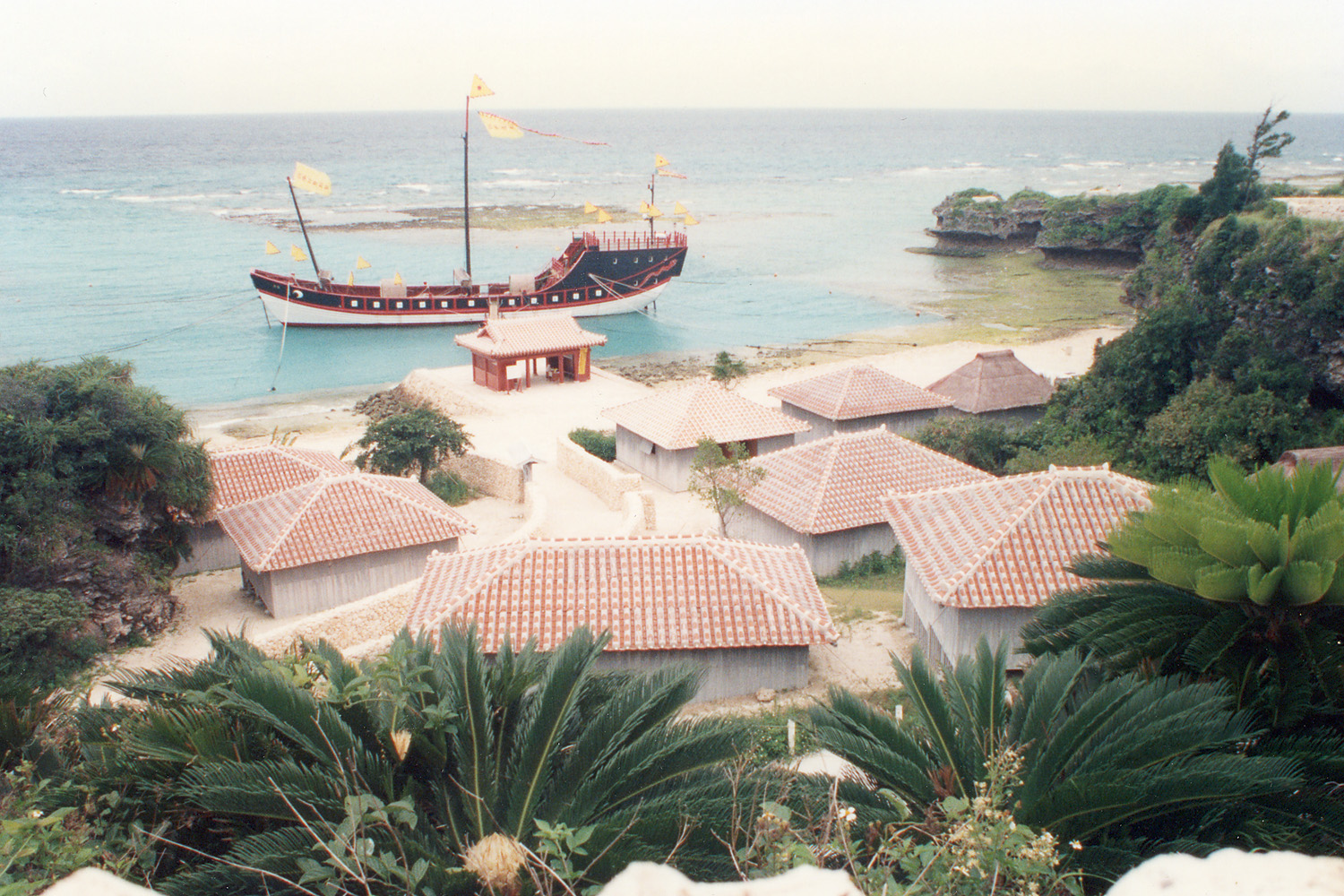
The set of Ryūkyū no Kaze (1993) is now a park in Okinawa.

- 武蔵 MUSASHI (2003). Kabuki actor Ichikawa Shinnosuke VII (now Ichikawa Danjūrō XIII) held the lead role as the swordsman Miyamoto Musashi, whose lives spanned the end of the sengoku and the beginning of the Edo periods. The series was based on the Yoshikawa Eiji novel that forms the basis for most modern fiction based on the events of Musashi's life. This was the first Taiga Drama to have its title in both kanji and the Latin alphabet.
- Toshiie and Matsu (2002). Toshiaki Karasawa as Maeda Toshiie and Nanako Matsushima as Matsu recounted the establishment of the Tokugawa shogunate from the point of view of an outside daimyō.
- Hōjō Tokimune (2001). Kyōgen actor Izumi Motoya played the lead character, heading a cast that included Watanabe Ken. Major events in the series included the Mongol Invasions of Japan.
- Genroku Ryōran (1999). Kabuki actor Nakamura Kankurō V played Ōishi Kuranosuke in this story set in the Genroku period, during which the events of the Forty-seven rōnin occurred.

== See also ==
- Japanese television dramas
- Jidaigeki
- Asadora
- Sageuk
