= Ichikawa Danjūrō XIII =

Japanese actor and stage producer (born 1977)

Ichikawa Danjūrō XIII 十三代目 市川 團十郎
- Danjūrō XIII in 2026
- Born: Takatoshi Horikoshi; 6 December 1977 (age 48); Aobadai, Meguro-ku, Tokyo, Japan
- Other names: Ichikawa Shinnosuke VII; Ichikawa Ebizō XI
- Spouse: Mao Kobayashi (m. 2010; died 2017)
- Children: Ichikawa Botan IV (eldest daughter); Ichikawa Shinnosuke VIII (youngest son)
- Parents: Ichikawa Danjūrō XII (father); Kimiko Horikoshi (mother)
- Relatives: Matsumoto Kōshirō VII (great-grandfather); Ichikawa Danjūrō XI (grandfather); Ichikawa Kōbai II (aunt); Matsumoto Koshirō X (cousin); Onoe Shoroku IV (cousin); Ōtani Hirotarō III (cousin); Ōtani Hiromatsu II (cousin)

Ichikawa Danjūrō XIII (十三代目 市川 團十郎, Jyūsandaime Ichikawa Danjūrō) (born 6 December 1977) is a Japanese Kabuki, film and television actor, and stage producer. He is the eldest son and successor of the kabuki actor Ichikawa Danjūrō XII. He is known as a tachiyaku (actor specializing in male roles). In particular, he specializes in aragoto roles—a family tradition since 1660, beginning with his ancestor and founder of the Naritaya acting house, Ichikawa Danjūrō I.

Prior to assuming his current title, Danjūrō was known as Ichikawa Ebizō XI (十一代目 市川 海老蔵, Jyūichidaime Ichikawa Ebizō), the eleventh holder of the Ebizō name.

== Names and lineage ==
Danjūrō is a member of the acting guild Naritaya, founded by Ichikawa Danjuro I, which dates back to the 17th century. Born into the Ichikawa family, he is the heir to Ichikawa Kabuki. Like all Kabuki actors, his name is also a Yagō (stage name), to which succeeded from his father in 2004. He previously went by the stage name Ichikawa Shinnosuke VII. His father, Ichikawa Danjūrō XII, died in 2013; in January 2019, he announced that he would adopt the name of Danjūrō, thus becoming Ichikawa Danjūrō XIII, in May 2020. The name change was postponed when Kabuki shows were cancelled as a result of the COVID-19 pandemic. Danjūrō assumed his current title on 31 October 2022 ahead of performances starting the following week. At the same time, his son, Kangen Horikoshi, took the name Ichikawa Shinnosuke VIII (the first name his father Ebizō used when he started acting in kabuki theater) and made his kabuki debut.

Currently, he is the thirteenth actor to bear the name Ichikawa Danjūrō; previously, he was the eleventh to bear the name Ichikawa Ebizō and the seventh to bear the name Ichikawa Shinnosuke.

Although he is the thirteenth Ichikawa Danjūrō, he is the third Ichikawa Danjūrō of the modern era, and comes from a different lineage of actors than the original lineage (which ran from Ichikawa Danjūrō I to Ichikawa Danjūrō IX):

- His great-grandfather, Matsumoto Kōshirō VII, was a tachiyaku actors from the late Meiji era until the late 1940s and was a disciple of Ichikawa Danjūrō IX.
- His grandfather, Ichikawa Danjūrō XI, was a tachiyaku actor and the eldest son of Matsumoto Kōshirō VII. He was the eleventh Ichikawa Danjūrō, and third in the modern lineage.
- His first great-uncle, Matsumoto Kōshirō VIII (who later became known as Matsumoto Hakuō I) was a Tachiyaku of the post-war decades. He was the middle son of Matsumoto Kōshirō VII and ended up taking his father's name, becoming the eighth actor to bear the name Matsumoto Kōshirō. Years later, he became the first to take the name Matsumoto Hakuō. He was also known for his prolific acting career outside of Kabuki theatre, often playing roles in Western theatre, films and TV series.
- His second great-uncle, Onoe Shōroku II was the youngest son of Matsumoto Kōshirō VII; like his older brothers, he was a Tachiyaku actor, and was known for being the leading aragotoshi during the Showa era.
- His father, Ichikawa Danjūrō XII, was one an actor in the Showa and Heisei eras. Like most actors who took the name Ichikawa Danjūrō (or that of other actors of the Fujima-Horikoshi family), his main specialty was the aragoto roles.
- His youngest son, Ichikawa Shinnosuke VIII (八代目 市川新之助) is the current heir to the Naritaya acting house. He is expected to become the next head, as well as to take on the names Ichikawa Ebizō XII (十二代目 市川海老蔵) and Ichikawa Danjūrō XIV (十四代目 市川團十郎).

Danjūrō is cousin of some of today's top Kabuki actors, such as Matsumoto Hakuō II and Nakamura Kichiemon II (sons of Matsumoto Hakuō I), Onoe Tatsunosuke I/Onoe Shōroku III (son of Onoe Shōroku II), Matsumoto Koshirō X (son of Matsumoto Hakuō II and nephew of Nakamura Kichiemon II) and Onoe Shōroku IV (grandson of Onoe Shōroku II and son of Onoe Tatsunosuke I/Onoe Shōroku III).

== Career ==
=== Early acting career ===
At a very young age, Danjūrō began rigorous training: voice training to master the unusual vocalizations that characterize Kabuki, and physical training to prepare for the stylized movements and poses demanded on the stage. As Ichikawa Ebizō XI, he appeared on stage for the first time at age five in 1983 at the Kabuki-za, in the role of Harumiya in The Tale of Genji. In 1985, he received the stage name Ichikawa Shinnosuke VII, an honorific name in the Ichikawa lineage, and made his full stage debut in the performance of Uiro-uri, also at the Kabukiza. In 1994, he made his first television appearance in the NHK Taiga drama, Hana no Ran, which starred his father Ichikawa Danjuro XII. In 2003, he was cast as the leading role Miyamoto Musashi, in the NHK Taiga drama Musashi.

=== Later work ===
In 2011, Ichikawa Ebizō XI starred in the film Hara-Kiri: Death of a Samurai, which premiered at the 2011 Cannes Film Festival. He won Best Actor at the 37th Japan Academy Film Prize for performing the title role in the 2013 biographical film Ask This of Rikyu. The following year, he starred in the film Over Your Dead Body. In 2017 he appeared in a supporting role in the Japanese samurai film Blade of the Immortal, which also premiered at the 2017 Cannes Film Festival. He has appeared numerous times at the Kabuki-za, Osaka Shochikuza, Minami-za, and many other theaters in Japan.

In recent years, Danjūrō has been engaged in reintroducing the values of traditional Japanese art to the contemporary generation in projects. Since 2012, Danjūrō has produced the performance Invitation to the Classics to make Kabuki more accessible to smaller cities in rural Japan. Also, between 2013 and 2017, he self-produced a project called "ABKAI" to introduce original contemporary kabuki. On 28 November 2019, Danjūrō starred as Kairennosuke in the stage production Star Wars Kabuki: Kairennosuke and the Three Shining Swords (スター・ウォーズ歌舞伎〜煉之介光刃三本〜, Sutā Uōzu Kabuki ~Rennosuke Kōjin San-pon~); his son Kangen Horikoshi portrayed a younger version of Kairennosuke in the play's third act.

During the 2020 Tokyo Olympics opening ceremonies, he performed kabuki moves in traditional dress accompanied by the jazz pianist Hiromi Uehara.

On 22 May 2022, Danjūrō conducted a kabuki performance with his nirami glare atop the roof of Tokyo Skytree to celebrate the 10th anniversary of the tower's opening.

=== International performance ===
He has toured outside Japan, including performances in Paris in 2004, London and Amsterdam in May–June 2006, at the Paris Opera in March 2007, the Monaco Opera in September 2009, London and Rome in June 2010, Singapore in November 2014 and October 2015, and the UAE in February 2016. He also appeared at Carnegie Hall in New York City in February 2016, in collaboration with noh and kyōgen performances.

Danjūrō became the first kabuki actor to hold commemorative performances at the Théâtre national de Chaillot in Paris, and he earned a nomination for a Laurence Olivier Award for his work on the London stage in 2006. In 2007, France made him a member of the Ordre des Arts et des Lettres in appreciation of his work.

== Filmography ==
=== Film ===
- Sea Without Exit (2006) – Koji Namiki
- Hara-Kiri: Death of a Samurai (2011) – Tsukumo Hanshiro
- Ask This of Rikyu (2013) – Sen no Rikyū
- Over Your Dead Body (2014) – Kousuke Hasegawa/Tamiya Iemon
- Blade of the Immortal (2017) – Eiku Shizuma

=== Television ===
- NHK Taiga drama
  - Hana no Ran (1994) – young Ashikaga Yoshimasa
  - Musashi (2003) – Miyamoto Musashi
  - Naotora: The Lady Warlord (2017) – Oda Nobunaga
  - Awaiting Kirin (2020–21) – Narrator
- Toyotomi Hideyoshi (1995, TV Tokyo) – Kipposhi
- Ooka Echizen no Kami (1997, TV Tokyo) – Ichijuro Ooka
- Chushingura Nakazokyoran (2000, TV Asahi) – Nakazo Nakamura
- Mr. Brain (2009, TBS) – Kōhei Takei
- Matsumoto Seicho Drama Special Kiri no Hata (2010, Nihon TV) – Kinya Otsuka
- Story of Machiko Hasegawa (2013, Fuji TV) – Ichikawa Ebizō IX
- Yowakutemo Katemasu (2014, NTV) – Kentarō Yachida
- Ishikawa Goemon (2016, TV Tokyo) – Ishikawa Goemon
- Okehazama (2021, Fuji TV) – Oda Nobunaga

=== Animation ===
- Case Closed, "Conan and Ebizō's Kabuki Jūhachiban Mystery (Part 1)" and "Conan and Ebizō's Kabuki Jūhachiban Mystery (Part 2)" (2016, NNS) – himself

== Personal life ==
On 19 November 2009, he announced his engagement to news presenter Mao Kobayashi in a written statement and the couple later held a press conference at a local hotel for an official announcement on 29 January. Their wedding took place on 30 July 2010 and was televised by Nippon TV.

On 25 July 2011, his daughter, Reika, was born. On 22 March 2013, his son and successor Kangen Horikoshi (now Ichikawa Shinnosuke VIII) was born.

In 2016, he was ordained as a Shingon Buddhist monk at Narita-san Shinshō-ji temple.

On 22 June 2017, his wife Mao Kobayashi died after a protracted battle with breast cancer.

== See also ==
- Ichikawa Ebizō – chronology of Ebizō kabuki actors
- Ichikawa Danjūrō – chronology of Danjuro kabuki actors
