= Onoe Shōroku II =

Japanese kabuki actor

Onoe Shoroku II
- 二代目尾上松緑
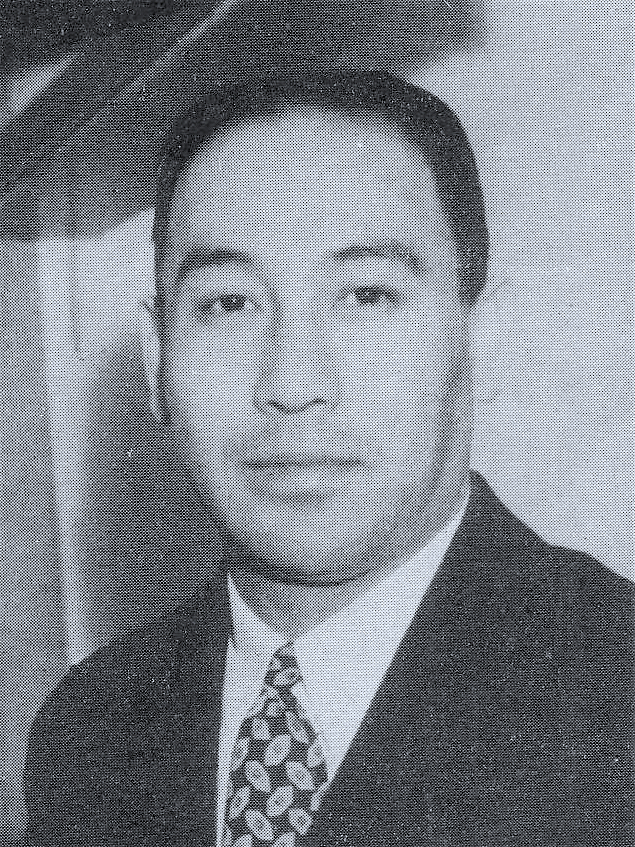
- Shōroku Onoe in 1951.
- Born: Yutaka Fujima (藤間豊) (Note: While the stage names of all kabuki actors have retained traditional order (Surname-Givenname) on Wikipedia, birth names of those born after the Meiji Restoration are in Western order (Givenname-Surname).); March 28, 1913; Nihonbashi, Chuo-ku, Tokyo, Japan
- Died: June 25, 1989 (aged 76)
- Other names: Matsumoto Yutaka; Fujima Kansai II; Fujima Kan'emon IV
- Occupation: Kabuki actor
- Children: Onoe Tatsunosuke I/Onoe Shōroku III (son)
- Father: Matsumoto Kōshirō VII
- Relatives: Fujima Kan'emon II (grandfather); Ichikawa Danjūrō XI; (older brother); Matsumoto Hakuō I (older brother); Akiko Aoki (sister); Nakamura Jakuemon IV (brother-in-law); Ichikawa Danjūrō XII (nephew); Matsumoto Hakuō II (nephew); Nakamura Kichiemon II (nephew); Ōtani Tomoemon VIII (nephew); Nakamura Jakuemon V (nephew); Onoe Shōroku IV (grandson); Matsumoto Kōshirō X (grandnephew); Ichikawa Danjūrō XIII (grandnephew); Onoe Sakon III (great-grandson); Ichikawa Somegorō VIII (great-grandnephew); Ichikawa Shinnosuke VIII (great-grandnephew); Onoe Ushinosuke VII (great-grandnephew)

Onoe Shōroku II (二代目 尾上 松緑, Nidaime Onoe Shoroku; Japanese pronunciation: [o.no.e (|) ɕoꜜː.ɾo.kɯ], March 28, 1913 – June 25, 1989) is the stage name for Yutaka Fujima, a Japanese kabuki actor who specialized in male roles.

== Early life and family ==
Born into a prominent family of Kabuki actors, Shōroku II was the youngest of three sons of legendary Kabuki actor Matsumoto Kōshirō VII, considered one of the most celebrated tachiyaku (i.e., an actor who plays male roles) of the Meiji period until the mid-1940s.

His older brothers were also renowned Kabuki actors and like Shōroku II, also focused solely on tachiyaku roles, Ichikawa Danjūrō XI and Matsumoto Hakuō I (formerly known as Matsumoto Kōshirō VIII).

In addition to being an outstanding Kabuki actor, Shōroku II was known for his skills as a Nihon-buyō dancer and much of his dancing skills were due to the fact that he was the grandson of Fujima Kan'emon II, a well-known Japanese dance master who was a specialist in Nihon-buyō.

By marriage, he was the brother-in-law of the famous onnagata actor Nakamura Jakuemon IV, considered one of Kabuki's greatest onnagata and who was married to Shōroku II's sister, Akiko Aoki. (Note: It is unknown whether Akiko was older or younger than her brother Shōroku II)

His debut as a Kabuki actor was in October 1918, when Shōroku II (then 5 years old) debuted on the stage of the Imperial Theater in Tokyo under the stage name Matsumoto Yutaka and playing the secondary role of Ishiwakamaru in the play "Shusse Kagekiyo".

== Career ==
During his life he was designated a Living National Treasure of Japan and one of the country's four official leading actors.

== Filmography ==
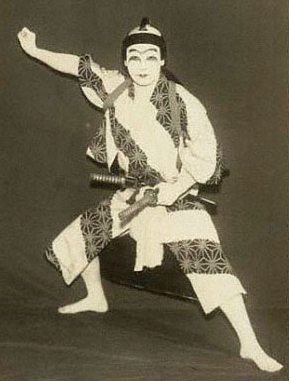
Shōroku Onoe as Sagisaka Bannai in the bunraku play Kanadehon Chūshingura.

=== Film ===
- Banana (1960)

=== Television ===
- Hana no Shōgai (1963) – Ii Naosuke
- Mominoki wa Nokotta (1970) – Date Masamune
- Katsu Kaishū (1974) – Katsu Kokichi
- Kusa Moeru (1979) – Emperor Go-Shirakawa

== Honors ==
- 1972 – Living National Treasure
- 1984 – Person of Cultural Merit
- 1987 – Order of Culture
