= Kizu =

Kizu may refer to:

- Kizu (band), a Japanese rock band
- Kizu, Kyoto, a former town in Sōraku District, Kyoto Prefecture, Japan
- Kizu Station (disambiguation), multiple railway stations in Japan

== People with the surname ==
- Kizu Kōkichi (木津 幸吉, 1830–1895), Japanese photographer
- Takeshi Kizu (木津 武士, born 1988), Japanese rugby union player
