= Nakamura Jakuemon IV =

Kabuki actor

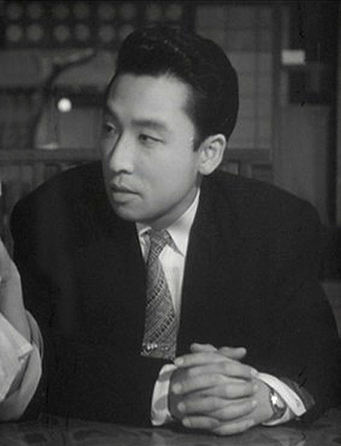
- Nakamura Jakuemon IV in a 1954 film still.
- Born: Seiji Aoki (青木清治) (Note: While the stage names of all kabuki actors have retained traditional order (Surname-Givenname) on Wikipedia, birth names of those born after the Meiji Restoration are in Western order (Givenname-Surname).); August 20, 1920; Nihonbashi, Chūō-ku, Tokyo, Japan
- Died: February 22, 2012 (aged 91)
- Occupation: Kabuki actor
- Spouse: Akiko Aoki (Unknown-2012) (Note: Daughter of Matsumoto Kōshirō VII and sister of the legendary kabuki actors Ichikawa Danjūrō XI, Matsumoto Hakuō I and Onoe Shoroku II.)
- Children: Ōtani Tomoemon VIII (eldest son); Nakamura Jakuemon V (youngest son)
- Parent: Ōtani Tomoemon VI (father)
- Relatives: Nakamura Sagisuke II (grandfather); Nakamura Fukunojō (great uncle); Matsumoto Kōshirō VII (father-in-law); Ōtani Hirotarō III (grandson) (Note: Son of Ōtani Tomoemon VIII.); Ōtani Hiromatsu II (grandson) (Note: Son of Ōtani Tomoemon VIII.)

Nakamura Jakuemon IV (四代目 中村 雀右衛門, Yodaime Nakamura Jakuemon) (20 August 1920—22 February 2012) was a Japanese kabuki actor most known for onnagata performance.

== Names and lineage ==
Born into a well-known family of Kabuki actors from Tokyo, Aoki was the first actor to bear the name Ōtani Hirotarō (大谷廣太郎), the seventh actor to bear the name Ōtani Tomoemon (大谷友右衛門) and the fourth actor to bear the prestigious name Nakamura Jakuemon (中村雀右衛門), being known throughout his long career as a Kabuki actor first as Ōtani Hirotarō I (初代大谷廣太郎), then as Ōtani Tomoemon VII (七代目 大谷友右衛門) and at the height of his career as Nakamura Jakuemon IV (四代目 中村雀右衛門), which would become his most famous stage name.

His two sons are also Kabuki actors: his eldest son, Ōtani Tomoemon VIII (Real Name: Tomoyuki Aoki (Note: While the stage names of all kabuki actors have retained traditional order (Surname-Givenname) on Wikipedia, birth names of those born after the Meiji Restoration are in Western order (Givenname-Surname).), Nihongo: 青木智之, Aoki Tomoyuki) inherited the name and acting style of his grandfather, Ōtani Tomoemon VI (unlike his father and younger brother, Tomoemon VIII became a Tachiyaku just as his grandfather Tomoemon VI) while his youngest son, Nakamura Jakuemon V (Real Name: Sadayuki Aoki (Note: While the stage names of all kabuki actors have retained traditional order (Surname-Givenname) on Wikipedia, birth names of those born after the Meiji Restoration are in Western order (Givenname-Surname).), Nihongo: 青木貞之, Aoki Sadayuki) inherited the name and acting style of Jakuemon IV himself (becoming one of the main Onnagata of the current era).

== Biography ==
Born in Tokyo, Japan on August 20, 1920, he was the son of popular Kabuki actor Ōtani Tomoemon VI (Note: Real Name: Yaetaro Aoki (Japanese: 青木八重太郎, Hepburn: Aoki Yaetarō)) (1886-1943), a well-known Tachiyaku actor (i.e. he only played male roles) and who died during the 1943 Tottori earthquake while on tour in Shimane Prefecture, when the kabuki theater where he was to perform collapsed on top of him.

In 1991 the Japanese government designated him as a Living National Treasure.

== Filmography ==
- 1954 The Woman in the Rumor (Uwasa no Onna) as Dr. Matoba
