= Hana no Shōgai =

1963 Japanese TV series

- Genre: Taiga drama
- Written by: Makoto Hōjō
- Directed by: Hiroshi Inoue etc
- Starring: Onoe Shoroku II; Chikage Awashima; Kaoru Yachigusa; Kyōko Kagawa; Shinsuke Ashida; Masakazu Tamura; Ko Nishimura; Hiroyuki Nagato; Kanjūrō Arashi; Eitaro Ozawa; Keiji Sada
- Narrated by: Eitaro Ozawa
- Theme music composer: Isao Tomita
- Opening theme: NHK Symphony Orchestra
- Country of origin: Japan
- Original language: Japanese
- No. of episodes: 39

Production
- Running time: 45 minutes

Original release
- Network: NHK
- Release: April 7 – December 29, 1963

Related
- Akō Rōshi (1964 TV series)

Hana no Shōgai (花の生涯) is a 1963 Japanese television series. It is the 1st NHK taiga drama.

The average viewership rating was 20.2%, with a peak of 32.3%.

Only an almost complete copy of episode 1 and fragments of Episode 38 still exist, all other footage is said to be lost according to NHK. In February 2023, to commemorate the 60th anniversary, the first episode was re-aired in colour using AI technology.

== Story ==
Hana no Shōgai deals with the Bakumatsu at the end of the Edo period. Based on Funahashi Seiichi's novels of the same title.

The story chronicles the life of Ii Naosuke up to the Sakuradamon Incident in 1860.

== Cast ==
- Onoe Shoroku II as Ii Naosuke
- Chikage Awashima as Murayama Taka
- Kaoru Yachigusa as Masako no Kata
- Keiji Sada as Nagano Shuzen
- Nakamura Shikaku II
- Kyōko Kagawa as Akiyama Shizu
- Shinsuke Ashida as Takemoto
- Masakazu Tamura as Tada Tatewaki
- Ko Nishimura as Tada Ichiro
- Asao Koike as Minegishi Ryunosuke
- Isamu Nagato as Kanroku
- Masami Shimojō as Miura Hokuan
- Kazuo Kitamura as Utsuki Kageyoshi
- Akira Kume as Townsend Harris
- Koji Ishizaka
- Takeshi Katō as Kaneko Magojiro
- Hisano Yamaoka as Kurosawa Tokiko
- Yukiji Asaoka as Okichi
- Chikao Ohtsuka as Rokuzo
- Hiroyuki Nagato as Tsurumatsu
- Minoru Uchida as Kurosawa Chizaburo
- Jun Tatara as Onoe Kotaro
- Tomoko Naraoka as Osei
- Masumi Okada as Henry Heusken
- Isao Yamagata as Arimura Jizaemon
- Kanjūrō Arashi as Tokugawa Nariaki
- Noboru Nakaya
