= The River Fuefuki =

1960 film by Keisuke Kinoshita

- Film poster
- Directed by: Keisuke Kinoshita
- Written by: Keisuke Kinoshita; Shichirō Fukazawa (novel)
- Produced by: Tatsuo Hosoya
- Starring: Takahiro Tamura; Hideko Takamine
- Cinematography: Hiroshi Kusuda
- Music by: Chūji Kinoshita
- Production company: Shochiku
- Distributed by: Shochiku
- Release date: 19 October 1960 (Japan)
- Running time: 117 minutes
- Country: Japan
- Language: Japanese

The River Fuefuki (笛吹川, Fuefukigawa) is a 1960 Japanese historical drama film directed by Keisuke Kinoshita and starring Hideko Takamine. It is based on a novel by Shichirō Fukazawa.

== Plot ==
The film is set in the Sengoku period in Japan, spanning in time from the Battle of Iidagawara and the birth of Takeda Shingen in 1521 to the Battle of Tenmokuzan and fall of the Takeda clan in 1582. It follows five generations of a farming family, who live in a house on the banks of the Fuefuki river, and whose fate is inseparably linked to the Takedas. The main protagonists are farming couple Sadahei and Okei, whose two oldest sons join the ranks of the warriors, while the daughter becomes a servant at the court. After the final battle, Sadahei is the sole survivor of the family. He discovers a flag of the destroyed Takeda clan floating near the river bank, picks it up, and eventually throws it back into the river.

== Cast ==
- Takahiro Tamura: Sadahei
- Hideko Takamine: Okei
- Ichikawa Somegorō VI: Sozo, 1st son
- Kichiemon Nakamura: Yasuzo, 2nd son
- Shinji Tanaka: Heikichi, 3rd son
- Shima Iwashita: Ume, daughter
- Yūsuke Kawazu : Jiro
- Matsumoto Kōshirō VIII as Uesugi Kenshin
- Nakamura Kanzaburō XVII as Takeda Shingen

== Reception ==
The River Fuefuki was Kinoshita's second adaptation of a literary work by Shichirō Fukazawa, following The Ballad of Narayama, released 2 years earlier.

Opinions of critics and film historians regarding The River Fuefuki are mixed. Alexander Jacoby detected a "simple pacifism" in its anti-war theme, lacking an investigation of the causes, a fact which Jacoby already found evident in earlier films by Kinoshita. Donald Richie, calling The River Fuefuki the director's last important film, considered its antitraditionalism to be mere appearance, as it "rejects only the worst of traditional life", but approves of the rest, the institution of the family in particular. Marcus Stiglegger viewed it as a unique pessimistic version of the samurai myth, in contrast to Akira Kurosawa's epic samurai films of the time, and one of Kinoshita's most experimental and spectacular films.

Reviewers also commented on the techniques Kinoshita incorporated into the film, one being the addition of colour to the monochromatic images, an effect which Jacoby called "somewhat schematic". According to Richie, the use of colour imitates Japanese woodblock prints and emphasises the film's theatricality. Additionally, Kinoshita inserted still photographs, particularly during battle scenes, which "both halt and hold the action" (Richie), resembling kamishibai theater. Stiglegger compared the freezing of images with the rigidity of a social system which had exhausted itself in its traditions.
