= Katsu Kaishū (TV series) =

1974 Japanese television series

- Genre: Taiga drama
- Written by: Sō Kuramoto, Shōji Nakazawa
- Directed by: Sanzo Nakayama, Asao Yamanaka
- Starring: Tetsuya Watari; Hiroki Matsukata; Kenichi Hagiwara; Joe Shishido; Tatsuya Fuji; Tsunehiko Watase; Masahiko Tsugawa; Hiroshi Fujioka; Reiko Ohara; Mitsuko Oka; Akiko Nishina; Katsumasa Uchida; Keiju Kobayashi; Onoe Shoroku II
- Theme music composer: Isao Tomita
- Opening theme: NHK Symphony Orchestra
- Country of origin: Japan
- Original language: Japanese
- No. of episodes: 52

Production
- Running time: 45 minutes

Original release
- Network: NHK
- Release: January 6 – December 29, 1974

Related
- Kunitori Monogatari; Genroku Taiheiki

Katsu Kaishū (勝海舟) is a 1974 Japanese television series. It is the 12th NHK taiga drama. Tetsuya Watari was forced to step down from the role of Katsu Kaishū because of his illness so he appeared in only the first 9 episodes.

The average viewing rating was 24.2%, with the highest peaking at 30.9%. Only episodes 6, 7, 32, 35, 37, 38, 39, and 44 have been discovered to still exist.

== Story ==
Katsu Kaishū deals with end of the Edo period. Based on Kan Shimozawa's novels "Katsu Kaishū ".

The story chronicles the life of Katsu Kaishū.

== Cast ==
- Tetsuya Watari (ep.1-9) / Hiroki Matsukata (ep.10-) as Katsu Kaishū
- Onoe Shoroku II : Katsu Kokichi
- Reiko Ohara
- Yoshiko Kuga : Katsu Nobu
- Mitsuko Oka : Katsu Tami
- Akiko Nishina : Ito
- Naoko Otani : Jun
- Rokkō Toura as Takano Chōei
- Hiroshi Fujioka as Sakamoto Ryōma
- Renji Ishibashi : Yoshida Shōin
- Tōru Emori : Sugi
- Joe Shishido as Yamaoka Tesshū
- Masahiko Tsugawa as Tokugawa Yoshinobu
- Katsumasa Uchida : Imuda Shōhei
- Asao Sano as Tetsugoro
- Takeo Chii : Iwajiro
- Yoshiko Kayama : Fude
- Hideko Yoshida : Oshino
- Etsuko Ichihara : Otose
- Daisuke Katō : Shinmon Tatsugoro
- Daijiro Harada : Chiba Jyutaro
- Tadashi Yokouchi : Hirosawa
- Toru Abe : Itakura Katsukiyo
- Shōgo Shimada : old guy
- Kōji Nanbara : Mitsukuri Genpo
- Akira Yamauchi : Kozone Kendō
- Yoshio Tsuchiya : Kimurazusho Yoshitake
- Takao Itō : Takechi Hanpeita
- Hisashi Igawa : Matsumoto Ryojun
- Tatsuya Fuji as Hijikata Toshizō
- Tsunehiko Watase as Tanaka Shinbei
- Kenichi Hagiwara as Okada Izō
- Keiju Kobayashi : Okubo Tadahiro
- Noboru Nakaya
