= Tachiyaku =

Term used in the Japanese theatrical form kabuki

Tachiyaku (立役; alt. tateyaku) is a term used in the Japanese theatrical form kabuki to refer to young adult male roles, and to the actors who play those roles. Though not all tachiyaku roles are heroes, the term does not encompass roles such as villains or comic figures, which form their own separate categories. The hero or chief protagonist of a kabuki play is nearly always a tachiyaku role, and the head of a troupe or acting family typically specializes in these roles.

The term, which literally means "standing role", once was used to refer to all actors, to distinguish them from musicians and chanters, who were called jigata (地方; lit. "earth person", i.e. someone who sits).

There are two main types of tachiyaku role:

- Aragoto: Most of the great heroes of the kabuki tradition are characters performed in the aragoto style. Their face makeup is white with bold red patterns, and their words and actions are likewise quite bold. It takes great training to create, and sustain, the loud and forceful voice of an aragoto character. The chief example of an aragoto role is that of Kamakura Gongorō Kagemasa in the famous play Shibaraku.
- Wagoto: Wagoto roles are softer, gentler, characters. A wagoto figure is often a companion to the chief aragoto role in the play, or a romantic character. Abe Kiyoyuki in Narukami Fudō Kitayama Zakura and Yoshitsune in Kanjinchō are examples of wagoto roles.

There are also a number of lesser categories of tachiyaku roles, including shinbōya (mild-mannered characters who are defined by their suffering great cruelty, usually at the hands of the play's villain) and sabakiyaku (level-headed, wise, and thoughtful characters, often serving as judges or the like). These are lesser roles, very rarely if ever serving as the chief protagonist or hero of a play.

While there are a number of onnagata (female role specialists) who are particularly famous, most of the other top actors of both past and present specialize(d) in tachiyaku roles. This includes the lineages of Ichikawa Danjūrō, Ichikawa Ebizō, Nakamura Kanzaburō, Onoe Kikugorō, and many others.

== Notable Tachiyaku ==
- Bandō Mitsugorō VIII
- Ichikawa Danjūrō I
- Ichikawa Danjūrō II
- Ichikawa Danjūrō VII
- Ichikawa Danjūrō VIII
- Ichikawa Danjūrō IX
- Ichikawa Danjūrō XII
- Ichikawa Danjūrō XIII
- Ichikawa Jūkai III
- Ichikawa Kodanji IV
- Ichikawa Sadanji I
- Ichikawa Sadanji III
- Ichikawa Sadanji IV
- Ichikawa Udanji III
- Ichimura Uzaemon XV
- Ichimura Uzaemon XVII
- Kataoka Ainosuke VI
- Kataoka Nizaemon XIII
- Kataoka Nizaemon XV
- Matsumoto Hakuō I
- Matsumoto Hakuō II
- Matsumoto Kōshirō VII
- Matsumoto Kōshirō X
- Morita Kan'ya XIV
- Nakamura Ganjirō I
- Nakamura Ganjirō II
- Nakamura Ganjirō IV
- Nakamura Kankurō VI
- Nakamura Kanzaburō XVII
- Nakamura Kanzaburō XVIII
- Nakamura Kichiemon I
- Nakamura Kichiemon II
- Nakamura Shichinosuke II
- Nakamura Shidō II
- Nakamura Tomijūrō V
- Onoe Kikugorō V
- Onoe Kikugorō VII
- Onoe Shoroku II
- Sakata Tōjūrō I
- Sakata Tōjūrō IV

== See also ==
- Xiaosheng in Chinese opera
