= Kōkichi =

- Gender: Male

Origin
- Origin: Japanese
- Meaning: Different meanings depending on the kanji used

Kōkichi, Kokichi or Koukichi (written: 幸吉, 小吉, 浩吉 or 鋼吉) is a masculine Japanese given name. Notable people with the name include:

- Kokichi Akune (阿久根 鋼吉; born 1974), Japanese baseball player
- Katsu Kokichi (勝 小吉; 1802–1850), Japanese samurai
- Kokichi Kimura (木村 浩吉; born 1961), Japanese footballer and manager
- Kizu Kōkichi (木津 幸吉; 1830–1895), Japanese photographer
- Mikimoto Kōkichi (御木本 幸吉; 1858–1954), Japanese businessman and inventor
- Kokichi Nishimura (西村 幸吉; born 1919), Japanese soldier and businessman
- Kōkichi Tsuburaya (円谷 幸吉; 1940–1968), Japanese long-distance runner
- Ukita Kōkichi (浮田 幸吉; 1757–1847), Japanese aviation pioneer

== See also ==
- Kokichi Ōma (王馬 小吉), a character in the video game Danganronpa V3: Killing Harmony
