= Matsumoto Kōshirō =

The Matsumoto family crest (mon)

Matsumoto Kōshirō (松本幸四郎; Japanese pronunciation: [mä̀.t͡sɨ́.mó̞.tó̞ | kò̞ó̞.ɕí.ɾó̞ó̞, -tó̞ (|) kó̞ó̞-]) is the stage name of a line of kabuki actors in Japan. Most of these were blood relatives, though some were adopted into the family.

Kōshirō, like other actors' names, is bestowed (or given up) at grand naming ceremonies called shūmei in which a number of actors formally change their names. Though the Matsumoto family is part of the Koraiya guild, there is a strong connection to the Naritaya guild and the Ichikawa family. It was not uncommon for members of the Matsumoto and Ichikawa families to take on names of both families over the course of their careers.

The design of the Matsumoto family mon, four flowers arranged in a diamond shape, is called yotsu-hana-bishi (四つ花菱).

== Lineage ==
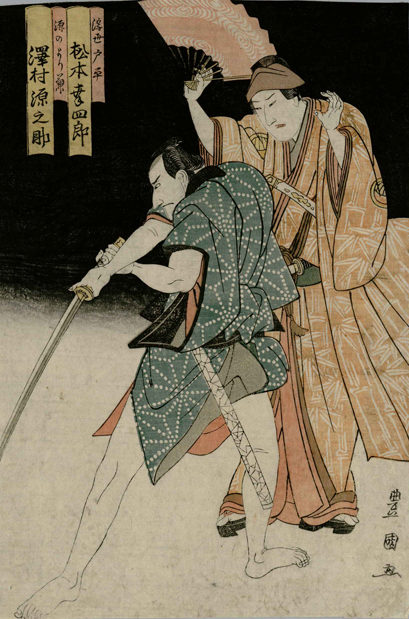
A 1790 Utagawa Toyokuni print depicting a night scene duel portrayed by actors Sawamura Gennosuke and Matsumoto Kōshirō

- Matsumoto Kōshirō I (May 1716 – March 1730) – Previously Matsumoto Koshirō (小四郎), forced in 1716 to change his name when the shōgun's son was named Koshirō; thus, he became the first actor to be called Kōshirō (幸四郎), and would pass this name on.
- Matsumoto Kōshirō II (November 1735 – October 1754, November 1770 – October 1772) – Adopted son of Kōshirō I. Later known as Ichikawa Danjūrō IV and Ichikawa Ebizō III.
- Matsumoto Kōshirō III (November 1754 – October 1770) – Son of Kōshirō II. Later known as Ichikawa Danjūrō V, Ichikawa Ebizō, and Ichikawa Hakuen. One of the most famous of all kabuki actors.
- Matsumoto Kōshirō IV (November 1772 – October 1801) – Disciple of Danjūrō IV and Kōshirō III (Danjūrō V). Previously known as Ichikawa Somegorō I, and later known as Omegawa Kyōjūrō.
- Matsumoto Kōshirō V (November 1801 – May 1838) – Son of Kōshirō IV. Famous for his skill at villain roles.
- Matsumoto Kōshirō VI (March 1844 – October 1846) – Son of Kōshirō V. Later known as Matsumoto Kinshō I.
- Ichikawa Ebizō V – Arguably the most popular actor of the 19th century. Held the name Kōshirō in 1855, but is not counted (numbered) in the lineage.
- Matsumoto Kōshirō VII (November 1911 – January 1949) – Disciple of Danjūrō IX. One of the most famous tachiyaku of the first half of the 20th century (Real Name: Kintarō Fujima, Nihongo: 藤間金太郎, Fujima Kintarō).
- Matsumoto Kōshirō VIII (September 1949 – September 1981) – Second son of Kōshirō VII. Later known as Hakuō I. Arguably the leading tachiyaku of the post-war era (Real Name: Junjirō Fujima, Nihongo: 藤間順次郎, Fujima Junjirō).
- Matsumoto Kōshirō IX (October 1981 – December 2017) – Son of Kōshirō VIII. Performs in Western-style theater and film as well. Later known as Hakuō II (Real Name: Teruaki Fujima, Nihongo: 藤間昭曉, Fujima Teruaki).
- Matsumoto Kōshirō X (January 2018 – present) – Son of Kōshirō IX. Current holder of the name (Real Name: Terumasa Fujima, Nihongo: 藤間照薫, Fujima Terumasa).
