= Over Your Dead Body (2014 film) =

Japanese name
- Kanji: 喰女 (クイメ)
- Literal meaning: Eater woman
Transcriptions
- Revised Hepburn: Kuime
- Directed by: Takashi Miike
- Written by: Kikumi Yamagishi
- Produced by: Misako Saka
- Starring: Ichikawa Ebizō XI; Kō Shibasaki
- Cinematography: Nobuyasu Kita
- Edited by: Kenji Yamashita
- Music by: Koji Endo
- Production companies: Celluloid Dreams; Dentsu; Kinoshita Group; OLM; Sedic International; Toei Company
- Distributed by: Toei Company (Japan); Shout! Factory (United States)
- Release date: August 23, 2014 (Japan)
- Running time: 94 minutes 111 minutes (Director's Cut)
- Countries: Japan; France
- Language: Japanese
- Box office: $1.1 million

Over Your Dead Body (喰女-クイメ-, Kuime; [kɯ̟ᵝ.i.me̞]) is a 2014 Japanese supernatural horror film directed by Takashi Miike. It was released on 23 August 2014.

== Summary ==
A star, Miyuki Goto (Kō Shibasaki) plays Oiwa, the protagonist in a new play based on the ghost story Yotsuya Kaidan. She pulls some strings to get her lover, Kosuke Hasegawa (Ebizō Ichikawa XI) cast in the play, even though he's a relatively unknown actor. Other performers, Rio Asahina (Miho Nakanishi) and Jun Suzuki (Hideaki Itō), lust after Miyuki. Offstage, the cast's possessive love and obsessions exist as reality. Trapped between the play and reality, the cast's feelings for each other are amplified. When it becomes clear that love is not meant to be both on and off stage, love turns into a grudge and crosses the blurred line between reality and fantasy.

== Cast ==
- Ebizō Ichikawa XI as Kousuke Hasegawa/Tamiya Iemon
- Kō Shibasaki as Miyuki Goto/Oiwa
- Hideaki Itō as Jun Suzuki/Takuetsu
- Miho Nakanishi as Rio Asahina/Itō Ume
- Maiko as Kayoko Kurata
- Toshie Negishi as Misuzu Horiuchi/Maki
- Hiroshi Katsuno as Michisaburō Ogata/Tamiya Matazaemon
- Ikkō Furuya as Kanji Shimada/Itō Kihei

== Reception ==
On review aggregator website Rotten Tomatoes the film has an approval rating of 56% based on 9 critics, with an average rating of 7/10.

Dennis Harvey of Variety, after watching it screened at the Toronto International Film Festival, wrote: "Actors rehearsing a classic ghost tale find life imitating art in this atypically dull Takashi Miike opus".
