= Tōru Emori =

Japanese actor and theater director (born 1944)

- Born: 25 January 1944 (age 82); Tokyo, Japan
- Occupations: Actor and theater director
- Years active: 1965-present

Tōru Emori (江守 徹, Emori Tōru; born Tetsuo Kato (加藤 徹夫); 25 January 1944) is a Japanese actor, voice actor, and theater director. He has appeared in more than sixty films since 1965.

== Career ==
Emori entered the acting school at the Bungakuza theater troupe in 1962 and came to fame with the play Ōmugiiri no chikin sūpu in 1964. Also appearing on television and in film, he began directing theater in 1981 with Hamlet.

== Selected filmography ==
=== Television ===
Year	Title	Role	Notes	Ref.
1966	Minamoto no Yoshitsune		Taiga drama	
1967	San Shimai	Yamagata Kyōsuke	Taiga drama	
1968	Ryōma ga Yuku	Shiramine Shunme	Taiga drama	
1969	Ten to Chi to		Taiga drama	
1970	Mominoki wa Nokotta		Taiga drama	
1971	Haru no Sakamichi	Doi Toshikatsu	Taiga drama	
1972	Shin Heike Monogatari	Higuchi Kanemitsu	Taiga drama	
1973	Kunitori Monogatari	Kuroda Kanbei	Taiga drama	
1974	Katsu Kaishū	Sugi Jundō	Taiga drama	
1975	Genroku Taiheiki	Ōishi Kuranosuke	Taiga drama	
1979	Oretachi wa Tenshi da!	Nagumo		
1989	Kasuga no Tsubone	Saitō Toshimitsu	Taiga drama	
1993	Ryūkyū no Kaze	Jana Ueekata	Taiga drama	
1994	Hachidai Shogun Yoshimune	Chikamatsu Monzaemon	Taiga drama	
1996	Kenpō wa Madaka	Fumimaro Konoe	Miniseries	
1998	Tokugawa Yoshinobu	Shimazu Hisamitsu	Taiga drama	
2000	Aoi	Ishida Mitsunari	Taiga drama	
2002	Sakura	Masaharu Nakasone	Asadora	
2003	Musashi	Akaneya Genzō	Taiga drama	
2006	Kōmyō ga Tsuji	Imagawa Yoshimoto	Taiga drama	
2008	Atsuhime	Tokugawa Nariaki	Taiga drama	
2009	Clouds Over the Hill	Yamagata Aritomo		
2010	The Waste Land	Tabuchi		
2012	Legal high	Togashi Itsuo		
2015	Hana Moyu	Akuzawa Gonzō	Taiga drama	

=== Film ===
Year	Title	Role	Notes	Ref.
1968	The Yoshiwara Story			
1978	Hi no Tori			
1983	Genma Taisen	Vega	Voice	
1989	Shaso	Tokunaga		
1992	Dreams of Russia	Matsudaira Sadanobu		
1997	Marutai	Lawyer Nihonmatsu		
1998	Doraemon: Nobita's Great Adventure in the South Seas	Captain William Kidd	Voice	
2003	Tokyo Godfathers	Gin	Voice	
2006	Paprika	Doctor Seijirō Inui	Voice	
2007	Glory to the Filmmaker!			
2008	Dive!!	Ichiro Maehara		
2019	Portrait of Brothers		Special appearance	

Preceded by Takeshi Katō	Bungakuza Representative; 2015–2022	Succeeded by Takuzō Kadono
