= Sanga Moyu =

- Written by: Shin'ichi Ichikawa; Shunsuke Katori
- Directed by: Yūji Murakami and others
- Starring: Matsumoto Kōshirō; Toshiyuki Nishida; Reiko Ohara; Yoko Shimada; Yumi Takigawa; Takuzo Kawatani; Daijirō Tsutsumi; Yoshie Kashiwabara; Satomi Tezuka; Kyōhei Shibata; Ken Watanabe; Saburō Shinoda; Agnes Chan; Shigeru Yazaki; Pinko Izumi; Kuniyasu Atsumi; Kenji Sawada; Keiko Tsushima; Kiyoshi Kodama; Kōji Tsuruta; Toshiro Mifune
- Theme music composer: Hikaru Hayashi
- Composer: Hikaru Hayashi
- Country of origin: Japan
- Original language: Japanese
- No. of episodes: 51

Production
- Producer: Susumu Kondō (chief)
- Running time: 45 minutes

Original release
- Network: NHK
- Release: January 8 – December 23, 1984

Sanga Moyu (山河燃ゆ) is a Japanese television drama based on the 1983 novel Futatsu no Sokoku (二つの祖国) by Toyoko Yamazaki. It was NHK's taiga drama in 1984.

== Synopsis ==
The Amo family lives in Los Angeles, California. Two of the sons, Kenji and Tadashi, live in Japan. Kenji returns to the United States before war broke out in 1941, and is sent to Manzanar with his family as part of the World War II incarceration of Japanese Americans. Kenji joins the United States Army and is sent to fight in the Philippines, where he shoots Tadashi, who joined the Imperial Japanese Army. Isamu, the third son, joins the 442nd. After the war Kenji finds Nagiko, a childhood friend who had confessed her love for him just before he returned to the United States. She was a victim of the bombing of Hiroshima. Kenji then becomes an interpreter at the International Military Tribunal for the Far East, where he commits suicide in the courtroom because of the internal turmoil caused by his split loyalties.

== Cast ==
- Matsumoto Kōshirō IX as Kenji Amo
- Toshiyuki Nishida as Tadashi Amo
- Kenji Sawada as Charlie Tamiya
- Yoko Shimada as Nagiko (Imoto) Tamiya
- Yumi Takigawa as Emi (Hatanaka) Amo
- Minoru Ōki as Imoto
- Toshiro Mifune as Otoshichi Amo
- Keiko Tsushima as Teru Amo
- Daijiro Tsutsumi as Isamu Amo
- Yoshie Kashiwabara as Haruko Amo

== Reception ==
Several Japanese American organizations like the Japanese American Citizens League were concerned that the portrayal of split loyalties would affect the movement for redress. Some individual Japanese Americans, including Mike Masaoka, also wrote to the NHK to express their concerns about airing the show in the United States. It was not broadcast in the United States until 1989. The show's name was also changed from "Futatsu no Sokoku" (Two Homelands) to "Sanga Moyu" (The Mountains and Rivers are Burning) for this reason.

The series was considered unusual in Japan because NHK's Taiga dramas usually concern history before the Meiji era. Many Japanese films at the time showed Japan as being the victims of World War II, but the NHK chose to include Japanese atrocities.

According to the Japan Times, the original novel was based on the life of Akira Itami.

== TV schedule ==
Episode	Original airdate	Title	Directed by	Rating
1	January 8, 1984	"Shōwa 11nen, Yuki ga" (昭和十一年、雪が)	Yūji Murakami	30.5%
2	January 15, 1984	"Kaigenrei" (戒厳令)	Shizuhiro Izuta	
3	January 22, 1984	"Kakanashimi eno Jokyoku" (悲しみへの序曲)	Mikio Satō	
4	January 29, 1984	"Wakare no Ezōshi" (別れの絵草子)	Yūji Murakami	
5	February 5, 1984	"Kazoku" (家族)	Shizuhiro Izuta	
6	February 12, 1984	"Little Tokyo" (リトル・トーキョー)	Mikio Satō	
7	February 19, 1984	"Sōgen Jōka" (草原情歌)	Yūji Murakami	
8	February 26, 1984	"Tairiku e" (大陸へ)	Shizuhiro Izuta	
9	March 4, 1984	"Shanghai ni Itteki no Namida wo" (上海に一滴の涙を)	Mikio Satō	
10	March 11, 1984	"Sento" (戦都)	Yūji Murakami	
11	March 18, 1984	"Ima Hitotabi no" (いまひとたびの)	Shizuhiro Izuta	
12	March 25, 1984	"Tairiku kara no Tegami" (大陸からの手紙)	Mikio Satō	
13	April 1, 1984	"Sorezore no Seishun" (それぞれの青春)	Yūji Murakami	
14	April 8, 1984	"Saraba Nihon yo" (さらば日本よ)	Shizuhiro Izuta	
15	April 15, 1984	"Kaisen Zen'ya" (開戦前夜)	Mikio Satō	
16	April 22, 1984	"December 8, 1941" (1941年12月8日)	Kōji Matsuoka	
17	April 29, 1984	"Pearl Harbor" (パール・ハーバー)	Yūji Murakami	
18	May 6, 1984	"Senka no Rinjin-tachi" (戦下の隣人達)	Mikio Satō	
19	May 13, 1984	"Nihon-tō wo Umeta Hi" (日本刀を埋めた日)	Shizuhiro Izuta	
20	May 20, 1984	"Daitōryō-rei 9066" (大統領令9066)	Yūji Murakami	
21	May 27, 1984	"Manzanar Shūyōjo" (マンザナール収容所)	Yūji Murakami	
22	June 3, 1984	"Kōya no Party" (荒野のパーティー)	Shizuhiro Izuta	
23	June 10, 1984	"Niji no Kanata ni" (虹の彼方に)	Mikio Satō	
24	June 17, 1984	"Sokoku America" (祖国アメリカ)	Kōji Matsuoka	
25	June 24, 1984	"Bōdō" (暴動)	Shizuhiro Izuta	
26	July 1, 1984	"Ningen Test" (人間テスト)	Mikio Satō	
27	July 8, 1984	"Sraba Shūyōjo" (さらば収容所)	Yūji Murakami	
28	July 15, 1984	"America Rikugun Nihon-go Gakkō" (アメリカ陸軍日本語学校)	Shizuhiro Izuta	
29	July 22, 1984	"Rikon" (離婚)	Mikio Satō	
30	July 29, 1984	"Chi no Akashi" (血の証し)	Teru Tajima	
31	August 5, 1984	"Taiheiyō Sensen" (太平洋戦線)	Yūji Murakami	
32	August 12, 1984	"Futatsu no Senjō" (二つの戦場)	Mikio Satō	
33	August 19, 1984	"Dare ga Kokyō wo Omowazaru" (誰が故郷を想わざる)	Kōji Matsuoka	
34	August 26, 1984	"Tokyo Dai-kūshū" (東京大空襲)	Yūji Murakami	
35	September 2, 1984	"Kyōdai Taiketsu" (兄弟対決)	Mikio Satō	
36	September 9, 1984	"Shūsen" (終戦)	Teru Tajima	
37	September 16, 1984	"Hiroshima" (ヒロシマ)	Shizuhiro Izuta	
38	September 23, 1984	"Tokyo-saiban Kaitei" (東京裁判開廷)	Mikio Satō	
39	September 30, 1984	"Monitor" (モニター)	Teru Tajima	
40	October 7, 1984	"Henshin" (変身)	Shizuhiro Izuta	
41	October 14, 1984	"Gaisen" (凱旋)	Morihisa Matsudaira	
42	October 21, 1984	"Eirei" (英霊)	Mikio Satō	
43	October 28, 1984	"Koto Yūshū" (古都憂愁)	Takeshi Kobayashi	
44	November 4, 1984	"Shinjuwan-kōgeki no Nazo" (真珠湾攻撃の謎)	Kōji Matsuoka	
45	November 11, 1984	"Washington Heights" (ワシントン・ハイツ)	Shizuhiro Izuta	
46	November 18, 1984	"Kagiri-aru Seimei" (限りある生命)	Mikio Satō	
47	November 25, 1984	"Yakeato no Seiya" (焼跡の聖夜)	Teru Tajima	
48	December 2, 1984	"Kyōdai Wakai" (兄弟和解)	Yūji Murakami	
49	December 9, 1984	"Saishū Ronkoku" (最終論告)	Mikio Satō	
50	December 16, 1984	"Senkoku" (宣告)	Shizuhiro Izuta	
51	December 23, 1984	"Aratanaru Tabidachi" (新たなる旅立ち)	Yūji Murakami	
Average rating 21.1% - Rating is based on Japanese Video Research (Kantō region).
