= Ōgon no Hibi =

- Genre: Taiga drama
- Written by: Shinichi Ichikawa
- Starring: Ichikawa Somegorō VI; Komaki Kurihara; Ryuzo Hayashi; Jinpachi Nezu; Takuzo Kawatani; Masako Natsume; Keiko Takeshita; Takeshi Kaga; Akira Onodera; Masahiko Tsugawa; Jukichi Uno; Takashi Shimura; Shigeru Kōyama; Kazuo Kitamura; Taketoshi Naito; Kiyoshi Kodama; Masaomi Kondō; Shiho Fujimura; Yukiyo Toake; Kōji Takahashi; Ken Ogata; Tetsurō Tamba; Kōji Tsuruta; Matsumoto Kōshirō VIII
- Opening theme: NHK Symphony Orchestra
- Composer: Shin'ichirō Ikebe
- Country of origin: Japan
- Original language: Japanese
- No. of episodes: 51

Production
- Running time: 45 minutes

Original release
- Network: NHK
- Release: 8 January – 24 December 1978

Ōgon no Hibi (黄金の日日; Golden Days) is a 1978 Japanese television series. It is the 16th NHK taiga drama, and is based on Saburo Shiroyama's novel of the same title. The series is the first taiga drama to focus on the lives of commoners and merchants, and the first taiga drama to be filmed outside Japan.

It had the average viewership rating of 25.9% with the peak reaching 34.4%. All episodes still exist.

== Plot ==
It depicts the lives of merchants and people of Sakai city in the Sengoku period.

== Cast ==
=== The People of Sakai ===
- Ichikawa Somegorō VI as Luzon Sukezaemon
  - Atsushi Kurimata as young Sukeza
- Komaki Kurihara as Mio
- Takuzo Kawatani as Sugitana Zenjūbō
- Jinpachi Nezu as Ishikawa Goemon
- Kōji Tsuruta as Sen no Rikyū
- Tetsurō Tamba as Imai Sōkyū
- Ryūzō Hayashi as Imai Sōkun
- Masahiko Tsugawa as Tsuda Sōgyū

=== People of Toyotomi clan ===
- Ken Ogata as Toyotomi Hideyoshi
- Yukiyo Toake as Nene
- Shiho Fujimura as Yodo-dono
- Sakuragi Kenichi as Toyotomi Hidetsugu
- Usui Masaaki as Maeda Toshiie
- Masaomi Kondō as Ishida Mitsunari
- Akira Onodera as Konishi Yukinaga
- Nobuyuki Katsube as Kuroda Kanbei

=== People of Oda clan ===
- Kōji Takahashi as Oda Nobunaga
- Taketoshi Naito as Akechi Mitsuhide
- Kobayashi Kaori as Oichi
- Tadashi Okuno as Oda Nagamasu
- Saburō Yokō as Oda Nobukatsu (Kitabatake Nobukatsu)
- Shōken Nitta as Shibata Katsuie
- Nagatoshi Sakamoto as Niwa Nagahide

=== People of Hosokawa clan ===
- Yoko Shimada as Hosokawa Gracia

=== People of Tokugawa clan ===
- Kiyoshi Kodama as Tokugawa Ieyasu
- Jirō Yabuki as Hattori Hanzō

=== People of Mōri clan ===
- Shigeru Kōyama as Ankokuji Ekei

=== Others ===
- Noboru Matsuhashi as Ashikaga Yoshiaki
- Vic Vargas
- Luis Cangas as Luis Fróis
- Matsumoto Kōshirō VIII as Jinbei, Sukezaemon's father
- Terumasa Fujima as Sukeza

== Legacy and influence ==
Kōki Mitani decided to become a screenwriter after watching this work. He even featured the character Luzon Sukezaemon, played by Matsumoto Kōshirō, in his own series, Sanada Maru.
