= Matsumoto Kōshirō VII =

Matsumoto Kōshirō VII 七代目松本幸四郎
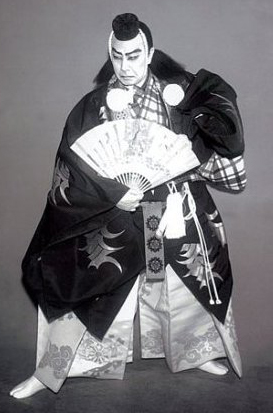
- Kōshirō Matsumoto VII as Benkei
- Born: Kintarō Hata; 12 May 1870; Tōin, Japan
- Died: 27 January 1949 (aged 78)
- Other names: Kōraiya, Ichikawa Komazō VIII, Ichikawa Somegorō IV, Ichikawa Kintarō, Fujima Kansai, Fujima Kan'emon III
- Father: Fujima Kan'emon II
- Relatives: Ichikawa Danjūrō XI (eldest son); Matsumoto Hakuō I (middle son); Onoe Shoroku II (youngest son); Akiko Aoki (daughter); Nakamura Jakuemon IV (son-in-law); Ichikawa Danjūrō XII (grandson); Matsumoto Hakuō II (grandson); Nakamura Kichiemon II (grandson); Onoe Tatsunosuke I (grandson); Ōtani Tomoemon VIII (grandson); Nakamura Jakuemon V (grandson); Matsumoto Koshirō X (great-grandson); Kio Matsumoto (great-granddaughter); Takako Matsu (great-granddaughter); Yoko Namino (great-granddaughter); Onoe Shoroku IV (great-grandson); Ichikawa Danjūrō XIII (great-grandson); Ichikawa Suisen IV (great-granddaughter); Ōtani Hirotarō III (great-grandson); Ōtani Hiromatsu II (great-grandson); Ichikawa Somegorō VIII (great-great-grandson); Mio Matsuda (great-great-granddaughter); Onoe Sakon III (great-great-grandson); Onoe Ushinosuke VII (great-great-grandson); Ichikawa Botan IV (great-great-granddaughter); Ichikawa Shinnosuke VIII (great-great-grandson)

Matsumoto Kōshirō VII (七代目 松本 幸四郎, Shichidaime Matsumoto Kōshirō; 12 May 1870-27 January 1949) was a Japanese actor. He was one of the leading tachiyaku Kabuki actors of Japan's Meiji period (1868–1912) through the late 1940s.

== Names ==
Like most Kabuki actors, Kōshirō took various stage names (gō) over the course of his career. A member of the Kōraiya guild, he was often called by that name, particularly in the practice of yagō, in which an actor's guild name is shouted out as a cheer or encouragement during a performance. Following in his adoptive father's footsteps as a master of traditional dance, he bore the stage name Fujima Kan'emon III in that context. In his first appearance on the Kabuki stage, he took the name Ichikawa Kintarō, and would later take the names Ichikawa Somegorō IV and Ichikawa Komazō VIII before coming to be known as the seventh Matsumoto Kōshirō.

== Early life ==
The man who would later become known by the stage name Matsumoto Kōshirō VII was born as Hata Kintarō in 1870 in the village of Tōin, in the Mie Prefecture. He was the third son of Hata Senji, a builder and contractor who owned a construction company known as "Fukudaya", and his wife Toyokichi Ryō. Singer Takako Okamura is a descendant of his mother's side of the family. In 1874 they moved to Tokyo, where they began selling Manjū. One of their shop's regular customers was the buyō dance master Fujima Kan'emmon II, who eventually adopted him and trained him in the art of traditional dances. He was later noticed by Ichikawa Danjurō IX, who thought that he would be better suited to Kabuki and took him under his wing.

== Career ==
Under the name Ichikawa Kintarō, he debuted in 1881, at age eleven. He grew up to become Danjuro's best disciple. The young Kintaro was indiscreet and featured in many escapades, angering his master. He was expelled from the Ichikawa clan. For a long time it was thought he would never return to the stage. He was later forgiven and by April 1890 returned to the stage and took the name Ichikawa Somegorō IV. In 1893 he took part in the opening ceremonies of Tokyo's Meiji-za theatre.

During these years he first performed the prestigious role of the warrior priest Benkei in Kanjincho, a role which was back then exclusive to Danjuro's clan and which required their permission to perform the role (Ichikawa Ennosuke III's great-grandfather, Danshiro II, was expelled from the Ichikawa clan for the same reason).

Months before his master's death in 1903, he took the name Ichikawa Komazō VIII. This particular name had been used by several actors of both Ichikawa Danjuro and Matsumoto Koshiro's clans and receiving it was an honour.

He took part in the 1911 opening ceremonies of the Imperial Theater, and took the name Matsumoto Kōshirō, one of the most prestigious roles in the Kabuki world which had not been used for over half a century, at a shūmei naming ceremony there a few months later. Along with the onnagata Onoe Baikō VI and wagotoshi Sawamura Sōjūrō VII, Kōshirō became one of the troupe's leading actors.

He performed, often alongside these two compatriots, in productions in Tokyo, Kyoto and Osaka, a rare feat for a Kabuki actor. This was in large part due to the differences between the Tokyo (Edo) and Kyoto-Osaka (Kamigata) styles of acting; few actors were particularly successful at performing in both regions. Two of his more common roles in this period, which he played in multiple cities, were those of Nikko Danjō in Meiboku Sendai Hagi and Benkei. Though a specialist in male roles, and in particular the aragoto warrior roles like Benkei, Kōshirō on occasion played women, such as Lady Yoshio in Meiboku Sendai Hagi.

Continuing the trade of his adoptive father, Kōshirō became the head of the Fujima dance school in 1917, and took his father's name, becoming Fujima Kan'emon III; he would use this name when performing buyō traditional dance, but continued to be known as Kōshirō in the theatre world.

Kōshirō continued to perform in all three major cities through World War II, and made his last stage appearance in December 1948, at the Shinbashi Enbujō in Tokyo.

== Family and legacy ==
Kōshirō had three sons and a daughter. His sons, to whom he passed Danjurō IX's knowledge and teaching techniques, would then become respectively Ichikawa Danjurō XI, Matsumoto Hakuo I (who held the name of Matsumoto Kōshirō VIII for most of his career) and Onoe Shoroku II. They were regarded as the best tachiyaku (male role specialists) of the decades following World War II. His daughter married the onnagata actor Nakamura Jakuemon IV. He was also the father-in-law of Nakamura Kichiemon I's daughter. His grandsons became the most famous Kabuki actors of the second half of the 20th century and still perform alongside his great-grandsons. Today, he has blood relatives in many other Kabuki families, such as Onoe Kikugōrō, Ichikawa Danjurō, and indirectly with Nakamura Kanzaburō's clans.

Kōshirō played the warrior-monk Benkei over 1600 times throughout his career, particularly with fellow actors Ichimura Uzaemon XV in the role of Togashi and Onoe Kikugorō VI in the role of Yoshitsune.

Although he was a candidate to succeed to the name of his master, who died without a male heir, his youthful indiscretions foreclosed this possibility. Danjurō IX's son-in-law Ichikawa Sanshō V (posthumously known as Ichikawa Danjurō X) considered the possibility once again after the former's death, but the idea was quickly discarded by Danjurō IX's widow, who opposed it in accordance with his late husband's will. Sanshō eventually adopted Koshirō's eldest son instead, who became Danjurō XI and the new head of the family.

== See also ==
- Matsumoto Kōshirō - line of kabuki actors
