= Kizu Station =

Kizu Station may refer to:

- Kizu Station (Kyoto), a railway station in Kizugawa, Kyoto, Japan
- Kizu Station (Hyōgo), a railway station in Kobe, Japan
