= Luzon Sukezaemon =

Japanese merchant

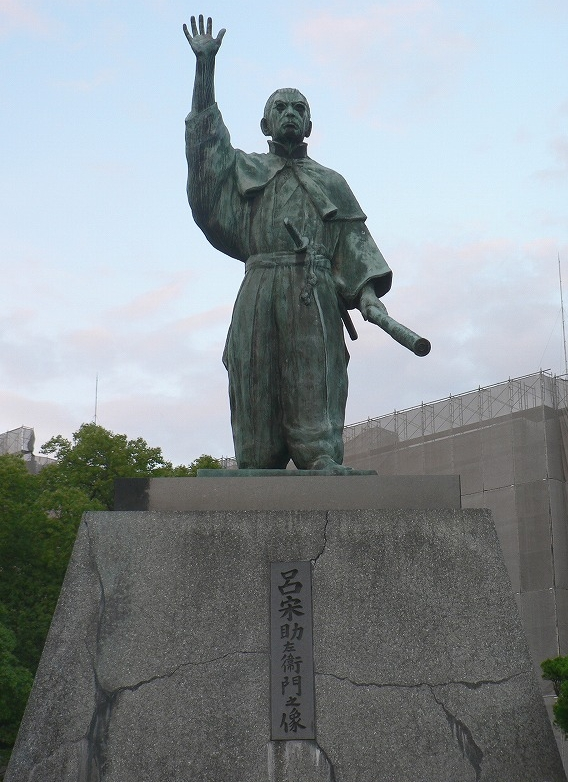
Statue of Luzon Sukezaemon at Sakai Citizens' Hall.

Luzon Sukezaemon (呂宋助左衛門, Ruson Sukezaemon) (b. 1565?) was a Japanese merchant from the port of Sakai, who traded shimamono pottery in Japan from Luzon in the Philippines and later emigrated to Cambodia in the final years of the 16th century.

== Biography ==
Originally known as Naya Sukezaemon (納屋助左衛門), he was the son of Sakai merchant Naya Saisuke. Very little is known about him from original sources, but like many merchant sailors and maritime adventurers of the period, a number of legends have arisen about him. Some historians have proposed he was the wokou pirate called Tay Fusa who fought the Spanish in the 1582 Cagayan battles.

He changed his name in 1593 or 1594 after returning from a trip to Luzon in the Philippines. He became successful and wealthy in the South Seas trade, particularly from selling shimamono pottery from Luzon to Toyotomi Hideyoshi and other powerful lords. It is said that even the great tea master Sen no Rikyū prized some of the tea wares brought back from Southeast Asia by Sukezaemon. Sukezaemon built himself a lavish house in Sakai and lived a rather luxurious lifestyle for several years before attracting the attention and the ire of Hideyoshi. In 1598, the warlord accused the merchant on bogus charges, and confiscated all his possessions; Sukezaemon entrusted his home to his family's temple, the Daian-ji, and fled Japan for Cambodia.

He is buried at the Daian-ji in Sakai, and bronze statues of him can be seen in that city, and in Manila as well.

== In popular culture ==
Was portrayed by Toshiro Mifune in the 1963 film The Great Bandit (aka The Lost World of Sinbad). He also appeared in a novel by Saburō Shiroyama, and in the 1978 Taiga drama Ōgon no Hibi as well as the 2016 Taiga drama Sanada Maru.

== Bibliography ==
- Canales Torres, Carlos; Del Rey Vicente, Miguel (2021), Naves negras:la aventura del lago español, Editorial Edaf, ISBN 9788441441156
- Miyamoto, Kazuo. Vikings of the Far East. New York: Vantage Press, 1975. pp88–89.
- Turnbull, Stephen (2021). The Lost Samurai: Japanese Mercenaries in South East Asia, 1593–1688. Frontline. ISBN 9781526758996.
