= Yoko Shimada =

Japanese actress (1953–2022)

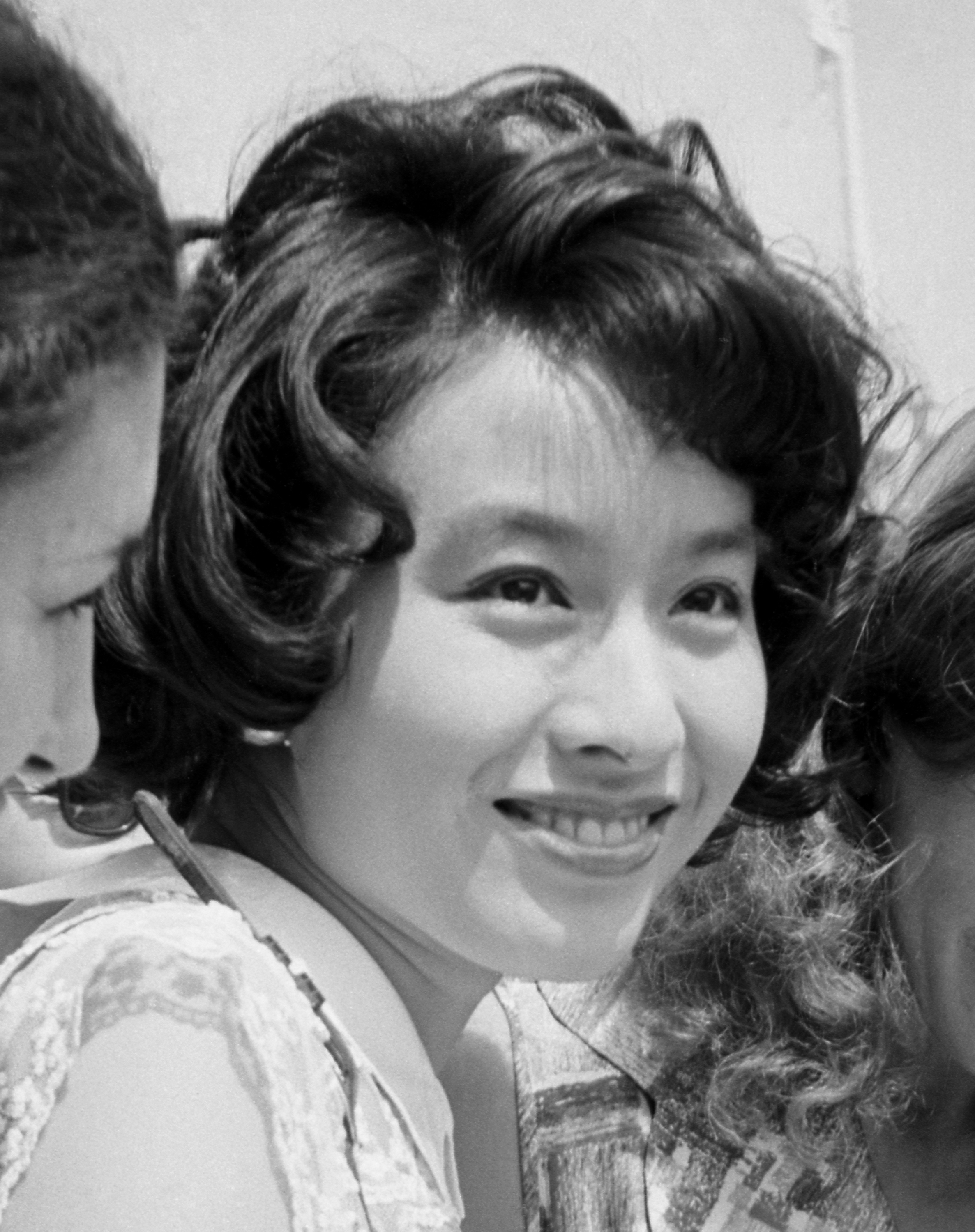
- Shimada in 1975
- Born: 17 May 1953; Kumamoto, Japan
- Died: 25 July 2022 (aged 69); Tokyo, Japan
- Occupation: Actress
- Years active: 1970–2022
- Height: 1.71 m (5 ft 7 in)
- Spouse: Hitoshi Yoneyama (m. 1994; div. 2019)
- Awards: Golden Globe Award for Best Actress – Television Series Drama; 1981: Shōgun

Yoko Shimada (Japanese: 島田 陽子, Hepburn: Shimada Yōko; 17 May 1953 – 25 July 2022) was a Japanese actress, best known to Western audiences for her portrayal of Mariko in the 1980 miniseries Shōgun.

== Shogun miniseries ==
Shimada was the only female member of Shōgun's massive cast of Japanese actors shown speaking English, for which she relied on a dialogue coach, as she was not fluent in the language at the time. Her English improved greatly during the production, however, allowing her to work in a few English language films during the 1980s and 1990s. In 1981, she won the Golden Globe Award for Best Actress – Television Series Drama, and was nominated for a Primetime Emmy Award for Outstanding Lead Actress in a Limited or Anthology Series or Movie for her work on Shōgun. While the nine-hour long Shōgun was a critical success in the U.S., it flopped in Japan when it was released as a severely truncated theatrical version.

== Personal life ==
In 1988, Shimada had an affair with singer Yuya Uchida, who was married at the time. She reportedly had resorted to alcoholism and appeared in a nude photo book in 1992 in an attempt to clear her personal debts. Though the book was a bestseller, it damaged her reputation as an actress. In 2011, at the age of 58, she starred in an adult video.

Shimada died at a hospital in Tokyo on 25 July 2022, due to complications from colorectal cancer.

== Filmography ==
=== Movies ===
Year	Title	Role	Country
1971	Go Go Kamen Rider (ゴーゴー仮面ライダー)	Hiromi Nohara (野原ひろみ)	Japan
1972	First Love (初めての愛)	Mitsuyo Sakamoto (坂本光代)	Japan
1973	Kigeki Nihon Rettō Shindo 0 (喜劇 日本列島震度0)	Earthquake Research Institute staff member (地震研究所所員)	Japan
1974	Nagare no Fu Part I: Disturbance, Part II: Dawn (流れの譜 第一部 動乱 第二部 夜明け)	Saeko Kubo (久保冴子)	Japan
1974	Castle of Sand (砂の器)	Rieko Takagi (高木理恵子)	Japan
1975	I Am a Cat (吾輩は猫である)	Yukie (雪江)	Japan
1975	Kyūkei no Kōya (球形の荒野)	Kumiko Nogami (野上久美子)	Japan
1975	Yogiri no Hōmon-sha (夜霧の訪問者)	Etsuko Ichiki / Noriko Tazawa (dual roles) (市木江津子・田沢のり子（二役）)	Japan
1976	Truck Guys 3: Bōkyō Ichibanboshi (トラック野郎・望郷一番星)	Akiko Mikami (3rd generation Madonna) (三上亜希子（三代目マドンナ）)	Japan
1976	The Inugami Family (犬神家の一族)	Tamayo Nonomiya (野々宮珠世)	Japan
1977	Village of Eight Gravestones (八つ墓村)	Okisa Tajimi (cameo) (多治見おきさ (カメオ出演))	Japan
1979	Dead Angle (白昼の死角)	Ayaka (綾香)	Japan
1979	Dog of Fortune (黄金の犬)	Reiko Kitamori (北守礼子)	Japan
1980	Shōgun [theatrical edit]	Mariko Toda (戸田まり子)	U.S. / Japan
1981	Little Champion (aka My Champion) (リトルチャンピオン)	Michiko Suwa (Miki Gorman) (諏訪美智子（ミキ・ゴーマン）)	Japan
1987	The Man Who Assassinated Ryoma (竜馬を斬った男)	Kozakae (小栄)	Japan
1988	Hanazono no Meikyū (花園の迷宮)	Tae Akimoto (秋元多恵)	Japan
1988	Hashi (橋)	Umiko Takagi (高樹海子)	Japan
1991	Dohten (動天)	Oran (おらん)	Japan
1991	Kaze, Slow Down (風、スローダウン)	Bike club manager's wife (バイククラブ監督の妻)	Japan
1993	Ring! Ring! Ring! The Champion Belt of Tears (リング・リング・リング 涙のチャンピオンベルト)	Devil Naomi (デビル奈緒美)	Japan
1995	Police Department Crime Prevention Section 5104 Incident (ゴト師株式会社スペシャル 警視庁防犯課第5104号事件)	Ryōko Amachi (天地猟子)	Japan
1995	The Hunted	Mieko Takeda (武田美恵子)	U.S. / Japan
1995	Crying Freeman	Kimie Hanada (花田君江)	Canada / France / Japan
2000	Ane Gokudō Bosatsu no Ryūko (姐極道 菩薩の龍子)		Japan
2001	Hero Zheng Chenggong (aka The Sino-Dutch War 1661) (英雄鄭成功)	Matsu Tagawa (田川マツ)	China
2002	Undiscovered Tomb (極地皇陵)	Professor Ivy Chan	Hong Kong
2005	The Deep Red (深紅)	Dr. Tanaka (田中医師)	Japan
2009	Dear Heart: Furuete Nemure (Dear Heart-震えて眠れ-)		Japan
2010	To Live as an Actress (島田陽子に逢いたい)	Herself (島田陽子)	Japan
2011	Secret Affair (aka Yōko Shimada – Assignation) (密会)		Japan
2011	Faithless Love (不貞愛)		Japan
2011	Ashita Naku (明日泣く)		Japan
2012	Kanojo wa Umi e (彼女は海へ)	Nanako (菜々子)	Japan
2015	Santa Claus (サンタクロースズ)	Santa Kurosu (黒須三太)	Japan
2016	God in Jail (塀の中の神様)	Fusako (房子)	Japan
2016	Kanon (カノン)	Sumiko Arai (新井澄子)	Japan
2022	Ever Garden (エヴァーガーデン)	Haruko Segara (相楽晴子)	Japan

=== Television ===
- Osanazuma (1970)
- Kamen Rider (1971) – Hiromi Nohara
- Karei-naru Ichizoku (1974–75) – Tsugiko Manpyo
- Shiroi Kyotō (1978)
- Ōgon no Hibi (1978) – Tama
- Shōgun (1980) – Lady Toda Buntaro – Mariko
- Chicago Story (1982) – Wing
- Sanga Moyu (1984)
- Oka no Ue no Himawari (1993)
