= Kurosawa Tokiko =

Late Tokugawa Era imperial restoration loyalist

Kurosawa Tokiko (Japanese: 黒沢止幾子(ときこ)) (1806–1890, born Kurosawa Kon) was a poet, teacher, and imperial loyalist in late Tokugawa and early Meiji Japan. She is mostly known for traveling by herself to petition for the release of her domainal lord Tokugawa Nariaki.

== Early life ==
Kurosawa Kon was born within the Mito Domain – more specifically in what is now Katsura village, Shirosato town, in Ibaraki Prefecture – on 21 December 1806. Her father Masakichi, a teacher and Yamabushi priest, divorced and left her mother when Kon was two years old. Kon was raised by her mother Fusako and grandfather Kissō. Her family ran the village school and Kissō fostered Tokiko's education, introducing her to texts such as Onna Daigaku.

In 1824 at 19 years of age, Kon married Kamoshida Hikozō and moved to Kanasagō. Kamoshida died in the early 1830s and she returned to her native home with her daughters, changing her name to Tokiko.

Due to the instabilities of the Tenpō era, Kurosawa became a peddler, traveling to sell combs and ornamental hairpins. Her travels put her in touch with the regional literati and she began writing Chinese and Japanese poetry.

In 1839 the Kurosawa family adopted Sukenobu Hōin as an heir, who depending on sources was either Kurosawa's second husband or stepfather. Sukenobu took over both a local religious branch as well as the school. He fell ill in 1854 and died the following year.

Kurosawa was hired to tutor members of the Kikuya family in 1851 and took on a tutoring position in Shioko the next year. Due to Hōin's death and her own newfound tutoring experience, she took charge of the school in 1854, becoming the first female member of the Kurosawa family to run it. When she started, the school had 16 students, including two girls.

== Petition for the release of Tokugawa Nariaki ==
=== Background ===
Tokugawa Nariaki, the lord of Mito Domain, was placed under house arrest in 1844 as part of the Ansei Purge due to his being an imperial loyalist and his opposition to the opening up of Japan to foreign trade.

Historian Laura Nenzi identifies at least five instances between the end of 1858 and spring of 1859 that culminated in the decision of Kurosawa, who had been sympathetic to the loyalist cause for some time, to travel to the imperial capital of Kyoto to petition for Tokugawa's release.

First, on the evening of the 24th of August 1858, Donati's Comet was spotted. Kurosawa, who practiced divination, interpreted the comet as signaling an imminent rebellion by the prime minister Ii Naosuke. Ii opened up Japan to foreign trade and placed Tokugawa under house arrest, both of which Kurosawa despised.

Second, on 16 September a visitor named Kubōgame shared a poem attributed to Emperor Kōmei with Kurosawa. In response she penned a poem in symbolic reply, consoling the Emperor and a broad call to action to fight against the barbarians.

Third, on December 26 a loyalist acquaintance named Shishido Nakatsukasa visited her. Nenzi suggests that a remark by Shishido that it had been difficult for him "as a man" to travel suggested to her that she ought to get directly involved "not despite, but because of her gender".

Fourth, a few days after the New YearKurosawa visited a stone monument at Nenohigahara (or Nenohinohara) inscribed with verses by Tokugawa Nariaki. She wrote a poem in symbolic response to the verses. This visit either made up her mind or gave her symbolic endorsement to travel to Kyoto.

Fifth, as Kurosawa began to embark on her journey, she came across Koibuchi Kaname, then a local celebrity for his devotion to Tokugawa, and later among the group that killed Prime Minister Ii Naosuke. Kurosawa likely interpreted the encounter as further symbolic endorsement.

At the onset of her journey Kurosawa traveled with fellow loyalist Koibuchi Jihei. She also received assistance from many others, including the Kikuya family she had previously tutored. Not all of her helpers were aware of the reasons for her trip. Being from Mito, the hotbed of anti-shogunate resistance, and being an unescorted woman was a double cause for concern. She registered as traveling from Kōzuke Province instead of Mito, and to nonloyalists she identified herself as a poet and the trip as a literary pursuit.

=== Petitioning in Kyoto ===
Kurosawa reached Kyoto on 27 April 1859. She stayed at Ōgiya inn, as usual for Mito loyalists. Whereas petitioning various government officials and domainal lords was commonplace, she went directly to the imperial court. Also unusual, her request was in the form of a long poem, one that explains why she got involved, villainizes Ii Naosuke, proclaims Tokugawa Nariaki's innocence and asks for his release, and hopes for a better future for Japan.

In order to deliver her poem, Kurosawa visited the Kitano Tenmangū shrine, where she met the head priest Keien. He referred her to government official and imperial loyalist Saida Sahei (Ubei) Koresada, to whom she delivered her poem. She then went to Osaka to wait for the results. The poem eventually caught the attention of the Kyoto City Magistrate, and she was arrested while still in Osaka.

=== Incarceration ===
Kurosawa was questioned several times while incarcerated in Osaka. Her interrogators were sympathetic to her gender, presuming her loyal intentions and their case for her arrest hinged on her insistence that Ii Naosuke was evil. She was transferred to Kyoto, where the interrogators viewed her gender to mean that she must have had the assistance of male accomplices and demanded their names. When she insisted she acted alone, she was threatened with torture. The interrogators also doubted that she wrote the petition poem herself. In initial interrogations, her sighting of Donati's Comet was only mentioned in passing, yet it eventually dominated the interrogations. Nenzi concludes that this was because as interrogations in Kyoto dragged on, she needed to present a justification for her trip that demonstrated that she absolutely was not personally connected to Tokugawa Nariaki.

Kurosawa was eventually pressured into making a confession, since she could not be convicted without one. Her official confession conceded some concerns of her interrogators such as her gender and that she did not intend to commit treason, but she also reiterated Tokugawa Nariaki's innocence and did not name any accomplices. The title she used in her confession to refer to him implicitly rejected the authority of the Tokugawa Shogunate.

Eventually Kurosawa fell ill while imprisoned and recalled being visited in her dreams by the ghost of Sugawara no Michizane, who was, among other things, a protector of the falsely accused and an ultimate example of loyalty to the Emperor. She did not mention her dream to her interrogators. Two weeks after the dream, the Hyōjōsho in Edo took over the case and had her taken to Edo in a cage. The journey to Edo took 13 days and her placard identified her as a poetry instructor, not as a political prisoner.

Kurosawa was confined to a solitary cell in Asakusa for two months, and her trial afterwards coincided with trials for major loyalists. She then became severely ill and her proceedings were halted for weeks and a doctor was summoned. When she recovered, she was moved to Tenmachō prison. On 5 November she was called for cross-examination, and five days later interrogators produced a formal written statement, which she estimated to be over 30 pages long. Eleven days later, she was sentenced to medium-range banishment.

== Later life ==
Kurosawa ignored the terms of her banishment and returned to her hometown. This was punishable by branding or tattooing, but as long as trouble wasn't stirred government officials often turned a blind eye. She continued to teach, practice divination, and write poetry. In 1872, the Meiji government started a national school system and Kurosawa's school was selected to become Suzugoya's first elementary school, making Kurosawa the first female teacher in Ibaraki.

In 1875, just after her retirement from teaching, Kurosawa was officially recognized for her contribution to the loyalist cause. She received a lifelong grant of land worth ten koku. A text commended her ability to rise above the limitations of her gender. At some point in 1889, she met with Tokugawa Nariaki's widow Tominomiya.

Kurosawa died in 1890. After her death Mito locals celebrated her as an example of Mito's contribution to the Meiji Restoration. She was posthumously given a court rank. Various authors in the 20th century heralded cherry-picked versions of her story as an example for their own agendas.
