= Katsu Kokichi =

Samurai noted for his autobiography (1802–1850)

- Born: Otani Kokichi; 1802; Edo
- Died: 1850 (aged 47–48)
- Occupation: Samurai
- Notable work: Musui's Story

Katsu Kokichi (勝 小吉) (1802–1850) was a low-ranking samurai whose autobiography serves as an important description of life in the Edo period.

== Life and works ==
Born Otani Kokichi in Edo, he was adopted by the Katsu family in order to marry the only Katsu daughter, Nobuko. Kokichi's father, Otani Heizo, was a minor official in the shogunate. His half brother, Otani Hikoshiro, was twenty-five years older than Kokichi. After their father's retirement as family head, Hikoshiro became responsible for all the family; he was a noted calligrapher and Confucian scholar and was twice distinguished as district administrator within the shōgun's domain.

By contrast, Katsu Kokichi led a life of idleness, never achieving an official post and supplementing his small (41 koku) income by dealing in swords, among other things. The other things, contrary to samurai-class ideals, included acting as a security guard and lending money at high interest. When Kokichi's son Rintaro (later to become the famous naval commander Katsu Kaishū, a major figure during the Meiji era modernization of Japan) was fifteen, Kokichi retired as family head, passing on that duty to young Rintaro.

Katsu Kokichi died in Edo in 1850, three years before Commodore Matthew C. Perry reached Japan.

== Legacy ==
During his last days, Kokichi wrote an autobiography (one of the few surviving from pre-Meiji Japan) titled Musui Dokugen ("Musui's Story"), narrating his life and adventures in a style much like that of the picaresque novel. This book is an excellent description of low-ranking samurai life in Edo during the late Tokugawa shogunate. The autobiography has been translated into English by Teruko Craig, under the title Musui's Story: The Autobiography of a Tokugawa Samurai.
