= Matsumoto Kōshirō X =

Japanese actor and kabuki actor (born 1973)

- 十代目 松本幸四郎
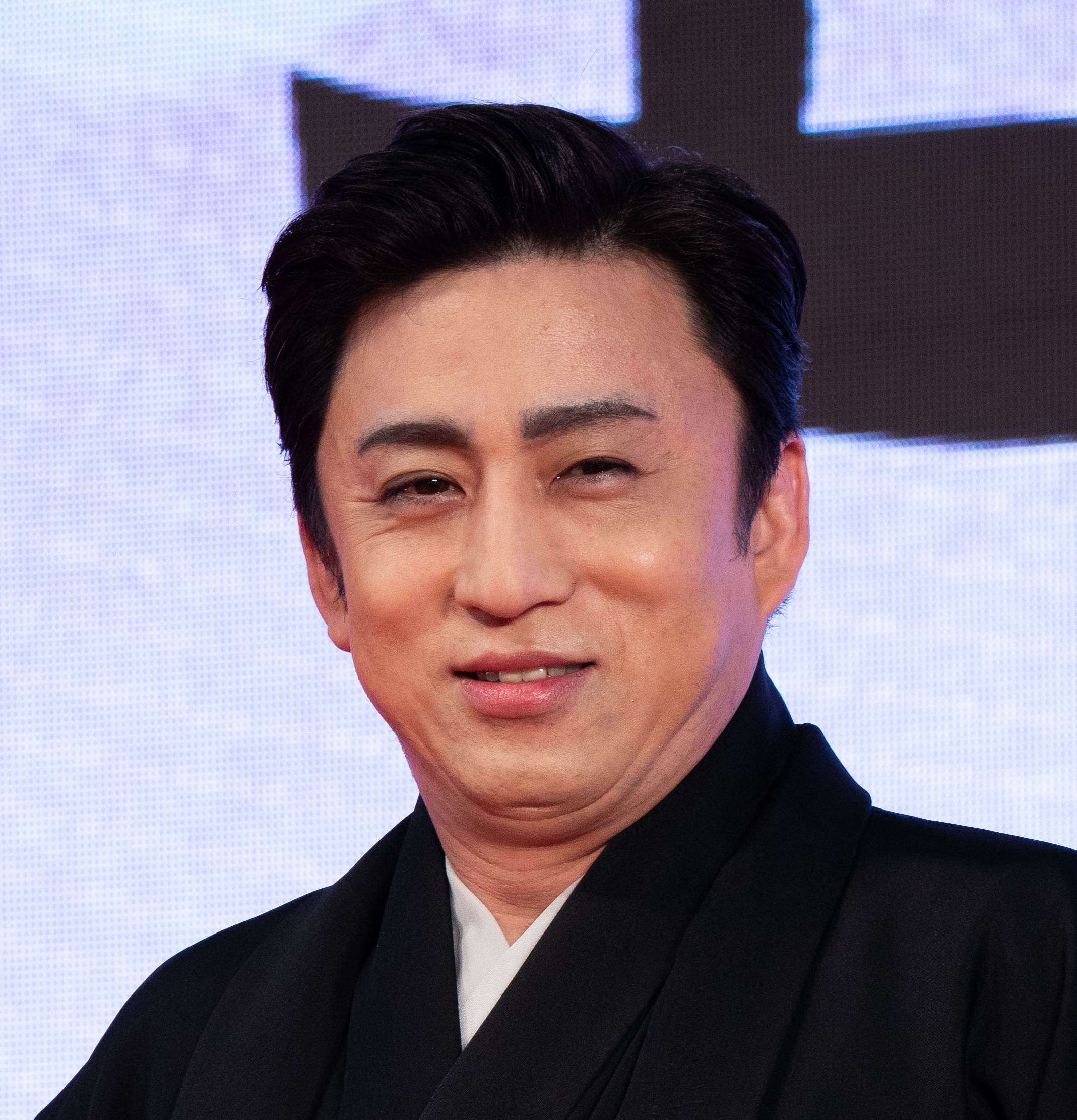
- Matsumoto Koshirō X at Tokyo International Film Festival in 2019
- Born: Terumasa Fujima; 8 January 1973 (age 53); Tokyo, Japan
- Other names: Matsumoto Kintarō III (三代目松本金太郎, Sandaime Matsumoto Kintarō) (as a child); Ichikawa Somegorō VII (七代目市川染五郎, Nanadaime Ichikawa Somegorō) (formerly); Matsumoto Kinshō (as a buyō dancer)
- Spouse: Sonoko Fujima (m. 2003)
- Children: Ichikawa Somegorō VIII (eldest son); Mio Matsuda (eldest daughter)
- Parents: Matsumoto Hakuō II (father); Noriko Fujima (mother)
- Relatives: Matsumoto Kōshirō VII (great-grandfather); Nakamura Kichiemon I (great-grandfather); Matsumoto Kōshirō VIII (grandfather); Nakamura Kichiemon II (uncle); Takako Matsu (sister); Kio Matsumoto (sister); Ichikawa Danjūrō XIII (cousin); Onoe Shoroku IV (cousin); Ōtani Hirotarō III (cousin); Ōtani Hiromatsu II (cousin)

Matsumoto Kōshirō X (十代目 松本幸四郎, Jūdaime Matsumoto Kōshirō; born January 8, 1973 in Tokyo) is a Japanese actor and kabuki actor. His yagō is the Kōraiya. His mon is the Mitsu Ichō, and his kaemon (the alternative emblem) is Yotsu Hana-bishi.

His buyō name is Matsumoto Kinshō (松本 錦升). His real name is Terumasa Fujima (藤間 照薫, Fujima Terumasa).

== Filmography ==
=== New kabuki ===
Title	Title	Role	Notes	Ref.
2015	Aterui	Aterui		
2016	Gensō Kami Kūkai: Shamonkūkai Tō no Kuni nite Oni to Utage su	Kūkai		

=== Television ===
Year	Title	Role	Notes	Ref.
1978	Ōgon no Hibi	Sukeza	Taiga drama	
2013	Yae's Sakura	Emperor Kōmei	Taiga drama	
2015	Inyōshi	Abe no Seimei	Lead role; Television film	
2024	Onihei Hankachō	Hasegawa "Onihei" Heizō	Lead role	

=== Films ===
Year	Title	Role	Notes	Ref.
2005	Ashura	Izumo Wakaraba	Lead role	
2005	The Samurai I Loved	Shiro Makibun	Lead role	
2016	Pokémon the Movie: Volcanion and the Mechanical Marvel	Volcanion (voice)		
2024	Samurai Detective Onihei: Blood for Blood	Hasegawa "Onihei" Heizō	Lead role	
2027	The Tiger and Her Wings: The Movie	Ikujiro Minami		

=== Video games ===
Year	Title	Role	Notes	Ref.
2001	Kessen II	Zhuge Liang		
