= Kizu Kōkichi =

Japanese photographer

- 木津 幸吉
- Born: February 8, 1830
- Died: September 27, 1895 (aged 65)

Kizu Kōkichi (木津 幸吉; February 8, 1830 – September 27, 1895) was a Japanese photographer. He was Hokkaido's first professional photographer.

== Life ==
Kizu was born in Echigo Province in 1830 and was a tailor by trade, based in Hakodate. Iosif Goshkevich, the Russian consul in Japan, visited his shop and asked him to make Western cloth. Although Kizu accepted his request, he took one of his suits as sample as he had never made Western suit. Thus, he made the first Western suit in Japan and expanded his business by specializing in this field.

After some time, Kizu traveled to his hometown in Echigo Province. He bought the camera he saw on the ship he was traveling in exchange for a bear skin. However, he did not manage to take a photo with the camera. Since Goshkevich was an amateur photographer, he asked him to teach him what he knew about photography when he returned to Hakodate. As Kizu's clothing business was failing, he decided to open his own photography studio in Hakodate in 1864.
