= Nakamura Kichiemon II =

Japanese actor (1944–2021)

Nakamura Kichiemon II 二代目中村吉右衛門
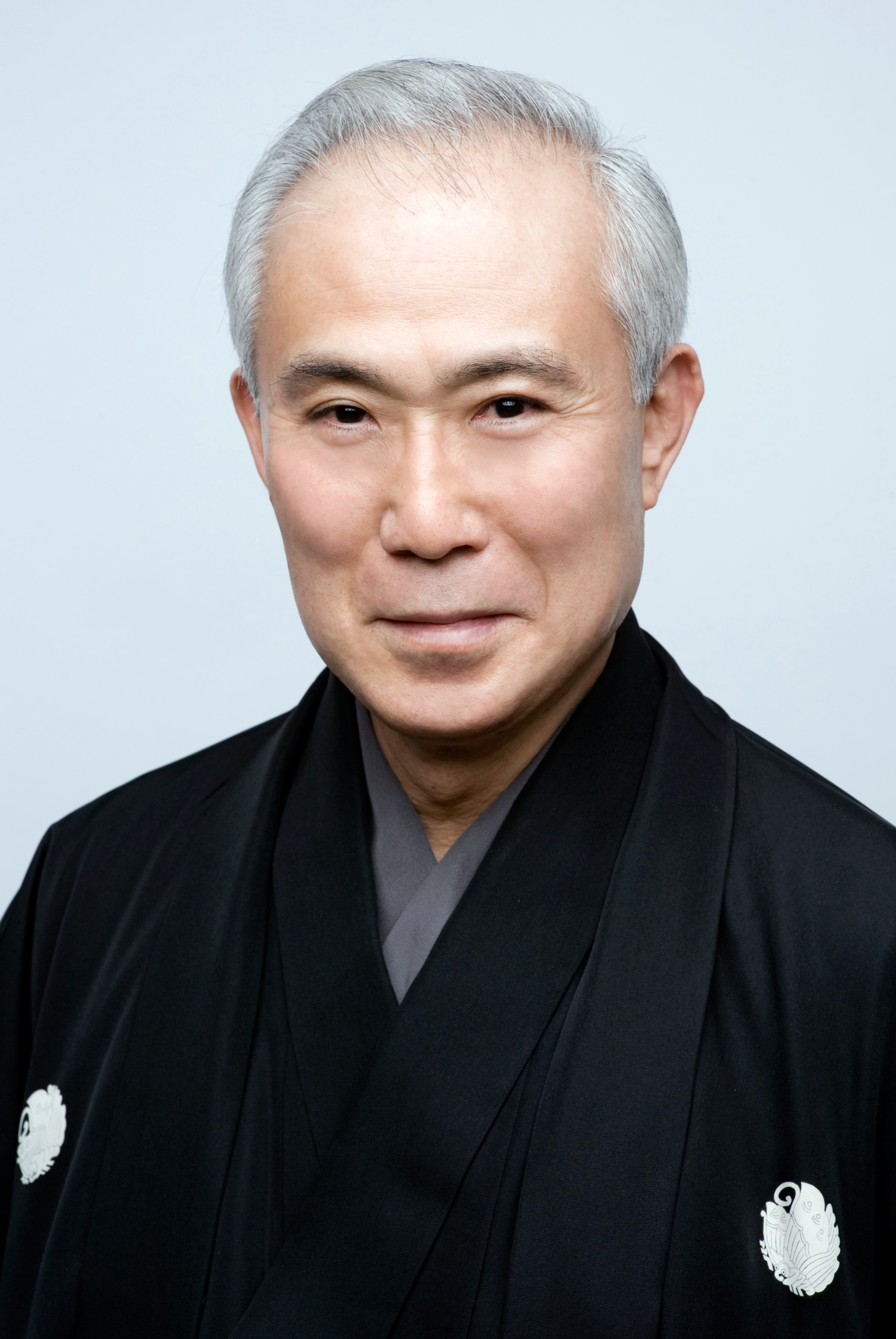
- Born: Tatsujirō Namino (Note: He shares the same birth name as his grandfather, Nakamura Kichiemon I.); 22 May 1944; Tokyo, Japan
- Died: 28 November 2021 (aged 77)
- Other names: Harimaya, Nakamura Mannosuke, Matsu Kanshi II
- Known for: Tachiyaku-roles
- Parent(s): Matsumoto Hakuō I (father); Masako Fujima (mother) (Note: Daughter of Nakamura Kichiemon I.)
- Relatives: Nakamura Karoku I (great-great-grandfather); Nakamura Karoku III (great-grandfather); Matsumoto Kōshirō VII (grandfather); Nakamura Kichiemon I (grandfather); Matsumoto Hakuō II (brother); Nakamura Kanzaburō XVIII (cousin); Yoko Namino (daughter); Matsumoto Kōshirō X (nephew); Ichikawa Somegorō VIII (grandnephew); Onoe Kikunosuke V (son-in-law) (Note: A popular Kabuki actor, he is the youngest son of famous Kabuki actor Onoe Kikugorō VII and actress Sumiko Fuji (a well-known Yakuza film actress) and the younger brother of award-winning actress Shinobu Terajima.); Onoe Ushinosuke VII (grandson) (Note: Son of Yoko Namino (Kichiemon II's daughter) and Onoe Kikunosuke V.)

Nakamura Kichiemon II (二代目 中村 吉右衛門, Nidaime Nakamura Kichiemon; 22 May 1944 – 28 November 2021) was a Japanese actor, kabuki performer and costume designer. He was a so-called Living National Treasure.

Nakamura Kichiemon was a formal kabuki stage name. The actor's grandfather first appeared using the name in 1897, and Nakamura Kichiemon I continued to use this name until his death. Kichiemon I was the maternal grandfather of Kichiemon II.

In the conservative Kabuki world, stage names are passed from father to son in a formal system which converts the kabuki stage name into a mark of accomplishment. In choosing to be known by the same stage name as his grandfather, the living kabuki performer honors his family relationships and tradition.

== Early life ==
Nakamura was born as Tatsujirō Namino in Kōjimachi, Chiyoda, Tokyo. His elder brother is Matsumoto Kōshirō IX. His father was Ichikawa Somegorō V, later known as Matsumoto Kōshirō VIII, and finally as Matsumoto Hakuō I. His mother was Seiko Fujima, Nakamura Kichiemon I's daughter and only child. According to Kichiemon II himself, his grandfather was "furious" and could not accept that his only child was a girl (because in Kabuki there are no actresses it meant that he could not give his name to his daughter), and treated her like a boy during her childhood. As a result, when she got married, Seiko promised her father that she would have at least two sons: the first would have carried his husband's traditions, while the second would have carried his name. She kept her promise and gave to adoption Kichiemon II to his grandfather. Unlike the most of Kabuki actors, who are only formally adopted when joining an acting family, he was legally adopted by his grandfather.

He attended Waseda University. His yagō is "Harimaya" and his crest is the ageha-no-chō butterfly of the Taira clan.

== Career ==
Active in kabuki and television, Kichiemon is famous in the role of Musashibō Benkei, whom he has portrayed on stage in Kanjinchō and Yoshitsune Senbon Zakura. He also played the title character in the NHK jidaigeki series Musashibō Benkei. Another heroic role was Ōboshi Yuranosuke (the historical Ōishi Kuranosuke) in Kanadehon Chūshingura, the story of the Forty-seven Ronin.

He assumed the television role of Hasegawa Heizō("Onihei") in the Shōtarō Ikenami series Onihei Hankachō. It ran through nine series, from 1989 to 2001, and has recurred in short series until 2016. His father had previously played Onihei.

== Later life ==
He died on 28 November 2021, at the age of 77.

== Selected works ==
Nakamura's published writings encompass 25 works in 34 publications in 3 languages and 543 library holdings.

- 2000 — Kichiemon's palette (吉右衛門のパレット /, Kichiemon no paretto) ISBN 9784104425013; OCLC 48917600
- 1996 — A long story (語り, monogatari) ISBN 9784838707089; OCLC 36046366

== Honors ==
- Japan Art Academy, 2002.
- Living National Treasure, 2011
- Person of Cultural Merit, 2017

== Filmography ==
| Date | Title | Type | Role | Notes |
|---|---|---|---|---|
| 1960 | The River Fuefuki | Film | Yasuzō | |
| 1962 | Chūshingura: Hana no Maki, Yuki no Maki | Film | Sanpei | |
| 1968 | Kuroneko | Film | Kindoki | Lead role |
| 1969 | Double Suicide | Film | Kamiya Jihei | Lead role |
| 1978 | Ogin-sama | Film | | |
| 1986 | Musashibō Benkei | TV | Benkei | Lead role |
| 1989 | Rikyu | Film | Tokugawa Ieyasu | |
| 1989–2016 | Onihei Hankachō | TV | Hasegawa "Onihei" Heizō | Lead role |
| 1995 | The Abe Clan | TV | Narrator | |
| 2014 | Zakurozaka no Adauchi | Film | Ii Naosuke | |

== See also ==
- Nakamura Kanzaburō
- Shūmei
