= Matsumoto Hakuō I =

Japanese kabuki actor (1910–1982)

Matsumoto Hakuō I 初代松本白鸚
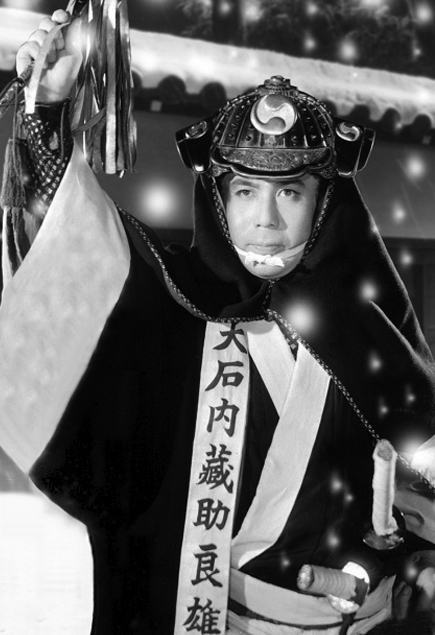
- Born: Junjirō Fujima; 7 July 1910; Tokyo, Japan
- Died: 11 January 1982 (aged 71); Tokyo, Japan
- Other names: Kōraiya, Matsumoto Sumizō II, Ichikawa Somegorō V, Matsumoto Kōshirō VIII
- Years active: 1926–1981
- Notable credit(s): Matsuōmaru (Sugawara Denju Tenarai Kagami), Kumagai Naozane (Kumagai Jinya), Ōtomo Kuronushi (Tsumoru Koi Yuki no Seki no To)
- Children: Matsumoto Hakuō II; Nakamura Kichiemon II
- Parent: Matsumoto Kōshirō VII
- Relatives: Onoe Shoroku II (brother); Ichikawa Danjūrō XI (brother)

Matsumoto Hakuō I (初代 松本 白鸚, Shodai Matsumoto Hakuō; 7 July 1910 – 11 January 1982), born Junjirō Fujima (藤間 順次郎, Fujima Junjirō), was a Japanese kabuki actor, regarded as the leading tachiyaku (specialist in male roles) of the postwar decades; he also performed in a number of non-kabuki venues, including Western theatre and films. Taking the name Hakuō upon retirement, he was known as Matsumoto Kōshirō VIII for much of his career.

== Names ==
Like most kabuki actors, Hakuō had a number of stage names (gō) over the course of his career. A member of the Koraiya guild, he would often be called by that name, particularly in the practice of kakegoe, in which an actor's guild name, yagō, or other phrases (e.g., jūnidaime, meaning "the twelfth") is shouted out as a cheer or encouragement during a performance. Originally appearing on stage as Matsumoto Sumizō II, he later took the names Ichikawa Somegorō V and Matsumoto Kōshirō VIII.

== Lineage ==
The son of Matsumoto Kōshirō VII and son-in-law of Nakamura Kichiemon I, the man who would later be called Hakuō was born into the kabuki world, and grew up in it. His brothers, Ichikawa Danjūrō XI and Onoe Shōroku II, were actors, as are his sons, Nakamura Kichiemon II and Matsumoto Kōshirō IX, and his grandson Ichikawa Somegorō VII (currently known as Matsumoto Kōshirō X).

== Life and career ==
After making his first stage appearance in 1925, at the age of fifteen, under the name Matsumoto Sumizō II, he took the name Ichikawa Somegorō V in 1931. In 1949, when Somegorō was 39, his father, Kōshirō VII, died, and the actor took his father's name at a shūmei (naming ceremony) a few months later, becoming the eighth Matsumoto Kōshirō. The ceremony was held at the Kabuki-za in Tokyo, and featured the play Kanjinchō, in which Kōshirō VIII played Benkei and Higuchi Jirō Kanemitsu.

His film credits include Emperor Hirohito in Japan's Longest Day (日本のいちばん長い日, Nihon no ichiban nagai hi), in which Toshirō Mifune played General Korechika Anami, Ii Naosuke in Samurai Assassin (侍, Samurai), and a number of other jidaigeki (samurai period films).

Kôshirō was named a Living National Treasure in 1975, a rare and very illustrious honor awarded in Japan to those who embody, promote, and preserve traditional culture. He retired six years later, in 1981, taking on the name Hakuō in retirement and passing on the name Kōshirō to his son.

Hakuō died the following year, on 11 January 1982.

== Honours ==
- Medal with Purple Ribbon (1972)
- Living National Treasure (1975)
- Person of Cultural Merit (1978)
- Order of Culture (1981)

== Partial filmography ==
Films

- Teki wa Hon'nō-ji ni Ari (1960) - Akechi Mitsuhide
- The River Fuefuki (1960) - Uesugi Kenshin
- Yato kaze no naka o hashiru (1961) - Tasaka, shôgen
- Chūshingura: Hana no Maki, Yuki no Maki (1962) - Ōishi Kuranosuke
- Samurai Assassin (1965) - Lord Naosuke Ii
- Japan's Longest Day (1967) - Emperor Hirohito
- Admiral Yamamoto (1968) - Mitsumasa Yonai
- Chōkōsō no Akebono (1969) - Hideo Edo
- Battle of the Japan Sea (1969) - Emperor Meiji
- Bandits vs. Samurai Squadron (1978) - Kuranosuke Tsuji

Television

- Onihei Hankachō (1969–72) - Hasegawa "Onihei" Heizō
- Daichūshingura (1971)
- Ōgon no Hibi (1978)

== See also ==
- Matsumoto Kōshirō - line of kabuki actors
