= Matsumoto Hakuō II =

Japanese kabuki actor (born 1942)

Matsumoto Hakuō II ニ代目 松本白鸚
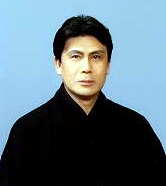
- Born: Teruaki Fujima; 19 August 1942 (age 84); Tokyo, Japan
- Other names: Kōraiya, Ichikawa Somegorō VI, Matsumoto Kintarō II
- Children: Matsumoto Koshirō X Kio Matsumoto; Takako Matsu
- Father: Matsumoto Hakuō I
- Relatives: Nakamura Kichiemon II (brother); Ichikawa Danjūrō XII (cousin); Onoe Tatsunosuke I (cousin); Ōtani Tomoemon VIII (cousin); Nakamura Jakuemon V (cousin)

Matsumoto Hakuō II (ニ代目 松本 白鸚, Nidaime Matsumoto Hakuō; born August 19, 1942) is a Japanese kabuki actor, one of the most popular tachiyaku (specialist in male roles) currently performing.

Like many members of the kabuki community, he can trace his lineage back several generations, many members of his family being kabuki actors as well. His father and grandfather were the eighth and seventh, respectively, to hold the name of Matsumoto Kōshirō, and he traces his lineage back to his great-great-grandfather Nakamura Karoku I, if not further. Kōshirō's brother, Nakamura Kichiemon II, son Matsumoto Koshirō X and grandson Ichikawa Somegorō VIII are active in the kabuki theater as well, and his daughter, Takako Matsu is an experienced film actress. In addition, Kōshirō has a number of disciples, including Matsumoto Kingo III, Matsumoto Kōemon I, and Ichikawa Komazō XI.

== Life and career ==
He made his stage debut in 1945, at the age of three, under the name Matsumoto Kintarō II, and took the name Ichikawa Somegorō VI four years later. He succeeded his father to the name Matsumoto Kōshirō in 1981.

A graduate of Waseda University, and a versatile actor, Kōshirō IX has performed extensively not only in kabuki, but in Western stage plays, film, and television. He has played, among many other roles, Benkei in Kanjinchō, Kōchiyama Sōshun in Kōchiyama, Kumagai Jirō Naozane in Kumagai Jinya, and Matsuōmaru in Sugawara Denju Tenarai Kagami.

In 1970, Kōshirō appeared in the lead role in Man of La Mancha on Broadway in New York. Also, he has appeared as the King of Siam in The King and I in the West End in London. Other stage roles have included Motl in Fiddler on the Roof, the title role in Sweeney Todd, Salieri in Amadeus, Kitagawa Utamaro in the musical Utamaro, and Zeami Motokiyo in Musical Zeami.

== Filmography ==
=== Film ===
- Whirlwind (1964) – Jūbei
- Nichiren (1979) – Hōjō Tokiyori
- Final Take (1986) – Shirota
- April Story (1998) – Uzuki's father
- 13 Assassins (2010) – Makino Yukie
- Tenchi: The Samurai Astronomer (2012) – Hoshina Masayuki
- Suzume (2022) – Hitsujirō Munakata (voice)

=== Television ===
- Ōgon no Hibi (1978) – Luzon Sukezaemon
- Sanga Moyu (1984) – Kenji Amō
- Hana no Ran (1994) – Shuten-dōji
- Furuhata Ninzaburō Special(2004) - His Excellency Ambassador Takechiyo Mayuzumi
- Sanada Maru (2016) – Luzon Sukezaemon

=== Japanese dub ===
- The Jungle Book (2016) – Baloo (voice-over for Bill Murray)

== Honors ==
- Kikuchi Kan Prize (2002)
- Japan Art Academy (2002)
- Medal with Purple Ribbon (2005)
- Person of Cultural Merit (2012)
- Order of Culture (2022)

== See also ==
- Matsumoto Kōshirō - series of actors holding this name
