= Shinsuke Mikimoto =

Japanese actor (1931–2002)

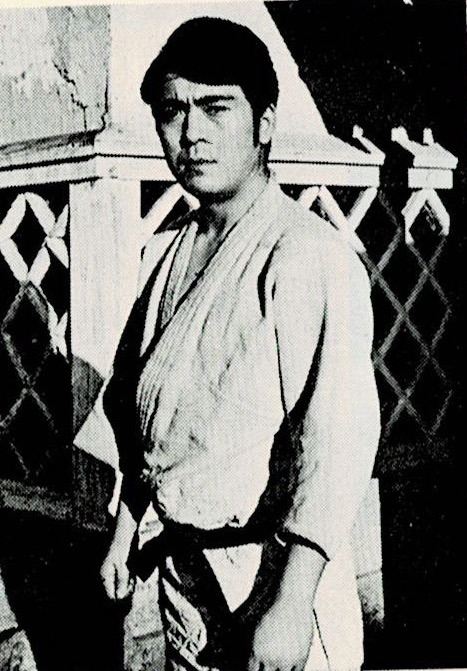
- Born: Mikimoto Shinsuke; May 22, 1931
- Died: August 5, 2002 (aged 71)
- Occupation: Actor
- Years active: 1953–2002

Shinsuke Mikimoto (御木本伸介, Mikimoto Shinsuke; May 22, 1931–August 5, 2002) was a Japanese actor. His credits include at least fifty films, as well as numerous television appearances, in a career that spanned several decades.His real name is Syuichi Suzuki.The Suzuki family on his father's side is a family that served as the palace doctor of the Kaga Maeda family for generation.

== Education ==
Born in Kanazawa, he graduated from high school there. Then he attended Rikkyo University in Tokyo, graduating from the Faculty of Economics.

== Career ==
Mikimoto made his debut in 1953 as a small role of "Battleship Yamato" directed by Yutaka Abe. As a movie actor, his acting ability was highly evaluated, but he was not blessed with his work.

In 1962, he starred in the TV drama "Judo Ichidai（柔道一代）," which featured Jigoro Kano, the founder of judo. This show has gained great popularity and he became a popular actor. In 1964, he also starred in Nagisa Oshima's only TV drama, "Asia no Akebono（アジアの曙）".

Primarily a supporting actor, Mikimoto frequently appeared as a bad guy in jidaigeki on television and in film. Additionally, he took roles such as Kiyokawa Hachirō in Moeyo Ken, a prime-time bakumatsu story on NET in 1970. He played Ōtaka Tadao (Gengo), one of the Forty-seven Ronin, in the 1971 Daichūshingura starring Toshirō Mifune. Another historical role was Hirate Masahide in the NHK Taiga drama Takeda Shingen.

Mikimoto mostly took parts as fictional characters. His career includes seven appearances on Mito Kōmon, spanning the years from 1978 to 1994. Many other long-running jidaigeki cast Mikimoto in guest-star roles, among them Abarenbō Shōgun, Zenigata Heiji, Onihei Hankachō (on which he was also a regular character), Ōoka Echizen, and Chōshichirō Edo Nikki.

In film, Mikimoto appeared in Gion Matsuri (1968) with Kinnosuke Nakamura and Toshiro Mifune; The Fall of Ako Castle (1978), directed by Kinji Fukasaku and starring Nakamura, Mifune, and Sonny Chiba; and films set in modern times such as Zero Fighter Burns and the 1986 The Return of Godzilla with Raymond Burr and Japan Academy Prize-winning actress Yasuko Sawaguchi.

He was also an important supporting actor in Yorozuya Kinnosuke's stage performances.

== Death ==
Mikimoto died of lung cancer on August 5, 2002. He was 71 years old.

== Filmography ==
=== Film ===
- Nude Actress Murder Case: Five Criminals (1957) – Morimoto
- Shinsengumi (1969) – Kiyokawa Hachirō
- Bakumatsu (1970) – Kido Takayoshi
- The Fall of Ako Castle (1978) – Tsuchiya Masanao
- Nichiren (1979)

=== Television ===
- Bakumatsu (1964, TBS) – Kido Takayoshi
- Emperor Meiji (1966, YTV) – Kido Takayoshi
- San Shimai (1967, NHK) – Kido Takayoshi
- Tokugawa Ieyasu (1983, NHK) – Mōri Terumoto
- Takeda Shingen (1988, NHK) – Hirate Masahide

== Sources ==
This article incorporates material from 御木本伸介 (Mikimoto Shinsuke) in the Japanese Wikipedia, retrieved on March 15, 2008.
