= Yōko Mihara =

Japanese actress (1933–2013)

- Born: 10 January 1933; Morioka, Iwate, Japan
- Died: 1 July 2013 (aged 80); Fussa-shi, Tokyo, Japan
- Years active: 1951–1977

Yōko Mihara (三原 葉子, Mihara Yōko) was an actress of Japanese exploitation cinema, erotic dancer and pin-up model who was active from the 1950s to 1970s.

== Life and career ==
Mihara signed up with Shintoho in 1951 but appeared mostly in minor roles, pursuing the career of a pin-up model and stripper, until her role as the lead actress in Teruo Ishii's 1957 film Nude Actress Murder Case: Five Criminals. The following year, Shintoho made Mihara the star of their low-budget ama series in place of Michiko Maeda. She first appeared in Yoshiki Onoda's Cannibal Ama (1958) followed by the 1959 Girl Divers at Spook Mansion.

Following Shintoho's bankruptcy in 1961, Mihara worked almost exclusively for Toei, including four films in Ishii's Abashiri Prison yakuza film series in 1966 and 1967 and later in their onsen geisha sexploitation films, eventually becoming a staple actress of the studio's "pinky violence" subgenre by the early 1970s.

== Selected filmography ==
- Nude Actress Murder Case: Five Criminals (1957)
- Cannibal Ama (1958)
- Kenpei to yurei (1958)
- Soldiers' Girls (女の防波堤 Onna no bōhatei) (1958)
- Pier of Woman Body (女体棧橋 Nyotai sanbashi) (1958)
- Girl Divers at Spook Mansion (海女の化物屋敷 Ama no bakemono yashiki) (1959)
- The Catch (1961)
- Sexy Line (セクシー地帯 Sekushii chitai) (1961)
- Sword of the Beast (1965)
- Rampaging Dragon of the North (1966)
- Abashiri Prison: Duel in the Wilderness (網走番外地 荒野の対決 Abashiri Bangaichi: Koya no taiketsu) (1966)
- Abashiri Prison: Duel in the South (網走番外地 南国の対決 Abashiri Bangaichi: Nangoku no taiketsu) (1966)
- Abashiri Prison: Duel at 30 Degrees Below Zero (網走番外地 決斗零下30度 Abashiri Bangaichi: Ketto reika sanjū-do) (1967)
- Abashiri Prison: Fight against Vice (網走番外地 悪への挑戦 Abashiri Bangaichi: Aku e no Chōsen) (1967)
- Blackmail Is My Life (1968)
- Hot Springs Geisha (温泉あんま芸者 Onsen anma geisha) (1968)
- Hot Springs Kiss Geisha (温泉スッポン芸者 Onsen suppon geisha) (1972)
- Sex & Fury (不良姐御伝 猪の鹿お蝶 Furyō anego den: Inoshika o-Chō) (1973)
- School of the Holy Beast (聖獣学園 Seijū gakuen) (1974)
- Zero Woman: Red Handcuffs (0課の女 赤い手錠 Zeroka no onna: Akai wappa) (1974)
