= Onihei Hankachō (1975 TV series) =

- Also known as: 鬼平犯科帳
- Genre: Jidaigeki
- Directed by: Masahiro Takase; Yoshiki Onoda
- Starring: Tetsuro Tamba; Takahiro Tamura; Akihiko Hirata; Ichirō Nakatani; Kojiro Hongo; Hiroshi Koizumi; Yōko Nogiwa
- Theme music composer: Takeo Yamashita
- Country of origin: Japan
- Original language: Japanese
- No. of episodes: 26

Production
- Producer: Hisao Ichikawa
- Running time: 45 minutes (per episode)
- Production companies: NET; Toho

Original release
- Network: ANN (NET)
- Release: April 1975 – September 1975

Onihei Hankachō (鬼平犯科帳) is a Japanese television jidaigeki or period drama that was broadcast in 1975. It is based on Shōtarō Ikenami's novel by the same title. Tetsuro Tamba plays the role of Heizō Hasegawa.

== Plot ==
The Tokugawa shogunate set special police called Hitsuke Tozoku aratamegata to crack down on crimes. Hasegawa Heizō is a chief of Hitsuke Tōzoku Aratamegata. He is a talented man and feared like an oni by thieves. On the other hand, he is a man with big heart, and some former thieves impressed by his personality are now working for him. Hasegawa and his subordinates help each other to arrest thieves.

== Cast ==
- Tetsuro Tamba as Hasegawa Heizō (Onihei)
- Ichirō Nakatani as Izeki Rokunosuke
- Yoko Nogiwa as Omasa
- Katsutoshi Arata as Kumehachi
- Takahiro Tamura as Kishii Samanosuke
- Kayo Matsuo as Otaki
- Akio Hasegawa as Harada
- Kokonte Shinshō as Kimura Chūgo (Usagi)
- Ryōhei Uchida as Ōtaki no Gorozō
- Hiroshi Koizumi as Sashima Tadasuke
- Akihiko Hirata as Kyōgoku Bizen

== See also ==
- Onihei Hankachō
- Onihei Hankachō(1989 TV)
