= Kenkaku Shōbai =

Fictional samurai novel

- Author: Shōtarō Ikenami
- Original title: 剣客商売 (Kenkaku Shōbai)
- Language: Japanese
- Publisher: Shinchosha
- Publication place: Japan

Kenkaku Shōbai (剣客商売, Kenkaku Shōbai) is a series of popular historical novels written by Shōtarō Ikenami and one of the representative novels of Ikenami along with Onihei Hankachō and Shikakenin Fujieda Baian. The stories were originally serialized in the monthly magazine Shōsetsu Shinchō between 1972 and 1989. Sixteen full-length novels were published from Shinchosha between 1973 and 1989. Kenkaku Shōbai was also adapted into TV programs and manga series.

== Characters ==
- Kohei Akiyama (秋山 小兵衛, Akiyama Kohei): The main character Akiyama Kohei is a master of Mugai ryu but he is spending his retired life. Though Kohei is old, he is still a skilled swordsman.
- Daijirō Akiyama (秋山 大治郎, Akiyama Daijirō) : Kohei's son who manages school of swordplay.
- Oharu (おはる, Oharu): Kohei's wife. She is 40 years younger than Kohei.
- Mifuyu Sasaki (佐々木 三冬, Sasaki Mifuyu)
- Okitsugu Tanuma (田沼 意次, Tanuma Okitsugu)

== Novels ==
- Kenkaku Shōbai (剣客商売) (1973)
- Kenkaku Shōbai Tsujigiri (剣客商売 辻斬り) (1973)
- Kenkaku Shōbai Kagero no Otoko (剣客商売 陽炎の男) (1973)
- Kenkaku Shōbai Tenma (剣客商売 天魔) (1974)
- Kenkaku Shōbai Shiroi Oni (剣客商売 白い鬼) (1975)
- Kenkaku Shōbai Niizuma (剣客商売 新妻) (1976)
- Kenkaku Shōbai Kakuremino (剣客商売 隠れ簑) (1976)
- Kenkaku Shōbai Kyōran (剣客商売 狂乱) (1977)
- Kenkaku Shōbai Machibuse (剣客商売 待ち伏せ) (1978)
- Kenkaku Shōbai Haru no Arashi (剣客商売 春の嵐) (1978)
- Kenkaku Shōbai Shōbu (剣客商売 勝負) (1979)
- Kenkaku Shōbai Jyubangiri (剣客商売 十番斬り) (1980)
- Kenkaku Shōbai Hamon (剣客商売 波紋) (1983)
- Kenkaku Shōbai Ansatsusha (剣客商売 暗殺者) (1985)
- Kenkaku Shōbai Nijyubangiri (剣客商売 二十番斬り) (1987)
- Kenkaku Shōbai Chinmoku (剣客商売 浮沈) (1989)

== Adaptation ==
=== Television ===
- Kenkaku Shōbai (1973), a Fuji TV production, Isao Yamagata as Akiyama Kohei and Gō Katō as Akiyama Daijirō.
- Kenkaku Shōbai (1998–2010) a Fuji TV production, Makoto Fujita played the role of Akiyama Kohei
- Kenkaku Shōbai (2012), a Fuji TV production, Kin'ya Kitaōji played the role of Akiyama Kohei

=== Manga ===
- Professional Swordsmen of the Edo Era (1998–1999), Illustrated by Takao Saito
- Kenkaku Shōbai (2008–present), Illustrated by Yasuichi Oshima
