= Sanada Taiheiki (novel) =

Fictional samurai novel by Shōtarō Ikenami

- Author: Shōtarō Ikenami
- Original title: 真田太平記 (Sanada Taiheiki)
- Language: Japanese
- Publisher: Asahi Shimbun Sha
- Publication place: Japan

Sanada Taiheiki (真田太平記, Sanada Taiheiki) is jidaigeki novel written by Shōtarō Ikenami. The novel deals with the Sanada clan during the Warring States period in Japan The stories were originally serialized as a serial in the Japanese magazine Shūkan Asahi between 1974 and 1982. The novel was adapted into a television series in 1985 and a manga series.

Shōtarō Ikenami Sanada Taiheiki Museum was opened in Ueda, Nagano in 1998.

== Adaptation ==
- Sanada Taiheiki (1985)
