= Hitogui Ama =

- Directed by: Yoshiki Onoda
- Written by: Hiroshi Shihara (story); Yūsake Watanabe; Shigeru Kawakami
- Produced by: Mitsugu Ōkura
- Starring: Yōko Mihara; Ken Utsui
- Cinematography: Mamoru Morita
- Music by: Chūmei Watanabe
- Distributed by: Shintoho
- Release date: July 27, 1958
- Running time: 74 min.
- Country: Japan
- Language: Japanese

Cannibal Ama (人喰海女, Hitogui Ama) is a 1958 Japanese film directed by Yoshiki Onoda and starring Yōko Mihara. The film marked Mihara's debut as the star of Shintoho's series of ama films, a role she took over from Michiko Maeda. The film has never been released on home video, but is not lost as some sources claim.

== Cast ==
- Yōko Mihara (三原葉子): Sada
- Ken Utsui (宇津井健): Gorō Negishi
- Kyōko Yashiro (矢代京子): Izumi
- Tetsurō Tamba: Miyata
- Utako Mitsuya (三ツ矢歌子): Kazue
- Masayo Banri (万里昌代): Tomi
- Keiko Minakami (水上恵子): Aki
- Akihiko Hirata (平田昭彦): Makino
