= Shōtarō Ikenami =

Japanese author (1923–1990)

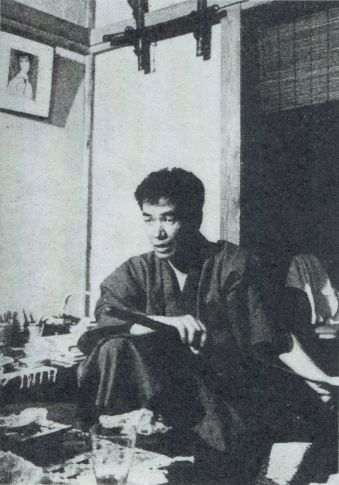
Shōtarō Ikenami

Shōtarō Ikenami (池波 正太郎, Ikenami Shōtarō; January 25, 1923 – May 3, 1990) was a Japanese author. He wrote a number of historical novels. He won the Naoki Award for popular literature in 1960. Many of his historical novels were adapted for TV and cinema.

== Life ==
Ikenami was born on January 25, 1923, in Shintencho, Asakusa-ku, Tokyo (now 7-chome Asakusa, Taito-ku, Tokyo). His father, Tomijiro, was a clerk at a Nihonbashi tinsel wholesaler. His mother, Suzu Kyosan, was the third daughter of an Asakusa craftsman. She specialized in the creation of metal ornaments. Shotaro was their eldest son.

During the Great Kanto Earthquake, he moved to Urawa, Saitama, with his parents, and stayed there until the age of six (1929). Eventually, his parents moved back to Tokyo, where Ikenami entered Negishi Elementary School. Tomijiro, whose business was unsatisfactory, opened a ballpark at Shimotani Kaminegishi with the investment of his close relatives. However, Ikenami's parents divorced that year due to marital discord.

Shotaro was placed in the care of his mother and moved to his grandfather's house in Asakusa Eijucho, and moved to Nishitachi Elementary School in Shimotani. Grandfather Imai Kyosan is Gokenin in the house of adoption in the person of craftsman-Edo temperament was filled, and cherish the Shotaro on behalf of a busy mother. During this time, while working, she supported the family of the Imai family and remarried with a temporary leave of Shotaro, but she was unrelated and returned to her parents' home. With this second marriage, Shotaro has a single brother-in-law.

1935 (Showa 10 years), graduated from West Town Elementary School. The teacher instructed her to go on to school, but she went to service because of family circumstances. Relatives helped him first go to the stock exchange and Tasaki Shoten, but in less than six months he changed his position to a paint shop and then retired to the stock broker and Matsushima Shoten. After that, he stayed there until he entered the National Labor Training Institute in 1942 . He used his chips and pocket money to raise secret prices and earn more than his monthly salary. Shotaro in the Kabutocho era used this as "military funding", reading books, movies, watching theater, enjoying mountain climbing and traveling, going to the sword art dojo, eating and walking around, and indulging in Yoshiwara . During this period, not only did he become more interested in reading and movies, but he also actively watched Kabuki, the New Kingdom, and the new drama, and even learned Nagauta to deepen his understanding of Kabuki .

=== World War II ===
In 1941 (Showa 16), the Pacific War broke out. The following year he retired from Matsushima Shoten and joined the National Labor Training Institute. During the same year, he was assigned to Shibaura and Kayaba Works, where he trained as a lathe mechanic. The director, who was planning to be in charge of accounting for the first time, placed Ikenami in charge of the site, and in a few months, with the careful guidance of his boss, he mastered this technology. Around this time, he published short stories in the reading section of " Ladies Pictorial." Out of them, "Holiday" received an Outstanding Honorable Mention (May 1943), "Return of My Brother" was Winner (July July), "Driving" received an Honorable Mention (November Issue), and "Snow" a Selected Honorable mention (December issue). He earned a prize of 50 yen for "Return of My Brother," his first manuscript income.

In the winter of 1943 (Showa 18), he was transferred to a factory in Gifu-Ota, where he also worked as a lathe educator. The following year, on New Year's Day, he reunited with his father who had been recruited to a steel mill in Nagoya for the first time in a long time. On a holiday, he toured the mountains in the Chubu region and went to Tokyo to see Kabuki. The year after, he finally retired from the factory when a wage warrant was issued to Shotaro, who had reached adulthood. In April, he joined the Yokosuka Marine Corps . Soon he entered the driving school in the Takeyama Marine Corps. However, he rebelled against the instructor's violent teaching methods, was repeatedly disciplined, and left without completing the school. He was transferred to Isogo's Eighty-First Sky and was in charge of communications duties (telephone exchange). On March 10 1945, his house in Eijucho was burned due to the Tokyo air raid. Then, sailors length was promoted to, Yonago of Miho air base transferees to. He became the head of the telephone exchange office in the same area. The worsening of the war situation, nationwide. Amidst the danger of air raids, Yonago enjoyed relatively peaceful days, and during this time, Shotaro was passionate about making haiku and tanka in his spare time . August 15 defeat. Advance to Sergeant Second Class . After returning to Tokyo, he will return to Tokyo on August 24 .

=== As a playwright ===
Immediately after returning to Tokyo, in October 1945, he saw the sixth generation Kikugoro Onoe 's Ginza Revival at the Imperial Theater . 1946 (1946), Tokyo becomes the staff Shitaya Ward worked in public office, but the work is student part-time job in various places with DDT was to go around spraying. He had already lost his home due to a raid, and because the landlord of the rented house returned from the evacuation area, he stayed in the government office and immersed himself in work, while playing for the Yomiuri Shimbun Drama Culture Prize, which was established this year. Authored "Snowy Sunny". The work won the fourth place in the selection and was performed by the New Kyogekidan . The following year, while continuing to work at the ward office, he won the prize for the honorable mention at the South Wind Blowing Window.

In 1948 (Showa 23), he visited Shin Hasegawa for the first time after studying . From the following year, he studied dramatic works in earnest, and also participated in a criticism meeting under his ancestor, the 26th day meeting. The work before and after this includes "Peonyeon", "Hand" and "Moth". "Hand" was considered to be performed in the Shinkoku drama. In 1950 (Showa 25), he married Toyoko Kataoka and rented a house, but he won a lottery that he had applied for soon, and he got a new house with the performance fee of "Dark beef" performed in the Shinkoku drama. Built. Since then, Shotaro, who has deepened his relationship with the New Kingdom drama, is said to be a seated writer, while providing Tatsumi Yanagitaro and Shimada Shogo with "In the Cage" (1952) and " Watanabe Kazan " (1953), Even in novels, Hasegawa strongly recommended novels such as "In the Kitchen" (1954) in Shintakakai 's magazine "Daisen Literature" .

==== To the novelist ====
In January 1955, Nayoroiwa, one of the masterpieces of the play, was staged and directed by himself . By this, I finally retired the Tokyo staff with the confidence that I could stand by writing (I refused promotion, I was devoted to outside work, and at that time I was collecting taxes at the Meguro tax office). "The following year Tomitaro Makino," Yasushi Inoue "of the original Furinkazan such as", "Kurokumotani," "Zokusho", while staged one after another works in Shinkokugeki, continue asked regularly novel in the journal "public literary" Was. In the early days, there were many contemporary works, but the November and December 1956 edition of Onda Woodwork (Sanada Riot) put historical and period novels at the center of writing. The following year, Onda Woodwork was a candidate for the Naoki Prize in the second half of 1957, but was rejected. Since then, he has been writing novels steadily in parallel with his plays. In September 1959, he published his virginity book, Shinano Daimiki, from Koshobo. During this time, the Naoki Prize was selected five times for "Eye" (first half of 1957), "Shinano Daimyo" (second half of the same year), "Onin no Ran" (second half of 1958), and "Hizu" (first half of 1959), The selection committee member, Shigoro Kaionji, received a bad reputation and did not win the award. 1958 in private lifeIn 1958, he met his father, who had lost his communication since he met in Nagoya just before his departure. Shotaro suggested she live with her mother, but she was not heard.

In 1960, he was awarded the Naoki Prize (1st half) for "Confusion". Hasegawa was delighted like me, and Shotaro was also handed a prize by Jiro Daibutsu, a favorite reader since his youth . Within a few years after receiving the award, he wrote screenplays for "Shikamizu Kazuki" and "Kaga Uproar", "The Man in the North Sea" ("All Readings", October 60), "The Woman of the Demon Lord" ("Weekly Mass" 11 July 7), "The Last Journey to Uden" ("Shinbunsho Shincho", January 1986), "Color" ("All Readings", August of the same year), "Fire Extinguisher" ("Shinkiso Novell") 62, January), "human sword Hanjiro" ("Asahi Performing arts" the same year October 28 issue - 64 years January 26 issue), "pock MataJuro" ("reasoning stream" 63, January), "Samurai's Nest" ("Bungei Asahi", June of the same year), "Bakumatsu Shinsengumi" ("Earth" January–March, 1964), "Bakumatsu Yukitai" ("Weekly Yomiuri", same year 8) A series of early masterpiece novels were published one after another, including the March 4 issue- December 29 issue, of which "Color" was made into a movie under the title of "Ishin no Bonfire" (1961). On the other hand, as the playwright 1963 for Shinkokugeki in (1963) Hiroshi Shimozawa After performing the adaptation of the original "man hawk", cut off the relationship for a while theater-Shinkokugeki, so as to concentrate on the novel Was. It was due to questions about the new country drama and friction with the surroundings due to the dedication of Shotaro. same year. On June 11, Shin Hasegawa died, but at the same time he left the 26th-day meeting and Shintaka-kai. Since then, he has continued writing without belonging to any organization.

===== Onihei crime book =====
Shotaro, who entered the forties, published "Edo Phantom Thief" (" Weekly Shincho ", January 6, 64 issue), "Osen" ("Novel Hyundai", July of the same year), and "Horibe Yasubei" (" China "). " Newspaper " May 14- May 24, 1966), "Debauchi Odama" ("Novel Contemporary", March 1965), "Domon Feast" ("All Reading", September 1965), In addition to conventional historical novels such as "Ahogarasu" ("Novel Shincho", July 67 issue), he began to work on a number of period novels that featured the subject of Ichii in Edo, especially in 1967 (In 1967, "Asakusa Gourmet Riverside," which was published in December's "All Readings," received high praise from readers, and began to be serialized as a series intermittently in the next issue. It is the first work of "Onihei Crime Book " which became one of the representative works later . Hiromasa ShigeshouI was very interested in the person Hirakawa Heizo who I met in the family records, but based on the old knowledge of Koshiro Yatsushiro Matsumoto as a model, I portrayed Heizo who has strong leadership and affection through the good and evil of the world. as well as, arson thieves break how "to do bad with the good" through the conflict between the thieves to draw the human contradiction. It received widespread support from readers as a villain novel. Historic novels at the same time include "Samurai Theater" ("Weekly Sankei", August 22, 1966- July 17, 67), "Isemori Kamiizumi (Tenchi no Tenchi)" ("Weekly Asahi", 67 April 28 issue - June 16 issue), "butterfly wing" ("Shinanomainichishinbun" in addition to the same year April 30 – 68 years March 31, 2008), "Isami Kondo dictionary" ("new criticism" October 1-March 1969). Although he stayed up in the daytime and continued to write in the middle of the night, he was originally a fast-paced writer and traveled vigorously, including interviews, during his work, and he enjoyed watching movies and theater.

He wrote an autobiographical essay, "Youth Forgotten Things" ("Novel Shincho", January–December, 1968) at the request of the editor in charge in 1968 (Showa 43). He introduced a fictional character named his old friend Rueyoshi Inoue, but this work, which drew memories of the youth era, who enjoyed theater, reading, traveling, eating and walking, was set in Kabutocho before the war and received strong support from readers. . The following day, in 1969 (Showa 44), "Onihei Crime Book" was made into a serial drama on NET TV, and in 1971 (Showa 46), "Kituki" was set in the series. Each starring star is Matsumoto Hakuō I, and especially the television version was highly evaluated as a work of the era, and the subsequent evaluation was immovable. The serialization of "Kihei" is still strong in the "All Readings" magazine, and after the first volume of the book was published in 1968, "Koujoken" (69), "Blood Fighting" (70), " New works were released to the world at the pace of the book, Fox Fire (71) and Meteor (72). Also in the works of Edo of the street was the stage, Banzuiin Chōbei drew a "martial arts" ("Sankei Sports" 68 years October 28 – 69 years September 5), Chushingura "Amigasa Jūbei" were interviewed (" "Weekly Shincho", May 31, 1969- May 16, 1970), "Ore no Footsteps" featuring the built-in assistant Oishi ("Tokyo Shimbun" and 70 years)March 20- June 17, 71) and other works were announced.

====== Swordsman business and in-process person ======
In 1972, "Shikakenin Fujieda Baian" was made into a serial drama " Hissatsu Shikakenin" on TV Asahi and the drama recorded high audience rating. He published " Swordsman Business " in the January issue of "Novel Shincho" . Modeled on Kabuki actor Nakamura Matagoro, the second generation who happened to see at a secondhand bookstore in Kyoto, he drew an old swordsman, Akiyama Kohei who retired as a couple with a girl like a grandson. The series, in which the eldest son, Daijiro and the daughter of Yinji Tanuma, a female swordsman, Miyuki Sasaki, were set up to solve the incident that occurred in Ichi, Edo, also gained popularity. In the same year, in the March issue of "Novel Contemporary", "Onnagoshi" was announced as the first work in the " Work-in-Progress, Fujieda Umeyasu " series. In the June issue of the magazine, his second work, The Four Killings, was awarded the Novel Contemporary Readers Award at the end of the year. The word " work-in-progress " became a buzzword, and was made into a serial drama on the Asahi Broadcasting Corporation as " special-fire work-in-progress ." In the following year, 1973, "Kihei Crime Book" was published in the "All Readings" January–December issue, "Swordsman Commerce" was published in the "Shincho Shincho" January–December issue, and "Workman" was published in "Novel". Hyundai] serialized in parallel in February, July, September and October. On the other hand, "Kumokiri Nizaemon" ("Weekly Shincho" August 26, 1972, issue - April 4, 1974, issue), "top and bottom of the sword" ("Tokyo Times" In addition to 73 years May 15,- 1974 March 30) and novels such as, essay "scene of the meal" ("Weekly Asahi" 1972 January 7 issue - 73 years July 27 issue) has also been writing like. In 1973, the five volumes of "Shintaro Ikenami Self-selected Masterpieces" were published by Rippu Shobo. Although the instigator, "Haruyuki Kiseki Needle" was once again awarded the Novel Modern Readers Award, and "Swordsman Commerce" became a TV drama in April.

1974 (1974), " Weekly Asahi " magazine of " Tahei Sanada Symbol " (January 4 issue - 80 years December 15 issue) is added, this addition to "man-vibration" in the same year ("Sun" The July–September issue of 77) was also written, and in February "Deathkiller" was filmized, and in November "Akaze Mikuni Toge" was staged in a new play. In 1975 (Showa 50), only four novels were announced: Onihira, Swordsman, Umeyasu, and Sanada, but won the Novel Modern Readers Award three times for "Umeyasu Saimoku Umbrella". In playwrights, in addition to Shinkoku-drama, Kabuki has also been screenplayed, including both the original and screenplay, "Debachi Uchidama" (February Kabukiza), "Kenkaku Business" (June Imperial Theater)), "killer-process people" (September Meiji seat involved in the stage of five) "Heihachi of Tegoshi" (November Meiji seat), the next 1976 years in addition, the "black cloud Pass" in the (April), "Edo woman drafts and implements・ Debuting Uchidama (October), Mayor, and Kyobana Tachibana Chobei (October). Of these, he was also in charge of directing "Kuroun Pass" and "Edo Woman Zoshi" .

=== Along with the three major series ===
In a series of performances, he worked with Matagoro Nakamura on 1975's "Debachi Uchidama" and "Swordsman Commerce", and deepened friendship, but from 1976 (Showa 51) "Matagoro's Spring Autumn" (" Chuokoron "July issue-June 77 issue). The same year to the other "become want to eat something when the walk" ("Sun" January - 77 June issue), "secret view of man" ("Shukan Shincho" January - 1977 May 12) and three major series. 1977 (1977) and more new series "Shinobi of the flag" ("Yomiuri Shimbun" evening edition November 26 – 78 years 22 August) began. In the same year, he received the 11th Eiji Yoshikawa Literary Prize for his writer's activities centered on "Onihei Criminal Account Book", "Swordsman Commerce", and "Masaru Fujieda Umeyasu" . " Ichimatsu Konojo Onna " (February) and "Sanada Taihei" (November) were staged and performed on the NHK "Let's Talk with This Person " and played the song "Picolino" in the movie " Top Hat ". Was requested. In the early summer of that year, he traveled to France and other European countries for the first time .

1978 (1978), "Onihei", "swordsman" other, "Journey" ("Sankei newspaper" May 13 – 79 years May 7 days) while starting a series of, "Woman of Aibiki" (February Kabukiza), script and direction for "Kisui" (November Meijiza). In addition, the "Ichimatsu Kozo Onna" received high praise in the previous year and received the 3rd Otani Takejiro Prize. In July, "Kumogiri Nizaemon" was made into a movie. In this year, a total of 10 volumes and another volume of "Ikenami Shotaro Short Stories Complete Works" were published by Rippu Shobo. The next 1979 years devoted to the writing of the three major series in (1979), the addition of the series from the previous, "Sunday fountain pen" (" Mainichi Shimbun " February 4 – 80 years 27 January), Only two essays of "A Night with a Good Smell" ("Journal of the Sun" July–May 1981) were released. In the fall of this year, he traveled to Europe again. 1980 (1980), this year also, "Onihei", "swordsman" in addition to "Haiku of taste" (" Art Shincho " January - December) was serialized. The same year, Taihei Sanada was completed. By 1982, everything was in book form. In early summer, he travels Europe three times. 1981 (Showa 56), "black and white" ("Weekly Shincho" April 23 issue- November 4, 1982)Issue). Furthermore, in addition to the serialization of the essay "Old Man's Taste" ("Novel Shincho", January–December 1982), he wrote "Man's Etiquette" (Goma Shobo) and "Den-no-Kaze" (Kodansha). . Around this time, a number of essays based on traveling in Europe were also published. In 1982, the novel "Don Remi no Rain" (September issue of Novel Shincho) was set in France. In the same year, Shinsho 45+ featured a series of "Shincho 45+ Horigirikan" (May–April 1983). In early summer, he traveled to Europe four times. In 1983 (1983), in addition to Onihira, Swordsman and Umeyasu, "Kunagare Yuku" ("Weekly Bunshun" January 6- August 18/25 merged), "Tweet of the dining table" ("Weekly Asahi" October 14- July 20, 1984) was released.

=== Later years ===
1984 The (1984) "Onihei" other "breast" of "swordsman" ("Shukan Bunshun" January 5 - Issue July 26 new series the issue). In the fall, he makes his fifth European trip. The next 1985 years (1985) to the "satisfaction satisfaction" ("Shukan Shincho" May 30 issue - November 28 issue) and the "secret of voice" ("Sankei Shimbun" August 19 – 86 years 4 30) was announced. He also published a small book entitled "Shintaro Ikenami's Palette Play" from Kadokawa Shoten . In the same year, received the Medal with Purple Ribbon. "Kihei" "Swordsman" "Umeyasu" serialized in parallel. In addition, the "secret" ("Shukan Bunshun" February 6 issue - September 11 issue) writes, "all night was dramatized on the basis of the original of the" black cloud Pass, "said Shin Hasegawa of homebrew in Shinkokugeki performances of March Participation in the production of "Kenken" The Shinkoku drama was disbanded the following year, and it was the last time the troupe of Yukari Ikenami performed in his script. In 1987 (Showa 62), he squeezed the three major series into a single "swordsman" and serialized "harappa" in the "wave" (January–February 1988 issue). In January of the same year, "Shintaro Ikenami Exhibition" was held at Seibu Department Store Ikebukuro Main Store . 1988, This year is "Edo Off pictorial walk" ("novel Shincho" January - December issue) as a cohesive work (with the exception of the series from the previous) kept only in, France in May, in September Germany, I traveled to France and Italy, and this was my last overseas trip. In December of this year, he received the 36th Kikuchi Hiroshi Prize for "creating a new hero that is the essence of popular literature, lively photographing the way men live today in novels, and gaining overwhelming support from readers ."

On January 7, 1989 (Showa 64), the Emperor Showa broke down and changed to Heisei . Although he was not in good shape from the end of the previous year, he waited for recovery, but "Kenka Business Ups and Downs" ("Weekly Shincho" February–July), "Worker: Umeyasu Fujieda Umeyasu Winter Seasonal Rain" ("Novel Contemporary") December issue-), "Onihei Criminal Book Kidnapping" ("Details of All Reading" December issue-) has started serialization. In May, a solo exhibition "Shintaro Ikenami Paintbrush Fun Exhibition" was held at Ginza Wako . In 1990 (Heisei 2), the TV drama "Kihei Crime Book" starring Yoshiemon Nakamura, the second generation, gained a good reputation.In February, "Kituki" starring Yoshiemon will be staged at Kabukiza Theater . Shotaro's condition was still poor. March, acute leukemia at Mitsui Memorial Hospital emergency hospitalization in, died at the same hospital on May 3, 67-year-old . The serializers "Worker, Fujieda Umeyasu Umeyasu Winter Seasonal Rain" and "Onihei Crime Book Kidnapping" were unfinished in the April issue of the same year. A funeral and a farewell ceremony were held on May 6 at the Senaya Hall . Hitomi Yamaguchi's eulogy was read. The legal name is "Hanabunin Shashosho". He was buried at Asakusa Shikoji (Shinshu Otani school). After his death, he was awarded the Order of the Third Order of the Ruins.

In November 1998 (Heisei 10), " Shintaro Ikenami Sanada Taiheikikan " was opened in Ueda City, Nagano Prefecture .

== English translation ==
- Master Assassin Baian series
  1. Master Assassin: Tales of Murder from Shogun City aka Ninja Justice: Six Tales of Murder and Revenge (Koroshi no Yonin: Shikakenin Fujieda Baian)
  2. Bridge of Darkness: The Return of the Master Assassin (Baian Ari Jigoku: Shikakenin Fujieda Baian)

== Bibliography ==
=== Fiction ===
Ikenami created several works, including:

- Kenkaku Shōbai
- Onihei Hankachō
- Amigasa Jūbei
- Kumokiri Nizaemon
- Sanada Taiheiki
- Shikakenin Fujieda Baian
- The Last Journey of the Bokuden

=== Essays ===
- Ikenami, Shōtarō (1976). Otoko no Rizumu [A man's rhythm]. Kadokawa Shoten.
- Ikenami, Shōtarō. Shokutaku no Tsubuyaki.
- Ikenami, Shōtarō (1972). Shinsengumi Ibun [Strange Tales of the Shinsengumi].

== Adaptation ==
=== Television ===
- Hissatsu Shikakenin (1972)
- Amigasa Jūbei (1974)
- Onihei Hankachō (1975)
- Sanada Taiheiki (1985)
- Onihei Hankachō (1989–2016)
- Kumokiri Nizaemon (1995)
- Gokenin Zankurō (1997–2001)

=== Film ===
- Taking The Castle (1965)
- The Last Samurai (1974)
- Bandits vs. Samurai Squadron (1978)
- Hunter in the Dark (1979)
- Shikake-nin Baian (1981)
- The Assassin: Baian M.D, (2023 film)
