= Nakamura Kichiemon =

Nakamura Kichiemon (中村吉右衛門) refers to either of two Japanese actors:

- Nakamura Kichiemon I (born 1886–1954)
- Nakamura Kichiemon II (born 1944), the grandson and adopted son of Nakamura Kichiemon I
