= Nude Actress Murder Case: Five Criminals =

- Film poster
- Directed by: Teruo Ishii
- Written by: Isamu Nakada; Akira Miwa
- Starring: Ken Utsui; Yōko Mihara; Utako Mitsuya; Reiko Kita; Shigeru Amachi
- Cinematography: Hiroshi Suzuki
- Music by: Raymond Hattori
- Distributed by: Shintoho
- Release date: November 10, 1957 (Japan)
- Running time: 74 minutes
- Country: Japan
- Language: Japanese

Nude Actress Murder Case: Five Criminals (Japanese: 肉体女優殺し 五人の犯罪者, Hepburn: Nikutai joyū koroshi: Go-nin no hanzaisha) is a 1957 Japanese black and white film directed by Teruo Ishii at Shintoho during the time he was filming the Super Giant series.

== Cast ==
- Ken Utsui: Kōji Nishimura
- Yōko Mihara: Betty Momozono
- Utako Mitsuya: 水町かほる
- Reiko Kita: 浜野千鳥
- Shigeru Amachi: 天野
- Teruo Wakatsuki: 若林
- Mitsuhiko Ōe: 徳島
- Shigeru Ogura: ハチノキ
- Shinsuke Mikimoto: 森元
- Kōtarō Sugiyama: 野村
- Shōzaburo Tachi: 黒井
- Yutaka Maki: 港湾事務所員
- Kyōko Yashiro: 荒川運輸女事務員
- Junko Arita: 悦子 (Stripper)
- Masami Akimoto: Masami (Stripper)
- Masako Yoshida: Champu (Stripper)
- Kayo Negishi: 明美 (Stripper)
- Kyōko Mishima: 簡易旅館天口の女将
- Masaru Kodaka: ホルモン焼の男
