= Soldiers' Girls =

Soldiers' Girls 女の防波堤 Onna no bōhatei
- Directed by: Haku Komori
- Produced by: Shintoho
- Cinematography: Yoshito Okado
- Music by: Masao Koga
- Distributed by: Shintoho
- Release date: January 4, 1958
- Running time: 88 minutes
- Country: Japan
- Language: Japanese

Soldiers' Girls (女の防波堤, Onna no bōhatei) is a 1958 black-and-white Japanese film directed by Haku Komori and produced by Shintoho. It is a drama dealing with prostitution.

== Plot ==
Struggling in post World War II Japan, Fumiko and Yuko try to avoid getting caught up with prostitution but end up involved with the Recreation and Amusement Association (RAA).

== Cast ==
- Kinuko Obata as Fumiko Taguchi, a young prostitute
- Satsuki Arakawa as Yoshiko "Yuko" Fujii
- Akemi Tsukushi as Kiyoko Shimada
- Toshio Hosokawa (actor) (細川俊夫) as Hayashi, the Japanese boyfriend
- James P. Hughes as American Second Lieutenant Brown
- Yōko Mihara as Yuri, the experienced prostitute

== See also ==
- Soldier Girls, 1981 documentary film
- Soldier's Girl, 2003 film
