= Onihei Hankachō (1989 TV series) =

- Also known as: 鬼平犯科帳
- Genre: Jidaigeki
- Directed by: Masahiro Takase; Yoshiki Onoda
- Starring: Kichiemon Nakamura; Meiko Kaji; Keizō Kanie; Yumi Takigawa; Teruyuki Kagawa
- Theme music composer: Toshiaki Tsushima
- Country of origin: Japan
- Original language: Japanese

Production
- Producers: Hisao Ichikawa; Youichi Nomura
- Running time: 45 minutes (per episode)
- Production companies: Fuji Television; Shochiku

Original release
- Network: FNS (Fuji TV)
- Release: 1989 – 2016

Onihei Hankachō (鬼平犯科帳) is a Japanese television jidaigeki or period drama that was broadcast from 1989 to 2016. It is based on Shōtarō Ikenami's novel of the same title. Kichiemon Nakamura plays Heizō Hasegawa. Kichiemon Nakamura`s father Matsumoto Kōshirō VIII also played same role in 1969. In 1995 the drama made into a movie.(Onihei's Detective Records directed by Yoshiki Onoda.)

== Plot ==
Hasegawa is a chief of Hitsuke Tōzoku Aratamegata. He is a talented man and feared like an oni by thieves. On the other hand, he is a man with big heart, and some former thieves impressed by his personality are now working for him. Hasegawa and his subordinates help each other to arrest thieves.

== Characters ==
- Kichiemon Nakamura as Heizō Hasegawa
- Meiko Kaji as Omasa
- Keizō Kanie as Kumehachi
- Yumi Takigawa as Hisae
- Toshinori Omi as Kimura Chūgo(Usagi)
- Etsushi Takahashi as Sashima Tadasuke
- Kōichi Miura as Isaji
- Saburō Shinoda (Season 1)/Toshio Shiba (Season 2)/Hiroshi Katsuno (from Season 3) as Sakai Yūsuke
- Teruyuki Kagawa (Season1-2) as Koyanagi
- Edoya Nekohachi as Sagami no Hikojyū
- Baku Numata as Muramatsu(Neko Dono)

== Seasons ==
- Season1 26episodes
- Season2 18 episodes
- Season3 19 episodes
- Season4 19 episodes
- Season5 13 episodes
- Season6 11 episodes
- Season7 16 episodes

== TV Specials ==
- Kyoken, guest starring Hisashi Igawa (1989)
- Ryusei, guest starring Hiroshi Inuzuka (1990)
- Tonosama Eigoro, guest starring Ichirō Nakatani, Hiroyuki Nagato (1990)
- Unryūken, guest starring Shigeru Tsuyuguchi, Yū Fujiki (1990)
- Atami miyage no Takaramono, guest starring Chosuke Ikariya (1991)
- Futari Gorozo, guest starring Kantarō Suga, Ittoku Kishibe (1993)
- Hebiichigo no Onna, guest starring Akira Nakao (1995)
- Meiro, guest starring Raita Ryu, Renji Ishibashi (1995)
- Onibi (1998)
- Saraba Onihei Hankachō (1998)
- Ohkawa no Inkyo, guest starring Hideji Ōtaki (2001)
- Yamabukiya Okatsu, guest starring Isao Hashizume, Sei Hiraizumi (2005)
- Kyōzoku, guest starring Nenji Kobayashi, Ren Osugi, Shigeru Kōyama (2006)
- Ippon Mayu, guest starring Kenichi Endō, Shōhei Hino, Ken Utsui (2007)
- Hikikomi Onna, guest starring Kimiko Yo, Matsumoto Kōshirō X (2008)
- Amabiki no Bungorō, guest starring Jun Kunimura, Shirō Itō
- Takahagi no Sutegorō, guest starring Shōhei Hino, Masahiko Tsugawa (2010)
- Issun no Mushi, guest starring Rentarō Mikuni, Yasufumi Terawaki (2011)
- Tōzoku Konrei, guest starring Ken Matsudaira (2011)
- Dojyou no Wasuke Shimatsu, guest starring Renji Ishibashi, Atsuo Nakamura, Miki Sakai, Susumu Terajima (2013)
- Mihari no Ito, guest starring Katsuo Nakamura (2013)
- Mikkoku, guest starring Reiko Takashima (2015)
- Onihei The Final 1 Gonenme no Kyaku (2016), starring Shōsuke Tanihara and Mayumi Wakamura
- Onihei The Final 2 Unryūken (2016), starring Isao Hashizume and Sei Hiraizumi

== Film ==
- Onihei's Detective Records (1995 105 minutes) directed by Yoshiki Onoda, screen play by Tatsuo Nogami. Etsushi Takahashi made his final film appearance in the film.

=== Guest starring ===
- Shima Iwashita as Otoyo
- Makoto Fujita as Shirako no Kikuemon
- Renji Ishibashi as Oki Genzō
- Masanori Sera as Yougorō
- Kenichi Endō as Bunkichi
- Tōru Minegishi as Hebi no Heijyou
- Hirotarō Honda as Keichigoro

== See also ==
- Onihei Hankachō
- Onihei Hankachō(1975 TV)
