= Onihei Hankachō =

Series of novels by Ikenami Shotaro

- Author: Shōtarō Ikenami
- Country: Japan
- Language: Japanese
- Genre: Historical fiction
- Publisher: Bungeishunjū
- Published: 1967–1989
- Media type: Print (hardback & paperback)
- No. of books: 20

Onihei Hankachō (鬼平犯科帳) is a series of historical novels written by Japanese author Shōtarō Ikenami. Following the character Heizo Hasegawa in the Edo period of Japan, Ikenami wrote the first story for the December 1967 issue of the light novel magazine Ōru Yomimono published by Bungeishunjū. It was well-received and began serialization in January 1968. Ikenami wrote 19 books in the main series before he died in 1990. As of 2021, the series had 30 million copies in circulation.

Onihei Hankachō was also adapted into TV programs, a manga series, live-action films and theater productions. An anime television adaption aired in 2017.

== Story ==
The title character is Heizo Hasegawa, a historical person who was a Hitsuke Tōzoku Aratamekata Chōkan (Superintendent General of the investigation agency specialized in theft and armed robbery and arson (in Japanese)). He started as a chartered libertine before succeeding his father as his heir and being appointed the head of the special police which had jurisdiction over arson-robberies in Edo. Since there was no child between his father and the legitimate wife, he was brought to the Hasegawa family at the age of 17. Heizo was looked down upon by his stepmother, who said that he was a child by a concubine. He rebelled against her and ran away from the house. He became the head of "the hoodlums" and led a fast life. His street name was "Honjo no Tetsu" which comes from his childhood name "Tetsusaburō". When his father died, he inherited his birthright and a villain eventually nicknamed him "Onihei," meaning "Heizō the demon". He led a band of samurai police and cultivated reformed criminals as informants to solve difficult crimes. Later, he was titled "Hitsuke tōzoku aratamekata" (police force for arson and theft), and opened an office at his official residence. While he was called "demon" and was feared, he was forgiving and merciful to those who committed a crime out of necessity or were faithful even if they were criminals. He dedicated himself to establish and maintain the Ishikawajima Ninsoku Yoseba, a vocational training school for criminals, and served concurrently as a Yoseba magistrate for a while.

Four actors, Matsumoto Hakuō I, (Note: It was during the era before Matsumoto Kōshirō VIII succeeded to Matsumoto Hakuō I, and he played in "Onihei Hankachō '69" between October 7, 1969 and December 29, 1970. For the term of October 7, 1971 to March 30, 1972, "Onihei Hankachō '71" was aired. Both series was given the year in title to make a distinction against his son Kichiemon II's series.) Tamba Tetsurō (Note: Tamba Tetsurō played in "Onihei Hankachō '75" between April 2, 1975 and September 24, 1975 on NET television.) and Nakamura Kinnosuke (Note: Nakamura Kinnosuke played in "Onihei Hankachō '80", "Onihei Hankachō '81" and "Onihei Hankachō '82" between April 1980 and October 1982 on TV Asahi.) also played the lead in Toho series on NET. More recently, Nakamura Kichiemon II, the younger son of Hakuō I, led a cast in Shochiku production on Fuji Television over 25 years, reputed as the best actor to portray Onihei which has been the highlight of his career aside from plays as a Kabuki actor. (Note: Onihei TV series was broadcast at 19:00-19:55 each Monday. Nakamura Kichiemon II finished shooting A Vanished Man (消えた男) before this interview.)

The Fuji series ran from 1989 to 2001, with occasional short series and specials as recently as 2007. Until his death in 2001, Edoya Nekohachi III portrayed the informant Hikojū, often paired with Omasa (Meiko Kaji). Another informant was played by Chōsuke Ikariya. Yumi Takigawa was Hisae, wife of Onihei. Guests have included Akira Emoto, Frankie Sakai, Rokusaburo Michiba, Makoto Fujita, Shima Iwashita, Isuzu Yamada, Yoshizumi Ishihara, and Tetsuro Tamba. The series has been handed to Fuji on the broadcast satellite network (BS Fuji), after the show ended for Fuji on the terrestrial network.

== Episodes ==
In all, 137 stories were published and made into TV programs, mainly by Fuji Television and NET Television (succeeded by Asahi Television). In addition, there are 11 special programs per year since 2005 combining several of those stories into a single episode, on consent by Ikenami himself. BS Fuji reruns serials with additional episodes. For Pay TV on a satellite television, SKY PerfecTV! Premium Service and Jidaigeki Senmon Channel co-produced four extra editions called "Onihei Gaiden". The producers shot the extra edition on film, as they knew Ikenami loved films and called himself a Cinemadict (addicted to cinema/film). (Note: Ikenami frequented film theater since he was young so that he felt hungry without seeing one for three days, and even during the most busy days as a novelist, he enjoyed 15 titles per month. French films of the 1950s which were called "film noir" was his favorite. It could be said that Ikenami was influenced by the drama framework of his favorite director, Julien Duvivier the master craftsman of finesse, and those main characters in his novels could be related to the actor Jean Gabin portrayed as a cool guy in French films of the 1950s. (Referred to "Kaisōno Jan Gaban" – Furansu Eigano Tabi", published by Heibonsha. In the Prologue, "Rōtō Ruten" official site).)

Broadcast programs on satellite are: "Yousagi no Kakuemon" (2011), (Note: Script based on "Shiranami Kanban".) "Kumagorō no Kao" (2011/2012), (Note: Script based on Kumagorō no Kao in anthology "Nippon Kaitōden" published as paperback from Kadokawa. Aired in 2011 on SKY PerfecTV! and in 2012 on Jidaigeki Senmon Channel.) "Shōgatsu Yokkano Kyaku" (2012/2013), (Note: Script based on episodes for Sanada Soba eatery. Received the Best TV program for November at the Galaxy Award (Japan) 2012 as well as the Best Original Program (Drama) at the 3rd Original Program Award presented by the Satellite Television Union.) and "Rōtō Ruten" (2013). (Note: Script based on "Koroshi" in short stories "Edono Ankokugai".) A DVD is released for each episode.

Ikenami left a will that the scripts would be true to his Onihei novels, and that he prohibited any episode written by a scriptwriter on his/her own storyline so that when all original Onihei stories were made into scripts, the serial should be ended. The final Onihei episodes is planned as two Onihei Hankachō Specials, with episode #149 "Asakusa Mikuriyagashi" (December 18, 2015) (Note: As the last from the final episode is announced, Fuji Television interviewed Nakamura Kichiemon II who played Onihei for 26 years. Kichiemon II shares his relationship to Ikegami Shōtarō on the 25th year after his death, and notes they met for the first time when Kichiemon II played Tatsuzō, the son of Hasegawa Heizō aka Onihei whom his father (Matsumoto Koshiro VIII) portrayed. When Kichiemon II turned 40 years old, they offered him to play the part of Onihei, though he felt he was too young and not ready to overwrite his father's Heizo. Ikegami waited for 5 years, and when Kichiemon was 45 years old, he persuaded Kichiemon II to play Onihei as 45 years old when Onihei was appointed the head of "Hitsuke tōzoku aratamekata" (police force for arson and theft).) and the final #150 shot in the summer of 2016 for broadcast in two segments in 2016-'17.

== Adaptations ==
=== Television ===
Title	Year	Starring
Onihei Hankachō	1969–1972	Matsumoto Kōshirō VIII
Onihei Hankachō	1975	Tetsuro Tamba
Onihei Hankachō	1980–1982	Yorozuya Kinnosuke
Onihei Hankachō	1989–2016	Nakamura Kichiemon II
Onihei Hankachō	2024	Matsumoto Kōshirō X

=== Films ===
"Onihei Hankachō" was released on November 18, 1995, as a film to commemorate the 100th year since Shōchiku was established. DVD was produced later.

Title	Year	Starring
Onihei Hankachō	1995	Nakamura Kichiemon II
Onihei Hankachō	2024	Matsumoto Kōshirō X

=== Theaters ===
Heizō was played by Matsumoto Kōshirō VIII (1970–1971), Takahashi Hideki (1978), and Nakamura Kichiemon II has personalized Heizō since the production of 1990. As the company belongs to Shōchiku aside from the 1978 production, most stages are brought on Meiji-za, where Kabuki is performed in Tokyo. Productions were brought to Minami-za in Kyoto as well as Misono-za in Nagoya, the theaters known to stage Kabuki plays as well.

- "Onihei Hankachō", September 1970 at Teikoku gekijō. Matsumoto Kōshirō VIII as Heizō. As part of the 17 memorial for late Nakamura Kichiemon I. Script combined "Sakura Mansion at Honjo (本所・桜屋敷)", "Onna suri Otomi (女すりお富)", and "Oyuki's Breasts (お雪の乳房)".
- "Fox Fire (狐火)", April 1971 at Meiji-za. Matsumoto Kōshirō VIII as Heizō.
- "Onihei Hankachō – Foxfire (鬼平犯科帳狐火)", November 1978 at Meiji-za. Takahashi Hideki as Heizō.
- "Fox Fire", February 1990 at Kabukiza. Nakamura Kichiemon II as Heizō. A repeat performance of the 1971 production.
- "Sakura Mansion at Honjo (本所・桜屋敷)", February 1991 at Shinbashi Enbujō. Nakamura Kichiemon II as Heizō.
- "A Guest in the Fifth Year (五年目の客)", February 1992 at Shinbashi Enbujō. Nakamura Kichiemon II as Heizō. Script combined the title work and "Yamabukino Okatsu (山吹のお勝)".
- "The Woman of the Past (むかしの女)", February 1993 at Shinbashi Enbujō. Nakamura Kichiemon II as Heizō. Guest stars Nakamura Matagorō (Minobino Kinosuke) and Nakamura Tomijūrō V (Kishii Samanosuke). Script combined the title work and "Dream of an Old Thief (老盗の夢)".
- "The Woman of the Past", June 1994 at Kyoto Minami-za. A repeat performance of the 1993 production.
- "Color of Fire (炎の色), February 1994 at Shinbashi enbujō. Nakamura Kichiemon II as Heizō. Script combined the title work and "A Mistress' Child (隠し子)".
- "Duel of Blood (血闘)", March 1995 at Shinbashi enbujō. Nakamura Kichiemon II as Heizō. Guest star Ichikawa Sadanji IV (Gorozō). Script combined "Osato of Koigimo (鯉肝のお里)", "A Man of the Past (むかしの男)", and "Duel of Blood (血闘)".
- "Duel of Blood", June 1995 at Kyoto Minami-za. A repeat performance of the 1995 production.
- "Retired Man at Ōkawa (大川の隠居)", May 2007 at Shinbashi Enbujō. Nakamura Kichiemon II as Heizō. Guest star Nakamura Karoku (Sendō Tomogorō).
- "Retired Man at Ōkawa" April 2008 at Misonoza in Nagoya. A repeat performance of the 2007 production.
- "Fox Fire", May 2009 at Shinbashi Enbujō. A repeat performance of the 1971 production.
- "Retired Man at Ōkawa", June 2010 at Hakataza in Hakata. A repeat performance of the 2007 production.

=== Manga ===
- Onihei Hankachō

コミック 鬼平犯科帳
- Genre: Drama, Historical, Mystery
- Manga
- Written by: Sentaro Kubota
- Illustrated by: Takao Saito
- Published by: Leed, Bungeishunjū
- English publisher: JManga
- Magazine: Comic Ran
- Original run: 1993 – present
- Volumes: 126
- icon

Onihei Hankachō (コミック 鬼平犯科帳) is a manga adaptation of Ikenami's novels, originally written by Sentaro Kubota and illustrated by Takao Saito. It has been published in Leed Publishing's Comic Ran magazine since 1993, with the collected volumes published by both Leed and Bungeishunjū. The story is true to Ikegami's original, with the exceptions of "Wedding of a Thief (『盗賊婚礼』)", and the later works which combine Onihei stories with other titles by Ikegami. The story of "Executer Maru (仕置きの○)" is counted as part of the series.

The arranger was changed to Hisazumi Ohara since the May 2008 issue upon the death of Kubota. In 2012, JManga licensed the series for digital English release under the title Onihei, the Devilish Bureau Chief. By August 2019, the manga had 6.5 million copies in print. The manga was serialized continuously for 25 years until a mistake by the editorial department resulted in the September 2019 issue of Comic Ran becoming the first not to include a chapter. Saito died in September 2021, but Leed Publishing announced that Onihei Hankachō will continue without him per his wishes.

=== Arcade games ===
Sengoku Taisen (戦国大戦 -1615 大坂燃ゆ、世は夢の如く-) version 3.1 by Sega Interactive collaborates Onihei story where there is a deck of Heizō is modeled after Hasegawa Masanaga, who was the elder brother of Heizō's ancestor Hasegawa Nobutsugu.

=== DVD ===
Onoda Yoshiki, director (2004). Onihei Hankachō – the Film (『鬼平犯科帳 劇場版』) (DVD). Shōchiku. (in Japanese)

From Onihei Hankachō – Special series; Ishihara Shigeru, director (2006). Yamabukiya Okatsu (鬼平犯科帳 スペシャル – 『山吹屋お勝』) (DVD). Shōchiku. (in Japanese)

Inoue Akira, director (2007). the Villain (鬼平犯科帳 スペシャル – 『兇賊』) (DVD). Shōchiku Home Video. (in Japanese)

Inoue Akira, director (2008). Monobrow (鬼平犯科帳スペシャル – 『一本眉』) (DVD). Shōchiku Home Video. (in Japanese)

Ishihara Shigeru, director (2012). "Wedding of a Thief (鬼平犯科帳スペシャル – 『盗賊婚礼』) (DVD). Shōchiku. (in Japanese)

=== Anime ===
- Onihei
- Anime television series
- Directed by: Shigeyuki Miya
- Produced by: Ayaka Sugiura; Ryōta Hasegawa; Shiori Kusumi; Naoshi Sawa
- Written by: Mika Abe (1, 12, OVA); Shigeru Murakoshi (2); Tatsurō Inamoto (3–4, 6–7, 10, 13); Seishi Minakami (5, 9); Ayako Katō (8)
- Music by: Kohei Tanaka; Ryū Kawamura
- Studio: Studio M2 (TV); MAPPA (OVA); TMS Entertainment (production)
- Licensed by: NA: Tubi; (expired)
- Original network: TV Tokyo, TVA, TVh, TVQ Kyushu, TSC, TVO, Jidaigeki Speciality Channel
- Original run: January 10, 2017 – April 4, 2017
- Episodes: 13 + OVA

An anime television series adaptation by Studio M2 aired from January 10, 2017, to April 4, 2017. The anime is directed by Shigeyuki Miya who also designs the characters. Masao Maruyama is credited as creative producer with TMS Entertainment in production. An OVA prequel was released on February 22, 2017. The theme song for this anime is Soshite....Ikinasai by Saori Yuki. Amazon Prime later added the anime series on the same day of the Japanese broadcast of premiere episode. An English dub of the anime was released on Tubi on April 15, 2021.

==== Characters ====
Heizō Hasegawa (長谷川平蔵, Hasegawa Heizō) Voiced by: Kenyu Horiuchi (Japanese); Jason Kesser (English)
The main character and head of the Arson Thief Control Office (ATC), who is shrewd, fair, and an expert swordsman, He is in charge of investigating and resolving arson and robbery cases throughout Edo.
Tatsuzō (辰蔵, Tatsuzō) Voiced by: Daisuke Namikawa (Japanese); Alex Machado (English)
Son of Heizō and Hisae Hasegawa.
Hisae (久栄, Hisae) Voiced by: Junko Iwao (Japanese); Elaine Flores (English)
Wife of Heizō Hasegawa.
Ojun (お順, Ojun) Voiced by: Sayaka Senbongi (Japanese); Olivia Cruz (English)
Young adopted daughter of Heizō and Hisae Hasegawa who was the daughter of a thief Heizo apprehended.
Omasa (おまさ, Omasa) Voiced by: Romi Park
A former thief who became a spy working under Heizō's information network after he rescued her from her former accomplices.
Chūgo Kimura (木村忠吾, Kimura Chūgo) Voiced by: Nobuhiko Okamoto (Japanese); Scott Genn (English)
One of the samurai dōshins under the ATC who uses a katana when on duty.
Chūsuke Sajima (佐嶋忠介, Sajima Chūsuke) Voiced by: Kiyomitsu Mizuuchi (Japanese); Chris Jahn (English)
One of the samurai dōshins under the ATC who uses a katana when on duty.
Yūsuke Sakai (酒井祐助, Sakai Yūsuke) Voiced by: Kenji Hamada (Japanese); Carlos Alayeto (English)
Senior officer and samurai in the ATC, in charge of the yorikis who uses a katana when on duty.
Yasugorō Koyanagi (小柳安五郎, Koyanagi Yasugorō) Voiced by: Hidenobu Kiuchi (Japanese); Alex Teixeira (English)
One of the samurai dōshins under the ATC who uses a katana when on duty.
Hikojū (彦十, Hikojū) Voiced by: Shōzō Iizuka
An old friend of Heizō who becomes a spy working in Heizō's information network.
Kumehachi (粂八, Kumehachi) Voiced by: Yoshimasa Hosoya (Japanese); Rio Chavarro (English)
A reformed ex-thief who was captured by Heizō, now working under the ATC directly. His rank is Okappiki.
Samanosuke Kishii (岸井左馬之助, Kishii Samanosuke) Voiced by: Hideyuki Tanaka

==== Episode list ====
No.	Title	Original release date
1	"Tanbei of Chigashira" "Chigashira no Tanbee" (血頭の丹兵衛)	January 10, 2017
A thief named Kumehachi is captured and tortured by the officers of chief Heizō Hasegawa, head of the special police who has jurisdiction over arson-robberies in Edo. Kumehachi refuses to talk saying that he kept to the principles of his former boss Tanbei of Chigashira of: never kill, never steal from the poor and never rape women. When a wooden tag with the name Tanbei of Chigashira on it is left at the scene of two robberies and massacres, Kumehachi asks Hasegawa to let him capture the person posing as his former leader. Hasegawa agrees, and Kumehachi finds the location of Tanbei and his group. He leads Hasegawa and his officers to their hideout and in the ensuing fight, all except Tanbei is killed. Kumehachi confronts him about breaking his three principles, but Tanbei just laughs and says that that was in the past. Kumehachi refuses to accept it and accuses him of being an imposter and he is arrested. Hasegawa then asks if Kumehachi will spy for him. Later, Hasegawa's son Tatsuzo says that he is returning from training at the dojo, but has lipstick on his coat, and the smell of woman's face powder on him.
2	"Honjo, Sakura Estate" "Honjo, Sakura Yashiki" (本所・櫻屋敷)	January 17, 2017
A man is lured into an alley by a distressed woman, but it's a trap and he is robbed and killed. Meanwhile, Hasegawa's wife is concerned about their son neglecting his studies and training. He thinks back to his time as an arrogant youth when he trained at Ginhei Takasugi's Hall with Samanosuke Kishii. He learns that criminals have been seen at Kanunosuke Hattori's estate in Honjo and he decides to investigate. He passes his old dōjō and meets his old friend, Samanosuke Kishii, who was also a rival for the attentions of Takasugi sensei's granddaughter Ofusa. That night he meets Hiko, an old acquaintance who tell him about Hattori's criminal and extortion activities aided by his wife Ofusa. Hiko agrees to help Hasegawa and tells him of a planned robbery and slaughter at the Oumiya store. With this information, Hasegawa ambushes Kishii and kills his men. He then questions Hattori and Ofusa. Ofusa tells how 15 years ago she became part of the Oumiya family through an arranged marriage, became pregnant but miscarried. When her husband died in an accident, his younger brother took over and banished her. Approached by Hattori she saw a way to make a future for herself, and take revenge.
3	"The Evil Scent of the Hakubaiko" "Anken Hakubaikō" (暗剣白梅香)	January 24, 2017
Heizō Hasegawa is attacked by a swordsman on a bridge at night. The assassin escapes but leaves the scent of a woman's makeup. Meanwhile, the surly ronin Hanshiro has been at the Hasegawa household while searching for Mori, his father's killer of 20 years ago to avenge the death and become a samurai. The assassin wears a fragrant oil to mask the smell of blood. On a rainy night the assassin attacks again, but Kumehachi intervenes. After the fight, the assassin becomes delirious and overwhelmed by the smell of blood. He is revealed to be the ronin Hanshiro and is innocently cared for by Osaki, a servant of the household. While shopping Heizō finds the oil called Hakubaikō used by the assassin and lays a trap for him, but he escapes. When Osaki is scolded by the house managers, Hanshiro kills them both and takes her with him, planning to leave the life of a ronin behind. Kumehachi tracks them down and Heizō acts as bait. When Hanshiro attacks Heizō again, Heizō defeats him, but as Hanshiro runs, he is stabbed by Mori, the owner of the inn. Mori recognized Hanshiro and killed him to preventing him from avenging his father's death.
4	"Blood Battle" "Kettō" (血闘)	January 31, 2017
A woman named Omasa visits Heizō and tells how a few days earlier she was the inside-person for a robbery at a household, but to her horror, a young girl who saw the robbers was killed. The leader Genpachi plans another robbery in 5 days and Heizō asks her to spy for him. Heizō trusts her story as he knows her from 20 years ago when she was the young daughter of the thief Chusuke of Tazugane who ran a sake bar. When Genpachi tells Omasa the date of the next job, she and Hikojū follow him, however Omasa is captured. Hikojū leads Heizō back to Genpachi's house, but although he and his men already left, Omasa leaves a trail of her blood for Heizō and Hikojū to follow. They track the blood to his hideout and Heizō sends Hikojū for help. Rather than wait, Heizō enters himself to rescue Omasa. He takes on the group of bandits, but is heavily outnumbered and wounded in the shoulder by an arrow and then cornered. At the last moment, his Arson Thief Control men arrive and rescue him and Omasa.
5	"Yanaka, Iroha Tea House" "Yanaka Iroha Chaya" (谷中・いろは茶屋)	February 7, 2017
A client, Chugo, tells Omatsu, a prostitute at the Iroha Tea House, that he can no longer visit her. Before that scene of a massacre was found, suspected to have been carried out by Shugoro of Hakabi. Heizō wants city patrols strengthened, including Chugo Kimura, his record-keeper. Chugo meets Omatsu on patrol and spends all of his money on her, but a benefactor, master Kawagoe is now paying his account. Chugo is found out and reprimanded for dereliction of his duty. Meanwhile, Kawagoe, who is actually Shugoro of Hakabi, is planning his last job in Edo. While on a nighttime visit to Omatsu, Chugo sees some suspicious characters, and sends word back to Heizō. Heizō and the Arson Thief Control arrive and attack the men in the hideout, leaving Chugo to guard the exit. Kawagoe is wounded and escapes, aiming for Chugo, but is too badly wounded and dies. Heizō rewards Chugo who confesses that he was not on patrol, but Heizō forgives him. When Chugo goes to see Omatsu, the brothel owner recognizes him as the son of a former client, his father, whom he thought always lived honestly.
6	"Secret Theft Tactics" "Tōhō Hiden" (盗法秘伝)	February 14, 2017
Chugo accompanies Heizō to visit his father's grave outside Edo but Heizō but wants some time alone. While walking, Heizō saves a young couple from a group of bandits. The local magistrate Jinzo Numata, arrives and takes the young couple into custody, servants who robbed the sake brewery owner Ichigoro Masuya. Then a talkative old man, Zenpachi, follows Heizō, telling him that Ichigoro is a mean and cruel man who mistreats his servants. Hiding his identity, Heizō says he is a ronin and Zenpachi asks him to join him in a robbery of Ichigoro Masuya. Heizō agrees and on the appointed night, Zenpachi breaks into the money storeroom and they steal a box of ryo. Zenpachi also suggests they free the two young servants which pleases Heizō. They all manage to escape with the assistance of the other servants. Later Zenpachi, who has recurring stomach pains, offers Heizō his book of secret thief tactics, built up over years of robberies. Just then, magistrate Jinzo Numata enters and accuses them of the robbery, but Chugo tells the officials who Heizō is, much to Zenpachi's surprise and horror. Later Zenpachi offers to be taken into custody, but Heizō dismisses him, warning him to stay clear of Edo.
7	"Clay Pot Smashing Boy" "Kamewarikozō" (瓶割り小僧)	February 21, 2017
20 years ago in Kamiya, a young bully, Otomatsu, outwits and embarrasses a pottery shop-owner. In the present the thief Gohei Ishikawa is captured by a tip-off, but claims he is innocent. Heizō suspects that he is involved in a bigger crime with Shinbei and the Viper's clan and wants more information. Heizō recognizes him as Otomatsu, the boy he defended from a cruel and brutal stepfather years earlier. But Otomatsu is very bitter, his stepfather continued his beatings and Otomatsu eventually killed him, but was then abandoned by his mother. In revenge, Otomatsu tells Heizō's adopted daughter Ojun that she's the daughter of a thief, and she runs away from home, but Heizō finds and rescues her from the river. At Otomatsu's trial the next day, Heizō does not blame him but apologizes for not protecting him. In return Otomatsu reveals Shinbei's plans, enabling Heizō and his Arson Thief Control men to capture them. Much to Heizō's sadness, Otomatsu chooses to be executed, and they embrace before the sentence is carried out. Days later Ojun's playfulness finally lightens Heizō's somber mood.
8	"Inkyo of Okawa River" "Ōkawa no Inkyo" (大川の隠居)	February 28, 2017
Heizō is bedridden with a bad cold, but when he recovers, his father's tobacco pipe is missing. After a thorough search, he suspects a thief may have entered his house. He goes out that night with Tetsu to the Kagaya boathouse on Okawa River. They take a boat along the river and stop to see fireworks. While smoking, Heizō recognizes his father's pipe in the boatman's hands. Heizō sends Kumehachi to investigate the boatman and Kumehachi recognizes him as an old friend and former thief, now using the name Tomogoro. As they talk, Tomogoro reveals that he broke into Heizō's house and stole the pipe as an act of defiance which would make Heizō lose face. With this information, Heizō hatches a plan to catch and embarrass Tomogoro by getting him to break in again to return the pipe and steal something else. Later, Heizō hires a boat from Tomogoro again, but then reveals his own identity. The plan works and Tomogoro has a newfound respect for the chief of Arson Thief Control.
9	"Crossroads" "Wakaremichi" (わかれ道)	March 7, 2017
Heizō's son, Tatsuzo, rushes off early to training. Hisae is suspicious of his enthusiasm, but Heizō tells her about when he was also young and impetuous with an unhappy home life. Years ago when Heizō was called Tetsusaburo, and practicing at the dojo, a samurai named Jyubei Matsuoka, arrived and issued a challenge. Master Takasugi accepted on behalf of the school. After 30 minutes of extreme tension, but no action, both swordsmen lowered their swords and acknowledged each other's prowess. Impulsively Tetsusaburo challenged Matsuoka, but was disarmed by the first blow. Later, Takasugi asked Matsuoka to help teach his students, and Tetsusaburo challenged him again. Tetsusaburo lost again, but then had newfound respect for Matsuoka's skills. Some time later, Tetsusaburo was challenged by the men from a gambling establishment after revenge, but Matsuoka intervened, easily defeating them. Matsuoka then warned Tetsusaburo not to do anything to bring shame to Takasugi and the dojo. Later, Tetsusaburo accepts a well-paying job to help some thieves, but during the getaway he finds that Matsuoka is leading the thieves. Matsuoka reminds Tetsusaburo of his promise and stops him from being involved. Heizō tells Hisae that if it had not been for Matsuoka's actions, he could have followed a completely different path.
10	"The End of Wasuke of Dojo" "Dojō no Wasuke Shimatsu" (泥鰌の和助始末)	March 14, 2017
Heizō tells a bedtime story to his daughter Ojun about a "theft-workings" thief. They build in fittings while working on a client's residence that enable them to return later and rob the owner. One of them, an old skilled carpenter, Wasuke of Dojo returned to Edo but wanted to retire from the business. He finds that his son, Isotaro, adopted out to a local couple is working the Kozuya paper store. Unfortunately he is being bullied by the current owner, who frames him for attempted theft, causing him to commit suicide. Isotaro's parents and Wasuke are devastated, and his old friend Hikojū tells Heizō that Wasuke may retaliate, so Heizō has Hikojū follow him. After Isotaro's parents also take their own lives, Wasuke leads a raid on the Kozuya paper store. When Hikojū realizes what's happening, he tells Heizō who must act, however he delays rushing to the store. As the thieves escape by boat, they are watched by Heizō and the Arson Thief Control squad. Wasuke tells them to dump the gold into the river destroying evidence of the theft, meanwhile he tears up contracts that he stole from the store. This year, four years later, Kozuya went bankrupt.
11	"The Man of the Past" "Mukashi no Otoko" (むかしの男)	March 21, 2017
While Heizō is away, his wife Hisae receives a letter from Kondo Kanshiro, requesting a meeting. He was a past neighbour and lover who turned to prostitutes and crime. While she's gone, an old woman tells the household that Hisae was attacked and wounded, and in the confusion she kidnaps Ojun. The entire household and Arson Thief Control go to find Ojun and eventually locate Kondo and his men in a farmhouse. Omasa first deftly retrieves Ojun, then the Arson Thief Control squad surround the farmhouse and capture Kondo and his men. Later, Kondo tries to shame Heizō by saying that he was Hisae's first man, but Heizō just laughs, saying that he is the one who is fortunate to be with Hisae for life. During the whole operation Tatsuzo proves useless and is severely reprimanded by Heizō.
12	"The Audacious Fellow" "Akireta Yatsu" (あきれた奴)	March 28, 2017
Koyanagi of Arson Thief Control is still on duty when his wife, Omitsu is giving birth to their child. The child is stillborn, and she dies before her husband arrives home. Following the incident, Heizō is concerned that Koyanagi has become reckless, wanting to join his dead wife and child. On the anniversary of their deaths, Koyanagi stops Otaka, a woman with a baby, from jumping off a bridge. He takes her to Hikojū's inn. There, Koyanagi learns that Otaka is the wife of Matahachi, a thief he arrested and whom Otaka thought was a craftsman. Privately, Koyanagi hatches an audacious plan in which he offers Matahachi a chance to see his wife if he reveals the location of his murderous accomplice. While walking to the inn, Matahachi escapes and Koyanagi is arrested. Six months later, Matahachi returns and delivers his accomplice, clearing Koyanagi.
13	"Will-o'-the-Wisp" "Kitsunebi" (狐火)	April 4, 2017
Omasa has a dream of 10 years ago when she tried to stop Matataro, one of two sons of the Will-o'-the-Wisp gang leader, from leaving her because of the rules of his clan. Recently a violent and bloody crime in Edo follows others in Kyoto and Osaka that were associated with the Will-o'-the-Wisp gang. Heizō suspects the leader's successor, Matataro, is responsible, however Omasa finds that Matataro's younger brother Bunkichi is responsible for the crimes. Matataro reunites with Omasa and explains that Bunkichi has taken over the gang and Matataro wants to stop him. Matataro confronts Bunkichi who refuses to change, but just as they start to fight, Heizō and the Arson Thief Control squad arrive. Bunkichi escapes, chased by Matataro and Bunkichi is killed by his own knife when he tries to kill Matataro. Omasa defends Matataro, saying that he is a traveling merchant who helped her. Heizō accepts the story, but forbids him from returning to Edo. Later, Omasa is grief-stricken when Heizō tells her that he learned Matataro died from an epidemic in Kyoto.

== General and cited references ==
- Ikenami, Shōtarō (2011). Onihei Hankachō II. Kanpon Ikenami Shōtarō Taisei (in Japanese). Vol. 5 (Reprint ed.). Kōdansha.
- Nihon Eiga Eisei Kabushikigaisha; Shōchiku (2011). "Ikenami Shōtarō and Film Noir" (in Japanese). Fuji Television.
- Nihon Eiga Eisei Kabushikigaisha; Shōchiku (2012). "Ikenami Shōtarō and Film Noir" (in Japanese). Fuji Television.
- Nihon Eiga Eisei Kabushikigaisha; Shōchiku (2013). "Ikenami Shōtarō and Film Noir" (in Japanese). Fuji Television.
