= Yoshiki Onoda =

Japanese film director and writer

- Born: July 12, 1925 (age 101); Tokyo, Japan
- Occupations: Director; screenwriter
- Years active: 1958–present
- Spouse: Mitsuya Utako (m. 1960; died 2004)

Yoshiki Onoda (小野田 嘉幹, Onoda Yoshiki; born July 12, 1925) is a Japanese film director and writer.

== Biography ==
Born in Tokyo, the family then moved to Korea. In 1947, he moved back to Japan to work as an assistant director to Akira Kurosawa at the Toho studios. In 1958 he directed his first film, Hitogui Ama.

== Personal life ==
He was married to actress Mitsuya Utako from 1960 to her death in 2004.

== Filmography ==
- Hitogui Ama (1958)
- Onna Dorei-sen (also known as Female Slave Ship) (1960)
- Onna Gankutsu-ō (1960)
- Edo no Kaze (1975~1981) TV
- Tokyo Megure Keishi (1978) TV
- Edo no Uzu (1978) TV
- Edo no Gekitou (1979) TV
- Onihei Hankachō TV
- Onihei's Detective Records (1995)
- Shigosen no Yume (2001)
- Kenkaku Shōbai: Haru no Arashi (2008), TV movie
