= Yagō =

Term for a non-familial Japanese nickname

Yagō (屋号), literally meaning "house name", is a term applied in traditional Japanese culture to names passed down within a guild, studio, or other circumstance other than blood relations. The term is synonymous with iena (家名) and kadona (角名). The term most often refers to the guild names of kabuki actors, but is also applicable to the names artists take from their masters or studios, names taken from one's business, and a few other similar circumstances.

The ya (屋) of yagō, also often seen at the end of a yagō name, means "house", "roof", or "shop", and helps to illuminate the origins and meanings of the term. A number of yagō have associated mon emblems, some of which incorporate rebuses; see Japanese rebus monogram.

== History ==
Originally, yagō were place names of homes or buildings taken on by the inhabitants. Even when the house changed hands entirely from one family to another, the new family would take on the name of the house. However, the previous owners would frequently keep the house name when they moved. Often, a family (or individual) would come to be better known by their yagō than by their actual family name.

Though it is not clear when the custom first emerged, it first appears in print in the chronicles of the Muromachi period. For many centuries, commoners in Japan did not have family names, and so yagō would often come about to describe people by their location, occupation, or by a store or business they owned. There are similarities in the origins and evolution of family names in other cultures around the world.

Yagō also came to be used to help differentiate the status of lineages with the same last name, or simply to differentiate between people with the same family name within a village. Houses might come to be known simply by their location, such as in a meadow (原, Hara) or at the foot of a hill (坂本, Sakamoto), and families took on these place-names. Yagō could also be used to denote the main (honke) and branch (bunke) lines of a family.

Yagō came to be especially well-known and widely used in kabuki theater, where actors take on a name relating to their guild. The famous actor Ichikawa Danjūrō V, though he was from the Ichikawa family, was also known by the yagō of Naritaya (Narita house), which indicates his guild within the kabuki world. This therefore connects him to others of the Naritaya, and reflects his apprenticeship and study alongside certain other actors who might be from other families. Actors' yagō were often chosen to recall earlier great actors, and it remains a common practice (called kakegoe) for audience members to shout out an actor's yagō when he performed a line or pose particularly well-executed, especially a pose or line associated with the actor's namesake.

Artists, writers and poets in Japan, like in other parts of the world, would often take on pen names or pseudonyms. These were sometimes derived from the names of their mentors (particularly in painting studios), in which case they could be considered yagō. More often, these art-names or pen names are called kagō (家号), or simply gō (号), in Japanese.

During the Edo period, merchant houses took yagō, which functioned as surnames. Patterns include the name of a province combined with ya, resulting in examples such as Kagaya and Echigoya, and an indicator of occupation, such as Minatoya (minato, meaning "harbor", indicating someone in shipping or trade). Some of these survive as surnames today.

== Bibliography ==
- "yagō". (1985). Kodansha Encyclopedia of Japan. Tokyo: Kodansha Ltd.
