= TBF =

TBF can refer to:

- Grumman TBF Avenger, a World War II torpedo bomber
- tert-Butyl formate, an organic chemical compound with molecular formula C_{5}H_{10}O_{2}
- The Beat Fleet, Croatian rap group
- The Black Fish, an international marine conservation organisation
- Tingle's Balloon Fight, a game for the Nintendo DS
- To be fair, internet slang
- Token bucket filter, a network flow control algorithm
- Total Batters Faced, a baseball statistic
- Turkish Basketball Federation
- Türkiye Bisiklet Federasyonu, the Turkish Cycling Federation
