= Japanese family =

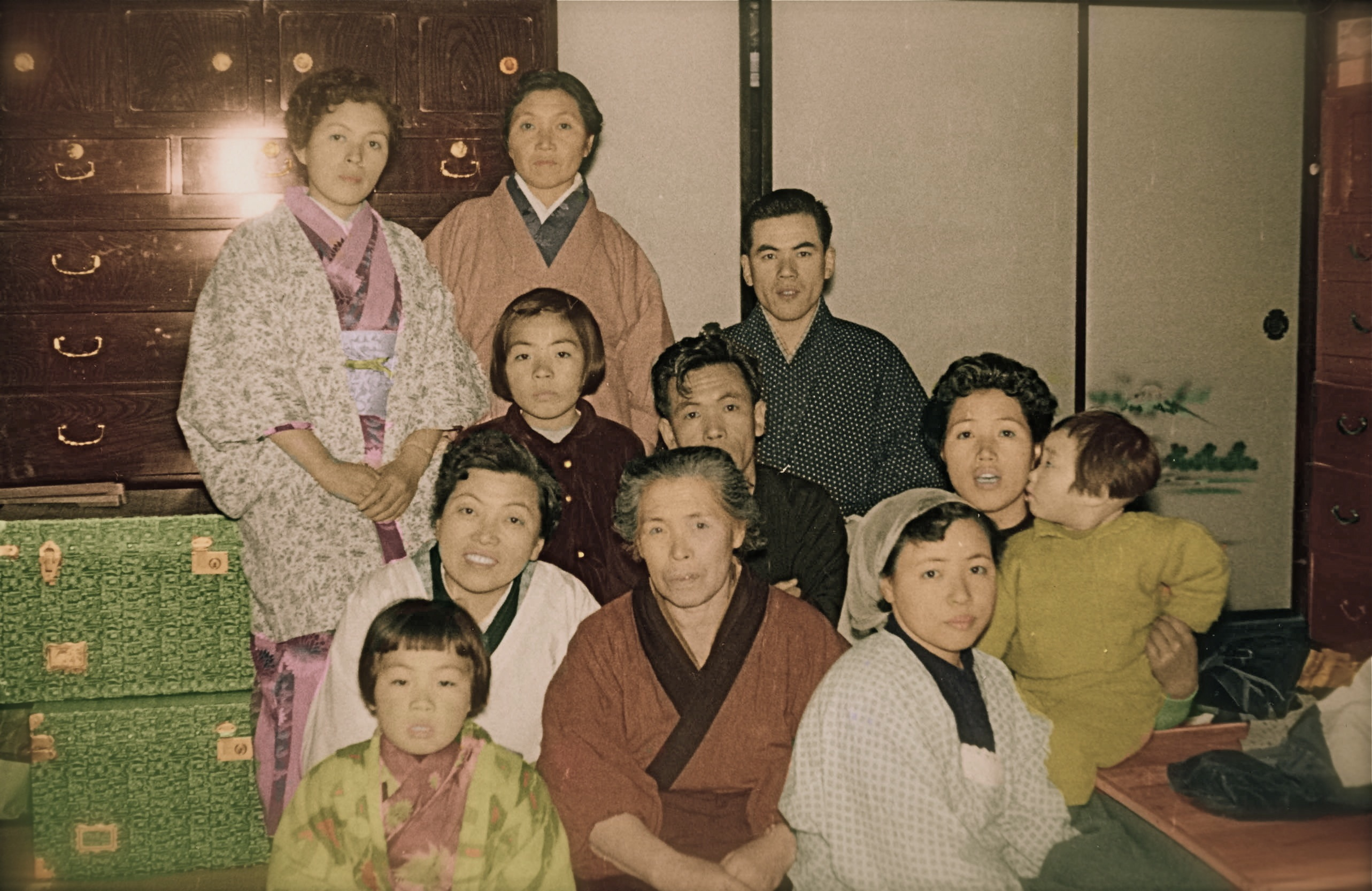
A Japanese family of all ages

The family is called kazoku (家族) in Japanese. It is primarily composed of a couple as is the family in other societies. The Japanese family is based on the line of descent and adoption. Ancestors and offspring are linked together by an idea of genealogy, keizu, which rather than relationships based on mere blood inheritance and succession refers to a bond inherent in the maintenance and continuance of the family as an institution.

In any given period of history, all family members have been expected to contribute to the perpetuation of the family, which is held to be the highest duty of the member.

== History ==
A great number of family forms have existed historically in Japan, from the matrilocal customs of the Heian.

As official surveys conducted during the early years of the Meiji dynasty demonstrated, the most common family form during the Edo (Tokugawa) period was characterized by patrilocal residence, stem structure, and patrilineal primogeniture, so a set of laws were promulgated institutionalizing this family pattern, beginning with the "Outline of the New Criminal Law" in 1870. In 1871, individuals were registered in an official family registry (戸籍, koseki).

In the early twentieth century, each family was required to conform to the ie (家; household) system, with a multigenerational household under the legal authority of a household head. In establishing the ie system, the government moved the ideology of family in the opposite direction of trends resulting from urbanization and industrialization. The ie system took as its model for the family the Confucian-influenced pattern of the upper classes of the Tokugawa period.

Authority and responsibility for all members of the ie lay legally with the household head. Each generation supplied a male and female adult, with a preference for inheritance by the first son and for patrilocal marriage. When possible, daughters were expected to marry out, and younger sons were expected to establish their own households.

=== Post-World War II ===
The percentage of births to unmarried women in selected countries, 1980 and 2007. As can be seen in the figure, Japan has not followed the trend of other Western countries of children born outside of marriage to the same degree.

After World War II, the Allied occupation forces established a new family ideology based on equal rights for women, equal inheritance by all children, and free choice of spouse and career. From the late 1960s, most marriages in Japan have been based on the mutual attraction of the couple and not the arrangement by the parents (お見合い, omiai). Moreover, arranged marriages might begin with an introduction by a relative or family friend, but actual negotiations do not begin until all parties, including the bride and groom, are satisfied with the relationship.

Under the ie system, only a minority of households included three generations at a time because nonsuccessor sons (those who were not heirs) often set up their own household. From 1970 to 1983, the proportion of three-generation households fell from 19% to 15% of all households, while two generation households consisting of a couple and their unmarried children increased only slightly, from 41% to 42% of all households. The greatest change has been the increase in couple-only households and in elderly single-person households.

Public opinion surveys in the late 1980s seemed to confirm the statistical movement away from the three-generation ie family model. Half of the respondents did not think that the first son had a special role to play in the family, and nearly two-thirds rejected the need for mukoyōshi adoption of a son in order to continue the family. Other changes, such as an increase in filial violence and school refusal, suggest a breakdown of strong family authority.

Official statistics indicate that Japanese concepts of family continued to diverge from those in the United States in the 1980s. The divorce rate, although increasing slowly, remained at 1.3 per 1,000 marriages in 1987, low by international standards. Strong gender roles remained the cornerstone of family responsibilities. Most survey respondents said that family life should emphasize parent-child ties over husband-wife relations. Nearly 80% of respondents in a 1986 government survey believed that the ancestral home and family grave should be carefully kept and handed on to one's children. More than 60% thought it best for elderly parents to live with one of their children.

This sense of family as a unit that continues through time is stronger among people who have a livelihood to pass down, such as farmers, merchants, owners of small companies, and physicians, than among urban salary and wage earners. Anthropologist Jane M. Bachnik noted the continued emphasis on continuity in the rural families she studied. Uchi (here, the contemporary family) were considered the living members of an ie, which had no formal existence. Yet, in each generation, there occurred a sorting of members into permanent and temporary members, defining different levels of uchi.

Various family life-styles exist side by side in contemporary Japan. In many urban salaryman families, the husband may commute to work and return late, having little time with his children except for Sundays, a favorite day for family outings. The wife might be a "professional housewife", with nearly total responsibility for raising children, ensuring their careers and marriages, running the household, and managing the family budget. She also has primary responsibility for maintaining social relations with the wider circles of relatives, neighbors, and acquaintances and for managing the family's reputation. Her social life remains separate from that of her husband. It is increasingly likely that in addition to these family responsibilities, she may also have a part-time job or participate in adult education or other community activities. The closest emotional ties within such families are between the mother and children.

In other families, particularly among the self-employed, husband and wife work side by side in a family business. Although gender-based roles are clear cut, they might not be as rigidly distinct as in a household where work and family are more separated. In such families, fathers are more involved in their children's development because they have more opportunity for interacting with them.

As women worked outside of the home with increasing frequency beginning in the 1970s, there was pressure on their husbands to take on more responsibility for housework and child care. Farm families, who depend on nonfarm employment for most of their income, are also developing patterns of interaction different from those of previous generations.

The monogamous and patriarchal family has prevailed since the eighth century. If a wife had no children, the husband often maintained a concubine, whose offspring succeeded the family's headquarters, thus ensuring its continuation. When neither the wife nor the concubine gave him a son, the custom allowed the head of the family to adopt a successor.

Household members can be classified into two categories:

- socially recognized as related in the family line, chokkei, which includes successors, their spouses and possible successors,
- socially recognized members as external family members, bokei, under which all other members of the family are grouped family, including relatives and servants.

== Succession ==
In the traditional Japanese family, one male offspring who is to succeed to the headship of the family lives with his parents after his marriage. He assumes the headship and has to take care of the parents when they have become aged. In addition, he is responsible for the support of bokei member and directs the labor of family members in the management of the household. Couples in successive generations live together under the same roof.

Succession in the Japanese family does not simply mean inheritance of the deceased's property; and the inheritance of property itself has a distinctive meaning, which reflects the institutional demands of the family. Succession in Japan means katokusozoku, or succession to family headship.

Katokusozoku aims to achieve directly the continuation of the family as an institution. The patriarch, responsible for family continuation, has to decide in advance who is the man to succeed him in the event of his death. He usually selects a certain son as the candidate for his successor. When he has no offspring at all, the patriarch often adopts both a boy as his successor and a girl as the successor's wife. In mukoyōshi adoption, it does not matter whether or not the boy and the girl concerned have blood relationship with the patriarch or with his wife.

The traditional ideal of the ie system designates the oldest son as an heir to the family, and expects his family to live with his parents. When the oldest son is not available or not able to assume this position, one of the younger sons may do so. The elderly parents may opt for living with one of their married daughters, usually when they have no available son. Implied here is a sex/age hierarchy in terms of living with the parents, descending from oldest son to youngest son, and oldest to youngest daughter. It thus can be expected that oldest sons and oldest daughters without brothers are more likely to live with their parents than other children.

== See also ==
- Family law in Japan
- Bunke
- Honke
- Yagō
- Koseki
- Ie (Japanese family system)
- Family policy in Japan
- Mukoyōshi

== Bibliography ==
- Ariga, K. (1954). "The Family in Japan". Marriage and Family Living. 16 (4): 362–368. doi:10.2307/348444. JSTOR 348444.
- Johnson, E. (1964). "The Stem Family and Its Extension in Present Day Japan". American Anthropologist. New Series. 66 (4, Part 1): 839–851. doi:10.1525/aa.1964.66.4.02a00070.
- Kamo, Y. (1990). "Husbands and Wives Living in Nuclear and Stem Family Households in Japan". Sociological Perspectives. 33 (3): 397–417. doi:10.2307/1389067. JSTOR 1389067. S2CID 143576513.
- Kitaoji, H. (1971). "The Structure of the Japanese Family". American Anthropologist. 73 (5): 1036–1057. doi:10.1525/aa.1971.73.5.02a00050.
- Koyano, S. (1964). "Changing Family Behavior in Four Japanese Communities". Journal of Marriage and the Family. 26 (2): 149–159. doi:10.2307/349721. JSTOR 349721.
- Mosk, Carl (1980). "Nuptiality in Meiji Japan". Journal of Social History. 13 (3): 474–489. doi:10.1353/jsh/13.3.474.
- Spencer, R. F.; Imamura, K. (1950). "Notes on the Japanese Kinship System". Journal of the American Oriental Society. 70 (3): 165–173. doi:10.2307/596262. JSTOR 596262.
- Takakusu, J. (1906). "The Social and Ethical Value of the Family System in Japan". International Journal of Ethics. 17 (1): 100–106. doi:10.1086/206267. JSTOR 2376103.
- Wilkinson, T. O. (1962). "Family Structure and Industrialization in Japan". American Sociological Review. 27 (5): 678–682. doi:10.2307/2089625. JSTOR 2089625.
