= Mukoyōshi =

Form of Japanese adult adoption

A mukoyōshi (婿養子; lit. 'adopted son-in-law') is an adult man who is adopted into a Japanese family as a daughter's husband, and who takes the family's surname.

Generally in Japan, a woman takes her husband's name and is adopted into his family. When a family, especially one with a well established business, has no male heir but has an unwed daughter of a suitable age, she will marry the mukoyōshi, a man chosen especially for his ability to run the family business. If there is no daughter, the candidate can take a bride from outside his adopted family – fūfu-yōshi (夫婦養子; lit. spousal adoption). This is done to preserve the business and name of the family when there is no suitable male heir, since traditionally businesses are inherited by the oldest male heir through primogeniture. Mukoyōshi is also practiced if there is no capable male heir to run the family business.

This is a centuries-old tradition and is still widely practiced today. Many Japanese companies with household names, such as Nintendo, Kikkoman, and Toyota, are owned by families that have adopted this practice.

This adult adoption may take place in marriages where the woman's family is of a higher socio-economic rank than the man's family; where the woman has no brothers who can continue the family name; when the man has been disowned by his own family; and/or when the man's natural family has a notorious or shameful background and he prefers to hide his identity. A non-Japanese husband may also take his Japanese wife's surname instead of Japanizing his own when he takes Japanese nationality.

== Sources ==
- Hanley, Susan; Wolf, Arthur (1985). Family and Population in East Asian History. Stanford University Press. ISBN 0-8047-1232-8.
- Hendry, Joy (1989). Marriage in changing Japan: community and society. C.E. Tuttle Co. ISBN 0-8048-1506-2.
- Tamura, Linda (1993). The Hood River Issei: An Oral History of Japanese Settlers in Oregon's Hood River Valley. University of Illinois Press. ISBN 0-252-06359-7.
