= Ie (Japanese family system) =

Japanese family system

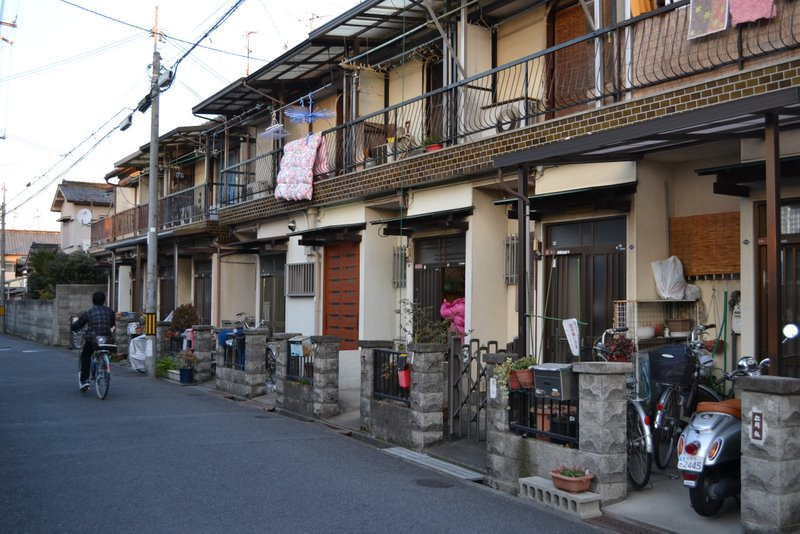
The physical ie: a Japanese House

Ie (家) is a Japanese term which translates directly to household. It can mean either a physical home or refer to a family's lineage. It is popularly used as the "traditional" family structure. The physical definition of an ie consists of an estate that includes a house, rice paddies and vegetable gardens, and its own section in the local cemetery. The symbolic definition of ie has been referred to as the cultural medium for the physical processes of kinship, such as mating and procreation. The symbolic ie refers not only to blood lines, however, but also to economic and socioreligious functions that take place within the family.

== Family registration and status ==
The ie is a patriarchal household and is considered to consist of grandparents, their son, his wife and their children. In a "traditional" Japanese household, the eldest son inherits the household property as well as the responsibility of taking care of his parents as they age. The eldest son is also expected to live with his parents when they grow older.

Today all households are obligated to record their information in the koseki, the family registration system, which records any and all changes in family composition and identity. The koseki also requires a household to appoint one person as the head of the house. Although a woman may also be head of household, the heads are typically male (98 percent of households elect a male as the head of the household). Once the head is chosen, other members of the house must change their surnames to that of the head. Japanese law obligates married spouses to have the same surname. Although the chosen surname can be of the wife too, this rarely happens. In 2015, the Japanese Supreme Court upheld the constitutionality of the law, noting that women could use their maiden names informally, and stating that it was for the legislature to decide on whether to pass new legislation on separate spousal names. Even with the death of a koseki, the family will keep the name as long as they are listed in the system as part of his koseki. One to two generations can be included in a koseki, a couple and their children. If a household consists of grandparents and children, then the grandparents must start to have their own koseki. This system has been noted to be particularly strict in that it excludes any families who do not fit into the patrilineal structure encouraged by the koseki. Another important aspect of the ie is the role of dead ancestors. Dead ancestors may be separated into two categories: the "generation dead", and the "juvenile dead." "Generation dead" are husband and wife pairs who held the status of household heads during their living years. These ancestors are representative of the history of the ie and provide living members of the ie means of relating to their history and ancestors. They play a pivotal role in the daily lives of most Japanese households in that they must be given a great deal of respect and are commemorated through Buddhist rites. In contrast, if an ancestor does not qualify as a "generation dead" then they are considered "juvenile dead" and are destined to be forgotten.

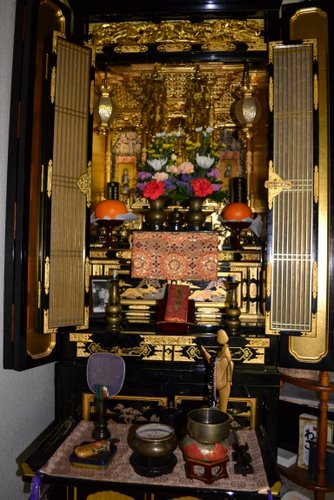
Butsudan used in the ie for ancestor worship and offering

== Arranged marriage ==
Marital and affinial ties are of great concern to the identity of an ie and therefore arranged marriage was very common in Japan prior to World War II. Studies have shown that families in the middle and upper classes are more committed to arranged marriages than those in lower classes because they are most concerned with the security of the household and recognize that “romantic love, ren’ai, cannot be counted on.”

== Household duties ==
The ie is often defined by the gendered roles within a family. These roles are most often exemplified by the household duties that each family member is expected to uphold. Until recently, wives took on the duties of cooking, cleaning, and raising the children, while the typical husband served as a salary man and earned the income for the family. While this familial structure is still in place, it is changing as more and more women join the workforce. Among the lower class society, a rising number of women are achieving economic independence and good career prospects leading to a shift in the typical patriarchic society. Today, the Japanese government has encouraged working fathers to become Iku-men (or stay-at-home fathers), and in 1992, the Japanese government passed a law that allowed for time off for both the mother and the father of a newborn child.

== See also ==
- Bunke
- Honke
- Imperial House of Japan
- Japanese family
