= Honke =

Main household of Japanese family

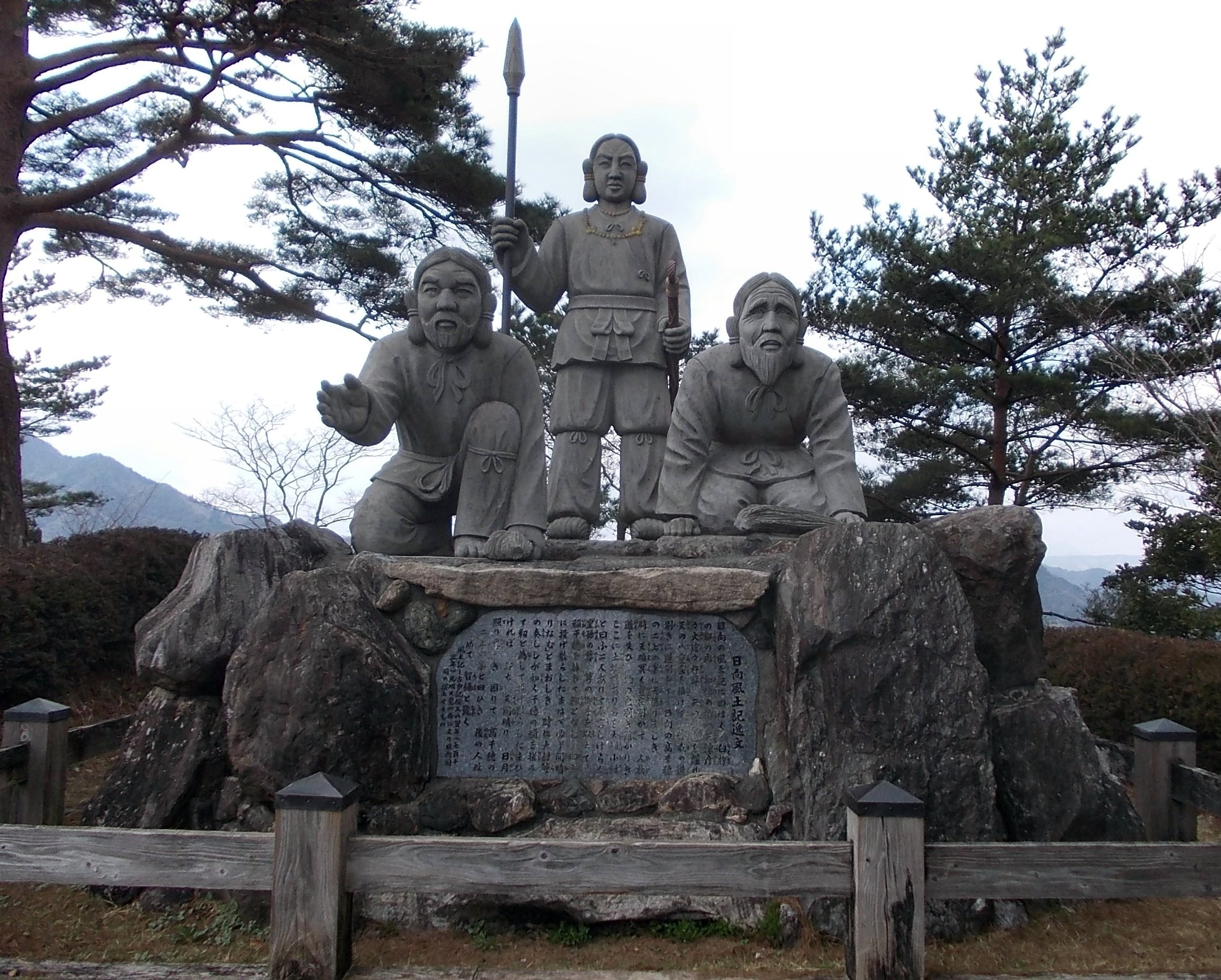
Ninigi-no-Mikoto is the honke of the first Japanese imperial household.

The Honke (本家) is the main household of Japanese family. It is part of the system of family branching that establishes a multiplied structure to create familial relationships.

The head of a household and his successor reside in the honke, while collateral branches establish bunke. The genealogical relationship between honke and bunke is determined by the ie family system. The honke establishes the new branch family while bunke is linked to it since both are part of the ie. They can be described in terms of vertical relationships where the branch is subordinated to the main household. This system also determines how the access to resources is ordered.

The honke-bunke relationship can be demonstrated in the case of the imperial household, which is said to have descended from its founder Amaterasu-omikami. Her grandson Ninigi-no-Mikoto is the honke while the other branches of the family or those distantly related members of the household are the bunke through the branching of the ie.

The honke–bunke relationship is also reflected in the relationship between Japanese companies and their subsidiaries. In the 1700s, businesses ran by families followed rules that contained details on mutual relationships between the honke as the main line and the bunke or the branch lines. In this hierarchy, which also covered management practices, there are separate branches called bekke, which were set up for employees.

== See also ==
- Japanese family structure
- Koseki
