= FishAct =

Marine conservation organisation based in Amsterdam

- Founded: 2010
- Type: Registered charity (Germany)
- Purpose: Marine conservation, Overfishing
- Location: Bremen, Germany
- Method: Investigations, Public Awareness, Direct action
- Key people: International Director: Valeska Diemel
- Website: fishact.org, 2048.fishact.org
- Formerly called: The Black Fish

FishAct (formerly The Black Fish) is an international marine conservation and activism organisation based in Amsterdam, Netherlands. Its name was changed in 2018 to FishAct. FishAct's stated mission is to "end the industrial overfishing of the oceans" and to "empower individuals to get actively involved in building grassroots citizen-led conservation communities". The non-governmental organisation was founded in 2010 and has active local chapters in Germany and the United Kingdom. To achieve its goals, the organisation uses a combination of investigation, education, and non-violent direct-action. Campaigns have included gathering support for the release of captive cetaceans, actions against dolphin drive hunts and campaigning to end overfishing of the endangered bluefin tuna in the Mediterranean Sea.

== History ==
In September 2010, activists of The Black Fish cut the nets of holding pens in the harbour of Taiji, Japan, to allow dolphins to escape, which were destined for the international dolphinarium trade. Captain Paul Watson of the Sea Shepherd Conservation Society publicly questioned the effectiveness of the action, saying nets had been cut but no dolphins had managed to escape. These allegations were later answered by the activists involved, claiming dolphins did escape from the pens.

After only a few weeks of campaigning by The Black Fish and other organisations for the closure of a run-down dolphinarium in Münster, Germany, in the fall of 2010, its owners announced that the facility would be closed down and the four dolphins kept there, re-homed.

By early 2011, The Black Fish had founded the Orca Coalition together with seven other organisation, with the aim of securing freedom for a captive orca named Morgan. The young female killer whale had stranded on the Dutch coast in June 2010. Although she regained her strength and was nursed back to health, the dolphinarium where she was held refuses to release her, instead planning for a transfer to the marine park Loro Parque on the Spanish Island of Tenerife. The initial legal proceedings brought against the responsible Ministry by the Orca Coalition secured a landmark court ruling, effectively blocking the export of a captive cetacean for the first time. However, two months later a second judge ruled that orca Morgan could be moved to Loro Parque.

In July 2012 the organisation successfully released over 1.000 endangered bluefin tuna from a tuna farm off the island of Ugljan, Croatia. English writer and environmentalist George Monbiot hailed the action and branded the activists as heroes for 'putting their lives on the line in the fight to save endangered tuna'. Croatian Deputy Fisheries Minister Ljubomir Kucic criticised the action, proclaiming that bluefin tuna are 'not that endangered'.

In December 2012 a stranded humpback whale off the Dutch coast gathered a lot of controversy as local authorities refused access to the stranding site by independent cetacean experts to free the animal. After an initial attempt by local authorities to pull the animal back to open water had failed, the local mayor declared a state of emergency, prohibiting anyone from entering the site. For a number of days the whale lived on, even after an unsuccessful euthanasia attempt. On the 5th day after the stranding, The Black Fish deployed a boat and visited the stranding site with Dutch politician Marianne Thieme and a medical team to assess whether or not animal was still alive. The Black Fish skipper and one of the boat's crew were held by police and a report was filed for possible charges of breaching the state of emergency.

In an interview with The Guardian in August 2012, co-founder of The Black Fish, Wietse van der Werf, announced that the organisation's focus would switch exclusively to exposing and challenging illegal and destructive fishing practices in the Mediterranean Sea, with initial actions aimed at combating illegal bluefin tuna fishing and the illegal use of driftnets. The BBC broadcast a programme in April 2013, in which The Black Fish founder Wietse van der Werf announced that the organisation will start using drones to patrol for illegal fishing activity in the Mediterranean.

== See also ==
- Marine conservation activism
