= Bunke =

A bunke (分家) is a branch family established by a collateral of the honke (the line descended through the eldest male) in Japan.

== See also ==
- Ie (Japanese family system)
- Japanese family structure
- Koseki
