= Dōjōji =

Dōjōji (道成寺) may refer to:

- Dōjō-ji, a Buddhist temple in Wakayama Prefecture, Japan
- Dōjōji (Noh play)
- Dōjōji, a 1957 play by Yukio Mishima
- Musume Dōjōji, a Kabuki dance drama based on the Noh play that may also be referred to as Dōjōji
