= Bonshō =

Large bells in Buddhist temples in Japan

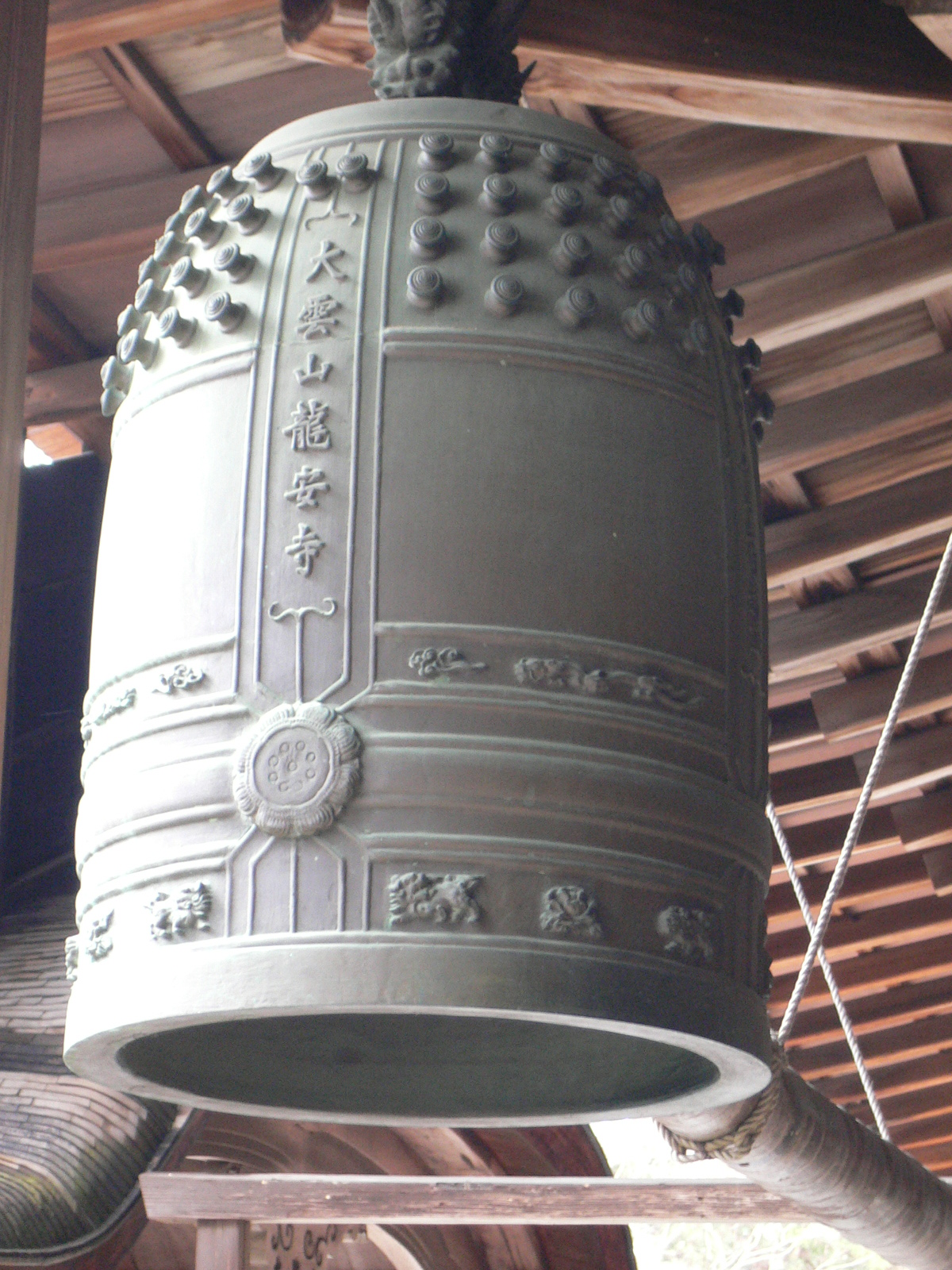
- Bonshō at Ryōan-ji – the lotus-shaped tsuki-za (striking panel) is visible at the front, and the suspended beam known as a shu-moku hangs in the background

Percussion instrument
- Other names: Tsurigane; Ōgane
- Classification: Percussion; Idiophone
- Hornbostel–Sachs classification: 111.242.121 (Hanging bells without internal strikers)
- Developed: Yamato period (based on earlier Chinese bells)

Related instruments
- Bianzhong; Gong; Kane; Suzu

Bonshō (梵鐘, Buddhist bells), also known as tsurigane (釣り鐘, hanging bells) or ōgane (大鐘, great bells) are large bells found in Buddhist temples throughout Japan, used to summon the monks to prayer and to demarcate periods of time. Rather than containing a clapper, bonshō are struck from the outside, using either a handheld mallet or a beam suspended on ropes.

The bells are usually made from bronze, using a form of expendable mould casting. They are typically augmented and ornamented with a variety of bosses, raised bands and inscriptions. The earliest of these bells in Japan date to around 600 CE, although the general design is of much earlier Chinese origin and shares some of the features seen in ancient Chinese bells. The bells' penetrating and pervasive tone carries over considerable distances, which led to their use as signals, timekeepers and alarms. In addition, the sound of the bell is thought to have supernatural properties; it is believed, for example, that it can be heard in the underworld.

The spiritual significance of bonshō means that they play an important role in Buddhist ceremonies, particularly the New Year and Bon festivals. Throughout Japanese history these bells have become associated with stories and legends, both fictional, such as the Benkei Bell of Mii-dera, and historical, such as the bell of Hōkō-ji. In modern times, bonshō have become symbols of world peace.

== Origin ==
The bonshō is derived from the bianzhong (henshō (編鐘) in Japanese), an ancient Chinese court instrument comprising a series of tuned bells. One larger additional bell, which eventually developed into the bonshō, was used as a tuning device and a summons to listeners to attend a bianzhong recital. According to legend, the earliest bonshō may have come from China to Japan via the Korean Peninsula. The Nihon Shoki records that Ōtomo no Satehiko brought three bronze bells back to Japan in 562 as spoils of war from Goguryeo.

== Construction ==
One of the bells at Mii-dera being sounded by a shu-moku

Bonshō are cast in a single piece using two moulds, a core and a shell, in a process that is largely unchanged since the Nara period (710–794). The core is constructed from a dome of stacked bricks made from hardened sand, whilst the shell is made using a strickle board. This is a large, flat, wooden board shaped like a cross-section of the bell, which is rotated around a vertical axis to shape the clay used for the mould. Inscriptions and decorations are then carved or impressed into the clay. The shell fits over the core to create a narrow gap, into which the molten bronze is poured at a temperature of over 1,050 °C (1,920 °F). The ratio of the alloy is usually around 17:3 copper to tin; the exact admixture (as well as the speed of the cooling process) can alter the tone of the end product. After the metal has cooled and solidified, the mould is removed by breaking it, therefore a new one has to be created for each bell. The process has a high failure rate; only around 50 per cent of castings are successful on the first attempt, without cracks or imperfections.

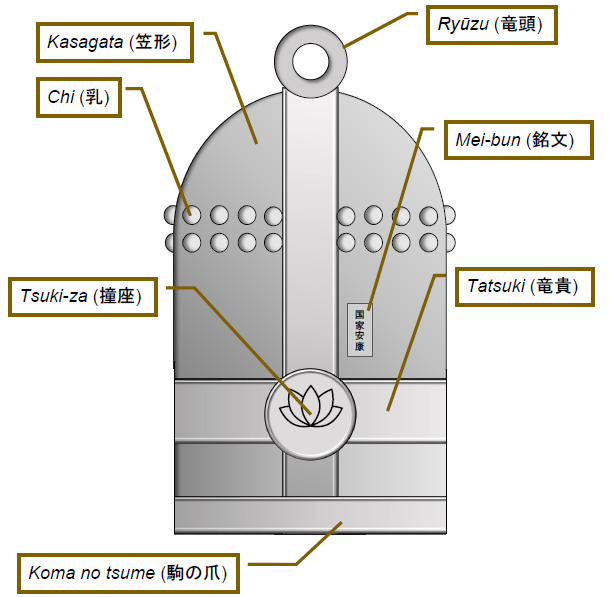
Diagram showing the various parts of a Japanese temple bell

The casting is traditionally accompanied by the chanting of Buddhist sutras, which may go on for several hours. Buddhist prayer papers, sprigs of sacred mulberry and other ceremonial offerings are added to the molten bronze during the founding process.

There are several parts to a temple bell:

- Ryūzu (竜頭), the dragon-shaped handle at the top of the bell, by which it is carried or hung
- Kasagata (笠形), the domed crown of the bell
- Chi (乳; or nyū), bosses around the upper part of the bell that improve its resonance
- Koma no tsume (駒の爪), lower rim
- Tsuki-za (撞座), striking panel, a reinforced spot where the bell is struck. It is often decorated with a Buddhist lotus or chrysanthemum motif.
- Tatsuki (竜貴), decorative horizontal bands
- Mei-bun (銘文), inscription (often giving the bell's history)
- Shu-moku (手木), the hanging wooden beam used to strike the tsuki-za

Some bells retain linear impressions arising from joints in the mould used; they are not removed during fettling but are regarded as an aspect of the bell's overall beauty. The bell's appearance and sound are intended to be in keeping with Japan's wabi-sabi aesthetic.

== Sound ==
Chomei-ji no Bonshō
Sound of the bell in Chomei Temple, Ōmihachiman

Japanese temple bells are struck externally with either a hammer or a suspended beam rather than with an internal clapper. The sound of the bell is made up of three parts. First is the atari, the impact of the strike. A well-made bell should produce a clean, clear tone. The initial sound of the strike is immediately followed by the prolonged oshi, the reverberation that continues to sound after the bell is struck. This is higher in pitch and is a low rumble with a sorrowful air, rich in harmonics; it lasts for up to ten seconds. Finally comes the okuri or decay, the resonance that is heard as the vibration of the bell dies away, which can last up to a minute. There are also continuous harmonic overtones heard throughout the tolling of the bell. These multiple tones create a complex pitch profile.

The low tone and deep resonance of the bell allow the sound to carry over great distances; a large bonshō can be heard up to 32 kilometres (20 miles) away on a clear day. The pitch of the bell is carefully judged by its creators, and a difference of a single hertz in the fundamental frequency can require that the bell be recast from scratch.

== Function and significance ==
Bonshō are sited in Buddhist temples, usually in a specially designated building or tower called a shōrō (鐘楼). They are used to mark the passage of time, and to call the monks to liturgical services. In Buddhism, the bell's sound is considered to be calming and to induce a suitable atmosphere for meditation. Because of their shape (with sloped shoulders and a flat base) the bells are seen as representations of the sitting Buddha, and are accorded similar respect; those striking the bell will first make three bows towards it, just as they would before a statue of Buddha.

The sonorous sound of the bell was also used to warn of impending typhoons and as a general alert. Because the ringing of a temple bell could be heard over considerable distances, it was also sometimes used for other signalling purposes; there are records of temple bells being used for military communication from as far back as the Genpei War (1180–1185 CE). Smaller versions were subsequently cast for battlefield use, as the large temple bells were too heavy and unwieldy to transport. These smaller bonshō were used primarily as alarms to warn of enemy attacks; commands were given using drums and conches.

As part of Japanese New Year celebrations, people queue to ring the temple bells 108 times in a ceremony known as Joyanokane (除夜の鐘, "New Year bells"); the 108 peals of the bell are intended to purge humanity of the 108 earthly temptations. During the Buddhist Bon Festival, a special type of bonshō called an ōkubo-ōgane (大久保大鐘, "great hollow bell") is rung. This bell is hung above a well, and it is believed that the sound of the bell resonates down the well into the underworld, to summon the spirits of the dead. At the end of the festival, another bonshō, called an okurikane (送り鐘, "sending-back bell"), is rung to send the spirits back and to represent the end of the summer.

During World War II the demand for metal for the war effort resulted in many bells being melted down for scrap. As a result, those that survived are generally regarded as important historic artifacts. More than 70,000 bells (approximately 90 per cent of the bonshō then in existence) were destroyed in this way. However, rapid production of bells during the post-war period meant that by 1995 the number of temple bells in Japan had returned to pre-war levels.

In the latter half of the 20th century, the World Peace Bell Association was set up in Japan, with the purpose of funding and casting temple bells to be placed around the world as symbols of peace. Bonshō have also been cast in response to natural disasters such as the 2011 Tōhoku earthquake and tsunami; several affected communities commissioned bells to commemorate the event.

Bonshō have occasionally been used as musical instruments in modern compositions. The recorded sound of temple bells was used in Mayuzumi Toshiro's piece Olympic Campanology, used to open the 1964 Tokyo Olympic Games. A temple bell is also used in performances of Jacob Druckman's piece Lamia, in which it is rung while placed on top of a kettledrum. Modern composers for percussion have sometimes used the temple bell to replace the now common sound of the orchestral tam-tam.

== Notable examples ==
The oldest known bonshō (and the oldest bell in the world still in use) is the Okikicho bell at Myōshin-ji, which was cast in 698. The largest is the bell at Chion-in, which was cast in 1636 and weighs 70 metric tons. It requires a team of 17 to sound it.

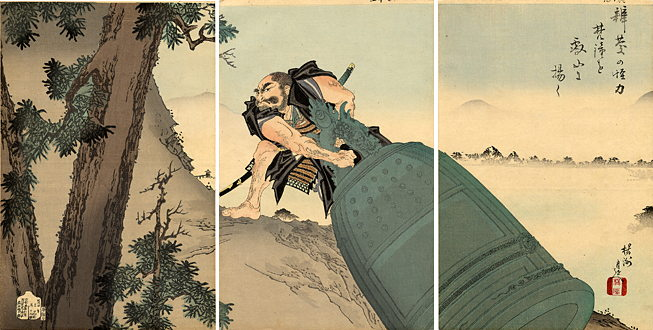
Toyohara Chikanobu, The Giant Bell, c. 1890 ukiyo-e triptych depicting Benkei stealing the Mii-dera bonshō

During the 17th century the bonshō was also a symbol of a temple's leadership; possession of the bell indicated ownership of the associated temple. As a result, bells were often stolen; the folk hero Benkei is said to have dragged the three-ton bell of Mii-dera temple up Mount Hiei during one such theft. The deep scratches in the Benkei bell, which is still displayed at Mii-dera, are said in the legend to be the result of Benkei's kicking the bell all the way back to the monastery when he discovered that it would not toll for him. The Benkei bell is also associated with the legendary hero Tawara Tōda, who originally donated it to the Mii-dera temple. He acquired it as a gift from the dragon deity Ryūjin, after saving the god from a giant centipede.

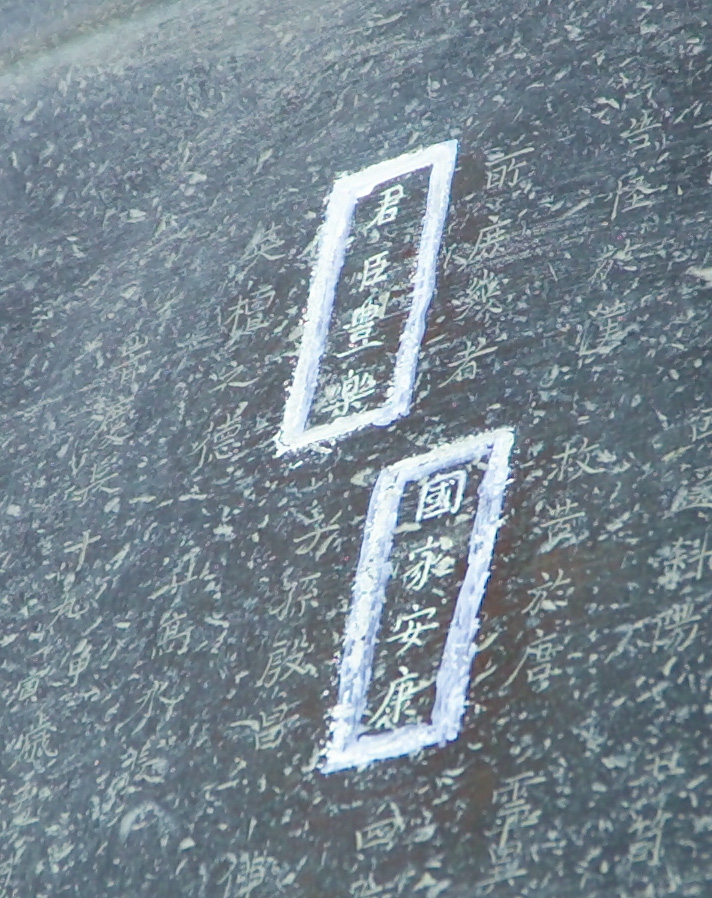
"Kokka ankō"; the disastrous inscription of the Hōkō-ji bell

After the Hōkō-ji temple burned down at the start of the 17th century, Toyotomi Hideyori sponsored its reconstruction in 1610, and commissioned a large bell as part of that process. The bell's inscription drew the ire of Tokugawa Ieyasu, who had become shōgun after wresting power from the Toyotomi clan when Hideyori's father Hideyoshi died. The inscription, "Kokka ankō" (国家安康, 'Peace and tranquility for the nation'), broke up the characters for the shogun's name (家康) with the kanji for "peace" (安). Tokugawa assumed Toyotomi was implying that peace would require the "dismemberment" of the Tokugawa. He used the subsequent dispute as an excuse to wage war on the Toyotomi clan, resulting in the siege of Osaka and the eventual destruction of the Toyotomi.

A bronze bonshō was among the gifts presented to Commodore Matthew Perry upon his arrival in Japan. Cast by bellmakers from the Suwa family of Higo Province, it is now held in the collection of the Smithsonian Institution.

The Noh play Dōjōji (道成寺), one of the only Noh plays to feature a prop of any significant size, is based on a legend concerning the bell of Dōjō-ji. In the story a woman named Kiyohime, the spurned mistress of a Buddhist priest named Anchin, traps her lover inside the temple's bell and then kills him by turning into a snake, coiling around the bell, and cooking him in it. The play was later adapted for kabuki, entitled Musume Dōjōji (娘道成寺, "The Maiden at Dojoji Temple").

The bell of the Nishi-Arai Daishi Temple in Tokyo was removed in 1943, to be melted down as part of the Japanese war effort. The crew of the USS Pasadena found it on a scrap heap and took it with them to the US as a war trophy, donating it to the city of Pasadena; the city council returned the bell to Tokyo in 1955. A similar story accompanies the bell of Manpuku-ji, which was taken to the United States on the USS Boston after the war; in this case, however, the Sendai authorities allowed the bell to remain in Boston as a symbol of friendship between the two cities. The Boston bell is the last WWII bonshō in the United States.

The Japanese Peace Bell at the headquarters of the United Nations in New York was donated by Japan in 1954 as a symbol of world peace. It was created using metal reclaimed from coins and medals provided by donors from around the globe. Similar bells representing a commitment to the cause of world peace can be found in many civic areas, including Hiroshima's Peace Memorial Park. In 1995, the city of Oak Ridge, Tennessee, erected a four-ton peace bell – a replica of one of the Hiroshima bells – in the city centre as part of its fiftieth-anniversary celebrations, and to strengthen ties with Japan. The Oak Ridge Friendship Bell is decorated with dates relating to Oak Ridge's connection to Japan (the uranium used in the Hiroshima atomic bomb was produced in Oak Ridge). In 1998, a local citizen sued the city over the bell, claiming that it was a Buddhist symbol and violated local laws and the US Constitution. The case was ruled in favour of the City of Oak Ridge.

== See also ==
- Dōtaku, a type of bell that was developed during the Yayoi period
- Kane, another suspended bell used in Buddhism
- Suzu, bell used in Shinto shrines
