= Nihon-buyō =

Classical Japanese performing art of dance

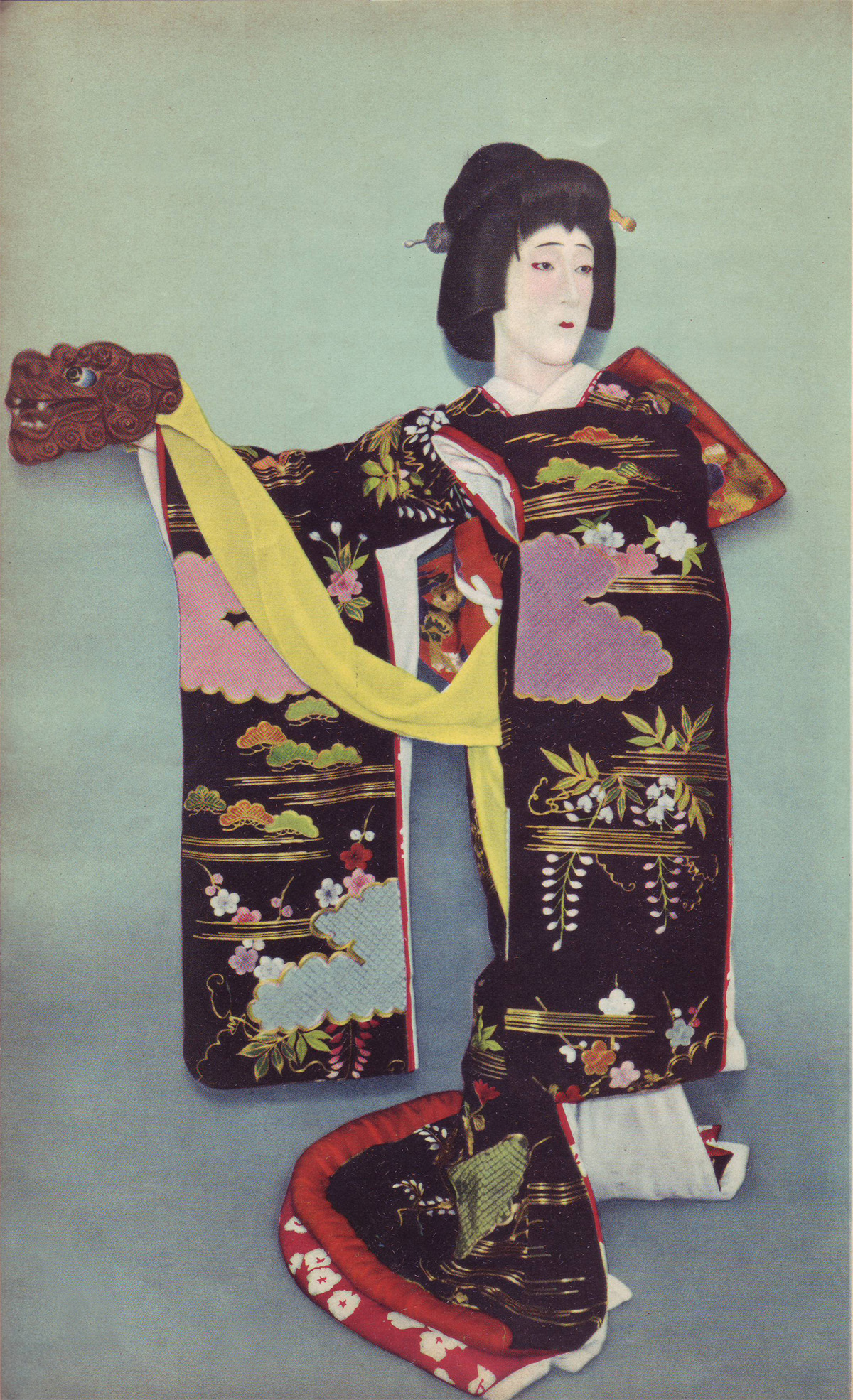
Nakamura Shikan VII in September 1955 in the kabuki-buyō play Kagami-Jishi

Nihon-buyō (日本舞踊, lit. 'Japanese dance') refers to the classical Japanese performing art of dance.

Nihon-buyō developed from earlier dance traditions such as mai and odori, and was further developed during the early Edo period (1603–1867), through the medium of kabuki dances, which often incorporated elements from the older dance genres. Although the term nihon-buyō means "Japanese dance", it is not meant to refer to Japanese dance in general, and instead refers to a few dance genres such as kabuki buyō, which are performed in theatre. Nihon-buyō differs from other varieties of Japanese traditional dance, in that it is a refined style intended as entertainment on a public stage.

The term buyō is a modern term coined during the Meiji period (1868–1911) as a term for "dance", and the writer Tsubouchi Shōyō is believed to have been the first to use the term nihon-buyō. Prior to this, dance was generally referred according to its particular dance genre, such as mai and odori. The term is a combination of the characters mai (舞), which can also be pronounced bu, and odori (踊), which can also be pronounced yō. Shōyō intended nihon-buyō to be a term for Furigoto Geki (振事劇), a form of dance drama in kabuki plays, but the term has now grown to cover several Japanese dance styles, including the modern dance form sosaku buyō. As a genre of dance that has multiple influences, borrows from many different dance traditions developed over a long period, overlaps with theatre and has many different schools, there is some difficulty in defining and categorizing nihon-buyō.

== Definition ==
=== Wider definition ===
In the broad sense, nihon-buyō refers to the dances kabuki-buyō, kamigata-mai and shin-buyō.

- Kabuki buyō (歌舞伎舞踊) - nihon-buyō in the exact definition refers solely to kabuki-buyō alone
- Kamigata-mai (上方舞) or jiuta-mai (地唄舞) - dance born and developed in the region of Kyoto and Osaka (the Kamigata region). Kamigata-mai developed during the Edo period, and would be performed at private parties on a relatively small surface, such as the surface of one tatami mat. Its movements are slow and gentle. It can be accompanied by music (jiuta), composed for a shamisen soloist. It is also called zashiki-mai (座敷舞), referring to the name of the room (zashiki) where it is practiced.
- Shin-buyō (新舞踊) or sōsaku-buyō (創作舞踊) – nihon-buyō has known European and American influences during the 20th century. In the Taishō period (1912–1926), Western arts-inspired writer Tsubouchi Shōyō proposed changes to the performance of kabuki theater, resulting in a new style of dance known as shin-buyō (lit. 'new dance'), performed by artists wanting to experiment with a new form of expression.

=== Narrower definition ===
In the narrow sense, nihon-buyō (日本舞踊) refers solely to kabuki-buyō (歌舞伎舞踊).

The term nihon-buyō dates to the Meiji period. Until then, kabuki-buyō was referred to by various names such as shosagoto (所作事), keigoto (景事), furigoto (振事) or more simply odori (踊).

The choreographers of shosagoto, whose first appearance dates back to around 1673, founded schools to teach this dance to amateurs. Kabuki-buyō, listed as an important intangible cultural property since 1955, is performed by both a kabuki actor and a nihon-buyō dancer.

== Dance styles and elements ==
The dance "Shunkashuto" ("Four Seasons")

Unlike Noh, kyōgen, kabuki and bunraku theater, which feature male performers, nihon-buyō is also performed by women. There are two different dance styles taught in nihon-buyō: onnagata, "female roles", and tachiyaku, "male roles". Thus, a woman can play a male role, and a man can play a female role.

Nihon-buyō has three main elements: mai, odori and furi. Mai is a static and abstract movement with an emphasis on the ritual aspect, which is often present in the adaptation sequences of the nô theater; odori is a dynamic and rhythmic movement resulting from nenbutsu-odori, a dance invented by a Buddhist monk around the 10th century; furi includes theatrical, dramatic and figurative body language (such as writing a letter, drinking sake, etc.), representing the actions of everyday life in the Edo period.

== Influences ==
=== Kabuki ===
Nihon-buyō schools were founded by choreographers (who were originally kabuki musicians or actors), or by actors. These two backgrounds mean that both still share the same dance repertoire.

=== Noh ===
There are many nihon-buyō plays which are inspired by Noh theater plays. The three major series of nihon-buyō - sanbasō mono, dōjōji mono and shakkyō mono - are adapted from the Noh plays Okina, Dōjōji and Shakkyō, as well as the matsubame mono repertoire series, adapted from Noh during the Meiji period, with inspiration taken from the approach of kabuki adapting Noh dramas. For these plays, Noh dance (mai) is integrated into the choreography.

=== Kyōgen ===
Even before the Meiji period, there were already kyōgen-origin kabuki dance plays, but, like Noh, kyōgen was much adapted after the Meiji period, and this repertoire was appropriated by kabuki actors of this period.

=== Bunraku ===
The nihon-buyō plays Ochiudo, Hachidanme and Yoshinoyama, are acts in the kabuki plays adapted from bunraku, Kanadehon Chūshingura and Yoshitsune Senbon Zakura.

In addition, during climaxes of nihon-buyō plays adapted from bunraku (Yagura no Oshichi, Hidakagawa), ningyō-buri (a style of acting imitating the movements of puppets) is used: the character is supported by puppeteers standing behind him and moves as if he was a puppet.

== Plays ==
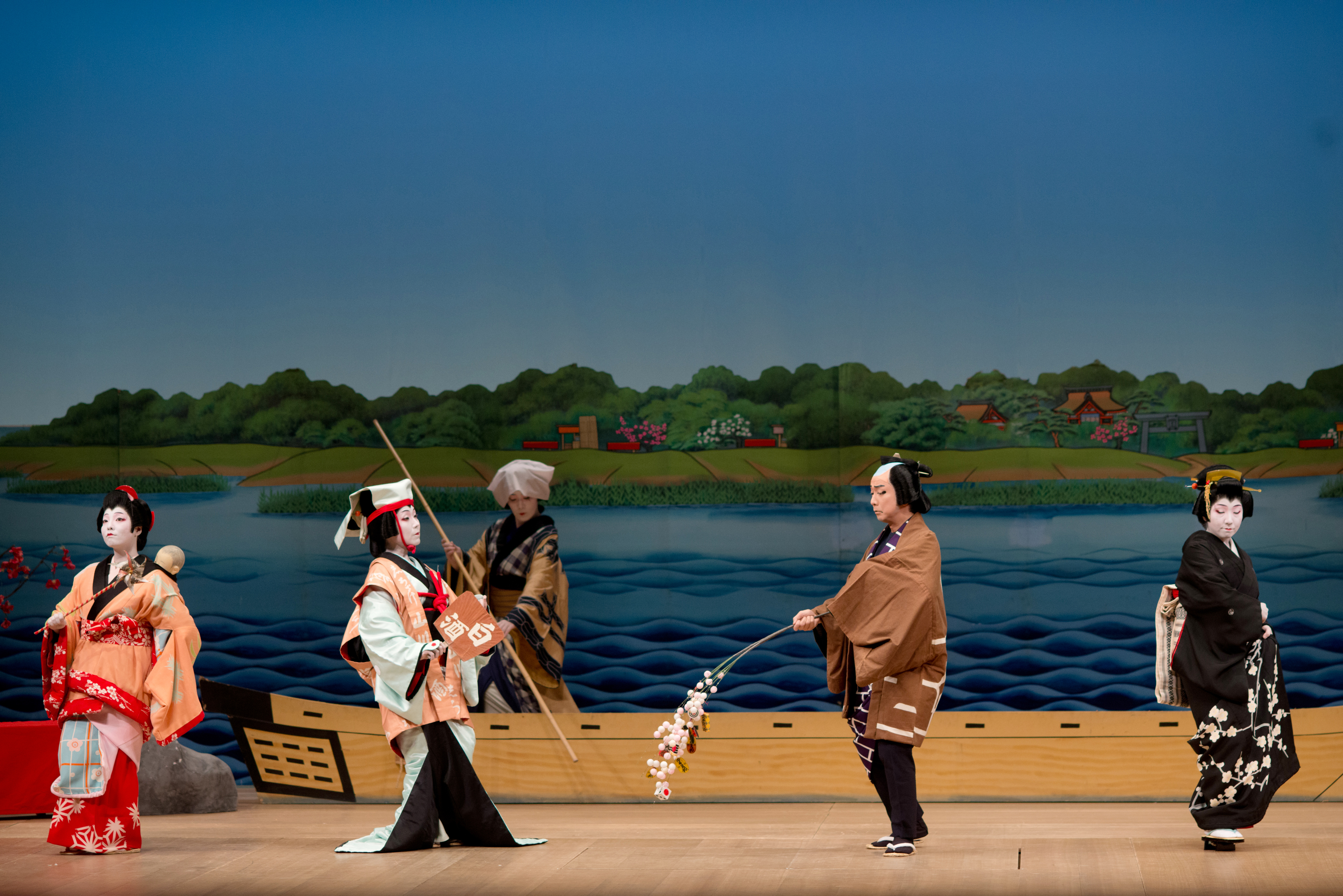
Sengiku Bando in the play Noriai bune

Nihon-buyō plays consists mainly of kabuki dance plays (shosagoto) created in the Edo period, such as Kyōganoko Musume Dōjōji and Fuji Musume. In addition, there are plays choreographed with the kabuki dance technique. The themes of the plays are plentiful: legends, classical literature, historical figures, crime stories, and life and customs in the Edo period. There are also adaptations of Noh, kyōgen, and bunraku theater.

Plays danced by one person take up about 60% of the repertoire, and plays danced by more than two people make up the rest of the repertoire. About 60% of the plays consist of pure dance plays without drama (metamorphosis play, Edo period daily life play, festive play), compared to around 40% dramatic plays.

Not all parts can be classified perfectly, but they can be roughly grouped into the following categories:

=== Sanbasō mono (三番叟物, adaptation of the Noh play Okina) ===
In the Noh play Okina, the most sacred play mixing dance and prayer ritual for a bountiful harvest and prosperity, three characters, Okina, Senzai and Sanbasō, appear. The latter's dynamic dance gave rise to a series of sanbasō mono repertoires in kabuki: the play Kotobuki Shiki Sanbasō is the most ritualistic, and the rest of the repertoire develops the more entertaining aspects for kabuki: Ayatsuri Sanbasō, Ninin Sanbasō, Shitadashi Sanbasō, Hinazuru Sanbasō, Shiki Sanbasō, Kuruwa Sanbasō, etc.

=== Dōjōji mono (道成寺物, adaptation of the Noh play Dōjōji) ===
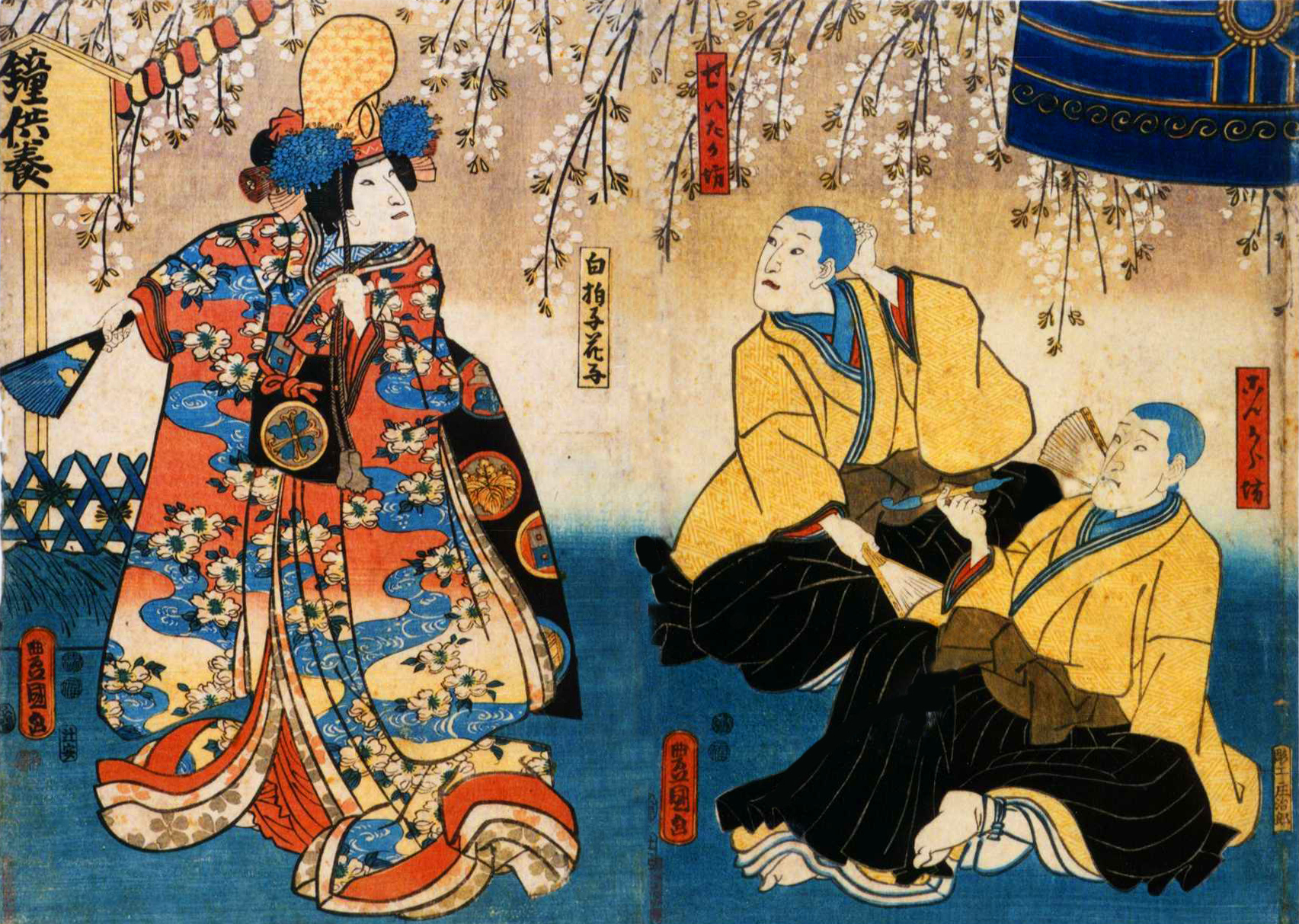
Depiction of the kabuki dance Kyōganoko Musume Dōjōji

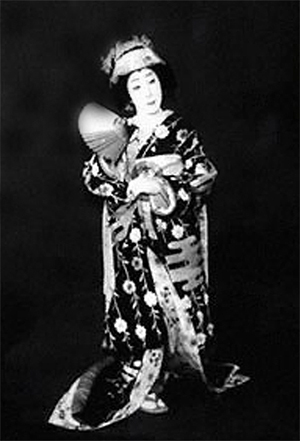
Nakamura Utaemon VI in 1951 in the play Kyōganoko Musume Dōjōji

The Noh Dōjōji play, inspired by the myth of the Dōjōji temple, was adapted in the kabuki dance as Kyōganoko Musume Dōjōji, which then gave birth to the main series of the repertoire: Ninin Dōjōji, Meoto Dōjōji, Kane no Misaki, Otsue Dōjōji, Futaomote Dōjōji, Yakko Dōjōji, etc.

=== Shakkyō mono (石橋物, adaptation of the Noh play Shakkyō) ===
The Noh play Shakkyo, in which the Buddhist monk sees mythical lions playing with peonies at Mount Seiryo in China, was adapted as an onnagata (female role) dance in the early kabuki period, resulting in the plays Aioi Jishi, Shūjaku Jishi and Makura Jishi. It was around the Meiji period that the adaptation came closer to Noh: the majestic lion dance is performed by a tachiyaku (male actor) in the plays Kagami Jishi and Renjishi.

=== Onryō mono (怨霊物, phantom plays) ===
A number of nihon-buyō center around stories of ghosts or phantoms.

Asama mono (浅間物)
A newly-engaged man burns the letter of a courtesan, with whom he had a love affair. In the smoke, the spirit of the courtesan appears and speaks resentfully. The play, Keisei Asamadake, gave variations such as Takao Zange (confession of keisei (literally "castle-toppler", a moniker given to courtesans) Takao).
Futaomote mono (双面物)
Two characters with totally identical appearances dance together, and one reveals his true, ghostly nature: this style, which originated in a Noh play Futari Shizuka ("The two Shizuka"), has become in vogue with many plays as Futago Sumidagawa from Chikamatsu Monzaemon. The most famous plays are Futaomote (the last act of the kabuki play Hōkaibō) and Futaomote Dōjōji. In these plays, the main character is a ghost with two spirits inside. The souls of two lovers who have killed each other come together in an vengeful half-male, half-female spirit.

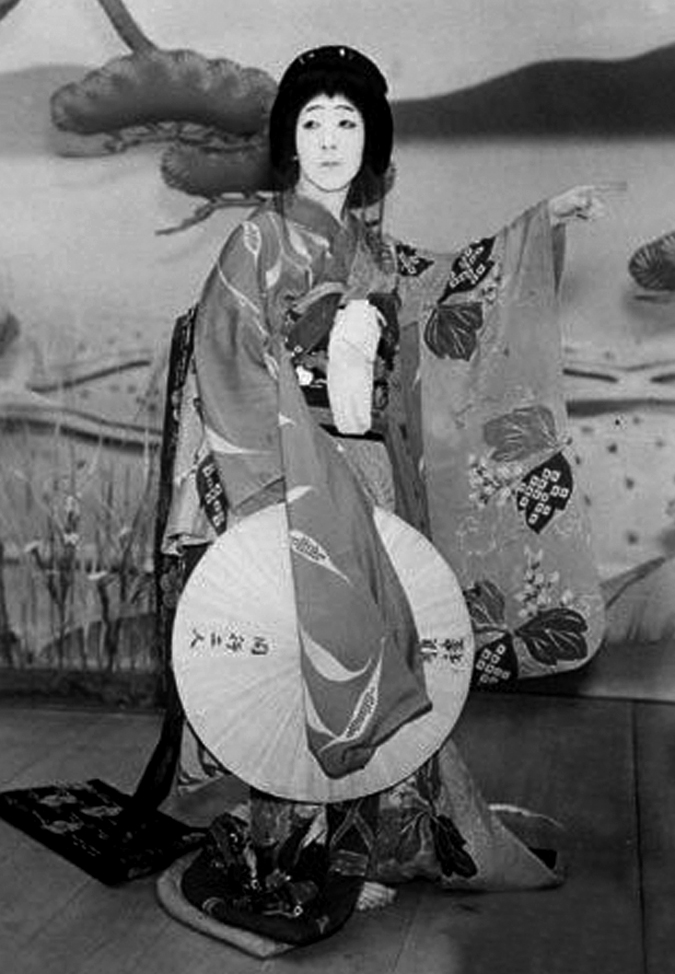
Fukusuke Nakamura VI in the play Onatsu Kyōran

=== Kyōran mono (狂乱物, plays about madness) ===
Inspired by the category of Noh plays about madness, this theme was developed in dance plays from the earliest period of kabuki. Apart from themes of madness in love, another common theme in kyōran mono is madness due to the loss of a child: in the Edo period, a child could be taken away to be sold to circus troupes. In kyōran mono, the central character of the child's mother commonly loses her mind to grief, and becomes a traveling artist who searches for her child, singing and dancing. In Noh, this theme is featured in the plays Sumida Gawa, Sakura Gawa and Miidera.

- Madness among men: Ninin Wankyū, Yasuna
- Madness among women: Onatsu Kyōran, Kurama Jishi, Sumida Gawa, Shizuhata Obi.

=== Michiyuki mono (道行物, lyrical travel plays) ===
Description of the landscape
For a long time in Japanese art there has been a style called michiyuki which describes a journey to a destination. This theme was very popular with the people of the Edo period, as it depicted the freedom of travelling in contrast to the constriction of movement under the shogunate. However, travellers would also be depicted facing melancholy, such as retribution for wrongdoing or attachment to a person met along the journey they must leave. Michiyuki themes are found in the plays Hachidanme (Act VIII of the kabuki play Kanadehon chūshingura), Yoshinoyama (Act IV of the kabuki play Yoshitsune Senbon Zakura), Michiyuki Koi no Odamaki (Act IV of the kabuki play Imoseyama Onna Teikin).
Double love suicide
Since the play Sonezaki Shinjū (double suicide in Sonezaki) by Chikamatsu Monzaemon, the genre of michiyuki has been associated with themes of a double suicide: a couple consider killing each other at the end of their journey. There, character psychology is brought to the fore, and the description of the landscape becomes a background. Later, a new style entered into vogue: a peddler or a street artist intervenes during the couple's journey, remonstrating with them: Ochiudo (Act IV of the kabuki play Kanadehon Chūshingura), Umegawa, Osome.

=== Henge mono (変化物, quick-change plays) ===
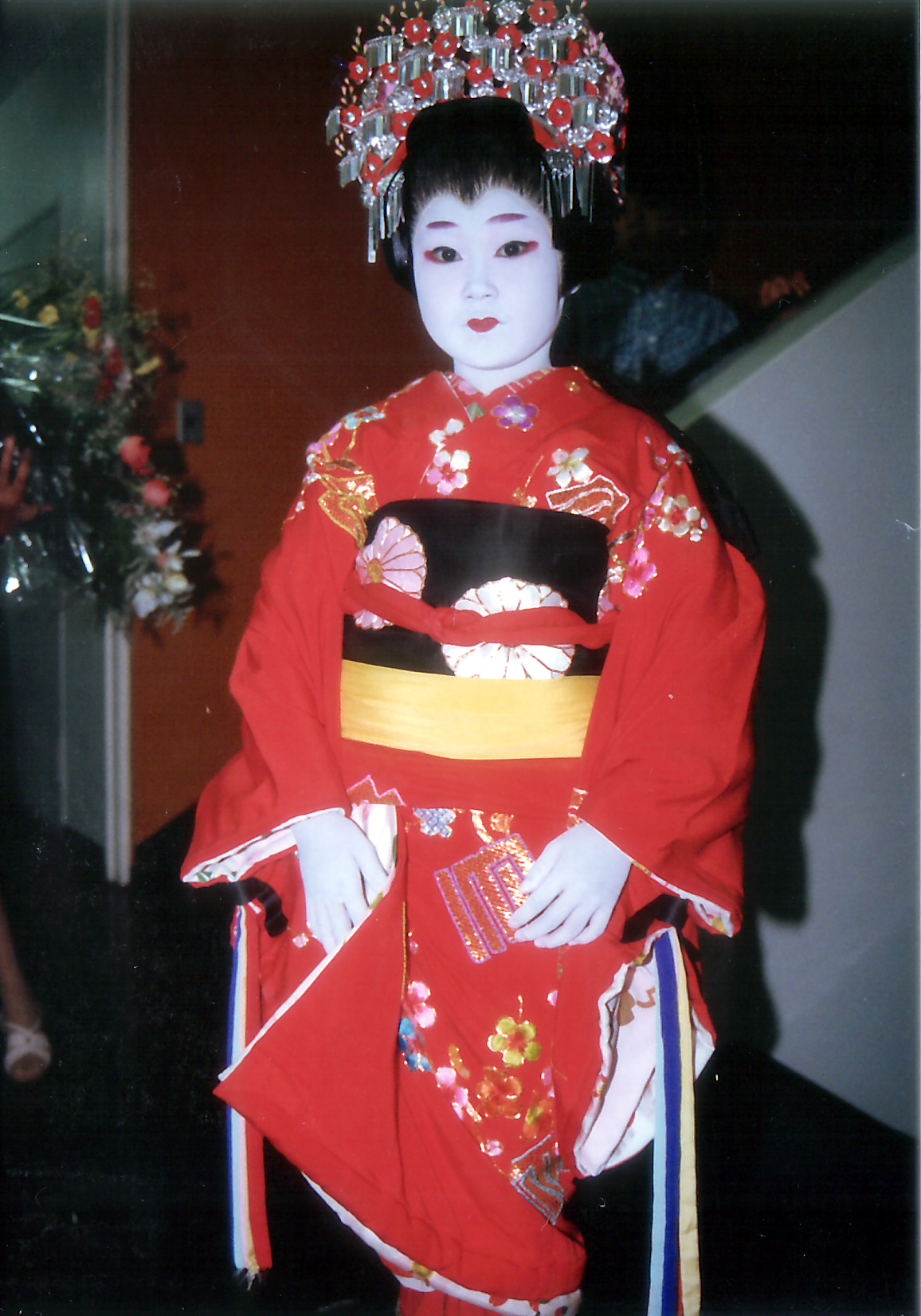
A nihon-buyō dancer in the play Kamuro

In henge mono, the same actor transforms into different characters with a rapid change of costume, and plays between three and twelve (usually seven) characters, one after another – male and female of all ages, from different periods and of all social strata, animals, apparitions, and gods. Henge mono was very popular at the start of the 19th century, particularly with the two great actors Bandō Mitsugorō III and Nakamura Utaemon III, who competed to develop this genre. Today, the genre of henge mono is broken down into several plays, one for each character, which are performed independently, like the famous play Fuji-musume, which was originally the first part of a series of five quick-changes: the girl changes into a blind person (zatō), a celestial deity (tenjin), a servant of the samurai (yakko) and a boatman. Nowadays, many quick-change plays no longer exist in their entirety, with one exception: Rokkasen (six great poets), a play of one performer transforming into 5 poets, for which all 5 quick-changes are still extant and known of.

The most famous henge mono plays are Sagi Musume, Shiokumi, Asazuma Bune, Ame no Gorō, Ukare Bōzu, Mitsumen Komori, Tomo Yakko and Kamuro.

=== Fūzoku mono (風俗物, plays about Edo-period customs) ===
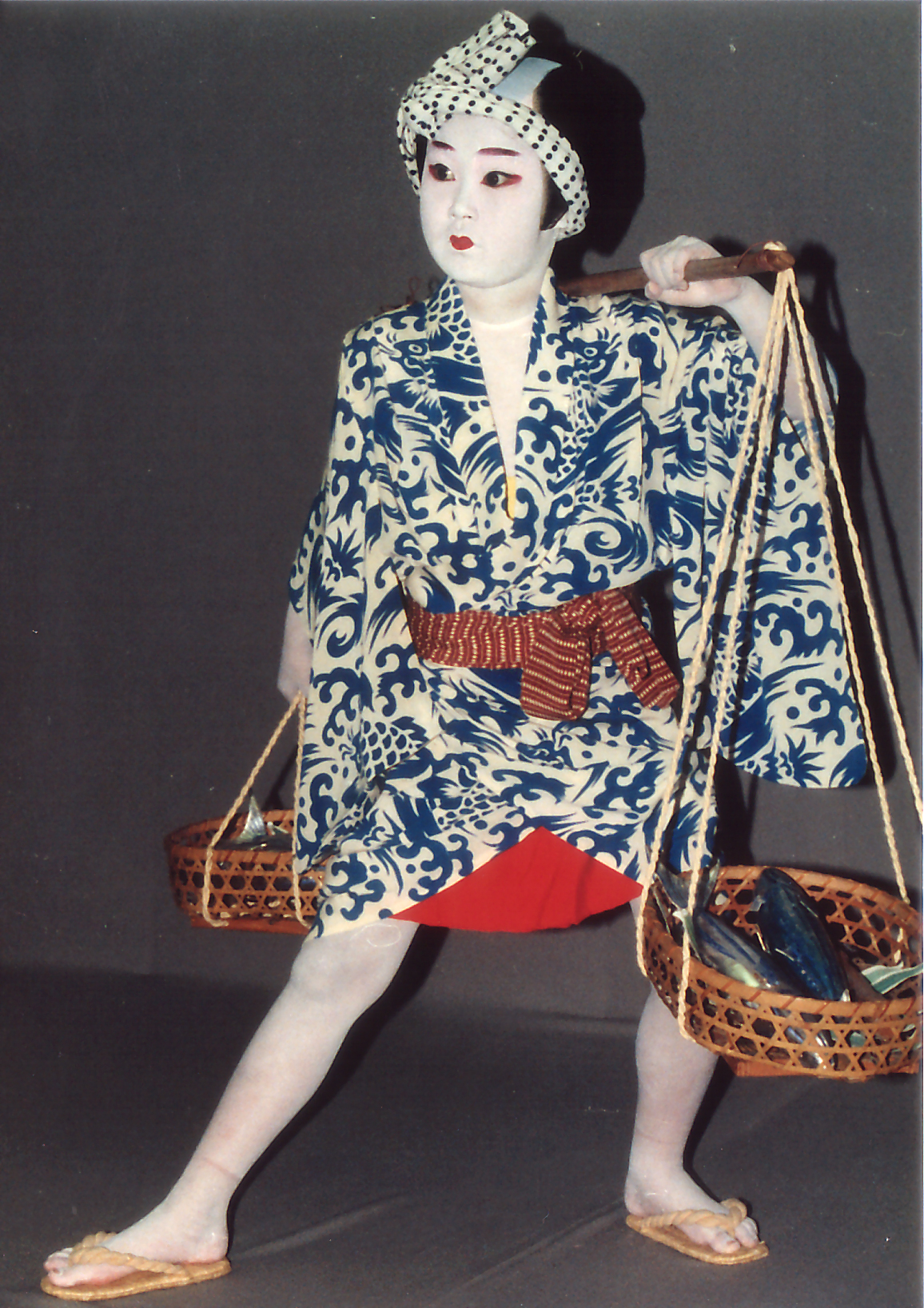
A nihon-buyō dancer in the piece Katsuo-uri

- Traditional festival (matsuri): The pleasure of popular life was undoubtedly the matsuri and many pieces on this theme show the people's passion for this festival: Omatsuri, Sanja-matsuri, Kanda-matsuri, Kioi-jishi, etc.
- Annual events: Musume-nanakusa, Genroku-hanami-odori, Ryūsei, etc.
- Peddler: The variety of occupations among the citizens of Edo was surprising, including a peddler or a street performer, who animated the city of Edo. A peddler was not just a salesman, but was accompanied by various performances or songs, sometimes comical, to attract children, and in some cases with an extravagant costume: Dango-uri, Yoshiwara-suzume, Tamaya, Awamochi, Oharame, Katsuo-uri, etc.
- Street artist: Echigo-jishi, Kairaishi, Dontsuku, Kappore, etc.

=== Matsubame mono (松羽目物, Adaptation of Noh and Kyogen theaters after Meiji period) ===
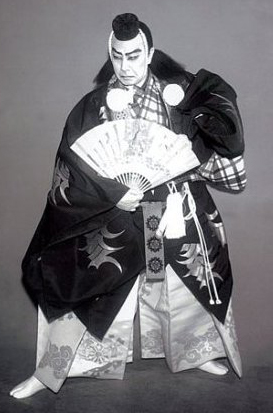
Matsumoto Kōshirō VII in the kabuki-buyō play Kanjinchō

- Noh: In the Edo period, when belonging to the warrior class was distinguished from the kabuki which was an entertainment of the popular classes, the adaptation of Noh in the kabuki dance tended to move away from the original piece by completely changing the context, the characters, and the staging. However, in the Meiji era, when the kabuki tried to renew the popular image by introducing the Noh of a high dress, the adaptation of this medieval theater was made by approaching this noble taste, while keeping the content and style of the original piece: Kanjinchō, Funabenkei, Momijigari, Hagoromo, Hashi-benkei, Mochizuki, Shōjō, etc.
- Kyōgen: Like Noh, kyōgen was adapted in kabuki dance after the Meiji era: Migawari-zazen, Bōshibari, Chatsubo, etc. However, even before this period, there was already an adaptation of kyōgen, such as pieces Tsuri-gitsune, Utsubozaru, Sue-hirogari, etc., but it was transformed into kabuki style.

=== Goshūgi mono (御祝儀物, festive pieces) ===
The goshūgi mono genre, which already existed in the Edo period in the field of music, consists of pieces created to celebrate the founding of a new school, the inheritance of a name or the inauguration of an establishment etc. Also, around the beginning of the Meiji era, musicians broke away from the kabuki world, and school leaders performed new pieces every New Year. These festive pieces, celebrating prosperity and auspiciousness, were given choreography, often in the style of Noh dance: this genre is called goshūgi mono, presented in general in the style called su odori (dance with the kimono or the hakama, without costume): Oimatsu, Hokushū, Shima no senzai, Ume no sakae, Matsu no midori, Tsurukame.

== Schools ==
Japan has about two hundred nihon-buyō schools, including the "five great schools":

1. Hanayagi-ryu (花柳流) founded in 1849 by Hanayagi Jusuke I, who was a disciple of Nishikawa Senzō IV. This is the school with the most disciples.
2. Fujima-ryu (藤間流) founded by Fujima Kanbei Ist during the Hōei era (1704–1711).
3. Wakayanagi-ryu (若柳流) founded in 1893 by Wakayagi Judō I, who was a disciple of Hanayagi Jusuke.
4. Nishikawa-ryu (西川流) founded by Nishikawa Senzō I during the Genroku era (1688–1704). At the origin of many schools, it is the oldest school of nihon-buyō.
5. Bando-ryu (坂東流) founded by Bandō Mitsugorō III, kabuki actor representing the Kasei period (1804–1830).

== Notable people ==
- Masumi Uno (born 1932)

== Bibliography ==
- Fujita, Hiroshi (1976). 日本舞踊入門 [Nihon-buyō nyūmon] (in Japanese). Bunken shuppan. ISBN 4-14-910350-X.
- Hayashi, Yukio (2001). 舞踊名作事典 [Buyō meisaku jiten] (in Japanese). Engeki shuppansha. ISBN 4-900256-13-7.
- Kenkyūkai, Geinōshi (1970). 日本の古典芸能 舞踊 [Nihon no kotengeinō buyō: kinsei no uta to odori] (in Japanese). Engeki shuppansha. ISBN 4-900256-13-7.
- Nihon Hōsō Kyōkai (1999). NHK 日本の伝統芸能 能 狂言 日本舞踊 歌舞伎 文楽 [NHK nihon no dentō geinō: Nō kyōgen nihon buyō kabuki bunraku kanshō nyūmon] (in Japanese). Nihon Hōsō Kyōkai. ISBN 4-14-910350-X.
- Nishikata, Setsuko (1980). 日本舞踊の研究 [Nihon buyō no kenkyū] (in Japanese). Nansōsha. ISBN 4-06-201898-5.
- Nishikata, Setsuko (1988). 日本舞踊の世界 [Nihon-buyō no sekai] (in Japanese). Kodansha. ISBN 4-06-201898-5.
