= Kiyohime =

Japanese folk character

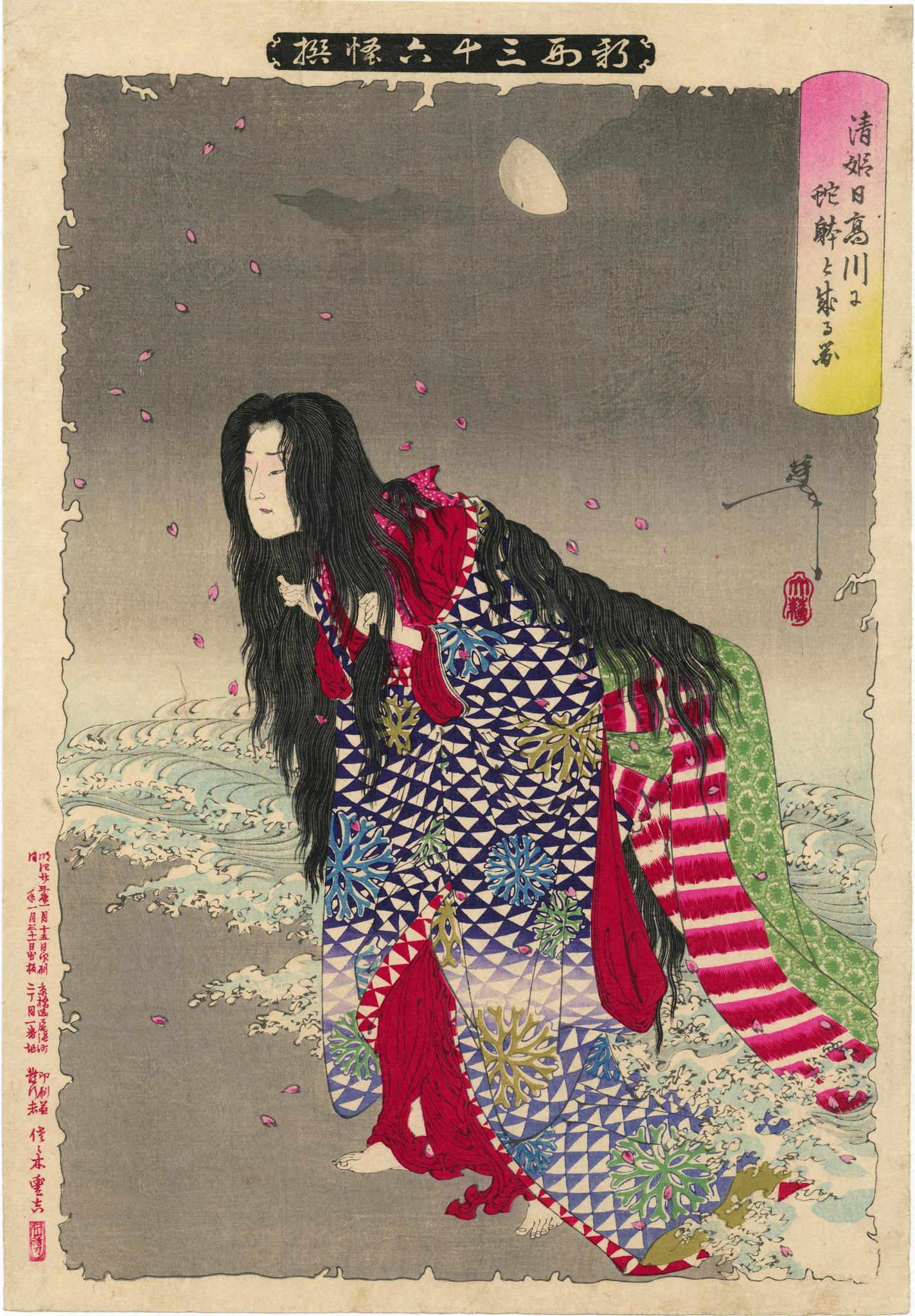
"Kiyohime becomes serpent-bodied at Hidaka River" (1890) Print by Tsukioka Yoshitoshi, Shingata sanjūrokkaisen (『新形三十六怪撰』) "New Forms of Thirty-Six Ghosts"

Kiyohime (清姫) (or just Kiyo) in Japanese folklore is a character in the story of Anchin and Kiyohime, which dates back to the 11th century. In this story, she fell in love with a Buddhist monk named Anchin, but after her interest in the monk was rejected, she chased after him and transformed into a serpent in a rage, before killing him in a bell where he had hidden in the Dōjō-ji temple.

== Overview ==
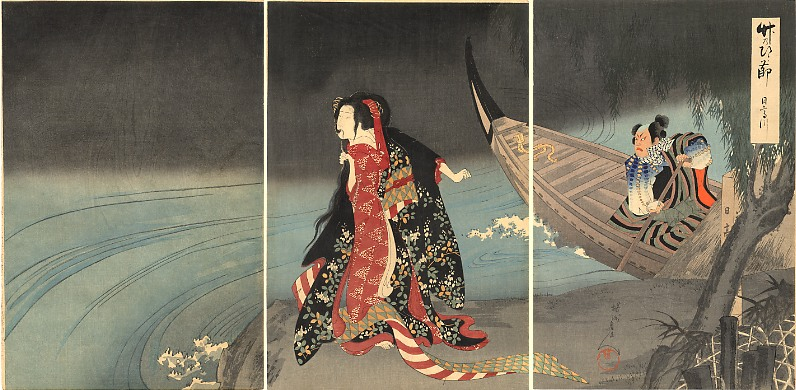
Kiyohime on the banks of Hidaka River

The so-called "Anchin-Kiyohime" legend may be designated by various other names, such as Hidaka River legend (Hidakagawa legend).

The theatrical versions, for which there are numerous playscripts, are collectively known as Dōjōji-mono.

=== Summary ===
The "Anchin-Kiyohime" legend can be summarized as follows: (Note: For brief summaries in English, cf. Leon Zolbrod's footnote who cites Casal (1956); also the translators' anntoation to Toriyama Sekien's woodcut print.)

The legend, connected with the founding of the Dōjō-ji temple in Kii Province (modern-day Wakayama Prefecture), relates how a priest named Anchin from Shirakawa in Ōshū province (present-day Shirakawa, Fukushima) making pilgrimage to the Kumano Shrine in southern Kii, lodged at the home of a shōji (庄司) (steward of a shōen manor) of Manago/Masago (真那古/真砂), where the manor official's daughter Kiyohime fell in love with the young monk.

In order to avoid her, he deceives her (with a false promise to return) and continues his journey. Kiyohime became furious by his rejection and pursued him in rage. At the edge of the Hidaka River, Anchin asked a ferryman to help him to cross the river, but told him not to let her cross with his boat. When Kiyohime saw that Anchin was escaping her, she jumped into the river and started to swim after him. While swimming in the torrent of the Hidaka river, she transformed into a serpent or dragon because of her rage. When Anchin saw her coming after him in her monstrous new form, he ran into the temple called Dōjō-ji. He asked the priests of Dōjō-ji for help and they hid him under the bonshō bell of the temple. However, the serpent smelled him hiding inside the bell and started to coil around it. She banged the bell loudly several times with her tail, then gave a great belch of fire so powerful that it melted the bell and killed Anchin.

=== Variants ===
In some versions, he fell in love with the beautiful Kiyohime, but after a time he overcame his passions and refrained from further meetings, while in other versions Anchin resisted her attention from the start, and avoided her house on his return journey.

Although Hidaka River is perhaps more famed in connection with the legend, and sometimes just the scene of this river has been performed (rather than the entire play), some versions employ the Kirime River (切目川) (which is further east and nearer the beginning of the journey) as the scene of the crossing.

== Textual sources ==
=== Earliest sources ===
The story originally appeared in two collections of setsuwa or tales, Dainihonkoku hokekyō kenki (c. 1040) and Konjaku Monogatarishū (c. 1120).

The text in the former work is written down in kanbun (Chinese text), while the text in the Konjaku Monogatarishū entitled "How a Monk of the Dōjōji in the Province of Kii copied the Lotus Sutra and Brought Salvation to Serpents" is of virtually identical content, only expanded into Japanese.

This old version tells the story of an unnamed young widow (or young unmarried house mistress (Note: It is remarked by Mabuchi et al. that the term kafu (寡婦) here does not necessarily imply widow, as is usually the case in modern Japanese speech.)) who desired the attention of an unnamed handsome monk travelling on a pilgrimage route to a Shugendō shrine in Kumano on the Kii Peninsula. The monk, in an attempt to avoid meeting her, chose a different route on the return journey, and the woman died in grief when she found out that he was deliberately avoiding her. After her death, a great serpent emerged from her bedchamber and it pursued the monk before killing him in a bell in the Dōjō-ji temple where he had hidden.

The old version also ends with an epilogue: Years later the monk appeared in a dream of a senior priest at this temple (Dōjō-ji), begging him to copy a chapter of the Lotus Sutra to release him and the serpent from their suffering in their rebirths, which was duly done and they were both reborn in separate heavens.

=== Names of Anchin and Kiyohime ===
Another setsuwa version is found in Genkō Shakusho c. 1332, and here, Anchin (安珍) is named as the young monk.

The name Kiyohime did not appear in early versions of the tale, but was probably later derived from the name of the father or father-in-law, Seiji, which can also be read as Kiyotsugu. The name Kiyohime did not appear until the 18th century, in the narrative of a joruri (ballad drama) titled Dojo-ji genzai uroko (道成寺現在蛇鱗, The Snake Scales of Dojoji, A Modern Version) that was first performed in 1742.

Some later versions also used different names for Anchin and Kiyohime.

== Picture scroll versions ==
A monogatari version of the story is told in an emaki (picture scroll) from the Muromachi period titled Dōjōji engi emaki ("Illustrated legend of Dōjōji", c. 15th century). In this version, the woman in the tale was the daughter-in-law of the owner of a home in Manago in the Muro district named Steward of Seiji or Shōji Kiyotsugu. Seiji (清次) or Kiyotsugu are variant readings of the same characters, and while "Shōji" is construable as a surname, it is also the title/position of a steward of the shōen manor, as already discussed.

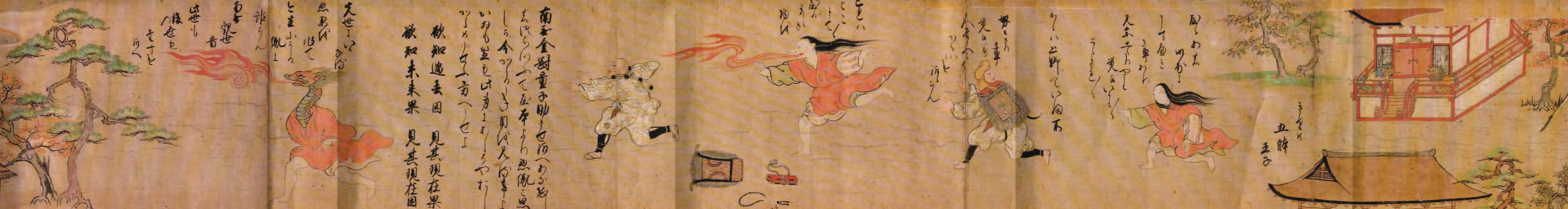
Section of the scroll Dōjōji Engi Emaki illustrating the part where the woman transforms into a serpent chasing after the monk
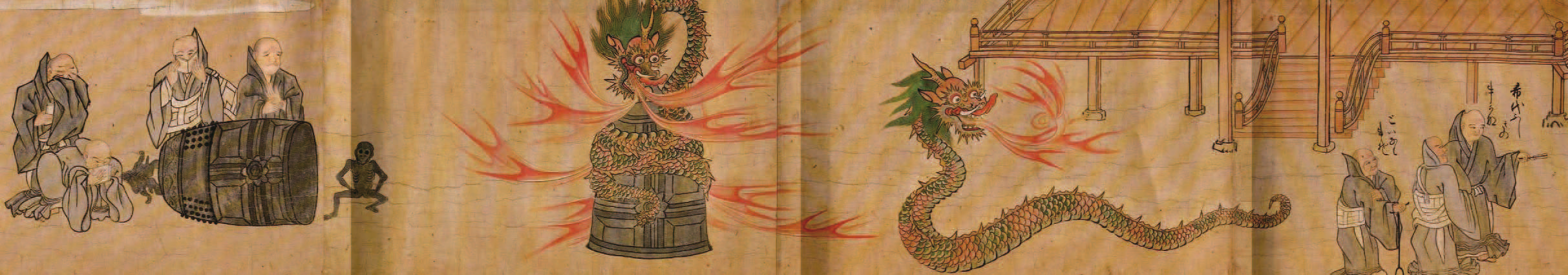
Section of the scroll Dōjōji Engi Emaki illustrating the story where the serpent burns the bell killing the monk

== Cultural references ==
The tale of Anchin and Kiyohime forms the basis of a collection of plays termed Dōjōji mono (Dōjō-ji Temple plays), depicting an event some years after the temple bell was destroyed. These plays include the Noh play Dōjōji and the Kabuki dance drama Musume Dōjōji.
