= Hijiri (Buddhist) =

Caste of Japanese monks

Hijiri (聖, but also written as 仙衆 and 非事吏) were semi-independent wandering Buddhist ascetics (also called shōnin, "holy ones") who lived away from the major Buddhist monasteries, wandered the countryside and preached Buddhism to the people. Their religious authority derived from their itinerant practice, ascetic discipline, and reputation for possessing extraordinary spiritual capacities. The term appears in early Japanese sources with multiple connotations, ranging from “holy person” to “sage,” but by the Heian period it came to designate individuals who withdrew from conventional social structures in pursuit of religious cultivation. They lived in liminal spaces such as sacred mountains, forests, remote shrines, and pilgrimage routes, while simultaneously interacting with lay communities through ritual services, healing, and instruction. Their position between institutional Buddhism, and popular religiosity made them central intermediaries in the diffusion and transformation of Japanese religious culture.

Despite their influence, hijiri occupied an ambiguous position in Japanese society. They were sometimes revered as wonder-workers, healers, or bearers of sacred charisma, but they could also be viewed with suspicion due to their rejection of monastic regulation and their unconventional lifestyles. Literary sources portray them as liminal figures who navigated both worldly and otherworldly realms. Their practices ranged from strict ascetic discipline to ritual healing, exorcism, divination, and the performance of funerary or memorial rites for underserved populations. This diversity contributed to the difficulty of defining the hijiri as a single coherent category.

By the medieval and early modern periods, the institutionalization of Buddhist sects and the increasing regulation of religious activities altered the social role of the hijiri. Some evolved into more organized settled groups associated with Shugendō, Ji-shu or other pilgrimage-based confraternities based around specific temple institutions. The hijiri tradition thus played a vital part in shaping Japanese religiosity and their legacy survives in folklore, religious narratives, and the ongoing importance of mountains and itinerant practice in modern Japanese religion.

== Types of hijiri ==
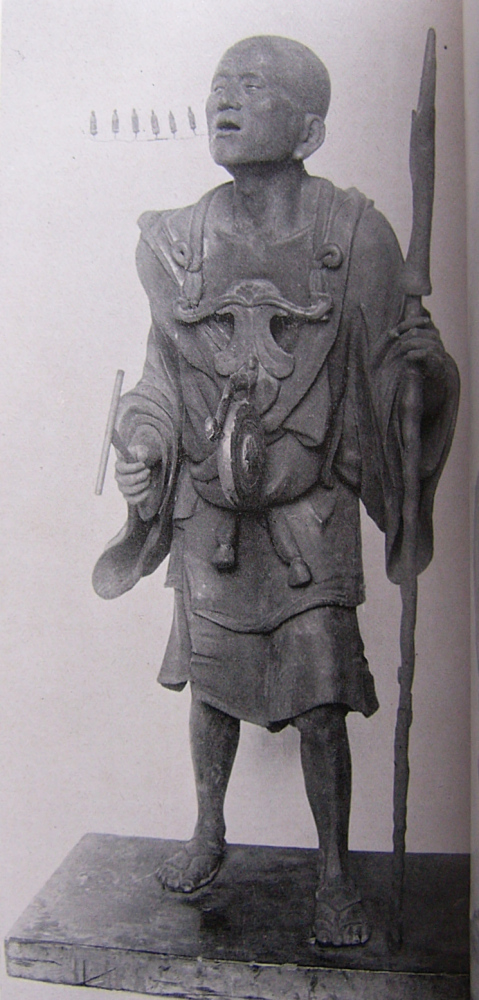
Statue of Kūya by Kōshō, son of Unkei (c. 13th century). The six syllables of the nembutsu, are represented literally by six small Amida figures.

The origins of the hijiri are complex and predate the full establishment of Buddhist monastic institutions. Early forms of mountain asceticism, shamanistic practices, and the presence of reclusive holy figures at sacred sites laid the groundwork for their emergence. With the introduction of Buddhism to Japan, Buddhist monks and recluses began to blend imported forms of ascetic training with indigenous religious conceptions of sacred power. By the Nara and Heian periods, the hijiri were associated with mountain cults, pilgrimage circuits, and the performance of austerities (gyō) that were believed to grant access to supernatural power. Their reputation was strengthened by legends in which they mediated between humans, deities, and local spirits.

=== Nembutsu Hijiri ===
During the Heian and Kamakura periods, hijiri played a significant role in the spread of Buddhism to rural communities, especially the emerging Pure Land movement focused on the nembutsu. Gyōki (668–749) was one of the earliest well known hijiris. He was a self-ordained monk who traveled the countryside teaching Buddhism and performing social work.

Later figures such as Kūya (903–972), perhaps the most famous of all nembutsu hijiri, became emblematic of this trend, combining itinerant preaching with ritual performances intended to promote salvation through Amitābha. Other hijiri cultivated ties with various temples, including Tendai temples around Mount Hiei, Jōdo-shū temples like Zenkōji and Jōdo Shinshū temples while maintaining autonomy from the formal hierarchy.

Another influential nembutsu hijiri was Ippen Shōnin (1234–1289). Ippen's Ji-shū movement became a major medieval current, emerging from his early training in the Seizan branch of Jōdo-shū and his subsequent encounters with Shingon- and Tendai-affiliated hijiri. Ippen's traveled more than fifteen hundred miles proclaiming that single-minded recitation of the nembutsu unites the practitioner, in the very moment of utterance, with the Buddha’s timeless enlightenment. His ministry combined nembutsu devotion with ecstatic dancing and the distribution of Amida-inscribed talismans. Ippen inspired a popular movement that crossed social boundaries; his life and work are chiefly known through the illustrated narrative scrolls of the Ippen Hijiri-e.

=== Kōya Hijiri ===
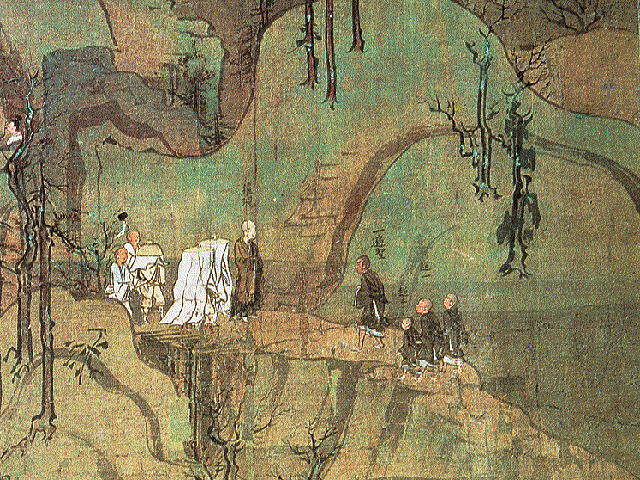
An illustration showing Ippen meeting with Kōya Hijiri at Mount Kōya

Kōya Hijiri (高野聖) were Japanese monks from Mount Kōya who were sent to preach Buddhism around the country. They were the lowest caste inside the priests' hierarchy of the Mount Kōya temples, and traveled while peddling for a living. They give title to famed writer Izumi Kyōka's most representative short-story.

Despite officially belonging to the Shingon Koyasan sect, the Kōya Hijiri primarily practiced and preached the Pure Land practice of nembutsu, merging Pure Land Buddhism with devotion to Kukai. In the Kamakura Period, many Kōya Hijiri came to belong to the Ji-Shu sect founded by Ippen. Later, in the Tokugawa Period, these Ji-Shu Hijiri on Koyasan were officially folded into the Shingon sect. This led to friction, and eventually outright conflict, which was only ended by governmental action in the 17th century, causing many Hijiri to be expelled from the mountain and their temples destroyed.

Former monks who turned to mischief were called yadōkai. Moreover, kōya hijiri also eventually became a seasonal word (in the context of poetry) for turtles.

=== Hōkke hijiri ===
The "Lotus holy ones" (Hōkke hijiri or jikyōja) were hijiri devoted to the Lotus Sutra, also known as Lotus Sūtra devotees (jikyōsha). They were known for their chanting and recitation of the Lotus Sutra and the daimoku. Many were mountain ascetics, or recluses (tonsei) who practiced away from large established temples. Their practice centered around the simple recitation, listening or reading of the Lotus Sūtra in solitude. Hōkke hijiri also engaged in esoteric practices. These figures feature prominently in the Hōkke Genki, a collection of Lotus Sūtra stories and miracles by the priest Chingen, which sees the Hōkke hijiri as being superior to aristocrats or traditional monks.

== See also ==
- Hijiri zaka
