= Masumi Uno =

Japanese watercolor painter

- 宇野 満寿美
- Born: 1932 (age 93–94)

Masumi Uno (宇野 満寿美, Uno Masumi; born 1932) is a Japanese watercolor painter and writer. He is a member of the Japan Artists Association.

== Works ==
Uno trained as a Nihon Buyō dancer, from which she often borrows stories for her paintings. Her paintings depict animals (mostly foxes) which are frequent characters in classical Japanese stories.

=== Books ===
- 狐三昧. Biken International, 2004. ISBN 4-434-05247-0
