= Dōjōji (Noh play) =

Japanese play

道成寺
- Category: 4th — miscellaneous
- Characters: Supporting: Abbot of Dōjōji; Supporting actor assistants: two Buddhist priests Interlude: two servants Protagonist (intro): dancer Protagonist (return): demon
- Place: Dōjō-ji, Kii province
- Time: Third month
- Sources: Hokke Genki; Kanemaki program

Dōjōji (道成寺) is a famous Noh play of the fourth category ("miscellaneous"), of unknown authorship. Traditionally, it is said Kan'ami wrote it and Zeami Motokiyo revised it, while others assign it to Kanze Nobumitsu; there are many variations in different texts, and a popular adaptation for kabuki theatre is titled Musume Dōjōji. It originated from a longer 15th century play called Kanemaki ("Enwrapped in a Bell"). It is set in Dōjō-ji, a Buddhist temple of the Tendai sect in Kii Province, telling the story of a vengeful hannya demon and a temple bell. It is practically the only Noh play to use a substantial prop: a huge bell.

== Plot ==
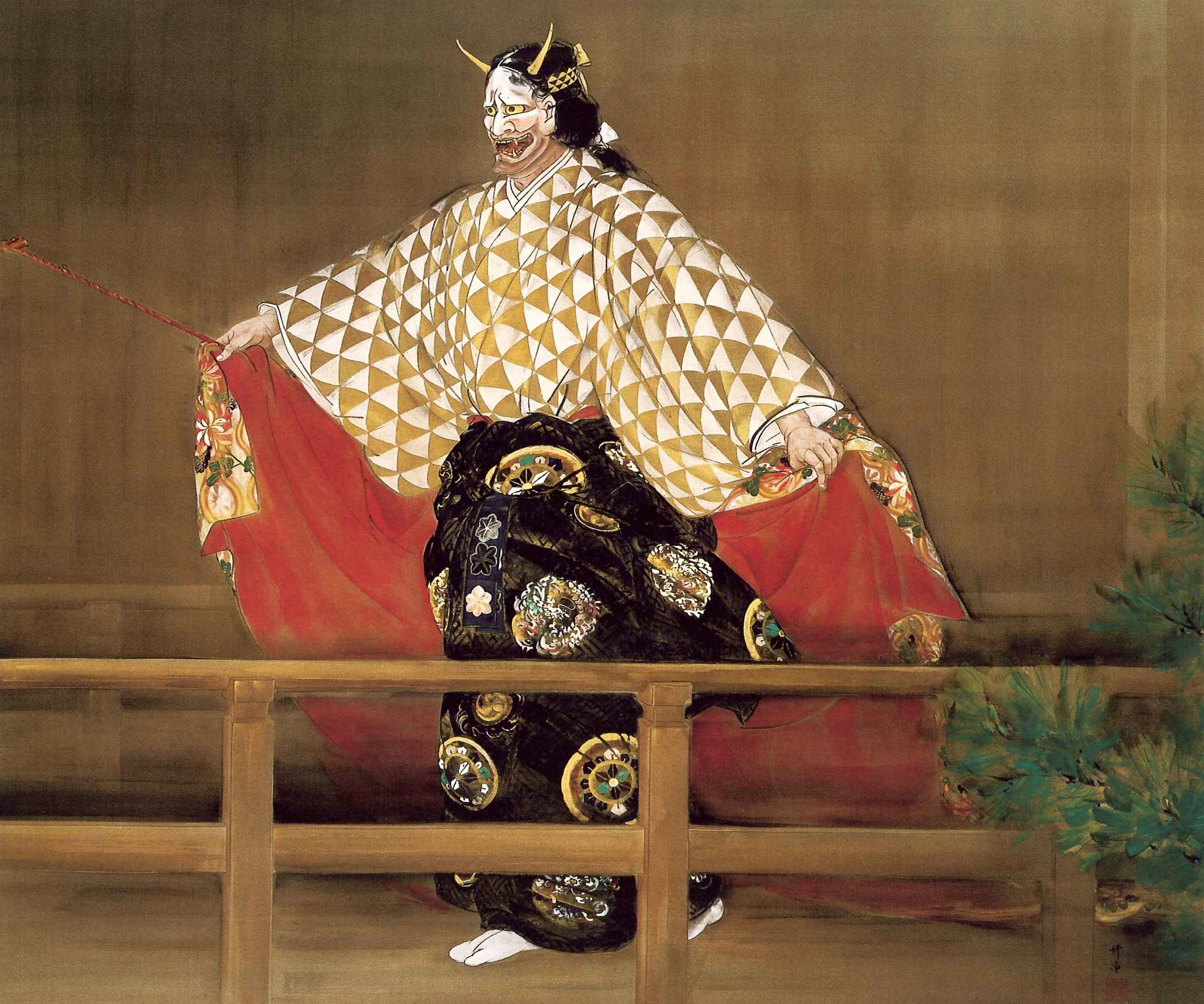
Painting of a Dōjōji performance by Kōgyo Tsukioka

Dōjō-ji in Kii has had no bonshō (large temple bell) for many years. Today is an auspicious day: the Abbot has arranged for a new bell to be raised into the belfry. With a great deal of effort, the temple servants succeed in hoisting it into position.

For reasons the Abbot will not explain, the dedication service requires the absence of all women from the temple grounds. But a female dancer approaches the gate and, by giving an impromptu performance, persuades the servant to admit her. Continuing to dance before the hypnotized onlookers, she slowly approaches the bell, then starts to strike it viciously. She stands under the bell and jumps; the bell simultaneously falls to the ground with a tremendous crash.

The servants rouse themselves as though from a trance and see that the bell is on the ground. Only with difficulty do they remember what happened. They go to tell the Abbot, who comes in great haste. He scolds the servants and tells them the story of what happened to the previous bell. Many years before, a monk named Anchin from the northern provinces would make an annual trip to Kumano Sanzan shrine complex, stopping at the house of a steward each time. He would bring gifts for the steward's daughter, Kiyohime. She had a crush on the priest, and the steward once told her, as a joke, that when she grew up, she would be his wife.

Not realizing it was a joke, she finally confronted the priest a year later and demanded his hand in marriage. When he saw that she would not take no for an answer, he snuck out of the steward's house, crossed a swollen river to Dōjō-ji, and asked them to hide him, which they did under the bell. The girl ran after him, but could not cross the river. In her towering rage, she transformed into a woroti (demonic serpent) and swam to the temple. She coiled herself around the bell, which turned white-hot and burnt him to death inside.

On hearing this, the servants resolve to perform an exorcism of her vengeful spirit. They pray to the five Five Wisdom Kings of the East, South, West, North, and Centre. Then they chant part of the Vow of Acala. With great difficulty, they lift the bell, and the demon jumps out from beneath it. The priests pronounce invocations to three of the five Dragon Kings. Using prayer and brandishing their rosaries, they succeed in driving the monstrous serpent away. She leaps into the River Hidaka and vanishes beneath the waves.

== Sources ==
The earliest known version of this story is in Hokke Genki (c. 1040), a collection of Buddhist miracle stories citing the Lotus Sutra. Dōjōji is thought to be derived from a more substantial play called Kanemaki, which is still occasionally performed.

== Location ==
The temple Dōjō-ji is located in the town of Hidakagawa, Wakayama Prefecture.

== Bell ==
Due to the bell in this play, dedicated Noh stages have a hook used for holding this bell in the center of the roof, and a metal loop at upstage left to hold the rope when lowering it; these are used only for this play. The part calls for a change of Noh costumes inside the bell, which is very challenging, due to being done alone, in the dark, in cramped quarters – normally a Noh costume is put on by several attendants. Accordingly, this role is reserved for senior actors.

The bell is very heavy and, if lowered improperly, can hurt the actor, thus requiring that the attendant lowering the bell be in sync with the performer. The actor inside the prop rings a little bell to signal that the costume change has been successful, and that he is ready to perform the second act.

== See also ==
- Dōjō-ji
- Kiyohime
