= Shosagoto =

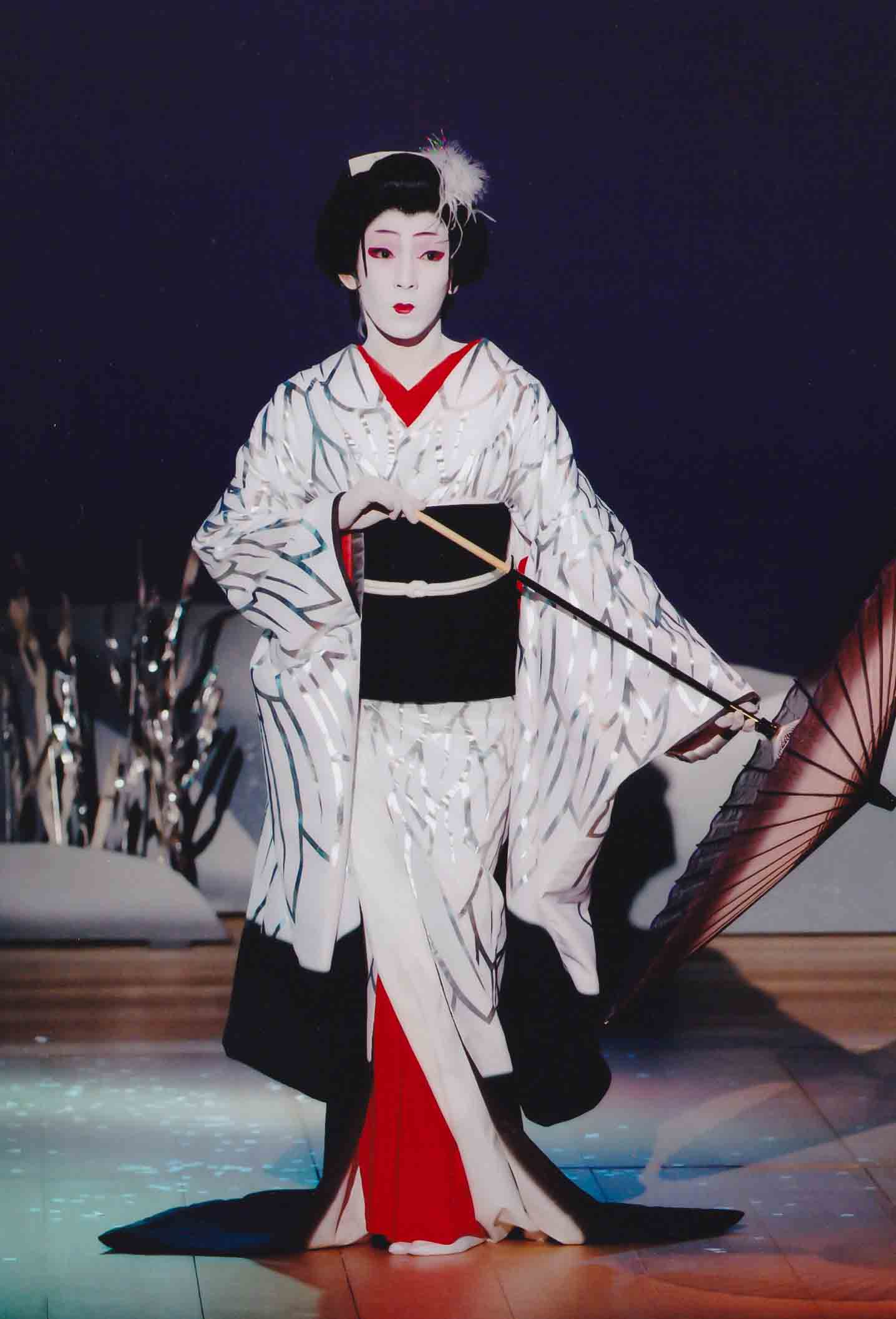
Onnagata actor Akifusa Guraku performing Sagi Musume (The Heron Maiden)

Shosagoto (所作事) or furigoto (振事), also known as dance or dance-drama, is a type of kabuki play based on dance. It is one of the three genres of kabuki, together with jidaimono (historical plays) and sewamono (contemporary plays).

A central element of kabuki since its origin in 1603, shosagoto plays became an important part of the kabuki repertoire towards the end of the 17th century, and still forms a key part of the kabuki repertoire today. For example, the January 2018 program at the Kabuki-za in Tokyo included three shosagoto performances.

There are several types of kabuki dances. An important difference is between the mainly non-narrative dances with nagauta accompaniment (such as Fuji Musume), and the more dramatic ones, with complex storylines and characters (such as Kanjinchō). The nagauta musicians are often seated in rows on stepped platforms behind the dancers. There are many other distinctions and styles. For example, matsubame mono dances include particularly theatricalized sets and costumes, often including quick on-stage changes of clothes (called hikinuki). Hengemono dances involve a single actor playing different roles.

== History ==
From the very origin of kabuki in 1603, when Izumo no Okuni began performing in the dry riverbeds of Kyoto - a style referred to as okuni kabuki - dance has been a central element of kabuki, and in fact those first performances involved more dance and music than drama.

An important early development of dance in kabuki was the incorporation of elements from keigoto, bunraku dance scenes. However, proper shosagoto dances, performed by onnagata (lit. "female role") actors, entered the kabuki repertoire in the Genroku period (1688-1704) (see also Genroku bunka). The form was further developed from the Kyoho to the Horeki period (1716–1764), and nagauta became the main form of accompaniment.

The first actor to perfect the genre was Segawa Kikunojo I (c. 1693–1749), considered an excellent dancer and the best onnagata in Edo during the first half of the 18th century. He became very successful shortly after arriving to the city in 1730 by performing the leading role on the dance Aioi Jishi at the Nakamura-za. He specialized in the performance of Shakkyomono (such as Aioi jishi) and Dojojimono dances. Some other important dance roles he performed in those early years were Sayo no Nakayama Asama-ga-Dake (1736), Mugen no Kane (1739), Hanabusa Shishi no Rangyoku and Makura Jishi (1742), and Mugen no Kane Omoi no Akatsuki (1746).

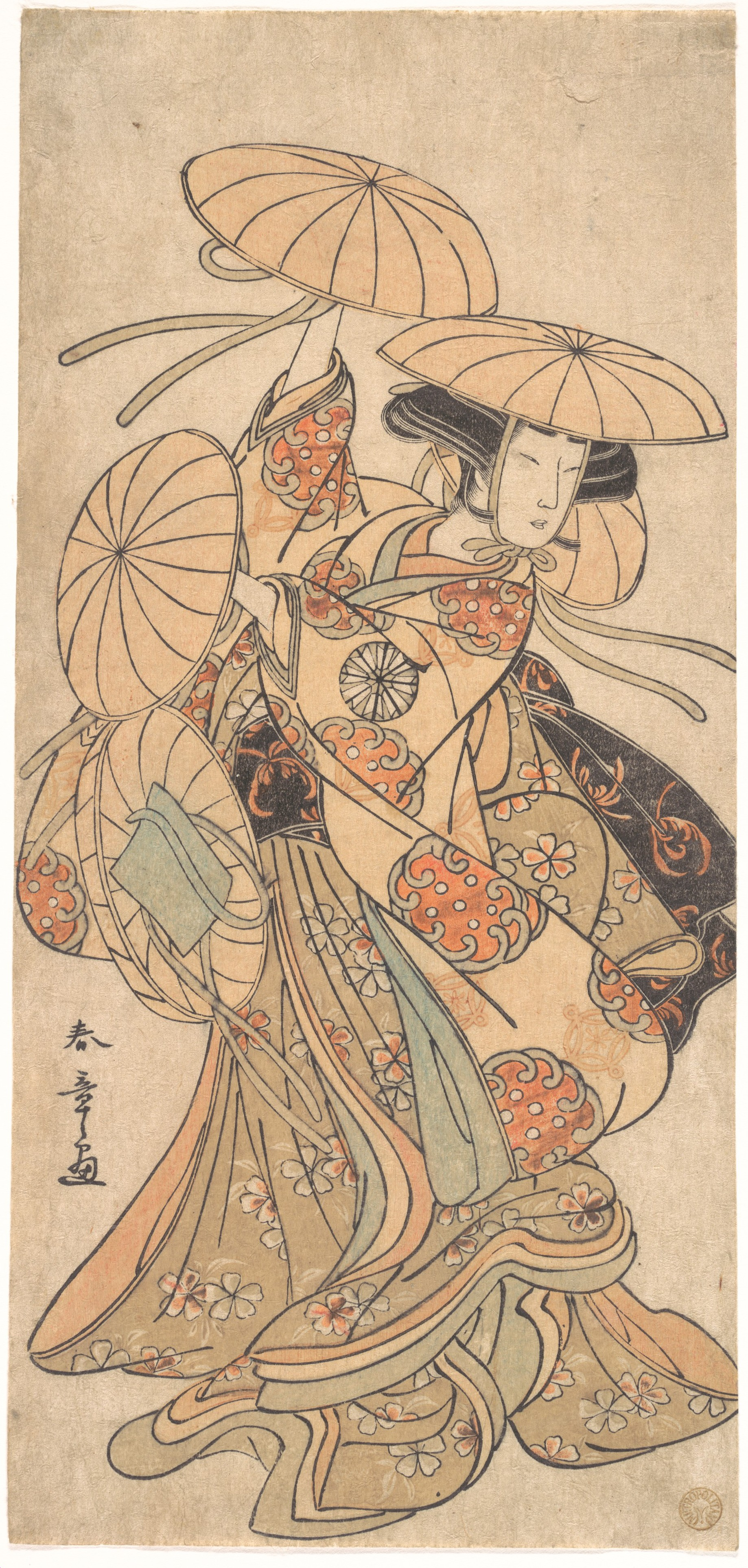
Nakamura Tomijūrō I performing Musume Dōjōji

Another important actor in the early development of onnagata shosagoto was Nakamura Tomijuro I (1719–1786), also said to have perfected kabuki dance. A native of Osaka, he achieved great success early in his career with performances of a Shakkyomono dance, particularly in Edo at the Nakamura-za in 1741 and then again in 1748. His greatest accomplishment was his performance of the main role in the debut of one of the most famous kabuki dances, Musume Dojoji, in 1753, again at the Nakamura-za. The performance was so successful that it was staged for several months, and Tomijuro became one of the most famous actors in Edo.
