= Fuji Musume =

Kabuki play

Fuji Musume 藤娘
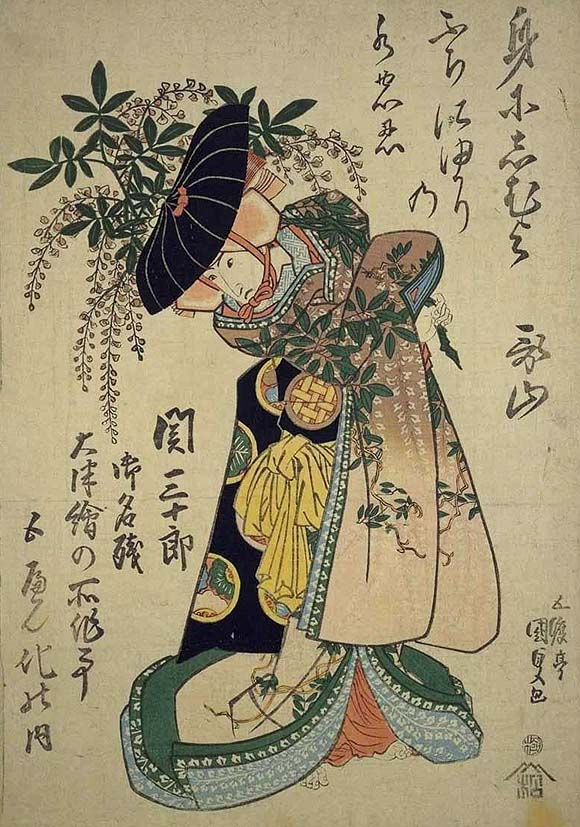
- Seki Sanjuro II playing the Wisteria Maiden at the Nakamura-za, print by Utagawa Kunisada c. 1826
- Written by: Tsuuchi Hanjuro; Yasuda Abun; Nakata Mansuke
- Characters: Wisteria Maiden
- Original language: Japanese
- Genre: shosagoto

Premiere
- Date premiered: 1826
- Place premiered: Nakamura-za, Edo

Fuji Musume (藤娘, The Wisteria Maiden) is a kabuki dance with lyrics written by Katsui Genpachi, choreography by Fujima Taisuke and music by Kineya Rokusaburô IV, first performed in 1826.

Originally part of a set of five different dances performed as a sequence, Fuji Musume is the only one that has survived. The first time these dances were staged in 1826 at the Nakamura-za in Edo, actor Seki Sanjuro II performed all of them as part of his farewell performance.

One of many revisions to the play, playwright Oka Onitaro and actor Onoe Kikugoro VI created a new, more supernatural version of the dance, staged for the first time in March 1937 at the Kabuki-za. In this version, the maiden becomes the spirit of the wisteria. The next year, performances of the dance by Onoe Baiko VII at the Minami-za in Kyoto and at the Kabuki-za in Tokyo, helped popularized the dance.

Fuji Musume remains a popular and famous dance in the kabuki repertoire.

== Characters ==
The titular Wisteria Maiden is the only character seen in the play, and is accompanied by a nagauta musical ensemble of singers, shamisen, drums, flute and small gongs.

== Plot ==
Fuji Musume is the visual climax of a Kabuki show, in which the dancer performing the role of the Wisteria Maiden changes kimonos four times and dances against a gorgeous backdrop of clusters of mauve and purple wisteria flowers. There is no story to speak of; the pleasure of the dance comes from the fast changes of costume which are performed on stage behind the trunk of a tree and the charming and winsome glances of the maiden as she expresses sentiments of love.

== Translation ==
The play was translated into English by Leonard C. Pronko in Kabuki Plays on Stage III: Darkness and Desire, 1804-1864, edited by James R. Brandon and Samuel L. Leiter and published in 2002.

- Kabuki Plays on Stage III: Kabuki Plays on Stage III: Darkness and Desire, 1804-1864. (2002) University of Hawaii Press, ISBN 978-0824824556.
