= Hokke Genki =

Dainihonkoku Hokekyō Kenki (大日本国法華経験記, "Miraculous Tales of the Lotus Sutra from Japan"), also called Honchô Hokke Genki (本朝法華験記) but commonly referred to as Hokke Genki (法華験記), is an 11th century Japanese collection of Buddhist tales and folklore (setsuwa). It was compiled by the monk Chingen (鎮源) from 1040 to 1043, and consists of three volumes with 129 chapters, two of which are missing. The collection is intended to promote the Lotus Sutra with tales of miraculous events linked to the sutra.

== Origin ==
In the introduction to the book, Chingen referred to a now-lost collection of tales by the Chinese monk Yiji (義寂) titled Fahua yanji (法華験記), which may be the inspiration for this collection. Some scholars suggest that text referred to may be by a Korean monk with the same name in Chinese Ŭijŏk (義寂), although Chingen may have consulted both the Chinese and Korean collections. The tales he collected, however, are Japanese only, which Chingen noted in the preface are meant for ordinary people rather than priests and scholars. Hokke Genki incorporates stories and biographies from other works, such as Nihon Ōjō Gokuraku-ki (日本徃生極樂記), Sanbō Ekotoba (三宝絵詞) and Nihon Ryōiki, but also include tales not found in earlier works.

== Content ==
Chingen organised his tales roughly chronologically, beginning from the time of Prince Shōtoku. The tales are found in chapters that are based on the seven groups of the Buddhist order; these are bodhisattvas, monks, male novices, nuns, laymen and laywomen, and animals and other non-human entities.

The collection contains setsuwa tales or biographical stories of advocates and devotees (jikyōsha, 持経者) of the Lotus Sutra, many of them from the Heian period (794 to 1331). Most of them (over 90 out of 127) feature in some way hijiri or holy men (聖) who lived in the mountains. 31 of the tales involve laymen and warriors. In this collection, the worship of Japanese gods and Buddha is given in syncretic manner, and some Japanese deities appear as bodhisattvas. There are two general categories of setsuwa. The first describes the activities of the devotees and their observances of the precepts of the Lotus Sutra. The second involves miraculous tales that illustrate the power of the Lotus Sutra. A notable example of the folktales in the collection is the first appearance of the story of Anchin and Kiyohime, although neither were specifically named in the story.

The fundamental aim of these stories are doctrinal and soteriological: by recording instances of karmic response, Chingen seeks to show that devotion to the Lotus unfailingly produces benefits in this life and the next. The text thus functions as an applied exposition of the Tendai Lotus teaching, presenting narrative evidence for claims already established in scriptural and doctrinal discourse. The work emphasizes exemplary individuals who uphold the Lotus Sūtra through recitation, copying, veneration, teaching, or ritual practice. Since these figures range across social strata, their activities underscore the universal accessibility of the Lotus path. Chingen emphasizes that neither scholarly mastery nor ascetic rigor is a prerequisite; sincere engagement with the sūtra, even in limited forms, is sufficient to elicit karmic response.

A central theme of the Hokke genki is the principle of karmic recompense operating visibly within the human world. Many accounts depict immediate rewards such as healing from illness, protection from calamity, longevity, or social prosperity. Others portray postmortem outcomes, including auspicious dreams, visions of buddhas or bodhisattvas, and favorable rebirths. Through these narratives, Chingen presents the Lotus Sūtra as an active, responsive force, capable of intervening directly in the world and in people's daily lives.

Equally important is the negative contrast provided by stories of neglect, slander, or disrespect toward the Lotus. Such cases often result in misfortune, suffering, or ominous signs, reinforcing the doctrinal claim that the Lotus Sūtra occupies a uniquely authoritative position among Buddhist teachings. These cautionary tales serve a didactic function, delineating correct and incorrect orientations toward the Dharma and warning readers of the karmic consequences of error.

The Hokke genki reflects broader Heian-period concerns regarding the decline of the Dharma and the accessibility of liberation in a morally compromised age. By grounding lofty Tendai doctrine in concrete narratives and practices like recitation of the Lotus Sutra, Chingen bridges elite scholastic Buddhism and popular religious sensibilities. The text thus operates simultaneously as edification, exhortation, and proof. It affirms the continued potency of the Lotus Sūtra and encourages its propagation as a reliable means of salvation amid the perceived religious degeneration of the latter age (mappo).

== Translation ==
The collection has been translated into English by Yoshiko K. Dykstra and published as Miraculous Tales of the Lotus Sutra from Ancient Japan: The Dainihonkoku Hokekyokenki of Priest Chingen.
