= Dōjō-ji =

Tendai Buddhist temple in Hidakagawa, Japan

- 道成寺
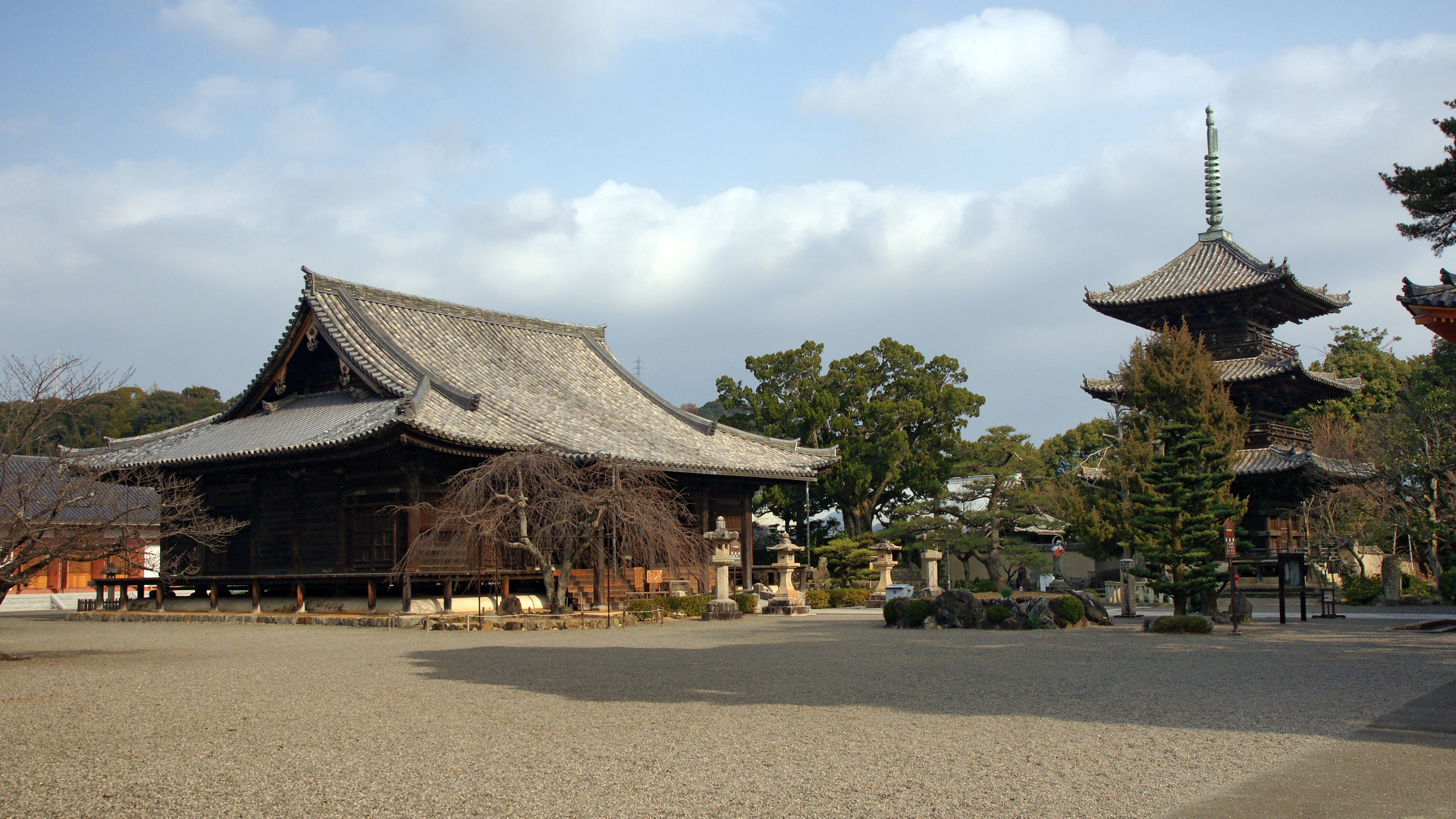
- Hondō (1357) and Three-storey pagoda (1763)

- Location within Wakayama Prefecture Location within Japan

Religion
- Affiliation: Tendai
- Deity: Senjū Kannon
- Status: functional

Location
- Location: 1738 Kanemaki, Hidakagawa, Wakayama Prefecture
- Country: Japan
- Interactive map of Dōjō-ji
- Coordinates: 33°54′52″N 135°10′28″E

Architecture
- Founder: c.Emperor Monmu
- Completed: 701

Website
- www.dojoji.com

Dōjō-ji (道成寺) is a Tendai school Buddhist temple in the town of Hidakagawa, Wakayama Prefecture, Japan. Founded in the Nara period, it has given its name to a number of plays, most notably the Noh drama Dōjōji. The temple has numerous statues which are designated National Treasures, or Important Cultural Properties, as well as several structures with the Important Cultural Property designation. The precincts of the temple were designated a National Historic Site in 2013.

== History ==
Although the foundation of the temple is not completely documented, it claims to have been founded in 701 AD at the request of Emperor Monmu, with the monk Gien (643-728) as its founder. According to folklore, Emperor Monmu acted on behalf of his wife, Fujiwara no Miyako, the mother of Emperor Shōmu. According to this legend, Fujiwara no Miyako was born to a family of ama fishermen in what is now the city of Gobō, Wakayama. Her parents were without children for many years but in response to fervent prayers to Hachiman, were gifted with a daughter; however the daughter was born completely bald. The village suffered from poor fishing, which they attributed to a mysterious light which had appeared at the bottom of the bay. Fujiwara no Miyako's mother, thinking that her daughter's affliction was due to some sins of a previous life, jumped into the water, intending to sacrifice herself to save the village. However, at the bottom of the bay she saw that the mysterious light was coming from a golden statue of Kannon Bosatsu, which she brought back to the surface. Afterwards, fishing returned to normal, and in a dream, Kannon appeared to her, and she asked for her daughters affliction to be cured. Soon afterwards, Fujiwara no Miyako grew thick strands of beautiful black hair. One day, as she was brushing her hair, a sparrow (or swallow) flew in, picked up some stray strands of hair and which it used to build a nest in the eaves of the mansion of Fujiwara no Fuhito, a powerful political figure in the imperial administration. On finding the long, beautiful hair, he sought out the owner, a welcomed Fujiwara no Miyako as his adopted daughter. She later caught the eye of the prince who would later become Emperor Monmu. However, as empress, she could not forget her hometown in Kii Province and especially the statue of Kannon Bosatsu which she left behind, so she petitioned her husband to have a temple built. This legend was told in the Heian period Dōjō-ji Miyako-hime Denki (宮子姫傳記) and was subsequently re-told with many variations into the Edo period.

While the legend remains folklore, archaeological excavations have found traces of the layout of the original temple, and roof tiles to the early 8th century. Several excavations have been conducted since 1978 and the foundations of the Nara period Main Hall, Pagoda, Middle Gate, Lecture Hall, and Cloister have been found. The cloister extended from the left and right sides of the Middle Gate and surrounded the site in a rectangular shape to the left and right sides of the Lecture Hall. Within the courtyard, the pagoda was to the east and the Main Hall was to the west. A Senjū Kannon statue was discovered during the dismantling and reconstruction of the Main Hall of the temple in 1985 and was found to be a Nara period work.

Most of the surviving Buddhist statues at the temple date from the early to mid-Heian period, which appears to be the peak of the temple's property. The existing Main Hall was completed in 1357. The temple went into decline from the Muromachi period and was largely burned down during Toyotomi Hideyoshi's conquest of Kii Province in 1585 (during which time the temple bell was looted). In 1655, the Main Hall was repaired by Tokugawa Yorinobu, the daimyō of Kishū Domain, and during the Edo period, structures such as a Niomon and a Three-story Pagoda were restored.

== Cultural Properties ==
=== Buildings ===
- Hondō (1357); 7x5 bay, single-storey, irimoya-zukuri, tiled roof; (Important Cultural Property)
- Niōmon (1694); 3 bay, single-door rōmon, irimoya-zukuri, tiled roof; (Important Cultural Property)
- Three-storey pagoda (1763) (Prefecturally-designated Cultural Property)
- Shoin (1702) (Prefecturally-designated Cultural Property)

=== Statuary ===
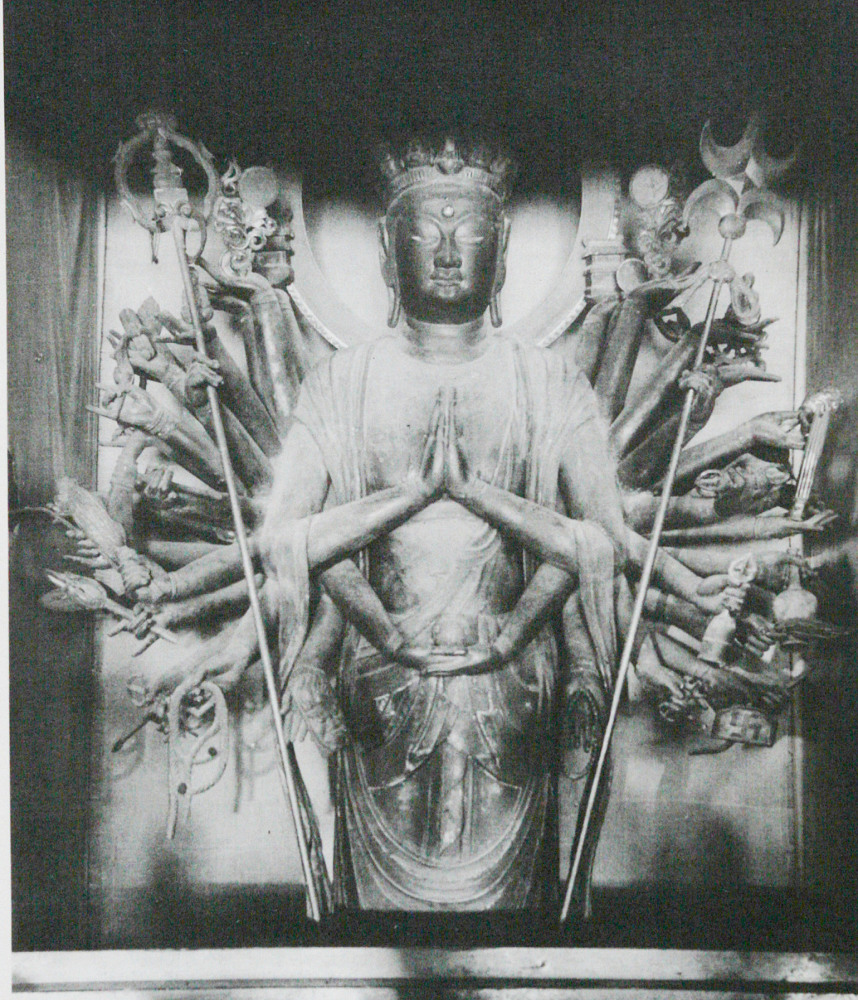
Wooden statue of Senjū Kannon (Heian period) (National Treasure)

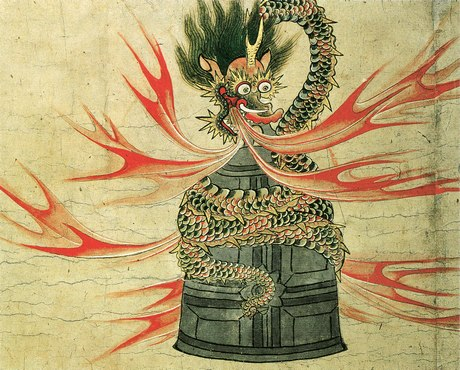
Dōjō-ji Engi emaki (Muromachi period); Important Cultural Property

- Wooden statue of Senjū Kannon (木造千手観音立像) (Heian period) (National Treasure)
- Wooden statues of Nikkō Bosatsu and Gakkō Bosatsu (木造菩薩立像 (伝日光・月光菩薩)) (Heian period) (National Treasures)
- Wooden statue of Senjū Kannon (木造千手観音立像) (Nara period) (Important Cultural Property)
- Wooden-core lacquer statue of Senjū Kannon (木心乾漆千手観音立像) (Nara period) (Important Cultural Property)
- Wooden statue of Jūichimen Kannon (木造十一面観音立像) (Heian period) (Important Cultural Property)
- Wooden statue of Bishamonten (木造毘沙門天立像) (Heian period) (Important Cultural Property)
- Wooden statues of the Four Heavenly Kings (木造四天王立像) (Heian period) (Important Cultural Property)
- Wooden statues of the Shaka Nyorai Triad (木造釈迦如来坐像及び両脇侍立像) (Nanboku-chō period) (Prefecturally-designated Cultural Property)

=== Other ===
- Dōjō-ji Engi emaki (紙本著色道成寺縁起), two scrolls (Muromachi period) (Important Cultural Property)
- Dōtaku (Yayoi period) (Prefecturally-designated Cultural Property)

== Anchin and Kiyohime ==
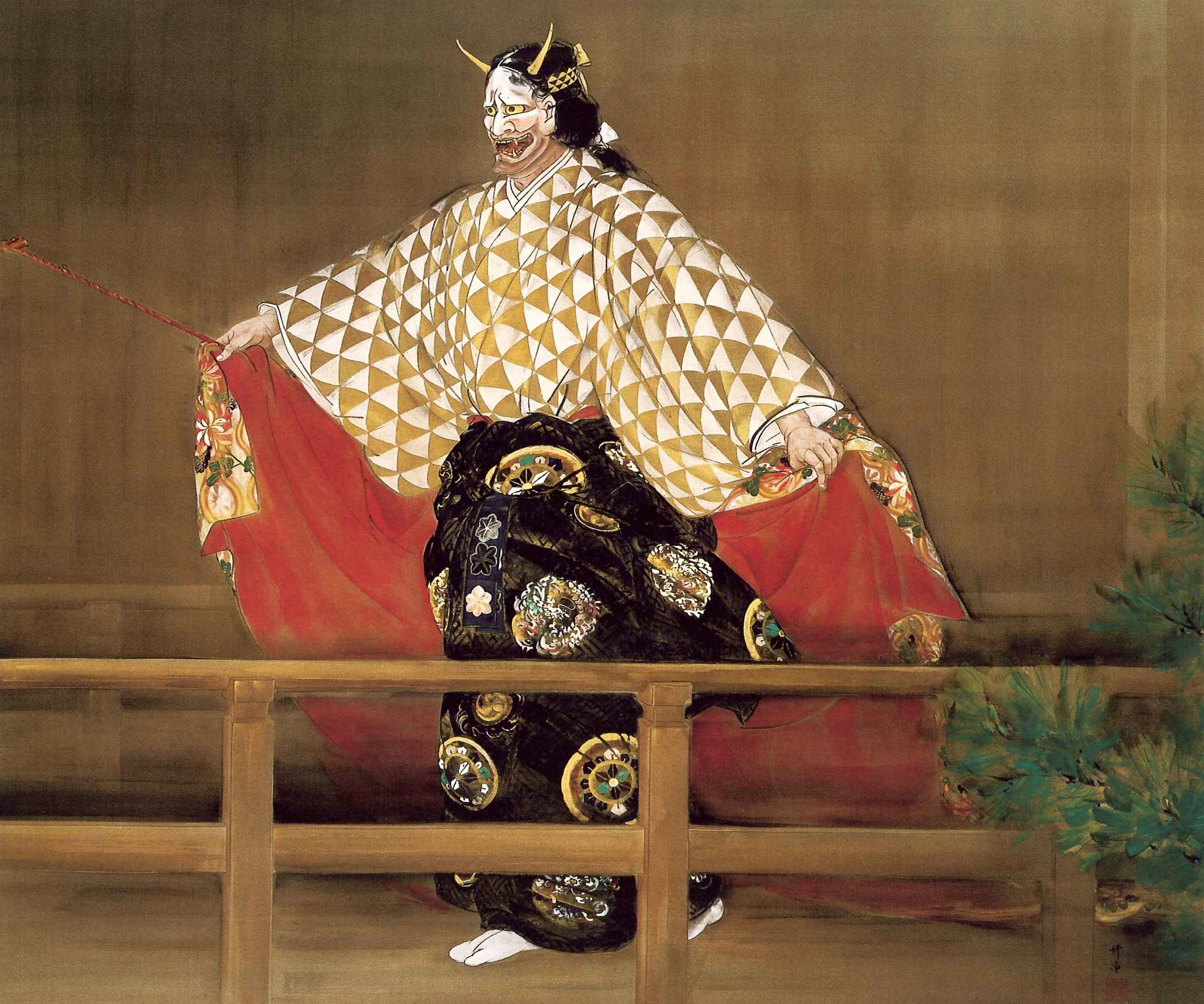
Dōjōji, Noh play

The story of the monk Anchin (安珍) and his spurned lover Kiyohime (清姫) who, devoured by her passion and jealousy, turns into a serpent and pursues him to his destruction, is the subject of the Noh play Dōjōji, known for the rare prominence of its dramatic prop, the temple bell; as well as the Kabuki play Musume Dōjōji with its long onnagata buyō.

== See also ==
- Dōjōji (Noh play)
- Japanese folklore
- List of National Treasures of Japan (sculptures)
- List of Historic Sites of Japan (Wakayama)
