= Onoe Kikugorō V =

Japanese actor (1844–1903)

Onoe Kikugorō V 五代目 尾上菊五郎
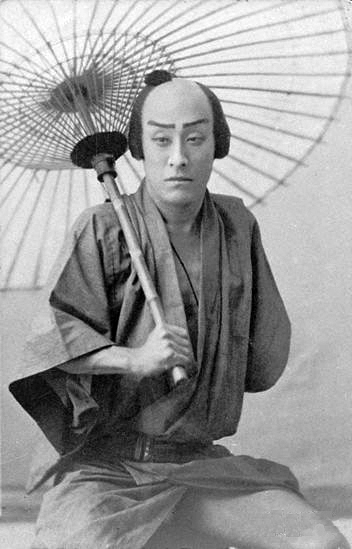
- Onoe Kikugorō V as Kamiyui Shinza, in the play "Tsuyu Kosode Mukashi Hachijō".
- Born: June 4, 1844; Edo, Japan
- Died: February 18, 1903 (aged 58)
- Other name: (Kikuya) Ichimura Kurōemon II → Ichimura Uzaemon XIII → Ichimura Kakitsu VIII → (Otowaya) Onoe Kikugorō V
- Occupation: Kabuki actor
- Years active: 1848–1902
- Father: Ichimura Takenojō V
- Relatives: Onoe Kikugorō III (grandfather); Ichimura Uzaemon XI (grandfather); Bando Kakitsu I (brother); Onoe Kikugorō VI (eldest son); Bandō Hikosaburō VI (youngest son); Ichimura Uzaemon XVII (grandson); Onoe Kurōemon II (grandson); Nakamura Kanzaburō XVIII (great-grandson); Bandō Rakuzen (great-grandson); Ichimura Manjirō II (great-grandson); Kawarasaki Gonjūrō IV (great-grandson); Nakamura Kankurō VI (great-great-grandson); Nakamura Shichinosuke II (great-great-grandson); Bandō Hikosaburō IX (great-great-grandson); Bandô Kamezō III (great-great-grandson); Onoe Ukon II (great-great-grandson); Ichimura Takematsu VI (great-great-grandson); Ichimura Hikaru (great-great-grandson); Nakamura Kantarō III (great-great-great-grandson); Nakamura Chōzaburō II (great-great-great-grandson); Bandô Kamesaburō VI (great-great-great-grandson)

Onoe Kikugorō V (Note: Real Name: Kiyoshi Terajima (Japanese: 寺島清, Hepburn: Terajima Kiyoshi).) (五代目 尾上菊五郎, Godaime Onoe Kikugorō; 4 June 1844 – 18 February 1903) was a Japanese Kabuki actor, one of the three most famous and celebrated of the Meiji period, along with Ichikawa Danjūrō IX and Ichikawa Sadanji I. Unlike most kabuki actors, who specialize in a particular type of role, Kikugorō, as a kaneru yakusha, played both tachiyaku (male heroes) and onnagata (women) roles and was best known for his roles in plays by Kawatake Mokuami. Kikugorō was also known as one of the chief actors in the "modern" subgenre of kabuki plays known as zangirimono ("cropped hair plays"), featuring Western-style clothes and hairstyle.

Kikugorō was a popular figure in ukiyo-e woodblock prints, especially in those by Toyohara Kunichika. He was also featured on Japanese postage stamps, and performed in one of the first motion pictures ever made in Japan, Momijigari, as Taira no Koremochi.

The "Ten Old and New Plays" (新古演劇十種, shinko engeki jisshu) associated with the Onoe family were chosen by Kikugorō V and his son Onoe Kikugorō VI, and include many of the plays for which Kikugorō V was himself most famous.

== Names and lineage ==
Like most kabuki actors, and many artists of his time, Kikugorō had a number of names over the course of his career. His guild name, or yagō, was Otowaya. He was at various times, and in different contexts, also known as Ichimura Kakitsu IV, Ichimura Uzaemon XIII, Ichimura Kurōemon, Onoe Baikō V, and Onoe Kurōemon I, and used Baikō and Kakitsu as his poetry names (haimyō).

The fifth actor in kabuki to bear the name Onoe Kikugorō, he was the son of Ichimura Takenojō V and the grandson of Ichimura Uzaemon XI and Onoe Kikugorō III. His brother was Bandō Kakitsu I. Kikugorō V had two biological sons, Onoe Kikugorō VI and Bandō Hikosaburō VI, and adopted Onoe Kikunosuke II and Onoe Baikō VI.

A number of actors active today are descended from Kikugorō V, including his great-grandson Nakamura Kanzaburō XVIII, one of the leading actors of recent years, and Kanzaburō's sons (Kikugorō's great-great-grandsons) Nakamura Shichinosuke II and Nakamura Kantarō II.

== Life and career ==
The actor who would later be known as Kikugorō V first appeared on stage at the age of four, in 1848, as Ichimura Kurōemon. Three years later, he succeeded his father to the name Uzaemon, as his father became Takenojō V and zamoto (head & manager) of the Ichimura-za theater.

Uzaemon XIII performed in the premieres of a number of plays by Kawatake Mokuami, the leading playwright of the bakumatsu period. These included the premiere of "Aoto Zōshi Hana no Nishiki-e" in March 1862, in which he played the lead role of Benten Kozō, and, many years later, the premieres of Tsuchigumo and Ibaraki, among many others. He took the name Ichimura Kakitsu in 1863 before becoming the fifth Onoe Kikugorō in 1868, and zagashira (stage manager, troupe leader) of the Nakamura-za the year following.

Kikugorō was among the actors who took part in a special performance at the Shintomi-za on July 16, 1879, in honor of Ulysses S. Grant. The play Gosannen Ōshū Gunki, metaphorically relating aspects of the American Civil War through the story of the Japanese 11th century Gosannen War, was written and performed especially for this occasion. He also performed at the grand opening of the Chitose-za theater in 1885, and before the Meiji Emperor two years later alongside Ichikawa Danjūrō IX and Ichikawa Sadanji I; this was the first time an emperor had deigned to watch a kabuki performance.

In November 1899 Kikugorō, along with Danjūrō IX were filmed performing three short scenes from the play Momijigari, with Kikugorō playing the demon princess Momiji. These scenes were filmed by pioneering Japanese filmmaker Shibata Tsunekichi. This 3 minute 50 second long film version of Momijigari is the oldest surviving example of Japanese narrative cinema.

Kikugorō was very devoted to his craft, and even visited the battlefield of the 1868 Battle of Ueno, during the battle, to see for himself what war was like, how soldiers behaved, so as to be able to better portray them on stage.

He performed countless times at the Ichimura-za and Kabuki-za (which opened in 1889) over the course of his career. Kikugorō made his final stage appearance at the latter, in November 1902, playing the roles of Benten Kozō, Shizue, and Kinai in a play entitled Chūshin Kanagaki Kōshaku; he died a few months later, on February 18, 1903, at the age of 58.
