= List of Japanese films before 1910 =

An incomplete list of the earliest films produced in Japan ordered by year between the 1898 and 1909. For an A-Z of films see Category:Japanese films.

== 1898-1909 ==
Title	Director	Cast	Genre	Notes
1898
Nuno sarashi			Short Documentary	
1899
Momijigari	Shibata Tsunekichi	Onoe Kikugoro V, Ichikawa Danjūrō IX	Kabuki	Designated an Important Cultural Property in 2009.
Osaka Dōtonbori no Zu				
Osaka Maiko no Odori				
Kappore				
Ginza Machi Jikkei				
Genroku Hanami Odori				
Koyo no Hashi		Atari Musashiya; Rokusuke Fukunakamuraya		Cinematography by Shiro Asano
Shin Kanoko		Botan Hinoya; Kaneko Numataya		Cinematography by Shiro Asano
Asakusa Nakamise				Cinematography by Shiro Asano
1908
Taikoki judanme		Sakiji Ichikawa, Kasen Nakamura, Utae Nakamura		Studio: M. Pathe. 17-minute print extant.
1909
Goban tadanobu	Shozo Makino	Matsunosuke Onoe, Ichitaro Kataoka, Kitsuraku Arashi		

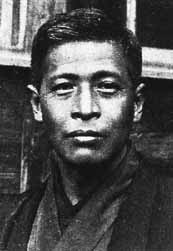
Pioneering director Shozo Makino

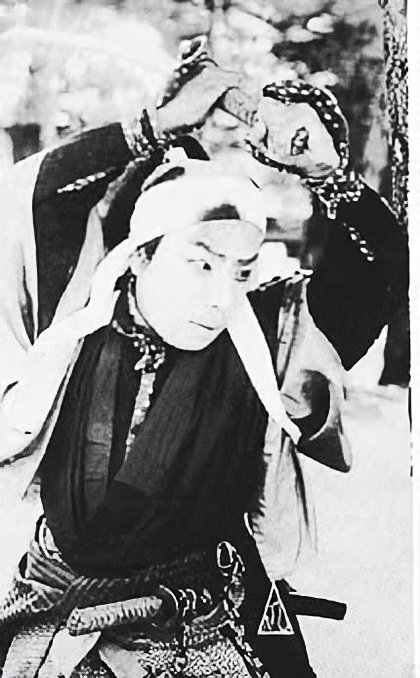
Chushingura godanme 1910
