= 1899 in literature =

This article contains information about the literary events and publications of 1899.

== Events ==
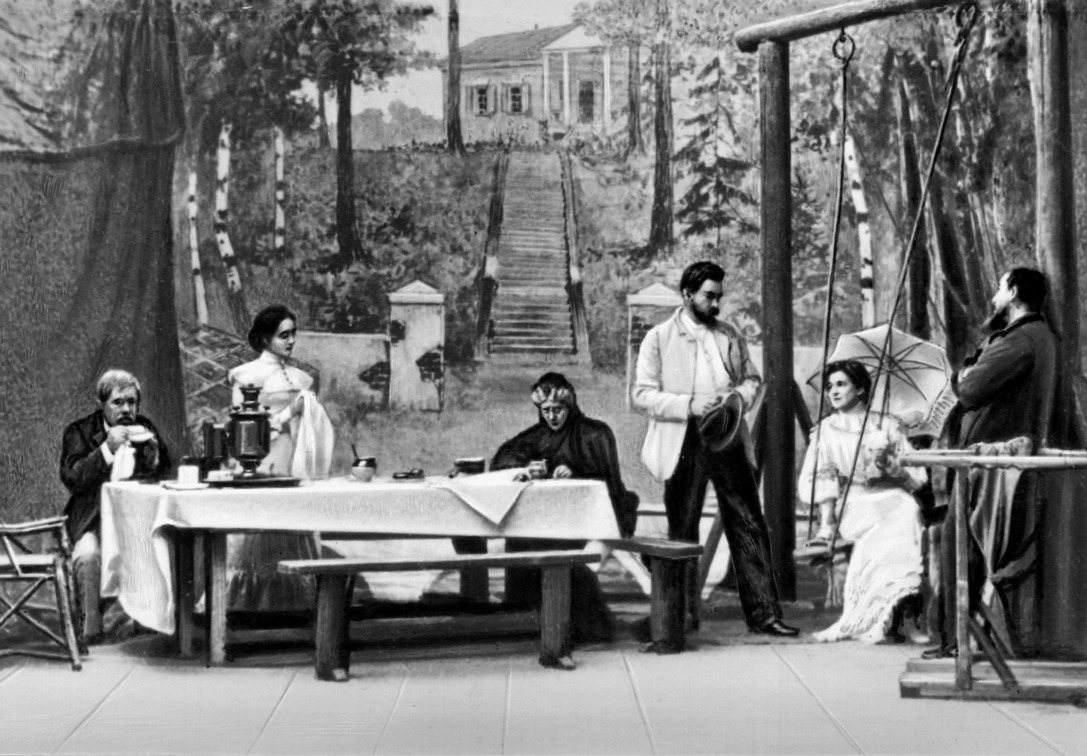
Moscow Art Theatre production of Uncle Vanya

- January 21 – The French actress Sarah Bernhardt, having taken over management of the Paris theatre she renames the Théâtre Sarah-Bernhardt, opens it in the title rôle of Victorien Sardou's La Tosca. On May 20 she premières an adaptation of William Shakespeare's Hamlet, with herself in the title rôle.
- March 20 – W. H. Davies, "tramp-poet", loses his foot trying to jump on a freight train at Renfrew, Ontario.
- April – Karl Kraus establishes the radical periodical Die Fackel (The Torch) in Vienna.
- April–June – Rainer Maria Rilke, still an art student at the time, travels to Moscow to meet Leo Tolstoy.
- May–December – The only work of fiction by the British politician Winston Churchill, Savrola: A Tale of the Revolution in Laurania, is serialised in Macmillan's Magazine.
- May – Jack London's first published work, the short story "A Thousand Deaths", appears in The Black Cat; its acceptance convinces London that he can make a living from literature.
- May 8 – The Irish Literary Theatre, founded by W. B. Yeats, Augusta, Lady Gregory, George Moore and Edward Martyn, puts on its first production in Dublin, a version of Yeats' verse drama The Countess Cathleen.
- June 20 – The English writer Edward Thomas, an Oxford undergraduate at this time, marries Helen Noble at Fulham register office.
- July 31 – Arthur Machen's wife Amy dies after a long illness, an event that has a devastating effect on him.
- September 1 – The National Theatre in Norway opens with pieces by Holberg and Bjørnstjerne Bjørnson's 1862 trilogy Sigurd Slembe.
- September – The British Mutoscope and Biograph Company's King John (a very short silent film starring Herbert Beerbohm Tree) becomes the first known film based on a Shakespeare play.
- November – The oldest surviving Japanese film, Momijigari, is shot by Tsunekichi Shibata in Tokyo. It records the kabuki actors Onoe Kikugorō V and Ichikawa Danjūrō IX performing a scene from the play Momijigari.

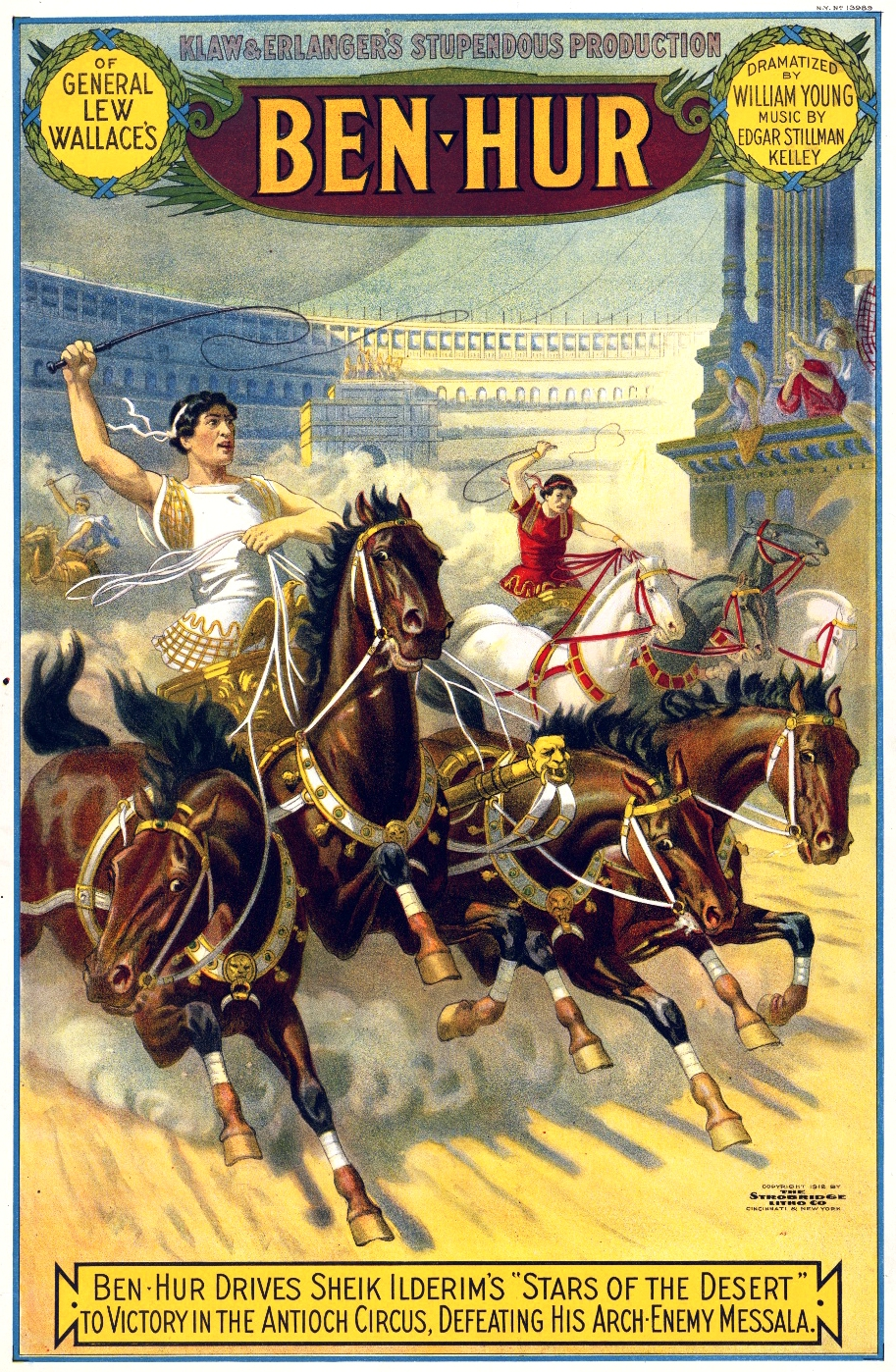
Broadway production of Ben-Hur

- November 6 – William Gillette's play Sherlock Holmes, based (with authorisation) on the writings of Arthur Conan Doyle, opens in New York City with himself in the title rôle.
- November 7 (October 26 Old Style) – Anton Chekhov's Uncle Vanya («Дя́дя Ва́ня», Dyádya Ványa), a reworking of his The Wood Demon (1889), receives its Russian metropolitan première at the Moscow Art Theatre, with Konstantin Stanislavski directing and playing the rôle of Astrov, and Olga Knipper as Yeléna.
- November 18 – Leo Tolstoy completes his last novel, Resurrection («Воскресение», Voskreseniye), published serially in Niva.
- December 12 – Herbert Putnam is appointed Librarian of Congress in the United States, where he will introduce in practice the Library of Congress Classification (LCC) scheme.
- December – The imprisoned William Sydney Porter's pseudonym O. Henry first appears over the short story "Whistling Dick's Christmas Stocking" in this month's McClure's Magazine.
- unknown dates
  - Curtis Brown (literary agents) is established in London by the American Albert Curtis Brown.
  - Edgar Rice Burroughs begins a brief spell working in his father's battery business.
  - Simon Pokagon's O-gi-maw-kwe Mit-I-gwa-ki (Queen of the Woods) is published, the first novel both by and about Native Americans in the United States.
  - Lin Shu's first translation into Chinese from a Western text, The Lady of the Camellias, is published as 巴黎茶花女遺事.
  - The first series of the Arden Shakespeare under the general editorship of W. J. Craig begins publication by Methuen in London with an edition of Hamlet edited by Edward Dowden.
  - The Bulgarian language is officially codified.

== New books ==
=== Fiction ===
- Anna Adolph – Arqtiq
- Victor Anestin – În anul 4000 sau O călătorie la Venus (In the year 4000, or A trip to Venus)
- Machado de Assis – Dom Casmurro
- René Bazin – La terre qui meurt
- René Boylesve – Demoiselle Cloque
- Mary Elizabeth Braddon – His Darling Sin
- Rhoda Broughton – The Game and the Candle
- Charles Waddell Chesnutt – The Conjure Woman
- Mary Cholmondeley – Red Pottage
- Kate Chopin – The Awakening
- J. Storer Clouston – The Lunatic at Large
- Ralph Connor – The Sky Pilot
- Joseph Conrad – serializations in Blackwood's Magazine
  - Heart of Darkness (February–April)
  - Lord Jim (October 1899–November 1900)
- Stephen Crane – The Monster and Other Stories
- Cora Linn Daniels – The Bronze Buddha: A Mystery
- Margaret Deland – Old Chester Tales
- Maxim Gorky – Foma Gordyeeff
- G. A. Henty – The Golden Canon
- Robert Hichens – The Slave
- E. W. Hornung – The Amateur Cracksman (collected stories)
- Henry James – The Awkward Age
- Selma Lagerlöf – The Tale of a Manor (En herrgårdssägen)
- Octave Mirbeau – The Torture Garden
- A. E. W. Mason – Man and His Kingdom
- Arthur Morrison – To London Town
- Frank Norris
  - Blix
  - McTeague
- George Paston – A Writer of Books
- Władysław Reymont – The Promised Land (Ziemia Obiecana; book publication)
- Pamela Colman Smith – Annancy Stories
- Somerville and Ross – Some Experiences of an Irish R.M. (stories, first volume in the series The Irish R.M.)
- Leo Tolstoy – Resurrection
- Juan Valera y Alcalá-Galiano – Morsamor
- H. G. Wells – "The Sleeper Awakes"
- Edith Wharton – "The Greater Inclination"
- Émile Zola – Fécondité (Fruitfulness)

=== Children and young people ===
- Helen Bannerman – Little Black Sambo
- L. Frank Baum – Father Goose: His Book
- Tom Bevan – The Thane of the Dean: A Tale of the Time of the Conqueror
- Géza Gárdonyi – Eclipse of the Crescent Moon (Egri csillagok i. e. Stars of Eger)
- E. Nesbit – The Story of the Treasure Seekers (first in the Bastable series)
- Ethel Pedley – Dot and the Kangaroo
- Josephine Pollard
  - Bible Stories for Children
  - History of The Old Testament in Words of One Syllable
  - History of The New Testament in Words of One Syllable
- Edward Stratemeyer as Arthur M. Winfield
  - The Rover Boys at School
  - The Rover Boys on the Ocean
  - The Rover Boys in the Jungle (first three in the Rover Boys series of 30 books)

=== Drama ===
- Anton Chekhov – Uncle Vanya
- Arnold Denham (probably with others) – The Kelly Gang
- Georges Feydeau – La Dame de chez Maxim
- Clyde Fitch – Barbara Frietchie
- Henrik Ibsen – When We Dead Awaken (Når vi døde vågner)
- Leon Kobrin – Minna or, The Ruined Family from Downtown
- Mulshankar Mulani – Ajabkumari
- Arthur Wing Pinero – The Gay Lord Quex
- Stanisław Wyspiański
  - Klątwa (The Curse)
  - Meleager
  - Protesilas i Leodamia
- William Young (adaptation) – Ben-Hur

=== Poetry ===
- W. B. Yeats – The Wind Amongst the Reeds

=== Non-fiction ===
- Qasim Amin – The Liberation of Women (Tahrir al- mar'a)
- Edward Bernstein – Evolutionary Socialism
- Eliza Brightwen – Rambles with Nature Students
- Houston Stewart Chamberlain – The Foundations of the Nineteenth Century (Die Grundlagen des neunzehnten Jahrhunderts)
- Auguste Choisy – Histoire de l'architecture
- Percy Dearmer – The Parson's Handbook
- John Dewey – The School and Society
- Emilia, Lady Dilke – French Painters of the Eighteenth Century (first of four volumes)
- W. E. B. DuBois - The Philadelphia Negro
- Sigmund Freud – The Interpretation of Dreams (Die Traumdeutung) (dated 1900)
- Edward Bruce Hamley (died 1893) – National Defence
- Elbert Hubbard – A Message to Garcia
- Gertrude Jekyll – Wood and Garden
- Arthur Symons – The Symbolist Movement in Literature (first collected edition)
- Thorstein Veblen – The Theory of the Leisure Class

== Births ==
- January 17 – Nevil Shute (Nevil Shute Norway), English novelist (died 1960)
- February 3 – Lao She, Chinese author (died 1966)
- February 23 – Erich Kästner, German children's author (died 1974)
- March 8 – Eric Linklater, Welsh-born Scottish novelist and travel writer (died 1974)
- March 19 – Aksel Sandemose, Danish novelist (died 1965)
- March 25 – Jacques Audiberti, French playwright (died 1965)
- April 22 – Vladimir Nabokov, Russian-born novelist (died 1977)
- May 8 – Friedrich Hayek, Austrian-born social scientist (died 1992)
- May 18 – D. Gwenallt Jones, Welsh poet (died 1968)
- May 24
  - Kazi Nazrul Islam, Bengali poet (died 1976)
  - Henri Michaux, Belgian-born poet, writer and painter (died 1984)
- June 7 – Elizabeth Bowen, Irish-born English novelist and short-story writer (died 1973)
- June 11 – Yasunari Kawabata, Japanese novelist, short-story writer and Nobel laureate in Literature (died 1972)
- June 18 – Eugène Vinaver, Russian-born English literary scholar (died 1979)
- July 1 – James Lennox Kerr (Peter Dawlish, Gavin Douglas), Scottish novelist and children's writer (died 1963)
- July 8 – G. B. Edwards, Guernsey-born writer (died 1976)
- July 11 – E. B. White, American children's writer and writer on style (died 1985)
- July 21
  - Hart Crane, American poet (suicide 1932)
  - Ernest Hemingway, American novelist (suicide 1961)
- August 9
  - Laurence Meynell (Valerie Baxter, A. Stephen Tring), English novelist and children's writer (died 1989)
  - P. L. Travers (Helen Lyndon Goff), Australian children's writer (died 1996)
- August 24
  - Jorge Luis Borges, Argentinian writer (died 1986)
  - Gaylord DuBois, American author and poet (died 1993)
- August 27 – C. S. Forester, Egyptian-born English adventure novelist (died 1966)
- September 30 – Hendrik Marsman, Dutch poet (died 1940)
- October 19 - Miguel Ángel Asturias, (died 1974)
- November 10 – Kate Seredy, Hungarian-born American children's writer and illustrator (died 1975)
- November 17 – Roger Vitrac, French surrealist playwright and poet (died 1952)
- December 9 – Jean de Brunhoff, French children's author and illustrator (died 1937)
- December 16
  - Harold Walter Bailey, English linguistics scholar (died 1996)
  - Noël Coward, English playwright (died 1973)
- December 18 – Peter Wessel Zapffe, Norwegian philosopher (died 1990)

== Deaths ==
- February 10 – Archibald Lampman, Canadian poet (born 1861)
- March 16 – Alexander Balloch Grosart, Scottish literary editor (born 1827)
- May 1 – Ludwig Büchner, German philosopher (born 1824)
- May 16 – Francisque Sarcey, French journalist and theater critic (born 1827)
- June 7 – Augustin Daly, American dramatist and theater manager (born 1838)
- June 30 – E. D. E. N. Southworth, American novelist (born 1819)
- July 18 – Horatio Alger, Jr., American novelist and children's author (born 1832)
- August 27 – Vendela Hebbe, Swedish journalist and novelist (born 1808)
- August 29 – Catharine Parr Traill, English-born Canadian author (born 1802)
- October 22 – Ella H. Brockway Avann, American educator and writer (born 1853)
- October 25 – Grant Allen, Canadian science writer and novelist (born 1848)
- October 27 – Florence Marryat, English novelist and entertainer (born 1833)
- November 2 – Anna Swanwick, English feminist writer (born 1813)
- November 13 – Arthur Giry, French historian (born 1848)
- December 17 – Bernard Quaritch, German-born English bibliographer and bookseller (born 1819)
- December 18 – Bonifaciu Florescu, Romanian polygraph (ventricular hypertrophy, born 1848)
- December 22 – Dwight L. Moody, American preacher and publisher (born 1837)

== Awards ==
- Chancellor's Gold Medal – Arthur Cecil Pigou
- Newdigate Prize – Harold Edgeworth Butler
