= Ichimura Uzaemon XI =

Japanese theatre owner and actor

Ichimura Uzaemon XI 十一代目市羽村左衛門
- Tachibana orange mon (family crest) of Ichimura Uzaemon.
- Born: 1791; Edo, Japan
- Died: 11 July 1820 (aged 28–29); Edo, Japan
- Other names: Ichimura Kakitsu II, Ichimura Manjirō I
- Children: Ichimura Takenojō V (son)
- Father: Ichimura Uzaemon X
- Relatives: Bandō Kamezō I (younger brother); Azuma Ichinojō I (son-in-law); Onoe Kikugorō V (grandson); Bandō Kakitsu I (grandson); Bandō Kamesaburō I (grandson); Onoe Kikugorō VI (great-grandson); Bandō Hikosaburō VI (great-grandson); Ichimura Uzaemon XVII (great-great-grandson); Onoe Kurōemon II (great-great-grandson); Nakamura Kanzaburō XVIII (great-great-great-grandson); Bandō Rakuzen (great-great-great-grandson); Ichimura Manjirō II (great-great-great-grandson); Kawarazaki Gonjūrō IV (great-great-great-grandson); Nakamura Kankurō VI (great-great-great-great-grandson); Nakamura Shichinosuke II (great-great-great-great-grandson); Bandō Hikosaburō IX (great-great-great-great-grandson); Bandō Kamezō III (great-great-great-great-grandson); Onoe Ukon II (great-great-great-great-grandson); Ichimura Takematsu VI (great-great-great-great-grandson); Ichimura Hikaru (great-great-great-great-grandson); Nakamura Kantarō III (great-great-great-great-great-grandson); Nakamura Chōzaburō II (great-great-great-great-great-grandson); Bandō Kamesaburō VI (great-great-great-great-great-grandson)

Ichimura Uzaemon XI (十一代目市村羽左衛門, Jūichi-daime Ichimura Uzaemon) (1791-11 July 1820) was a zamoto (theatre owner-manager) of the Ichimura-za kabuki theatre in Edo, Japan. Like many zamoto, he was raised in a kabuki family and trained to be an actor, but rarely actually appeared on stage.

== Names and lineage ==
Given the name Ichimura Manjirō I upon his adoption by Ichimura Uzaemon X, he became the eleventh in the line of Ichimura Uzaemon upon the death of his adopted father. Uzaemon used "Kakitsu" as his haimyō (poetry pen-name).

His brother Bandō Kamezō I and son Ichimura Takenojō V were active actors on the stage, as were many of his grandsons, great-grandsons, and further descendants to whom he also passed on the position of zamoto. The current actors Nakamura Kantarō II, Nakamura Shichinosuke II, and Bandō Kamesaburō V are his great-great-great-great-grandsons.

== Life and career ==
He was born in Edo in 1791, the son of Fukuchi Mohei IV, a publisher and secondary manager of the Ichimura-za. At the age of two, he was adopted by Ichimura Uzaemon X in the same year that the theatre went bankrupt and closed, passing its license to the Kiri-za. The Ichimura-za reopened in 1798, and Uzaemon X died the following year. Manjirō, as he was then known, took on the name Uzaemon XI in 1800, officially becoming zamoto at the age of nine, though the actual administrative matters were handled by Fukuchi Zenbei, the owner of a shibai jaya (a teahouse within the theatre).

Uzaemon was only head of the Ichimura-za for fifteen years. During this short time, the theatre saw many productions, and hosted actors as famous as Matsumoto Kōshirō V and Iwai Hanshirō V. However, the theatre was also destroyed by fire three times over this period. Uzaemon struggled with the debts incurred by his predecessors, and the costs of repeatedly rebuilding the theatre; the Ichimura-za declared bankruptcy in 1815, transferring its license to the Kiri-za once again. The license was then passed to the Miyako-za when the Kiri-za went bankrupt in 1817, and again to the Tamagawa-za when the Miyako-za went bankrupt in turn the following year.

Uzaemon died in Edo in 1820, at the age of 29.
