= Koide Ichijūrō =

Japanese kabuki composer-performer (died 1800)

Koide Ichijūrō (湖出市十郎, died 29 October 1800) was a Japanese kabuki composer-performer (唄方 uta-kata) of "long songs" (長唄 naga uta) of the Edo period. He was at first a student of Yoshizumi Kosaburo 1st (1699-1753) and identified himself as Yoshizumi Ichijuro. From 1747 he appeared at the Morita-za, one of the three venues of Edo. Afterwards he became a disciple of Fujita Yoshiji 1st (1714-1771）, and changed his own stagename to Fujita Okada. In 1768 he took the name Koide, and in opposition to Fujita Yoshiji's monopoly on the Ichimura-za, became active at the Nakamura-za, together with Nakamura Fujiro 1st (1719–86), receiving recognition also in Osaka. During the Meiwa-Tenmei period (1764–89) when the meriyasu genre of solo songs was in vogue he received recognition for shirotae (白妙, "white cloth cherry") and the kouta song kurokami ("black hair"). The name Ichijūrō was taken up by 2nd, 3rd, (and according to one tradition a 4th) generation of performers of his songs.
