= Nakamura Shichinosuke II =

Japanese actor (born 1983)

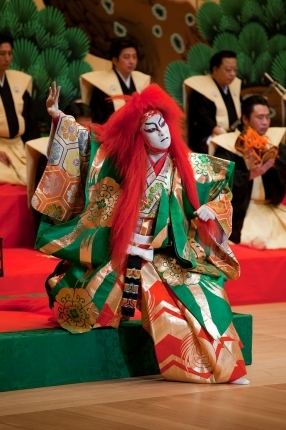
- Nakamura Shichinosuke II performing Renjishi in Yokohama, 2010
- Born: Takayuki Namino; May 18, 1983 (age 43); Tokyo, Japan
- Other name: Nakamuraya
- Years active: 1995-present
- Father: Nakamura Kanzaburō XVIII
- Relatives: Nakamura Kanzaburō XVII (grandfather); Nakamura Shikan VII (grandfather); Nakamura Kankurō VI (older brother); Ai Maeda (sister-in-law); Nakamura Kantarō III (nephew); Nakamura Chōzaburō II (nephew)

Nakamura Shichinosuke II (二代目 中村 七之助, Nidaime Nakamura Shichinosuke) (born May 18, 1983) is a Japanese Kabuki, theatre, TV, and film actor. He was born Takayuki Namino (波野 隆行, Namino Takayuki), the second son of famed Kabuki performer, Nakamura Kanzaburō XVIII. Unlike many kabuki actors, who specialize in a single type of role, Shichinosuke plays both male (tachiyaku) and female (onnagata) parts.

== Name and lineage ==
Nakamura, often represented as "Shichinosuke Nakamura" in reference to his American film career, is a member of the kabuki guild Nakamura-ya, and currently performs kabuki along with his brother Nakamura Kankurō VI. His family can trace their lineage back, within the kabuki world, at least seven generations, to Onoe Kikugorō III and Ichimura Uzaemon XI, who performed in the early 19th century. As is the case with the names of all kabuki actors, "Nakamura Shichinosuke" is a yagō or stage name.

He is the second actor to inherit the name Nakamura Shichinosuke, as the first was actor Nakamura Kanzaburō IX (九代目 中村勘三郎), who used the name Nakamura Shichinosuke I (初代 中村七之助) from 1769 to 1770.

== Life and career ==
In September 1986 he made his first appearance on stage at the Kabuki-za, taking the name Nakamura Shichinosuke the following year. Within a few years he was described as "one of the 21st Century's most promising young Kabuki Actors". He has performed Kabuki in numerous international theaters, often alongside his father and brother, as part of the Heisei Nakamura-za. He also performs annually in Asakusa Kabuki at the Asakusa Kōkaidō, a production aimed at attracting the younger generation and encouraging in them an interest in kabuki.

In 1994, Shichinosuke performed in the modern play "Sukapan". He has also appeared in such NHK (Japan Broadcasting Corporation) TV drama series as Takeda Shingen (a dramatization of Shingen's life), and Genroku Ryoran.

Nakamura graduated from high school in March 2002 and the following year he played the role of Emperor Meiji in Edward Zwick's movie The Last Samurai. The Last Samurai marks his film debut. In 2004 he appeared in the film version of Wataya Risa's novel Insutooru, and in 2005, he played an Edo period recovering drug addict in the absurdly comical film Mayonaka no Yaji-san Kita-san, based on a comic book.

Nakamura was arrested in January 2005 in Tokyo's Bunkyō-ku for punching a police officer after a taxi driver claimed he did not pay his fare while intoxicated in what could be the first arrest of a kabuki actor since the arrest of Ichikawa Gonjūrō for a murder charge in 1871. The subsequent controversy after the arrest barred Nakamura from participating in the celebration of his father's shūmei (naming ceremony) in March 2005.

== Personal life ==
On April 18, 2025, Shichinosuke II announced through his agency that he will soon be getting married. Although the identity of his wife is still unknown (due to her not being in the Japanese show business industry), Shichinosuke II's future wife is said to be younger than him (in her 30s) and is a famous geisha (geiko) from Kyoto who was the number 1 geiko in Kyoto before she started dating Shichinosuke II.

Before announcing his marriage, Shichinosuke II was known as "The Last Great Bachelor of Kabuki", since except him, most of the Kabuki actors of his generation (including his older brother, Kankurō VI) had already married and even started families.

According to him, his favorite hobbies are watching plays (such as Kabuki, Rakugo and Kōdan) and running (he started running more often during the COVID-19 pandemic).

== Filmography ==
=== Film ===
- The Last Samurai (2003) - Emperor Meiji
- Install (2004) - Kouichi
- Mayonaka no Yaji-san Kita-san (2005) - Kitahachi
- Shinema kabuki: Renjishi (2008)
- The Tale of the Princess Kaguya (2013) - Mikado (voice)

=== Television ===
- Takeda Shingen (1988) - young Takeda Yoshinobu
- Idaten (2019) - Sanyūtei Enshō VI
- Nakamura Nakazo: Shusse no Kizahashi (2021)
- Taiga Drama ga Umareta Hi (2023) - Keiji Sada
- What Will You Do, Ieyasu? (2023) - Ishida Mitsunari

== See also ==
- Nakamura Kanzaburō
