= Ichimura =

Ichimura (written: 一村 lit. "one village", 市村 lit. "market village" or 壱智村) is a Japanese surname. Notable people with the surname include:

- Atsushi Ichimura (市村 篤司, born 1984), Japanese footballer
- Kazuaki Ichimura (市村 和昭, born 1957), Japanese speed skater
- Koichiro Ichimura (市村 浩一郎, born 1964), Japanese politician
- Masachika Ichimura (市村 正親, born 1949), Japanese actor and singer
- Masami Ichimura (市村 政美, born 1950), Japanese alpine skier
- Oma Ichimura (壱智村 小真, born 1977), Japanese voice actor
- Takanori Ichimura (born 1979), Japanese curler
- Tetsuya Ichimura (一村 哲也, born 1930), Japanese photographer
- Ichimura Tetsunosuke (市村 鉄之助, 1854–?), Japanese page and member of the Shinsengumi
- Toshikazu Ichimura (born 1941), Japanese aikidoka
- Ichimura Uzaemon XI (十一代目市村羽左衛門, 1791–1820), Japanese kabuki theater owner

== See also ==
- Ichimura-za (市村座), a former kabuki theater in Edo, Japan
- 23628 Ichimura, a main-belt minor planet
- Ichimura at Brushstroke, a Japanese restaurant located in New York City
