= Bandō Kakitsu I =

Japanese kabuki actor

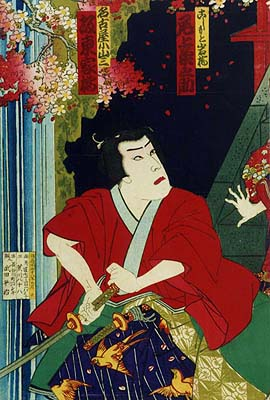
- A print made by Toyohara Kunichika in 1885, depicting Kakitsu in the role of Nagoya Kosanza in Monogusa Tarosaku Tekuda no Utaate
- Born: Ichimura Takematsu III; 1847
- Died: March 18, 1893 (aged 45–46)
- Other names: Ichimura Kakitsu V, Ichimura Uzaemon XIV, Ichimura Takematsu III
- Occupation: Kabuki actor
- Years active: 1847-1893
- Children: Ichimura Uzaemon XV (adopted son)
- Father: Ichimura Takenojō V
- Relatives: Onoe Kikugorō V (older brother)

Bandō Kakitsu I (初代 坂東 家橘, Shodai Bandō Kakitsu; 1847 – March 18, 1893) was a Japanese kabuki actor of the Uzaemon acting lineage, also commonly known as Ichimura Uzaemon XIV (十四代目 市村 羽左衛門, Jūyondaime Ichimura Uzaemon). He was an influential actor during the Kaei through Meiji eras of the Japanese imperial calendar. He is best known for his wagotoshi roles.

== Lineage ==
Born into a well-known Kabuki acting family from Edo (present-day Tokyo), Kakitsu I was the grandson of Ichimura Uzaemon XI (十一代目 市村羽左衛門), the eleventh zamoto (owner) of Ichimura-za, a renowned Kabuki theater in Edo.

His father, Ichimura Takenojō V (五代目 市村竹之丞) was an influential tachiyaku who was also a renowned zamoto, being the twelfth owner of the Ichimura-za (a renowned Kabuki theater in Edo) and who was also known for his lavish and extravagant lifestyle.

== Early life ==
Bandō Kakitsu I was born in 1847, the son of kabuki actor Ichimura Takenojō V. In November 1848, Kakitsu appeared on stage for the first time under the stage name Ichimura Takematsu III. His father suddenly grew ill and died on August 20, 1851.

== Career ==
In August 1868, Kakitsu took the name Ichimura Uzaemon XIV in a traditional actor naming ceremony called a shūmei. He became the zamoto (manager, troupe head) of the Ichimura-za.

In November 1868, he produced the play Kanadehon Chūshingura, and played the roles of En'ya Hangan, Ōboshi Rikiya and Ashikaga Tadayoshi.

September 1871 brought debt to the Ichimura-za too great for Kakitsu to handle, forcing him to leave the theater to Fukuchi Mohei, who changed the name to Murayama-za.

Kakitsu returned in November 1871 to perform in the classic Yoshitsune Senbon Zakura.

Kakitsu appeared on stage for the last time in March 1893 in the drama Yamabiraki Meguro Shinfuji. He died soon afterward.

== Notable Roles ==
Year	Theater	Play	Roles	Notes
1868	Ichimura-za	Kanadehon Chūshingura	En'ya Hangan, Ōboshi Rikiya and Ashikaga Tadayoshi	Also the producer, acted in the theater he managed
1871	Nakamura-za	Yoshitsune Senbon Zakura		
1873	Murayama-za	Taiko no Oto Chiyū Sanryaku	Sakurai, Takigawa and Ukyō	
1873	Nakamura-za	Tsuyu Kosode Mukashi Hachijō	Chūshichi	The play is also commonly referred to as Kamiyui Shinza
1873	Murayama-za	Hana Momiji Nori no Ongaku		
1881	Shintomi-za	Kumo ni Magō Ueno no Hatsuhana	Lord Matsue	The play is also commonly referred to as Kōchiyama
1881	Shintomi-za	Tsuchigumo	Minamoto no Raikō	
1886	Chitose-za	Mekura Nagaya Ume-ga-Kagatobi	Minosuke	The play is also commonly referred to as Kagatobi
1893	Ichimura-za	Yamabiraki Meguro Shinfuji		This was his final stage appearance
