= Yaji and Kita: The Midnight Pilgrims =

- DVD cover
- Directed by: Kankurō Kudō
- Written by: Kotobuki Shiriagari (original story); Kankurō Kudō (screenplay)
- Produced by: Mitsuru Uda; Yoshinori Fujita
- Starring: Tomoya Nagase; Shichinosuke Nakamura; Eiko Koike; Riki Takeuchi; Suzuki Matsuo; Kankuro Nakamura
- Cinematography: Toshiyasu Yamanaka
- Edited by: Soichi Ueno
- Music by: Zazen Boys
- Distributed by: Asmik Ace
- Release date: April 2, 2005 (Japan)
- Running time: 124 minutes
- Country: Japan
- Language: Japanese

Yaji and Kita: The Midnight Pilgrims (Japanese: 真夜中の弥次さん喜多さん, Hepburn: Mayonaka no Yaji-san Kita-san) is a 2005 Japanese film directed by Kankurō Kudō. The film stars several well-known and highly respected Japanese actors. It is based on the manga series Yajikita in Deep by Kotobuki Shiriagari.

The story follows two Edo-era gay men, Yaji Robei (Yaji) and Kita Hachi (Kita), on a pilgrimage to Ise Shrine. It is loosely based on the Tōkaidōchū Hizakurige.

== Plot ==
Yaji and Kita are two men who live in Edo. They are deeply in love. Yaji is married to a woman, while Kita is an actor addicted to various drugs.

One day, they receive an advertisement for the Grand Shrine at Ise, and decide to set out on a pilgrimage there, hoping to cure Kita of his drug addiction. They set out on a modern motorcycle but are forced to turn back and walk the Tōkaidō road to Ise, encountering various characters and obstacles along the way.

== Cast ==
- Yaji: Nagase Tomoya from the band TOKIO
- Kita: Nakamura Shichinosuke, a well-known kabuki actor
- Kin-kin: Sadao Abe
- Ohatsu: Koike Eiko, a Japanese idol
- Hige no oiran (the bearded courtesan): Suzuki Matsuo
- King Arthur: Nakamura Kanzaburō, a kabuki actor
- Bartender: Arata
- Bartender's wife: Aso Kumiko
- Spirit of the dead: Arakawa Yoshiyoshi
- Non-non: Emoto Tasuku
- Naniwa Hotto: Itsuji Itao
- Foreman: Iwamatsu Ryō
- Vendor: Minagawa Sarutoki
- Landlady: Morishita Aiko
- Newsdealer: Namase Katsuhisa
- Tourists: Ogi Hiroaki, Yahagi Ken
- Samurai: Nao Ōmori
- Oyuki: Shimizu Yumi
- Tower Phonographs owner: Shiriagari Kotobuki
- Kimura Shonoshin : Riki Takeuchi
- Policeman: Terajima Susumu
- Fantom Yaji: Tsumabuki Satoshi
- Old man: Kazuo Umezu
- Ochin: Yamaguchi Tomomitsu
