= Shinko engeki jisshu =

Shinko engeki jisshu or Shinko engeki jusshu (新古演劇十種; lit. "New and old plays, ten varieties") is a collection of kabuki plays strongly associated with the Onoe Kikugorō line of kabuki actors. Akin to the Kabuki Jūhachiban ("Kabuki Eighteen") of the Ichikawa Danjūrō lineage, the compilation of the Shinko engeki jisshu was begun by Onoe Kikugorō V and completed by his son Onoe Kikugorō VI.

These represent the greatest plays of the Bakumatsu (c. 1853–1867) and Meiji periods (1868–1912), and many were written by Kawatake Mokuami the most celebrated playwright today of that period. The premiere of each of these plays featured either Kikugorō V, his grandfather Onoe Kikugorō III, or his son Kikugorō VI, and the Onoe family continues to dominate the leading roles in these plays today.

== The Ten ==
- Rakan
- Kodera no Neko
- Tsuchigumo
- Ibaraki
- Hitotsuya
- Modoribashi
- Kikujidō
- Hagoromo (play)
- Migawari Zazen
- Osakabe Hime

Rakan and Kodera no Neko were performed first by Kikugorō III; Migawari Zazen and Osakabe Hime were added to the list by Kikugorō VI.
