= Kankuro =

Kankuro (Kankurō) is an old-fashioned Japanese given name rarely used in modern Japan.

== Real people ==
- Kankurō Kudō, actor-screenwriter.
- The kabuki actors known as Nakamura Kankurō, including:
  - Nakamura Kanzaburō XVIII, actor who previously known as Nakamura Kankurō V.
- Saitō Dōsan, warrior and merchant, also known as Nishimura Kankurō Masatoshi.

== Fictional characters ==
- Kankuro (Naruto), a fictional character in the anime and manga series Naruto.
