= Nakamura Kanzaburō XVIII =

Kabuki actor (1955–2012)

Nakamura Kanzaburō XVIII 十八代目 中村 勘三郎
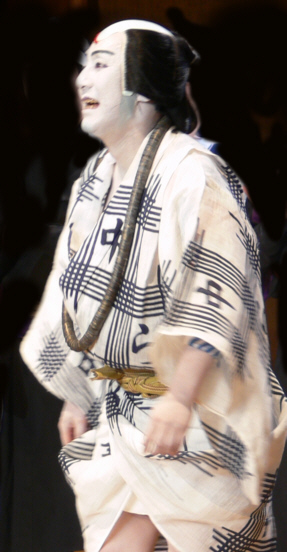
- Born: Noriaki Namino; May 30, 1955; Tokyo, Japan
- Died: December 5, 2012 (aged 57)
- Other name: Nakamura Kankurō V
- Years active: 1959–2012
- Children: Nakamura Kankurō VI (eldest son); Nakamura Shichinosuke II (youngest son)
- Father: Nakamura Kanzaburō XVII
- Relatives: Onoe Kikugorō III (great-great-great-grandfather); Ichimura Uzaemon XI (great-great-great-grandfather); Ichimura Takenojō V (great-great-grandfather); Onoe Kikugorō V (great-grandfather); Nakamura Karoku I (great-grandfather); Onoe Kikugorō VI (grandfather); Bandō Hikosaburō VI (great-uncle); Nakamura Karoku III (grandfather); Nakamura Kichiemon I (uncle); Nakamura Tokizō III (uncle); Nakamura Shikan VII (father-in-law); Nakamura Fukusuke IX (brother-in-law); Nakamura Shikan VII (brother-in-law); Ai Maeda (daughter-in-law); Nakamura Kantarō III (grandson); Nakamura Chōzaburō II (grandson); Nakamura Tokizō IV (cousin); Yorozuya Kinnosuke (cousin); Nakamura Shidō I (cousin); Nakamura Kashō II (cousin); Matsumoto Hakuō II (cousin); Nakamura Kichiemon II (cousin); Nakamura Tokizō V (cousin); Nakamura Matagorō III (cousin); Nakamura Shidō II (cousin); Nakamura Karoku V (cousin); Nakamura Kinnosuke II (cousin)

Nakamura Kanzaburō XVIII (十八代目 中村 勘三郎, Jūhachidaime Nakamura Kanzaburō; born Noriaki Namino (波野 哲明, Namino Noriaki); May 30, 1955 – December 5, 2012), was a Japanese actor active in kabuki, other forms of live theatre, television and commercials. Kanzaburō was a versatile actor whose credits include farce, period pieces and Shin Kabuki.

== Lineage ==
Kanzaburō was the eighteenth in the line of Nakamura Kanzaburō, his father the seventeenth. Kanzaburō actually traced his ancestry within the Nakamuraya kabuki guild back to his great-great-great grandfathers, if not further. Both his grandfathers were kabuki actors, as were their fathers.

Kanzaburō was the younger brother of film actress Kuriko Namino. With his wife Yoshie, he had two sons, Nakamura Kankurō VI and Nakamura Shichinosuke II. Both perform kabuki, and in other venues.

== Life and career ==
He made his debut under the name Nakamura Kankurō V in April 1959 in the role of Momotaro. His kabuki credits under that name include roles in Kagami-jishi, Kamiyui Shinza and Yotsuya Kaidan.

In addition to performing at the Kabuki-za and other kabuki venues, Kankurō helped establish the Heisei Nakamura-za, a temporary kabuki stage erected for only one set of performances, in a variety of locations. He erected it, and performed on it, in Asakusa (Tokyo), Osaka, and, in 2004, on a US tour, performing in Boston, New York, and Washington DC. The Heisei Nakamura-za performed again in New York and Washington in 2007.

He made his film debut at age four in Thus Another Day (1959), which also starred his father. Noteworthy television roles include Imagawa Yoshimoto in the 1988 Taiga drama Takeda Shingen, Oishi Kuranosuke in the 1999 Taiga drama Genroku Ryoran, Terumasa Ikeda in 武蔵 MUSASHI (2003), and a TBS special Koyoi wa KANKURO. Commercial endorsements include Contac, Japan Post, JT, Suntory and Tokyo Mitsubishi Bank.

He took the name Kanzaburō at a shūmei on March 3, 2005.

== Illness and death ==
In June 2011, Kanzaburō revealed to the public that he was suffering from esophageal cancer, and was receiving treatment. On December 5, 2012, Kanzaburō died from acute respiratory distress, four months before the Kabuki-za re-opened in Tokyo.

== Awards and honors ==
- 2002 Golden Arrow Award
- 2004 Kikuchi Kan Prize
- 2008 Medal of Honor with purple ribbon
- 2012 Order of the Rising Sun, 3rd Class, Gold Rays with Neck Ribbon (posthumous)
