= Kawarazaki-za =

- 河原崎座
- Shinbori-za
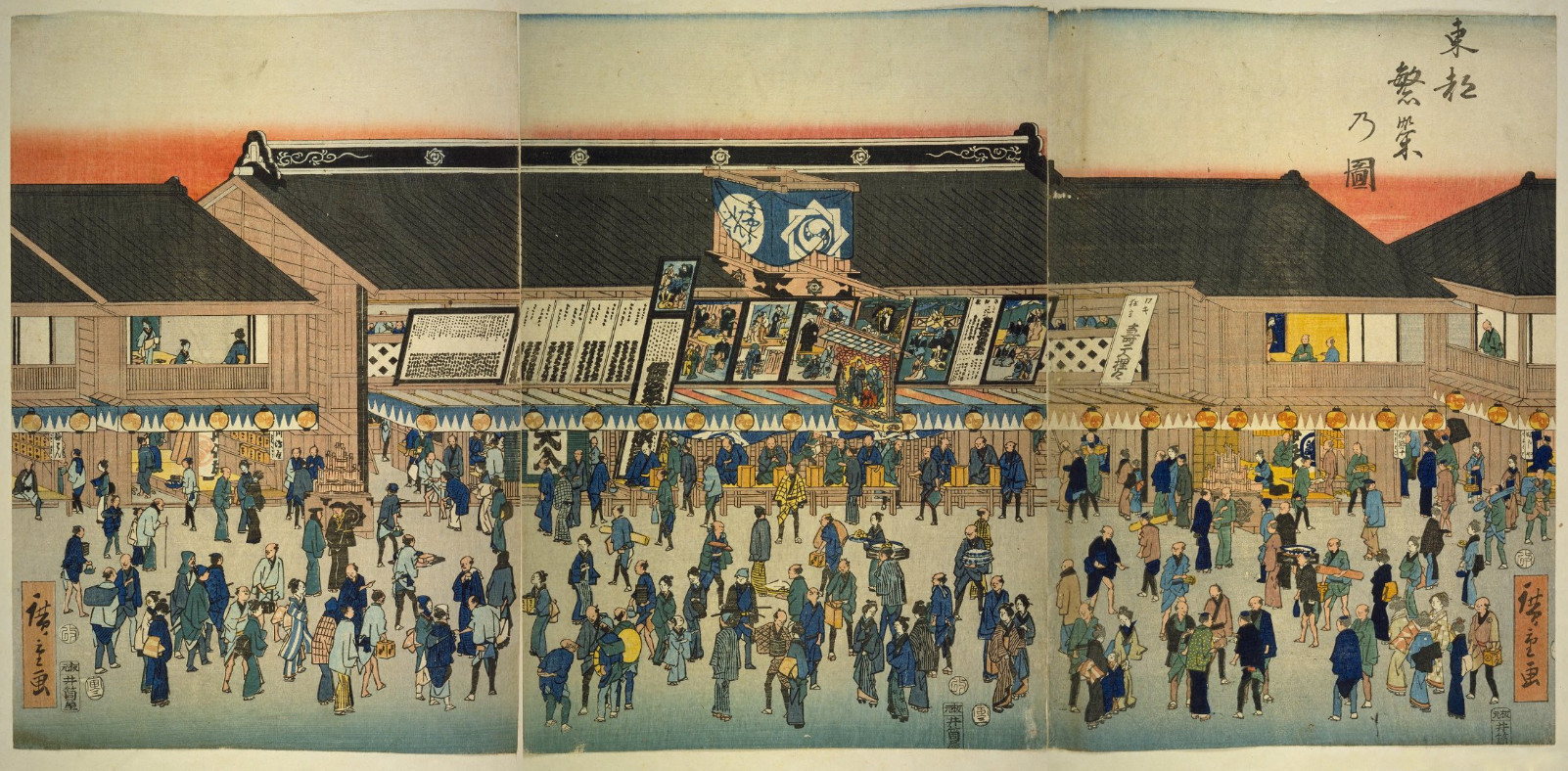
- Kawarazaki-za depicted in 1854
- Address: Edo; Japan
- Owner: Kawarazaki family
- Type: Kabuki theatre

Construction
- Opened: 1656
- Closed: 1877
- Years active: On and off throughout the Edo period

The Kawarazaki-za (河原崎座) was one of the major kabuki theatres in Edo (modern-day Tokyo) during the Edo period and into the Meiji period. Not being one of the four theatres formally licensed by the Tokugawa shogunate, the theatre was largely inactive for long stretches of time, operating only when the Morita-za, facing financial difficulties or physical destruction of its theatre building, temporarily lent its license to the Kawarazaki-za. It was established in 1656 and was managed by members of the Kawarazaki family of actors until 1875.

== History ==
The Kawarazaki-za was opened in 1656 by Kawarazaki Gonnosuke I. In 1670, the shogunate issued licenses to four theatres in the city, forbidding the others, including the Kawarazaki-za, from operating. The Kawarazaki-za was, therefore, largely inactive until 1735, when it obtained the license from the bankrupt Morita-za, losing it once more in 1744.

The theatre then reacquired the Morita-za's license from 1790 to 1797, producing a number of plays including Yoshitsune Senbon Zakura in 1794. The fourth period of operation, from 1800 to 1808, saw performances by the Morita family of actors from the Morita-za. Natsu Matsuri Naniwa Kagami was performed for the first time at the Kawarazaki-za in 1802, featuring a number of actors of the Ichikawa family.

The theatre continued to hold the Morita-za license for much of the 19th century, on and off. A great number of plays premiered at the Kawarazaki-za during this period; one of the most famous was Kanjinchō, featuring the character of Benkei, which premiered in March 1840.

The theatre was destroyed in the 1855 Ansei Edo earthquake, and was not reopened until 1874. In a shūmei (naming ceremony) held at the theatre at that time, actor Kawarazaki Sanshō took on the prestigious name Ichikawa Danjūrō IX, which had not been held for twenty years. The following year, however, the theatre was sold to a group of investors from outside the kabuki families; it was renamed the Shinbori-za and went bankrupt and closed two years later, in 1877.

== Zamoto (head of the theatre) ==
- Kawarazaki Gonnosuke I (1656–1690)
- Kawarazaki Gonnosuke II (1691–1735)
- Kawarazaki Gonnosuke III (1735–1744)
- Kawarazaki Gonnosuke IV (1790–1796)
- Kawarazaki Gonnosuke V (1796–1830)
- Kawarazaki Gonnosuke VI (1830–1855)
- Kawarazaki Gonnosuke VIII (1874–1875)

== Reference and Notes ==
- Kawarazaki-za at Kabuki21.com
