= Shintomiza =

Coordinates: 34°29′46.32″N 136°41′58.39″E

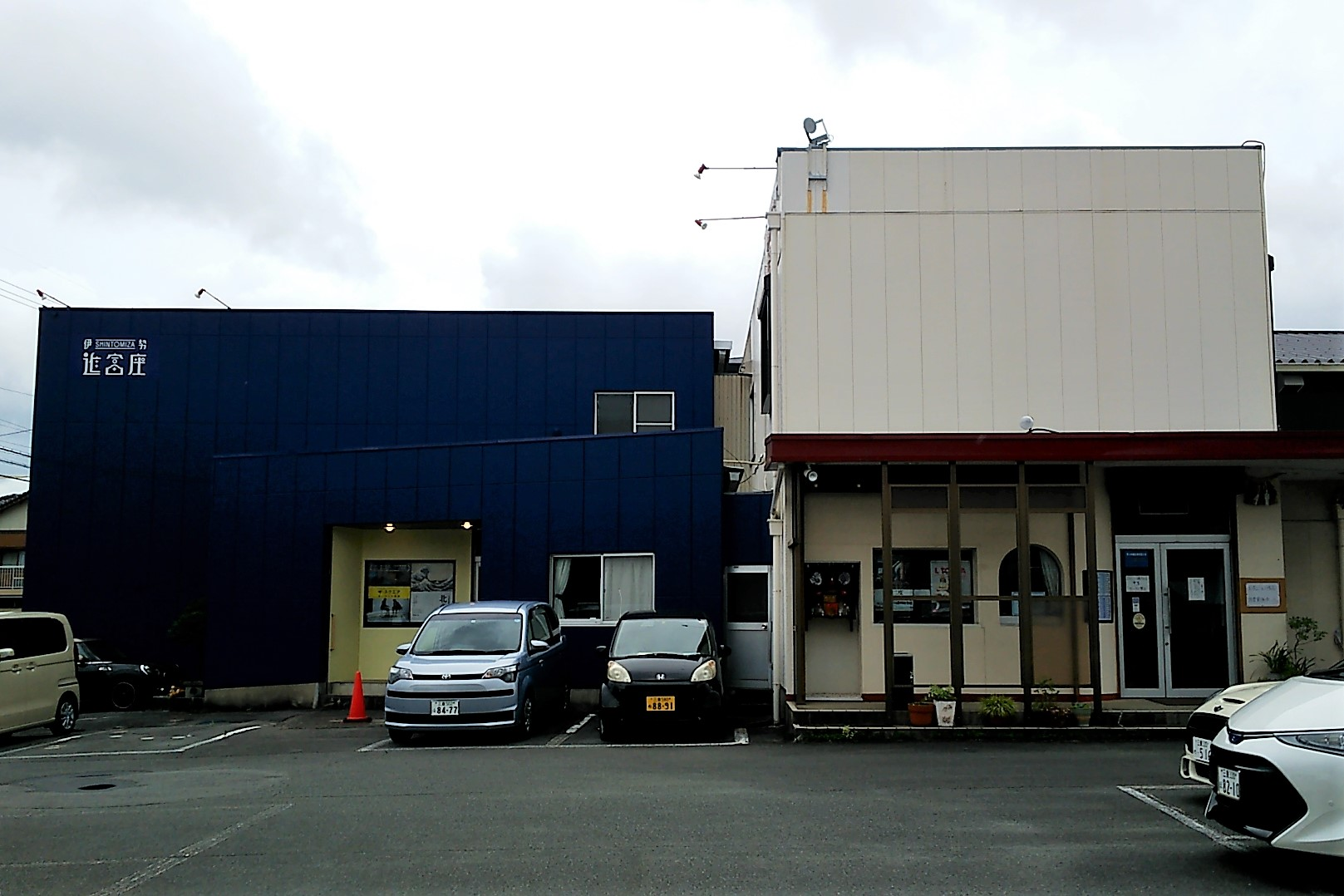
Shintomiza

Shintomiza (進富座) is an independent movie theater in the city of Ise, Mie Prefecture, Japan.

== History ==
It opened under the name Shintomiza (新富座) as a playhouse in Ujiyamada city, Mie Prefecture in 1927. Shintomiza shifted from playhouse to movie theater in 1953. The former name is Shintomi Movie Theater (進富映画劇場) (1953-1956), Ise Toei (伊勢東映) (1956-1983), Rec (レック) (1983-1997), Ise Écrin (伊勢エクラン) (1997-2002). Ise Écrin changed to current name in 2002.

It is one of the only independent movie theaters in Japan that is not located in a major metropolis. Shintomiza has 2 screens.
