= Tsunekichi Shibata =

Japanese filmmaker (1850–1929)

Tsunekichi Shibata (柴田 常吉, Shibata Tsunekichi; 1850 – 1929) was one of Japan's first filmmakers. He worked for the photographer Shirō Asano and the Konishi Camera shop, the first in Japan to import a motion picture camera. Along with Kanzo Shirai, he made the earliest films in Japan, mostly of geisha, Ginza, and selections of scenes from popular plays. His first exhibition was at the Tokyo Kabuki-za, a Kabuki theater, in 1899. After that he focused mainly on Kabuki plays. In 1898, before starting his work with Shirai, he shot five documentary films of street scenes in Tokyo for the Lumière Company, numbers 981–985 in the Lumière catalogue. It appears negatives for these films still exist and one print of #985. If this is true, it would make the documentary work the oldest extant films by a Japanese filmmaker, though not the first films shot in Japan.

In November 1899 Shibata filmed a scene from the Kabuki play Momijigari, starring two of the most famous Kabuki actors of the period, Ichikawa Danjūrō IX and Onoe Kikugorō V. This 3 minute 50 second long film version of Momijigari is the oldest surviving narrative movie filmed in Japan.

== Early works ==
- Armed Robber: Shimizu Sakakichi (not surviving)
- Momijigari starring Ichikawa Danjūrō IX and Onoe Kikugoro V
- Ninjin Dojo (not surviving)
