= Nakamura Kanzaburō =

The ginkgo tree mon of the Nakamura family.

Nakamura Kanzaburō is a stage name taken on by a series of Kabuki actors of the Nakamura family. Most of these were blood relatives, though some were adopted into the family. Kanzaburō, like other actors' names, is bestowed (or given up) at grand naming ceremonies called shūmei in which a number of actors formally change their names. The bearer of the name was often also the zamoto, the head of the troupe and theatre manager, of the Nakamura-za theatre in Edo (now Tokyo).

== Lineage ==
- Nakamura Kanzaburō I (1598 – June 1658) – founder of the Nakamura-za, and among the earliest generation of kabuki actors.
- Nakamura Kanzaburō II (1662 – August 1674) – actor, zamoto and son of Kanzaburō I.
- Nakamura Kanzaburō III (September 1674 – August 1678) – actor, zamoto and son of Kanzaburō I.
- Nakamura Kanzaburō IV (August 1678 – December 1683) – actor, zamoto and son of Nakamura Kankurō I
- Nakamura Kanzaburō V (October 1684 – September 1701) – actor, zamoto, and son of Kanzaburō III.
- Nakamura Kanzaburō VI (October 1701 – July 1750) – zamoto and son of Kankurō I. Rarely appeared on stage.
- Nakamura Kanzaburō VII (August 1750 – February 1775) – zamoto and son of Kankurō I. Rarely appeared on stage.
- Nakamura Kanzaburō VIII (September 1775 – November 1777) – actor, zamoto, son of Kanzaburō VI.
- Nakamura Kanzaburō IX (January 1778 – 29 July 1785) – actor, zamoto, grandson of Nakamura Shichisaburō II, adopted by Kanzaburō VIII.
- Nakamura Kanzaburō X (June 1786 – April 1787) – zamoto, merchant son-in-law of Kanzaburō VIII. Never appeared on stage.
- Nakamura Kanzaburō XI (April 1787 – August 1829) – zamoto son-in-law of Kanzaburō VIII. Rarely appeared on stage.
- Nakamura Kanzaburō XII (November 1829 – March 1850) – actor and zamoto, son of Kanzaburō XI. Arrested for falsification of documents.
- Nakamura Kanzaburō XIII (April 1850 – 1875) – last zamoto of the Nakamura-za. Rarely appeared on stage. Son of Kanzaburō XII.
- Nakamura Nakazō III never formally held the name, but is counted as 14th in the lineage. Actor son-in-law of Kanzaburō XII, managed the Nakamura-za briefly from 1875 to its destruction in 1876.
- Nakamura Akashi V never formally held the name, but is counted as 15th in the lineage. Actor son of Kanzaburō XIII and zamoto of the Saruwaka-za.
- Nakamura Fujiko – likewise never formally held the name, but is counted as 16th in the lineage. Daughter of Akashi V, granddaughter of Kanzaburō XIII.
- Nakamura Kanzaburō XVII (b. 1909; held the name January 1950 – April 1988) – Actor son of Nakamura Karoku III. Took part of first kabuki tour in Western Europe, and in the opening ceremony of the National Theater.
- Nakamura Kanzaburō XVIII (30 May 1955 – 5 December 2012; held the name March 2005 – December 2012) – Actor son of Kanzaburō XVII. Most recent holder of the name. Appeared also in TV commercials and stage musicals and comedies outside of kabuki. Died from esophageal cancer on 5 December 2012.
