= Ichikawa Danjūrō IX =

Japanese actor (1838–1903)

Ichikawa Danjūrō IX 九代目市川團十郎
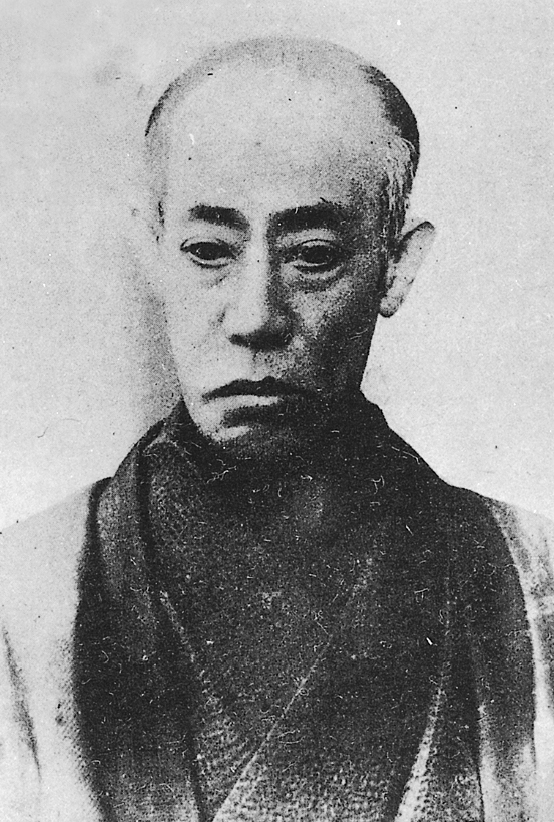
- Born: Hideshi Horikoshi(堀越 秀); 29 November 1838; Sakai-cho district, Edo, Japan
- Died: 13 September 1903 (aged 64); Tokyo, Japan
- Other names: Kawarasaki Sanshō, Kawarasaki Gonnosuke VII, Kawarasaki Gonjūrō I, Kawarasaki Chōjūrō III, Ichikawa Jukai II

Ichikawa Danjūrō IX (九代目 市川 團十郎, Kudaime Ichikawa Danjūrō; 29 November 1838 – 13 September 1903) was one of the most successful and famous Kabuki actors of the Meiji period (1868–1912).

Ninth in the line of actors to hold the name Ichikawa Danjūrō, he is depicted in countless ukiyo-e actor prints (yakusha-e), and is widely credited with ensuring Kabuki stayed vibrant and strong as Japan struggled with modernization and Westernization.

According to Zoë Kincaid,

Danjūrō, the ninth, was the bridge that spanned the sudden gulf which yawned between the traditional past and the uncertain and changing modern world. He may be regarded as the saviour of Kabuki during a period when it might have suffered shipwreck, had there not been a man of genius at the helm to guide the craft through the troubled waters.

== Names ==
Like most Kabuki actors, Danjūrō IX was called by a number of different stage names at different points in his career. "Ichikawa Danjūrō" is traditionally a name earned at the climax of one's career, and kept until retirement. Prior to being granted that name, he was known as Kawarasaki Sanshō, Kawarasaki Gonnosuke VII, Kawarasaki Gonjūrō I, Kawarasaki Chōjūrō III, and Ichikawa Jukai II.

== Lineage ==
Fifth son of Ichikawa Danjūrō VII, Danjūrō was a direct descendant of the first to hold the name Ichikawa Danjūrō. He had six brothers in Kabuki: Danjūrō VIII, Ebizō VII, Ebizō VIII, Ichikawa Komazō VI, Ichikawa Saruzō I, and Ichikawa Kōzō. He was adopted by Kawarazaki Gonnosuke VI, and was the father-in-law of Ichikawa Danjūrō X. Danjuro had two daughters, Ichikawa Suisen II and Ichikawa Kyokubai II, and a granddaughter, Ichikawa Suisen III. Though women were banned from performing in kabuki, they took part in the theater, playing very minor roles and as stagehands.

== Life and career ==
Born in 1838, in Edo's Sakai district, the fifth son of Ichikawa Danjūrō VII, his parents were not legally married. He was adopted by Kawarasaki Gonnosuke VI, the head of the Kawarazaki-za theater, where he would begin his acting career. His debut was in January 1845, at the age of seven, and he was given the name Kawarasaki Chōjūrō III. Just over ten years later, in October 1855, the Kawarasaki-za and much of the city of Edo was destroyed in the Ansei earthquake. Now known as Kawarasaki Gonjūrō I, the actor began performing at the Ichimura-za. There, he would play Benkei for the first time in July 1859, a few months after the death of his biological father.

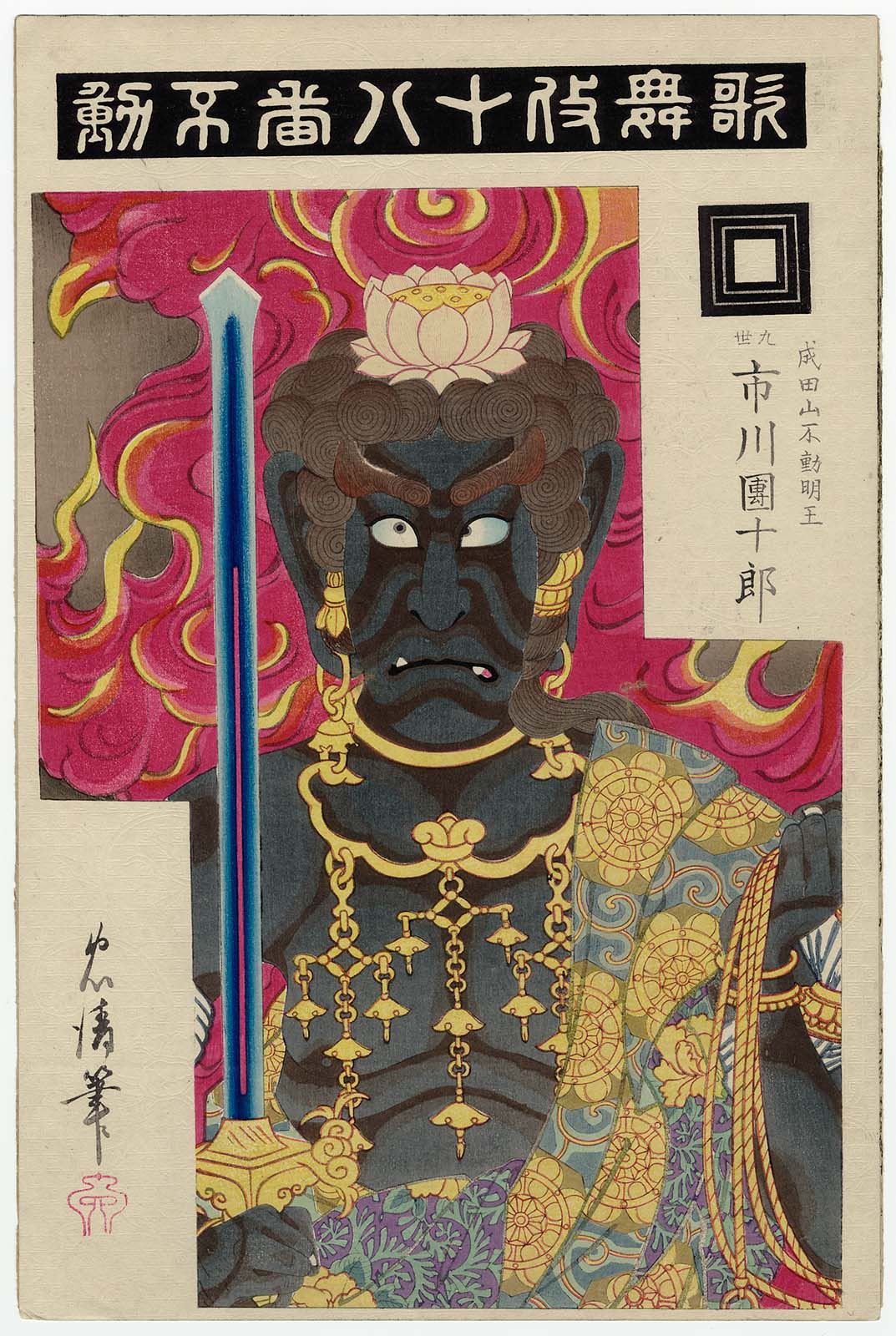
Fudō: Ichikawa Danjūrō IX as Narita-san Fudō Myōō by Tadakiyo (Hasegawa Kanbee XIV)

Gonjūrō continued performing at the Ichimura-za for many years. In September 1868, his adoptive father was killed by a thief; Gonjūrō would become head (zagashira) of the theater the following year, taking his murdered father's name, and becoming Kawarasaki Gonnosuke VII. Later that year, Gonnosuke would play the leading role of Katō Kiyomasa in Momoyama Monogatari. This play was an early predecessor of an experimental form which would come to be called katsureki (活歴). Gonnosuke would later seek to develop and popularize katsureki plays, which sought to reproduce historical events as accurately as possible. In 1874, Gonnosuke, now known as Kawarasaki Sanshō, began managing and performing once more at the now-rebuilt and reopened Kawarasaki-za. At the reopening ceremony, or perhaps shortly afterwards, he took the honored name Ichikawa Danjūrō IX, which had not been held for twenty years. Danjūrō gave up managing the following year, however, and toured for six years in the provinces of Kozuke and Shimotsuke.

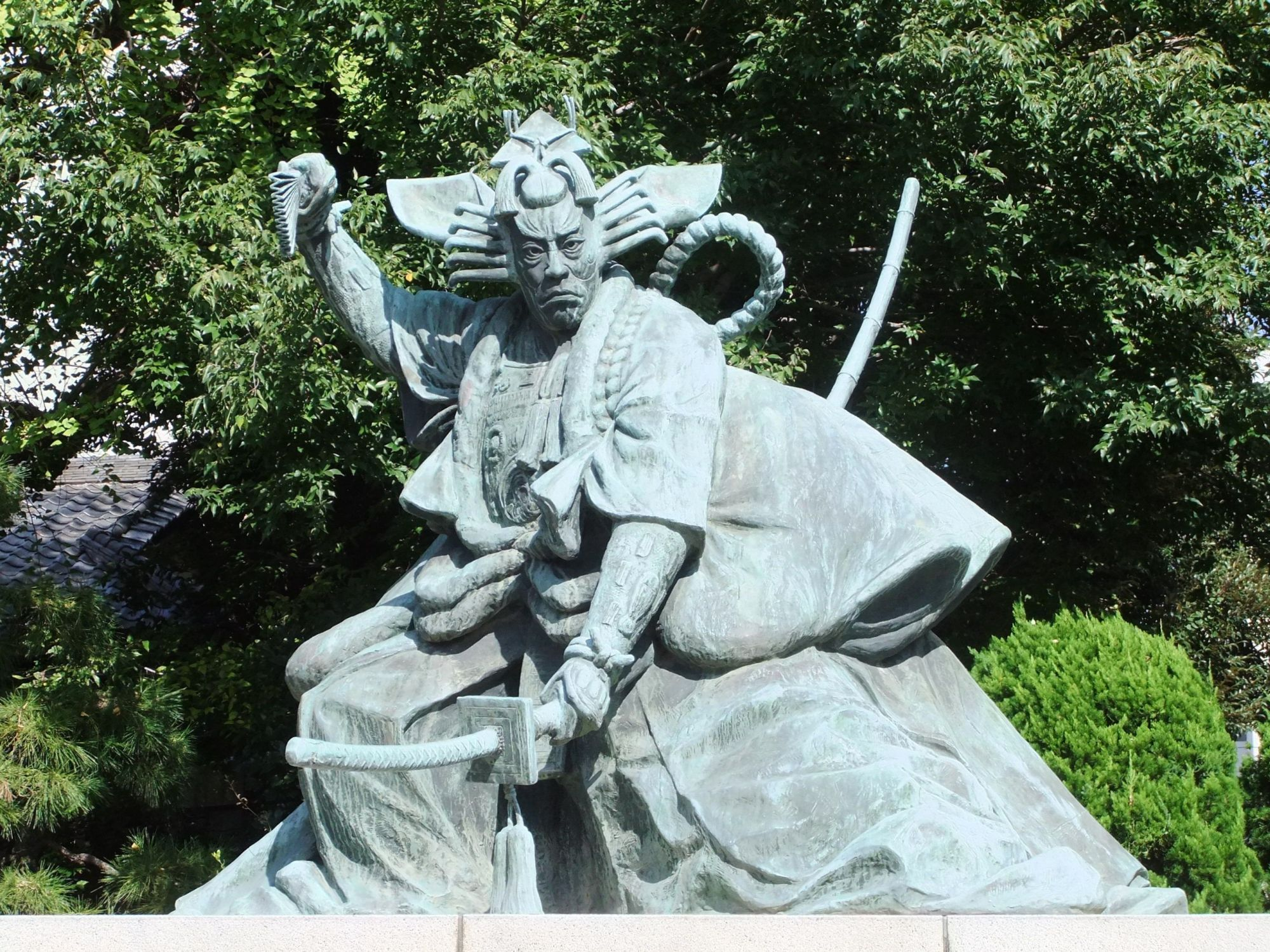
Statue of Ichikawa Danjuro IX in Sensō-ji

He returned to Edo (now Tokyo) in 1881, and performed for Emperor Meiji at the house of the Minister for Foreign Affairs, along with the celebrated actors Onoe Kikugorō V and Ichikawa Sadanji I, in April 1887. Two years later, in November 1889, he became zagashira (head) of the newly opened Kabuki-za, which is today the principal Kabuki theater in Japan. Unquestionably one of the top actors of the time, Danjūrō performed in the premieres of many plays at the Kabuki-za, and took part in a number of other events of import. By this point, he also had his daughters performing on stage, as kuroko (stagehands) and in very minor roles. In 1893, he performed at the grand opening ceremonies for the Meiji-za theater.

Along with Onoe Kikugorō V, he was very likely the first kabuki actor to appear in a film. Momijigari (Maple Leaf Viewing) was filmed in November 1899, and is the oldest surviving example of Japanese filmmaking. Danjūrō had nothing but contempt for film, denigrating it as a foreign invention, but was eventually convinced that a film of his act would be a gift to posterity. He only agreed to be filmed on the condition that it would not be seen by anyone until after his death. The play was filmed by Shibata Tsunekichi in the open air on a windy day, and Danjūrō allowed only one take.

Danjūrō would play Benkei for the last time in April 1899, and made his final appearance on stage in May 1903. He died, in Tokyo, in September of that year. His grave is at Aoyama Cemetery.

Danjūrō had many disciples, including Matsumoto Kōshirō VII, Ichikawa Monnosuke VI, Ichikawa Chūsha VII, Ichikawa Shinzō V, Ichikawa Gangyoku II, Ichikawa Raizō V, Ichikawa Gonjūrō, Ichikawa Sumizō V, Ichikawa Dan'emon I, Ichikawa Dan'emon II, Ichikawa Shōzō III, Ichikawa Shinjūrō II, Ichikawa Shinjūrô III, and Ichikawa Danshirō II.

== See also ==
The Ichikawa family crest (mon)

- Shūmei
