= Momijigari (film) =

- Directed by: Shibata Tsunekichi
- Starring: Onoe Kikugorō V, Ichikawa Danjūrō IX
- Release date: 1903
- Running time: 3 min. 50 sec. (at 16 fps)
- Country: Japan
- Language: Silent

Momijigari (紅葉狩; a.k.a. Viewing Scarlet Maple Leaves, Maple Leaf Viewing, or Maple Viewing) is a Japanese short film shot in early 1899 by Shibata Tsunekichi. It is a record of the kabuki actors Onoe Kikugorō V and Ichikawa Danjūrō IX performing a scene from the kabuki play Momijigari. It is the oldest extant Japanese film and the first film to be designated an Important Cultural Property.

== Film content ==
The film features the scene in which Taira no Koremochi (平維茂) defeats Momiji, a kijo who has disguised herself as Princess Sarashina.

== Production and exhibition ==
Momijigari was planned primarily as a record of the performance of the two famous actors. Shibata, who worked for the Konishi Photographic Store, shot it using a Gaumont camera. It was filmed in November 1899 in an open space behind the Kabuki-za in Tokyo, with Shibata using three reels of film. It was a windy day, however, and a gust blew away one of Danjūrō's fans, a mishap that remained in the film since retakes were not possible.

Since the film was meant only as a record, it was not initially shown publicly. Danjūrō only saw it himself a year after it was filmed. There was an agreement that it would not be screened for the public until after Danjūrō's death, but when he fell ill and could not appear at a performance at the Naka-za in Osaka, it was screened in his place. It ran from 7 July to 1 August 1903, a long run spurred in part by the fact that Kikugorō had recently died. Danjūrō himself died in September 1903, and the film showed at the Kabuki-za after that, for one week starting on 9 February 1904.

== Legacy ==
Barring the discovery of another film, Momijigari is the oldest Japanese-made film for which a print still exists. Kabuki actor Onoe Baiko VI stated in his book Ume No Shita Kaze that a test movie of the dance drama Ninjin Dojo-ji, starring himself and fellow actor Ichimura Kakitsu VI (later Ichimura Uzaemon XV), was shot months before but it probably got lost before 1912. It is also an early example of the kind of "kabuki cinema" that would become prominent in the first decades of the Japanese film industry, in which films were often records of or attempts to reproduce kabuki theater. According to the film historian Hiroshi Komatsu, it is also an example of how the distinction between fiction and non-fiction cinema was not yet an issue at the time, since the film was both a documentary of a stage performance and a presentation of a fictional story.

In 2009, Momijigari became the first film to be designated an Important Cultural Property under Japan's Law for the Protection for Cultural Properties. What has specifically received that designation is a dupe negative 35mm celluloid print of the film that is 352 feet (107 m) in length, which if projected at 16 frames per second would be 3 minutes and 50 seconds long. The film historian Aaron Gerow, however, has speculated that the film received this designation less because it was an example of the legacy of Japanese film art than because it was a historical document. The print is preserved at the National Film Center of the National Museum of Modern Art, Tokyo.
