= Morita-za =

- 森田座
- Morita-za (守田座), Shintomi-za
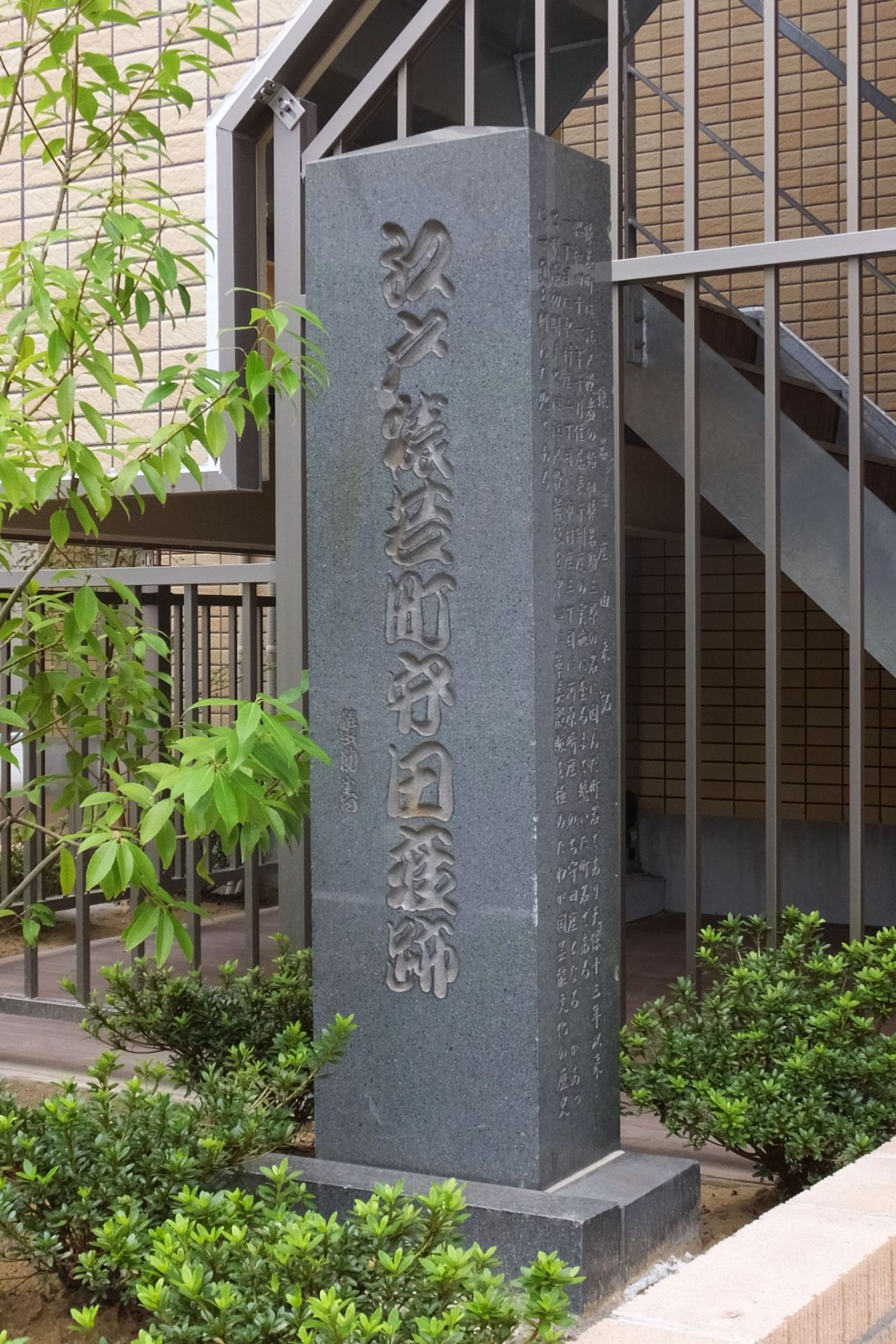
- Stele of Saruwaka-machi Morita-za in Asakusa
- Address: Edo; Japan
- Owner: Morita family, later Shōchiku
- Type: Kabuki theatre
- Designation: Licensed theatre

Construction
- Opened: January 1660
- Closed: 1923
- Rebuilt: 1704, numerous other times

The Morita-za (森田座・守田座), also known later as the Shintomi-za (新富座), was one of the major Kabuki theaters in Edo (modern-day Tokyo) during the Edo period and into the beginning of the 20th century. It was established in January 1660, and run by the Morita family of actors until its destruction in the 1923 Great Kantō earthquake which destroyed much of Tokyo.

== History ==
The Morita-za was first built by Morita Tarōbei I and his son Morita Tashichi in 1660, in Edo's Kobiki-chō district. The theater would burn down only a few months later, and many more times over the years, but was always rebuilt (until 1923). It was designated as one of only four theaters allowed to operate in Edo, by a 1670 government edict; the other three officially designated theaters were the Nakamura-za, Ichimura-Takenojō-za, and Yamamura-za. After all four were destroyed in the 1703 Great Genroku fire, and rebuilt, there began a tradition of co-producing plays for New Year's celebrations.

The Morita-za experienced great success for a time and took part in a number of major events along with the other three top theaters; for example, in 1717, Chikamatsu's Battles of Coxinga, performed at the Morita-za and two other theaters, was the first instance of a bunraku puppet play being adapted to kabuki.

However, in 1734, the Morita-za went bankrupt, and was forced to transfer the rights to its performances to another theatre, through the hikae yagura system. Kawarazaki Gonnosuke III of the Kawarazaki-za, took over the Morita-za's place as a designated theater for a decade or so. This relationship between the two theaters would continue through the Edo period, as the Morita-za went bankrupt numerous times in the late 18th and early 19th centuries.

Though on shaky ground in terms of financial stability, the Morita-za would see a great number of significant kabuki events over the following decades, including the introductory performances of many now-famous plays, and other such special occasions. In 1781, Ichikawa Danzō IV, performing at the Morita-za, became the first performer to take on seven roles in the grand epic Chushingura (The Tale of the 47 Ronin).

In 1858, after a number of closings and reopenings of the theater, the Morita-za opened once more, changing its name, however, from 「森田座」 to 「守田座」 (both are pronounced the same, as "Morita-za"). The character 守 (mori) means "protection", and this change was perhaps made to seek better luck for the theater, and protection from fire and from bankruptcy. The theater would then be moved and rebuilt in 1872, leaving Saruwaka-chō for Shintomi-chō; the new building was larger, and had a few new features, such as indoor toilets and a seating section for foreigners. A few years later, in 1875, the theater was renamed Shintomi-za, after the district, in celebration and recognition of its becoming a stock company (sogo shosha).

Though the theater would continue to be destroyed by fire, and to face financial difficulties, it continued to improve and to experiment. The Shintomi-za would be rebuilt bigger and better several times in the late 19th century, and experimented with new styles of productions. In September 1879, it premiered a play called Hyōryū Kidan Seiyō Kabuki (漂流気団西洋歌舞伎, "A strange story about drifters and Western Kabuki"); the story was one of Japanese exploring Europe and the United States, and featured a number of Western actors, and Italian-style arias. It was not well-received, and was a commercial failure in this first performance, but is representative of the kinds of experimentation and innovation that the Shintomi-za explored.

Morita Kanya XII, then head of the theater (zamoto) was forced to hand over official management duties in 1894, due to financial problems, but stayed on as producer until his death three years later. In 1909, the theater was bought out by the Shōchiku Corporation, though it continued to be managed by members of the Morita family.

Finally, in 1923, the Great Kantō earthquake destroyed much of the capital, including the Shintomi-za, which was never rebuilt.
