= Onoe Kikugorō III =

Japanese actor (1784–1849)

Onoe Kikugorō III 三代目 尾上 菊五郎
- Born: 1784; Edo, Japan
- Died: 16 May 1849 (aged 64–65); Kakegawa, Shizuoka, Japan
- Other names: Otowa-ya, Ōgawa Hashizō I, Onoe Baikō III, Onoe Matsusuke II, Onoe Eizaburō I, Onoe Baiju, Baiju Kikugorō

Onoe Kikugorō III (三代目 尾上 菊五郎, Sandaime Onoe Kikugorō; Japanese pronunciation: [o.no.e (|) kʲi̥.kɯ.ɡo.ɾoː, -ŋo.ɾoː], 1784 – 16 May 1849) was a Japanese kabuki actor, the first and among the most famous kaneru yakusha, a type of actor who performs a wide variety of roles. This is in contrast to the vast majority of kabuki actors, who specialize in only playing women, heroes, villains, or other particular types of roles. Kikugorō was close friends with the playwright Tsuruya Nanboku IV, who wrote the role of Oiwa, in the play Tōkaidō Yotsuya Kaidan, specifically for him.

== Names and lineage ==
Like most kabuki actors, Kikugorō went by a number of different stage names over the course of his career. He debuted as Onoe Eizaburō I, and spent time as Ōgawa Hashizō I, Onoe Baikō III, and Onoe Matsusuke II, before taking the name Onoe Kikugorō in 1815. He also used the poetry names (haimyō) Baiju, Gachō, Sanchō, and Baikō.

Kikugorō was adopted into the kabuki world by Onoe Shōroku I. He had three sons, Onoe Matsusuke III, Onoe Eizaburō IV, and Onoe Kikunosuke, and a grandson, Onoe Kikugorō V. Onoe Kikugorō IV and Ichimura Uzaemon XII were his sons-in-law.

== Career ==
Kikugorō made his debut on stage at the age of four in 1789, as Onoe Eizaburō I.

By 1810, he had already become acquainted with Tsuruya Nanboku IV, and had seen his first son's stage debut. Over the course of his career, he would develop a strong relationship with the playwright, performing in many of his productions, often alongside his own sons. Taking part in a number of shūmei naming ceremonies alongside his sons, the actor went through several different names, often passing them on to his sons, and finally taking the name Kikugorō III in 1815.

Kikugorō played the lead role of Oiwa, wife of Iemon, in the 1825 premiere of the now-famous ghost play Tōkaidō Yotsuya Kaidan; the role was written specifically for him by his playwright friend. Among his many roles over his career were those of Ōboshi Yuranosuke, Kō no Moronao and Tonase in Kanadeon Chūshingura, Sugawara no Michizane in Sugawara Denju Tenarai Kagami, and Shizuka Gozen and Itami Gonta in Yoshitsune Senbon Zakura. His rivalry with fellow actor Ichikawa Danjūrō VII added to the excitement and appeal of their many performances together.

He entered retirement in September 1847, after a final performance at the Ichimura-za, in a program called "Onoe Baiju Ichidai Banashi" after him. In his retirement, he took on the name Kikuya Manbei, and ran a mochi shop called the Kiku-ya. Kikugorō returned to the stage, however, the following year, performing under the stage name Ōgawa Hashizō I, in Edo and on a short tour in Nagoya.

Settling in Osaka towards the end of 1848, he fell ill the following year and died at the Kakegawa station on the Tōkaidō post road.

== In popular culture ==
- In the 2024 film Hakkenden: Fiction And Reality, Kikugorō III is played by popular Kabuki actor Onoe Ukon II (who is Kikugorō III's great-great-great-great-grandson in real life). In the film, Kikugorō III (played by Ukon II) appears playing two of the most famous and prestigious roles in Kabuki theater: the onnagata role of Oiwa from Yotsuya Kaidan and the tachiyaku role of Ōboshi Yuranosuke from Kanadehon Chūshingura.
