= Zamoto =

Manager of a kabuki theatre

A zamoto (座元) is a manager of a kabuki theatre. Historically, the zamoto owned the theatre and was responsible for obtaining performance rights from the shōgun.

Typically the zamoto was often the latest son of the hereditary owners, such as at the Nakamura-za, Morita-za and Ichimura-za.
