= Nakamura-za =

- 中村座
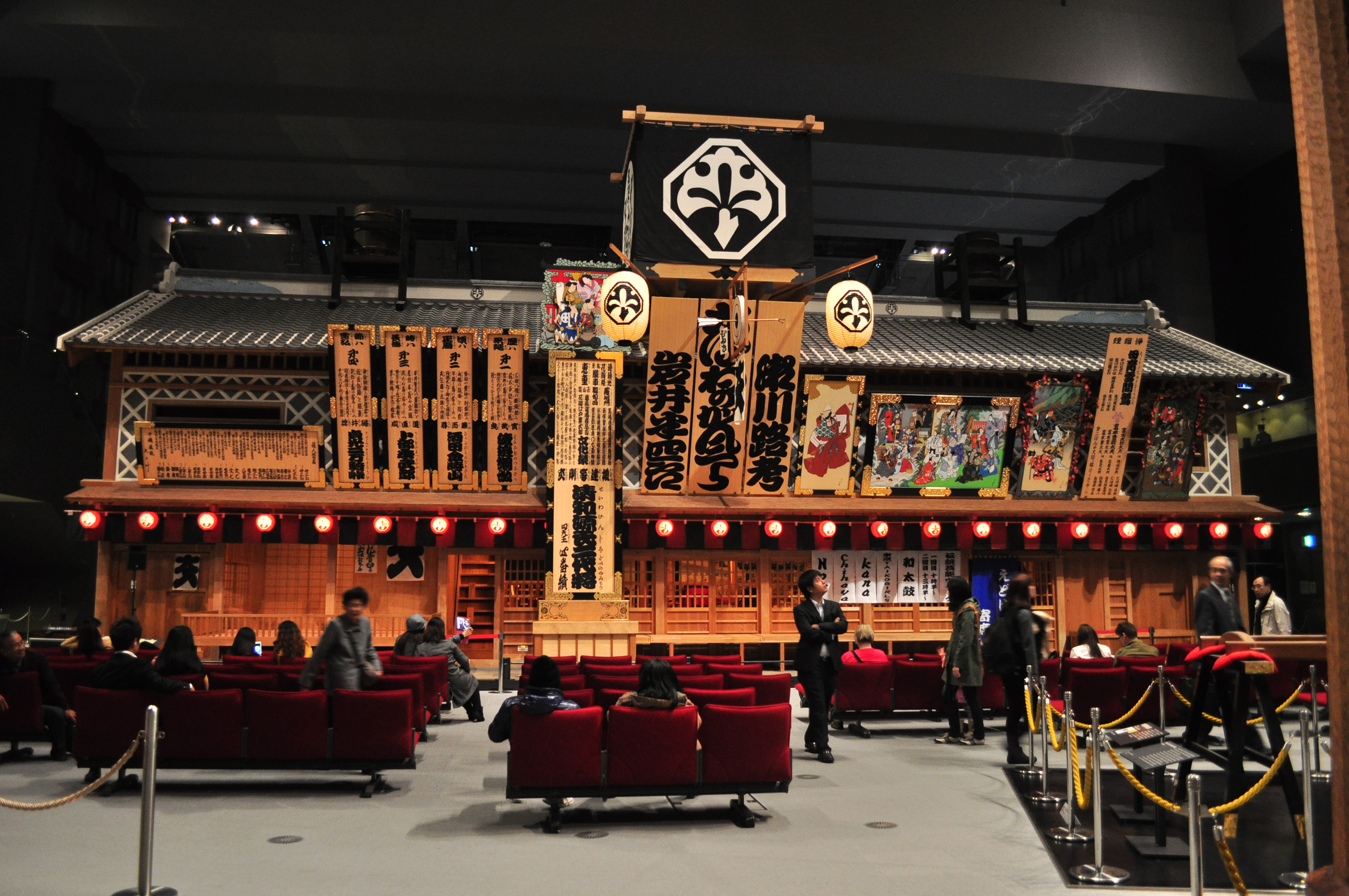
- Replica of the Nakamura-za at the Edo-Tokyo Museum
- Address: Nakahashi, Nihonbashi; Tokyo; Japan
- Type: Kabuki theater

Construction
- Opened: 21 November 1624
- Closed: 22 January 1893
- Years active: 269

Nakamura-za (中村座) was one of the three main kabuki theatres of Edo alongside the Morita-za and Ichimura-za.

== History ==
It was founded in 1624 by Nakamura Kanzaburō 1st. The Nakamura-za relocated to the new capital Tokyo in 1868 and reopened under Nakamura Kanzaburō I's last direct descendant Nakamura Kanzaburo XIII (1828–1895) as zamoto. It was later also called the Miyako-za (都座).

A real-size replica of the Nakamura-za is located at the Edo-Tokyo Museum.
