= Kabuki-za =

Theater in Tokyo

- 歌舞伎座
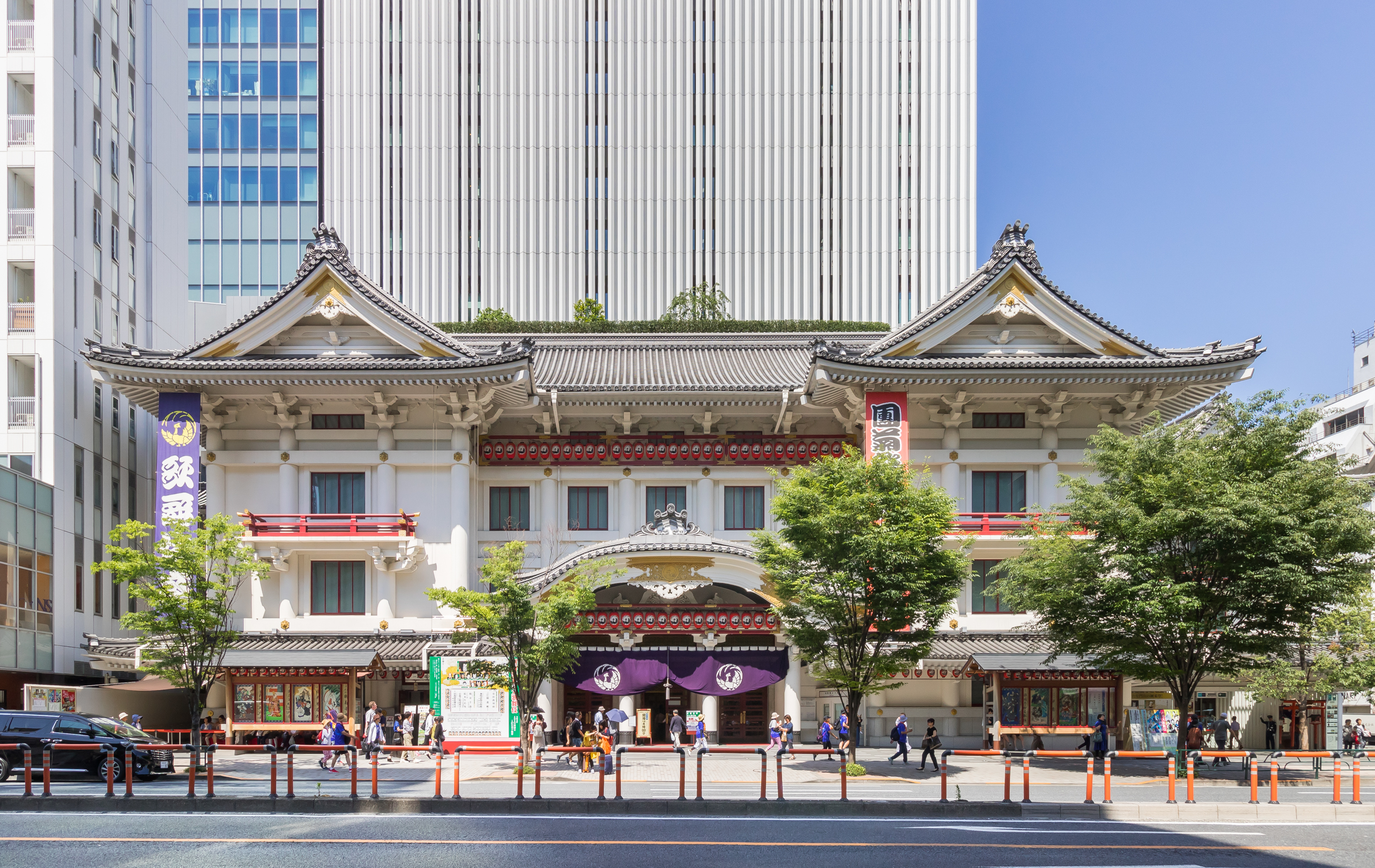
- Kabuki-za, Tokyo's premier kabuki theater
- Interactive map of Kabuki-za
- Address: 東京都中央区銀座四丁目12番15号; 4-12-15 Ginza, Chūō-ku; Tokyo; Japan
- Coordinates: 35°40′11″N 139°46′05″E
- Owner: Kabuki-za Theatrical Corporation
- Operator: Shochiku
- Capacity: 1,964
- Type: Kabuki theater

Construction
- Opened: 21 November 1889
- Rebuilt: 1911, Tashichi Kashiwagi; 1924, Shin'ichirō Okata; 1950, Isoya Yoshida; 2013, Kengo Kuma

Website
- http://www.kabuki-za.co.jp/

Kabuki-za (歌舞伎座) in Ginza is the principal theater in Tokyo for the traditional kabuki drama form.

== History ==
The Kabuki-za was originally opened by a Meiji era journalist, Fukuchi Gen'ichirō. Fukuchi wrote kabuki dramas in which Ichikawa Danjūrō IX and others starred; upon Danjūrō's death in 1903, Fukuchi retired from the management of the theater. The theater is now run by the Shochiku Corporation which took over in 1914.

The original Kabuki-za was a wooden structure, built in 1889 on land which had been either the Tokyo residence of the Hosokawa clan of Kumamoto, or that of Matsudaira clan of Izu.

The building was destroyed on 30 October 1921, by an electrical fire. The reconstruction, which commenced in 1922, was designed to "be fireproof, yet carry traditional Japanese architectural styles", while using Western building materials and lighting equipment. Reconstruction had not been completed when it again burned down during the 1923 Great Kantō earthquake. Rebuilding was finally completed in 1924.

The theater was destroyed once again by Allied bombing during World War II. It was restored in 1950 preserving the style of the 1924 reconstruction, and was until recently one of Tokyo's more dramatic and traditional buildings.

The 1950 structure was demolished in the spring of 2010, and rebuilt over the ensuing three years. Reasons cited for the reconstruction include concerns over the building's ability to survive earthquakes, as well as accessibility issues. A series of farewell performances, entitled Kabuki-za Sayonara Kōen (歌舞伎座さよなら公演, "Kabuki-za Farewell Performances") were held from January through April 2010, after which kabuki performances took place at the nearby Shinbashi Enbujō and elsewhere until the opening of the new theatre complex, which took place on 28 March 2013.

== Architecture ==
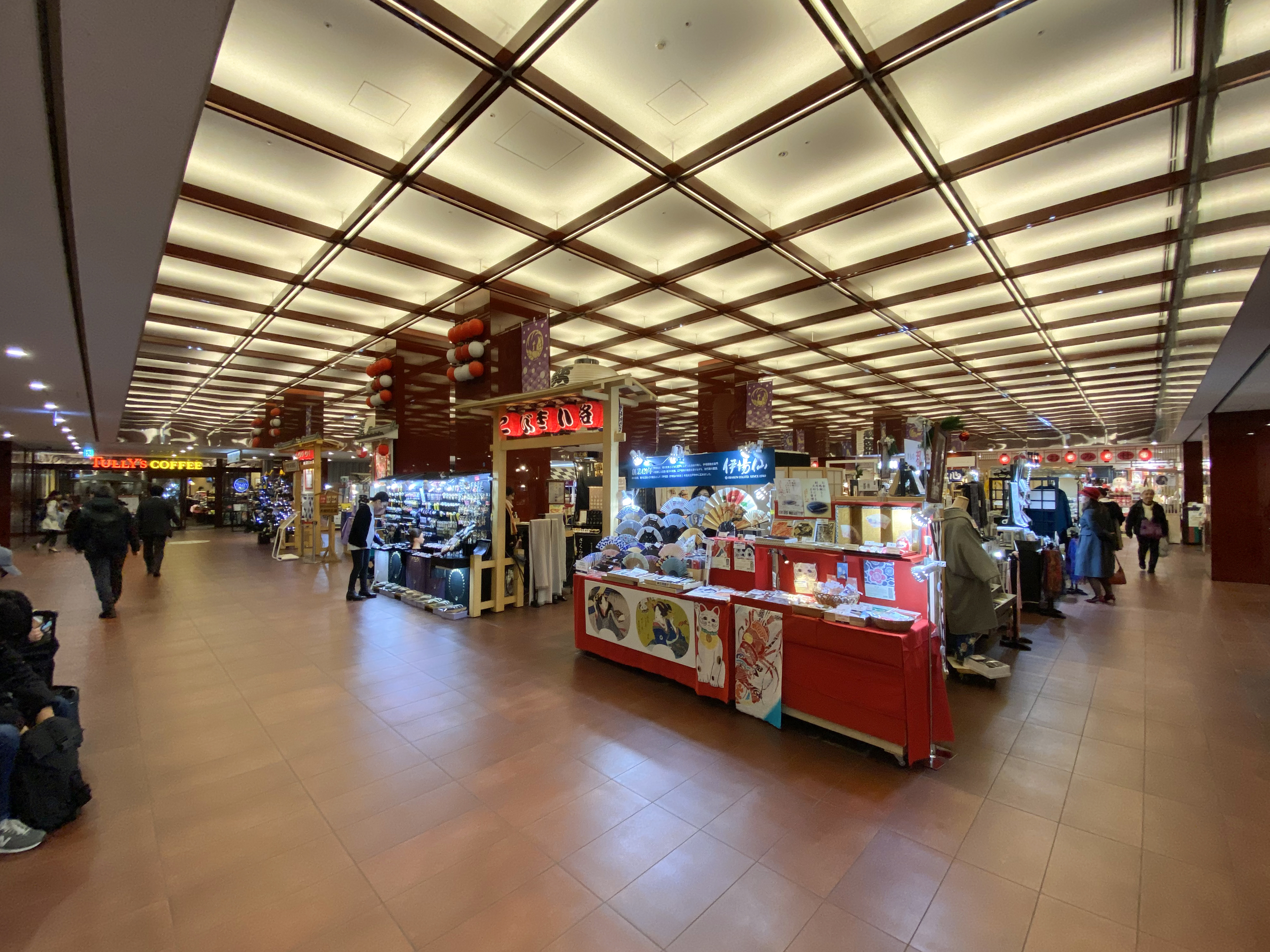
Shops in basement

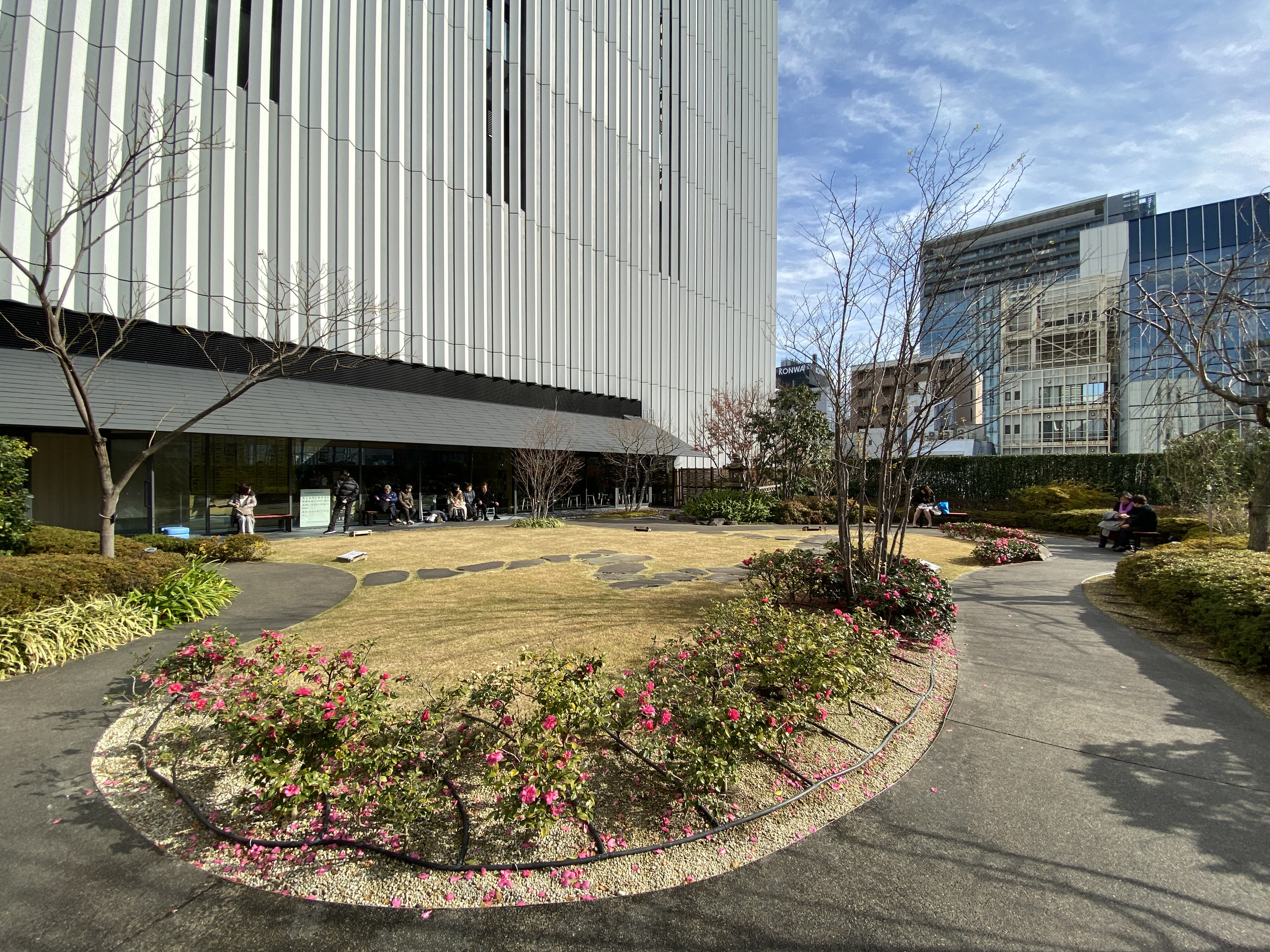
Level 5 Roof garden

The style in 1924 was in a baroque Japanese revivalist style, meant to evoke the architectural details of Japanese castles, as well as temples of pre-Edo period. This style was kept after the post-war reconstruction and again after the 2013 reconstruction.

Inside, with the latest reconstruction the theatre was outfitted with four new front curtains called doncho. These are by renowned Japanese artists in the Nihonga style and reflect the different seasons.

== Performances ==
Performances are exclusively run by Shochiku, in which the Kabuki-za Theatrical Corporation is the largest shareholder. They are nearly every day, and tickets are sold for individual acts as well as for each play in its entirety. As is the case for most kabuki venues, programs are organized monthly: each month there is a given set of plays and dances that make up the afternoon performance, and a different set comprising the evening show. These are repeated on a nearly daily schedule for three to four weeks, with the new month bringing a new program.

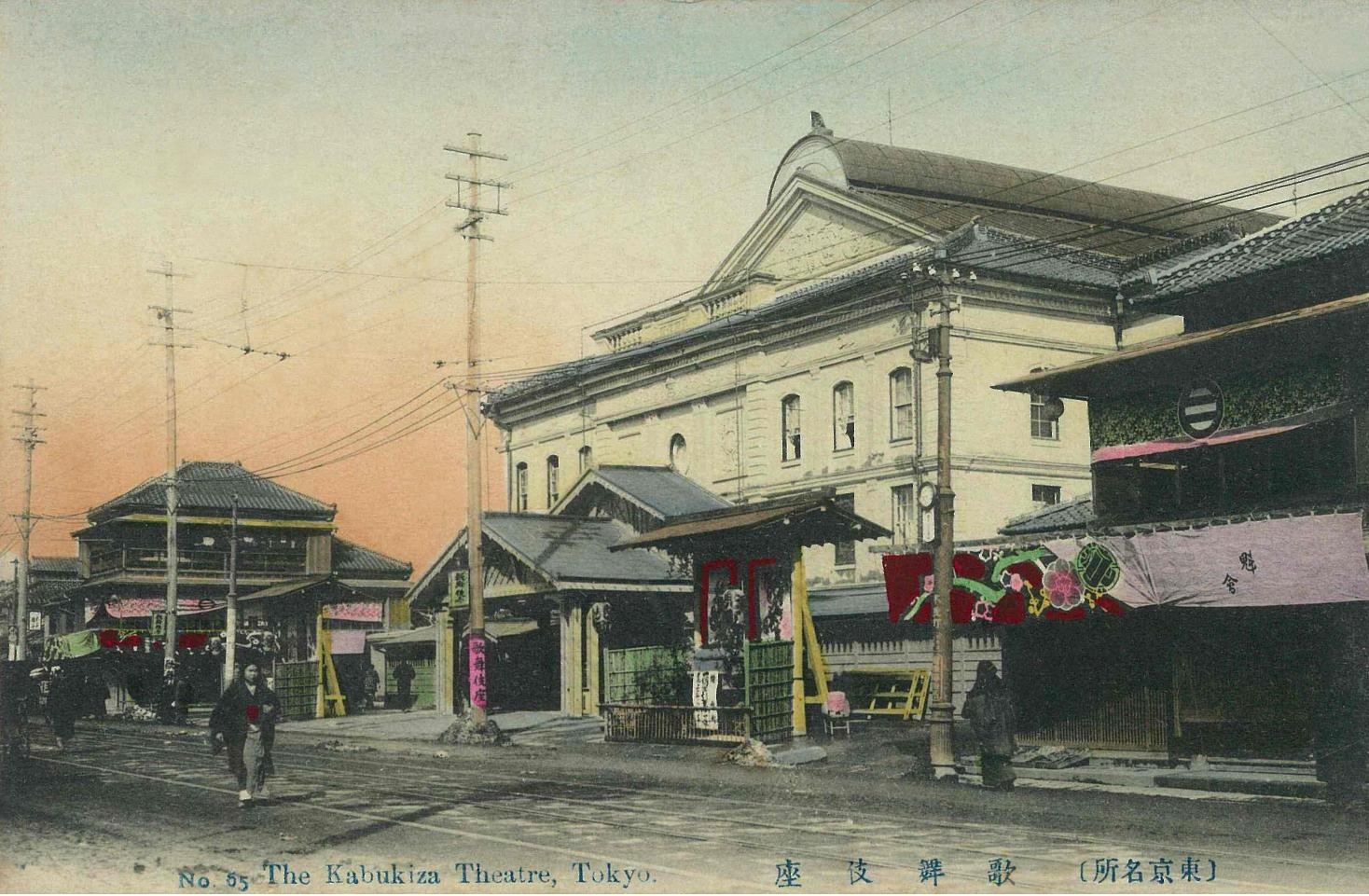
Postcard depicting the original structure (1889-1911)

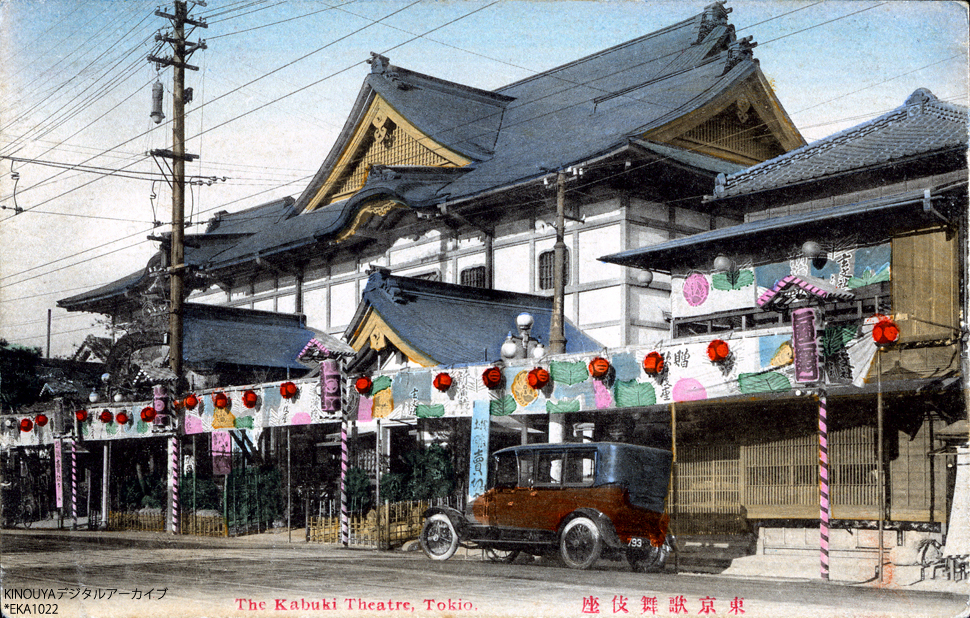
Postcard depicting the theatre as rebuilt in 1911 (1911-1921)

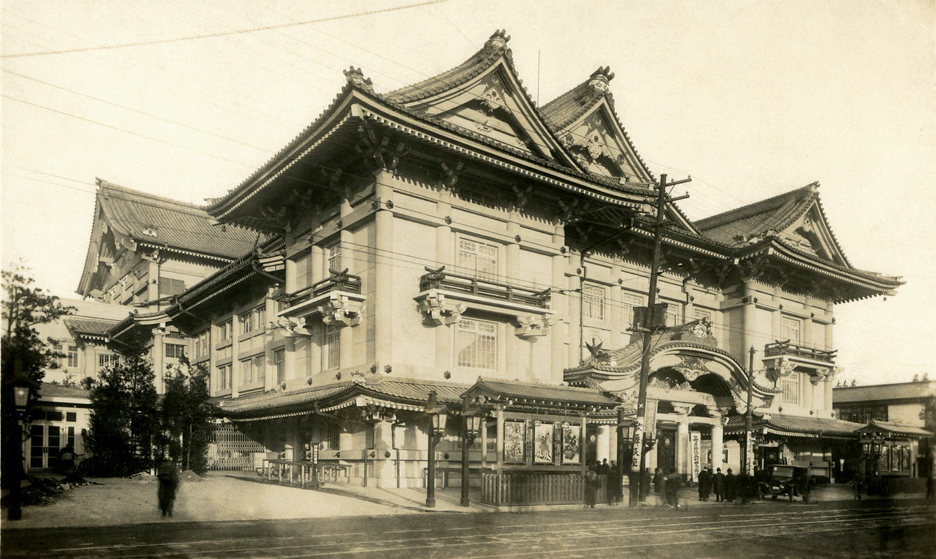
Postcard depicting the pre-war reconstructed theatre (1924-1945)

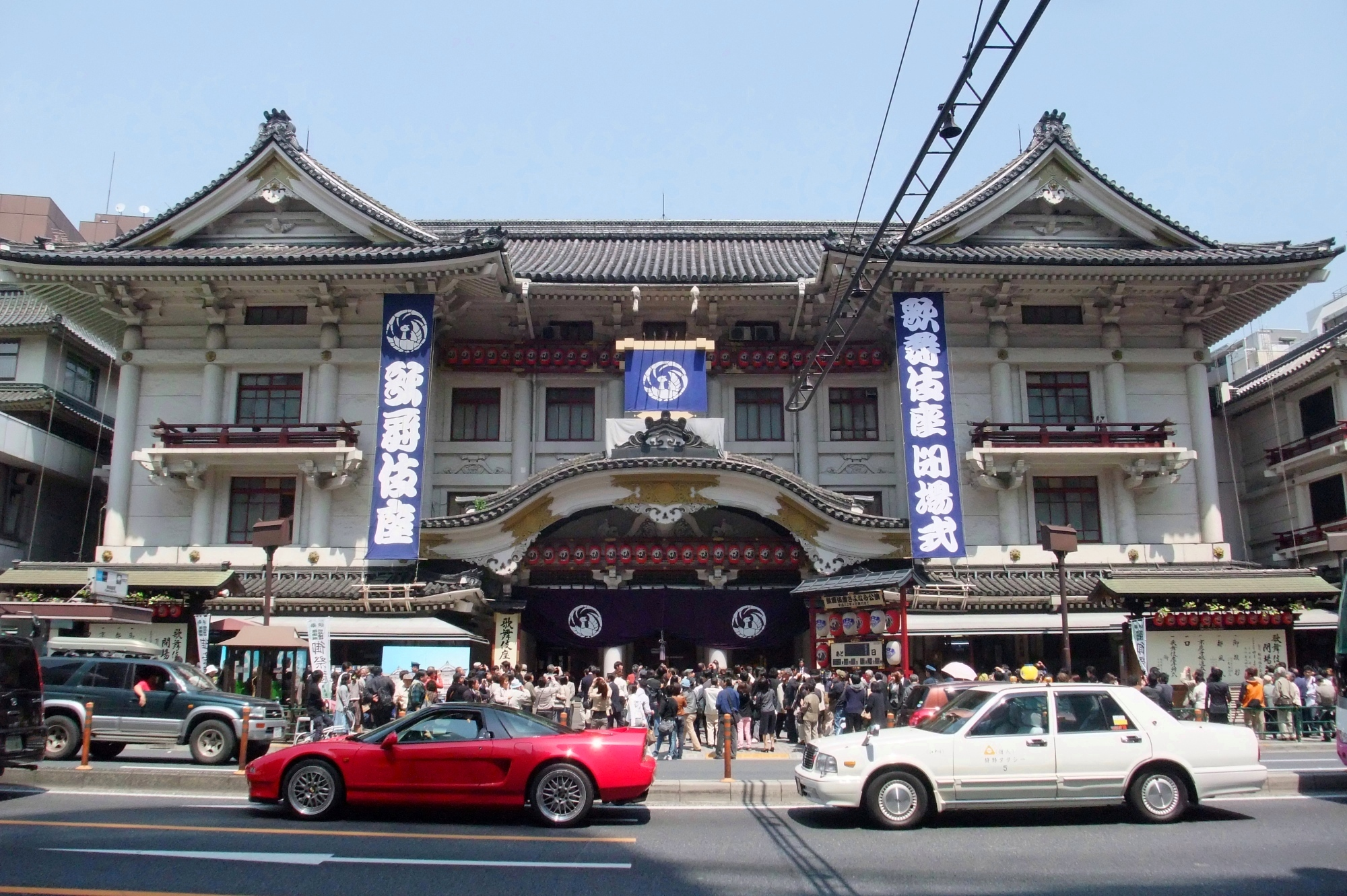
Photo of the post-war reconstructed theatre (1950-2010)

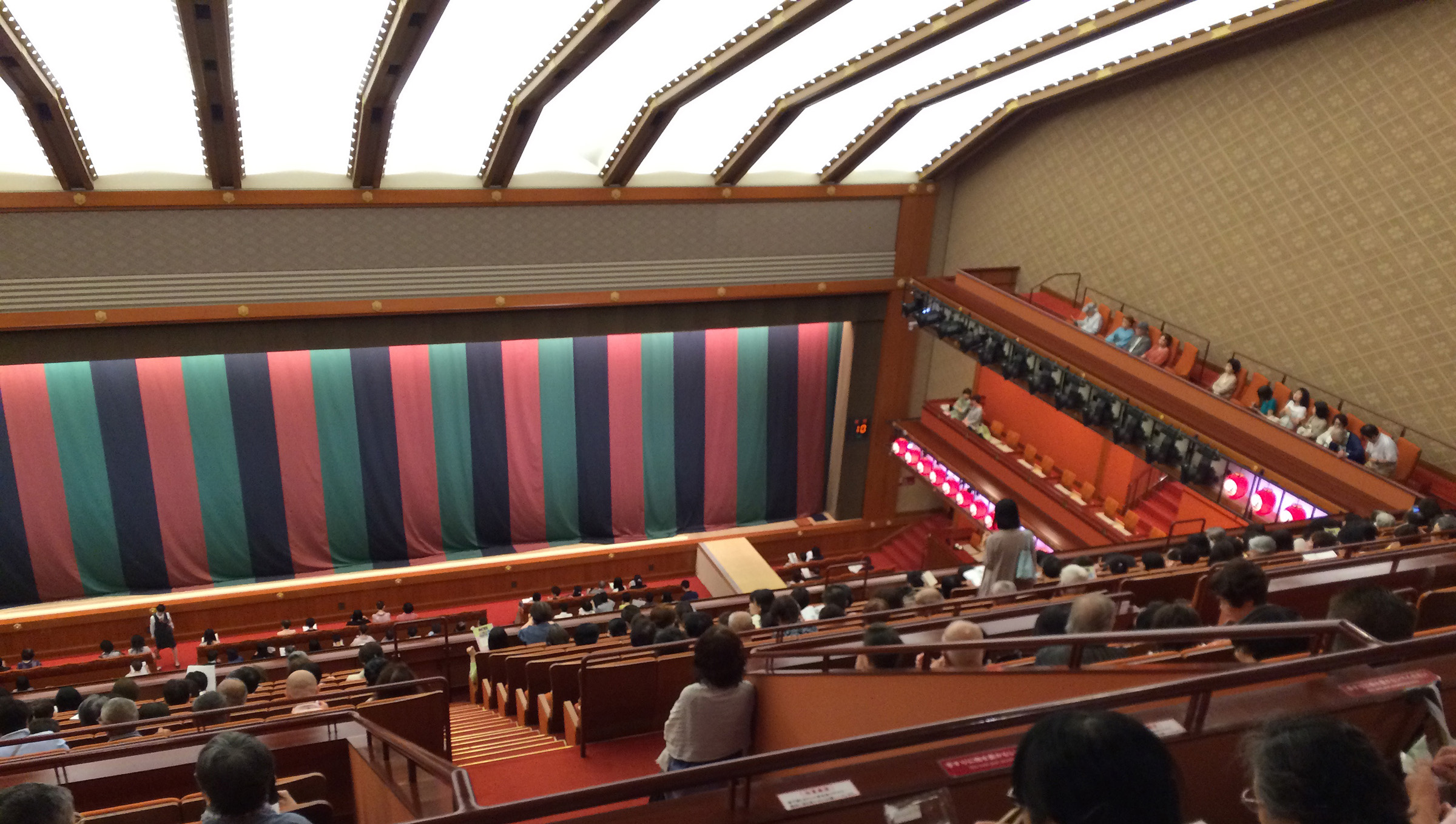
Theatre interior (2017)

The theatre on a sunny day (2025)
