= Ichimura-za =

Major kabuki theatre in Edo, Japan

- 市村座
- Murayama-za, Ichimura-Takenojō-za, Miyamoto-za, Satsuma-za
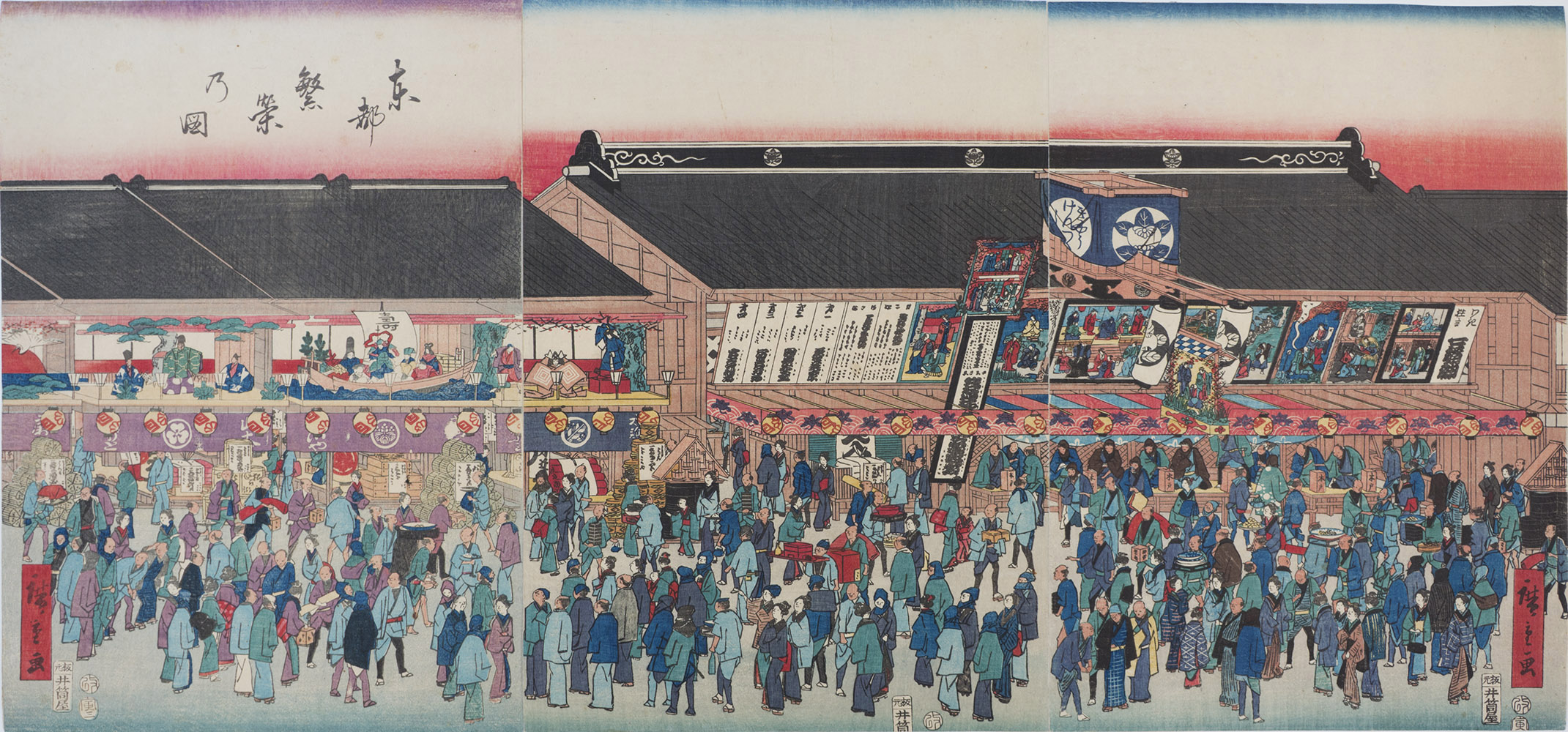
- Ichimura-za at Saruwaka-machi in Asakusa (1854)
- Location: Edo, Japan
- Owner: Ichimura family, others
- Type: Kabuki theatre

Construction
- Opened: March 1634
- Closed: 1932
- Rebuilt: 1657, 1703, 1855, numerous other times

The Ichimura-za (市村座) was a major kabuki theatre in the Japanese capital of Edo (later, Tokyo), for much of the Edo period, and into the 20th century. It was first opened in 1634 and was run by members of the Ichimura family for much of the following nearly three centuries before it was destroyed by fire in 1932. It has not been rebuilt.

== History ==
The theatre which would later be known as the Ichimura-za was founded as the Murayama-za, by Murayama Matasaburō I in March 1634. After it was destroyed by fire in 1641 and rebuilt, the theatre, now controlled by Murayama's son-in-law Murata Kuroemon, with the help of Ichimura Uzaemon III, was renamed the Ichimura-za in 1643. Uzaemon became the official manager of the theatre in 1652, upon Kuroemon's death.

The Ichimura-za was destroyed by fire and rebuilt numerous times over the years, including during the famous 1657 "Furisode Fire" or "Great Fire of Meireki". Ichimura Uzaemon III retired to become a priest in 1664, leaving ten-year-old Ichimura Takenojō I as his successor as zamoto (manager) of the theatre. It was then renamed the "Ichimura-Takenojō-za" for roughly a decade. In 1670, the shogunate officially restricted the licensed theatres in the city to four; the Ichimura-Takenojō-za received a license along with the Nakamura-za, Morita-za and Yamamura-za. The Ichimura-za would be host to numerous premieres and significant historical events for the kabuki genre. March 1680 saw the very first performance of a sayaate scene, or love rivals' competition; Chikamatsu Monzaemon's masterpiece The Battles of Coxinga, the first kabuki play derived from a bunraku (puppet) play to be performed in Edo, premiered simultaneously in 1717 at the Ichimura-za, and two other licensed theaters. Sugawara Denju Tenarai Kagami, which remains today among the three most famous and popular kabuki plays, debuted at the Ichimura-za in 1747.

From 1784 to 1788, and again from 1793 to 1798, the Ichimura-za was forced to close due to financial difficulties, and gave its license temporarily to the Kiri-za. This circumstance was relatively common in the kabuki world, and was experienced by all of the licensed theaters at least once; in some cases, repeatedly. The Ichimura-za would be forced to declare bankruptcy and close again from 1815–1821, during which time its license traded hands several times, as other theaters too went bankrupt. It eventually reopened, under the management of Ichimura Uzaemon XII.

After the theatre was destroyed once again by fire in 1841, and forbidden by the government to be rebuilt in its old location in the Sakai-chō neighborhood, the Ichimura-za was reconstructed and reopened in the Asakusa Saruwaka-chō area. In 1871, Ichimura Uzaemon XIV, struggling with the theater's debts, relinquished his position as zamoto, and gave control to Fukichi Mohei. Fukichi renamed the theater the Murayama-za once more, and named his 10-year-old son Murayama Matasaburō II as official zamoto. The theatre would change management, and names, two more times: to Miyamoto-za in 1874 and Satsuma-za in 1875, before it was destroyed by fire yet again, and reopened in 1878 as the Ichimura-za once more. The theater was no longer controlled by the Ichimura family however, and was then managed by Ichikawa Benzō and Nakamura Zenshirō. The theater was then acquired in 1908 by entrepreneur Tamura Nariyoshi, marking the beginning of a brief golden age for the theater. Onoe Kikugorō VI and Nakamura Kichiemon I, the stars of the Ichimura-za productions, were extremely popular, and for ten years brought great success to the Ichimura-za. A fire destroyed the theater for the last time, on May 21, 1932. It was not rebuilt.

== Zamoto ==
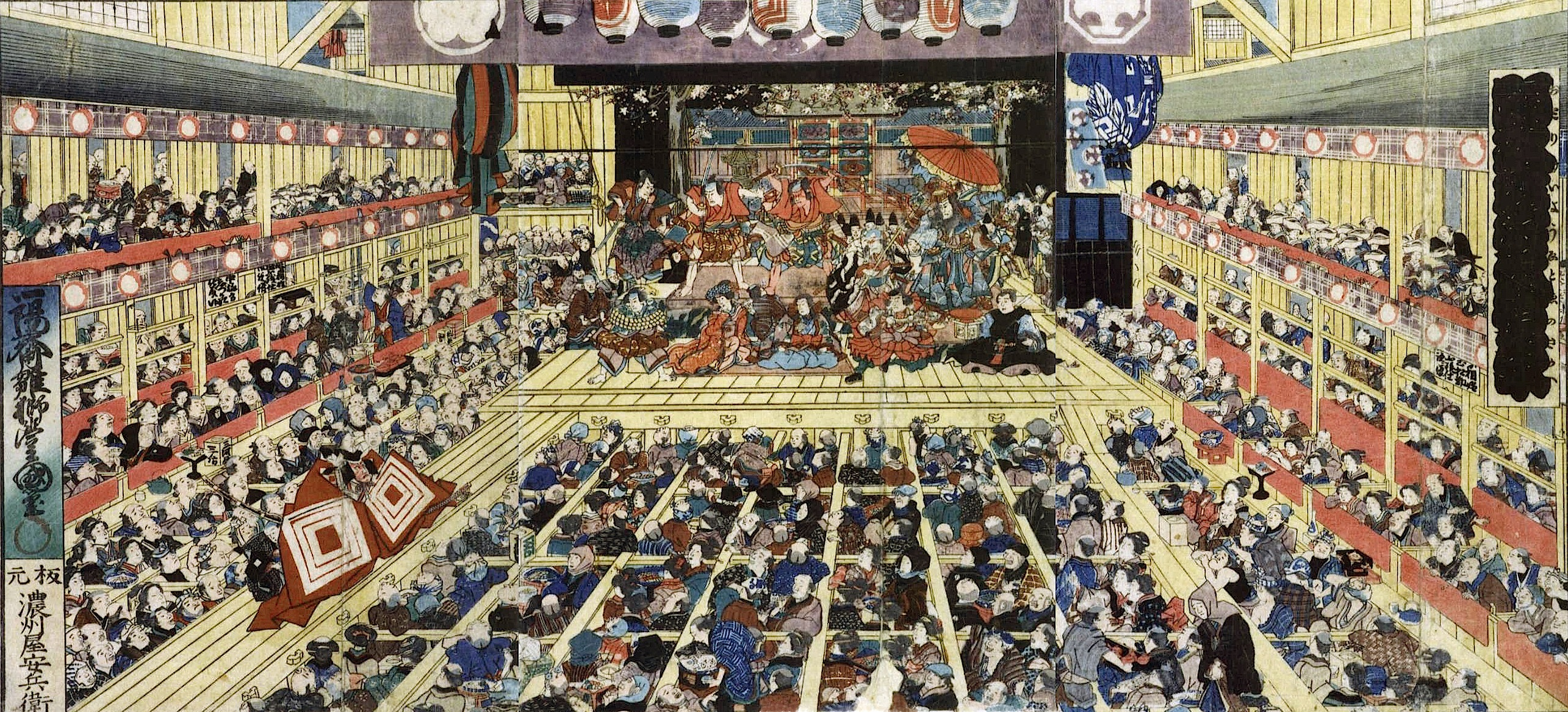
The July 1858 production of Shibaraku at the Ichimura-za theater in Edo. Triptych woodblock print by Utagawa Toyokuni III.

1. Murayama Matasaburō I (1634–1641)
2. Murata Kuroemon (1641–1652)
3. Ichimura Uzaemon III (1652–1664)
4. Ichimura Takenojō I (1664–1679)
5. Ichimura Uzaemon V (1679-?)
6. Ichimura Uzaemon IX (?-1785)
7. Ichimura Uzaemon X (1785–1799)
8. Ichimura Uzaemon XII (1821–1851)
9. Ichimura Uzaemon XIII (1851-1868?)
10. Ichimura Uzaemon XIV (1868–1871)
11. Murayama Matasaburō II (1871–1874)
12. Miyamoto Kisaburō (1874)
13. Satsuma Kichiemon (1875–1876)
14. Ichikawa Benzō & Nakamura Zenshirō (1878-1908?)
