= Nakamura (surname) =

- Pronunciation: Nakamura

Origin
- Origin: Japanese
- Meaning: Middle village
- Region of origin: Japanese

Nakamura (中村, Nakamura) is a Japanese family name.

== Sports ==
- Aiko Nakamura (中村 藍子; born 1983), Japanese tennis player
- Akihiko Nakamura (中村 明彦; born 1990), Japanese decathlete
- Ami Nakamura (中村 亜実; born 1987), Japanese ice hockey player
- Ayane Nakamura (中村 愛音; born 1993), Japanese figure skater
- Ayumi Nakamura (中村 亜友美; born 1990), Japanese volleyball player
- Chiharu Nakamura (中村 知春; born 1988), Japanese rugby sevens player
- Eiichi Nakamura (field hockey) (中村 英一; 1909–1945), Japanese field hockey player
- Hitoshi Nakamura (中村 等; born 1949), Japanese ice hockey player
- Katsumi Nakamura (中村 克; born 1994), Japanese swimmer
- Kazuhiro Nakamura (ski jumper) (born 1980), Japanese ski jumper
- Kazumi Nakamura (中村 和美; born 1971), Japanese volleyball player
- Kazuo Nakamura (basketball) (中村 和雄; born 1940), Japanese basketball coach
- Kenji Nakamura (sailor) (中村 健次; born 1964), Japanese sailor
- Kento Nakamura (中村 健人; born 1991), Japanese figure skater
- Kinjiro Nakamura (仲村 錦治郎; born 1975), Japanese table tennis player
- Kisato Nakamura (born 1993), Japanese cyclist
- Kiyoshi Nakamura (athlete) (中村 清; 1913–1985), Japanese middle-distance runner
- Kunihiko Nakamura (中村 邦彦; born 1939), Japanese basketball player
- Mai Nakamura (backstroke swimmer) (中村 真衣; born 1979), Japanese swimmer
- Mai Nakamura (synchronised swimmer) (中村 麻衣; born 1989), Japanese synchronized swimmer
- Naoto Nakamura (rugby union) (中村 直人; born 1969), Japanese rugby union player and coach
- Reikichi Nakamura (中村 礼吉; born 1916), Japanese speed skater
- Reiko Nakamura (中村 礼子; born 1982), Japanese swimmer
- Ryoto Nakamura (中村 亮土; born 1991), Japanese rugby union player
- Shota Nakamura (中村 奨太; born 1993), Japanese speed skater
- Shu Nakamura (中村 優; born 1996), Japanese figure skater
- Tadao Nakamura (born 1947), Japanese golfer
- Tadashi Nakamura (biathlete) (中村 忠; born 1956), Japanese biathlete
- Taniko Nakamura-Mitsukuri (中村-三栗 多仁子; born 1943), Japanese gymnast
- Teruo Nakamura (golfer) (born 1952), Japanese golfer
- Tomohiko Nakamura (born 1991), Japanese vert skater
- Torakichi Nakamura (中村 寅吉; 1915–2008), Japanese golfer
- Tōru Nakamura (golfer) (中村 通; born 1950), Japanese golfer
- Yasuo Nakamura (中村 康夫; born 1971), Japanese bobsledder
- Yuhei Nakamura (中村 悠平; born 1987), Japanese baseball player
- Yuji Nakamura (中村 祐二; born 1970), Japanese long-distance runner
- Yurika Nakamura (runner) (中村 友梨香; born 1986), Japanese long-distance runner
- Yūzo Nakamura (中村 祐造; 1942–2010), Japanese volleyball player

=== Martial arts and wrestling ===
- Daiki Nakamura (中村 大輝; born 1992), better known as Hokutofuji, Japanese sumo wrestler
- Daiki Nakamura (中村 泰輝; born 2000), better known as Onosato, Japanese sumo wrestler
- Daisuke Nakamura (fighter) (中村 大介; born 1980), Japanese mixed martial artist
- Hiroshi Nakamura (fighter) (中村 浩士; born 1981), Japanese mixed martial artist
- Kazuhiro Nakamura (中村 和裕; born 1979), Japanese mixed martial artist and judoka
- Keigo Nakamura (中村 圭吾; born 1999), Japanese professional wrestler
- Keita Nakamura (中村 K太郎; born 1984), Japanese mixed martial artist
- Kenzo Nakamura (中村 兼三; born 1973), Japanese judoka
- Misato Nakamura (中村 美里; born 1989), Japanese judoka
- Rie Nakamura (中村 理恵; born 1974), better known as Bad Nurse Nakamura, Japanese professional wrestler
- Seigi Nakamura (1924–1999), Okinawan karateka
- Shigeru Nakamura (karate instructor) (born 1894), Japanese karate instructor
- Shinsuke Nakamura (中邑 真輔; born 1980), Japanese professional wrestler and mixed martial artist
- Tempu Nakamura (中村 天風; 1876–1968), Japanese martial artist and founder of Japanese yoga
- Tetsuaki Nakamura (中村 哲明; born 1948), Japanese boxer
- Yoshio Nakamura (中村 佳央; born 1970), Japanese judoka
- Yukimasa Nakamura (中村 行成; born 1972), Japanese judoka

=== Baseball ===
- Akira Nakamura (baseball) (中村 晃; born 1989), Japanese baseball player
- Daishin Nakamura (中村 大伸; born 1966), Japanese baseball player
- Kyohei Nakamura (中村 恭平; born 1989), Japanese baseball player
- Masaru Nakamura (中村 勝; born 1991), Japanese baseball player
- Masato Nakamura (baseball) (中村 真人; born 1982), Japanese baseball player
- Micheal Nakamura (born 1976), Japanese-Australian baseball player
- Minoru Nakamura (中村 稔; born 1938), Japanese baseball player
- Norihiro Nakamura (中村 紀洋; born 1973), Japanese baseball player
- Shogo Nakamura (baseball) (中村 奨吾; born 1992), Japanese baseball player
- Takeya Nakamura (中村 剛也; born 1983), Japanese baseball player

=== Board games ===
- Nakamura Dōseki (中村 道碩; 1582–1630), Japanese Go player
- Hikaru Nakamura (born 1987), American chess player
- Momoko Nakamura (中村 桃子; born 1987), Japanese shogi player
- Osamu Nakamura (中村 修; born 1962), Japanese shogi player
- Shigeru Nakamura (renju player) (中村 茂; born 1959), Japanese Renju player
- Shinya Nakamura (仲邑 信也; born 1973), Japanese Go player
- Shuhei Nakamura (中村 修平; born 1981), Japanese Magic: The Gathering player
- Sumire Nakamura (仲邑 菫; born 2009), Japanese Go player
- Ryōsuke Nakamura (中村 亮介; born 1985), Japanese shogi player
- Taichi Nakamura (中村 太地; born 1988), Japanese shogi player

=== Football ===
- Akihiro Nakamura (中村 彰宏; born 1977), Japanese footballer
- Atsutaka Nakamura (中村 充孝; born 1990), Japanese footballer
- Haruki Nakamura (born 1986), American football player
- Hideyuki Nakamura (中村 英之; born 1984), Japanese footballer
- Hokuto Nakamura (中村 北斗; born 1985), Japanese footballer
- Kaede Nakamura (中村 楓; born 1991), Japanese women's footballer
- Kazuyoshi Nakamura (中村 一義; born 1955), Japanese footballer
- Keita Nakamura (footballer) (中村 慶太; born 1993), Japanese footballer
- Keito Nakamura (中村 敬斗; born 2000), Japanese footballer
- Kengo Nakamura (中村 憲剛; born 1980), Japanese footballer
- Kiyoshi Nakamura (footballer) (中村 聖; born 1971), Japanese footballer
- Kosei Nakamura (中村 幸聖; born 1981), Japanese footballer
- Kosuke Nakamura (中村 航輔; born 1995), Japanese footballer
- Kyoga Nakamura (仲村 京雅; born 1996), Japanese footballer
- Naoshi Nakamura (中村 直志; born 1979), Japanese footballer
- Ryota Nakamura (中村 亮太; born 1991), Japanese footballer
- Shigekazu Nakamura (中村 重和; born 1958), Japanese footballer and manager
- Shin Nakamura (中村 伸; born 1974), Japanese footballer
- Shun Nakamura (footballer) (中村 駿; born 1994), Japanese footballer
- Shunsuke Nakamura (中村 俊輔; born 1978), Japanese footballer
- Shunta Nakamura (中村 駿太; born 1999), Japanese footballer
- Tadashi Nakamura (footballer) (中村 忠; born 1971), Japanese footballer and manager
- Taisuke Nakamura (中村 太亮; born 1989), Japanese footballer
- Takumi Nakamura (中村 拓海; born 2001), Japanese footballer
- Toya Nakamura (中村 桐耶; born 2000), Japanese footballer
- Yoshiro Nakamura (中村 祥朗; born 1979), Japanese footballer
- Yuki Nakamura (中村 祐輝; born 1987), Japanese footballer
- Yusuke Nakamura (footballer) (中村 友亮; born 1986), Japanese footballer
- Yuto Nakamura (中村 祐人; born 1987), Japanese footballer
- Yuya Nakamura (footballer, born 1986) (中村 祐也), Japanese footballer

== Academia ==
- Akimasa Nakamura (中村 彰正; born 1961), Japanese astronomer
- Akira Nakamura (academic) (中村 粲; 1934–2010), Japanese academic
- Alice Nakamura, Canadian economist
- Eiichi Nakamura (chemist) (中村 栄一; born 1951), Japanese chemist
- Emi Nakamura, American economist
- Hajime Nakamura (中村 元; 1912–1999), Japanese academic
- Hiroshi Nakamura (biochemist) (中村 拓; 1890–1974), Japanese biochemist
- Karen Nakamura (born 1970), American academic and writer
- Kojiro Nakamura (中村 廣治郎), Japanese scholar of Islam
- Lisa Nakamura, American academic
- Satoshi Nakamura (中村 哲), Japanese scientist
- Shuji Nakamura (中村 修二; born 1954), Japanese-born American engineer, inventor of blue LEDs, academic and recipient of the Nobel Prize in Physics in 2014
- Takafusa Nakamura (中村 隆英; 1925–2013), Japanese economist
- Tetsu Nakamura (physician) (中村 哲; 1946–2019), Japanese physician
- Yasunobu Nakamura (中村 泰信; born 1968), Japanese quantum physicist
- Yusuke Nakamura (geneticist) (中村 祐輔; born 1952), Japanese geneticist and cancer researcher

== Arts ==
- Anne Nakamura (中村 アン; born 1987), Japanese model, television personality and actress
- Carol Nakamura (born 1983), Brazilian dancer, actress and television personality
- Chiyo Nakamura (中村 チヨ; 1906–1969), Japanese writer
- Fuminori Nakamura (中村 文則; born 1977), Japanese writer
- Makoto Nakamura (中村 誠; born 1970), Japanese anime screenwriter
- Mitsuo Nakamura (中村 光夫; 1911–1988), Japanese writer
- Risa Nakamura (中村 里砂; born 1989), Japanese model, actress, television personality, and businessperson
- Shin'ichirō Nakamura (中村 真一郎; 1918–1997), Japanese writer
- Tadashi Nakamura (filmmaker) (born c. 1980), Japanese-American filmmaker

=== Music ===
- Akiko Nakamura (中村晃子), Japanese singer and actress
- Ataru Nakamura (中村 中; born 1985), Japanese singer-songwriter and actress
- Aya Nakamura (born 1995), French singer (adopted as a stage name)
- Dan Nakamura, American music producer
- Goh Nakamura, American musician, film score composer and actor
- Hachidai Nakamura (中村 八大; 1931–1992), Japanese songwriter and jazz pianist
- Kaho Nakamura (中村 佳穂; born 1992), Japanese singer-songwriter and voice actress
- Kazuha Nakamura (中村 一葉; born 2003), Japanese singer, ballet dancer, rapper and member of K-pop girl group Le Sserafim
- Koji Nakamura (中村 弘二; born 1977), Japanese musician, and former guitarist and lead singer for the Japanese rock band Supercar
- Kôzô Nakamura (中村 康三), Japanese video game composer
- Maiko Nakamura (中村 舞子; born 1991), Japanese singer
- Masato Nakamura (中村 正人; born 1958), Japanese musician
- Naoto Nakamura (中村 直人; born 1979), Japanese singer-songwriter who performs under the name Naoto Inti Raymi
- Shigenobu Nakamura (中村 滋延; born 1950), Japanese composer and music teacher
- Tatsuya Nakamura (中村 達也; born 1965), Japanese musician
- Teruo Nakamura (musician) (中村 照夫; born 1942), Japanese jazz bassist
- Toshimaru Nakamura, Japanese musician
- Yu Nakamura (中村 優; born 1987), Japanese singer, model, television personality and gravure idol
- Yuriko Nakamura (中村 由利子), Japanese composer and pianist
- Hiroko Nakamura (中村 紘子; 1944–2016), Japanese classical pianist
- Takayuki Nakamura (中村 隆之; born 1967), Japanese video game composer

=== Acting ===
- Aoi Nakamura (中村 蒼; born 1991), Japanese actor
- Atsuo Nakamura (中村 敦夫; born 1940), Japanese actor and politician
- Ayano Nakamura (仲村 綾乃; born 1980), Japanese actress
- Chie Nakamura (中村 千絵), Japanese voice actress
- Chise Nakamura (中村 知世; born 1986), Japanese actress and gravure model
- Daiki Nakamura (中村 大樹; born 1962), Japanese voice actor
- Daisuke Nakamura (actor) (中村 太亮; born 1985), Japanese voice actor and actor
- Eriko Nakamura (中村 繪里子; born 1981), Japanese actress and voice actress
- Nakamura Ganjirō II (中村 鴈治郎; 1902–1983), Japanese actor
- Hidetoshi Nakamura (中村 秀利; 1954–2014), Japanese voice actor
- Kaito Nakamura (actor) (中村 嘉惟人; born 1998), Japanese actor and model
- Nakamura Kankurō VI (born 1981), Japanese kabuki actor
- Nakamura Kanzaburō, Kabuki stage name
- Nakamura Kanzaburō XVIII (1955–2012), Japanese kabuki actor
- Katsuo Nakamura (中村 嘉葎雄; born 1938), Japanese actor
- Mami Nakamura (中村 麻美; born 1979), Japanese actress
- Masatoshi Nakamura (中村 雅俊; born 1951), Japanese actor and singer
- Masaya Nakamura (actor) (中村 昌也; born 1986), Japanese actor
- Nobuo Nakamura (中村 伸郎; 1908–1991), Japanese actor
- Saemi Nakamura, American actress
- Nakamura Shichinosuke II (born 1983), Japanese kabuki actor
- Shizuka Nakamura (中村 静香; born 1988), Japanese gravure idol and actress
- Shugo Nakamura (仲村 宗悟; born 1988), Japanese voice actor and singer
- Shūsei Nakamura (仲村 秀生; 1935–2014), Japanese voice actor
- Suzy Nakamura, American actress
- Tadashi Nakamura (voice actor) (中村 正; 1929–2019), Japanese voice actor
- Tamao Nakamura (中村 玉緒; born 1939), Japanese actress
- Tetsu Nakamura (actor) (中村 哲; 1909–1992), Japanese actor and opera singer
- Tomoya Nakamura (中村 倫也; born 1986), Japanese actor
- Tōru Nakamura (actor) (仲村 トオル; born 1965), Japanese actor
- Nakamura Umemaru (初代 中村 梅丸; born 1996), Japanese kabuki actor
- Nakamura Utaemon I (1714–1791), Japanese actor
- Nakamura Utaemon II (1752–1798), Japanese actor
- Nakamura Utaemon III (1778–1838), Japanese actor
- Nakamura Utaemon IV (1798–1852), Japanese actor
- Nakamura Utaemon V (1865–1940), Japanese actor
- Nakamura Utaemon VI (1917–2001), Japanese actor
- Yuichi Nakamura (actor) (中村 優一; born 1987), Japanese actor and singer, member of Japanese talent group D-BOYS
- Yuichi Nakamura (voice actor) (中村 悠一; born 1980), Japanese voice actor
- Yūko Nakamura (中村 優子; born 1975), Japanese actress
- Yuri Nakamura (中村 友理; born 1982), Japanese actress and singer
- Yuri Nakamura (singer) (中村 由利), Japanese actress

=== Visual arts ===
- Asumiko Nakamura (中村 明日美子), Japanese manga artist
- Félix Nakamura (1940–2000), Peruvian animator
- Nakamura Fusetsu (中村 不折; 1866–1943), Japanese painter
- Gakuryō Nakamura (中村 岳陵; 1890–1969), Japanese painter
- Gorō Nakamura (中村 梧郎; born 1940), Japanese photographer
- Hikaru Nakamura (artist) (中村 光; born 1984), Japanese manga artist
- Hiroshi Nakamura (artist) (中村 宏; 1932–2026), Japanese artist
- Ikuo Nakamura (中村 征夫; born 1945), Japanese photographer
- Kazuo Nakamura (1926–2002), Japanese-Canadian painter and sculptor
- Kenji Nakamura (中村 健治; born 1970), Japanese anime director
- Masaya Nakamura (photographer) (中村 正也; 1926–2001), Japanese photographer
- Mitsuru Nakamura (中村 満), Japanese artist and poet
- Nakamura Daizaburō (中村 大三郎; 1898–1947), Japanese painter
- Naondo Nakamura (中村 直人; 1905–1981), Japanese painter and sculptor
- Noboru Nakamura (中村 登; 1913–1981), Japanese film director
- Rikkō Nakamura (中村 立行; 1912–1995), Japanese photographer
- Robert A. Nakamura (1936–2025), American documentary filmmaker
- Ryūtarō Nakamura (中村 隆太郎; 1955–2013), Japanese anime director
- Shungiku Nakamura (中村 春菊; born 1980), Japanese manga artist
- Takashi Nakamura (中村 たかし; born 1955), Japanese animator and anime director
- Nakamura Tsune (中村 彝; 1887–1924), Japanese yōga painter
- Yoshihiro Nakamura (中村 義洋; born 1970), Japanese film director and screenwriter
- Yoshiki Nakamura (仲村 佳樹; born 1969), Japanese manga artist
- Yutaka Nakamura (中村 豊; born 1967), Japanese animator

== Politics and military ==
- Aketo Nakamura (中村 明人; 1889–1966), Japanese general
- Hirohiko Nakamura (中村 博彦; 1943–2013), Japanese politician
- Hōdō Nakamura (中村 法道; born 1950), Japanese politician
- Itaru Nakamura (born 1963), Japanese police bureaucrat
- Nakamura Junkuro (中村 純九郎; 1853–1947), Japanese politician
- Kishirō Nakamura (中村 喜四郎; born 1949), Japanese politician
- Kōtarō Nakamura (中村 孝太郎; 1881–1947), Japanese general
- Kuniwo Nakamura (中村 國雄; 1943–2020), former President of Palau
- Nakamura Satoru (general) (中村 覚; 1854–1925), Imperial Japanese Army general
- Seiji Nakamura (仲村 正治; 1931–2018), Japanese politician
- Shozaburo Nakamura (中村 正三郎; 1934–2023), Japanese businessman and politician
- Tetsuji Nakamura (中村 哲治; born 1971), Japanese politician
- Tokihiro Nakamura (中村 時広; born 1960), Japanese politician
- Toshifumi Nakamura (中村 寿文; 1939–2024), Japanese politician
- Nakamura Yoshikoto (中村 是公; 1867–1927), Japanese bureaucrat, entrepreneur and politician
- Masao Nakamura (中村 正雄; 1892–1939), Japanese general

== Other ==
- Nakamura (bandit) or Nakamura Chōbei (中村 長兵衛), Japanese bandit and alleged slayer of Akechi Mitsuhide
- Craig H. Nakamura (born 1956), American jurist
- Eric Nakamura, American magazine publisher
- Hiroshi Nakamura (dissident) (中村 泰; 1930–2024), Japanese dissident and convicted murderer
- Nakamura Ichiroemon, 17th-century Japanese swordsman
- Ikumi Nakamura (中村 育美), Japanese video game artist
- Judith Nakamura (born 1960), American judge
- Kiharu Nakamura (中村 喜春; 1913–2004), Japanese geisha
- Koichi Nakamura (中村 光一; born 1964), Japanese video game designer
- Koumei Nakamura (中村 孝明; born 1947), Japanese celebrity chef
- Kunio Nakamura (中村 邦夫; 1939–2022), Japanese businessman
- Mamoru Nakamura (died 1992), first chief justice of the Supreme Court of Palau
- Nakamura Masanao (中村 正直; 1832–1891), Japanese samurai, philosopher and educator
- Masaya Nakamura (businessman) (中村 雅哉; 1925–2017), Japanese businessman
- Mitsuhiro Nakamura (中村 光宏; born 1984), Japanese announcer
- Satoru Nakamura (Scouting) (中村 知; 1893–1972), Japanese educator and Scouting leader
- Seisaku Nakamura (中村 誠策), Japanese serial killer
- Shiro Nakamura (中村 史郎; born 1950), Japanese car designer
- Teruo Nakamura (中村 輝夫; 1919−1979), Japanese soldier and World War II holdout
- William K. Nakamura (1922–1944), United States Army soldier and Medal of Honor recipient
- Yorinaga Nakamura (中村 頼永; born 1963), Japanese shoot wrestler
- Yugo Nakamura (中村 勇吾; born 1970), Japanese web designer

== Fictional characters ==
- Aika Nakamura, a character in the anime series Persona 4: The Animation
- Eri Nakamura (中村恵里, Nakamura Eri), a character in the Light Novel Series Arifureta
- Asako Nakamura, a character in the manga series Ushio and Tora
- Ethan Nakamura, a character in the novel series Percy Jackson and The Olympians
- Hajime Nakamura, a character in the tokusatsu series Kamen Rider Ryuki
- Hiro Nakamura, a character in the American television series Heroes
- Jay Nakamura, Superman (Jon Kent)'s boyfriend in DC Comics
- Kaito Nakamura, a character in the American television series Heroes
- Kimiko Nakamura, a character in the American television series Heroes
- Rio Nakamura (中村 莉桜), a character in the manga series Assassination Classroom
- Okuto Nakamura, a character in the manga series Go For It, Nakamura!
- Yuri Nakamura, a character in the anime series Angel Beats!
- Vice Admiral Nakamura, a character in the television series Star Trek: The Next Generation
- Nakamura, a character in the manga series Kodomo no Jikan
- Sawa Nakamura, a character in the manga "Aku no Hana"
- Suzy Nakamura, a character in the graphic novel American Born Chinese
- Shiori Nakamura, a character in the video game Yo-kai Watch
- Kana Nakamura, a character in the manga and anime series Nichijou

== See also ==
- Japanese name
- List of most popular Japanese family names
