= Nakamura Utaemon =

Nakamura Utaemon (中村歌右衛門) refers to one of six Japanese actors with family ties to classic kabuki theatre:

- Nakamura Utaemon I (1714–1791)
- Nakamura Utaemon II (1752-1798)
- Nakamura Utaemon III (1778-1838)
- Nakamura Utaemon IV (1798-1852)
- Nakamura Utaemon V (1865-1940)
- Nakamura Utaemon VI (1917-2001)
