= Hayata =

Hayata may refer to:

- Hayata, Afghanistan, a village in Balkh Province

Hayata (早田) is also a Japanese surname. It may refer to:

- Bunzō Hayata (1874–1934), a Japanese botanist
- Hina Hayata (早田 ひな, born 2000), Japanese table tennis player
- Takuji Hayata (born in 1940), a Japanese gymnast and Olympic champion
- Yūji Hayata (1916–1995), a renowned Japanese photographer

Fictional characters with the name Hayata (早田)

- Shin Hayata, the main character in the Japanese television series Ultraman.

Hayata (隼田) is also a Japanese surname. It may refer to:

- Yohei Hayata (born 1987), a Japanese professional wrestler

Orchids

- Hayata, a genus of orchids

Hayata (隼太) is also a Japanese first name. It may refer to:

- Hayata Ito (1989), a Japanese baseball player
- Hayata Komatsu (1997), Japanese football player
