= Tomohiko =

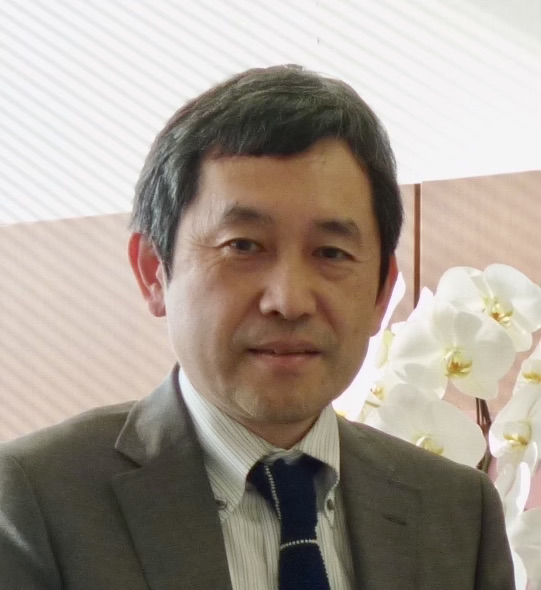
- Tomohiko Takasaki, Japanese physician and virologist
- Pronunciation: tomoçiko (IPA)
- Gender: Male

Origin
- Origin: Japanese
- Meaning: Different meanings depending on the kanji used

Tomohiko is a masculine Japanese given name.

== Written forms ==
Tomohiko can be written using different combinations of kanji characters. Some examples:

- 友彦, "friend, elegant boy"
- 友比古, "friend, young man (archaic)"
- 知彦, "know, elegant boy"
- 知比古, "know, young man (archaic)"
- 智彦, "intellect, elegant boy"
- 智比古, "intellect, young man (archaic)"
- 共彦, "together, elegant boy"
- 共比古, "together, young man (archaic)"
- 朋彦, "companion, elegant boy"
- 朋比古, "companion, young man (archaic)"
- 朝彦, "morning/dynasty, elegant boy"
- 朝比古, "morning/dynasty, young man (archaic)"

The name can also be written in hiragana ともひこ or katakana トモヒコ.

== Notable people with the name ==
- Tomohiko Hoshina (保科 智彦; born 1987), Filipino-Japanese judoka
- Tomohiko Ikeuchi (池内 友彦; born 1977), Japanese footballer
- Tomohiko Ikoma (生駒 友彦; 1932–2009), Japanese footballer
- Tomohiko Itō (director) (伊藤 智彦; born 1978), Japanese anime director
- Tomohiko Ito (footballer) (伊藤 友彦; born 1978), Japanese footballer
- Tomohiko Kira (吉良 知彦; 1959–2016), Japanese guitarist
- Tomohiko Miyazaki (宮崎 智彦; born 1986), Japanese footballer
- Tomohiko Murayama (村山 智彦; born 1987), Japanese footballer
- Tomohiko Nakamura (中村 友彦; born 1991), Japanese vert skater
- Tomohiko Takasaki (高崎 智彦; born 1957), Japanese physician and virologist
- Tomohiko Tomita (富田 朝彦; 1920–2003), Grand Steward of the Imperial Household Agency
