= Nakamura =

Nakamura (中村, Nakamura) may refer to:

- Nakamura (surname), a list of people with the surname
- Nakamura, Kōchi, a former city in Kōchi Prefecture, Japan
- Nakamura-ku, Nagoya, a ward in Nagoya city in Aichi Prefecture, Japan
- Nakamura stable, a stable of sumo wrestlers
- Nakamura Station, a railway station in Shimanto, Kōchi Prefecture, Japan
- Nakamura (album), a 2018 album by Aya Nakamura

== See also ==
- Zhongcun, the Mandarin Chinese reading of the characters 中村
- Namakura language, an Oceanic language of Vanuatu
