= Zen (2009 film) =

Zen 禅
- Theatrical release poster
- Directed by: Banmei Takahashi
- Screenplay by: Banmei Takahashi
- Based on: Eihei no kaze: Dōgen no shōgai by Tetsuo Ōtani
- Starring: Nakamura Kantarō II; Yuki Uchida
- Cinematography: Noriyuki Mizuguchi
- Edited by: Junichi Kikuchi
- Music by: Ryudo Uzaki
- Production companies: Kadokawa Pictures; Twins Japan
- Distributed by: Kadokawa Pictures
- Release date: 10 January 2009 (Japan)
- Running time: 127 minutes
- Country: Japan
- Languages: Japanese; Mandarin

Zen (Japanese: 禅) is a 2009 film directed by Banmei Takahashi and starring Nakamura Kantarō II as Dogen, and Yuki Uchida as Orin. The story is based on the novel Eihei no kaze: Dōgen no shōgai written by Tetsuo Ōtani in 2001.

The film is a biography of Dōgen Zenji, a Japanese Zen Buddhist teacher. After travelling to China to study, Dogen founded the Sōtō school of Zen in Japan. The Buddhist Film Foundation described it as "a poignant, in-depth, reverent and surprisingly moving portrait of Eihei Dogen."

== Reception ==
Russell Edwards of Variety described it as "The origins of a spiritual tradition are depicted with prerequisite solemnity and a pleasing veneer of arthouse showmanship." Mark Schilling, writing for The Japan Times, gave the film three and a half stars and described it as a "rare serious film about this form of Buddhism, which has had a huge cultural influence but is little understood — let alone practiced — by ordinary Japanese."

== Release ==
The film premiered in Japan in 2009. The following year, it had its US debut at the International Buddhist Film Festival. The film was released on DVD and includes a short documentary entitled The Zen of Dogen with Kazuaki Tanahashi.
