= Zhongcun =

Zhongcun may refer to:

== Populated places ==
- Zhongcun, Yanling (中村乡), a township in Yanling County, Zhuzhou, Hunan, China
- Zhongcun Township, Fujian (中村乡), a township in Sanyun District, Sanming, Fujian, China
- Zhongcun Township, Huichang County (中村乡), a township in Huichang County, Ganzhou, Jiangxi, China
- Zhongcun Township, Zhejiang (中村乡), a township in Kaihua County, Quzhou, Zhejiang, China
- Zhongcun, Pingyi County (仲村镇) a town in Pingyi County, Linyi, Shandong, China
- Zhongcun, Qinshui (中村镇), a town in Qingshui County, Jincheng, Shanxi, China
- Zhongcun Subdistrict (钟村街道), a subdistrict of Panyu District, Guangzhou, Guangdong, China

== Metro stations ==
- Zhongcun station (disambiguation)

== See also ==
- Nakamura (disambiguation), the Japanese-language reading of the characters 中村
