= Nakamura Shikan VII =

Nakamura Shikan VII 七代目中村芝翫
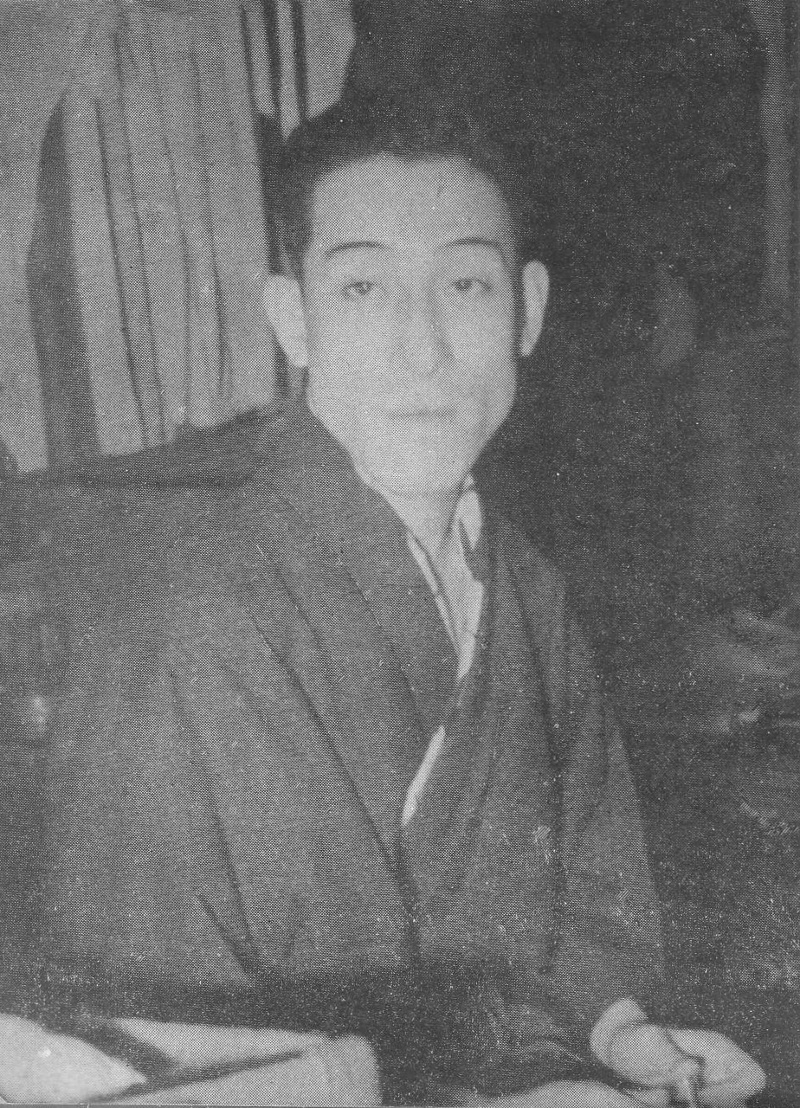
- Born: Makio Nakamura; 11 March 1928; Tokyo, Japan
- Died: 10 October 2011 (aged 83); Tokyo, Japan
- Other names: Eijirô Nakamura, Nakamura Kotarō IV, Nakamura Fukusuke IX, Narikomaya
- Children: Nakamura Fukusuke IX (eldest son); Nakamura Shikan VIII (youngest son)
- Father: Nakamura Fukusuke V
- Relatives: Nakamura Utaemon V (grandfather); Nakamura Utaemon VI (uncle); Nakamura Kanzaburō XVIII (son-in-law); Nakamura Kankurō VI (grandson); Nakamura Shichinosuke II (grandson); Nakamura Kotarō VI (grandson); Nakamura Hashinosuke IV(grandson); Nakamura Fukunosuke III(grandson); Nakamura Utanosuke IV (grandson); Nakamura Kantarō III (great-grandson); Nakamura Chōzaburō II (grandson)

Nakamura Shikan VII (七代目 中村 芝翫, Shichidaime Nakamura Shikan) (March 11, 1928 – October 10, 2011) was a Japanese kabuki performer noted for his onnagata roles.

== Biography ==
His real name Nakamura Eijirô, in 1967 Nakamura became the seventh person to adopt the Nakamura Shikan name. In 1996 he became recognized as a Living National Treasures of Japan, and in 2006 he became a Person of Cultural Merit. Nakamura is a grandson of Nakamura Utaemon V.

== See also ==
- Living National Treasures of Japan
