= Masaya Nakamura (photographer) =

Japanese photographer

Masaya Nakamura (中村 正也, Nakamura Masaya; 1926–2001) was a Japanese photographer particularly known for nude photography.

Nakamura was born in Yokohama on 29 March 1926. After graduating in 1948 from the precursor of Chiba University, he moved through a series of employers photographing actors and doing still photography for films. He went freelance in 1951 and in 1954 joined with Yūji Hayata in setting up Hayata's studio. He was also doing work for the magazine Chūō Kōron.

From the mid-1950s Nakamura increasingly concentrated on nudes. (One appeared in the 30th anniversary issue of Life in 1966.) In 1958 he set up his own company, Masaya Studio (マサヤスタジオ, Masaya sutajio).

He married, then divorced Kiharu Nakamura before she moved to New York City.

== Books showing Nakamura's works ==
- Guramaa foto no utsushikata (グラマア・フォトの写し方). Jitsuyō Hyakka Sensho. Tokyo: Kin'ensha, 1957.
- (in French) Nus japonais. Paris: Editions Prisma, 1959.
- Young Nude. Camera-Art-sha, 1961.
- Nude nishi to higashi (Nude西と東). Tokyo: Mainichi Shinbunsha, 1969.
- Ema nūdo in Afurika: Kami kara nusunda atsui hadaka (エマ・ヌード・イン・アフリカ：神から盗んだ熱い裸) / Ema Nude in Africa. Tokyo: Heibonsha, 1971. Revised. Sonorama Shashin Sensho 13. Tokyo: Asahi Sonorama, 1978.
- Onna no anguru (女のアングル). Gendai Kamera Shinsho. Tokyo: Asahi Sonorama, 1976.
- Boku no shigoto: Nakamura Masaya (僕の仕事・中村正也). Special issue (bessatsu) of Photo Contest. Tokyo, 1976.
- Utsusareta onna (写された女) / Woman's Sphere. Tokyo: Azuma Shuppan, 1978.
- Iki (粋). Nihon no Kokoro 6. Tokyo: Shūeisha, 1981.
- (in Japanese) Nakamura Masaya (中村正也). Shōwa Shashin Zenshigoto 8. Tokyo: Asahi Shinbunsha, 1983.
- Denshin otama: Kaika sōshi (電信お玉 開化草紙). Tokyo: Canon Club, 1984.
- Kyō no shiki (京の私季). Tokyo: Kumon, 1985. With haiku by Ushio Tsunemoto (津根元潮, Tsunemoto Ushio).
- Ao kimono tachi (青きものたち). BeeBooks. Tokyo: Okamura, 1990.
- Hiru-sagari no shisen (昼下がりの視線) / A Midday Stroll. Genkōsha Mook 30 Photo Salon. Genkōsha, 1990. ISBN 4-7683-0013-8.
- Supein (スペイン<炎の喝采>). Tokyo: Nippon Camera, 1991.
- Yume machigusa (夢まちぐさ). Nihon Manpower, 1992. ISBN 4-8220-0038-9.
- Kyō ochikochi: Miyakobito to sennen no kokoro to shiki no en (京・をちこち：都びと千年の心と四季の艶). BeeBooks. Tokyo: Okamura, 1993. ISBN 4-89615-160-7.
- Nyūjīrando kikō (ニュージーランド紀行) / New Zealand. Tokyo: Nippon Camera, 1995. ISBN 4-8179-2032-7.
- Yūshun, sarabureddo (優駿・サラブレッド). Kukizaki-machi, Ibaraki: Keiba Techō Sha, 1996. ISBN 4-924426-50-4.
- 中村正也作品展：戦後の座標. JICC Photo Salon Library 78. Tokyo: JICC Photo Salon, 1998.
- 中村正也作品展：「野分け」と正也の世界. JCII photo salon library 131. Tokyo: JICC Photo Salon, 2002.
