= Turn (film) =

2001 film by Hideyuki Hirayama

- DVD cover
- Directed by: Hideyuki Hirayama
- Screenplay by: Osamu Murakami
- Based on: Tān by Kaoru Kitamura
- Produced by: Machiko Makiyama; Isao Yoshiwara
- Starring: Riho Makise; Nakamura Kantarō II; Mitsuko Baisho
- Cinematography: Junichi Fujisawa
- Edited by: Shigeru Okuhara
- Music by: Mickie Yoshino
- Production companies: Bamboo Pictures; Eisei Gekijo; TV Tokyo; Asmik Ace Entertainment
- Distributed by: Asmik Ace Entertainment
- Release date: October 13, 2001 (Japan)
- Running time: 111 minutes
- Country: Japan
- Language: Japanese

Turn (Japanese: ターン, Hepburn: Tān) is a 2001 Japanese time loop film directed by Hideyuki Hirayama. It is based on the novel of the same name by Kaoru Kitamura.

== Cast ==
- Riho Makise as Maki Mori
- Nakamura Kantarō II as Yohei Izumi
- Mitsuko Baisho as Satoko Mori
- Kazuki Kitamura as Kiyotaka Kakizaki

== Reception ==
A review for The Stop Button said, "Turn manages to suffer most of the downsides of the twist ending."
