= Sanada 10 Braves =

- Poster
- Japanese: 真田十勇士
- Directed by: Yukihiko Tsutsumi
- Written by: Nozomi Makino; Tetsuya Suzuki
- Produced by: Satoshi Fukushima; Takuya Ito; Nobuyuki Iinuma
- Starring: Nakamura Kankurō VI; Tori Matsuzaka; Yuko Oshima; Kento Nagayama; Ken Matsudaira; Masaya Kato; Shinobu Otake
- Cinematography: Satoru Karasawa
- Edited by: Nobuyuki Ito
- Music by: Gabriele Roberto
- Production companies: Sanada Ten Braves Film Partners (Nippon TV, Shochiku, Nikkatsu, D.N. Dream Partners, Yomiuri Telecasting Corporation, Dentsu, Pony Canyon, Yomiuri Shimbun, East Japan Marketing & Communications, Office Crescendo, Sapporo Television Broadcasting, Miyagi Television Broadcasting, Shizuoka Daiichi Television, Chūkyō Television Broadcasting, Hiroshima Telecasting, Fukuoka Broadcasting System)
- Distributed by: Shochiku; Nikkatsu
- Release date: September 22, 2016 (Japan)
- Running time: 135 minutes
- Country: Japan
- Language: Japanese
- Box office: US$2.2 million

Sanada 10 Braves (Japanese: 真田十勇士, Hepburn: Jūyūshi) is a 2016 Japanese jidaigeki action film directed by Yukihiko Tsutsumi. It was released in Japan by Shochiku and Nikkatsu on September 22, 2016.

== Cast ==
- Nakamura Kankurō VI as Sarutobi Sasuke
- Tori Matsuzaka as Kirigakure Saizō
- Yuko Oshima as Hotaru
- Kento Nagayama as Nezu Jinpachi
- Mitsuomi Takahashi as Kakei Jūzō
- Tarō Suruga
- Ryouta Murai
- Atsushi Arai
- Ayumu Mochizuki
- Ken Aoki
- Yuma Ishigaki
- Kazuki Kato
- Ken Matsudaira (special appearance) as Tokugawa Ieyasu
- Masaya Kato as Sanada Yukimura
- Shinobu Otake as Yodo-dono

== Reception ==
On its opening weekend in Japan the film was seventh placed, with US$1 million.
