= Unbound (TV series) =

2025 Japanese TV series

- Written by: Yoshiko Morishita
- Directed by: Taku Ōhara and others
- Starring: Ryusei Yokohama; Shota Sometani; Ken Yasuda; Ai Hashimoto; Fuka Koshiba; Haruka Fukuhara; Kenta Kiritani; Hio Miyazawa; Nakamura Hayato; Aoi Nakamura; Atsushi Itō; Hideomi Shima; Yasukaze Motomiya; Bokuzō Masana; Yumi Adachi; Kazuhiro Yamaji; Yūta Furukawa; Shunsuke Kazama; Yuki Inoue; Toma Ikuta; Kataoka Ainosuke VI; Katsumi Takahashi; Kōji Ishizaka; Kōtarō Satomi; Ken Watanabe
- Narrated by: Haruka Ayase
- Composer: John R. Graham
- Country of origin: Japan
- Original language: Japanese
- No. of episodes: 48

Production
- Running time: 45 minutes
- Production company: NHK

Original release
- Network: NHK General TV
- Release: January 5 – December 14, 2025

Unbound (べらぼう〜蔦重栄華乃夢噺〜, Berabou Tsutajū Eiga no Yume-banashi) is a Japanese historical drama television series starring Ryusei Yokohama as Tsutaya Jūzaburō. The series is the 64th NHK taiga drama.

== Plot ==
In the mid-18th century Japan, the Rōjū Tanuma Okitsugu prioritized commerce over agriculture to rebuild the nation's finances. As the economy improved, a relatively liberal atmosphere emerged among the common people, fostering cultural development. One of the central figures in this cultural movement was Tsutaya Jūzaburō, a publisher. However, when the era transitioned to Matsudaira Sadanobu's governance from Tanuma's, stricter controls on entertainment were imposed, causing hardship for Jūzaburō. Even so, he remained undeterred, discovering and making talents such as Utamaro, Hokusai and Sharaku (Note: While the theory that Sharaku's true identity was Saito Jurobei is considered the most promising, there is also a theory that he was the result of a collaboration between multiple artists, and this drama adopts the latter.) famous.

== Cast ==
=== Starring role ===
- Ryusei Yokohama as Tsutaya "Tsutajū" Jūzaburō
  - Haru Takagi as young Tsutajū

=== His family ===
- Ai Hashimoto as Tei, Jūzaburō's wife
- Katsumi Takahashi as Surugaya, Jūzaburō's foster father
- Naoko Iijima as Fuji, Jūzaburō's foster mother
- Aoi Nakamura as Jirobei, Surugaya's son
- Rei Maruyama as Toku, Jirobei's wife
- Saki Takaoka as Tsuyo, Jūzaburō's mother
- Sumi Shimamoto as Taka
- Tsubasa Nakagawa as Minokichi

=== Publishing industry ===
- Kōtarō Satomi as Suwaraya Ichibei
- Shunsuke Kazama as Tsuruya Kiemon
- Masahiko Nishimura as Nishimura Yohachi, Jūzaburō's rival
- Kataoka Ainosuke VI as Urokogataya Magobei
- Mami Hachiya as Rin, Magobei's wife
- Ryota Miura as Urokogataya Chōbei, Magobei's son
- Tateto Serizawa as Koizumi Chūgorō
- Rintaro Mizusawa as Tomeshirō
- Yu Tokui as Tōhachi
- Yasushi Kawabata as Kashiwaraya
- Yōji Matsuda as Murataya Jirobei
- Kazuya Nakai as Iwatoya Genpachi
- Tomokazu Seki as Okumuraya Genroku
- Wataru Takagi as Matsumuraya Yahei
- Ryuta Mine as Kumanoya
- Taka Takao as Maruya Kohei
- Ōtani Hiromatsu II as Owariya Hikojiro
- Kenshiro Kawanishi as Owada Yasubei
- Nakamura Kangyoku as Manjiro

=== Artists ===
- Ken Yasuda as Hiraga Gennai
- Shota Sometani as Kitagawa Utamaro
  - Towa Watanabe as Karamaru (young Utamaro)
- Sawako Fujima as Kiyo, Uatamaro's wife
- Tekken as Isoda Koryūsai
- Atsushi Hashimoto as Kitao Shigemasa
- Tomoya Maeno as Katsukawa Shunshō
- Ryo Kimura as Hezutsu Tōsaku
- Yūta Furukawa as Santō Kyōden, a.k.a. Kitao Masanobu
- Amane Okayama as Koikawa Harumachi, a.k.a. Kurahashi Itaru
- Mitsuki Tanimura as Shizu, Harumachi's wife
- Kanichiro as Tomimoto Umanosuke II
- Shigehiro Yamaguchi as Tōrai Sanna
- Bun'ichi Hamanaka as Akera Kankō
- Tsurutaro Kataoka as Toriyama Sekien
- Ryutei Saryu VI as Utei Enba
- Toranosuke Kato as Kitagawa Toyoaki
- Toshinori Omi as Hōseidō Kisanji, a.k.a. Hirasawa Tsunemasa
- Tsuyoshi Takashima as Kitao Masayoshi
- Naoki Matayoshi as Yadoya no Meshimori, a.k.a. Ishikawa Masamochi
- Leon Niihama as Tomimoto Itsukidayu
- Yoshiaki Kameda as Shiba Zenkō
- Cookie! as Hokusai, a.k.a. Katsukawa Shunro
- Yoshio Inoue as Jippensha Ikku, a.k.a. Shigeta Sadakazu
- Kenjiro Tsuda as Kyokutei Bakin, a.k.a. Takizawa Sakichi

=== Tokugawa shogunate ===
- Ken Watanabe as Tanuma Okitsugu
- Hio Miyazawa as Tanuma Okitomo, Okitsugu's son
- Shuntaro Miyao as Tanuma Okimune, Okitsugu's nephew
- Hidekazu Mashima as Tokugawa Ieharu, the 10th shōgun
- Rin Takanashi as Lady Chiho (Renkō-in), Iemoto's mother
- Tomoya Oku as Tokugawa Iemoto, Ieharu and Chiho's son
- Kōji Ishizaka as Matsudaira Takechika
- Toma Ikuta as Hitotsubashi Harusada, Ienari's father
- Kairi Jo as Tokugawa Ienari, the 11th shōgun
  - Tsubasa Nagao as Hitotsubashi Toyochiyo (young Ienari)
- Motoki Ochiai as Shimizu Shigeyoshi
- Yuki Inoue as Matsudaira Sadanobu
  - Kokoro Terada as Tayasu Masamaru (young Sadanobu)
- Mari Hanafusa as Hōren-in
- Yūma Yamoto as Sano Masakoto
- Kazutoyo Yoshimi as Sano Masatoyo, Masakoto's father
- Hisashi Yoshizawa as Matsumoto Hidemochi
- Nakamura Hayato as Hasegawa Heizo
- Taizo Harada as Miura Shōji
- Kazuyuki Aijima as Matsudaira Yasuyoshi
- Kenta Kiritani as Ōta Nanpo, a.k.a. Yomo no Akara
- Shuntaro Yanagi as Tsuchiyama Sōjirō
- Jingi Irie as Tayasu Haruaki
- Ayu Oda as Tanehime
- Kazuhiko Inoue as a Bugyō
- Hideki Takahashi as Tokugawa Harusada
- Hiroaki Hirata as Magaribuchi Kagetsugu
- Eita Okuno as Tokugawa Harumori
- Takaaki Enoki as Tokugawa Munechika
- Kazushige Komatsu as Mizuno Tadatomo
- Nadal as an Omote Bouzu
- Shodai Fukuyama as Matsudaira Nobuakira
- Kunihiro Suda as Abe Masatomo
- Akira Otaka as Makino Sadanaga
- Kenichi Yajima as Honda Tadakazu
- Miou Tanaka as Hajikano Nobuaki

Ōoku

- Ai Tominaga as Takaoka
- Kurara Emi as Ōsaki
- Noa Kawazoe as Tsuruko

=== Yoshiwara pleasure quarters ===
- Fuka Koshiba as Hananoi (Segawa V)
  - Hana Maeda as Azami (young Hananoi)
- Haruka Fukuhara as Tagasode
  - Kurumi Inagaki as Kaori (young Tagasode)
- Miki Mizuno as Ine
- Ryo Tamaki as Toyoshima
- Sayu Kubota as Matsunoi
- Karin Ono as Utsusemi
- Ayaka Higashino as Shizuyama
- Runa Nakashima as Chidori
- Rino Katase as Kiku
- Yumi Adachi as Ritsu
- Reika Manaki as Asagao
- Momiji Yamamura as Shige
- Bokuzō Masana as Matsubaya
- Kazuhiro Yamaji as Ōgiya
- Atsushi Itō as Daimonjiya and Daimonjiya II
- Hideomi Shima as Chōjiya
- Moka Otsuka as Kamegiku
- Masaki Hiradate as Katsuyama
- Hikari Kabashima as Tokiwagi
- Haruka Kinoshita as Tamakawa
- Yorie Yamashita as Masa
- Chisato Someya as Ureshino
- Umi Shinonome as Hisa
- Yasukaze Motomiya as Wakagiya Yohachi
- Miu Arai as Sae
- Satomi Nagano as Hatsu
- Shiori Tamada as Wakanami
- Futo Nozomi as Kikuzono

=== Others ===
- Haruka Ayase as Kurosuke Inari / narrator
- Hayato Ichihara as Toriyama Kengyō
- Kai Inowaki as Oda Shinnosuke
- Naomasa Musaka as Hanjirō
- Nene Yoshitaka as a corpse
- Kanna Fuji as a corpse
- Rin Yoda as a corpse
- So Yamanaka as Sugita Genpaku
- James Onoda as Moto no Mokuami
- Nana Mizuki as Cie no Naishi
- Kensuke Sasaki as a boatman
- Toshiki Ayata as the owner of a charcoal shop
- Katsuya Takagi as the man with a scar on his face
- Katsuhiro Higo as Shigoroku
- Hayashiya Sanpei II as a wealthy merchant
- Jin Katagiri as Yashichi
- Yōjin Hino as Mori Chūemon
- Donpei as a Zatō
- Imoaraizaka Kakaricho as Gosaku
- Kazuki Enari as Matsumae Michihiro
- Hyouroku as Matsumae Hirotoshi
- Kentaro Motomura as a theater proprietor
- Masato Yano as Jōemon
- Tomoaki Saito as Kyūgorō
- Hiroshi Kobayashi as Inoue Iori
- Yuka Kouri as Karamaru's mother
- Shima Iwai as Jakuren
- Jyubun Fukuzawa as a doctor
- Koutaro Tanaka as Shimazu Shigehide
- Hajime Okayama as Kudo Heisuke
- Majime Ono as a Mochi pounder
- Sen-chan as a Mochi kneader
- Endō Shōta as a Sumo wrestler
- Wakamotoharu Minato as a Sumo wrestler
- Nishikigi Tetsuya as a Sumo wrestler
- Takahiro Kimata as Inaba Masaaki
- Masami Horiuchi as Shirokiya Hikotaro
- Kazue Itō as Matsu
- Becky as Take
- Maki Fukuda as Ume
- Makita Sports as Kakuen
- Shouma Kai as Choshichi
- Kyusaku Shimada as Shibano Ritsuzan
- Hayashiya Taihei as Obiki Akazo
- Garibens Yano as Zenkichi
- Eriko Nakamura as Nabe
- Sachiko Kokubu as Tsuya
- Keisuke Oda as Yoneji
- Hiroiki Ariyoshi as Hattori Hanzō
- Takuro Mashiko as Kamaya Ihei
- Kaoru Fukuda as Kihei
- Hayashiya Shōzō IX as Matsudaira Nobuyoshi
- Manabu Takeuchi as a poor samurai
- Hikari Ōta as Kaiun
- Yuji Tanaka as a Kanso-ka
- Hideyuki Nakayama as Katō Chikage
- Dayu Koume as Naniwaya
- Naoto Eguchi as a degenerate monk
- Ikue Sakakibara as a midwife
- Ryotaro Sakaguchi as Nakayama Tomisaburo
- Mansaku Fuwa as Miyako-za proprietor
- Moro Morooka as Kawarasaki-za proprietor
- Takeshi Kongochi as Kiri-za proprietor
- Toma Ikuta (Note: dual role) as Saito Jurobei
- Kazuki Kitamura as Motoori Norinaga
- Taiiku Okazaki as Eishōsai Chōki

== TV schedule ==
Episode	Title	Directed by	Original airdate	Rating
1	"Arigata-yama no Kangarasu" (ありがた山の寒がらす)	Taku Ōhara	January 5, 2025	12.6%
2	"Yoshiwara Saiken <Aa, Oedo>" (吉原細見 『嗚呼御江戸』)	Taku Ōhara	January 12, 2025	12.0%
3	"Senkyaku Banrai <Hitome Senbon>" (千客万来 『一目千本』)	Taku Ōhara	January 19, 2025	11.7%
4	"<Hinagata Wakana> no Amai Wana" (『雛形若菜』の甘い罠)	Takashi Fukagawa	January 26, 2025	10.5%
5	"Tsuta ni Karamaru Inga no Tsuru" (蔦に唐丸因果の蔓)	Taku Ōhara	February 2, 2025	10.6%
6	"Uroko Hagareta <Setsuyō-shū>" (鱗剥がれた『節用集』)	Takashi Fukagawa	February 9, 2025	10.2%
7	"Kōki Tōrai <Magaki no Hana>" (好機到来『籬の花』)	Takashi Fukagawa	February 16, 2025	10.0%
8	"Gyakushū no <Kinkin Sensei>" (逆襲の『金々先生』)	Shinzo Nitta	February 23, 2025	9.8%
9	"Tamagiku-dōrō Koi no Jigoku" (玉菊灯籠恋の地獄)	Shinzo Nitta	March 2, 2025	10.4%
10	"<Seirō Bijin> no Miru Yume wa" (『青楼美人』の見る夢は)	Taku Ōhara	March 9, 2025	10.6%
11	"Tomimoto, Jingi no Uma-zura" (富本、仁義の馬面)	Takayoshi Kotani	March 16, 2025	9.6%
12	"Niwaka naru <Meigetsu Yojō>" (俄なる『明月余情』)	Takayoshi Kotani	March 23, 2025	9.9%
13	"Oedo Yurugasu Zatōgane" (お江戸揺るがす座頭金)	Takashi Fukagawa	March 30, 2025	9.6%
14	"Tsutajū Segawa Fūfu Dōchū" (蔦重瀬川夫婦道中)	Shinzo Nitta	April 6, 2025	10.8%
15	"Shi o Yobu Tebukuro" (死を呼ぶ手袋)	Taku Ōhara	April 13, 2025	9.9%
16	"Saraba Gennai, Mitate wa Hōrai" (さらば源内、見立は蓬莱)	Taku Ōhara	April 20, 2025	9.6%
17	"Midarezaki Ōrai no Sakura" (乱れ咲き往来の桜)	Takashi Fukagawa	May 4, 2025	9.5%
18	"Utamaro yo, Mirugatoku wa Issui no Yume" (歌麿よ、見徳は一炊夢)	Takayoshi Kotani	May 11, 2025	9.6%
19	"Uroko no Okimiyage" (鱗の置き土産)	Keisuke Ōshima	May 18, 2025	10.2%
20	"Nebokete Sōrō" (寝惚けて候)	Keisuke Ōshima	May 25, 2025	9.7%
21	"Ezo no Sakura Ueno no He no Oto" (蝦夷桜上野屁音)	Taku Ōhara	June 1, 2025	10.0%
22	"Shōsei, Sake no Ue no Furachi nite" (小生、酒上不埒にて)	Takashi Fukagawa	June 8, 2025	9.4%
23	"Ware koso wa Edo-ichi no Kikimono nari" (我こそは江戸一の利者なり)	Takashi Fukagawa	June 15, 2025	8.8%
24	"Geni Tsurenaki wa Nihon-bashi" (げにつれなきは日本橋)	Takayoshi Kotani	June 22, 2025	8.1%
25	"Hai no Ame furu Nihon-bashi" (灰の雨降る日本橋)	Taku Ōhara	June 29, 2025	9.3%
26	"San-nin no Onna" (三人の女)	Taku Ōhara	July 6, 2025	9.8%
27	"Negawakuba Hana no Moto nite Haru Shinan" (願わくば花の下にて春死なん)	Keisuke Ōshima	July 13, 2025	9.3%
28	"Sano Yonaoshi Daimyojin" (佐野世直大明神)	Takashi Fukagawa	July 27, 2025	9.7%
29	"Edo Umare Tsutaya no Adauchi" (江戸生蔦屋仇討)	Hidetaka Terasaki	August 3, 2025	8.8%
30	"Hitomane Utamaro" (人まね歌麿)	Takayoshi Kotani	August 10, 2025	9.4%
31	"Waga Na wa Ten" (我が名は天)	Keisuke Ōshima	August 17, 2025	9.0%
32	"Shinnosuke no Gi" (新之助の義)	Hidetaka Terasaki	August 24, 2025	9.2%
33	"Uchikowashi Entame no Kudoku" (打壊演太女功徳)	Taku Ōhara	August 31, 2025	8.2%
34	"Arigata-yama to Katajike-nasubi" (ありがた山とかたじけ茄子)	Taku Ōhara	September 7, 2025	9.2%
35	"Machigai-dako Bunbu no Futamichi" (間違凧文武二道)	Takayoshi Kotani	September 14, 2025	7.8%
36	"Omu no Keri wa Kamo" (鸚鵡のけりは鴨)	Takashi Fukagawa	September 21, 2025	7.4%
37	"Jigoku ni Kyōden" (地獄に京伝)	Keisuke Ōshima	September 28, 2025	8.9%
38	"Jihon-don'ya Nakamakoto no Hajimari" (地本問屋仲間事之始)	Sumire Terai	October 5, 2025	8.9%
39	"Shirakawa no Kiyoki ni Sumikane Shinshō Hangen" (白河の清きに住みかね身上半減)	Taku Ōhara	October 12, 2025	9.0%
40	"Tsukisenu wa Yoku no Izumi" (尽きせぬは欲の泉)	Takayoshi Kotani	October 19, 2025	8.8%
41	"Utamaro Fudebijin Ōkubi-e" (歌麿筆美人大首絵)	Takashi Fukagawa	October 26, 2025	8.2%
42	"Manekarezaru Kyaku" (招かれざる客)	Yuki Nishio	November 2, 2025	8.4%
43	"Uragiri no Koiuta" (裏切りの恋歌)	Taku Ōhara	November 9, 2025	8.7%
44	"Sora Tobu Gennai" (空飛ぶ源内)	Takashi Fukagawa	November 16, 2025	9.0%
45	"Sono Na wa Sharaku" (その名は写楽)	Takayoshi Kotani	November 23, 2025	8.6%
46	"Soga-matsuri no Hen" (曽我祭の変)	Takashi Fukagawa	November 30, 2025	8.8%
47	"Manjū Kowai" (饅頭こわい)	Taku Ōhara	December 7, 2025	8.4%
48	"Tsutajū Eiga no Yume-banashi" (蔦重栄華乃夢噺)	Taku Ōhara	December 14, 2025	9.5%
Average rating 9.5% - Rating is based on Japanese Video Research (Kantō region).

=== Omnibus ===
Episode	Title	Original airdate	Original airtime
1	"Soshuhen Maki no Ichi" (総集編 巻之一, Vol. 1)	December 29, 2025	12:05 - 13:00
2	"Soshuhen Maki no Ni" (総集編 巻之二, Vol. 2)	December 29, 2025	13:05 - 13:48
3	"Soshuhen Maki no San" (総集編 巻之三, Vol. 3)	December 29, 2025	13:48 - 14:31
4	"Soshuhen Maki no Yon" (総集編 巻之四, Vol. 4)	December 29, 2025	14:31 - 15:15
5	"Soshuhen Maki no Go" (総集編 巻之五, Vol. 5)	December 29, 2025	15:20 - 16:03

== Awards and nominations ==
Award	Category	Recipient(s)	Result	Ref.
18th Tokyo Drama Awards	Best Domestic Series	Unbound	Nominated	
