= Nakamura Kangyoku =

Japanese kubuki actor (born 1996)

Nakamura Kangyoku 初代中村莟玉
- Born: Morimasa Takuma （森正 琢磨） 12 September 1996 (age 29); Tokyo, Japan
- Other name: Nakamura Umemaru

Notes
- Yagō (guild): Takasago-ya

Nakamura Kangyoku (初代中村莟玉, Shodai Nakamura Kangyoku; b. 12 September 1996) is a Japanese kabuki actor and the adopted son of Nakamura Baigyoku IV, (Note: Real Name: Toshiyuki Kawamura (Japanese: 河村 順之, Hepburn: Kawamura Toshiyuki; b. 2 August 1946 in Kanagawa Prefecture, Japan)) one of the most prominent kabuki actors, known for being one of the leading tachiyaku (male role specialists) in kabuki, and a current Living National Treasure.

Nakamura Kangyoku was first introduced to kabuki when his parents, both of whom worked in the publishing industry, brought him to see a play at the age of three. When he was six, he met Nakamura Baigyoku and began helping backstage at the theatre.

Taken under Baigyoku's guidance, he made his stage debut in 2005 under his birth name, playing Tōgashi's page in a production of Kanjinchō. At the same time, he officially became Baigyoku's apprentice, and in 2006, he was granted his first kabuki stage name, Nakamura Umemaru.

In 2019, it was announced that Baigyoku would formally adopt Umemaru as his son and successor. Following the adoption, Umemaru took on the stage name Kangyoku. The "gyoku" (玉) part of the name comes from Baigyoku, while "Kan" (莟) means "bud," a reference to Baigyoku's adoptive father Nakamura Utaemon VI's self-produced theatre program, 莟会 (tsubomi-kai), as "Bai" (梅) in Baigyoku means "plum blossom."

== Filmography ==
=== Television ===
- Unbound (2025), Manjiro

== See also ==
- Nakamura Kanzaburō
