= Nakamura Hayato =

Japanese kabuki actor (born 1993)

- 中村 隼人
- Born: November 30, 1993 (age 31); Tokyo, Japan
- Occupation: Kabuki actor
- Father: Nakamura Kinnosuke II
- Relatives: Nakamura Karoku I (great-great-great-grandfather); Nakamura Karoku III (great-great-grandfather); Nakamura Tokizō III (great-grandfather); Nakamura Tokizō IV (grandfather); Nakamura Tokizō V (uncle); Nakamura Baishi IV (cousin); Nakamura Mantarō (cousin)

Nakamura Hayato I (初代 中村 隼人, Shodai Nakamura Hayato, born 30 November 1993, in Tokyo, Japan) is a Japanese kabuki actor. His trade name is Yorozuya. His mon is the Kirichō.

== Biography ==
Nakamura is the eldest son of Shinjiro Nakamura (currently as Nakamura Kinnosuke II). He debuted at the kabuki-za Sugawara Denju Tenarai Kagami as Kotaro in February 2002. In December 2007 Nakamura won the National Theatre of Japan Special Award for his role as Sachi in Horibe Yahee.

== Filmography ==
=== Kabuki ===
Title	Role	Notes	Ref.
Kanjinchō	Tachimochi		
Nīkuchimura	Tōmi no Chūbee		
Hinata Shima Kagekiyo	Itodaki		
Kaga Miyama Kyū Nishikie	Daihime		
Kago Tsurube	Hachibbashi-tsuki Chaya Mawari		
Genroku Chūshingura	Isekimon Saemon		
Kikubatake	Koshimoto Shiragiku		
Yakko Dōjōji	Shoke		
Kabuki Kanshō Kyōshitsu			
Kabuki no Mikata			

=== TV series ===
Year	Title	Role	Notes	Ref.
2009	Kagerō no Tsuji Inemuri Iwane Edo Zōshi	Tokugawa Iemoto	Episodes 5 and 6	
2010	Ryōmaden	Tokugawa Iemochi	Taiga drama	
2013	Yae's Sakura	Matsudaira Sadaaki	Taiga drama	
2013	Pin to Kona	Flower shop worker	Episode 1	
2016	Seisei Suru Hodo, Aishiteru	Atsushi Kuno		
2025	Unbound	Hasegawa Heizo	Taiga drama	

== Publications ==
Year	Title	Ref.
2015	Nakamura Hayato First Photo Book: Hayato	
