= Dayu Koume =

Japanese comedian

- コウメ 太夫
- Born: Takashi Akai; April 20, 1972 (age 53); Suginami, Tokyo, Japan
- Education: Asahikawa University
- Occupation: Comedian
- Years active: 1995–
- Agent: SMA Neet Project
- Known for: Enta no Kami-sama
- Height: 1.76 m (5 ft 9 in)
- Relatives: Keiko Fukami (mother)

Takashi Akai (赤 井貴, Akai Takashi; born April 20, 1972, in Suginami, Tokyo, Japan), better known as Dayu Koume (コウメ 太夫, Kōme Dayū), is a Japanese comedian represented by SMA Neet Project. He dropped out from Asahikawa University.

== Filmography ==
=== Variety show ===
Year	Title	Notes	Ref.
2005–2010	Enta no Kami-sama		

=== Film ===
Year	Title	Role	Notes	Ref.
2022	Ginji the Speculator			

=== Television drama ===
Year	Title	Role	Notes	Ref.
2025	Unbound	Naniwaya	Taiga drama	
