= International Buddhist Film Festival =

The International Buddhist Film Festival (IBFF) is a presenter of Buddhist-themed and Buddhist-inspired cinema. IBFF includes films of all kinds: dramas, documentaries, comedies, animation, experimental work, children's films, music videos, and television programs.

IBFF offers film as a way for general audiences to develop a wider appreciation and better understanding of Buddhist philosophy, traditions, arts, and practices (including mindfulness). Works to be exhibited are chosen through program committee invitations as well as through an international open call for entries (CFE) that allows independent filmmakers to submit their work for consideration. Films include English language or subtitled works from all over the world. Over twenty nations have been represented by films in IBFF events.

IBFF has presented various level premieres of works by Werner Herzog, Khyentse Norbu, Doris Dörrie, Jang Sun-woo, Lesley Ann Patton, Im Kwon Taek, Babeth VanLoo, Lee Chang-jae, Rebecca Dreyfus, David Grubin, Ken Burns, Pawo Choyning Dorji, Pema Tseden, Dechen Roder, Werner Penzel, and others.

IBFF has been presented by host institutions in cities on three continents: Los Angeles 2003, Washington, D.C. 2004, San Francisco 2005, Amsterdam 2006, Singapore 2007, Mexico City 2008, London 2009, San Francisco and Washington, D.C. 2010, Washington, D.C. (at BuddhaFest) 2011, London, Hong Kong, and Bangkok 2012, Vancouver, BC 2013, Washington, D.C. (at BuddaFest) 2014, San Francisco 2015, San Francisco 2016, San Francisco and Los Angeles (at BuddhaFest) 2017, San Francisco, Los Angeles (at BuddhaFest), and Washington, D.C. 2018, San Francisco and Los Angeles (at BuddhaFest) 2019, San Francisco 2021, and Barcelona (with FCBC) 2022. Two special festivals were organized by IBFF: the Benefit Nepal Film Festival (2015) and two editions of the Burma Spring Benefit Film Festival (2021/22).

Presenting partners for film festivals and other public programs have included Los Angeles County Museum of Art, Smithsonian Institution (Washington, DC), Barbican Centre (London), Samaya Foundation (Mexico City), Buddhist Film Festival Europe (BFFE) Amsterdam (the Netherlands), UC Berkeley, Asia Buddhist Film Festival Pvt. Ltd. (Singapore), California Film Institute (SF), Fowler Museum (LA), Rubin Museum of Art (NY), Vancouver International Film Centre (BC), Asia Society (Hong Kong), and Yerba Buena Center for the Arts (SF).

IBFF has also co-presented programs with other film festivals including Seattle International, San Francisco International, CAAMFest (SF), Asian American (NY), Human Rights Watch (NY/SF/London), I See Films (Milan), Indian Film Festival of LA, SF Latino, Mill Valley Film Festival (SF), San Francisco Silent, and Dharamshala International Film Festival (India).

== History ==
IBFF is the primary public program of Buddhist Film Foundation, Inc. (BFF), an independent educational nonprofit that was founded in 2000 (as the Buddhist Film Society) with the aim of using modern media as a tool for exploring contemporary Buddhist issues and ideas. Founding Advisory Council members include Alice Walker, Richard Gere, Joanna Macy, Rudy Wurlitzer, Lisa Lu, Peter Coyote, Pico Iyer, Philip Glass, Huston Smith. As BFF executive director Gaetano Kazuo Maida said in a 2000 interview (Inquiring Mind Magazine), "Film can open the minds of people who would never cross the threshold of a Zen meditation hall, or even a public lecture… BFF’s main goal is to be a resource, serving filmmakers and educators as well as audiences."

For the years 2005-2018, BFF offered festival-selected filmmakers a home video distribution service, Festival Media (FM). FM licensed twenty titles, and designed and produced, and distributed through retailers in North America, over 100,000 DVDs. FM was discontinued once the DVD was eclipsed by online streaming. BFF is currently developing its own streaming platform, Buddhist Film Channel, with a projected launch in 2023.
