= Nakamura Kankurō VI =

Japanese actor (born 1981)

Nakamura Kankurō VI 六代目 中村 勘九郎
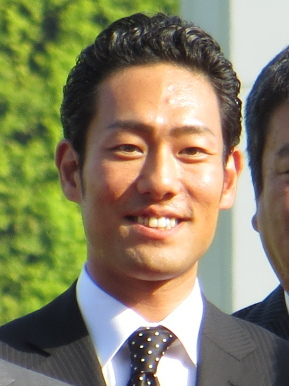
- Born: Masayuki Namino; 31 October 1981 (age 44); Tokyo, Japan
- Other name: Nakamuraya
- Occupation: Actor
- Years active: 2001–present
- Spouse: Ai Maeda (m. 2009)
- Children: Nakamura Kantarō III (eldest son); Nakamura Chōzaburō II (youngest son)
- Father: Nakamura Kanzaburō XVIII
- Relatives: Nakamura Kanzaburō XVII (grandfather); Nakamura Shikan VII (grandfather.); Nakamura Shichinosuke II (younger brother)

Nakamura Kankurō VI (六代目 中村 勘九郎, Rokudaime Nakamura Kankurō; born 31 October 1981) is a Japanese kabuki and film and television actor. Born Masayuki Namino (波野 雅行, Namino Masayuki), he is a tachiyaku actor (kabuki actor who plays male roles) like his father Nakamura Kanzaburō XVIII and his younger brother Nakamura Shichinosuke II.

== Names and lineage ==
Kankurō is a member of the acting guild Nakamura-ya. His family has performed kabuki going back to Onoe Kikugorō III and Ichimura Uzaemon XI, who performed in the early 19th century.

== Life and career ==
Kankurō also works in television and film. In 2004, he played Tōdō Heisuke in the NHK Taiga drama Shinsengumi!. He starred in the 2001 Japanese film Turn and the 2009 film Zen, in which he played the monk Dōgen.

== Filmography ==
=== Films ===
- Turn (2001), Yohei Izumi
- Zen (2009), Dōgen
- The Kiyosu Conference (2013), Oda Nobutada
- Sanada 10 Braves (2016), Sarutobi Sasuke
- Gintama (2017), Isao Kondō
- Gintama 2 (2018), Isao Kondō
- Pocket Monsters the Movie: Coco (2020), Zarude (voice)
- Shin Gekijōban Keroro Gunsō: Fukkatsu Shite Sokkō Chikyū Metsubō no Kiki de Arimasu! (2026), Isao Kondō (voice)

=== Television ===
- Shinsengumi! (2004), Tōdō Heisuke
- Aka Medaka (2013), Nakamura Kanzaburō XVIII
- Idaten (2019), Shiso Kanakuri
- Nakamura Nakazo: Shusse no Kizahashi (2021), Nakamura Nakazo I
- What Will You Do, Ieyasu? (2023), Chaya Shirōjirō Kiyonobu and Chaya Shirōjirō Kiyotada

== See also ==
- Nakamura Kanzaburō
