= Kiharu Nakamura =

Japanese writer and geisha

- Born: April 13, 1913
- Died: January 5, 2004 (aged 90)
- Occupation: Essayist

Kiharu Nakamura (中村 喜春, Nakamura Kiharu; April 14, 1913 – January 5, 2004) was an essayist and former geisha.

== Biography ==
Nakamura was born on April 14, 1913, in Hokkaido or Tokyo, Japan. Her birth name was Kazuko Yamamoto.

In 1929, at age of 16, she became a geisha at a geisha house in Shinbashi. She learned English, and gained a reputation as the first English-speaking geisha. Some of her clients included Babe Ruth, Jean Cocteau, and Charlie Chaplin. Nakamura was also the first woman in Japan to get a pilot's license.

She worked until 27 years old, when she married Shintaro Ota in 1940, a Japanese diplomat, and moved with him to Kolkata, India. Nakamura divorced Ota soon after giving birth to her son, and they returned to Japan in 1942. She then married Masaya Nakamura, a photographer.

After divorcing Masaya Nakamura in 1956, Nakamura moved to the United States. She consulted on many operas, books, and films about geisha life, including productions of Madame Butterfly and Arthur Golden's Memoirs of a Geisha. Nakamura also worked to change misconceptions about geisha. She lived in New York City until her death in 2004.

== Selected bibliography ==
- Nakamura, Kiharu (1983). Edokko geisha ichidaiki [Biography of an Edo geisha]. Soshisha. ISBN 9784794201775.
- Nakamura, Kiharu (1985). ああ情なや日本 : 江戸っ子芸者の30年ぶりの日本. Soshisha. ISBN 9784794202239.
- Nakamura, Kiharu (1987). あたしはアメリカが好き [I like America]. Soshisha. ISBN 9784794202789.
