= Rikkō Nakamura =

Japanese photographer

Rikkō Nakamura (中村 立行, Nakamura Rikkō; 1912–1995) was a renowned Japanese photographer.
