= Zhongcun station =

Zhongcun station may refer to:

- Zhongcun station (Guangzhou Metro), a station on Line 7 of the Guangzhou Metro in Guangdong, China
- Zhongcun station (Hangzhou Metro), a station on Line 6 of the Hangzhou Metro in Zhejiang, China
