= PhotoCON =

Japanese photography magazine

PhotoCON (フォトコン, Fotokon) is a Japanese photography magazine that emphasizes the participation of and contests for its readers. Its title alludes to "photo contest".

The magazine has a complex history. Photo Contest (フォトコンテスト, Foto Kontesuto) was a monthly magazine whose first issue was dated September 1956. This turned into the much more ambitious and very different Camera Age (カメラ時代, Kamera Jidai), a monthly magazine that ran from January 1966 till January 1967. The earlier magazine returned as the twice-monthly Junkan Foto Kontesuto (旬刊フォトコンテスト) from May 1967, from January 1968 till October 1973 Gekkan Foto Kontesuto (月刊フォトコンテスト) and from January 1974 until December 2007 Japan Photo Contest Monthly (formally 日本フォトコンテスト, Nihon Foto Kontesuto; normally フォトコンテスト, Foto Kontesuto).

== Sources ==
- Shirayama Mari. "Major Photography Magazines". In The History of Japanese Photography, ed. Ann Wilkes Tucker, et al. New Haven: Yale University Press, 2003. ISBN 0-300-09925-8. Pp. 384 (on Camera Jidai).
- (in Japanese) Shirayama Mari (白山眞理). Shashin zasshi no kiseki (写真雑誌の軌跡, "Traces of camera magazines"). Tokyo: JCII Library, 2001. NCID BB04894896P. 18.
