= Nakamura Utaemon V =

Japanese kabuki performer (1865–1940)

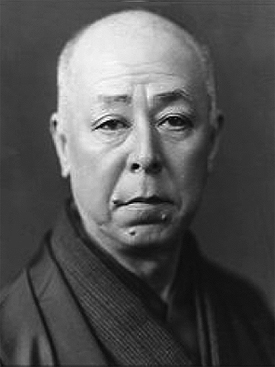
- Born: 1865; Tokyo, Japan
- Died: September 11, 1940 (aged 74–75)
- Spouse: Tama Kawamura
- Children: Nakamura Fukusuke V (son); Nakamura Utaemon VI (son)
- Parent: Nakamura Shikan IV (adoptive father)
- Relatives: Nakamura Shikan VII (grandson); Nakamura Fukusuke IX (great-grandson); Nakamura Shikan VIII (great-grandson); Nakamura Kankurō VI (great-great-grandson); Nakamura Shichinosuke II (great-great-grandson); Nakamura Kōtarō VI (great-great-grandson); Nakamura Hashinosuke IV (great-great-grandson); Nakamura Fukunosuke III (great-great-grandson); Nakamura Utanosuke IV (great-great-grandson); Nakamura Kantarō III (great-great-great-grandson); Nakamura Chōzaburō II (great-great-great-grandson)

Nakamura Utaemon V (Note: Real Name: Hidetaro Nakamura (Japanese: 中村榮太郎, Hepburn: Nakamura Hidetaro).) (中村歌右衛門 (5代目); 1865 — September 11, 1940) was a Japanese kabuki performer and "dean of kabuki actors at the Kabuki-za in Tokyo". He was a prominent member of a family of kabuki actors from the Keihanshin region.

Nakamura Utaemon was a stage name with significant cultural and historical connotations.

== Life and career ==
Utaemon V was the artistic heir of Nakamura Utaemon IV. He was born in the fifth generation of a line of famous Kabuki actors. In the conservative Kabuki world, stage names are passed from father to son in a formal system which converts the kabuki stage name into a mark of accomplishment.

Lineage of Utaemon stage names

- Nakamura Utaemon I (1714–1791)
- Nakamura Utaemon II (1752-1798)
- Nakamura Utaemon III (1778-1838)
- Nakamura Utaemon IV (1798-1852)
- Nakamura Utaemon V (1865-1940)
- Nakamura Utaemon VI (1917-2001)

In a long career, he played many roles; but he was best known for his oyama or onnagata roles.

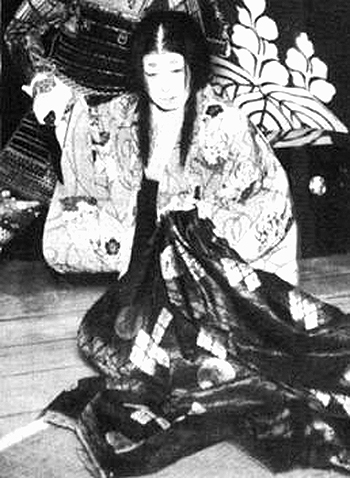
Utaemon V as Yodo-gimi in the kabuki play Hototogisu Kojō no Rakugetsu

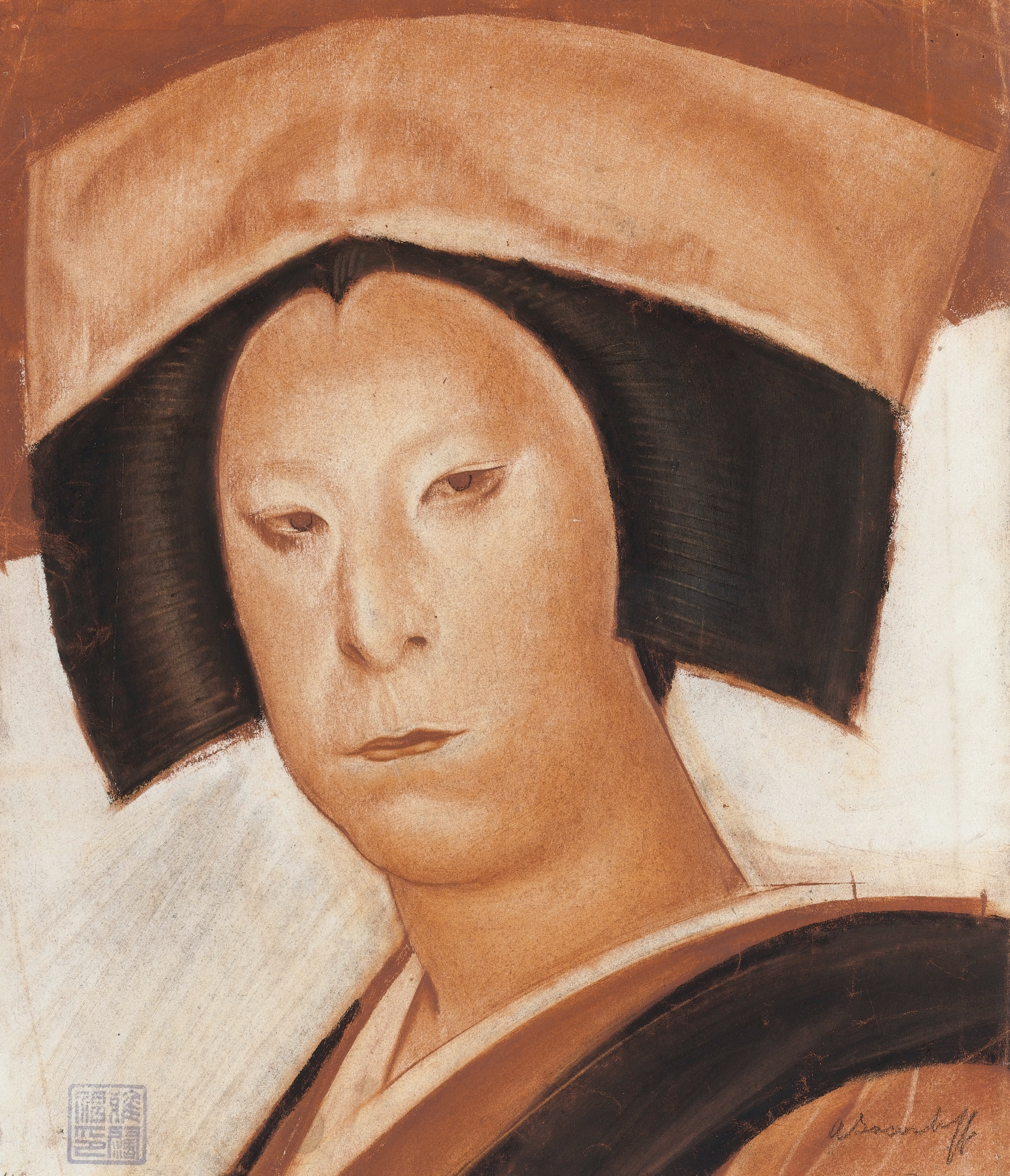
Sanguine and charcoal drawing by Alexander Yakovlev of Utaemon V dressed as a young bride for the marriage ceremony

== Selected works ==
In a statistical overview derived from writings by and about Nakamura Utaemon VI, OCLC/WorldCat encompasses roughly 7 works in 7 publications in 2 languages and 20+ library holdings.

- 1950 — Styles of Acting in Kabuki (歌舞伎の型, kabuki no kata) OCLC 033711674
- 1935 — Autobiography of Nakamura Utaemon Gosei (歌右衛門自傅, utaemon jiten). OCLC 44435876

== See also ==
- Shūmei

== Bibliography ==
- Leiter, Samuel L. (2006). Historical Dictionary of Japanese Traditional Theatre. Lanham, Maryland: Scarecrow Press. ISBN 978-0-8108-5527-4; OCLC 238637010
- __________. ( 2002). A Kabuki Reader: History and Performance. ISBN 9780765607041; ISBN 9780765607058; OCLC 182632867
- Nussbaum, Louis Frédéric and Käthe Roth. (2005). Japan Encyclopedia. Cambridge: Harvard University Press. ISBN 978-0-674-01753-5; OCLC 48943301
- Scott, Adolphe Clarence. (1955). The Kabuki Theatre of Japan. London: Allen & Unwin. OCLC 622644114

=== Further reading ===
- 中村歌右衛門. (1935). Autobiography of Nakamura Utaemon V (歌右衛門自伝, utaemon jiden). Tokyo: Shūhōen Publishing (秋豊園出版部, shūhōen shuppanbu).
