= Nakamura Nakazo I =

Kabuki actor (1736 – 1790)

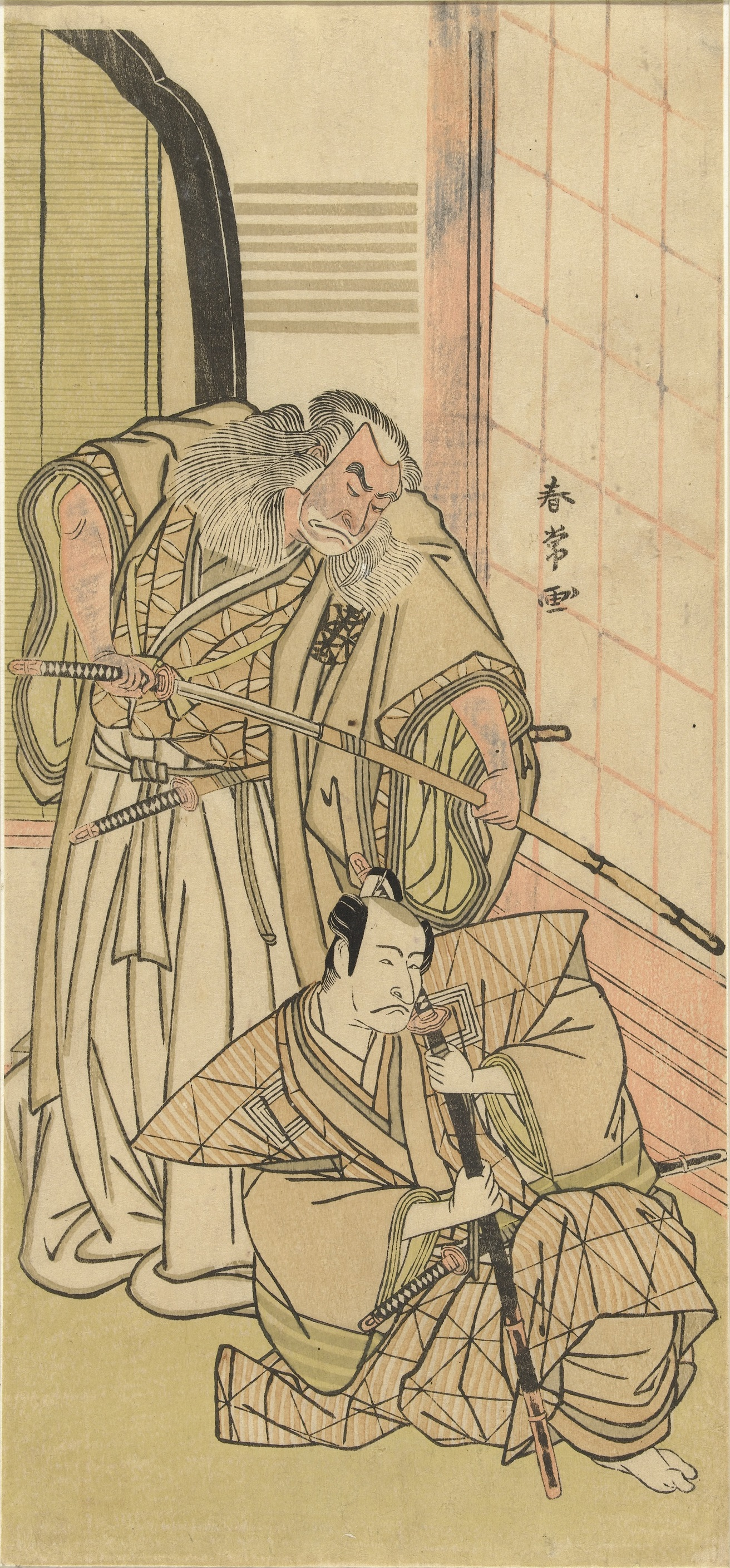
- Nakamura Nakazo I and Ichikawa Danjuro V noblemen (by Katsukawa Shunjō)
- Born: 1736; Edo
- Died: June 6, 1790 (aged 53–54); Edo

Nakazō I Nakamura (1736 – June 6, 1790) , also known as Hidetsuru or Sakaeya, was a Japanese kabuki actor.

Nakamura was born in Edo.

He started playing villains at the Nakamura theater, then performed at the Ichimura theater, inventing a new acting style since known as Hidetsuru. He eventually became master of the Shigayama School of Dancing, introducing male roles in the shosagoto dances.

Nakamura died in Edo.

== Works ==
- Tsuki-yuki-hana nemonogatari ("Moon, Snow, and Flowers: Sweet Nothings"), his autobiography
- Hidetsuru nikki (Essays)
