= Hayata, Afghanistan =

Hayata
- Location in Afghanistan
- Coordinates: 36°59′54″N 66°45′43″E
- Country: Afghanistan
- Province: Balkh Province
- Time zone: + 4.30

Hayata is a village in Balkh Province in northern Afghanistan.

== See also ==
- Balkh Province
