= Nakamura Ichiroemon =

Japanese swordsman

Nakamura Ichiroemon a notable swordsman during the Edo period (17th century) of Japan. Ichiroemon had been primarily renowned for being the senior disciple of the famous lancer, Hōzō-in Inei. After the monk known as Inei deemed his vocation not of the martial arts, Inei passed all of his weapons on to Ichiroemon. One student of note that later become one with Ichiroemons's school of Hozoin, was Takada Matabei. Throughout many years afterwards, Ichiroemon would remain as the leader of the Hozoin school of swordsmanship, training Matabei to his fullest in the art of the lance.
