= Nakamura Utaemon IV =

Japanese kabuki performer (1798–1852)

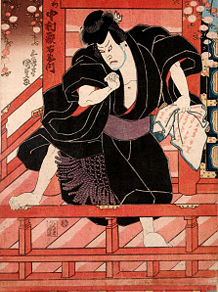
- Nakamura Utaemon IV in the role of Ishikawa Goemon. Ukiyo-e print by Utagawa Kunisada, c. 1838
- Born: 1798; Edo, Japan
- Died: 1852 (aged 53–54)

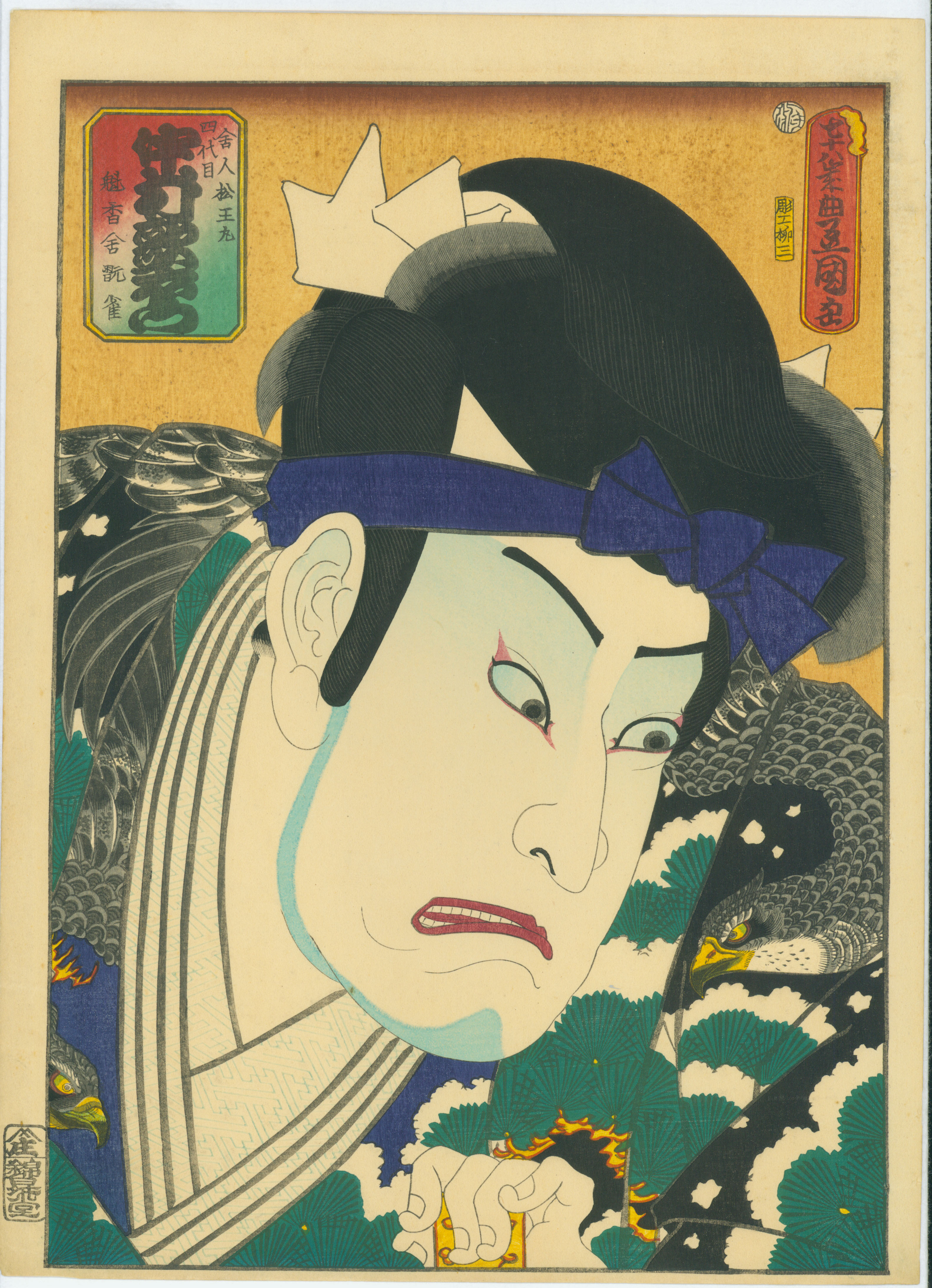
Utagawa Kunisada, Nakamura Utaemon IV as Matsuomaru, 1863, Princeton University Art Museum

Nakamura Utaemon IV (中村歌右衛門 (4代目); 1798–1852) was a Japanese kabuki performer. He was a prominent member of a family of kabuki actors from the Keihanshin region.

Nakamura Utaemon was a stage name with significant cultural and historical connotations.

== Life and career ==
Utaemon IV was believed to be the artistic heir of Nakamura Utaemon III. In the conservative Kabuki world, stage names are passed from father to son in formal system which converts the kabuki stage name into a mark of accomplishment.

Lineage of Utaemon stage names

- Nakamura Utaemon I (1714–1791)
- Nakamura Utaemon II (1752-1798)
- Nakamura Utaemon III (1778–1838)
- Nakamura Utaemon IV (1798–1852)
- Nakamura Utaemon V (1865–1940)
- Nakamura Utaemon VI (1917–2001)

In a long career, he acted in many roles including Ishikawa Goemon in the 1838 Edo Nakamura-za production of Sanmon Hitome Senbon.

== See also ==
- Shūmei

== Bibliography ==
- Leiter, Samuel L. (2006). Historical Dictionary of Japanese Traditional Theatre. Lanham, Maryland: Scarecrow Press. ISBN 978-0-8108-5527-4; OCLC 238637010
- __________. ( 2002). A Kabuki Reader: History and Performance. ISBN 9780765607041; ISBN 9780765607058; OCLC 182632867
- Nussbaum, Louis Frédéric and Käthe Roth. (2005). Japan Encyclopedia. Cambridge: Harvard University Press. ISBN 978-0-674-01753-5; OCLC 48943301
- Scott, Adolphe Clarence. (1955). The Kabuki Theatre of Japan. London: Allen & Unwin. OCLC 622644114
