= Nakamura Utaemon III =

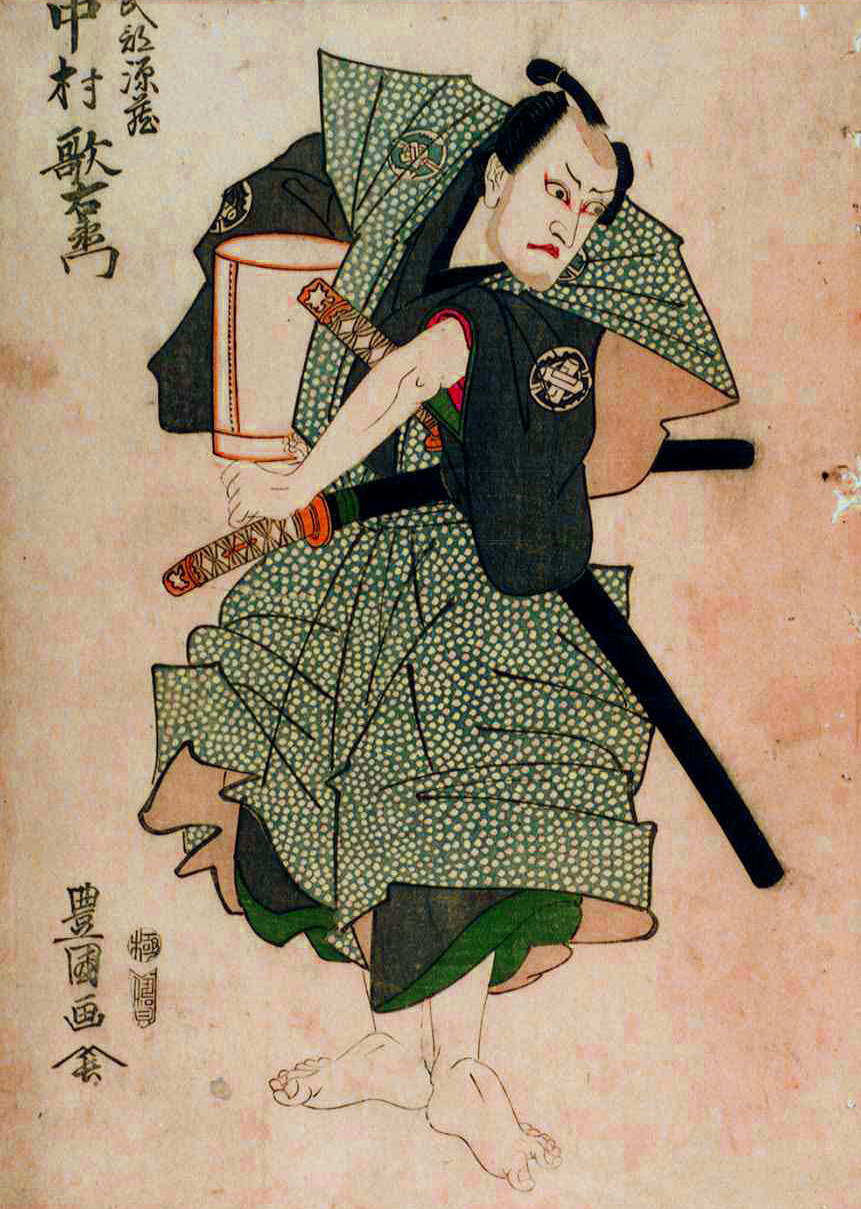
- Nakamura Utaemon III in the role of Genzō Takebe. Woodblock print by Toyokuni Utagawa, early 19th century
- Born: 1778; Osaka, Japan
- Died: 1838 (aged 59–60)

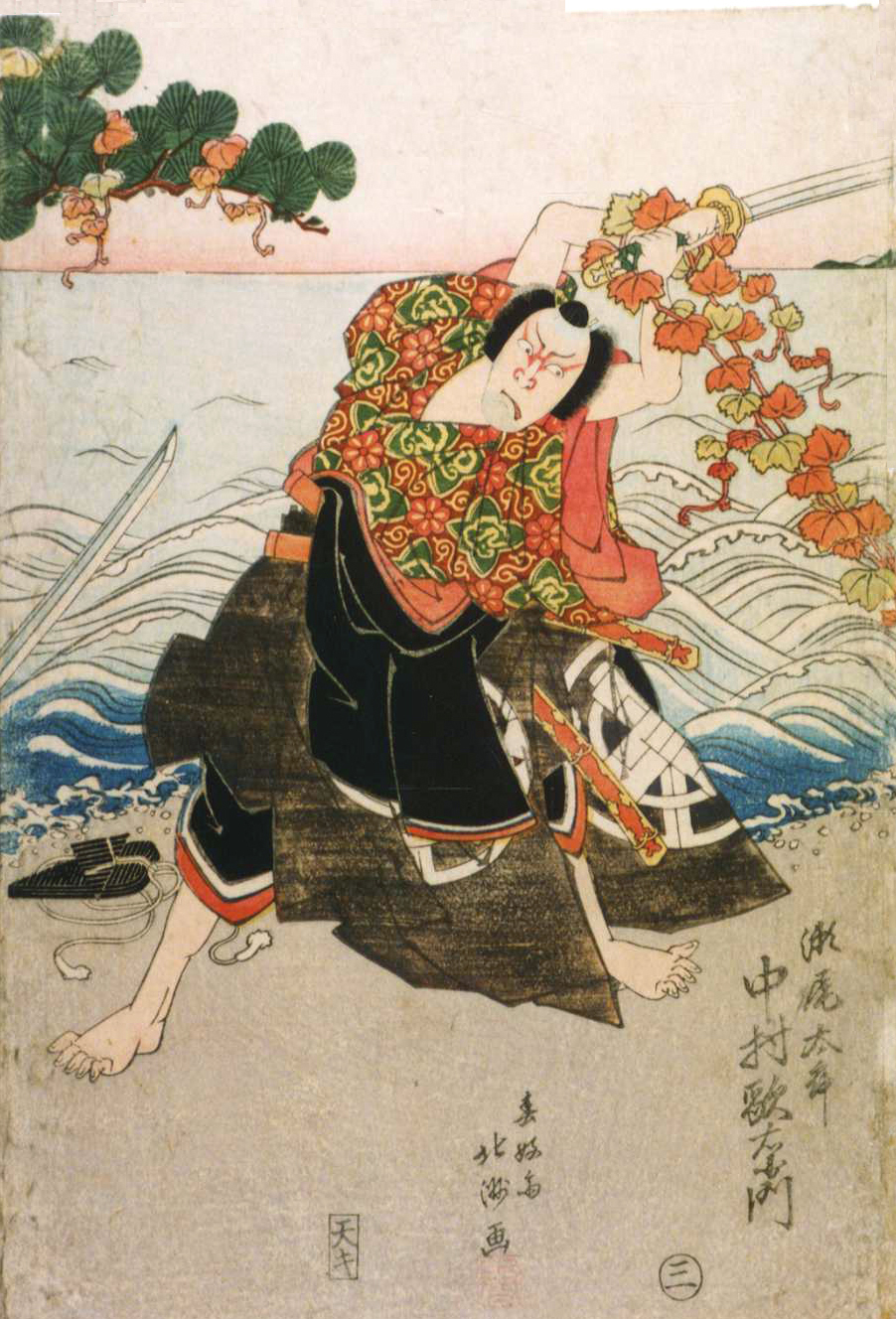
Nakamura Utaemon III in the role of Seno-o no Tarō. Ukiyo-e print by Shunkōsai Hokushū, c. 1824

Nakamura Utaemon III (中村歌右衛門 (3代目); 1778–1838) was a Japanese kabuki performer. He was a prominent member of a family of kabuki actors from the Keihanshin region.

Nakamura Utaemon was a stage name with significant cultural and historical connotations.

== Life and career ==
Utaemon III was the natural son of Nakamura Utaemon I. In 1782, his father presented the name Utaemon II to a favored apprentice, however the name was later retrieved (or abandoned) in 1790. Then the name was bestowed on his son, who kept it and later passed it on to his son who became Utaemon IV. In the conservative Kabuki world, stage names are passed from father to son in a formal system which converts the kabuki stage name into a mark of accomplishment.

Lineage of Utaemon stage names

- Nakamura Utaemon I (1714–1791)
- Nakamura Utaemon II (1752-1798)
- Nakamura Utaemon III (1778–1838)
- Nakamura Utaemon IV (1798–1852)
- Nakamura Utaemon V (1865–1940)
- Nakamura Utaemon VI (1917–2001)

In a long career, he acted in many kabuki plays, including the role of Seno-o no Tarō in the September 1824 production of Heike Nyōgo-ga-shima at Osaka Sumi-za.

== Selected works ==
In a statistical overview derived from writings by and about Nakamura Utaemon VI, OCLC/WorldCat encompasses roughly 10+ works in 10+ publications in 1 language and 30+ library holdings.

- 1936 — - (會色さくら, Eshiki sakura) OCLC 037048749

== See also ==
- Shūmei

== Bibliography ==
- Leiter, Samuel L. (2006). Historical Dictionary of Japanese Traditional Theatre. Lanham, Maryland: Scarecrow Press. ISBN 978-0-8108-5527-4; OCLC 238637010
- __________. ( 2002). A Kabuki Reader: History and Performance. ISBN 9780765607041; ISBN 9780765607058; OCLC 182632867
- Nussbaum, Louis Frédéric and Käthe Roth. (2005). Japan Encyclopedia. Cambridge: Harvard University Press. ISBN 978-0-674-01753-5; OCLC 48943301
- Scott, Adolphe Clarence. (1955). The Kabuki Theatre of Japan. London: Allen & Unwin. OCLC 622644114
