= Yūji Hayata =

Japanese photographer

Yūji Hayata (早田 雄二, Hayata Yūji; 30 August 1916 – 3 March 1995) was a Japanese photographer.
