= Tomohiko Nakamura =

Japanese vert skater

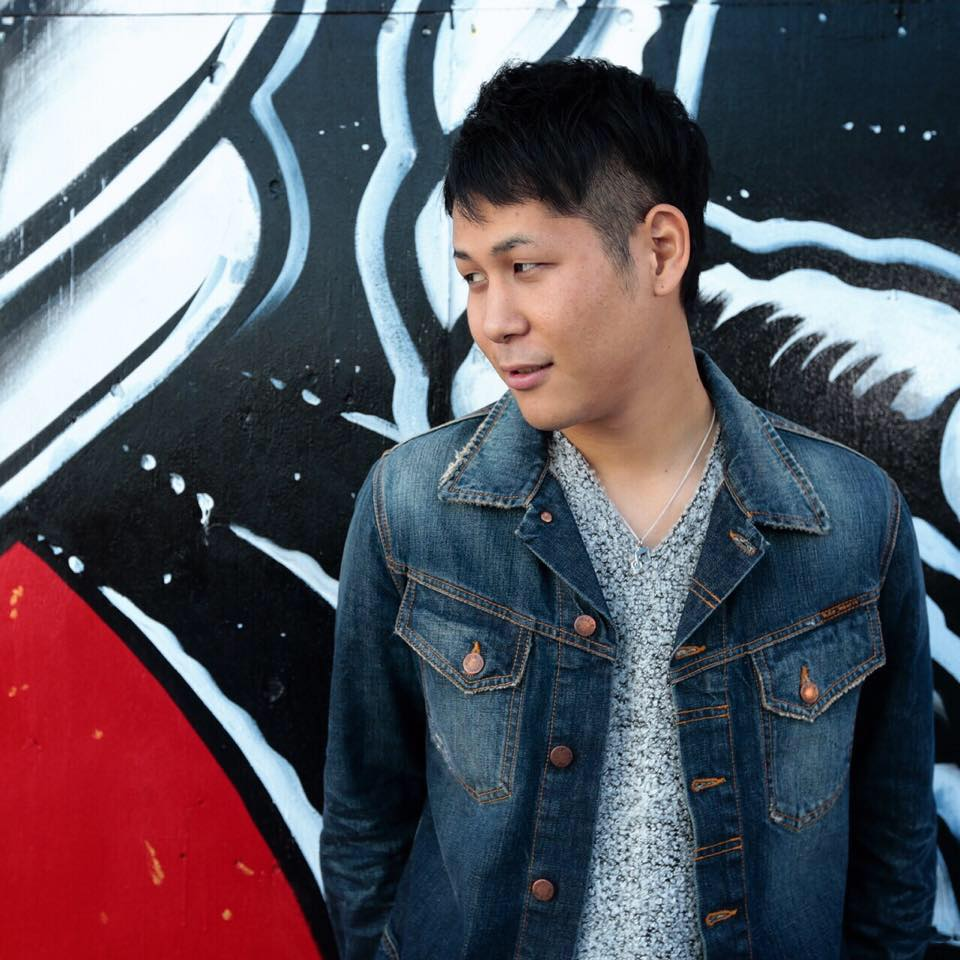

Personal information
- Nationality: Japanese
- Born: July 29, 1991 (age 34) Osaka, Japan
- Education: Kansai University
- Height: 1.75 m (5 ft 9 in)

Sport
- Sport: Vert skating
Medal record
Competitions
Silver medal – second place	2015 JASPA, Japan	Vert
Silver medal – second place	2013 AIL, USA	Vert
Silver medal – second place	2013 JASPA, Japan	Vert
Silver medal – second place	2008 JASPA, Japan	Vert
Bronze medal – third place	2006 Asian X Games, Malaysia	Vert
Gold medal – first place	2005 LG Amateur Championships, England	Vert
Gold medal – first place	2005 JASPA, Japan	Vert
Gold medal – first place	2004 JASPA, Japan	Vert
Representing Japan

Tomohiko Nakamura (中村 友彦, Nakamura Tomohiko) is a Japanese professional vert skater. Tomohiko started skating when he was five years old in 1996 and turned professional in 2005. He has attended many competitions in his vert skating career.

Best tricks: Flatspin 540

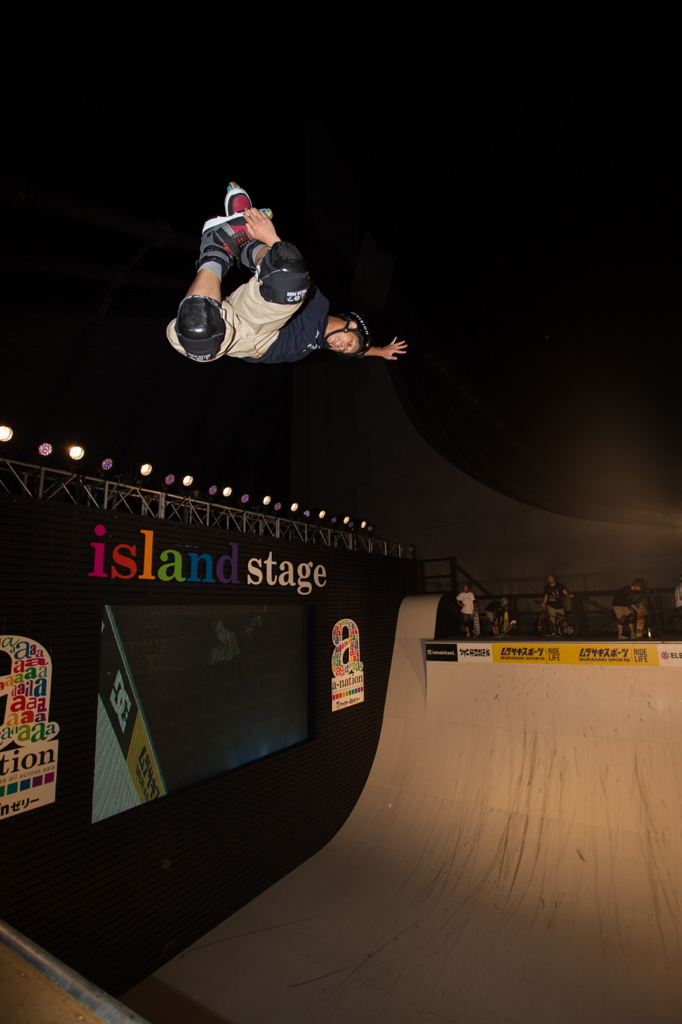
Tomohiko vert skating

== Competitions ==
- 2015 JASPA, Japan - Vert: 2nd
- 2013 AIL, Woodward West, USA - Vert: 2nd
- 2011 Euro Championships, Rotterdam, Netherlands - Vert: 4th
- 2013 JASPA, Japan - Vert: 2nd
- 2011 Asian X Games, Shanghai, China - Vert: 6th
- 2011 World Leisure Cup, Chunchon, Korea - Vert: 4th
- 2010 Asian X Games, Shanghai, China - Vert: 6th
- 2008 JAPSA, Japan - Vert: 2nd
- 2008 Asian X Games, Shanghai, China - Vert: 7th
- 2007 LG Action Sports Championships, Dallas, USA - Vert: 11th
- 2006 Asian X Games, Kuala Lumpur, Malaysia - Vert: 3rd
- 2005 Asian X Games, Seoul, Korea - Vert: 5th
- 2005 LG Amateur Championships, Manchester, England - Vert: 1st
- 2005 JASPA, Japan - Vert 1st
- 2004 JASPA, Japan - Vert 1st
