= Nakamura Utaemon II =

Japanese kabuki performer

- Born: 1752
- Died: 1798 (aged 45–46)

Nakamura Utaemon II (中村歌右衛門 (2代目); 1752–1798) was a Japanese kabuki performer in the lineage of a family of kabuki actors from the Keihanshin region.

Nakamura Utaemon is a stage name.

== Life and career ==
In 1782, Utaemon I presented this name to a favored apprentice, who was formerly known as Mizuki Tōzō or Nakamura Tōzō. Tōzō had already appeared in many kabuki plays, including the role of Kamura in the 1781 production of Hinin no Kataakiuchi. In the conservative Kabuki world, stage names are conveyed in formal system which converts the kabuki stage name into a mark of accomplishment.

Utaemon II abandoned his name in 1790; and he performed as Nakamura Tōzō for the rest of his life. The natural son of Nakamura Utaemon I would become Utaemon III in the lineage of the actor formerly known as Utaemon II.

Lineage of Utaemon stage names

- Nakamura Utaemon I (1714–1791)
- Nakamura Utaemon II (1752-1798)
- Nakamura Utaemon III (1778–1838)
- Nakamura Utaemon IV (1798–1852)
- Nakamura Utaemon V (1865–1940)
- Nakamura Utaemon VI (1917–2001)

== See also ==
- Shūmei

== Bibliography ==
- Leiter, Samuel L. (2006). Historical Dictionary of Japanese Traditional Theatre. Lanham, Maryland: Scarecrow Press. ISBN 978-0-8108-5527-4; OCLC 238637010
- __________. ( 2002). A Kabuki Reader: History and Performance. ISBN 9780765607041; ISBN 9780765607058; OCLC 182632867
- Nussbaum, Louis Frédéric and Käthe Roth. (2005). Japan Encyclopedia. Cambridge: Harvard University Press. ISBN 978-0-674-01753-5; OCLC 48943301
- Scott, Adolphe Clarence. (1955). The Kabuki Theatre of Japan. London: Allen & Unwin. OCLC 622644114
