= Nakamura Utaemon I =

Japanese kabuki performer (1714–1791)

- Nakamura Utaemon I, a caricature published in Osaka in 1780
- Born: 1714; Kanazawa, Ishikawa, Japan
- Died: 1791 (aged 76–77)
- Children: Nakamura Utaemon III (son); Nakamura Utanosuke II (adopted son)
- Relatives: Kagaya Hashinosuke I (grandson); Nakamura Shikan III (great-grandson); Nakamura Tamashichi I (great-great-grandson); Nakamura Tsurusuke V (great-great-grandson)

Nakamura Utaemon I (中村歌右衛門 (初代); 1714–1791) was a Japanese kabuki performer. He was the progenitor of a family of kabuki actors from the Keihanshin region. He was the son of a provincial doctor. As a youth, he decided to join a troupe of actors; and this was the beginning of a long career.

Nakamura Utaemon was a stage name with significant cultural and historical connotations.

== Life and career ==
In 1782, Utaemon presented the name Utaemon II to a favored apprentice; but the name was later retrieved (or abandoned) in 1790. Then the name was bestowed on his son, who kept it. Utaemon III was the natural son of Nakamura Utaemon I.

In the conservative Kabuki world, stage names are passed from father to son in formal system which converts the kabuki stage name into a mark of accomplishment.

Lineage of Utaemon stage names

- Nakamura Utaemon I (1714–1791)
- Nakamura Utaemon II (1752-1798)
- Nakamura Utaemon III (1778–1838)
- Nakamura Utaemon IV (1798–1852)
- Nakamura Utaemon V (1865–1940)
- Nakamura Utaemon VI (1917–2001)

== See also ==
- Shūmei

== Bibliography ==
- Leiter, Samuel L. (2006). Historical Dictionary of Japanese Traditional Theatre. Lanham, Maryland: Scarecrow Press. ISBN 978-0-8108-5527-4; OCLC 238637010
- __________. ( 2002). A Kabuki Reader: History and Performance. ISBN 9780765607041; ISBN 9780765607058; OCLC 182632867
- Nussbaum, Louis Frédéric and Käthe Roth. (2005). Japan Encyclopedia. Cambridge: Harvard University Press. ISBN 978-0-674-01753-5; OCLC 48943301
- Scott, Adolphe Clarence. (1955). The Kabuki Theatre of Japan. London: Allen & Unwin. OCLC 622644114
