= Nakamura Utaemon VI =

Japanese kabuki performer and artistic director

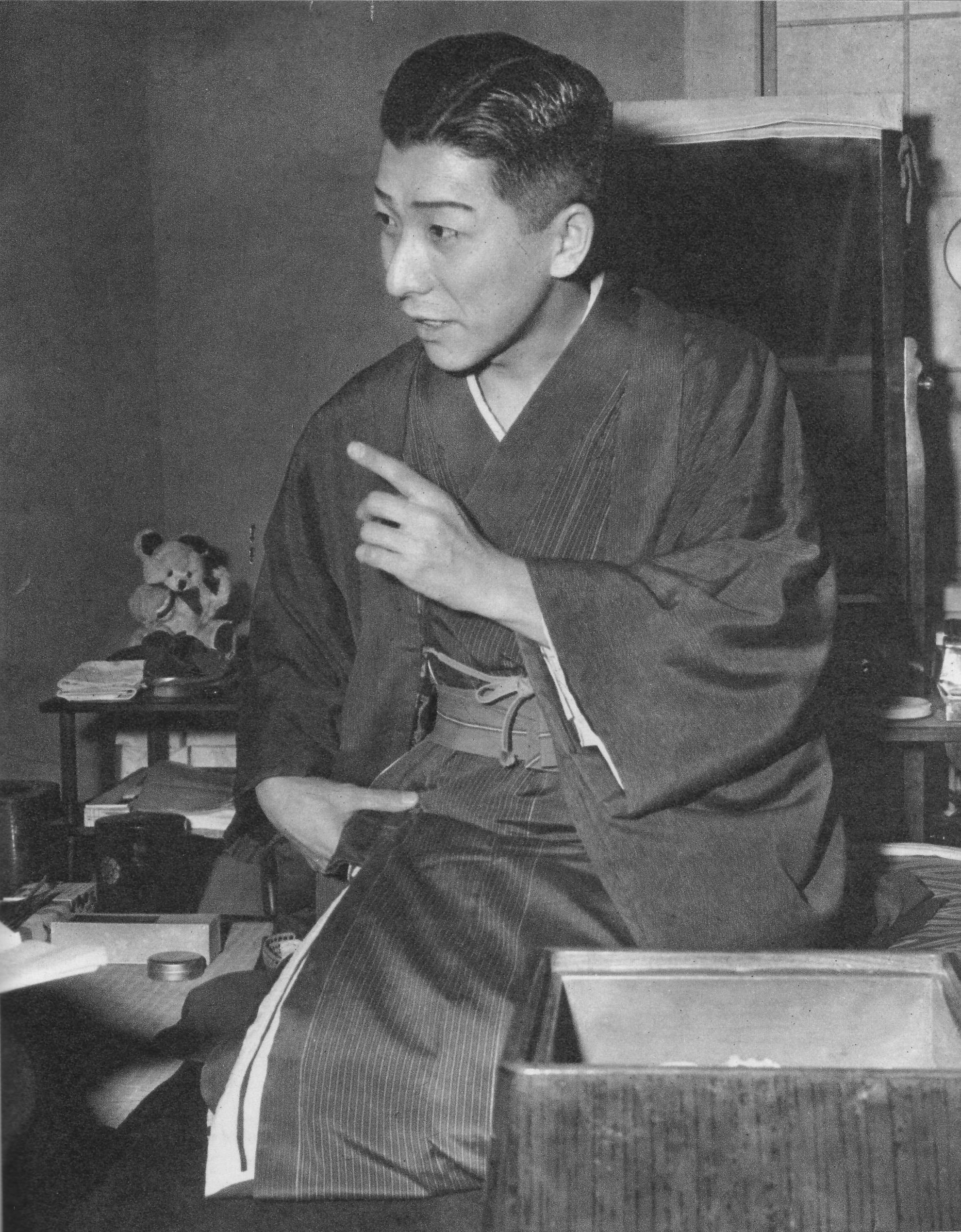
- Nakamura Utaemon in 1951
- Born: Fujio Kawamura; January 20, 1917; Tokyo, Japan
- Died: March 31, 2001 (aged 84)
- Other name: Nakamura Kotaro III Nakamura Fukusuke VI Nakamura Shikan VI
- Years active: 1922–1996
- Known for: Onnagata-roles
- Children: Nakamura Baigyoku IV (adopted son); Nakamura Kaishun II (adopted son)
- Father: Nakamura Utaemon V
- Relatives: Nakamura Fukusuke V (older brother)

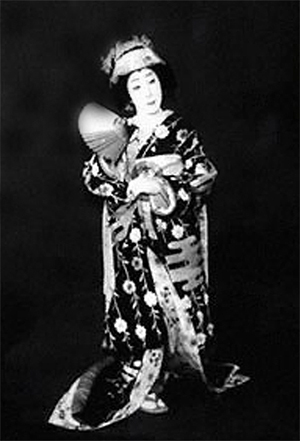
Utaemon VI in costume for the female kabuki role (onnagata) in Musume Dōjōji, 1951

Nakamura Utaemon VI (中村歌右衛門 (6代目); January 20, 1917 – March 31, 2001) was a Japanese kabuki performer and an artistic director of the Kabuki-za in Tokyo. He was a prominent member of a family of kabuki actors from the Keihanshin region.

Nakamura Utaemon was a stage name with significant cultural and historical connotations. The name Utaemon indicates personal status as an actor. Such a title can only be assumed after the death of a previous holder, under restrictive succession conventions.

He was considered the greatest onnagata of the post-War period, and was heralded as a "a divine messenger given to kabuki from heaven" during his naming ceremony.

== Life and career ==
Utaemon VI was the son of Nakamura Utaemon V. The actor's name was Fujio Kawamura when he was born in the sixth generation of a line of famous Kabuki actors. In the conservative Kabuki world, stage names are passed from father to son in a formal system which converts the kabuki stage name into a mark of accomplishment. The name Utaemon VI was formally proclaimed in a 1951 ceremony at the Kabuki theater in Tokyo.

Lineage of Utaemon stage names

- Nakamura Utaemon I (1714–1791)
- Nakamura Utaemon II (1752–1798)
- Nakamura Utaemon III (1778–1838)
- Nakamura Utaemon IV (1798–1852)
- Nakamura Utaemon V (1865–1940)
- Nakamura Utaemon VI (1917–2001)

In a long career, he acted in many kabuki plays; but he was best known for his oyama roles.

His two adopted sons, Nakamura Baigyoku IV (四代目 中村梅玉) (Note: Real Name: Toshiyuki Kawamura (Japanese: 河村順之, Hepburn: Kawamura Toshiyuki; b. 2 August 1946 in Kanagawa Prefecture, Japan).) and Nakamura Kaishun II (二代目 中村魁春) (Note: Real Name: Toyohide Hirano (Japanese: 平野豊栄, Hepburn: Hirano Toyohide; b. 1 January 1948 in Kanagawa Prefecture, Japan).) are also Kabuki actors (just like his father, Utaemon VI's eldest son, Nakamura Baigyoku IV is currently a Living National Treasure (Note: Baigyoku IV was designated a Living National Treasure in 2022 and is currently one of six Kabuki actors who are Living National Treasures (the other five actors are: Bandō Tamasaburō V (which is also currently the only one of the six current Living National Treasures that is an onnagata), Kataoka Nizaemon XV, Nakamura Karoku V, Nakamura Tōzō VI and Onoe Kikugorō VII.)).

== Living National Treasure ==
In 1968, the government of Japan designated him a Living National Treasure, which was a title acknowledging him as a "bearer of important intangible cultural assets." He was the youngest person in history to be recognised a such.

== Selected works ==
In a statistical overview derived from writings by and about Nakamura Utaemon VI, OCLC/WorldCat encompasses roughly 6 works in 6 publications in 2 languages and 9 library holdings

- 2006 – Meiboku sendai hagi: sanmaku goba (伽羅先代萩: 三幕五場) ISBN 9784835615981; OCLC 70233503
- 1993 – Kagamiyama kokyō no nishikie: tōshi kyōgen yonmaku rokuba (鏡山旧錦絵: 通し狂言四幕六場) OCLC 054923943
- 1989 – Banchō sarayashiki: hitomaku niba (番町皿屋敷: 一幕二場) OCLC 029849646
- 1984 – Daikyōji mukashigoyomi: osan mohee nimaku sanba (大経師昔暦: おさん茂兵衛二幕三場) OCLC 054925804

== Honors ==
- Japan Art Academy, 1963
- Order of Culture, 1979
- Praemium Imperiale, 1995
- Grand Cordon of the Order of the Sacred Treasure, 1996

== See also ==
- List of people on stamps of Japan
- Shūmei

== Bibliography ==
- Brandon, James R. "Myth and Reality: A Story of Kabuki during American Censorship, 1945-1949," Asian Theatre Journal, Volume 23, Number 1, Spring 2006, pp. 1–110.
- Leiter, Samuel L. (2006). Historical Dictionary of Japanese Traditional Theatre. Lanham, Maryland: Scarecrow Press. ISBN 978-0-8108-5527-4; OCLC 238637010
- __________. ( 2002). A Kabuki Reader: History and Performance. ISBN 9780765607041; ISBN 9780765607058; OCLC 182632867
- Nussbaum, Louis Frédéric and Käthe Roth. (2005). Japan Encyclopedia. Cambridge: Harvard University Press. ISBN 978-0-674-01753-5; OCLC 48943301
- Scott, Adolphe Clarence. (1955). The Kabuki Theatre of Japan. London: Allen & Unwin. OCLC 622644114
- Takeshi Kaneko. "A Man with the Brilliance of a Flower; Nakamura Utaemon VI," Yomiuri Shimbun. Spring 2009.
