= Kataoka Nizaemon XII =

Japanese kabuki actor

- 十二代目片岡仁左衛門
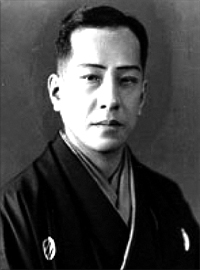
- Born: Tōkichi Kataoka; 9 September 1882; Asakusa, Tokyo, Japan
- Died: 16 March 1946 (aged 63); Shibuya, Tokyo, Japan
- Other names: Kataoka Rosen IV, Kataoka Tsuchinosuke II, Kataoka Gadō IV, Matsushimaya, Kataoka Tōkichi, Jinzaemon
- Children: Kataoka Gadō V (eldest son); Ichimura Yoshigorō II (middle son); Kataoka Roen VI (youngest son)
- Father: Kataoka Nizaemon X
- Relatives: Kataoka Nizaemon VIII (grandfather)

Kataoka Nizaemon XII (十二代目片岡仁左衛門, Jūnidaime Kataoka Nizaemon; 9 September 1882 – 16 March 1946) was a Japanese kabuki actor of the Kamigata tradition; also known as Jinzaemon. His violent death at the hands of a starving writer living on the actor's property has been cited by scholars such as John Dower as an example of the chaos and "social disintegration" in the months and years immediately following Japan's defeat in World War II.

== Names and lineage ==
Like most kabuki actors, Nizaemon had a number of stage names over the course of his career. He debuted onstage under his birth name, Tōkichi Kataoka, and later took on the names Kataoka Tsuchinosuke II and Kataoka Gadō IV before becoming the twelfth in the line of Kataoka Nizaemon. He was the fourth actor to be known by the poetry name (haimyō) Roen, and bore the guild name (yagō) of Matsushimaya.

Born into a renowned Tokyo Kabuki family, Nizaemon XII's great-grandfather, Nakamura Karoku I (初代 中村歌六) was a legendary onnagata actor from the Kamigata region (present-day Kansai region) who was well-connected to several important kabuki theater families, such as the Hamuraya house (aka Arashi family) and the Takashimaya house (aka Ichikawa-Suwara family).

Nizaemon XII was one of two grandsons of Kataoka Nizaemon VIII (八代目 片岡仁左衛門), an outstanding tachiyaku actor who specialized in nimaime (handsome and refined young lovers), jitsugotoshi (wise, righteous and clever men), katakiyaku (villains) and oyajigata (old men) roles.

Nizaemon XII's father, Kataoka Nizaemon X (十代目 片岡仁左衛門) was a renowned tachiyaku like his father (Nizaemon VIII) whose specialty was katakiyaku (i.e. villain) roles.

His uncle (and Nizaemon X's younger brother), Kataoka Nizaemon XI (十一代目 片岡仁左衛門) was a renowned and outstanding kabuki actor known for being the most notorious Kaneru yakusha (i.e., an actor who plays both Tachiyaku and onnagata roles) in the history of the Matsushimaya acting house.

Nizaemon XII's cousin, Kataoka Nizaemon XIII (十三代目 片岡仁左衛門) was one of the greatest and most outstanding tachiyaku actors of the Showa era, whose specialty was wagoto roles (which earned him the prestigious title of Living National Treasure (or Ningen Kokuhō in Japanese) in March 1972).

Like Nizaemon XII, his three sons were also kabuki actors: his eldest son, Kataoka Gadō XIII (十三代目 片岡我童) was an accomplished and skilled onnagata actor (who would later be known posthumously as Kataoka Nizaemon XIV/十四代目 片岡仁左衛門), Ichimura Yoshigorō II (二代目 市村吉五郎) was a tachiyaku actor who was known for being a supporting actor (and who, unlike the rest of the family, was a member of the Tachibanaya house and not the Matsushimaya house), and Kataoka Roen VI (六代目 片岡芦燕) was a veteran tachiyaku actor whose specialty was katakiyaku (i.e., villain) roles.

His nephew (Yoshigorō II's son), Ichimura Kakitsu XVII (十七代目 市村家橘) is a veteran tachiyaku actor who is a member of the Tachibanaya house (as is his father) and who plays both aragoto and wagoto roles.

== Life and career ==
Born into a kabuki family, the actor who would later be known as Nizaemon first took the stage in 1885, at the age of three, at the Chitose-za, under his birth name, Tōkichi Kataoka. His father, Kataoka Nizaemon X, died in 1895; young Tōkichi took on the name Tsuchinosuke the following year, becoming Kataoka Gadō IV several years later in 1901.

He frequently performed alongside Matsumoto Kōshirō VII and Ichimura Uzaemon XV, among others, and took part in many premiere and revival performances. He is said to have had a somewhat cold and gloomy acting style earlier in his career, when he frequently played alongside onnagata Onoe Baikō VI, though after Baikō's death, when Nizaemon came to more frequently act alongside Uzaemon XV, his style and apparent mood onstage brightened noticeably; this cold, gloomy personality would return, and served him well, however, as it suited perfectly the mood of certain sewamono roles and plays. Gadō played a young Minamoto no Yoshitsune (known as Ushiwakamaru in the play) in the 1912 debut of the dance drama Hashi Benkei, and would play Yoshitsune again on many occasions in Kanjinchō.

He took the name Nizaemon in a shūmei (name succession) ceremony in January 1936. He came to specialize in onnagata roles, i.e. female roles, and those of refined, graceful noblemen such as Yoshitsune is often portrayed. He played the courtesan Agemaki, the chief female role in Sukeroku Yukari no Edo Zakura in a March 1938 performance at the Osaka Kabuki-za.

His life and career were cut short, however, when, on 16 March 1946, he and four others in his household were murdered by Toshiaki Iida, in the actor's home. Iida was a writer who had been living in a detached house on the actor's property. Like the great majority of Japanese in the early post-war, Iida was extremely poor and starving. On this particular day, a quarrel erupted between Nizaemon and Iida who envied and resented the actor's relatively lavish lifestyle; it ended with the writer killing Nizaemon, his wife, his infant son, and two maids (included his sister) with a hatchet.

Iida was arrested in Miyagi Prefecture on 30 March. Feeble-mindedness was accepted in the trial and he was sentenced to life imprisonment on 22 October 1947. He was paroled in the 1960s.
