= Utagawa Yoshitaki =

Japanese ukiyo-e artist and printmaker (1841–1899)

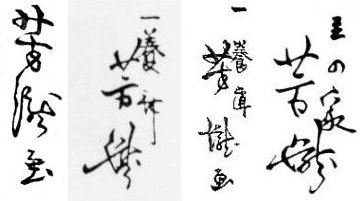
Signatures of Utagawa Yoshitaki reading from left to right: •“Yoshitaki ga” (芳滝 画) •“Ichiyōsai Yoshitaki” (一養斎 芳滝) •“Ichiyōtei Yoshitaki ga” (一養亭 芳滝 画) •“Satonoya Yoshitaki” (里の家 芳滝)

Utagawa Yoshitaki (歌川 芳滝; April 13, 1841 – June 28, 1899), who is also known as Ichiyōsai Yoshitaki (一養斎 芳滝), was a Japanese designer of ukiyo-e woodblock prints who was active in both Edo (Tokyo) and Osaka. He was also a painter and newspaper illustrator. His father was a paste merchant, and Yoshitaki became a student of Utagawa Yoshiume (1819–1879). Yoshitaki was the most prolific designer of woodblock prints in Osaka from the 1860s to the 1880s, producing more than 1,200 different prints, almost all of kabuki actors.

== Biography ==
Yoshitaki, born Nakai Tsunejirō, was the eldest son of a noodle-paste merchant and lived in Minami Hommachi, in the Unagidani area of Osaka. He studied with Yoshiume from the age of twelve to fifteen, publishing his first prints while still in his early teens. In 1855 he left his teacher's studio to work independently; his earliest surviving work dates from 1854 and was created jointly with Hirosada, one of the two leading chūban-format print designers active in Osaka during the 1860s and 1870s, whose work strongly influenced Yoshitaki's own. By the early 1860s, still in his twenties, Yoshitaki had already become a sought-after designer.

From 1875, signing his work variously as Sasaki Yoshitaki and Nakai Yoshitaki, he produced nishiki-e shinbun (illustrated newspaper prints) for several Osaka publications, including the Osaka nishikiga shinbun, the Osaka nishikie shinwa, the Kanzen chōaku nishikiga shinbun, and the Shinbun zue. He also continued to work as a painter, exhibiting both in Japan and internationally, winning bronze medals at the first two Naikoku Kaiga Kyōshinkai exhibitions in 1882 and 1884, and receiving an honourable mention at the fourth Naikoku Kangyō Hakurankai, a national industrial exposition. Like many ukiyo-e artists of his generation, he also worked as a commercial artist, producing banzuke (theatre programmes) and advertising illustrations for a sake company. He later moved to Kyoto in 1880 and to Sakai in 1885, where he was buried at Nanshūji, on Ryūkōzan.

== Gallery ==
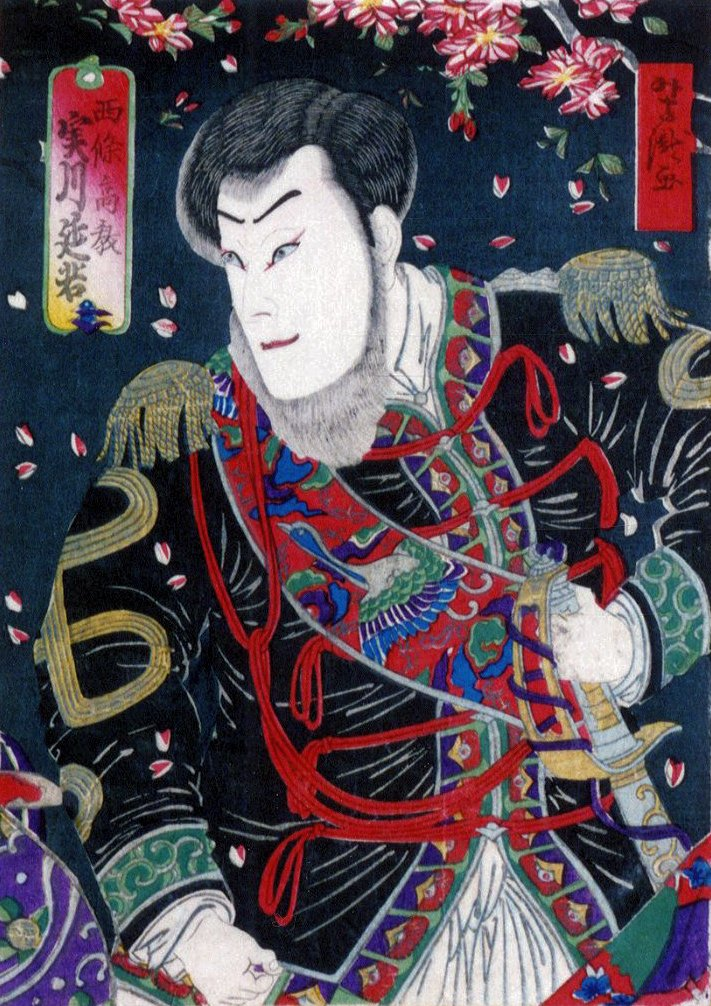
Woodblock print by Utagawa Yoshitaki of kabuki actor Enjaku Jitsukawa I as Saijō Takanori in the March 1873 Osaka Ebisu-za production of Seinan Yume Monogatari

== Further readings ==
- Lane, Richard, Images from the Floating World, The Japanese Print, New York, Putnam, 1978, 349.
- Newland, Amy Reigle. (2005). Hotei Encyclopedia of Japanese Woodblock Prints. Amsterdam: Hotei. ISBN 9789074822657; OCLC 61666175
- Roberts, Laurance P. (1976). A Dictionary of Japanese Artists. New York: Weatherhill. ISBN 9780834801134; OCLC 2005932
