= Kabuki shinpō =

Japanese theatre magazine (1879–1897)

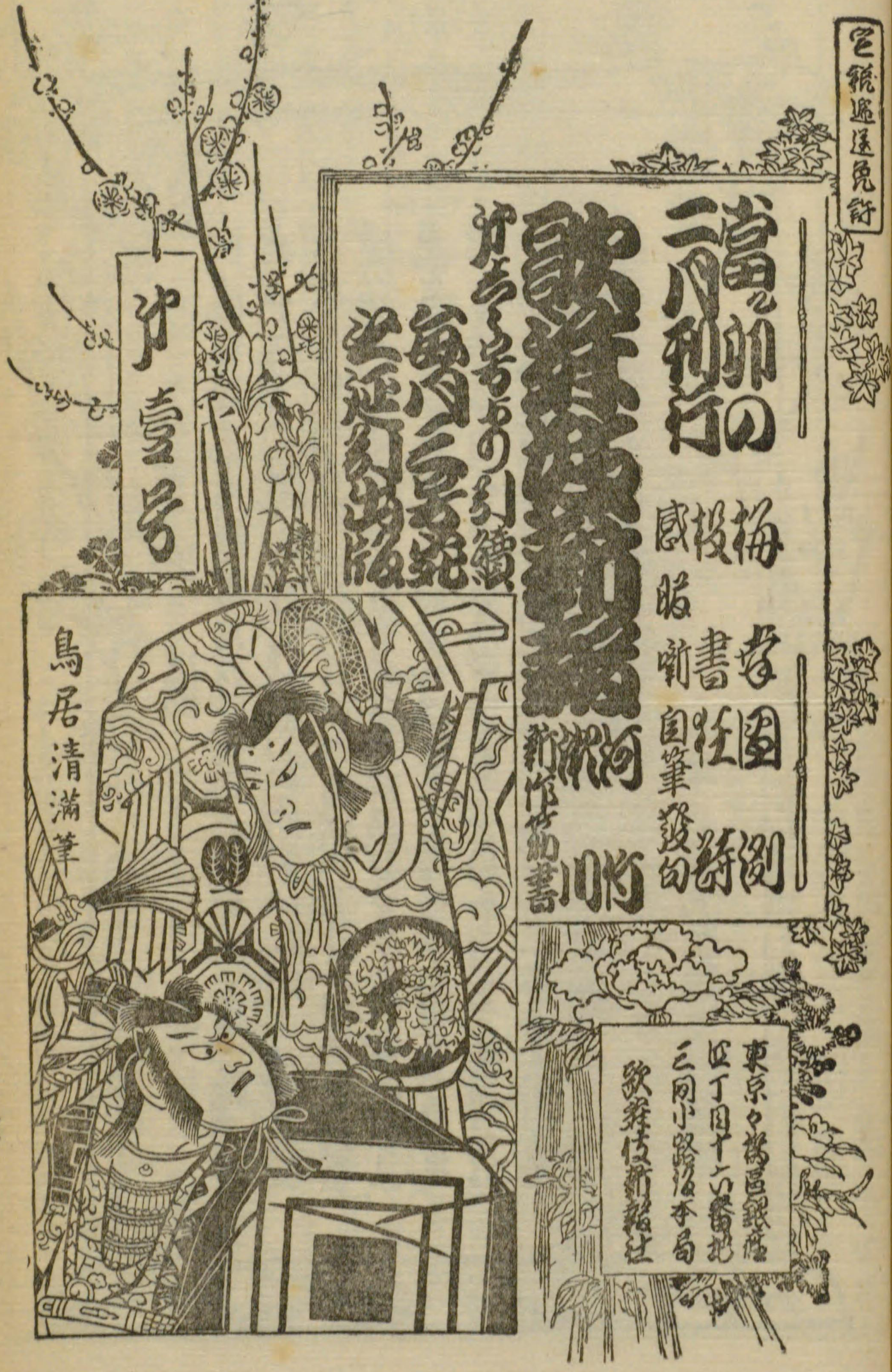
Cover of the first issue, 1879

Kabuki shinpō (歌舞伎新報, "Kabuki news") was a Japanese magazine which provided news on the world of kabuki, a popular Japanese performing art, during the Meiji period (1867–1911). The magazine was in circulation between 1879 and 1897. The publisher, Kabuki shinpō sha, was based in Tokyo.

== History and cultural significance ==
During its publication period, Kabuki shinpō was a popular publication for laymen to enjoy kabuki without attending the costly, time-consuming performances. The contents of the magazine included everything from "scripts and plots, updates of actors, critiques of performances" to "articles like chronicles, and theatrical paragraphs."

Kabuki shinpō was published by Genrokukan Studios in Tokyo. Also, the primary funding source for the magazine, Genrokukan Studios was a photography studio created by famous "millionaire photographer" Seibei Kajima.
