= Kataoka Nizaemon =

Kataoka Nizaemon (片岡 仁左衛門) is a stage name used by Kabuki actors, beginning with Fujikawa Isaburo (younger brother of the actor Toyoshima Harunojo), who adopted the name.

== Lineage ==
- Kataoka Nizaemon I (1656-1715): student of Yamashita Hanzaemon.
- Kataoka Nizaemon II: son of Kataoka Nizaemon I. Initially performed as Kataoka Chōtayū I.
- Kataoka Nizaemon III: husband of Kataoka Nizaemon I's sister. Student of Fujikawa Buzaemon I.
- Kataoka Nizaemon IV (-1758): adopted son of Kataoka Nizaemon III. Previously performed as a representative of the Fujikawa lineage.
- Kataoka Nizaemon V: adopted son of Kataoka Nizaemon IV. Also performed as Fujikawa Hanzaburō III.
- Kataoka Nizaemon VI (1731-1789): relation to his predecessors unknown.
- Kataoka Nizaemon VII (1755-1837): younger brother of Asao Kunigorō I. A student firstly of Nakamura Jūzō II, then of Asao Tamejūrō I.
- Kataoka Nizaemon VIII (1810-1863): adopted son of Kataoka Nizaemon VII. Firstly the adopted son and student of Ichikawa Danjūrō VII; this adoption was dissolved. He then became the student of Arashi Rikan II. Performed as Kataoka Gadō I before becoming Kataoka Nizaemon VIII.
- Kataoka Nizaemon IX (1839-1872): adopted son of Kataoka Nizaemon VIII; initially student of Mimasu Daigorō IV, then student of Kataoka Gadō II.
- Kataoka Nizaemon X (1851-1895): third son of Kataoka Nizaemon VIII (Real Name: Tsuchinosuke Kataoka).
- Kataoka Nizaemon XI (1858-1934): fourth son of Kataoka Nizaemon VIII (Real Name: Hidetarō Kataoka).
- Kataoka Nizaemon XII (1882-1946): grandson of Kataoka Nizaemon VIII through a daughter, and adopted son of Kataoka Nizaemon X; performed also as Kataoka Tsuchinosuke II and Kataoka Gadou IV (Real Name: Tōkichi Kataoka).
- Kataoka Nizaemon XIII (1903-1994): officially recorded as the eldest son, but actually the adopted son of Kataoka Nizaemon XI. His true father was Yasuda Zenzaburō, of the Yasuda zaibatsu (Real Name: Chiyonosuke Kataoka).
- Kataoka Nizaemon XIV (1910-1993): eldest son of Kataoka Nizaemon XII (Real Name: Hajime Kataoka).
- Kataoka Nizaemon XV (1944-): third son of Kataoka Nizaemon XIII (Real Name: Takao Kataoka).
