= List of painters by name beginning with "N" =

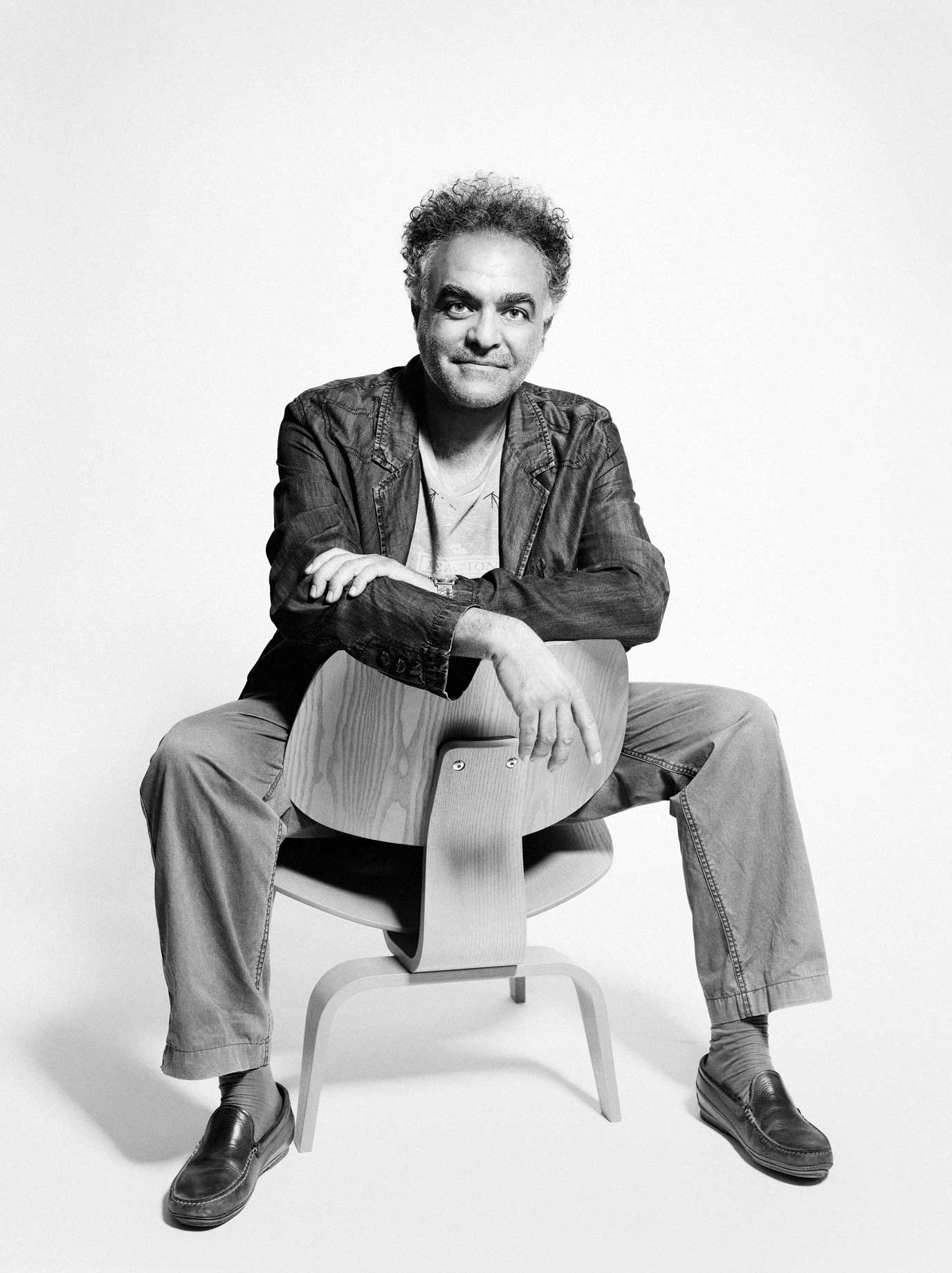
Nadim Karam of Lebanon

Please add the names of notable painters with a Wikipedia page, in precise English alphabetical order, using U.S. spelling conventions. Country and regional names refer to where painters worked for long periods, not to personal allegiances.

- Nadim Karam (born 1957), Lebanese artist
- Isabel Naftel (1832–1912), English artist
- Maud Naftel (1856–1890), English painter
- Paul Jacob Naftel (1817–1891), Guernsey/English painter and teacher
- Urakusai Nagahide (有楽斎長秀, fl. 1804 – c. 1848), Japanese ukiyo-e woodblock printer
- Nagasawa Rosetsu (長沢芦雪, 1754–1799), Japanese painter
- Aaron Nagel, (born 1980), American artist
- Patrick Nagel, (1945–1984), American artist and illustrator
- István Nagy (1873–1937), Hungarian painter
- Matthijs Naiveu, (1647–1721), Dutch painter
- Naka Bokunen (名嘉睦稔, born 1953), Japanese (Okinawa) print-maker
- Nakahara Nantenbō (中原南天棒, 1839–1925), artist and Zen master
- Naondo Nakamura (中村 直人, 1905–1981), Japanese painter and sculptor
- Tadashi Nakayama (1927–2014), Japanese woodblock printer
- Nam Gye-u (남계우, 1811–1888), Korean painter and official
- Carlos Trillo Name (born 1941), Cuban painter
- Albert Namatjira (1902–1959), Australian aboriginal painter
- Lisa Nankivil (born 1958), American painter and print-maker
- Nara Yoshitomo (奈良美智, born 1959), Japanese artist
- Oscar Rodríguez Naranjo (1907–2006), Colombian painter and sculptor
- Jørgen Nash (1920–2004), Danish artist and writer
- Paul Nash (1889–1946), English painter and war artist
- Alexander Nasmyth (1758–1840), Scottish painter
- Anne Nasmyth (1798–1874), Scottish/English painter and teacher
- Barbara Nasmyth (1790–1870), Scottish/English painter and educator
- Charlotte Nasmyth (1804–1884), Scottish/English painter
- Jane Nasmyth (1788–1867), Scottish painter
- Patrick Nasmyth (1787–1831), Scottish painter
- Jean-Marc Nattier (1685–1766), French painter
- Bruce Nauman (born 1941), American artist
- Josef Navrátil (1798–1865), Austro-Hungarian (Bohemian) mural and fresco painter
- Naza (born 1955), Brazilian/America painter
- Radi Nedelchev (1938–2022), Bulgarian artist especially of landscapes, village life, and festivals
- Alice Neel (1900–1984), American painter
- Aert van der Neer (1603–1677), Dutch painter
- Eglon van der Neer (1633–1703), Dutch painter
- Almada Negreiros (1893–1970), Portuguese painter, poet and writer
- LeRoy Neiman (1927–2012), American painter
- Kristin Nelson (1945–2018), American painter, actor and author
- Albert Nemethy (1920–1998), Hungarian-American painter
- Odd Nerdrum (born 1944), Norwegian figurative painter
- Ismael Nery (1900–1934), Brazilian painter, poet and architect
- Ugo Nespolo (born 1941), Italian artist
- Mikhail Nesterov (1862–1942), Russian artist
- Caspar Netscher (1639–1684), Dutch painter
- Louise Nevelson (1900–1988), American artist
- NEVERCREW (born 1980 and 1979), Swiss duo of urban artists
- Jessie Newbery (1864–1948), Scottish artist and embroiderer
- Barnett Newman (1905–1970), American artist
- Roy Newell (1914–2006), American painter
- Ni Duan (倪端, 1436–1505), Chinese imperial painter
- Ni Tian (倪田, 1855–1919), Chinese painter
- Ni Yuanlu (倪元璐, 1593–1644) Chinese calligrapher, painter and official
- Ni Zan (倪瓚, 1301–1374), Chinese painter
- Ben Nicholson (1894–1982), English abstract painter
- William Nicholson (1872–1949), English painter
- John Nicolson (1891–1951), Scottish/English painter, etcher and illustrator
- Nicomachus of Thebes (4th century BCE), Ancient Greek painter
- Caro Niederer (born 1963), Swiss artist
- Amaldus Nielsen (1838–1932), Norwegian painter
- Ejnar Nielsen (1872–1956), Danish painter and illustrator
- Jan Nieuwenhuys (1922–1986), Dutch painter
- Nína Tryggvadóttir (1913–1968), Icelandic artist
- Nishida Shun'ei (西田俊英, born 1953), Japanese painter and art professor
- Nishikawa Sukenobu (西川祐信, 1671–1750), Japanese print-maker
- Margaret Graeme Niven (1906–1997), English painter
- Nōami (能阿弥, 1397–1471), Japanese artist and connoisseur
- James Campbell Noble (1845–1913), Scottish painter
- Robert Noble (1857–1917), Scottish artist
- Isamu Noguchi (野口勇, 1904–1988), American artist and landscape architect
- Sidney Nolan (1917–1992), Australia painter and print-maker
- Kenneth Noland (1924–2010), American painter
- Emil Nolde (1867–1956), German painter and print-maker
- Reinier Nooms (1623–1667), Dutch painter and etcher
- Jean-Pierre Norblin de La Gourdaine (1745–1830), French/Polish painter, draftsman and engraver
- Max Magnus Norman (born 1973), Swedish artist, painter and sculptor
- Raymond Normand (1919–2000), French painter
- Vladimir Novak (born 1947), Czechoslovak/Czech painter, graphic artist and illustrator
- Guity Novin (born 1944), Iranian/Canadian painter
- Zbigniew Nowosadzki (born 1957), Polish painter
- Zoltán Nuridsány (1925–1974), Hungarian painter of Armenian origin
- Arvid Nyholm (1866–1927), Swedish/American painter
