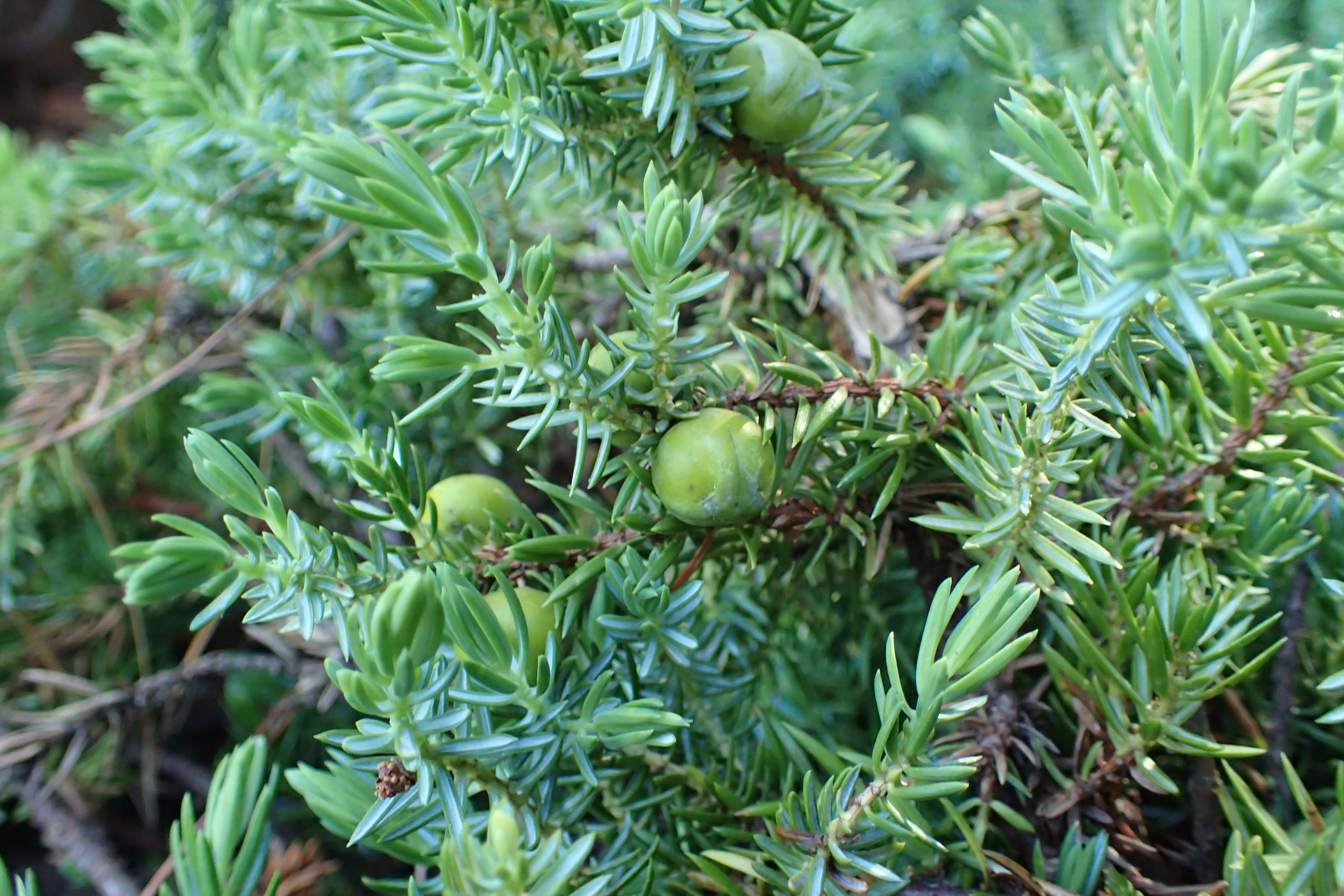

Scientific classification
- Kingdom: Plantae
- Clade: Tracheophytes
- Clade: Gymnospermae
- Division: Pinophyta
- Class: Pinopsida
- Order: Cupressales
- Family: Cupressaceae
- Genus: Juniperus
- Section: Juniperus sect. Juniperus
- Species: J. lutchuensis

Binomial name
- Juniperus lutchuensis Koidz.

Synonyms
- Juniperus taxifolia var. lutchuensis (Koidz.) Satake

= Juniperus lutchuensis =

Species of conifer

Juniperus lutchuensis or Ryūkyū juniper (オキナワハイネズ, Okinawa-hainezu) (syn. Juniperus taxifolia var. lutchuensis (Koidz.) Satake) is a species of juniper native to the Ryūkyū Islands, Izu Islands, Izu Peninsula, and Bōsō Peninsula, Japan.

== Taxonomy ==
Juniperus lutchuensis was first described by Gen'ichi Koidzumi in 1918, with Okinawa Island the type locality. In 1962, Satake Yoshisuke treated it as a variety of Juniperus taxifolia. Some authors treat it as a synonym of Juniperus taxifolia from the Bonin Islands, while others treat it as a variety of it, Juniperus taxifolia var. lutchuensis. It is probably best considered a separate species as it has a distinct DNA profile clearly different from J. taxifolia.

== Description ==
Juniperus lutchuensis is an evergreen coniferous shrub growing to a height of 1–3 metres (3 1/2–10 ft). Its many branches may spread some 2–4 metres (6 1/2–13 ft). The leaves are needle-like, in whorls of three, light green, 7–14 millimetres (1/4–1/2 in) long and 1–1.5 mm broad, with a double white stomatal band (split by a green midrib) on the inner surface. It is dioecious, with separate male and female plants.

The seed cones are berry-like, green ripening in 18 months to purple-brown; they are spherical, 8–9 mm diameter, and have three or six fused scales in one or two whorls of three; the three larger scales each bear a single seed. The seeds are dispersed when birds eat the cones, digesting the fleshy scales and passing the hard seeds in their droppings. The pollen cones are yellow, 5 mm long.

== Distribution and habitat ==
Endemic to Japan, it may be found growing in coastal areas, on cliffs and in sunny spots, on the Izu Peninsula and Bōsō Peninsula of Honshū, the Izu Islands, Tanegashima (Ōsumi Islands), Tokara Islands, Amami Ōshima and Tokunoshima (Amami Islands), and, within Okinawa Prefecture, on Okinawa Island and Yagaji Island, Iheya Island, Izena Island, and Aka Island, Tokashiki Island, and Zamami Island (Kerama Islands).

== Conservation ==
Much of its habitat has been lost due to coastal development and revetments, and it has also often been taken from the wild for use in gardens and bonsai. Its conservation status is uncertain, but it is rare and may become threatened. In the 2018 Okinawa Red Data Book, Juniperus taxifolia var. lutchuensis is assessed as Endangered.
