= Octavius Oakley =

British artist (1800–1867)

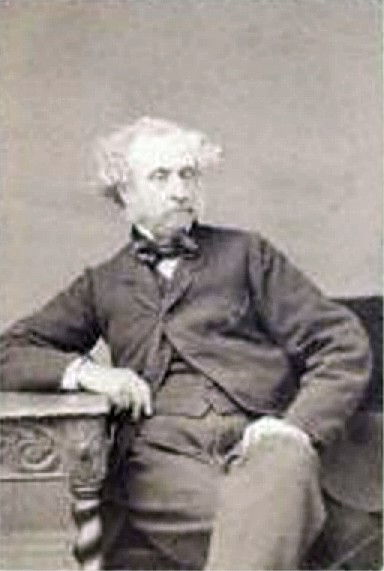
- Octavius Oakley c.1864
- Born: 27 April 1800; Bermondsey, London, England
- Died: 1 March 1867 (aged 66); Kensington, London, England
- Known for: Watercolour
- Children: Isabel Naftel

Octavius Oakley RWS (27 April 1800, in Bermondsey – 1 March 1867, in London), was a British watercolour portrait, figure and landscape artist. He is mainly known for watercolour portraits commissioned by the sitters, often the rich and famous, and genre portraits of gypsy fortune-tellers and similar figures. Both types are typically half or full-length.

== Life ==
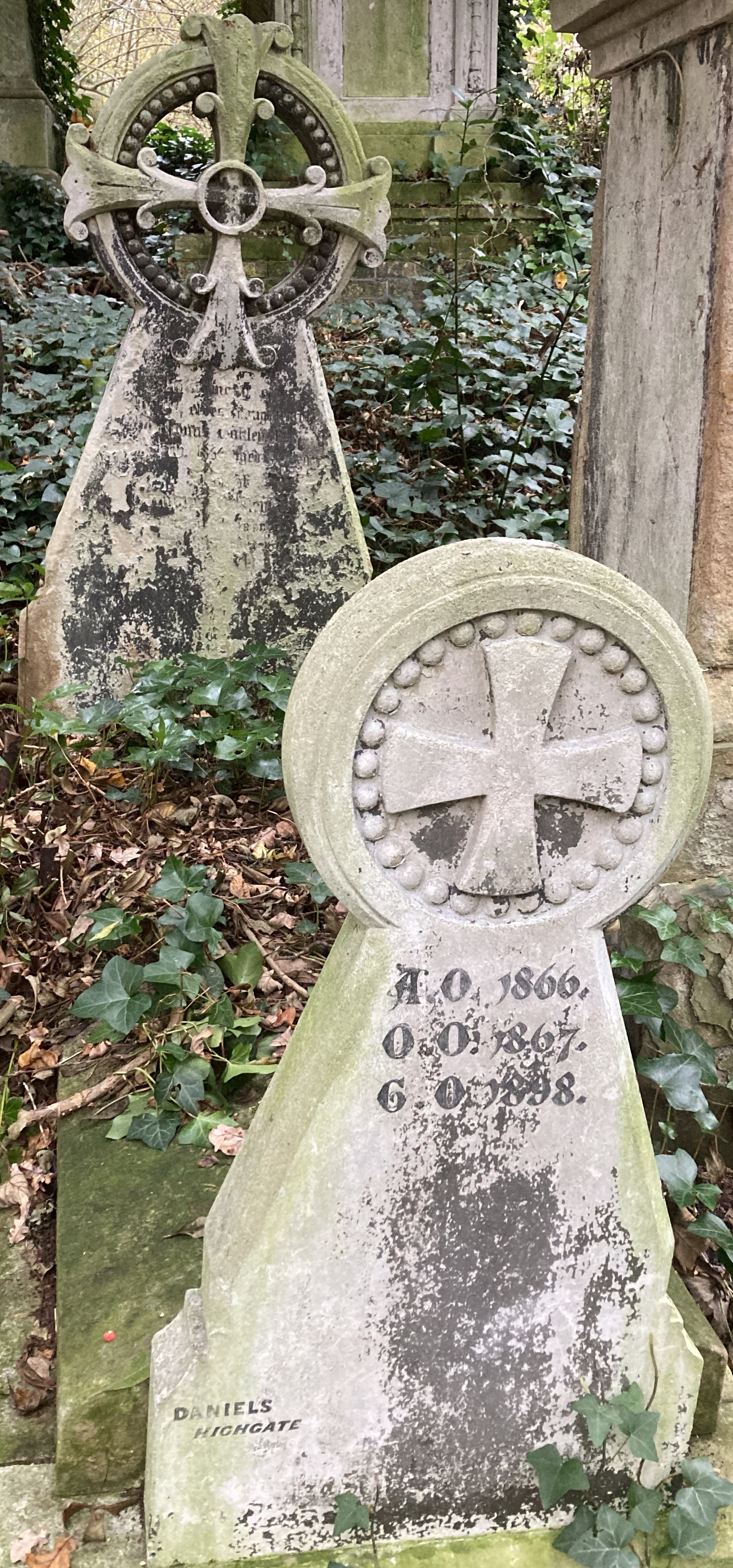
Family grave of Octavius Oakley in Highgate Cemetery

Oakley was born in Bermondsey, London on the 27th April 1800. His family were wealthy from the wool trade until after 1815, when a fall in wool prices caught his father with a large stock. Initially he worked for a Leeds textile company. He developed into a specialist of portraits in watercolour and was given commissions by the Duke of Devonshire.

Whilst living in Derby where he painted rustic scenes until he moved to Leamington Spa in Warwickshire in 1836. He returned to London in the 1840s and worked there until his death, producing paintings of street scenes and gypsies and their lifestyle.

His emphasis on gypsy paintings which he exhibited at the Royal Watercolour Society earned him the name 'Gypsy Oakley'.

Oakley met Thomas Baker in Leamington Spa, where Baker was living and working and in 1841 did a portrait of the celebrated painter, who was an important figure in the Midlands and Birmingham art world. His youngest daughter, Isabel Naftel was also an artist who married the watercolourist Paul Jacob Naftel. Their daughter Maud Naftel was also a notable landscape watercolourist.

He died at his home, 7 Chepstow Villas, Kensington, on the 1st March 1867 and was buried in a family grave (no.14459) on the western side of Highgate Cemetery.

== Gallery ==
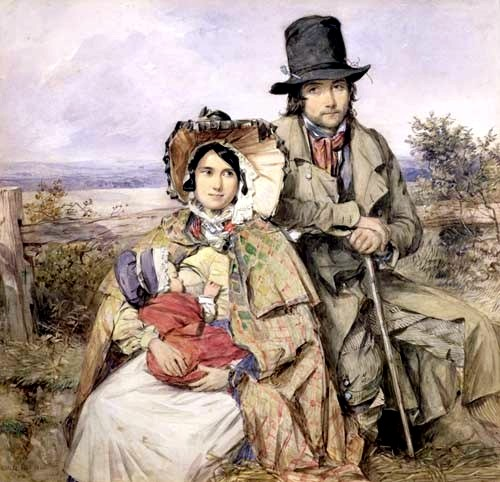
Country Family of Emigrants, watercolour

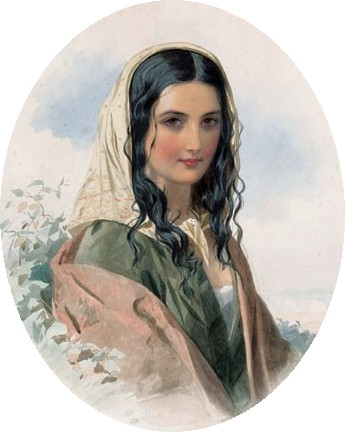
Portrait of a gypsy woman, watercolour on paper, 31 x 25 cm, oval format

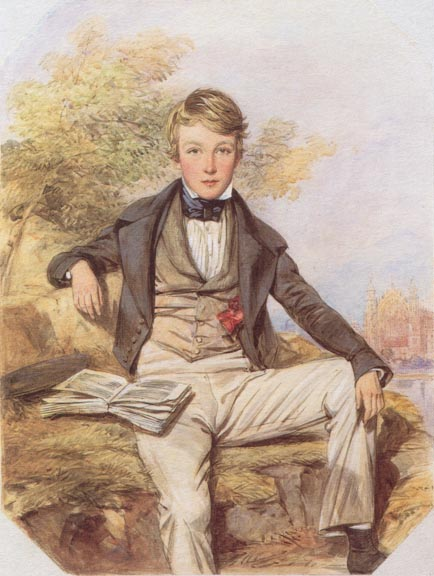
Portrait of Benjamin Gibbons, son of John Gibbons(1777-1851), with a view of Eton College Beyond, Watercolour, 16 1/2 X 11 1/4 inches (36.8 x 28.6 cm)

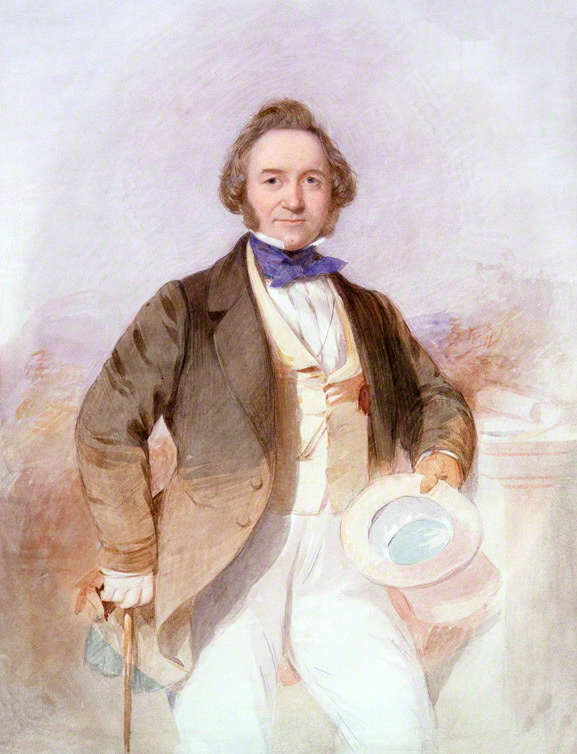
Sir Joseph Paxton, builder of The Crystal Palace

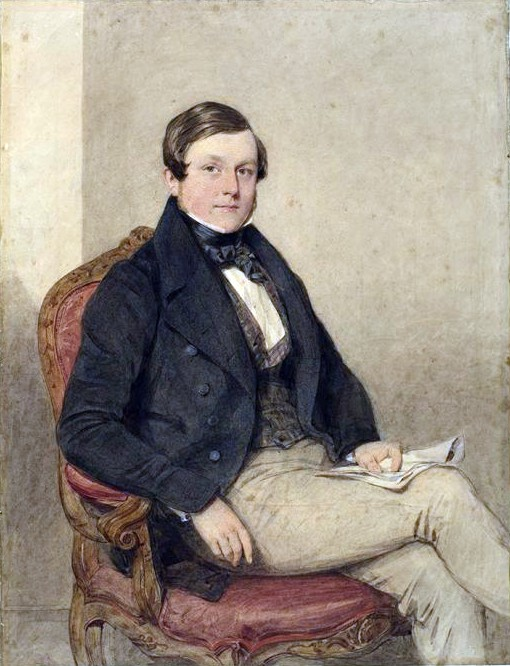
Portrait of Thomas Baker (1809-1864), watercolour, 301 x 232mm
