= Izena, Okinawa =

Izena 伊是名村
- Village
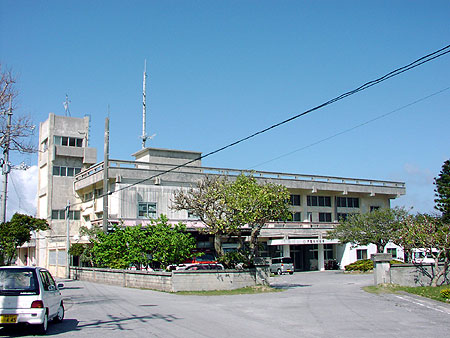
- Izena Village Office

- Flag Emblem

- Location of Izena in Okinawa Prefecture

- Location in Japan
- Coordinates: 26°56′42″N 127°56′28″E
- Country: Japan
- Region: Kyushu (Okinawa)
- Prefecture: Okinawa Prefecture
- District: Shimajiri

Area
  - Total: 15.42 km^{2} (5.95 sq mi)

Population (October 1, 2020)
  - Total: 1,322
  - Density: 85.73/km^{2} (222.0/sq mi)
- Time zone: UTC+09:00 (JST)
- City hall address: 1203 Aza Nakada, Izena-son, Shimajiri-gun, Okinawa-ken; 905-0695
- Climate: Cfa
- Website: vill.izena.okinawa.jp in Japanese
- Symbols
- Flower: Rhododendron simsii
- Tree: Ubamegashi (Quercus Phillyraeoides)

Izena (伊是名村, Izena-son; Okinawan: Ijina, also known as Meejii (前地)) is a village occupying Izena Island in the north of Okinawa Prefecture, Japan (though administered as part of Shimajiri District). There are five localities of about equal size and population located on the island: Izena, Nakada, Shomi, Uchihana, and Jicchaku (also called Serikyaku).

Izena's primary claim to fame is that it was the birthplace of King Shō En, the first king of the Second Shō Dynasty. It is also the birthplace of the contemporary artist Naka Bokunen and musician Shunichi Irei (伊禮 俊一 Irei Shun'ichi).

== Geography ==
As of 1 October 2020, the island has an estimated population of 1,322 and a density of 86 persons per square kilometer. The total area is 15.42 km^{2} (5.95 sq mi).

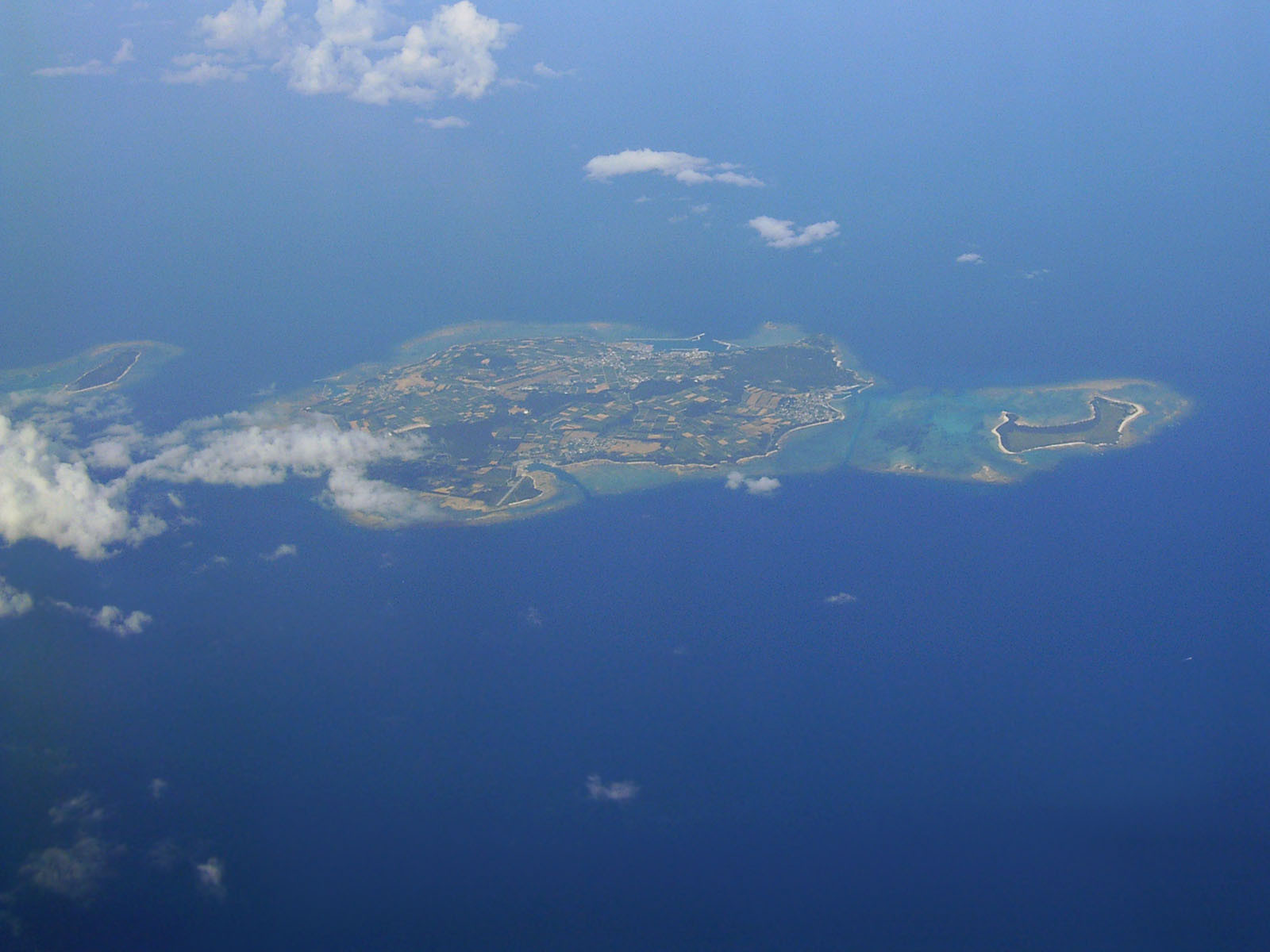
Izena Island

The island's topography features a row of mountains spanning from the northwest to the southeast of the island, with generally flat, arable land covering the remainder. The island has several sandy beaches and designated camping areas with bathroom facilities. The view of Izena's rocky southern coastline is well known as one of Japan's best, with the rock formations 'Umi Gitara' and 'Agi Gitara' dramatically rising from the land and sea.

=== Administrative divisions ===
The village includes five wards.

- Izena (伊是名)
- Nakada (仲田)
- Uchihana (内花)
- Serikyaku (勢理客)
- Shomi (諸見)

== Climate ==
Climate data for Izena (1991−2020 normals, extremes 1977−present)
Month	Jan	Feb	Mar	Apr	May	Jun	Jul	Aug	Sep	Oct	Nov	Dec	Year
Record high °C (°F)	26.3 (79.3)	27.4 (81.3)	27.8 (82.0)	30.0 (86.0)	31.6 (88.9)	35.0 (95.0)	36.0 (96.8)	35.6 (96.1)	34.8 (94.6)	34.1 (93.4)	31.1 (88.0)	29.3 (84.7)	36.0 (96.8)
Mean daily maximum °C (°F)	19.1 (66.4)	19.4 (66.9)	21.2 (70.2)	23.6 (74.5)	26.3 (79.3)	29.2 (84.6)	31.8 (89.2)	31.7 (89.1)	30.5 (86.9)	27.7 (81.9)	24.5 (76.1)	20.9 (69.6)	25.5 (77.9)
Daily mean °C (°F)	16.6 (61.9)	16.7 (62.1)	18.3 (64.9)	20.7 (69.3)	23.4 (74.1)	26.4 (79.5)	28.6 (83.5)	28.6 (83.5)	27.5 (81.5)	25.1 (77.2)	22.0 (71.6)	18.5 (65.3)	22.7 (72.9)
Mean daily minimum °C (°F)	14.3 (57.7)	14.4 (57.9)	15.8 (60.4)	18.2 (64.8)	21.0 (69.8)	24.3 (75.7)	26.3 (79.3)	26.3 (79.3)	25.2 (77.4)	23.1 (73.6)	20.0 (68.0)	16.3 (61.3)	20.4 (68.8)
Record low °C (°F)	5.2 (41.4)	6.6 (43.9)	6.3 (43.3)	10.9 (51.6)	13.9 (57.0)	17.0 (62.6)	20.9 (69.6)	22.0 (71.6)	18.9 (66.0)	16.1 (61.0)	12.4 (54.3)	8.5 (47.3)	5.2 (41.4)
Average precipitation mm (inches)	99.3 (3.91)	108.2 (4.26)	155.6 (6.13)	157.5 (6.20)	222.1 (8.74)	304.5 (11.99)	153.1 (6.03)	159.6 (6.28)	146.1 (5.75)	140.1 (5.52)	111.8 (4.40)	100.3 (3.95)	1,858.4 (73.17)
Average precipitation days (≥ 1.0 mm)	11.6	11.0	12.6	11.5	11.8	11.9	6.6	9.1	9.7	8.9	8.4	10.7	123.8
Mean monthly sunshine hours	89.7	95.9	127.8	142.5	162.3	187.8	277.5	261.0	203.5	181.3	127.9	104.2	1,962.8
Source: JMA

== Economy ==
Izena's main crops are sugar and the edible seaweed mozuku, but there are also several rice paddies, livestock farms, and a cattle breeding facility. From December through April, sugar is harvested and processed at a refinery on the island before being exported. There is an awamori distillery in Izena Village that produces several varieties of the beverage.

Commerce on the island is limited to a small grocery store, gas station, farmer's market, and building supply store that are operated by Japan's Central Union of Agricultural Cooperatives, several other independently owned convenience stores, restaurants, and bars in each of the island's 5 villages, and several hotels along the beach and in the island's center. There is a scuba diving shop in Nakada Village open in the summer that provides equipment and tours.

== History ==
Izena is one of only a handful of places in Okinawa that was not ravaged by American and Japanese military forces during World War II, although American bombing on the nearby island of Iheya resulted in approximately 50 civilian deaths. When American Marines landed on Izena during the night of June 23, 1945, they encountered no hostile defenses or enemy combatants and left shortly thereafter.

== Cultural Properties ==
Izena Village includes many cultural properties.

- Name (Japanese) (Type of registration)

=== Cultural Properties ===
- Copy of “Forestry Ordinance” (植林に対する言上写) (Municipal)
- Copy of “Iheya Island Records” (Iheyajima Kyūki) (伊平屋島旧記写) (Municipal)
- Copy of “Ordinance relating to the Shipwreck Rescue off the coast of Dana” (田名沖における難破船救助に関する言上写) (Municipal)
- Fē-no-futakayata-no-amu’s ritual goods (Tamaki Family) (南の二かや田(玉城家)の拝領品) (Municipal)
- Forest assarting and development documents (山野開墾に関する書類綴) (Municipal)
- Former Nashiro Family Residence and stone walls (旧名城家主屋及び石垣) (National)
- Iheya-no-amu-ganashi's ritual goods (伊平屋の阿母加那志拝領品) (Municipal)
- Izena Tamaudun (伊是名玉御殿) (National) (Prefectural)
- Izena Tamaudun stone zushi bone containers (伊是名玉御殿内石厨子) (Prefectural)
- Mekaru Family heirlooms (銘苅家所蔵品) (Municipal)
- Mekaru Family Residence (銘苅家住宅) (National)
- Nishi-no-futakayata-no-amu's ritual goods (Irei Family) (北の二かや田の阿母(伊禮家)の拝領品) (Municipal)
- Takewa calligraphy (竹割) (Municipal)
- Tōtoku Deities of Serikyaku (土帝君3体) (Municipal)
- Tōtoku Deities of Shomi (土帝君3体) (Municipal)
- Yōhekisan calligraphy (葉壁山) (Municipal)

=== Folk Cultural Properties ===
- Human remains with shell bracelets of Gushikawa Island Site (具志川島遺跡の貝輪着装人骨) (Municipal)
- Kami-Asagi praying site and residence of Nakada (伊是名村仲田の神アサギ附宅地) (Prefectural)
- Kami-Asagi praying site and residence of Serikyaku (伊是名村勢理客の神アサギ附宅地) (Prefectural)
- Kami-Asagi and Uganju praying sites of Izena (伊是名村伊是名の神アサギ附拝所) (Prefectural)
- Kami-Asagi and Uganju praying sites of Shomi (伊是名村諸見の神アサギ附拝所) (Prefectural)

=== Historic Sites ===
- Āgayama beacon (アーガ山の逢火台 (火立所)) (Municipal)
- Agigitara Shell Mound (アギギタラ貝塚) (Municipal)
- Churainjo loom location (美織所) (Municipal)
- Isena Harbour (伊瀬名湊) (Municipal)
- Izena Castle Site (伊是名城跡) (Prefectural)
- Izena Shell Mound (伊是名貝塚) (Municipal)
- Kaimiji-bushi song location (通水節発祥の地) (Municipal)
- Mihoso-dokoro, birthplace of King Shō En (尚円王生誕地屋敷内「みほそ所」) (Prefectural)
- Motojima Site (元島遺跡) (Municipal)
- Nakada Shell Mound (仲田貝塚) (Municipal)
- Nobility Road (サムレー道) (Municipal)
- Oyahata Shell Mound (親畑貝塚) (Municipal)
- Sakata Area (逆田) (Municipal)
- Serikyaku Shell Mound (勢理客貝塚) (Municipal)
- Shiidachi Site (シーダチ遺跡) (Municipal)
- Sunja-gā spring (潮平井) (Municipal)
- Uchihana Shell Mound (内花貝塚) (Municipal)
- Ufujika Shell Mound (ウフジカ貝塚) (Municipal)

=== Places of scenic beauty ===
- Āgayama beacon (アーガ山の逢火台 (火立所)) (Municipal)
- Churainjo loom location (美織所) (Municipal)
- Nobility Road (サムレー道) (Municipal)
- Sunja-gā spring (潮平井) (Municipal)

=== Natural Monuments ===
- Akara-utaki ubame oak and Okinawa pine plant community (アカラ御嶽のウバメガシ及びリュウキュウマツ等の植物群落) (Prefectural)
- Izena Castle Site Selaginella tamariscina community (伊是名城跡のイワヒバ群落) (Prefectural)
- Izena thatching grass (Eriachne armitti F. Muell.) (イゼナガヤ) (Municipal)

== Transportation ==
The island is accessible by a ferry that makes two daily round trips between Nakada Port and Unten Port in Nakijin Village, which is located North of Nago on Okinawa's main island. The ferry trip takes approximately one hour. Izena also has an airfield, though daily service to the island by airplane was halted in 2007.

== Education ==
There are a kindergarten, junior high school and elementary school, all located near the center of the island and serving all five villages. As of 2010, the average size of each grade is 20 students.

Okinawa Prefectural Board of Education operates senior high schools elsewhere in the prefecture.

After graduating from junior high school, students must move to mainland Okinawa if they wish to attend high school. In the sense that they no longer live together, the island's youth become independent from their parents at 15 years old.

== Events ==
Izena Island hosts an annual triathlon, the Izena 88 (2 km swim + 66 km bike + 20 km run) in the Autumn, participation of which (in 2007) was numbered at around 830. There is also a kids' triathlon for island residents on the day preceding the main race.
