= Izena Island =

Island within the Okinawa Islands of Japan

Native name: イジナ / Ijina
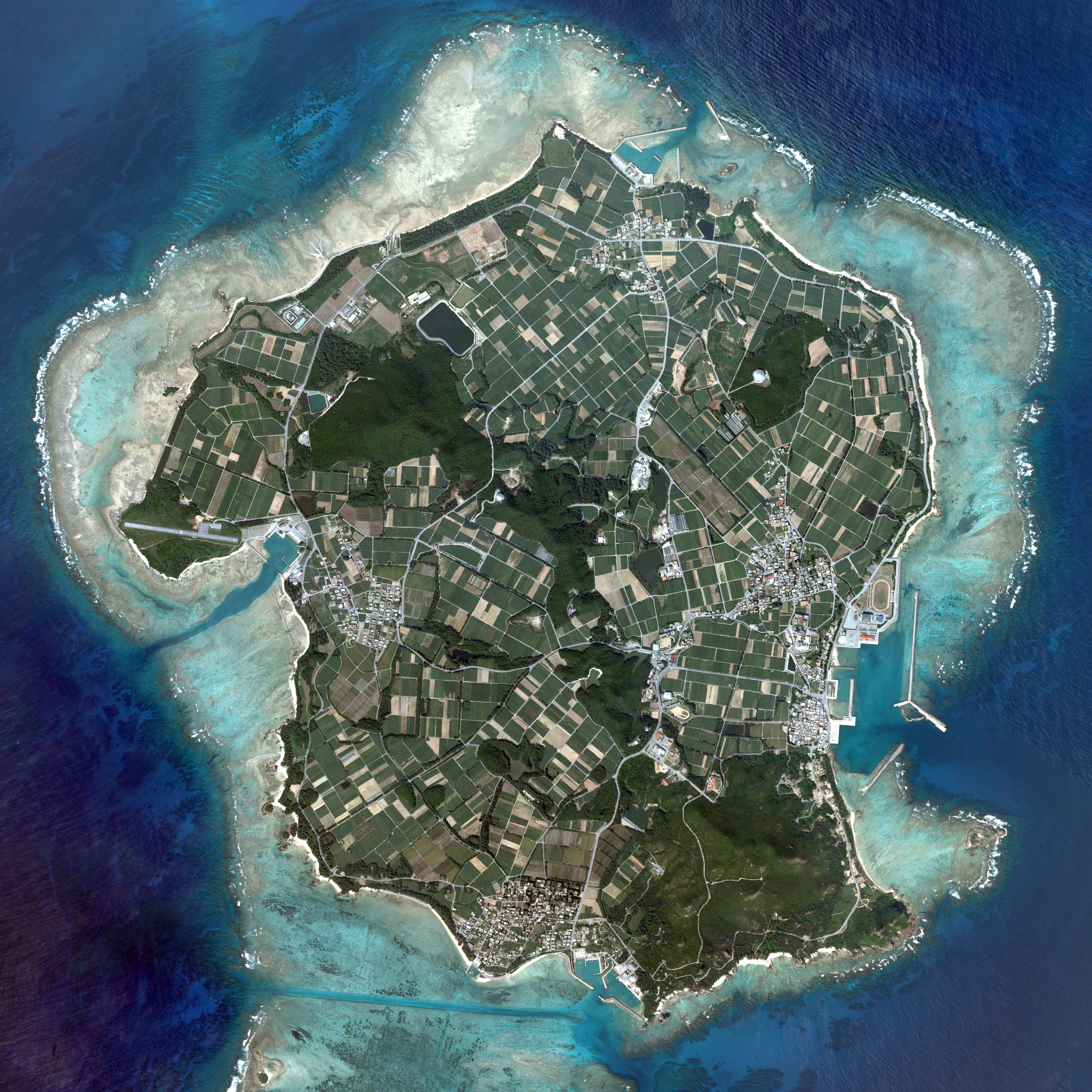
- Aerial view of Izena Island

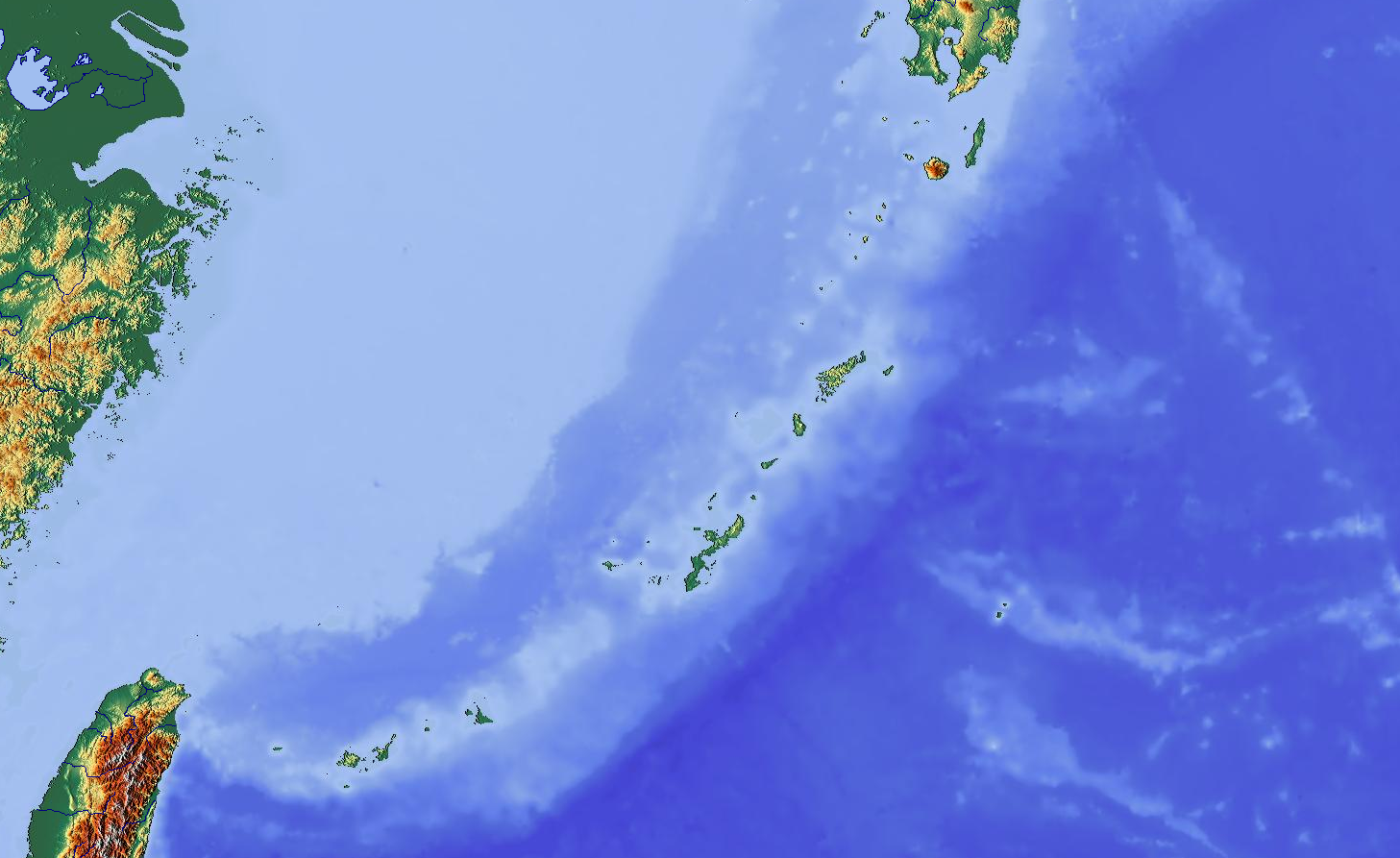
- Location within Ryukyu Islands

Geography
- Location: Pacific Ocean
- Coordinates: 26°56′10″N 127°56′12″E
- Archipelago: Okinawa Islands
- Area: 15.44 km^{2} (5.96 sq mi)

Administration
- Japan
- Prefecture: Okinawa Prefecture

Demographics
- Population: 1,764 (January 31, 2008)
- Pop. density: 114/km^{2} (295/sq mi)
- Ethnic groups: Ryukyuan, Japanese

Izena Island (Japanese: 伊是名島, Hepburn: Izena-jima; Okinawan: イジナ, romanized: Ijina) is located in the East China Sea, north-west of Okinawa Island, in the Ryukyu Islands of Japan. The island has a diameter of about 5 kilometres (3.1 mi) and is surrounded by coral reefs, blue sea, and white beaches. It is administered as Izena Village. The five settlements of about equal size and population which are located on the island are Izena, Nakada, Shomi, Uchihana, and Jicchaku (also called Serikyaku).

Izena village was the birthplace of King Shō En (1415–1476), the first king of the Second Shō dynasty of the Ryūkyū Kingdom. Shō Shishō (1402–1439), of the short lived First Shō dynasty, was also from Izena Island. The worshiping rites of Agari Umai (“worship from afar”) and the ritual of welcoming of sea deities are observed in this island. Izena Island is also the birthplace of the contemporary artist Naka Bokunen and musician Irei Shunichi (伊禮俊一).

The island is also associated with the pottery and archaeological ruins found here of the Okinawa's pre-historic Jōmon period (c. 14,000 BC – c. 300 BC). The island has historic sites such as Izena Tamaudun Mausoleum, Izena Castle, a historical fortress built around in the 14th century, and a park which has bronze statue of King Shō En when he was known as Uchima Kanemaru (内間金丸).

== Geography ==
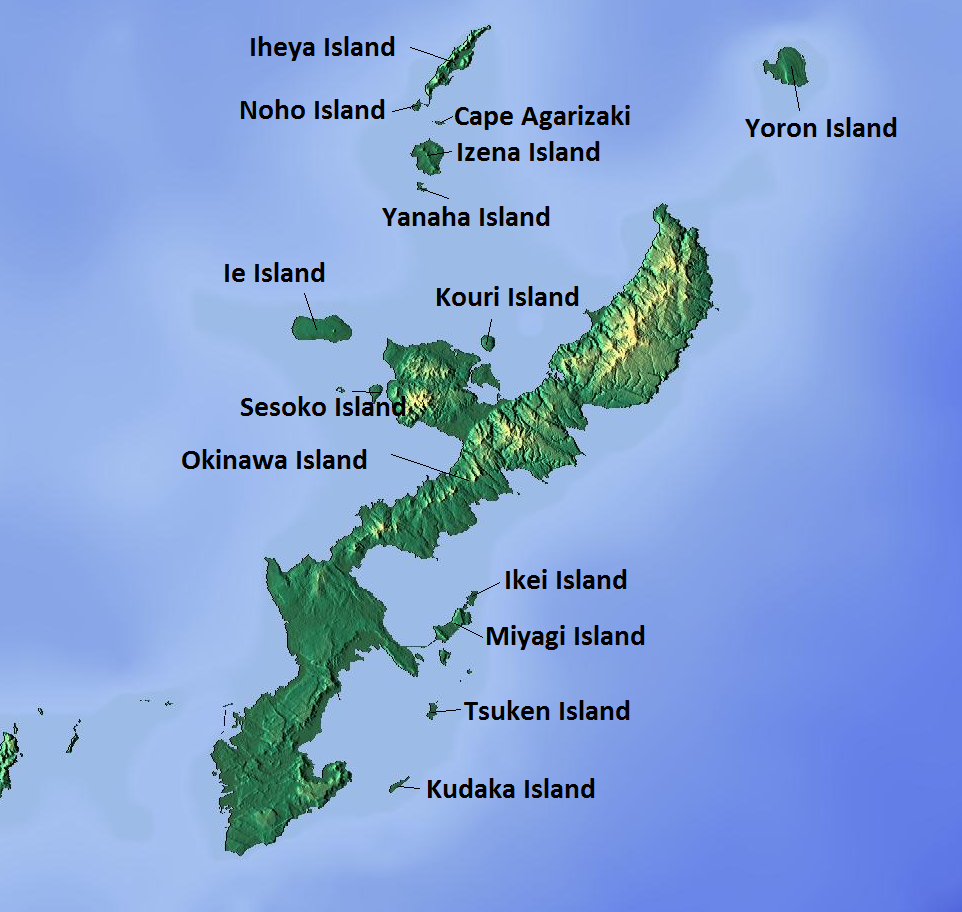
Map of the Okinawa Islands, showing the location of Izena Island to the northwest

Izena Island lies in the East China Sea, to the northwest of Okinawa Island, and southeast of Iheya Island. Noho Island lies off of Iheya Island's southern tip. Gushikawa Island and Cape Agarizaki lies between Iheya Island and Izena Island. Izena and Iheya are separated only by a narrow strait; the landscape of the two islands is alike with sugarcane fields and cattle farms.

The total area is 15.44 square kilometres (5.96 sq mi), and the peripheral sea coast line is 16 kilometres (9.9 mi). The island's topography features a series of mountains spanning from the northwest to the southeast of the island, with generally flat, arable land covering the remainder. The island has several white sandy beaches. Coral reefs form a lagoon or lake and are natural breakwaters. Izena's rocky southern coastline has rock formations such as 'Umi Gitara' and 'Agi Gitara', dramatically rising from the land and sea.

=== Climate ===
Climate data for Izena (1991−2020 normals, extremes 1977−present)
Month	Jan	Feb	Mar	Apr	May	Jun	Jul	Aug	Sep	Oct	Nov	Dec	Year
Record high °C (°F)	26.3 (79.3)	27.4 (81.3)	27.8 (82.0)	30.0 (86.0)	31.6 (88.9)	35.0 (95.0)	36.0 (96.8)	35.6 (96.1)	34.8 (94.6)	34.1 (93.4)	31.1 (88.0)	29.3 (84.7)	36.0 (96.8)
Mean daily maximum °C (°F)	19.1 (66.4)	19.4 (66.9)	21.2 (70.2)	23.6 (74.5)	26.3 (79.3)	29.2 (84.6)	31.8 (89.2)	31.7 (89.1)	30.5 (86.9)	27.7 (81.9)	24.5 (76.1)	20.9 (69.6)	25.5 (77.9)
Daily mean °C (°F)	16.6 (61.9)	16.7 (62.1)	18.3 (64.9)	20.7 (69.3)	23.4 (74.1)	26.4 (79.5)	28.6 (83.5)	28.6 (83.5)	27.5 (81.5)	25.1 (77.2)	22.0 (71.6)	18.5 (65.3)	22.7 (72.9)
Mean daily minimum °C (°F)	14.3 (57.7)	14.4 (57.9)	15.8 (60.4)	18.2 (64.8)	21.0 (69.8)	24.3 (75.7)	26.3 (79.3)	26.3 (79.3)	25.2 (77.4)	23.1 (73.6)	20.0 (68.0)	16.3 (61.3)	20.4 (68.8)
Record low °C (°F)	5.2 (41.4)	6.6 (43.9)	6.3 (43.3)	10.9 (51.6)	13.9 (57.0)	17.0 (62.6)	20.9 (69.6)	22.0 (71.6)	18.9 (66.0)	16.1 (61.0)	12.4 (54.3)	8.5 (47.3)	5.2 (41.4)
Average precipitation mm (inches)	99.3 (3.91)	108.2 (4.26)	155.6 (6.13)	157.5 (6.20)	222.1 (8.74)	304.5 (11.99)	153.1 (6.03)	159.6 (6.28)	146.1 (5.75)	140.1 (5.52)	111.8 (4.40)	100.3 (3.95)	1,858.4 (73.17)
Average precipitation days (≥ 1.0 mm)	11.6	11.0	12.6	11.5	11.8	11.9	6.6	9.1	9.7	8.9	8.4	10.7	123.8
Mean monthly sunshine hours	89.7	95.9	127.8	142.5	162.3	187.8	277.5	261.0	203.5	181.3	127.9	104.2	1,962.8
Source: JMA

== History ==
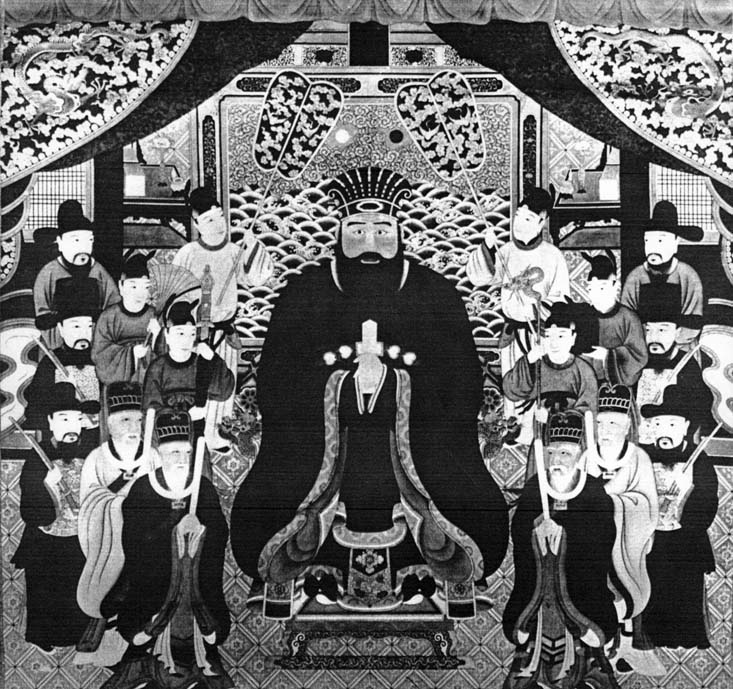
Painting of King Shō En, the first king of the Second Shō dynasty of the Ryūkyū Kingdom who was born in Izena Island

The island's settlement history goes back at least 3000 years. Archeological excavations have revealed many artifacts in the form of axes and knives made of stone and also pottery and human bones. The earliest recorded history is of five lineages lasting over 692 years in the period 1187 to 1879. The Second Shō dynasty ruled between 1470 and 1879, with the first king, Shō En, born on this island. Artifacts related to the period of this dynasty are seen in the village of Izena. King Shō En not only applied for “recognition and investiture to enhance the prestige and authority of his family among his countrymen” but had also built an elegant tomb on a small hill and consecrated the remains of his parents; his sister was appointed the chief Noro in Iheya. Sho En showed great reverence to his father and to the predecessors belonging to the royalty of the First Shō dynasty, whom he had replaced with the Shō Second dynasty. After the Battle of Okinawa and subsequent to liberation day after World War II, two Americans were beheaded on Izena Island. USS Bush and USS Drexler were sunk by kamikaze aircraft to the northwest of the island on 6 April 1945 and 28 May 1945 respectively.

== Economy ==
The island's main economic activity is centered around agricultural farming, fisheries and commerce. In 2003, Izena village was declared a "Tourism Village". Naka Bokunen, a well known woodblock artist of the village, also knowledgeable about its history and culture, has been assigned as a Tourism Ambassador and given the task of promoting tourism on the island. To promote environmental concerns and tourism, a tax called the “Izena Village Environmental Cooperation Tax”, a levy of 100 yen for every entry to the island, was introduced in 2005. Mozuke, a type of sea weed, is a major export; its production ranks third in Okinawa prefecture. It is harvested after a growth period of six months. The economy of the people is also sustained by tokobushi, a type of abalone; the process is being improved to offer a better yield. The total annual income of the villagers is reported to be 3.47 billion yen, giving a per capita income of 1.78 million yen per person, which is about the same as for the Okinawa Island.

== Monuments ==
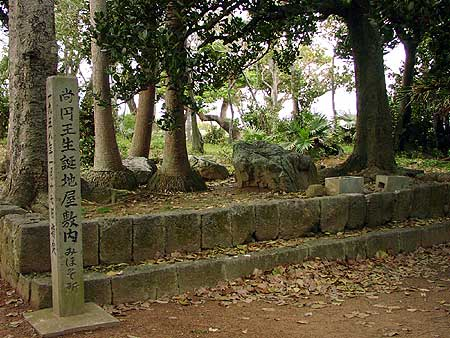
Shō En's birthplace in Mihoso-sho Park

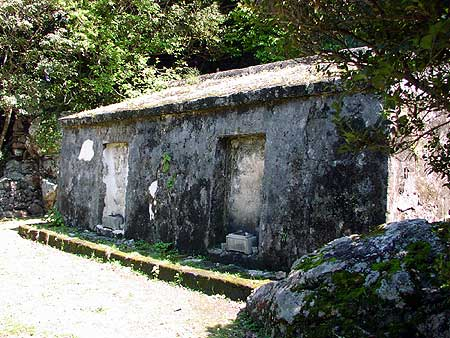
Izena Tamaudun Mausoleum

Three most prominent monuments on the island are: Izena Tamaudun Mausoleum, the historical fortress of Izena Castle, and a park which has a bronze statue of King Shō En. Izena Tamaudun Mausoleum was built in 1501, during the reign of King Shō Shin, near the Izena Castle. In 1958, Okinawa Prefecture designated this as a Historical Site. The royal mausoleum is of Shō Shishō, his wife, and daughter (the father, mother, and sister of King Shō Hashi). Izena Castle is a Ryūkyūan gusuku built around the 14th century by Samekawa, son of the Yogura Chief of Iheya Island. It is built over a limestone outcrop about 100 metres (330 ft) above sea level on the south eastern side of the island. The fortress has three sides which are near vertical cliffs; the south, west and east faces of the fortress are rock cliffs, while the northern side provides entry to the castle through a series of steps cut into the hill. There are several chambers in the castle which are separated by walls, built with piled-up pieces of coral limestone, 3 metres (9.8 ft) in height. The chambers have many sacred relics such as utaki (holy enclosures of the Ryūkyūan religion) and also celadons, Sueki wares, and other important objects, which are also seen in other gusuku sites. There is a bronze statue of Kanemeru, Shō En's name before his reign, in the park which commemorates his birth in Izena. The tomb holds the remains of Kanemaru.

== Culture ==
There is an ancient temple to God Asagi in Seriyaku settlement of Izena village. Festivals of harvest of rice, wheat, unzami and Shinigu and other products are held here. The temple is on the southern part of the island, which is built on four steel columns with a thatched roof of 5 metres (16 ft) square with eaves of 60 centimetres (24 in) height. The floor is made of mud and the temple belongs to the Tangible Race Cultural Heritage. A notable religious place in the island is the Akara utaki (meaning sacred place) which has two rocky boulders, named umi gitara (sea bluff) and agi gitara (land bluff). The word gitara is said to have originated from India. Ancestor worship is widely practiced which is a blend of Chinese and Korean beliefs locally adopted in which a mythical love story is linked to the two rocky bluffs of umi gitara and agi gitara said to represent the two lovers who died but made to live by god, as god wished it as if “gazing at each other from a close distance, they are forever in love.”

== Sport ==
Popular sports in the island are soccer, volleyball, and soft tennis. The "IZENA 88" Triathlon is a regular event that is organized during October every year, in Izena village, with participants from Japan and other parts of the world.

== Transport and education ==
Izena Island is accessible by the ferry New Izena, which makes two daily round trips between Nakada Port and Unten Port in Nakijin village, which is located north of Nago on Okinawa's main island. The ferry trip is approximately one hour in duration. There are no airports on the island; Naha Airport on the Okinawa Island offers the nearest air transport.

There are two schools on the island, the Izena Elementary School (151 students) and the Izena Junior High School (71 students), which are supported by the Japan Exchange and Teaching (JET) program with an Assistant Teacher in English language. However, for High School the students of the Island go to Okinawa Island.

According to a leprosy survey carried out in Okinawa Islands, it is reported that Izena Island is one of the highest leprosy endemic islands in the northern part of the Okinawa islands.

== Notable people ==
- Naka Bokunen
- Shō En
- Shō Shishō
- Irei Shunichi
