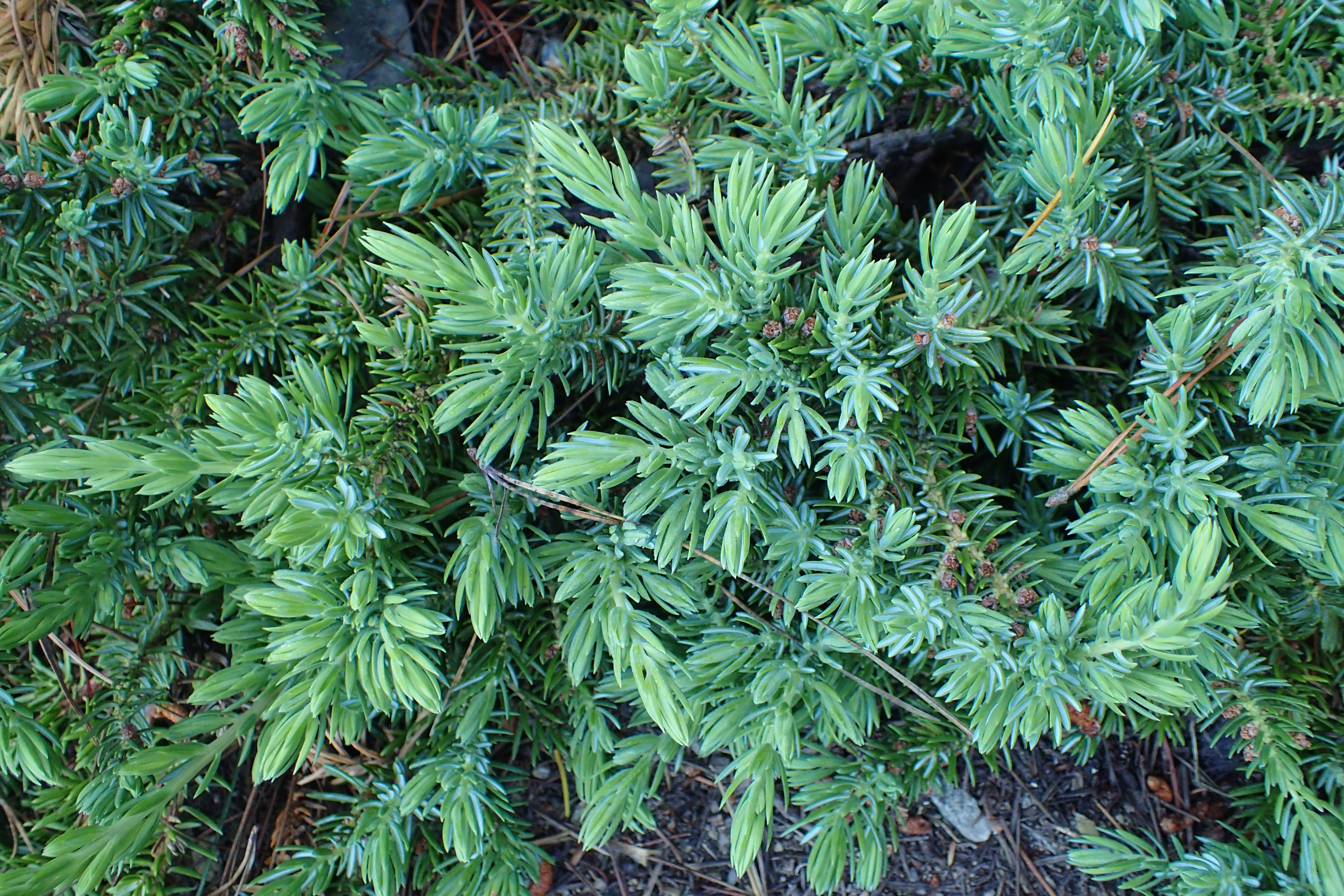

Conservation status
- Near Threatened (IUCN 3.1)

Scientific classification
- Kingdom: Plantae
- Clade: Tracheophytes
- Clade: Gymnospermae
- Division: Pinophyta
- Class: Pinopsida
- Order: Cupressales
- Family: Cupressaceae
- Genus: Juniperus
- Species: J. taxifolia

Binomial name
- Juniperus taxifolia Hook. & Arn.

= Juniperus taxifolia =

Species of conifer

Juniperus taxifolia (Bonin Islands juniper; Japanese: シマムロ Shimamuro) is a species of juniper, endemic to the Bonin Islands southeast of Japan.

It is an evergreen coniferous shrub growing to a height of 1–3 m (rarely a small tree to 13 m tall). The leaves are needle-like, in whorls of three, light green, 7–14 mm long and 1-1.5 mm broad, with a double white stomatal band (split by a green midrib) on the inner surface. It is dioecious, with separate male and female plants. The seed cones are berry-like, green ripening in 18 months to reddish-brown with a variable light waxy coating; they are spherical, 8–10 mm diameter, and have six or nine fused scales in two or three whorls of three; the three larger scales each with a single seed. The seeds are dispersed when birds eat the cones, digesting the fleshy scales and passing the hard seeds in their droppings. The pollen cones are yellow, 5 mm long.

Some authors include Juniperus lutchuensis from the Ryukyu Islands in J. taxifolia as a synonym, or variety, while others treat it as a distinct species as it has a distinct DNA profile.

Its conservation status, previously given as Data Deficient, is now listed as Vulnerable.
