= Raymond Normand =

French painter (1919–2000)

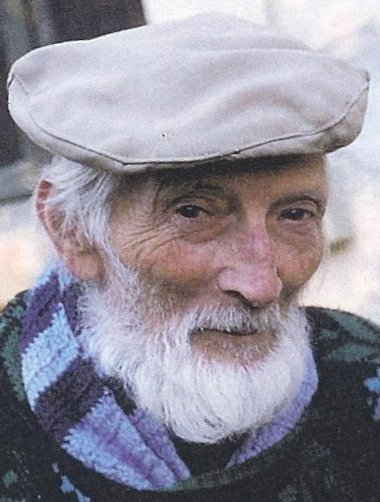
- Normand in 1998
- Born: 14 November 1919; Auby, France
- Died: 12 March 2000 (aged 80); Aix-en-Provence, France
- Resting place: Ventabren
- Style: Landscape

Raymond Normand (14 November 1919 – 12 March 2000) was a French painter.

== Early life and education ==
Raymond Normand was born on 14 November 1919 in Auby, Nord, a small industrial village located not far from Douai. He was the second child of Maria Duhem and Just Normand, who already had a daughter, Jeanne, five years older than he. His father had been a miner until he came back mutilated from World War I. Despite this he managed to work as an electrician. Raymond spent his first ten years in Flers-en-Escrebieux, living on the countryside in contact with nature, peasants and house animals.

From his very early years, he had expressed a passion for drawing and painting. Back in Auby, he attended the high school and the Art School in Douai. However, in 1934, he was forced to interrupt his studies because of a bone disease which kept him bedridden for two years. Although he had undergone several surgeries, he had to cope with the after effects for the rest of his life. Following his convalescence he decided to leave the high school in order to dedicate himself full-time to his studies at the Art School in Douai.

Because of their son's health, his parents decided to take him to the South of France. They settled in Marseille in 1937, and stayed there until 1941, Raymond attended sculpture and drawing classes at the art school. During that period, he met César Baldaccini, a famous French sculptor, with whom he stayed in contact for many years despite the different directions into which their art evolved.

In 1943, he was sent by the Vichy government to Nazi Germany for forced labor as part of Service du travail obligatoire during World War II. Due to his leg problem, he was assigned a job in an office.

== Career ==
After his return to France, he worked for farmers and looked after herds of goats in Lambesc, near Salon-de-Provence. At that time, his family was living in Grans. It was during this period that he discovered the natural beauty of the Provence, just as Vincent van Gogh had done in Arles. This southern part of France was so different from the flat and dull region where Normand had spent his childhood. Following in the footsteps of the Impressionists, he grew more and more eager to captivate on canvas the vibrating light and colors that dazzled the aspiring painter from the North for the rest of his life.

In 1950, Raymond Normand settled in Ventabren, not far from Aix-en-Provence, in the area called the Trou du Loup (Wolf's Hole), at the bottom of the village, in a small isolated house among pine and olive trees. He devoted the remainder of his years to his art, while living in this peaceful retreat with his parents, cats and goats.

Normand was mainly a landscape painter whose wide range of colors depicts the vibrating light and life of an unspoiled nature, as the hours of the day and the seasons of the year go by. The topics of his oil paintings with palette knife or brush, of his dry and soft oil pastels, of his Chinese pen or inkstick works and of his wash-drawings range from the countryside of Lambesc or Grans and the banks of the Touloubre River to the village of Ventabren and surroundings and the banks of the Arc River. Apart from self-portraits, he also painted his mother, father, family, friends and pets, as well as large pastoral scenes with unreal characters and sometimes a few caricatures.

He actually acquired some fame, although, living away from the art market, he did not try to become famous. Not only his friends but also many art collectors from France and abroad have been coming to the Trou du Loup.

Raymond Normand died on 12 March 2000 in Aix-en-Provence. The Town Council of Ventabren, where he was buried, has inherited his properties and works.
