= Naondo Nakamura =

Japanese painter and sculptor

Naondo Nakamura (中村 直人, Nakamura Naondo; 19 May 1905 – 22 April 1981) was a Japanese painter and sculptor.

Naondo Nakamura was born in Nagano Prefecture in 1905.

In 1920 he studied wood sculpture at the Nihon Bijutsuin with Hakurei Yoshida. His first exhibition in 1924 was as part of the school's "Inten" exhibition.

Nakamura began painting in 1942 he drew illustrations for Asahi Shinbun's serial novel "Kaigun". He worked in Paris from 1953 to 1964. When he returned to Japan, he returned to sculpture and joined the Nikakai. He won the Prime Minister's award at the Nikakai's 65th exhibition.

Nakamura died of sepsis on 22 April 1981.
