= Isabel Naftel =

English painter (1832-1912)

- Born: Isabel Oakley; 1832
- Died: 1912 (aged 79–80)
- Notable work: A Little Red Riding Hood (1862); Musing (1869); A Sark Cottage (1885)
- Spouse: Paul Jacob Naftel
- Children: Maud Naftel
- Father: Octavius Oakley

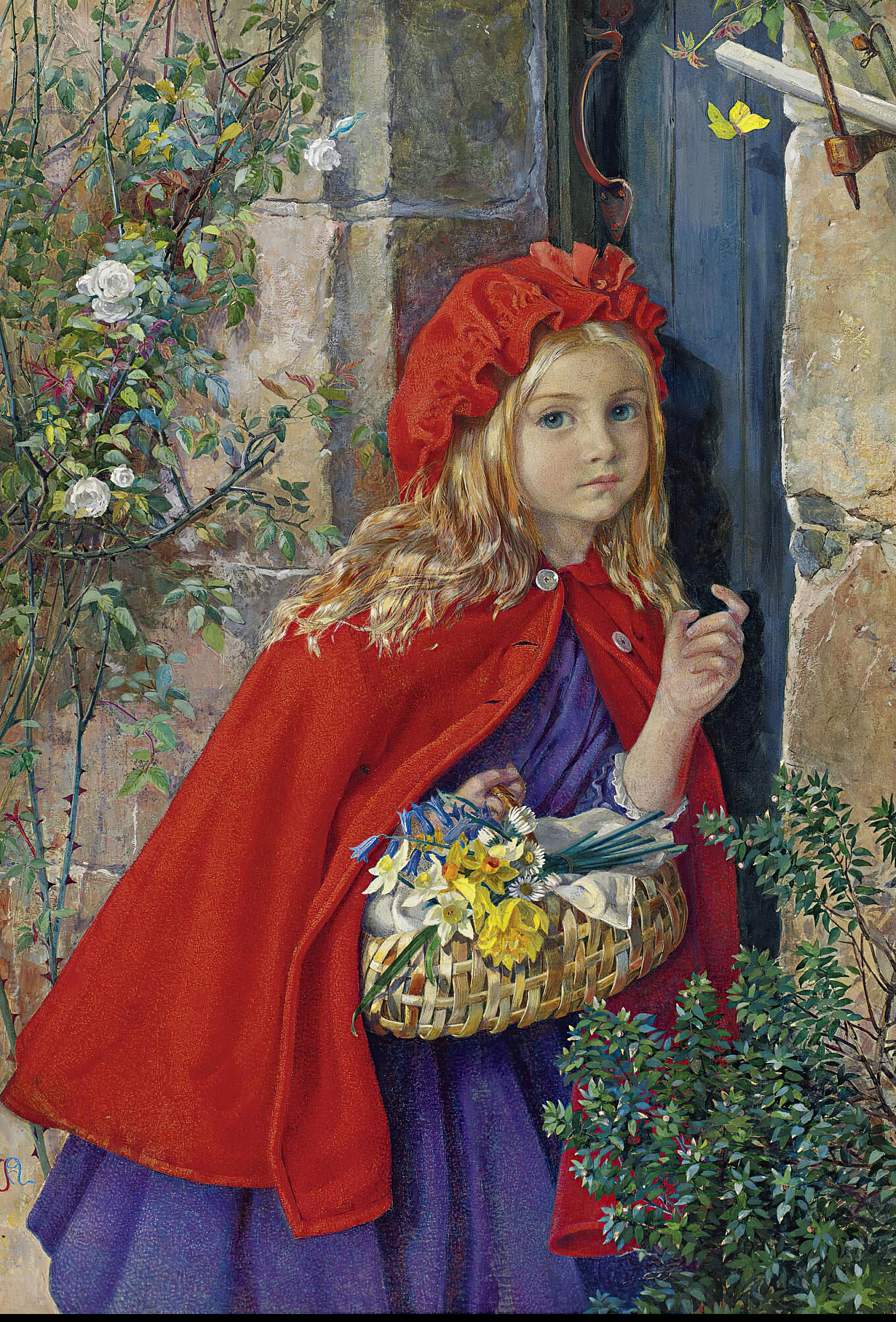
Little Red Riding Hood (1862)

Isabel Naftel, née Oakley, (baptised 20 July 1832, died 1912) was a British artist known for her portrait, genre and landscape paintings.

== Biography ==
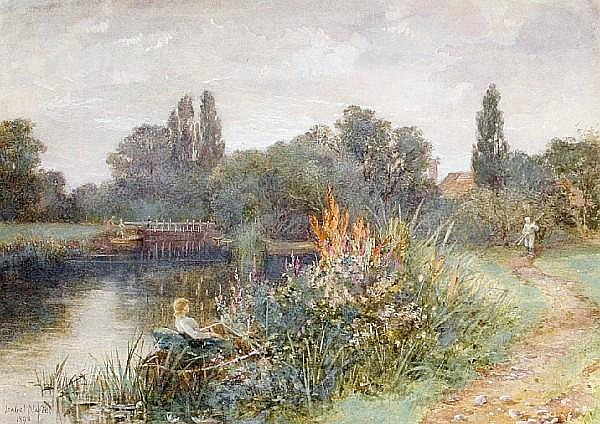
Waiting (1890)

Isabel Oakley was the youngest of the three daughters of the, then, Derby based artist Octavius Oakley and his wife Maria Moseley. Her genre and portrait paintings, and landscapes of the English south coast and the Channel Islands were shown on a regular basis in London during the Victorian era. Between 1857 and 1891, she had 54 works accepted for public exhibition. Ten of Neftel's paintings were included in exhibitions at the Royal Academy and she had 13 works accepted by the Society of British Artists and nine pieces by the New Watercolour Society. Among her works shown at the Royal Academy were A Little Red Riding Hood in 1862, Musing in 1869 and A Sark Cottage in 1885. Works by her were also shown at the Grosvenor Gallery and at the New Gallery.

== Private life ==
In 1853 Isabel Oakley married the artist Paul Jacob Naftel and the couple subsequently had a daughter, Maud, who also became a notable artist.
