= Paul Jacob Naftel =

British painter

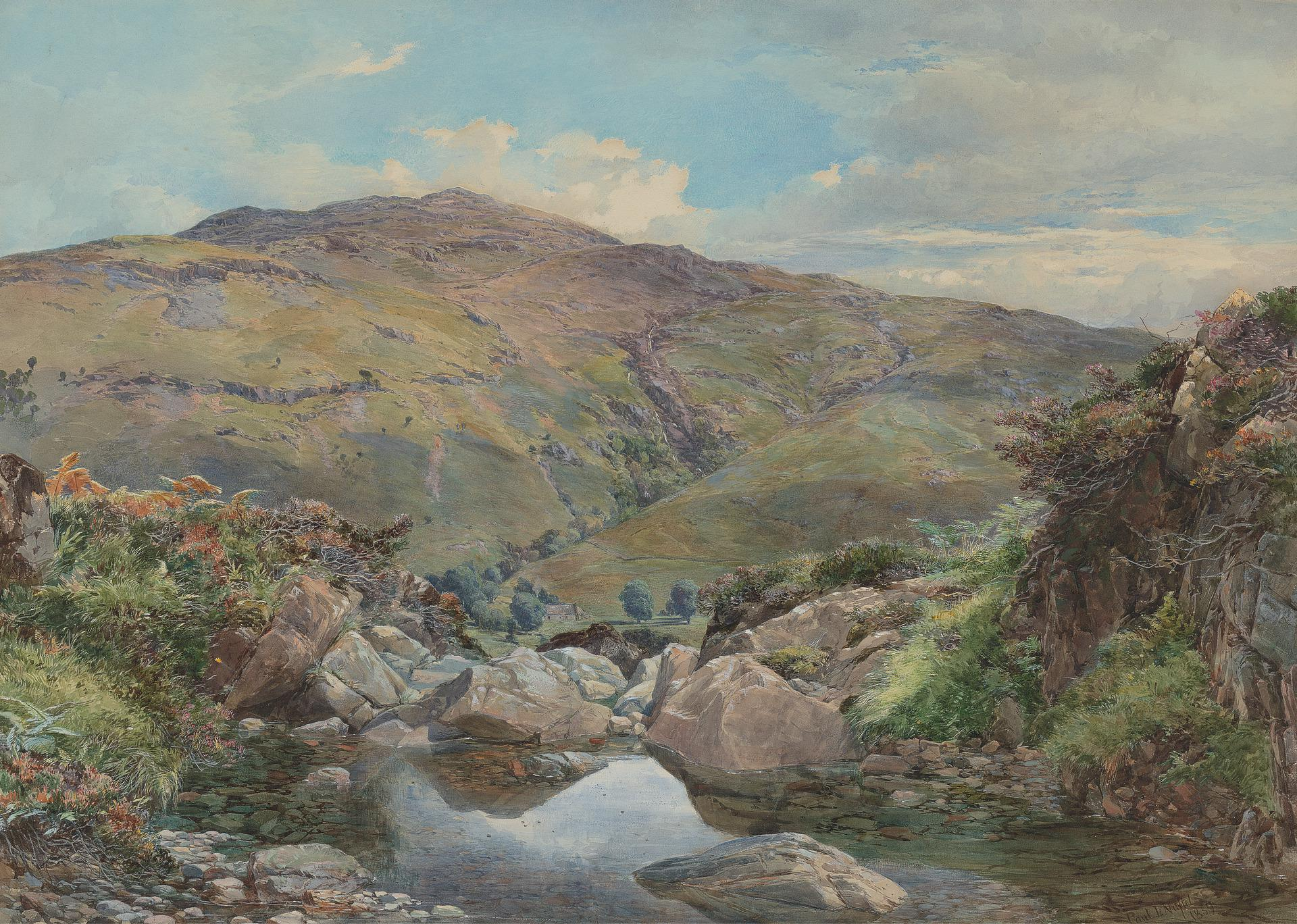
Head of Loch Lomond, with Ben Lomond in the Distance, watercolour

Paul Jacob Naftel (10 September 1817 – 13 September 1891) was a watercolour painter from Guernsey, the only Guernsey-born professional painter of the 19th century.

== Biography ==
Naftel was born on 10 September 1817 in Guernsey. He was a self-taught artist and taught drawing at Elizabeth College on Guernsey.

Naftel was extremely prolific, producing over 1000 works during his lifetime, mostly of landscape subjects. He came to particular prominence when he recorded Queen Victoria's visit to Guernsey in 1846, with the resulting prints published in The Illustrated London News. In 1856 he was elected to the Society of Painters in Water Colours.

He married twice. His second wife, Isabel Oakley, was an artist and the youngest daughter of his longtime friend Octavius Oakley. Naftel's second marriage produced two sons and a daughter including Maud Naftel (1856–1890) who was also a successful artist.

Naftel moved to London in 1870, where he had a highly successful solo exhibition at the gallery of the Fine Art Society. At his art studio in Chelsea, London he taught Rose Maynard Barton and Mildred Anne Butler.

He died in Strawberry Hill near London on 13 September 1891.
