= Maud Naftel =

English painter

- Born: 1856
- Died: 1890 (aged 33–34); Chelsea, London
- Education: Slade School of Art
- Occupation: Painter
- Known for: Watercolour painting
- Parent(s): Paul Jacob Naftel and Isabel Naftel

Maud Naftel (1856–1890) was a British watercolourist.

== Life ==
Naftel was born in 1856, the daughter of Isabel Oakley and Paul Jacob Naftel who were both watercolour painters. She has been reported as an only child, but it is thought that another artist named Isabel Naftel was her sister. Maud was trained in painting by her father, at the Slade School of Fine Art and by Carolus-Duran in Paris.

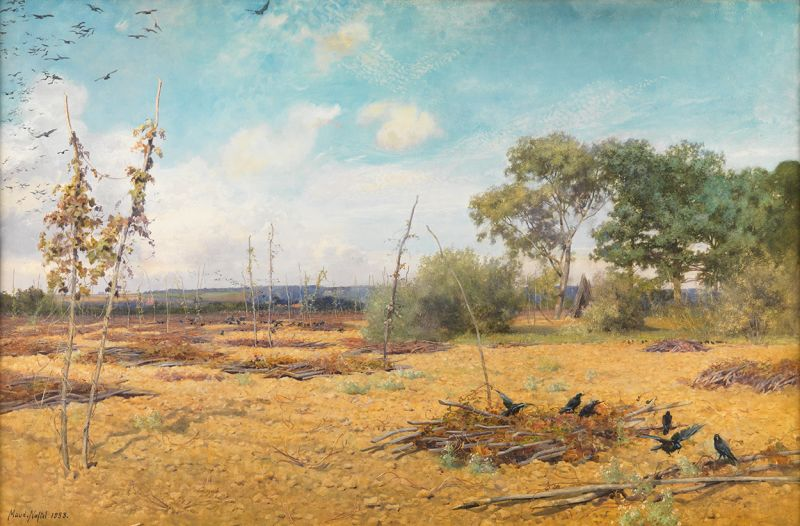
1888 painting by Naftel of Horsmonden

Naftel exhibited at the Dudley Art Gallery and with their Society. She was considered to the "only true" flower painter, as her parents, her sister and her two painting aunts had different or wider painting interests. Her illustrated book Flowers and How to Paint Them was published in 1886 and it became a standard work.

Naftel died in London in 1890 at her father's home in Chelsea. She was one of the first people to be cremated at Woking Crematorium. She had been a member of the Cremation Society of Great Britain.
