= Naka Bokunen =

Japanese artist

Naka Bokunen (名嘉 睦稔; born 1953) is an artist from Okinawa, Japan, famous for his brightly coloured prints of Okinawan landscapes. Many of these prints are of, or inspired by, the island of Izena in the north of Okinawa, where he was born.

Naka Bokunen has been involved in collaborations with, among others, the novelist Banana Yoshimoto and the biologist James Lovelock.
