= Sugawara Denju Tenarai Kagami =

1746 Japanese play

Sugawara Denju Tenarai Kagami 菅原伝授手習鑑
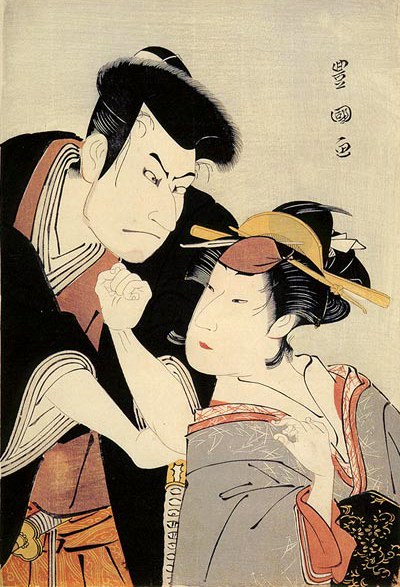
- Nakazō Nakamura II as Matsuō-maru (left) and Noshio Nakamura II as Chiyo in the May 1796 production of Terakoya from Sugawara Denju Tenarai Kagami, by Toyokuni.
- Original language: Japanese
- Written by: Takeda Izumo I Takeda Izumo II; Miyoshi Shōraku; Namiki Sōsuke
- Characters: Kan Shōjō, Fujiwara no Tokihira, Umeōmaru, Sakuramaru, Matsuōmaru
- Genre: jidaimono
- Setting: Various sites in Japan

Premiere
- Date: August 1746, Takemoto-za, Osaka (jōruri); September 1746, Kitagawa no Shibai, Kyoto (kabuki)
- Place: Japan

Sugawara Denju Tenarai Kagami (Note: Japanese pronunciation: [sɯ.ɡa.wa.ɾa deꜜɲ.dʑɯ | te.na.ɾai kaꜜ.ɡa.mʲi, sɯ.ŋa- -ŋa.mʲi],) (Note: The title is frequently translated as "Sugawara no Michizane and the Secrets of Calligraphy" or variations thereof. It might more literally be translated as "A Mirror of Sugawara's Instruction by Hand.") (菅原伝授手習鑑) is a mid-Edo puppet theatre (jōruri) play that was adapted into the kabuki repertoire. It was jointly written by Takeda Izumo I, Takeda Izumo II, Namiki Sōsuke and Miyoshi Shōraku. Along with Yoshitsune Senbon Zakura and Kanadehon Chūshingura, it is one of the three most famous and popular plays in the kabuki repertoire. Sugawara was first performed as a puppet play in August 1746 at the Takemoto-za in Osaka, debuting on the kabuki stage the following month in Kyoto. The Edo debut was held at the Ichimura-za the following March.

The play is set in the 9th century, and is based on the life of Heian period court noble and government official Sugawara no Michizane (referred to as Kan Shōjō in the play), who was exiled to Kyushu when he lost favor at court and was falsely accused of conspiring to seize the throne. A fictional set of triplets named Umeōmaru, Sakuramaru, and Matsuōmaru, characters invented for the play, also play a major role, each individually proving their loyalty and service to Kan Shōjō in different scenes. The antagonist is Fujiwara no Shihei (藤原時平), whose name is written with the same kanji as the historical Fujiwara no Tokihira of Fujiwara clan.

Like most full-length five-act kabuki plays, Sugawara Denju Tenarai Kagami is very rarely performed in full. Instead, a selection of scenes will be chosen, or a single scene will be combined with scenes from other plays, dance dramas, or other pieces to form a day's program. The most popular, and most frequently performed, scene from this play is Terakoya ("temple school"), the third scene of Act IV. The Kurumabiki (Act III, first scene) scene is considered to be a paragon of the aragoto form, and of the essence of kabuki.

The play was brought to Europe by the early 20th century and translated into French and German; it was the basis for Felix Weingartner's opera Die Dorfschule, as well as an early work by Carl Orff.

== Structure ==
The fullest version of Sugawara consists of twelve scenes in five acts. Though this was originally intended to be performed across the better part of a day, modes of performance have changed, and the full version would today take twice that long, due to the style and speed of current forms of acting.

For this reason and others, kabuki plays are almost never performed in their entirety today, and Sugawara is no exception. The fullest standard version of any play is called tōshi kyōgen, which in the case of Sugawara consists of six of the full twelve scenes. However, again as is the case with most plays, individual scenes or elements of Sugawara may be performed alone as part of a day's program of other such bits and pieces.

Two of the scenes, Yasui no Hama (Act II, second scene) and Kitasaga (Act IV, second scene), have only been performed in bunraku, never yet in kabuki.

The last time Sugawara Denju Tenarai Kagami was performed in its entirety (the ten kabuki scenes) was in 1966 at the National Theatre, Tokyo. The full length performance was divided into two programs, the first one in November (from Act I to scene I of Act II) and the second one in December (scene I of Act II to Act V).

From those ten scenes, the six that are still performed regularly (Kamo Zutsumi, Hippô Denju, Dômyôji, Kurumabiki, Ga no Iwai and Terakoya). This is the tōshi kyōgen of Sugawara Denju Tenarai Kagami.

The only performance after World War II of the other four scenes (Ôuchi, Michiyuki Kotoba no Amaikai, Tenpaizan and Ôuchi Tenpen) was that of 1966, with the exception of Ôuchi, which was performed again at the National Theatre in 1981.

The fundamental structure of the play is very much in keeping with that of Japanese traditional drama forms as a whole. The philosophy of jo-ha-kyū is employed throughout, as actions, scenes, acts, and the play as a whole begin slow (jo), then get faster (ha), and end quickly (kyū). Also, Sugawara follows the traditional five-act structure and the themes traditionally associated with particular acts. Act One begins calmly and auspiciously, including scenes at the Imperial Palace. Act Two features combat and murder. Act Three is something of a sewamono insertion into the jidaimono tale, turning away from the affairs of warriors and politics to focus on the lives of commoners. Act Four, often in other plays a michiyuki journey, metaphorically associated with a journey through hell, features a dramatic storm and an emotional journey for Kan Shōjō. Shōjō becomes enraged at the traitorous activities of Shihei and kills himself, becoming a thunder god. Act Five wraps up the plot quickly and returns to themes of auspiciousness.

== Plot summary ==
The following plot summary is based on the full twelve-scene version. The characters of Sakuramaru, Umeōmaru, and Matsuōmaru are triplets who have been the beneficiaries of Kan Shōjō's favor in the past, having been placed as retainers to court officials.

=== Act I ===
==== The Imperial Palace (Ôuchi) ====
The play opens as an envoy from China arrives to paint a portrait of the emperor. The emperor is sick, however, and so a stand-in needs to be chosen; Shihei volunteers himself, an indication or reflection of his own lofty goals, but at the suggestion of Kan Shōjō and the decision of the emperor, Prince Tokiyo is chosen. As Tokiyo's love, Kariya, is the adopted daughter of Kan Shōjō, Shihei sees this as favoritism, and is disturbed. The emperor also orders Kan Shōjō to pass on his secrets of calligraphy to a disciple of his choice.

==== The Banks of the Kamo River (Kamo Zutsumi) ====
The second scene features a meeting between Prince Tokiyo and Kariya, arranged by Sakuramaru. Kariya being a commoner, only adopted into the world of the imperial court, their love is taboo. When the meeting is discovered by one of Shihei's agents, the couple are forced to flee and hide, and Sakuramaru is disgraced.

==== The Transmission of the Secrets of Calligraphy (Hippô Denju) ====
Kan Shōjō passes on his secrets to Genzō, a former disciple of his who had been banished from the court after falling in love with a lady-in-waiting named Tonami. Kan Shōjō is later called before the emperor, but loses his hat, an ill omen. He is accused by Shihei of plotting, through the marriage of Kariya to Tokiyo, to seize power, and is subsequently exiled to Dazaifu. Genzō and Tonami, with the help of Umeōmaru, take Kan Shōjō's son, Kan Shūsai, with them to their small school in the provinces, in order to keep him safe from Shihei and his schemes.

=== Act II ===
==== At the Dômyôji Temple (Dômyôji) ====
The second act takes place at the Buddhist temple Dōmyō-ji, where Kan Shōjō waits for his escort to Dazaifu, and where Kariya stays with her older sister Tatsuta. Kariya is scolded and beaten by her mother, Kakuju, who blames her affair with Prince Tokiyo for the accusations against Kan Shōjō, her father, and for his exile.

Meanwhile, Sukune Tarō and his father Haji no Hyōe, who are in service to Shihei, prepare to assassinate Kan Shōjō. The minister's escort is meant to arrive at daybreak, and so his arrival will be signaled by a rooster's crow. Tarō and Hyōe kill Tatsuta, Tarō's wife, and throw her body into a nearby pond; they hold a rooster over the corpse, and its crows, as Japanese superstition holds it would. The false escort prepared by Tarō and Hyōe to take Kan Shōjō away thus leaves with his passenger.

Kakuju, discovering her daughter's body, and realizing what has happened, attacks and stabs Tarō. The real escort then arrives for Kan Shōjō, learns that the minister already left in a different palanquin, and prepares to set off to find him. Just then, the false escort returns, having realized he had been tricked with a wooden statue of the minister; several times in this scene, Kan Shōjō demonstrates the mysterious ability to transform into, or otherwise replace himself with, a wooden statue. He emerges from the palanquin, and the false escort is arrested and Hyōe executed, before the minister leaves with the real escort, to a tearful farewell, bound for his exile in Dazaifu.

=== Act III ===
As is standard in five-act bunraku and kabuki plays, the middle act departs from the main characters, the nobility and politics, focusing on a different set of characters, usually commoners. The third act of Sugawara features triplets, Umeōmaru, Sakuramaru, and Matsuōmaru, each a loyal retainer to one of the play's chief characters (Kan Shōjō, Prince Tokiyo, and Shihei, respectively). The triplets each wear a symbol on their sleeve to identify them: Ume, Sakura, and Matsu are the Japanese words for plum blossom, cherry blossom, and pine respectively. They are also distinguished by their makeup and acting style. Sakuramaru is a romantic and gentle type, in the wagoto fashion, Umeōmaru is a hero in aragoto style, with bright red face makeup, and Matsuōmaru is a villain, his face painted with blue lines.

==== The Struggle for the Carriage (Kurumabiki) ====
This famous scene, "a classic example of Kabuki's stylized beauty", takes place in front of the Yoshida Shrine in Kyoto. The scene opens as Umeōmaru and Sakuramaru try to stop Shihei's carriage, and are confronted by Matsuōmaru, a member of the entourage. As the pair begin to unlash the oxen and tear apart the carriage, Shihei emerges, his blue face makeup marking him as a villain. He glares at them malevolently, halting their attack.

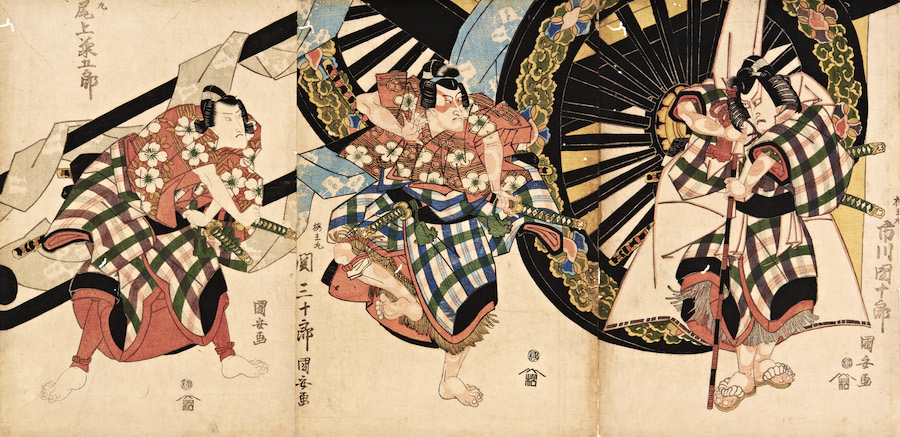
Ichikawa Danjuro VII as Matsuomaru, by Utagawa Kuniyasu

==== The Celebration (Ga no Iwai) ====
In the second scene, the triplets travel to the home of their father, Kan Shōjō's aged retainer Shiradayū, in Sata Village, for the festive celebration of his 70th birthday. The three soon begin fighting but, with no swords at hand, attack one another with bales of hay. Though only fighting with hay and other common objects, the fight scene is executed in the same style and manner as the greatest of aragoto fight scenes. In the course of the fight, a branch from Kan Shōjō's favorite cherry tree (sakura) is snapped off. Shiradayū notices this, and points it out as an omen, representing Sakuramaru's responsibility for Kan Shōjō's downfall, as he was the one who helped bring Tokiyo and Kariya together. Kan Shōjō arrives and, together with Shiradayū, chastise Matsuōmaru and banish him from their service; Sakuramaru then emerges and announces his decision to commit ritual suicide, in order to atone for his wrongdoing. Shiradayū strikes a bell as his son dies.

=== Act IV ===
==== Mount Tenpai (Tenpaizan) ====
The first scene of Act IV takes place at Kan Shōjō's mansion in Dazaifu, where he has been exiled. He reminisces about his favorite plum tree (ume), which suddenly appears there before him, having uprooted itself and flown to Dazaifu from the capital. Kan Shōjō and Shiradayū are admiring the blossoms when Umeōmaru arrives with a captive: Washizuka Heima, a minion of Shihei's.

Heima, tied up with rope, reveals Shihei's plot to seize power, describing each detail and he bemoans his fate, having failed in his mission to kill Kan Shōjō, and having been captured. Hearing of Shihei's treachery, Kan Shōjō becomes enraged, breaking off a branch from the plum tree and striking off Heima's head with it, as if it were a sword. He asks Shiradayū and Umeōmaru to hurry to the capital, to warn the emperor of Shihei's plans. Knowing that he cannot return to the capital himself, at least not in body, having been formally exiled, he vows to return as an angry spirit. To that end, he vows to journey to the summit of Mount Tenpai, where he will engage in austere disciplines, swear oaths to the gods, and become a ghostly lord of thunders. As he speaks, a storm rises up. His retainers grasp at his sleeves and try to stop him, but he throws them off, and flies off into the sky, already beginning to transform into a thunder spirit.

==== The Village School (Terakoya) ====
This scene is among the most popular, and most frequently performed, scenes in the play. It takes place at the provincial school run by Genzō and Tonami, where they are watching over the young Kan Shūsai. Shihei suspects that this is where the minister's son is being hidden, and sends Matsuōmaru there to kill the boy and return with his head; among all of Shihei's retainers, only Matsuōmaru is trusted to identify the boy's head. In this scene, Matsuōmaru is dressed in a dark kimono with snow and pine motifs, his hair wild and busy, a sign of the tragedy which is to come, and of the illness which he claims in order to quit Shihei's service.

Seeking to atone for his past wrongdoings, Matsuōmaru plots to save Kan Shūsai's life, at the cost of that of his own son, Kotarō. He sends Kotarō to the school, where Genzō and Tonami decide he is the only one at the school whose head could pass for Kan Shūsai's. This scene is a classic example of the conflict between giri (honor, fealty) and ninjō (human compassion), as Genzō and Tonami sacrifice an innocent boy to save their master's son. When the sound of Genzō's sword striking off Kotarō's head is heard from offstage, Matsuōmaru strikes a distinctive Matsuō mie pose, expressing his suppressed anguish. He then departs with the head in a box, to identify it for Shihei as Kan Shūsai's head, pretending to have done the deed and thus saving Kan Shūsai's life.

Matsuōmaru's wife, Chiyo, arrives at the school to pick up her son, and Genzō and Tonami fear for a moment that they may have to kill her too, rather than reveal their deception. But Matsuōmaru himself arrives, and explains to all involved that the boy killed was his own son, and that he did this intentionally, in order to make up for his past transgressions against Kan Shōjō and the Court, and his involvement in Shihei's schemes.

The scene has been the basis of two operas, both in German: in 1913 as Gisei: Das Opfer by Carl Orff, who freely adapted the translation by Karl Florenz (premiere 30 January 2010 in Stuttgart), and in 1918 as Die Dorfschule by Felix Weingartner.

=== Act V ===
==== Disaster at the Imperial Palace (Ôuchi Tenpen) ====
The single scene of Act V is only rarely performed in bunraku, and never in kabuki. It takes place in the Imperial Palace in Kyoto where a storm rages. In the aftermath of Kan Shōjō's death, discussions are held regarding the succession of Kan Shūsai, his son, to the head of the Sugawara clan. Though the clan is currently in disgrace, Prince Tokiyo argues that the storm must be caused by Kan Shōjō's angry spirit, and that acknowledging his innocence and restoring the honor of his family by making Shūsai its head would appease him.

Shihei grabs Kan Shūsai, threatening to kill him, and declaring that nothing, not even a thunder god, will stand in the way of him overthrowing the emperor and seizing power for himself. Bolts of lightning slay his minions, as Shihei stands firm. The young Kan Shūsai slips away as the ghosts of Sakuramaru and his wife appear, and attack Shihei. The Buddhist priest Hosshō rubs his rosaries and chants prayers to drive the ghosts off, but stops when he learns of Shihei's evil schemes. The ghosts attack Shihei once again, with sakura branches, and kill him. The storm dispels and the ghosts depart.

The play ends with the priest Hosshō declaring Kan Shūsai the successor to the Sugawara house, and the posthumous conferral upon Kan Shōjō of the Senior First Court Rank. He declares that a shrine should be constructed at Kitano to honor the minister, who shall now be worshipped as a god (kami) of scholarship.

== Gallery ==
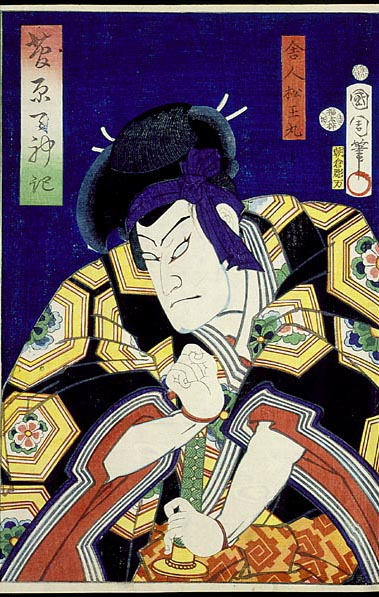
Unnamed actor in the role of Toneri Umemaru in Sugawara no Michizane, circa 1860–1866, Toyohara Kunichika

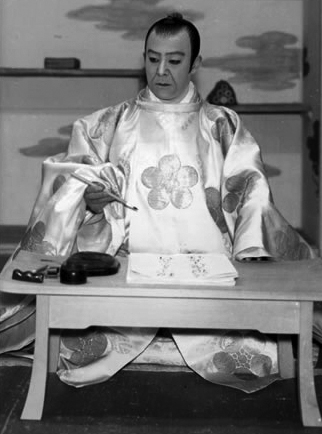
Kikugorō Onoe VI (1885–1949) as Kan Shōjō

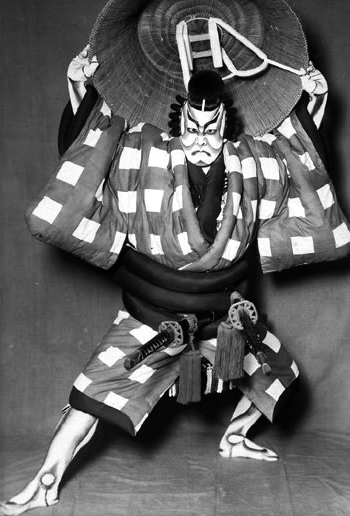
Kikugorō Onoe VI as Umeō-maru

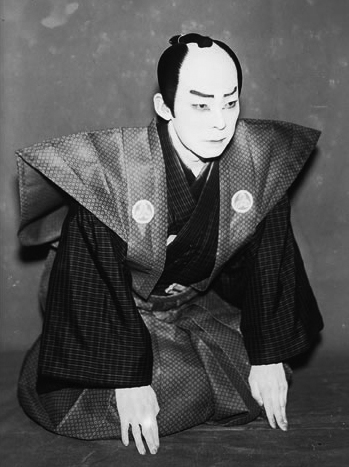
Kichiemon Nakamura I (1886–1954) as Takebe Genzō

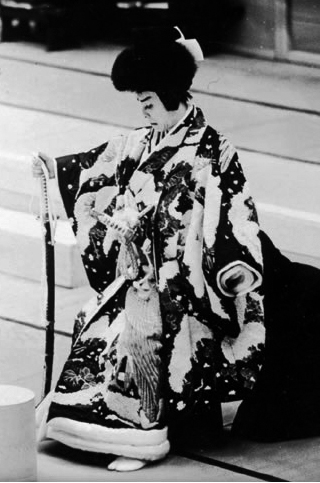
Kichiemon Nakamura I as Matsuō-maru

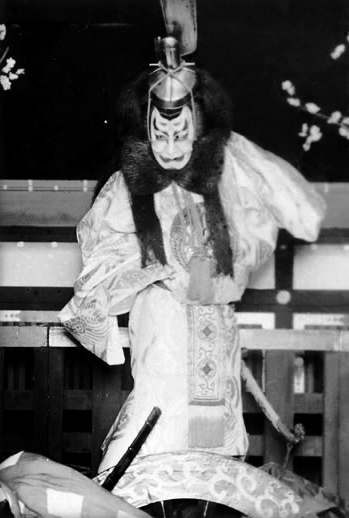
Kōshirō Matsumoto VII (1870–1949) as Fujiwara no Shihei
