= Yoshitsune Senbon Zakura =

Japanese Kabuki play

Yoshitsune and the Thousand Cherry Trees 義経千本桜
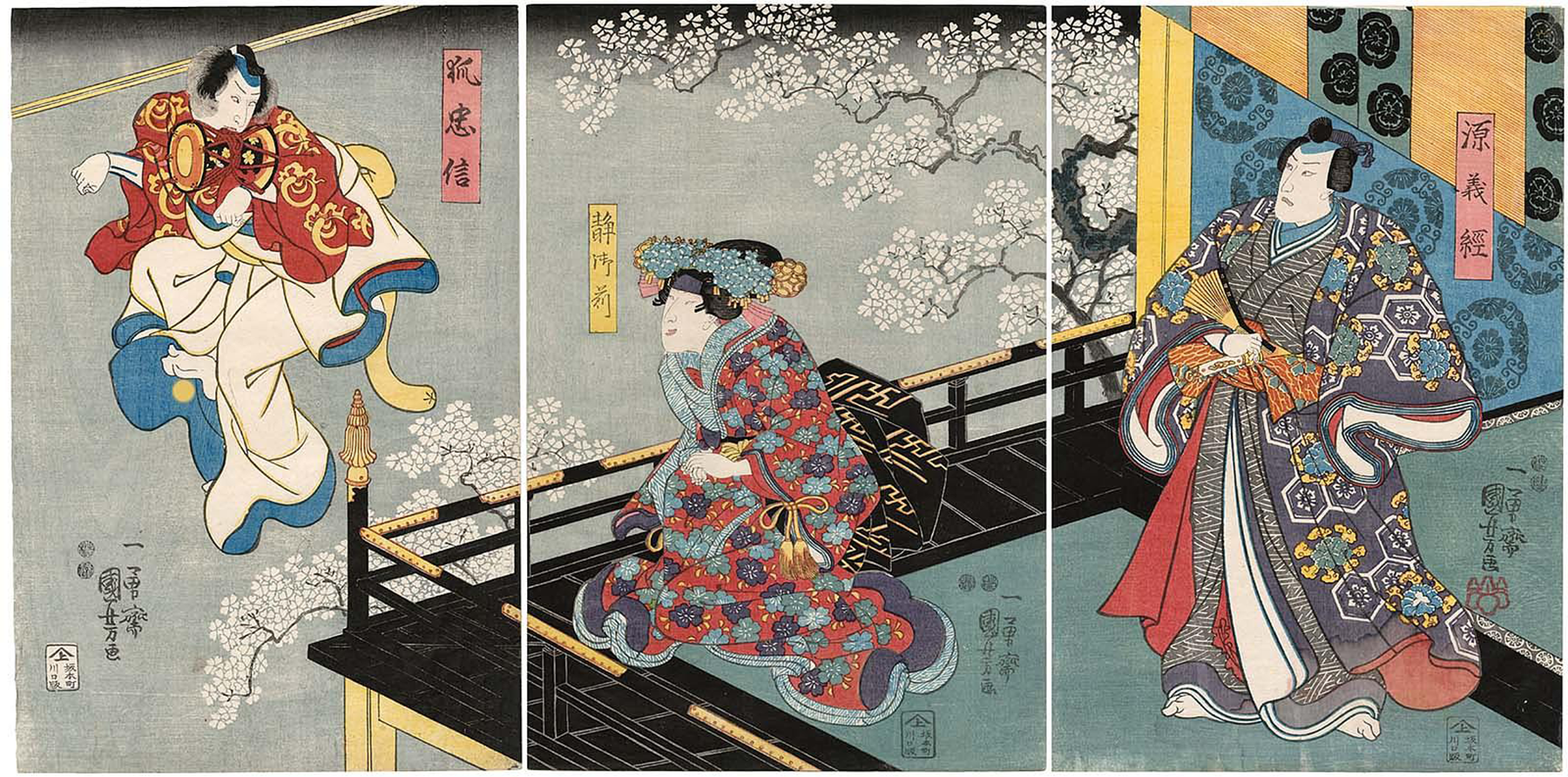
- Actors Ichikawa Danjûrô VIII as Minamoto Yoshitsune (R), Bandô Shûka I as Shizuka Gozen (C), and Ichikawa Kodanji IV as Fox (Kitsune) Tadanobu (L)
- Original language: Japanese
- Written by: Takeda Izumo II; Miyoshi Shōraku; Namiki Senryū I
- Characters: Yoshitsune; Benkei; Shizuka; Tomomori; Koremori; Noritsune; Tadanobu; others
- Genre: Jidaimono
- Setting: Various sites in Japan

Premiere
- Date: November 1747, Takemoto-za, Osaka (jōruri); January 1748, Ise (kabuki)
- Place: Japan

Yoshitsune Senbon Zakura (義経千本桜; Japanese pronunciation: [jo.ɕi̥.tsɯꜜ.ne | sem.bon.dzaꜜ.kɯ.ɾa]), or Yoshitsune and the Thousand Cherry Trees, is a Japanese play, one of the three most popular and famous in the kabuki repertoire. (Note: The other two are Kanadehon Chūshingura and Sugawara Denju Tenarai Kagami, which were written and premièred in 1746 and 1748 respectively.) Originally written in 1747 for the jōruri puppet theater by Takeda Izumo II, Miyoshi Shōraku and Namiki Senryū I, it was adapted to kabuki the following year. Recent studies of jōruri dramaturgy suggest that Namiki Senryū I (Namiki Sōsuke) played a central role in shaping the structure of the play, particularly in the scenes adapted into later kabuki traditions.

Adapted to kabuki, the play was premièred in that mode in January 1748, in the city of Ise, in Mie Prefecture. Kataoka Nizaemon IV and Yamamoto Koheiji were two of the actors in this performance, playing Ginpei and Tadanobu/Genkurō respectively. The premiere in Edo was held at the Nakamura-za in May the same year, and in Osaka at the Naka no Shibai just a few months later in August.

The play is derived from the world of the Heike Monogatari, a classical epic which details the rise and fall of the Taira clan of samurai. The latter portions describe the eventual defeat of the Taira in the Genpei War (1180–85), at the hands of the Minamoto clan, led by Minamoto no Yoshitsune, the title character of this play.

Yoshitsune takes place a few years after the end of the Genpei War. Minamoto no Yoshitsune, the famous general, is being pursued by agents of his brother, Minamoto no Yoritomo, who has recently established himself as shōgun. Yoshitsune travels with his mistress Shizuka and loyal retainer Benkei in search of three Taira generals who escaped justice at the end of the war, and who he believes may pose a threat to the shogunate. This aspect of the plot is the primary departure from both history and from the epic. In reality, the three generals Taira no Koremori, Taira no Tomomori, and Taira no Noritsune, along with the young Emperor Antoku and his nursemaid who feature in the play, all perished in the war, most of them sacrificing themselves in the Battle of Dan-no-ura.

== Characters ==
- Yoshitsune
- Benkei – Yoshitsune's loyal retainer
- Shizuka – Yoshitsune's mistress (also referred to as Lady Shizuka)
- Genkurō – a kitsune disguised as Yoshitsune's retainer Satō Tadanobu
- Tomomori – Taira general disguised as shopowner Tokaiya Ginpei
- Koremori – Taira general disguised as Yasuke, adopted son of Yazaemon
- Noritsune – Taira general disguised as a priest
- Kawatsura Hōgen – a priest of Yoshino who hides Yoshitsune
- Satō Tadanobu – a retainer of Yoshitsune
- Shitennō (Suruga Jirō, Kamei Rokurō, Kataoka Hachirō, Ise Saburō) – four of Yoshitsune's retainers, generally considered together in drama, in literature and history.
- Oryū – Ginpei's wife, actually Suke no Tsubone, Emperor Antoku's nursemaid
- Oyasu – Ginpei & Oryū's daughter, actually Emperor Antoku
- Wakaba no Naishi – Koremori's wife
- Rokudai – son of Koremori and Naishi
- Kokingo – retainer to Koremori and Naishi
- Yazaemon – sushi-shop owner
- O-bei – Yazaemon's wife
- Gonta – Yazaemon's son
- Ozato – Yazaemon's daughter, Yasuke's betrothed

== Plot ==
The fullest version of Yoshitsune consists of fifteen scenes in five acts. Though this was originally intended to be performed across the better part of a day, modes of performance have changed, and the full version would today take twice that long, due to the style and speed of current forms of acting.

For this reason and others, kabuki plays are almost never performed in their entirety today, and Yoshitsune is no exception. The fullest standard version of any play is called tōshi kyōgen, which in the case of Yoshitsune consists of nine of the full fifteen scenes. However, again as is the case with most plays, individual scenes or elements of Yoshitsune may be performed alone as part of a day's program of other such bits and pieces. The first, second, and fourth scenes of Act One are the most rarely performed today.

The fundamental structure of the play is very much in keeping with that of Japanese traditional drama forms as a whole. The philosophy of jo-ha-kyū is employed throughout, as actions, scenes, acts, and the play as a whole begin slow (jo), then get faster (ha), and end quickly (kyu). Also, Yoshitsune follows the traditional five-act structure and the themes traditionally associated with particular acts. Act One begins calmly and auspiciously, including scenes at the Imperial Palace. Act Two features combat. Act Three is something of a sewamono insertion into the jidaimono tale, turning away from the affairs of warriors and politics to focus on the lives of commoners. Act Four is a michiyuki journey, metaphorically associated with a journey through hell. Act Five wraps up the plot quickly and returns to themes of auspiciousness.

The following plot summary is based on the full fifteen-scene version.

=== Act One ===
The play opens at the Imperial Palace, where Yoshitsune and his faithful retainer, the warrior monk Benkei meet with Fujiwara no Tomokata, a court minister. They discuss the consequences of the Battle of Yashima, (Note: A major and famous battle, conflated here with the later Battle of Dan-no-ura which marked the end of the Genpei War, and in which many of the Taira leaders perished.) and the fact that the bodies of several members of the Taira clan, who were supposed to have died in the battle, have not been found.

Tomokata also presents Yoshitsune with a drum, called "Hatsune", supposedly used several hundred years earlier by the Emperor Kanmu, and thus a precious, rare, and powerful object. The minister describes the symbolism of this imperial gift, explaining that the two drumheads represent Yoshitsune and his brother Yoritomo. The Emperor orders that Yoshitsune strike at his brother, as he would strike the head of the drum.

The following scene introduces Wakaba no Naishi, wife of Taira no Koremori, and her young son Rokudai. The pair are explained to be in hiding in a monastic hermitage near the town of Saga, and enter along with a nun who has been sheltering them in her home. A man comes to the house and is soon revealed to be Kokingo Takesato, a Taira retainer. He explains, to their surprise, that Koremori still lives, and that he has come to escort the pair to be reunited with him. Another man then arrives, this one an agent of the Court, seeking the wanted Naishi and Rokudai. Kokingo, in his disguise as a wandering hat seller, along with the nun, attempts to discourage him and turn him away; though the Imperial agent sees through the ruse, Kokingo strikes the man with a wooden pole and makes his escape, along with his two wards.

Scene three takes place at Yoshitsune's mansion in the capital, where his mistress, Shizuka dances for Yoshitsune's wife Kyō no Kimi and his closest retainers. She expresses her apologies on behalf of Benkei, who made some uncouth and inappropriate remarks to the Imperial agents at the presentation of the drum. Though Benkei is portrayed as cool, collected, eloquent, and quite clever in other plays, in this one he is loud, obnoxious, and violent, leaping to action without thinking. A guard enters and informs the group of an impending attack upon the mansion by forces belonging to Yoritomo, and Benkei immediately leaps to face them, but is held back by Shizuka.

Yoshitsune discusses with Kawagoe Tarō Shigeyori, advisor to his brother Yoritomo, the circumstances surrounding the falling-out which has occurred between him and the shōgun. He explains that he reported to his brother that several Taira generals, actually still at large, had been killed, to help ensure peace and stability for the new shogunate; he also explains that though he has received the Emperor's drum, he has not struck it, and has thus symbolically not acknowledged any intention to attack his brother. This situation resolved, Kawagoe announces that he will call off the attack on Yoshitsune's mansion, but before he is able to do so, the impetuous Benkei has already leapt into action and killed one of the shogunal commanders.

The act ends with Benkei's realization that Yoshitsune and Shizuka have fled. He presumes they have gone to Yoshino, and chases after them.

=== Act Two ===
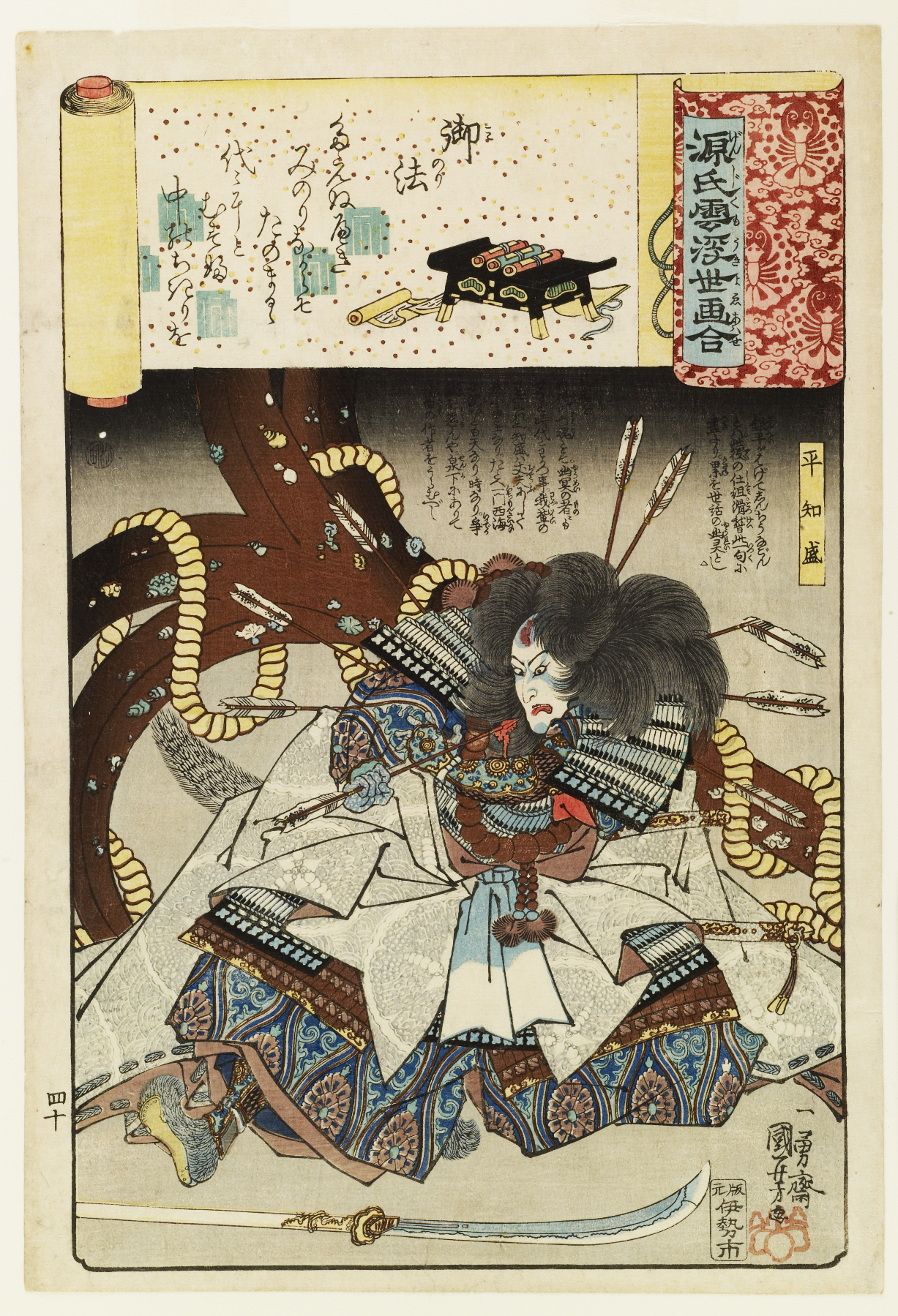
"Genji Unukiyo-e" Utagawa Kuniyoshi painting. Tomomori attacks Yoshitsune and his party, but he is injured when he fights back.

Act two opens at the Fushimi Inari Shrine, where Benkei catches up to Yoshitsune, Shizuka, and the four retainers. The group has fled the capital, seeking to escape retribution for Benkei's careless attack. The monk apologizes, and is forgiven by his lord, at the suggestion of Shizuka. However, Benkei then offers that since their journey will be long and dangerous, a lady such as her should not be subjected to such things and should be escorted back to the capital. She refuses, and in order to prevent her following them, or killing herself in grief, they tie her to a tree, along with the drum Hatsune, and leave her.

She is found by agents of the shōgun, who cuts her free and tries to drag her away. Yoshitsune's retainer Tadanobu suddenly shows up and rescues her, in a flamboyant and vigorous sword fight. He is then commended by his lord, who bestows upon him his own (Yoshitsune's) suit of armor, and his name, Genkurō. (Note: Genkurō (源九郎) is an alternate name for Yoshitsune, meaning roughly "ninth son of Minamoto".) The group then continue on their journey, leaving Tadanobu to escort Shizuka back to the capital.

The second scene takes place at the Tokaiya, a home near Daimotsu Bay where the commoner merchant Ginpei runs a shipping business, living with his wife Oryū and daughter Oyasu. Yoshitsune's party has made their lodgings here while they wait for good weather to continue their journey by boat. While talking to Oryū, Benkei steps over the sleeping Oyasu as he makes his way from the room; just at that moment, accompanied by dramatic drumming, he feels a pain in his leg.

Shortly after Benkei leaves, Sagami Gorō, a retainer of the shogunate, sent here to seek out and attack Yoshitsune, arrives. Not knowing that Yoshitsune is in that very home, Sagami demands of Oryū that he be provided a boat in order to pursue his quarry. She replies that their only boat is already promised to their other guests, and a small scuffle occurs between the two as the warrior accuses the woman of harboring Taira fugitives and seeks to enter the room where Yoshitsune and his retainers remain. Just then, the merchant Ginpei makes his first entrance, carrying an anchor over his shoulder, a strong symbolic reference to his true identity as the fugitive general Taira no Tomomori. He argues briefly with Sagami, and throws the warrior out of his house.

Ginpei is then introduced to his guests, who were taken in by Oryū while he was out, and immediately recognizes Yoshitsune. Introducing himself briefly, and expounding on his identity as a boatman and merchant, he then suggests that they set sail, despite the weather. As Yoshitsune and his retainers dress and prepare for the journey, Ginpei has an aside in which he dramatically reveals himself to the audience as the Taira general Tomomori. (Note: This monologue, his costume, and the events of the remainder of the act pay homage to, and draw faithfully from, the Noh play Funa Benkei, a short play which covers much the same events. One of the chief differences between the two plays is that in Funa Benkei, Yoshitsune faces the ghost of Tomomori; the living Tomomori in Senbon Zakura wears the white costume of a ghost, recalling the conventions of the other play.)

Tomomori declares to the audience the story of faking his own death at Dan-no-ura and escaping with the young Emperor Antoku and his wet nurse Tsubone, living for the last several years as Ginpei, his daughter Oyasu and wife Oryū. He explains to Tsubone that he intends to kill Yoshitsune while out at sea, the rain and dark of night obscuring the battle. He heads out to the boat, as Tsubone and the Emperor change clothes, removing their disguises.

The battle is not seen on stage, but reflected through narration, the reactions of Tsubone, as she watches from the shore, and the report of Sagami Gorō, the shogunal officer who is revealed to have actually been in Tomomori's service. After some time, the clash is perceived to have ended with Tomomori's death. Tsubone takes the Emperor to the seashore, and prepares to have them both drown, sacrificing themselves. But they are pulled back by Yoshitsune as he returns to the shore, and assured of their safety; he has no intentions of capturing or killing the Emperor of Japan. Tomomori, not killed, returns just a few moments after Yoshitsune, and is appalled that his schemes have fallen apart so quickly and easily.

Tsubone kills herself, seeing that she cannot serve Tomomori any longer, and the general, recognizing the futility of his schemes, his failure to slay his enemies, and the doom wrought upon his entire clan by the evil actions of his father Taira no Kiyomori, throws himself into the sea, tied to an anchor.

=== Act Three ===
Act Three opens as Wakaba no Naishi, her retainer Kokingo and son Rokudai pause at a tea shop along their journey to find her husband, Taira no Koremori. They sit down to rest, and a young man in traveling clothes, by the name of Gonta, joins them soon afterwards. He talks to them briefly, helps them get nuts from the tree, and then leaves, taking Kokingo's travelling pack instead of his own. Kokingo notices a few moments later, and Gonta returns, apologizing for his mistake. The two go through the contents of the baskets, to make sure the other hasn't stolen anything, but Gonta then claims that there's twenty ryō missing from his basket.

Gonta, attempting to swindle the samurai, accuses him of being a thief, and a battle very nearly breaks out. Though aggressive with words, he is no match for the samurai in a fight, and hides behind a bench while Kokingo only grows more angry and brandishes his sword. Naishi attempts to calm him down, but Gonta only eggs him on until, finally, the samurai pays him twenty ryō and leaves, along with Naishi and Rokudai.

Gonta is thus left alone with Kosen, the proprietess of the teahouse, who it turns out is his wife. She scolds him for being a swindler and a gambler; in his response, he explains his life story. The son of Yazaemon of the Tsurube sushi shop, he became a swindler, thief and gambler in order to support himself and his love for Kosen. Disowned and kicked out of his house, he struggled to earn money to buy Kosen out of indenture. Though he describes his intent to rob his mother that night, he is talked out of it by Kosen, and they return home.

The next scene focuses on Kokingo, Rokudai and Naishi, pursued by Imperial officers. Already wounded, Kokingo fights off one of the officers, Inokuma Dainoshin, and then sinks to the ground, exhausted. As Naishi weeps over him, he claims he cannot go on, and implores Naishi and her son to forget about him, and to continue on to see Koremori. He promises to follow them after he regains his strength. The pair leave him then, and exit, continuing on their journey. The warrior then dies, just as a group of townsmen, including the sushi shop owner Yazaemon, come upon him. After saying a prayer for the dead, Yazaemon cuts off Kokingo's head and takes it with him, returning home.

Yazaemon's sushi shop is the setting for the third scene, which opens with his daughter Osato and his wife preparing and selling sushi to visitors while they talk. A young man named Yasuke has been living with them for some time, and is due to be married to Osato as soon as Yazaemon returns. Yasuke enters with some sushi tubs, and talks briefly with the two women as they work, before they are interrupted by the arrival of Gonta, Osato's brother.

Gonta explains to his mother that he is leaving for good, to turn himself around and make something of his life, but asks for some money, claiming that he was robbed on the road on his way there. She places several silver kanme coins in a sushi tub for him and sends him off. Just then, Yazaemon returns; fearing that he should learn that his wife stole from the shop to give to Gonta, they hide the sushi tub among the others. Yazaemon then comes in, calls out for his family, and hides the head of Kokingo, wrapped in his cloak, in one of the other tubs.

Meeting up with Yasuke, Yazaemon then reveals to the audience Yasuke's identity as the general Taira no Koremori, father of Rokudai and husband of Naishi, who he came across in Kumano and took into his home. He explains to Koremori that he just came across Kajiwara Kagetoki, an agent of the shogunate, who suspected him of harboring the general, and that for his safety he might flee the area.

As Osato and Yasuke (Koremori) lie on their wedding bed, preparing to consummate their relationship, he confesses to her not his true identity, but that he has a wife and child in another province, and asks that she release him from his pledge to marry her. By coincidence, the wandering Wakaba no Naishi then arrives at that same house, seeking lodging for the night. Koremori glances outside, realizes who they are, and welcomes them in. He attempts to explain his infidelity to his wife, his romance with Osato coming from a desire to repay Yazaemon for taking him in; Osato overhears, and bursts into sobs. She welcomes Rokudai and Naishi into her home, offering them the seats of honor, and explains her side of the story, asking for forgiveness from Naishi. She fell in love with this gentle man, she explains, whom her father brought home, not knowing that he was secretly a noble. Upset at Koremori's duplicity and at his leaving her, she weeps and is comforted by Naishi.

Word comes of the arrival of shogunal officers, and Koremori, his wife and child exit. Gonta arrives, then, declaring to Osato that he intends to turn over the three to the authorities in exchange for a reward. His sister begs him not to, and he grabs the sushi tub with the silver coins and flees after the three.

Soldiers then appear, along with Kajiwara, and surround Yazaemon. They accuse him of lying to them, and harboring Koremori; but thinking quickly, he tells them that he's already had a change of heart and killed Koremori himself. He brings the men inside, and reaches for the sushi tub with Kokingo's head in it, but is stopped by his wife, who is thinking of the money she stole from him to give to Gonta. A shout is heard from outside, as Gonta returns with a woman and child, tied up and being dragged behind him. He explains to the soldiers that he has captured Rokudai and Naishi, and shows them the tub containing Kokingo's head, claiming it to be Koremori's. Kajiwara offers to spare Yazaemon's life in exchange for this deed, but Gonta, hoping to gain from this himself, declares that he wants monetary compensation; Kajiwara therefore gives him his cloak, which previously belonged to Yoritomo, and which would be symbolic of the reward owed him by the government.

As Kajiwara leads the prisoners away, Yazaemon finds the opportunity to viciously stab his son, bitter at Gonta's betrayal. Yazaemon curses his son as he aggravates the wound, but as he dies, Gonta explains to his father that his deceptions were for good intentions all along. He claims that he intended to give the silver to Koremori for traveling expenses. Knowing that his father intended to play off Kokingo's head as Koremori's, and knowing that the head was no longer in the house, he returned in order to rescue his father's plan, and his family therefore. He then reveals that the woman and child turned over were not Naishi and Rokudai but his own wife and child, Kosen and Zenta, who willingly and voluntarily sacrificed themselves to save the nobles.

Koremori, Naishi, and Rokudai then return, alive and safe, disguised as tea merchants. Koremori finds a poem on Yoritomo's cloak which indicates that something is inside it; cutting it open, he finds a Buddhist monk's robe. Seemingly, Kajiwara intended all along to spare Koremori, and granted him in this indirect way a disguise with which to safely escape.

Koremori cuts off his topknot, becomes a lay monk, and separates himself from both his families for the final time. Yazaemon offers to accompany Rokudai and Naishi, and Osato stays with her mother, loyally maintaining the home and the shop in her father's absence.

The act ends with Gonta's death, one of the most famous examples in Japanese traditional drama of the interference of the affairs of nobles and samurai into the lives of common people, and the death and destruction it brings.

=== Act Four ===
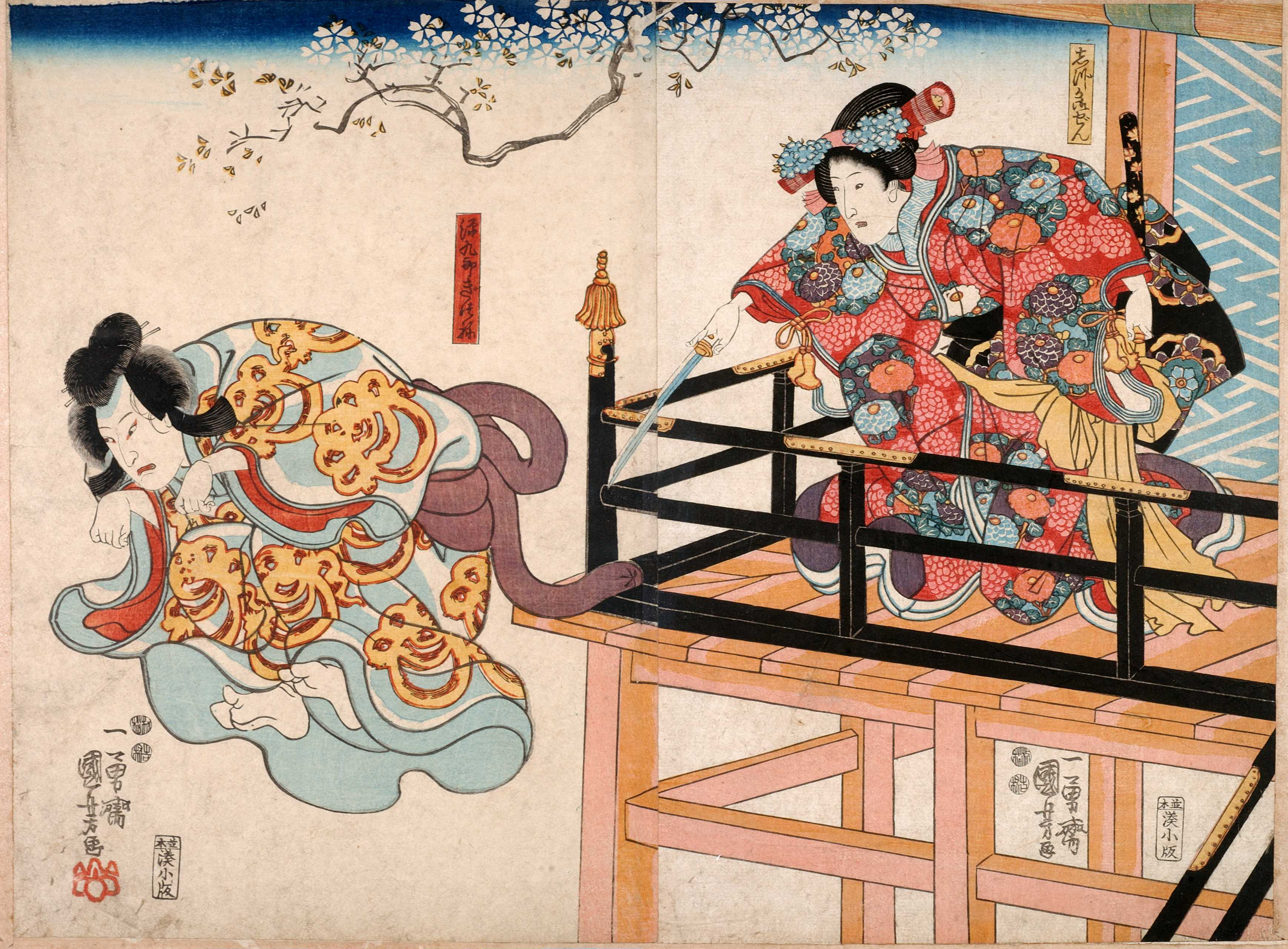
A scene (act 4) from the kabuki play 'Yoshitsune senbon zakura' performed at the Kawarasaki theatre in the autumn of 1847.

The fourth act begins with a michiyuki dance scene, which follows Shizuka as she seeks to catch up with Yoshitsune and his party. The journey is narrated by an offstage narrator, in the bunraku style, and there is very little dialogue.

As she travels through the countryside, Shizuka decides to play the Hatsune Drum, in order to entice birds to follow her, not knowing the magical or metaphorical significance of the drum. As soon as she does so, a white fox emerges, romps across the stage and then disappears behind a low hill, from which emerges Tadanobu.

Placing the drum atop Yoshitsune's armor, granted Tadanobu in the second act, the two dance, their gestures and motions mimicking the actions of the narration. The narration indicates their desire to follow Yoshitsune to Yoshino, and then drifts into a retelling of the events of the battle of Dan-no-ura, ending with the pair's arrival at a Buddhist temple, the Zaō Hall in Yoshino.

After a very brief scene showing the pair's arrival, attention is shifted to Kawatsura Hōgen, head of the temple, who discusses with his fellow monks what stance they should take towards Yoshitsune. Several of the monks here are known to be enemies of Yoshitsune, and a letter has just arrived from the capital asking them to hunt him down. The monks discuss, and even those normally hostile to Yoshitsune decide that as monks it is their duty to aid people in need. Hōgen, however, even after admitting that he thinks Yoshitsune blameless, fires an arrow at a distant peak, smaller than its neighboring peak, and thus representing the younger brother (Yoshitsune). Thus he declares his stance alongside the shogunate, for the safety of the temple.

Hōgen encourages his monks to do what they think is right: to welcome Yoshitsune in and grant him asylum if he should arrive and request it. But he also assures them that he intends to kill the warrior should they do so. The monks interpret their master's words to mean that he is already harboring Yoshitsune, and that he intended to throw them off and prevent their interference; they decide to find and attack the warrior that night.

Hōgen returns to his mansion, where he is indeed harboring Yoshitsune, and declares to his wife that he has turned against his guest, and intends to stand with the shogunate. Yoshitsune speaks briefly with Hōgen, thanking him for his hospitality and aid, and is then informed that his retainer, Satō Tadanobu has arrived and wishes to speak with him. Tadanobu is asked by his lord about his stewardship of Shizuka and replies, confused, that he has been in his home province with his ailing mother since the end of the war, and has not seen Shizuka. Two of Yoshitsune's other retainers appear, pointing swords at Tadanobu and demanding an explanation when the temple's gatekeeper announces that Satō Tadanobu has arrived with Lady Shizuka.

Shizuka is reunited with her lord, but the Tadanobu who had been escorting her seems to vanish. The first Tadanobu explains to Shizuka that he has not been escorting her and has not seen her in some time; the other retainers confirm that this second Tadanobu is nowhere to be found in the building. She then notices that this Tadanobu is wearing somewhat different clothing, and comes upon the idea of beating the Hatsune Drum to summon her escort. She explains that the drum always attracted her escort, and made him behave strangely. The scene ends as she bangs the drum, and Tadanobu is taken away by Yoshitsune's retainers.

The final scene thus begins with Shizuka beating the drum, and a fox rushes into the room, becoming Tadanobu, who bows before her. Shizuka then suddenly pulls a sword and slashes at Tadanobu, who dodges the attack. Mesmerized by the drum, Tadanobu still manages to avoid continued attacks as Shizuka demands that he reveal his identity.

He then tells his story, revealing in the process that he is a kitsune, a fox spirit. The drum was made hundreds of years earlier from the skins of his parents, powerful kitsune whose magic was employed to bring rain. A costume quick-change transforms Tadanobu into his kitsune form, who explains that though he has lived a very long time and gained magical powers, he has been unable to ever care for his parents. Failing to fulfill acts of filial piety prevents him from gaining respect or status among the kitsune, and so for centuries he has sought out this drum. He was unable to get at the drum when it was kept in the imperial palace, he explains, since the palace is guarded against spirits by many gods (kami), but once it was removed from the palace and given to Yoshitsune, he saw his chance.

Shizuka and Yoshitsune speak to the fox for a time, and decide to grant him the drum. Thus released, he exits in grand style. Originally this would have been done through a particular style of dance called kitsune roppo (fox six-steps) along the hanamichi (the pathway that cuts through the audience from stage to the rear of the theatre). However, more recently it has become the practice, encouraged by Ichikawa Ennosuke III who often plays the fox Genkurō to exit by flying out over the audience, in a technique known as chūnori (riding the sky).

The real Tadanobu then offers to take his lord's place in facing the doom that awaits him at the hands of the monks. The kitsune's magic hampers the monk's schemes, and Kakuhan, the one monk who most strongly opposed the samurai lord, is revealed to be Taira no Noritsune, the third surviving Taira general, in disguise. Noritsune and Yoshitsune clash swords several times before Emperor Antoku appears from the next room. Noritsune, of course, bows low to his Emperor, and both explain how they survived their supposed deaths at the battle of Yashima, and came to be at this monastery. Noritsune then begins weeping, announcing his failure to his clan and to his Emperor.

Hōgen and two of Yoshitsune's retainers come in with bloody blades and holding the severed heads of the other monks who followed Noritsune. They seek to fight, but their hearts are calmed by the fox's magic, and Noritsune announces that he shall once again become Yokawa no Kakuhan, a loyal servant to the Emperor.

=== Act Five ===
As is quite standard for Japanese traditional dramas, the final act is short, swift, and serves to wrap up any major loose plot threads. Here, it opens on a mountaintop, with Tadanobu, dressed as Yoshitsune, calling out a challenge to those who side with Yoritomo and the shogunate.

A number of warriors come at him, and he cuts them down. Noritsune then appears, as the monk Kakuhan, who claims to have foregone all his old grudges, and his warrior ways. Tadanobu declares his true identity to his foe, and the two clash in a complex choreographed fight scene. Finally, Noritsune pins his opponent to the ground, but a second Tadanobu rushes in and stabs the Taira general, the body below him disappearing and leaving only a suit of armor. Yoshitsune explains that they saw through Noritsune's promises of peace, and the fox Genkurō aided them in subduing him.

Kawagoe, an agent of the shogunate, then appears, along with Fujiwara no Tomokata, who he has tied up. He reveals that the Imperial order which came with the drum, ordering Yoshitsune to oppose his brother, along with that to exterminate the Taira clan, came not from the Emperor, but from the machinations of Tomokata. Hearing this, Noritsune kills the defenseless Tomokata, and then turns to Yoshitsune, challenging his foe to kill him. Yoshitsune states that Noritsune died long ago, that he has since become Kakuhan, and that it is to Tadanobu to kill him.

The play thus ends with the last of Yoshitsune's foes slain, and a return to the peace and auspiciousness with which the play began.
