= Namiki Sōsuke =

Namiki Sōsuke 並木宗輔
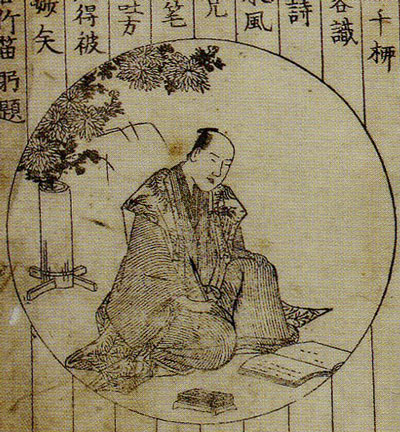
- Portrait of Namiki Sōsuke
- Born: 1695; Osaka, Japan
- Died: c. 1751; Japan
- Occupations: Kabuki and bunraku playwright
- Writing career
- Period: Edo
- Genre: jidaimono

Namiki Sōsuke (Japanese: 並木宗輔; 1695 – c. 1751), also known by his pen name of Namiki Senryū, was a prominent Japanese playwright who wrote for both kabuki and bunraku (puppet theater). He produced around 47 bunraku plays, nearly 40 of them composed for jōruri, a particular form of musical narrative, and 10 kabuki plays. He is considered the second greatest Japanese playwright after Chikamatsu Monzaemon. His dramaturgy is distinctive for its tightly constructed plotting and its psychologically detailed tragic scenes.

Sōsuke was born in Osaka in 1695 and for the early part of his life he was a buddhist monk of the Zen Rinzai school in the Jōjūji temple in Mihara, Bingo province. He then left the priesthood and settled in Osaka to become a playwright, starting as a disciple of Nishizawa Ippū in the Toyotake-za theatre.

After joining the Toyotake-za in the Dōtonbori theatre district of Osaka in 1725, he wrote or co-wrote some 29 jōruri plays for this theatre until his departure in 1742. He was most probably the lead author of this group of plays. Several works from this period include nazo-toki (enigma-solving) episodes integrated into tightly focused, tragic scenes. They have been noted in later scholarship for their direct, unsentimental tone, and explorations of the dark side of human psychology. These early plays contrast with the more humanistic and uplifting jōruri style favoured by his contemporaries at the rival Takemoto-za, now in its post-Chikamatsu period, and show Sōsuke's engagement with narrative techniques that he would later employ in his own Takemoto-za successes. Nearly all of these plays are absent from the modern Bunraku repertoire.

After a short period writing for kabuki theatres from 1742, Sōsuke started writing jōruri plays for the Takemoto-za, his former theatre's rival, in 1745. Collaborating with a number of other playwrights, including Takeda Izumo I, Takeda Izumo II and Miyoshi Shōraku, Namiki Sōsuke created some of the most famous traditional Japanese plays under the pen-name of Namiki Senryū. Among them are Natsu Matsuri Naniwa Kagami (1745, Summer Festival: Mirror of Osaka), Sugawara denju tenarai kagami (1746, The Secrets of Sugawara's Calligraphy), Yoshitsune no senbonzakura (1747, The Thousand Cherry Blossoms of Yoshitsune), and Kanadehon chūshingura (1748, The Treasure of the Loyal Retainers).

A distinctive example of Sōsuke's authorship appears in the printed text of Genpei Nunobiki no Taki (1749), written for the Takemoto-za. In the closing lines, the benediction contains subtle acrostic illusions to the names of Namiki Senryū/Sōsuke ("willow with a thousand branches") and Miyoshi Shōraku ("capital of the pines"), but not to Takeda Izumo II, who was listed in the printed libretto as the work's main author. Uchiyama Mikiko has suggested that this omission reflects Sōsuke's dissatisfaction with the attribution practices then current at the Takemoto-za.

In 1751, Namiki returned to his first theatre, the Toyotake-za. He died while writing Ichinotani futaba gunki (1751, The Chronicle of the Battle of Ichi-no-Tani), but it was completed by some of his collaborators.

One of his plays has been translated into English, Summer Festival: Mirror of Osaka (1745, translated by Julie A. Iezzi) in Kabuki Plays on Stage I: Brilliance and Bravado, 1697–1770, edited by James R. Brandon and Samuel L. Leiter.

Scholarly reassessment in recent decades has further strengthened Sōsuke’s position within the canon of jōruri. Studies by Uchiyama Mikiko have shown that he was effectively the principal playwright for all three of the so-called three masterpieces of Japanese puppet theatre—Kanadehon Chūshingura (1748), Yoshitsune Senbonzakura (1747), and Sugawara Denju Tenarai Kagami (1746)—works long attributed primarily to Takeda Izumo II for institutional and contractual reasons rather than authorship.

== Plays ==
(The following list is only a selection of Namiki Sōsuke's most famous works.)

- Izutsuya Genroku Koi no Kanzarashi (1723) with others, bunraku
- Hōjō Jiraiki (1726) with Nishizawa Ippū, bunraku
- Karukaya Dōshin Tsukushi no Iezuto (1735) with Namiki Jōsuke, bunraku
- Wada Gassen Onna Maizuru (1736) bunraku
- Kama-ga-Fuchi Futatsu Domoe (1737) bunraku
- Hibariyama Himesute Matsu (1740) bunraku
- Futatsu Biki Nishiki no Manmaku (1743) with Namiki Eisuke I, kabuki
- Natsu Matsuri Naniwa Kagami (Summer Festival: Mirror of Osaka, 1745) with Miyoshi Shōraku and Takeda Koizumo I, bunraku. Adapted to kabuki the same year
- Sugawara Denju Tenarai Kagami (1746) with Takeda Izumo I, Takeda Izumo II, Miyoshi Shōraku and Takeda Koizumo I, bunraku. Adapted to kabuki the same year
- Yoshitsune Senbon Zakura (1747) with Takeda Izumo II and Miyoshi Shōraku, bunraku. Adapted to kabuki the next year
- Kanadehon Chūshingura (1748) with Takeda Izumo II and Miyoshi Shōraku, bunraku. Adapted to kabuki the same year
- Futatsu Chōchō Kuruwa Nikki (1749) with Takeda Izumo II and Miyoshi Shōraku, bunraku
- Genpei Nunobiki no Taki (1749) with Miyoshi Shōraku, bunraku
- Ichi-no-Tani Futaba Gunki (1751) with Asada Icchō, Namioka Geiji, Namiki Shōzō I, Naniwa Sanzō and Toyotake Jinroku, bunraku
