= Naka no Shibai =

- 中の芝居
- Naka-za
- Address: Osaka; Japan
- Owner: Shōchiku (from 1920)
- Capacity: c. 800 (pre-1945); 1200 (post-1948)
- Type: Kabuki theatre

Construction
- Opened: 1652
- Closed: 1999
- Rebuilt: 1884, 1934, 1948

Naka no Shibai (中の芝居, Central Theatre), also known as Naka-za (中座), was one of the major kabuki theatres in Osaka, Japan.

== History ==
It was first built in 1652, in Osaka's Dōtonbori entertainment district, and saw the premieres of many famous plays; closely related to the nearby jōruri theatres, Naka would often be the first to adapt puppet plays to the kabuki stage, and often also arranged the Kamigata (Kansai) premieres of plays earlier performed in Edo. Also tied closely to other theatres in the area, and the general theatre culture and community of Kamigata, Naka hosted a number of competitions between actors and troupes, as well as reconciliation ceremonies between actors who had been feuding, and a variety of other theatrical community events.

Some of the plays premiered at the Naka no Shibai include Natsu Matsuri Naniwa Kagami (1745), Yoshitsune Senbon Zakura (Aug. 1748), and Kanadehon Chūshingura (Dec. 1748) which was first performed as a puppet play six months earlier. Ichi-no-Tani Futaba Gunki was first performed in Osaka, at the Naka no Shibai, in 1752, as was Meiboku Sendai Hagi in 1777.

Destroyed by fire twice in the Meiji period (1868-1912), the theatre was rebuilt almost immediately in both instances, and saw the installation of electricity when rebuilt in 1884. In 1920, the theatre was bought by production company Shōchiku, and renamed Naka-za. In November 1927, during a performance of Honzō Shimoyashiki, actor Nakamura Jakuemon II collapsed and died on stage.

Destroyed and rebuilt in 1934, the Naka-za became the most major theatre in the city, surpassing the Naniwa-za, but was destroyed along with most of the rest of the city in the 1945 Allied bombing of Osaka in World War II.

The Naka-za was rebuilt once more, and reopened in 1948. Holding around 800 seats through most of its incarnations, this newest building held 1200. The theater was closed in 1999, however, by Shōchiku, on account of financial problems and the effects of the overall worsening Japanese economy. The final kabuki performance at the Naka-za was Natsu Sugata Naniwa Goyomi, featuring Kataoka Hidetarō II, Arashi Tokusaburō VII, Bandō Takesaburō V, Kataoka Ainosuke VI and Kamimura Kichiya VI. Though the theatre was not intentionally destroyed at that time, a gas explosion and the resulting fire in September 2002 burnt it to the ground. An office building now stands in its place.
