= Diedorf (disambiguation) =

Diedorf is a municipality in the district of Augsburg, in Bavaria, Germany.

Diedorf may also refer to:

- Diedorf, Thuringia, a municipality in the Wartburgkreis district, in Thuringia, Germany

== See also ==
- Die Dorfschule, a 1918 German opera by Felix Weingartner
- Diesdorf, a municipality in Saxony-Anhalt, Germany
- Dierdorf, a municipality in Rhineland-Palatinate, Germany
- Driedorf, a community in Hesse, Germany
