= Jo-ha-kyū =

Japanese concept of modulation

Jo-ha-kyū (序破急) is a concept of modulation and movement applied in a wide variety of traditional Japanese arts. Roughly translated to "beginning, break, rapid", it essentially means that all actions or efforts should begin slowly, speed up, and then end swiftly. This concept is applied to elements of the Japanese tea ceremony, martial arts (kenjutsu, iaido, kendō, karate), dramatic structure in the traditional theatre, and to the traditional collaborative linked verse forms renga and renku (haikai no renga).

The concept originated in gagaku court music, specifically in the ways in which elements of the music could be distinguished and described. Though eventually incorporated into a number of disciplines, it was most famously adapted, and thoroughly analysed and discussed by the great Noh playwright Zeami, who viewed it as a universal concept applying to the patterns of movement of all things.

== Theatre ==
It is perhaps in the theatre that jo-ha-kyū is used the most extensively, on the most levels. Following the writings of Zeami, all major forms of Japanese traditional drama (Noh, kabuki, and jōruri) utilize the concept of jo-ha-kyū, from the choice and arrangement of plays across a day, to the composition and pacing of acts within a play, down to the individual actions of the actors.

Zeami, in his work "Sandō" (The Three Paths), originally described a five-part (five dan) Noh play as the ideal form. It begins slowly and auspiciously in the first part (jo), building up the drama and tension in the second, third, and fourth parts (ha), with the greatest climax in the third dan, and rapidly concluding with a return to peace and auspiciousness in the fifth dan (kyū).

This same concept was later adapted into jōruri and kabuki, where the plays are often arranged into five acts with jo-ha-kyū in mind. Takemoto Gidayū, the great jōruri chanter, was the first to describe the patterns or logic behind the five acts, which parallel as well the five categories of Noh which would be performed across a day.

He described the first act as "Love"; the play opens auspiciously, using gentle themes and pleasant music to draw in the attention of the audience. The second act is described as "Warriors and Battles" (shura). Though it need not contain actual battle, it is generally typified by heightened tempo and intensity of plot. The third act, the climax of the entire play, is typified by pathos and tragedy. The plot achieves its dramatic climax. Takemoto describes the fourth act as a michiyuki (journey), which eases out of the intense drama of the climactic act, and often consists primarily of song and dance rather than dialogue and plot. The fifth act, then, is a rapid conclusion. All loose ends are tied up, and the play returns to an auspicious setting.

== Poetry ==
In 1356, it was Nijō Yoshimoto who established the sequential pattern of renga, haikai and noh by requiring jo-ha-kyū for renga in his Tsukubashū (菟玖波集)

== See also ==
- Dramatic structure
- Kishōtenketsu, contrasting 4-part structure
- Shuhari
- Three-act structure
- Yonkoma
