= Takemoto-za =

- 竹本座
- Interactive map of Takemoto-za
- Address: Osaka; Japan
- Type: Bunraku theatre

Construction
- Opened: 1684
- Closed: 1767

The Takemoto-za (竹本座) was a bunraku theatre in Osaka, founded in 1684 by Takemoto Gidayū. Plays by many famous playwrights were performed there, including works by Chikamatsu Monzaemon, Namiki Sōsuke, and Takeda Izumo I. Many of the playwrights working at the Takemoto-za worked together, as a committee, as was the custom at the time.

The Takemoto-za had a fierce rival in the Toyotake-za, built by one of Takemoto Gidayū's former disciples.

Among the playwrights who shaped the theatre's aesthetic during its Golden Age of the 1740s was Namiki Senryū I (Namiki Sōsuke). His tightly constructed tragedies and innovative narrative techniques influenced several major works in the Takemoto-za repertoire. Recent scholarship suggests that he played the lead authorial role in the creation of the "Three Masterpieces" of Bunraku: Sugawara Denju Tenarai Kagami (1746), Yoshitsune Senbon Zakura (1747) and Kanadehon Chūshingura (1748), three great successes written in consecutive years. All three works were later adapted for the kabuki theatre and became staples of its repertoire.

Though bunraku remained exceptionally popular through 1764, at that time it began to be eclipsed by kabuki and to fall into decline. The Takemoto-za was forced to close in 1767, and though it opened once more after that, it soon afterwards closed again.
