= Chūshingura =

Fictionalized accounts of the forty-seven rōnin

Chūshingura (忠臣蔵; Japanese pronunciation: [tɕɯː.ɕiŋ.ɡɯ.ɾa, -ŋɯ.ɾa], lit. 'The Treasury of Loyal Retainers') is the title given to fictionalized accounts in Japanese literature, theater, and film that relate to the historical incident involving the forty-seven rōnin and their mission to avenge the death of their master, Asano Naganori. Including the early Kanadehon Chūshingura (仮名手本忠臣蔵), the story has been told in kabuki, bunraku, stage plays, films, novels, television shows and other media. With ten different television productions in the years 1997–2007 alone, Chūshingura ranks among the most familiar of all historical stories in Japan.

== Historical events ==
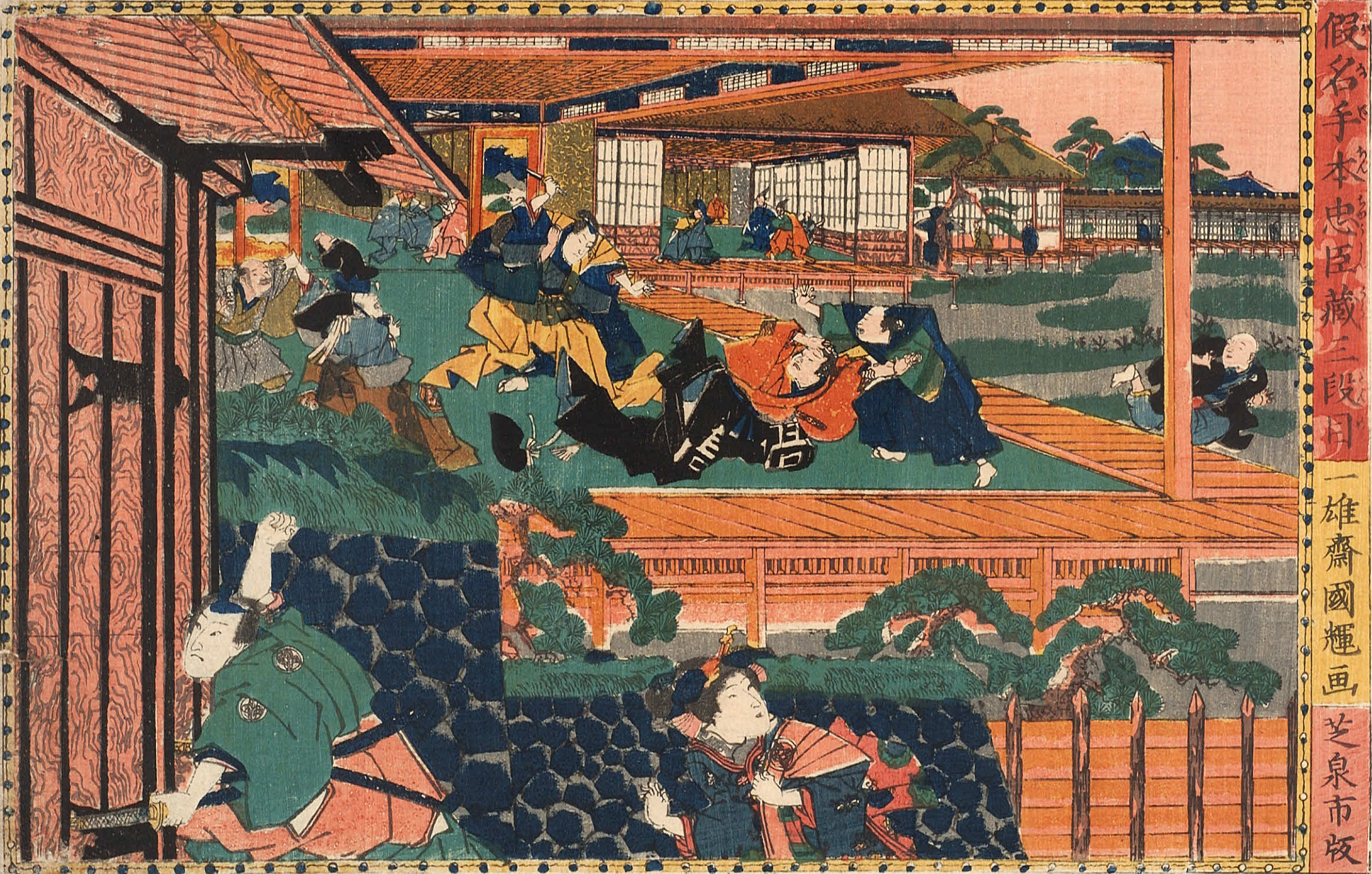
Ukiyo-e print by Utagawa Kuniteru depicting the assault of Asano Naganori on Kira Yoshinaka in the Matsu no Ōrōka of Edo Castle in 1701, an incident that triggered the tragedy of the Forty-seven rōnin

The historical basis for the narrative began in 1701. The ruling shōgun Tokugawa Tsunayoshi placed Asano Takumi-no-kami Naganori, the daimyō of Akō, in charge of a reception of envoys from the Imperial Court in Kyoto. He also appointed the protocol official (kōke) Kira Kōzuke-no-suke Yoshinaka to instruct Asano in the ceremonies. On the day of the reception, at Edo Castle, Asano drew his short sword and attempted to kill Kira. His reasons are not known, but many have suggested that an insult may have provoked him. For this act, he was sentenced to commit seppuku, but Kira did not receive any punishment. The shogunate confiscated Asano's lands (the Akō Domain) and dismissed the samurai who had served him, making them rōnin.

Nearly two years later, Ōishi Kuranosuke Yoshio, who had been a high-ranking samurai in the service of Asano, led a group of forty-six/forty-seven of the rōnin (some discount the membership of one for various reasons). They broke into Kira's mansion in Edo, captured and killed Kira, and laid his head at the grave of Asano at Sengaku-ji. They then turned themselves in to the authorities, and were sentenced to commit seppuku, which they all did on the same day that year. Ōishi is the protagonist in most retellings of the fictionalized form of what became known as the Akō incident, or, in its fictionalized form, the Treasury of Loyal Retainers (Chūshingura).

In 1822, the earliest known account of the Akō incident in the West was published in Isaac Titsingh's posthumous book Illustrations of Japan.

== Religious significance ==
In the story of the 47 rōnin, the concept of chūshin gishi is another interpretation taken by some. Chūshin gishi is usually translated as "loyal and dutiful samurai". However, as John Allen Tucker points out that definition glosses over the religious meaning behind the term. Scholars during that time used that word to describe people who had given their lives for a greater cause in such a way that they deserved veneration after death. Such people were often entombed or memorialized at shrines.

However, there is a debate on whether they even should be worshiped and how controversial their tombs at Sengakuji are. Tucker raises a point in his article that the rōnin were condemned as rōnin, which was not an honorable state, but in the end their resting places are now honored. In other words, it is as if those that regarded the rōnin as chūshin gishi were questioning the decision of the Bakufu (the shogunate, the authorities who declared them rōnin), and perhaps even implying that the Bakufu had made a mistake. Those recognizing the rōnin as chūshin gishi were really focusing on the basics of samurai code where loyalty to your master is the ultimate and most sacred obligation.

In Chinese philosophy, Confucius used to say that the great ministers served their rulers the moral way. Early Confucianism emphasized loyalty, the moral way and objection and legitimate execution of wrongdoers. Chūshin gishi is interpreted as almost a blind loyalty to your master. In the Book of Rites, something similar to chūshin gishi is mentioned which is called zhongchen yishi. Interpretations of the passage from the Book identified those who would sacrifice themselves in the name of duty should live on idealized. However, there were also those such as Ogyū Sorai, that agreed on condemnation of the rōnin as criminals. Sorai, Satō Naokata, and Dazai Shundai were some of those who believed that the rōnin were merely criminals and murderers with no sense of righteousness, since they did violate the law by killing Kira Yoshinaka. So definitely there was controversy revolving around the legitimacy of the rōnins' actions.

Confucianism and the deification of the rōnins collision is something that is very important to the way to understanding Bakufu law. Confucian classics and the Bakufu law may have seemed to complement each other to allow revenge. Hayashi Hōkō claims that the idolization of the rōnin may have been allowed because their actions matched with the Chinese loyalists. Also suggesting that only by killing themselves would they be able to claim their title as chūshin gishi. Hokō summarized that there might have been a correlation between the law and the lessons put forth in Confucian classics.

Actually during the seventeenth century there was a system of registered vendettas. This meant that people could avenge a murder of a relative, but only after their plans strictly adhered to legal guidelines. However, the Akō vendetta did not adhere to this legalized system. Thus, they had to look to Confucian texts to justify their vendetta. Chūshin gishi is something that cannot be looked on lightly in regards to this story because it is the main idea in this story. Loyalty and duty to one's master as a retainer is everything in the story of the 47 rōnin.

Being able to draw Confucianist values from this story is no coincidence, it is said that Asano was a Confucian. So it would only seem natural that his retainers would practice the same thing. Their ultimate sacrifice for their master is something that is held in high regard in Confucianism because they are fulfilling their responsibility to the fullest extent. There is nothing more after that kind of sacrifice. At that point the warriors have given their everything to their master. That type of devotion is hard to contest as something other than being a chūshin gishi.

== Bunraku ==
The puppet play based on these events was entitled Kanadehon Chūshingura and written by Takeda Izumo II (1691–1756), Miyoshi Shōraku (c. 1696 – 1772) and Namiki Senryū (1695 – c. 1751). It was first performed in August 1748 at the Takemoto-za theater in the Dōtonbori entertainment district in Osaka, and an almost identical kabuki adaptation appeared later that year. The title means "Kana practice book Treasury of the loyal retainers". The "kana practice book" aspect refers to the coincidence that the number of rōnin matches the number of kana, and the play portrayed the rōnin as each prominently displaying one kana to identify him. The forty-seven rōnin were the loyal retainers of Asano; the title likened them to a warehouse full of treasure. To avoid censorship, the authors placed the action in the time of the Taiheiki (a few centuries earlier), changing the names of the principals. The play is performed every year in both the bunraku and kabuki versions, though more often than not it is only a few selected acts which are performed and not the entire work.

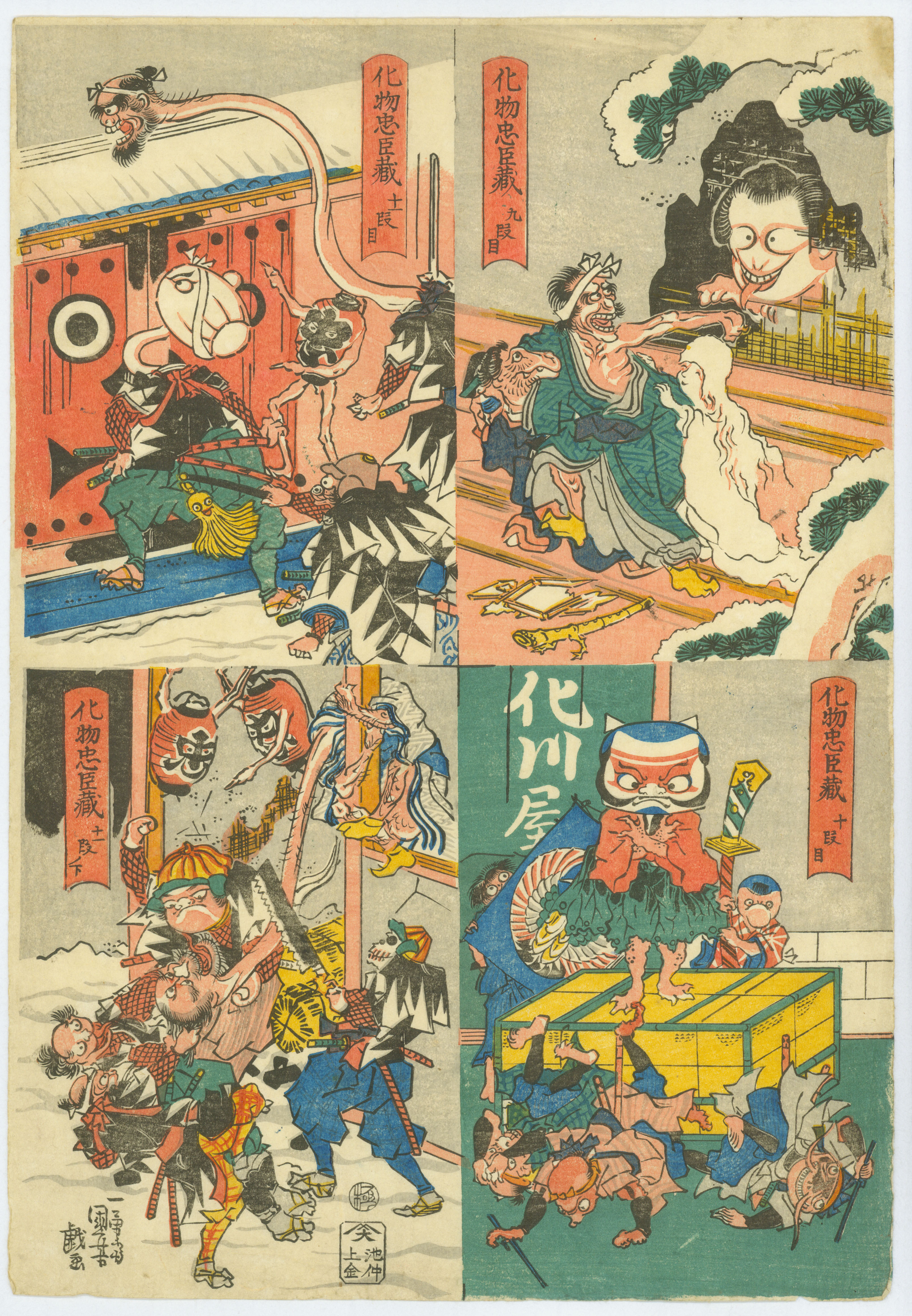
Utagawa Kuniyoshi, The Monster's Chūshingura (Bakemono Chūshingura), ca. 1836, Princeton University Art Museum, Acts 9–11 of the Kanadehon Chūshingura with act nine at top right, act ten at bottom right, act eleven, scene 1, at top left, act eleven, scene 2 at bottom left

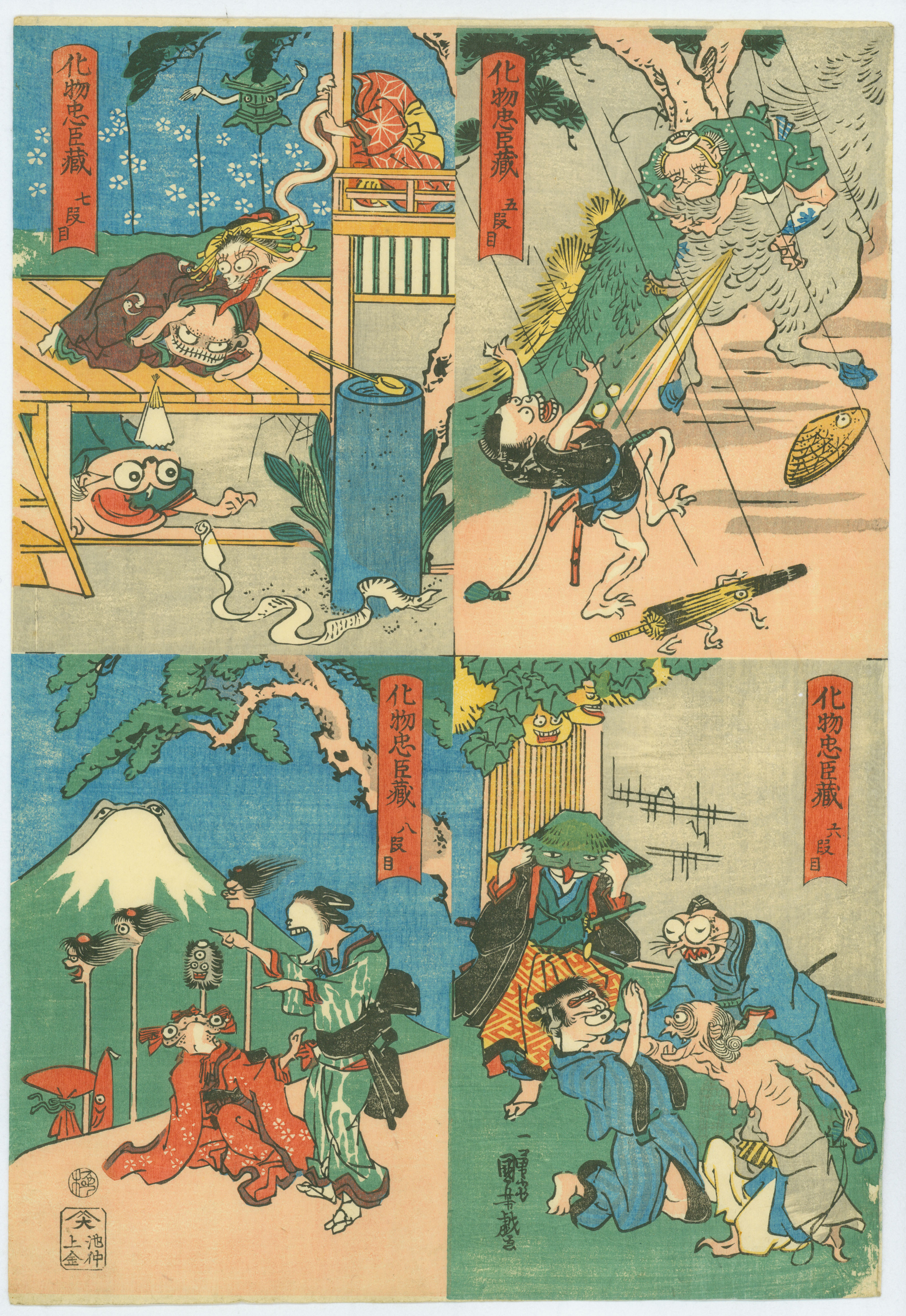
Utagawa Kuniyoshi, The Monster's Chūshingura (Bakemono Chūshingura), ca. 1836, Princeton University Art Museum, Acts 5–8 of the Kanadehon Chūshingura with act five at top right, act six at bottom right, act seven at top left, act eight at bottom left

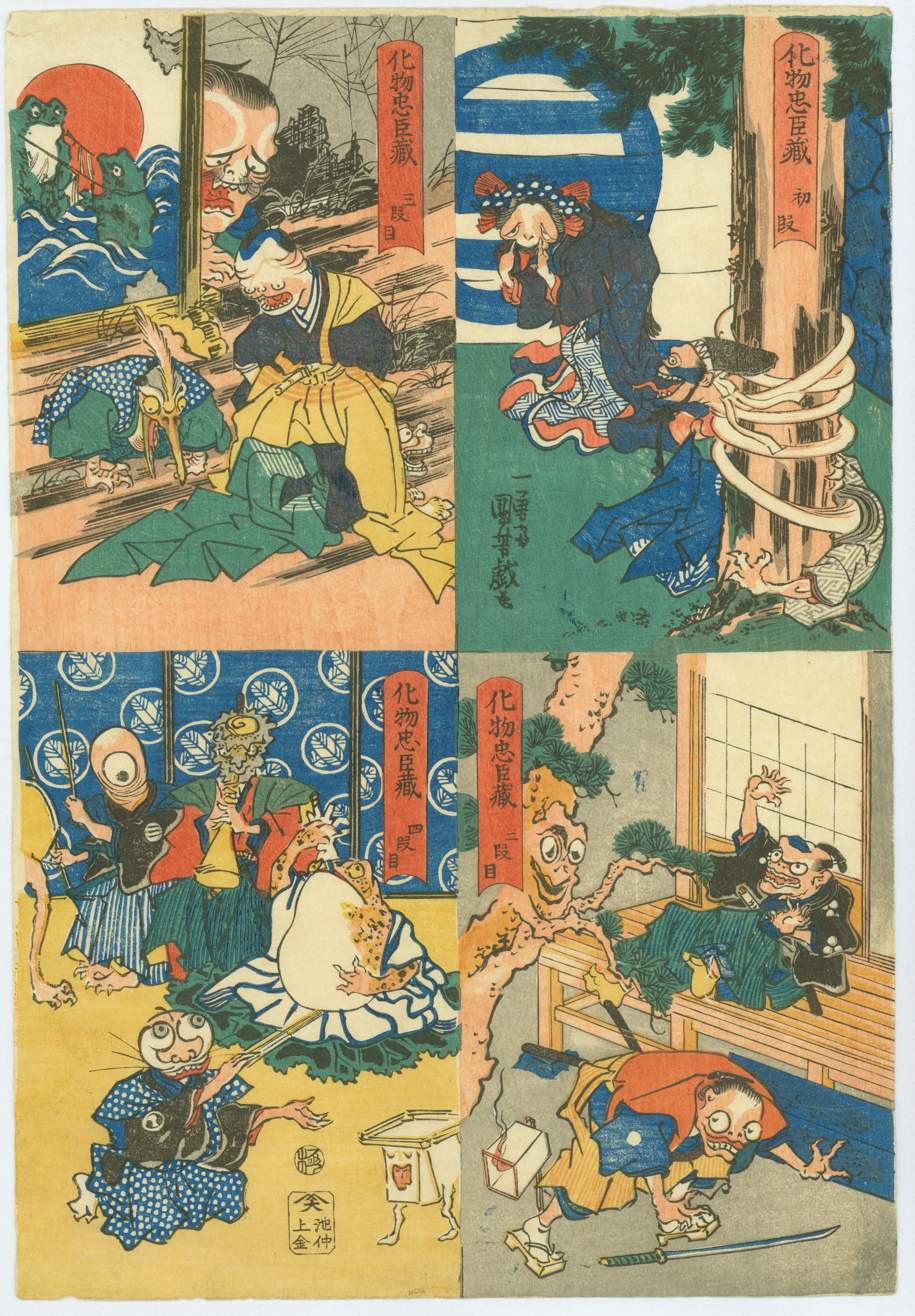
Utagawa Kuniyoshi, The Monster's Chūshingura (Bakemono Chūshingura), ca. 1836, Princeton University Art Museum, Acts 1–4 of the Kanadehon Chūshingura with act one at top right, act two at bottom right, act three at top left, act four at bottom left

== Films, television dramas, and other productions ==
December is a popular time for performances of Chūshingura. Because the break-in occurred in December (according to the old calendar), the story is often retold in that month.

=== Films ===
The history of Chūshingura on film began in 1907, when one act of a kabuki play was released. The first original production followed in 1908. Onoe Matsunosuke played Ōishi in this ground-breaking work. The story was adapted for film again in 1928. This version, Jitsuroku Chūshingura, was made by film-maker Shōzō Makino to commemorate his 50th birthday. Parts of the original film were destroyed when fire broke out during the production. However, these sequences have been restored with new technology.

A Nikkatsu film retold the events to audiences in 1930. It featured the famous Ōkōchi Denjirō in the role of Ōishi. Since then, three generations of leading men have starred in the role. Younger actors play Asano, and the role of Aguri, wife (and later widow) of Asano, is reserved for the most beautiful actresses. Kira, who was over sixty at his death, requires an older actor. Ōkōchi reprised the role in 1934. Other actors who have portrayed Ōishi in film include Bandō Tsumasaburō (1938), and Kawarasaki Chōjūrō IV (1941). In 1939, Kajirō Yamamoto filmed Chushingura in two parts with his then assistant director Akira Kurosawa. The two parts were titled Chushingura (Go) (1939) and Chushingura (Zen) (1939).

In 1941 the Japanese military commissioned director Kenji Mizoguchi to make The 47 Ronin. They wanted a ferocious morale booster based upon the familiar rekishi geki ("historical drama") of "The Loyal 47 Ronin". Instead, Mizoguchi chose for his source Mayama Chushingura, a cerebral play dealing with the story. The 47 Ronin was a commercial failure, having been released in Japan one week before the Attack on Pearl Harbor. The Japanese military and most audiences found the first part to be too serious, but the studio and Mizoguchi both regarded it as so important that Part Two was put into production, despite Part One's lukewarm reception. The film was celebrated by foreign scholars who saw it in Japan; it was not shown in the United States until the 1970s.

During the occupation of Japan, the GHQ banned performances of the story, charging them with promoting feudal values. Under the influence of Faubion Bowers, the ban was lifted in 1947. In 1952, the first film portrayal of Ōishi by Chiezō Kataoka appeared; he took the part again in 1959 and 1961. Matsumoto Kōshirō VIII (later Hakuō), Ichikawa Utaemon, Ichikawa Ennosuke II, Kinnosuke Yorozuya, Ken Takakura and Masahiko Tsugawa are among the most noteworthy actors to portray Ōishi.

The story was told again in the 1962 Toho production by the acclaimed director Hiroshi Inagaki titled Chūshingura: Hana no Maki, Yuki no Maki. The actor Matsumoto Kōshirō starred as Chamberlain Ōishi Kuranosuke and Toshiro Mifune also appeared in the film. The actress Setsuko Hara retired following her appearance as Riku, wife of Ōishi.

Other film versions include the 1978 adventure drama directed by Kinji Fukasaku and called The Fall of Ako Castle, or the 1985 Chūshingura: Vendetta of Obligation directed by Masuda Toshio and the 2010 Chūshingura (Sono Otoko Oishi Kuranosuke) directed by Saizo Kosei with Tamura Masakazu.

The Hollywood film 47 Ronin by Universal is a fantasy epic with Keanu Reeves as an Anglo-Japanese who joins the samurai in their quest for vengeance against Lord Kira who is aided by a shape-shifting witch, and co-stars many prominent Japanese actors including Hiroyuki Sanada, Tadanobu Asano, Kō Shibasaki, Rinko Kikuchi, Jin Akanishi, and Togo Igawa. It was originally scheduled to be released on November 21, 2012, then moved to February 8, 2013, due to creative differences between Universal and director Carl Rinsch, requiring the inclusion of additional scenes and citing the need for work on the 3D visual effects. It was later postponed to December 25, 2013, to account for the reshoots and post-production. Consistently negative film reviews of this film rendition considered it to have almost nothing in common with the original play.

=== Television dramas ===
The 1964 NHK Taiga drama Akō Rōshi was followed by no fewer than 21 television productions of Chūshingura. Toshirō Mifune starred in the 1971 Daichūshingura on NET, and Kinnosuke Yorozuya crossed over from film to play the same role in 1979, also on NET. In 1990, TBS aired a production of Chūshingura, starring Takeshi Kitano and Miho Nakayama, among others. Tōge no Gunzō, the third NHK Taiga drama on the subject, starred Ken Ogata, and renowned director Juzo Itami appeared as Kira. In 2001, Fuji TV made a four-hour special of the story starring Takuya Kimura as Horibe Yasubei (one of the Akō rōnin) and Kōichi Satō as Ōishi Kuranosuke, called Chūshingura 1/47. In 2004, the nine-episode mini-series Chūshingura directed by Saito Mitsumasa was broadcast. Kōtarō Satomi, Matsumoto Kōshirō IX, Beat Takeshi, Tatsuya Nakadai, Hiroki Matsukata, Kin'ya Kitaōji, Akira Emoto, Akira Nakao, Nakamura Kanzaburō XVIII, Ken Matsudaira, and Shinichi Tsutsumi are among the many stars to play Ōishi. Hisaya Morishige, Naoto Takenaka, and others have portrayed Kira. Izumi Inamori starred as Aguri (Yōzeiin), the central character in the ten-hour 2007 special Chūshingura Yōzeiin no Inbō.

The 1927 novel by Jirō Osaragi was the basis for the 1964 Taiga drama Akō Rōshi. Eiji Yoshikawa, Seiichi Funahashi, Futaro Yamada, Kōhei Tsuka, and Shōichirō Ikemiya have also published novels on the subject. Maruya Saiichi, Motohiko Izawa, and Kazuo Kumada have written criticisms of it.

An episode of the tokusatsu show Juken Sentai Gekiranger features its own spin on the Chūshingura, with the main heroes being sent back in time and Kira having been possessed by a Rin Jyu Ken user, whom they defeat before the Akō incident starts, and thus not interfering with it.

=== Ballet ===
The ballet choreographer Maurice Béjart created a ballet work called "The Kabuki" based on the Chushingura legend in 1986, and it has been performed more than 140 times in 14 nations worldwide by 2006.

=== Opera ===
The story was turned into an opera by Shigeaki Saegusa titled Chūshingura in 1997.

=== Popular music ===
"Chushingura" is the name of an instrumental track by Jefferson Airplane from its Crown of Creation album.

=== Books ===
Jorge Luis Borges' 1935 short story "The Uncivil Teacher of Court Etiquette Kôtsuké no Suké" (in A Universal History of Iniquity) is a retelling of the Chūshingura story, drawn from A. B. Mitford's Tales of Old Japan (London, 1912).

A 1982 comic book limited series written by Chris Claremont and drawn by Frank Miller titled Wolverine Vol. 1 has the titular superhero observe a private stage production in the course of a mission. The cast turn out to be actually assassins ordered to kill Mariko Yashida and her husband, forcing Wolverine to intervene to stop them.

A graphic novel/manga version, well researched and close to the original story, was written by Sean Michael Wilson and illustrated by Japanese artist Akiko Shimojima as The 47 Ronin: A Graphic Novel (2013).

A limited comic book series based on the story titled 47 Ronin, written by Dark Horse Comics publisher Mike Richardson, illustrated by Usagi Yojimbo creator Stan Sakai and with Lone Wolf and Cub writer Kazuo Koike as an editorial consultant, was released by Dark Horse Comics in 2013.

The Tokaido Road (1991) by Lucia St. Clair Robson is a historical adventure novel linked to the story by a fictional daughter of the murdered lord searching for her father's loyal men so she can take part in the revenge.

=== Anime ===
- Episode 113 of Lupin III Part 2 has Lupin visited by an old man who he doesn't realize is the ghost of Kira Yoshinaka, who employs him to help him look for a treasure. It turns out the treasure they were looking for is Kira's false teeth, which he needs to cross over into the next world. The rest of the episode parodies the play, with a chief named Asano being fired for lashing out at a man who insulted him and the devoted if accident-prone Zenigata willingly taking on the Oishi role to avenge him.

== See also ==
- Chūshingura: Hana no Maki, Yuki no Maki
- Matsu no Ōrōka

== Bibliography ==
- Brandon, James R. "Myth and Reality: A Story of Kabuki during American Censorship, 1945–1949", Asian Theatre Journal, Volume 23, Number 1, Spring 2006, pp. 1–110.
- Cavaye, Ronald, Paul Griffith and Akihiko Senda. (2005). A Guide to the Japanese Stage. Tokyo: Kodansha International. ISBN 978-4-7700-2987-4
- Dickins, Frederick V. (trans.), Chiushingura, or The Loyal League. A Japanese Romance. With Notes and an Appendix (1875; 2nd ed. Allen & Co., 1880)
- 新井政義（編集者）『日本史事典』。東京：旺文社 1987 (p. 87)
- Takeuchi, Rizō（編）『日本史小辞典』。東京：Kadokawa Shoten 1985, pp. 349–350.
- Forbes, Andrew; Henley, David (2012). Forty-Seven Ronin: Tsukioka Yoshitoshi Edition. Chiang Mai: Cognoscenti Books. ASIN: B00ADQGLB8
- Forbes, Andrew; Henley, David (2012). Forty-Seven Ronin: Utagawa Kuniyoshi Edition. Chiang Mai: Cognoscenti Books. ASIN: B00ADQM8II
- Nussbaum, Louis Frédéric and Käthe Roth. (2005). Japan Encyclopedia. Cambridge: Harvard University Press. ISBN 978-0-674-01753-5; OCLC 48943301
- Screech, Timon. (2006). Secret Memoirs of the Shoguns: Isaac Titsingh and Japan, 1779–1822. London: RoutledgeCurzon. ISBN 978-0-7007-1720-0 (cloth); ISBN 978-0-203-09985-8 (electronic)
- Postel, Philippe (2019), Les Vaillants d'Akô. Le mythe des quarante-sept rônins au Japon et en Occident. Paris: Classiques Garnier, "Perspectives comparatistes", 81. ISBN 978-2-406-07273-7. Postel, Philippe (2017), Les Quarante-sept rônin. Histoire d'un mythe en estampes. Nantes: Editions du château des ducs de Bretagne. ISBN 978-2-906519-64-0.
