= Takemoto Gidayū =

Takemoto Gidayū (竹本 義太夫, 1651 – 18 October 1714) was a jōruri chanter and the creator of a style of chanted narration for Japan's puppet theatre which has been used ever since. The name "gidayū" has since become the term for all jōruri chanters. He was a close colleague of the famous playwright Chikamatsu Monzaemon, and founder and manager of the Takemoto-za puppet theatre.

Originally known as Kiyomizu Gorōbei, he took on the name Takemoto Gidayū no Jō in 1701.

== Life and career ==
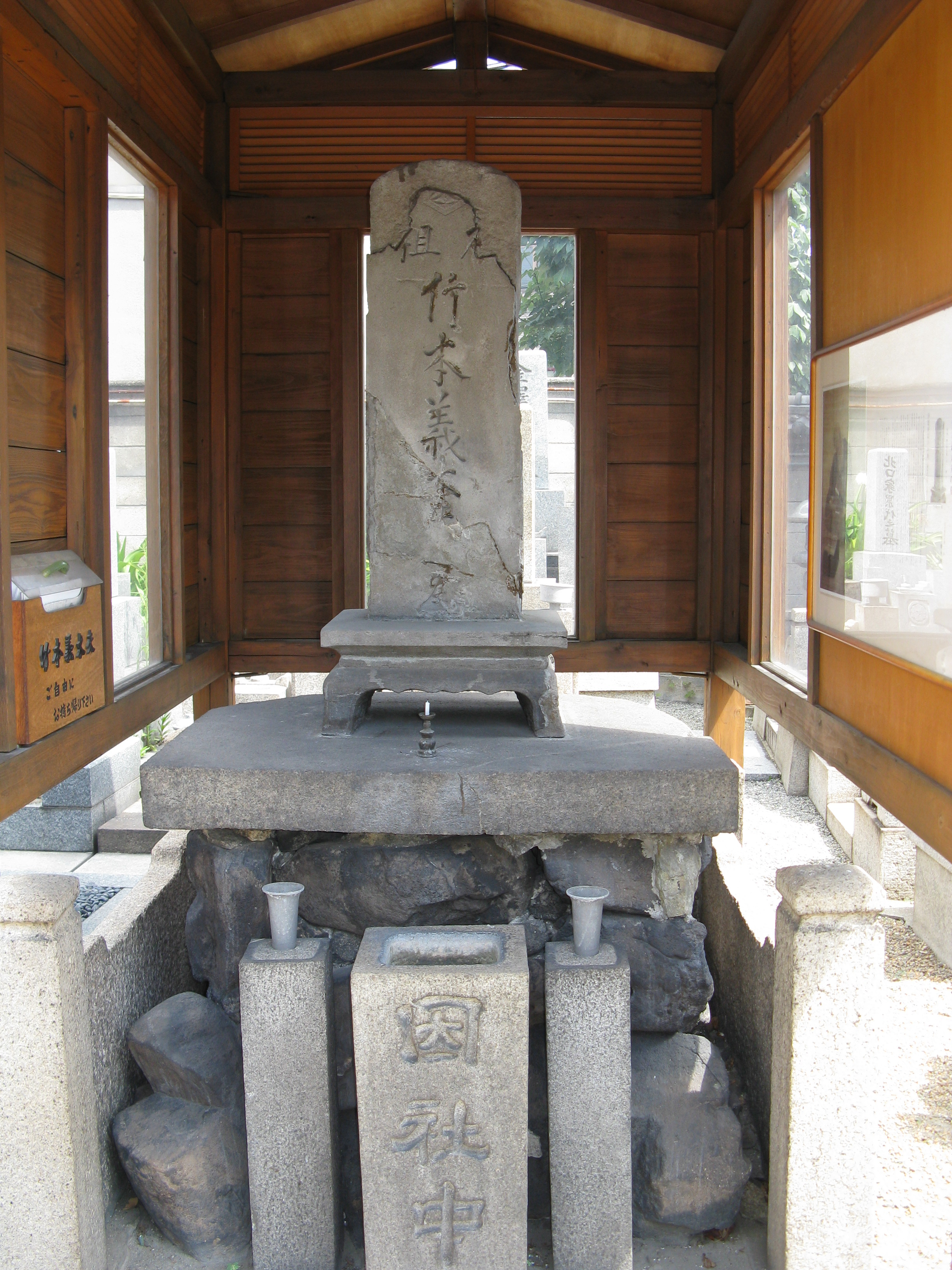
Tomb of Takemoto Gidayū, in Chōgan temple, Osaka

Gidayū was originally from the Tennōji neighborhood of Osaka, performed originally in Kyoto, as apprentice to Uji Kaganojō. In 1684, he left Kaganojō and Kyoto, returning to Osaka and founding the Takemoto-za theatre. The year after his arrival saw a competition between Gidayū and Kaganojō for audiences in Osaka, as well as number of failed countryside tours, but also marked the beginning of Gidayū's collaborations with Chikamatsu, who he had met in Kyoto. Together, the pair overhauled the traditional elements of jōruri and reinvented the form, transforming it into the form which would be popular through much of the Edo period, and which it retains today.

The Chihiroshū ("A Collection a Thousand Fathoms Deep"), Gidayū's first work to be published, was produced in 1686, though his most important treatise would come the following year. The Jōkyō yonen Gidayū danmonoshū ("Collection of Jōruri Scenes of the Fourth Year of Jōkyō"), like his other works, contained a lengthy preface containing elements of Gidayū's theories and attitudes regarding the theatre and performance. This text would remain a foundational one for jōruri performers up through the end of the 19th century.

Though Gidayū fully acknowledged the older traditional forms which jōruri drew upon, he thought of his art as a contemporary creation, and was known to poke fun at those who valued lineage and tradition over skill and beautiful performance. His writings also established frameworks for the structure of jōruri plays, based upon those described by Zeami Motokiyo for the Noh theatre. A play constructed according to Gidayū's framework has five acts, performed over the course of a whole day. The first act is an auspicious opening, the second characterized by conflict, the third, the climax of the play, by tragedy and pathos, the fourth a light michiyuki (travel scene), and the fifth a quick and auspicious conclusion.

Gidayū, along with all jōruri chanters in the tradition after him, chanted the narration of a play alone, along with all the spoken (or sung) lines of every character. The chanting style shifts dramatically between speaking and singing, and is based on a notation exclusive to jōruri, inscribed into the chanter's copy of the script. Chanters may not perform an entire play, changing places with another chanter after an act or two or three, but they only very rarely perform simultaneously alongside another chanter. These, and many others, are all traditions and form established, or significantly altered, by Gidayū.

His son Takemoto Seidayū followed him as director of the Takemoto-za and continued the style and forms established by Gidayū.
