= Jidaimono =

Japanese plays depicting historical events

Jidaimono (時代物) are Japanese kabuki or jōruri plays that feature historical plots and characters, often famous samurai battles. These are in contrast to sewamono (世話物), contemporary plays, which generally focus on commoners and domestic issues. 'Jidaimono' is usually translated as "period plays". Film and television productions in this mode are called jidaigeki (時代劇), and share many of the same features.

== Overview ==
As the stereotypical audience for jōruri and kabuki were the merchant classes (chōnin) of Edo period Japan, stories involving court nobles and heroic samurai were somewhat far removed from daily life, and the more everyday stories that dealt with contemporary, urban themes. Even though many of the viewers may have been samurai, the Edo period in which these plays were largely composed and performed was a period of peace, and so the notion of fierce battles and heroic sacrifices represented something of a romanticised escape in fiction.

Stories were almost always derived from classic epics (monogatari) or other historical sources, often with elements changed, such as the invention of characters to make the story more interesting or to otherwise serve the author's purposes.

Though most of these stories derive originally from historical fact, the sources used by the playwrights were more legend than accurate narratives, and fantastic or magical elements were further added by the playwrights. One jidaimono play, Yoshitsune Senbon Zakura, revolves around actual historical figures of the Genpei War, including Minamoto no Yoshitsune and his retainer Benkei. However, the historically false conceit that certain Taira clan generals survived and remain in hiding is central to the plot. Other fantastical elements, such as the kitsune (fox-spirit) character Genkurō, are also added to the story.

Though jidaimono almost always take place in the distant past, they often were intended to make reference to contemporary events. For much of the Edo period, the depiction of contemporary events, in particular, depictions of the shōguns and criticism of the Tokugawa shogunate, were strictly banned. As a result, plays were designed to use historical or literary references as metaphors for current events. The famous play Kanadehon Chūshingura, also known as the tale of the forty-seven rōnin, is one example; though the actual forty-seven rōnin and the events surrounding their attempts at revenge for their lord took place in the early 18th century, only a few decades before the play debuted, it was depicted onstage as taking place in the 14th century, with the names of all the principal figures involved being changed.

In many other plays, the Minamoto, from whom the Tokugawa shōguns claimed descent, were used to represent the shogunate. The Taira clan, who lost the Genpei War to the Minamoto clan in the 1180s, commonly were represented as oppressed or wronged, and symbolized the playwrights' (and perhaps the actors') criticisms of the Tokugawa government. Yoshitsune Senbon Zakura is one example of this, as is "Battles of Coxinga, which tells of the Ming Dynasty loyalist Coxinga who fought against the Qing Dynasty in the late 17th century.

Generally speaking, many of the most flamboyant kabuki plays are jidaimono, as they tend to feature over-the-top representations of samurai heroes and villains, kami, and some of the most famous figures in Japanese history. Commoners, the protagonists of sewamono, by contrast, are usually portrayed fairly plainly. However, both samurai, courtesans, and geisha also appear in sewamono, often with elaborate costumes and appearances.

== Terminology ==
- Sekai, "vertical plot" / shuko, "horizontal plot"
- Katsureki, a subgenre of living history plays meant to be accurate, not romanticised
