= Die Dorfschule =

- Opera by Felix Weingartner
- Language: German
- Based on: Sugawara Denju Tenarai Kagami

Die Dorfschule (The Village School), Op. 64, is a 1918 German opera in one act by Felix Weingartner based on act 4, scene 3, "Terakoya" (temple school), from the Japanese kabuki play Sugawara Denju Tenarai Kagami. The plot of the scene "Terakoya" concerns the samurai Matsuōmaru, who on learning of a plot to kill the son of his feudal lord sends his own son to the village school where the son dies in his master's son's place, fulfilling the family duty.

The subject of the opera had already been treated by the 17-year old Carl Orff as Gisei – Das Opfer, in June 1913, one of the juvenile works that Orff did not have performed during his lifetime. Orff's treatment was based on the German translation of "Terakoya" by Karl Florenz.

== Recordings ==
A 2012 recording of the opera has been issued on a 1-disc set by the German label cpo, in 2015 with the German Opera Orchestra, chorus and soloists conducted by Jacques Lacombe.

== Dating ==
The work was published in 1919 but composed in March 1918.
