= Hanamichi =

Runway leading from the back of a kabuki theatre to the stage

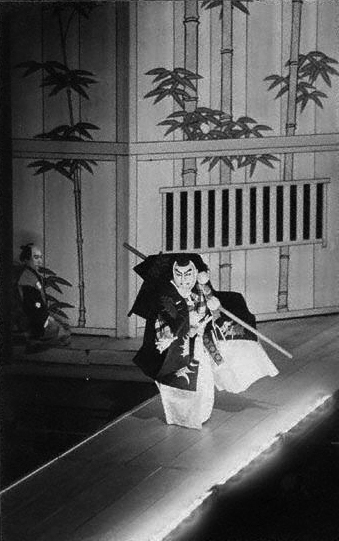
Benkei's signature disappearing act on the hanamichi

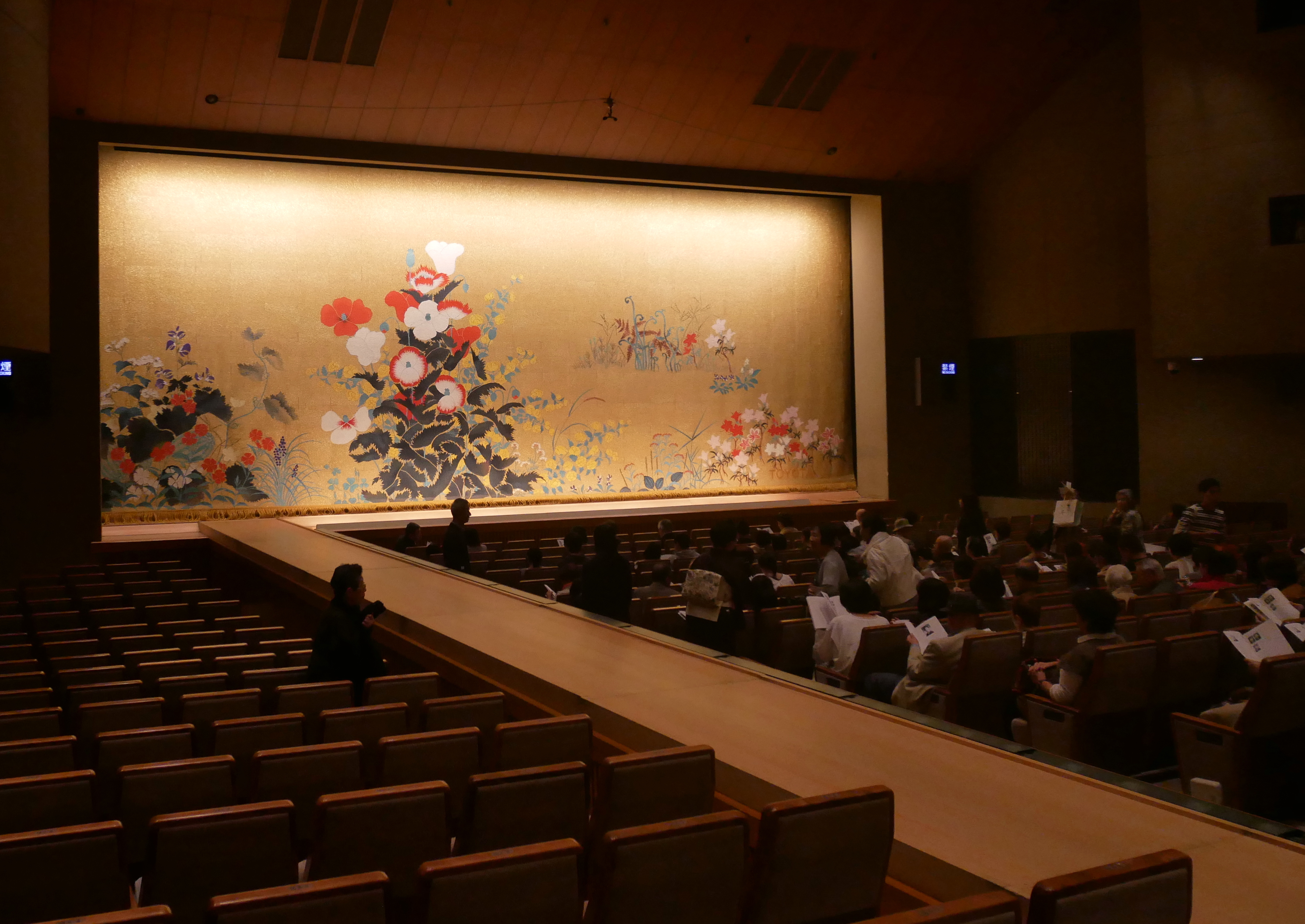
The hanamichi at National Theatre of Japan

The hanamichi (花道) is an extra stage section used in Japanese kabuki theater. It is a long, raised platform, running right of centre to the stage through the audience, connecting to the main stage.

The hanamichi is typically used for character entrances and exits, though is also used for asides and scenes that do not take place in the location as scenes on the main stage; the hanamichi also typically features a trapdoor just before the runway meets the stage, placed to be visible to everyone in the audience, which is commonly used for character entrances. Some kabuki plays also require the use of two hanamichi, running along the left and right of the audience.

== History ==
The hanamichi was first used in 1668 in the Kawarazaki-za, in the form of a simple wooden plank that reached from the centre of the stage to the middle of the theatre. It was not used in performances, but allowed actors to step into the audience after a performance to receive flowers, with the word 'hanamichi' literally meaning "flower path."

The modern style of hanamichi, sometimes called "honhanamichi" (本花道, "main flower path"), was first conceived and standardized in 1740. The standard size ranges from 16.38 metres (53.7 ft) – 18.20 metres (59.7 ft) long and 150 centimetres (59 in) – 180 centimetres (71 in) wide. Some theatres have since begun to make use of a secondary hanamichi on the right side of the audience, known as "karihanamichi" (仮花道, "copied flower path") which is one-third to half the width of the honhanamichi on the left.

== Usages ==
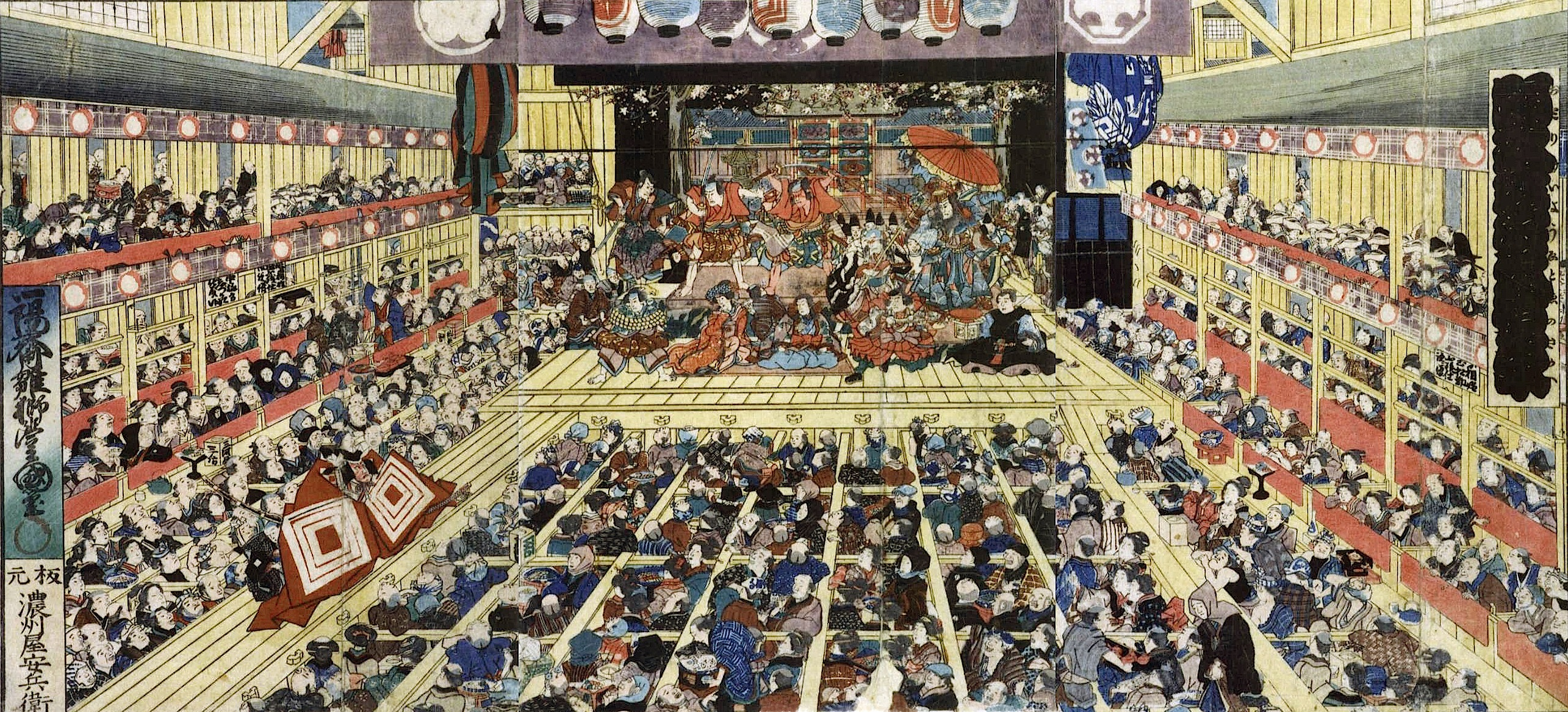
The July 1858 production of Shibaraku at the Edo Ichimura-za theatre, with the hanamichi shown on the left

Though rarely used for the main action of a play, much of the more dramatic or famous character moments occur during entrances or exits along the hanamichi. Many particularly dramatic actions take place seven-tenths of the way down the hanamachi (three-tenths away from the stage), at a spot known in Japanese as shichisan (七三) (lit., "seven-three"). It is here that exiting characters may say their final words, and entering characters may address the audience or the characters on stage. Since the hanamachi runs through the audience, it allows for a closer experience for the spectator than might normally be allowed by other forms of traditional theater.

== Sumo ==
In sumo, the path to the dohyō is also known as hanamichi.

== See also ==
- Kabuki
- Catwalk
