= Takeda Izumo II =

Japanese playwright (1691-1756)

Takeda Izumo II (1691–1756) was a Japanese playwright. The successor to Chikamatsu Monzaemon at the Takemoto Theater, Osaka, he wrote the three most celebrated period plays in the bunraku repertoire: Sugawara and the Secrets of Calligraphy (1746), Yoshitsune and the Thousand Cherry Trees (1747), and The Treasury of Loyal Retainers (1748). Leonard Pronko writes that although Chikamatsu's writing "possesses superior literary qualities, Izumo's has an undeniable variety, richness, and theatricality."
