= Kanadehon Chūshingura =

1748 bunraku puppet play

The Treasury of Loyal Retainers (仮名手本忠臣蔵, Kanadehon Chūshingura; Japanese pronunciation: [ka.na.deꜜ.hoɲ (|) tɕɯː.ɕiŋ.ɡɯ.ɾa, -ŋɯ.ɾa]) is an 11-act bunraku puppet play composed in 1748. It is one of the most popular Japanese plays, ranked with Zeami's Matsukaze, although the vivid action of Chūshingura differs dramatically from Matsukaze.

== Medium ==
During this portion of the Edo period, the major dramatists preferred not to write for the kabuki theater since the kabuki actors frequently departed from the texts to invent parts and aggrandize their own roles; however, Chūshingura was so successful that it was almost immediately adapted for the kabuki theater as well.

The general story has been depicted in many mediums such as ukiyo-e prints.

=== Kabuki ===
The kabuki adaptation appeared shortly after the puppet play did in Osaka and Kyoto, and soon was being performed by three companies in Edo. It is "only intermittently faithful" and frequently cuts entire acts. The saved time is available for a lengthier 11th act, with a sequence featuring a duel on a bridge; as well, the kabuki theater could use a revolving stage to switch between scenes of the siege in Act 9. The short sequence with the highwayman Sadakurō has been developed into an elaborate mime, rendering it a "coveted assignment" for ambitious actors.

== History ==
=== Composition ===
On 20 March 1703, the 46 rōnin were ordered to commit seppuku by the shōgun. Two weeks later, a kabuki play opened in Edo. It was entitled Akebono Soga no Youchi ("Night attack at dawn by the Soga [Brothers]"; see Soga Monogatari), a standard topic of plays. It was shut down by the authorities, and is thought to have been a disguised version of the recent events. Perhaps because of the touchiness of authorities, kabuki companies did not attempt any further plays on the subject.

In 1706, the great playwright Chikamatsu wrote a three-act puppet play entitled Goban Taiheiki ("A chronicle of great peace played on a chessboard"), placing the action in the era of Taiheiki (the 14th century); the third act appeared in another puppet play, and was ostensibly about the historical samurai Kō no Moronao; Moronao was actually a cipher for the offending master of court etiquette, Kira Yoshinaka, who was nearly slain by Asano Naganori. The use of Moronao's name for Kira and many of the other renamings would be copied in the later Chūshingura.

Three years later in the Kyoto-Osaka region where censorship was reportedly lighter, Chūshingura premiered.

It was an instant success, and was quickly imitated countless times, with variants coming out annually between 1706 and 1748.

=== Authorship ===
Early materials listed the authors in order as:

1. Takeda Izumo II
2. Miyoshi Shōraku
3. Namiki Senryū (Namiki Sōsuke)

Likely Izumo conceived the overall plot and write acts 1, 4, 6, & 9; Shōraku likely wrote 2, 10, and 11.

The fiction author Jippensha Ikku, in his analysis & anecdotal history Chūshingura Okame Hyōban (1803), implies that authorship was:

1. Izumo: Act 9
2. Shōraku: 2 & 10
3. Senryū: 4

Keene suggests that Acts 6 & 7 be assigned to Izumo, and Act 3 to Senryū.

These identifications are tentative, and not based on stylometry or similar approaches.

The multiple authorship may be responsible for some of the shifts characters undergo during the 11 acts:

"Sagisaka Bannai, for example, is a comical character in the third act, but by the seventh act there is hardly a trace left of his comicality, and at the end of the play the triumph of the loyal retainers is climaxed by killing Bannai, as if he, rather than Moronao, were the chief villain.

Again, Kakogawa Honzō fawningly offers bribes to Moronao in the third act by no means appears the same man as the heroic Honzō of the ninth act...

The same holds true of Rikiya; the blushing young man of the second act is so unlike the resolute hero of the ninth act as to require two actors."

Recent scholarship - most notably the analyses of Uchiyama Mikiko - has questioned the traditional attributions, and suggests that it was Namiki Sōsuke (Namiki Senryū) who played the principal authorial role in shaping both the overall dramatic design and several major scenes of Kanadehon Chūshingura, with Takeda Izumo II and Miyoshi Shōraku contributing in more limited capacities.

=== Translations ===
A Chinese translation appeared by 1794, and translations into English, French, and German by 1880 - making it 'probably the first work of Japanese literature to be translated' - and a play by John Masefield (The Faithful) appeared in 1915.

The Australian National University's Za Kabuki performed an English-language version of the play in 2001, directed by Mr. Shun Ikeda.

=== post-Edo period ===
After World War II, during the Occupation of Japan, performance of Chūshingura was banned "because it glorified militarism and was feudalistic in its insistence on such outmoded concepts as honor and loyalty"; later in 1960, members of the Japanese Diet criticized performances of Chūshingura overseas by traveling kabuki companies over similar fears that it would give foreigners misleading ideas

== Plot ==
The chiefest theme of Chūshingura is the code of bushido & loyalty, as exemplified by its protagonist, the chief retainer of the dead lord, Yuranosuke. The retainers seek revenge for their lord even though they know no good will come of it, as Yuranosuke admits in Act 7:

"I realized when I thought about it calmly that if we failed in our mission our heads would roll, and if we succeeded we'd have to commit seppuku afterwards. either way, it was certain death. It was like taking expensive medicine, then hanging yourself afterwards because you couldn't pay for the cure."

Yuranosuke in this speech is cloaking his true intentions, as he must constantly through the play, rendering him a challenging role.

It has been argued that in reality, En'ya was undeserving of loyalty as he was arrogant & hot-tempered and Moronao was a good man who helped the peasants on his land - thus further emphasizing the unconditional nature of Yuranosuke and the other rōnin's loyalty.

=== Act 1 ===
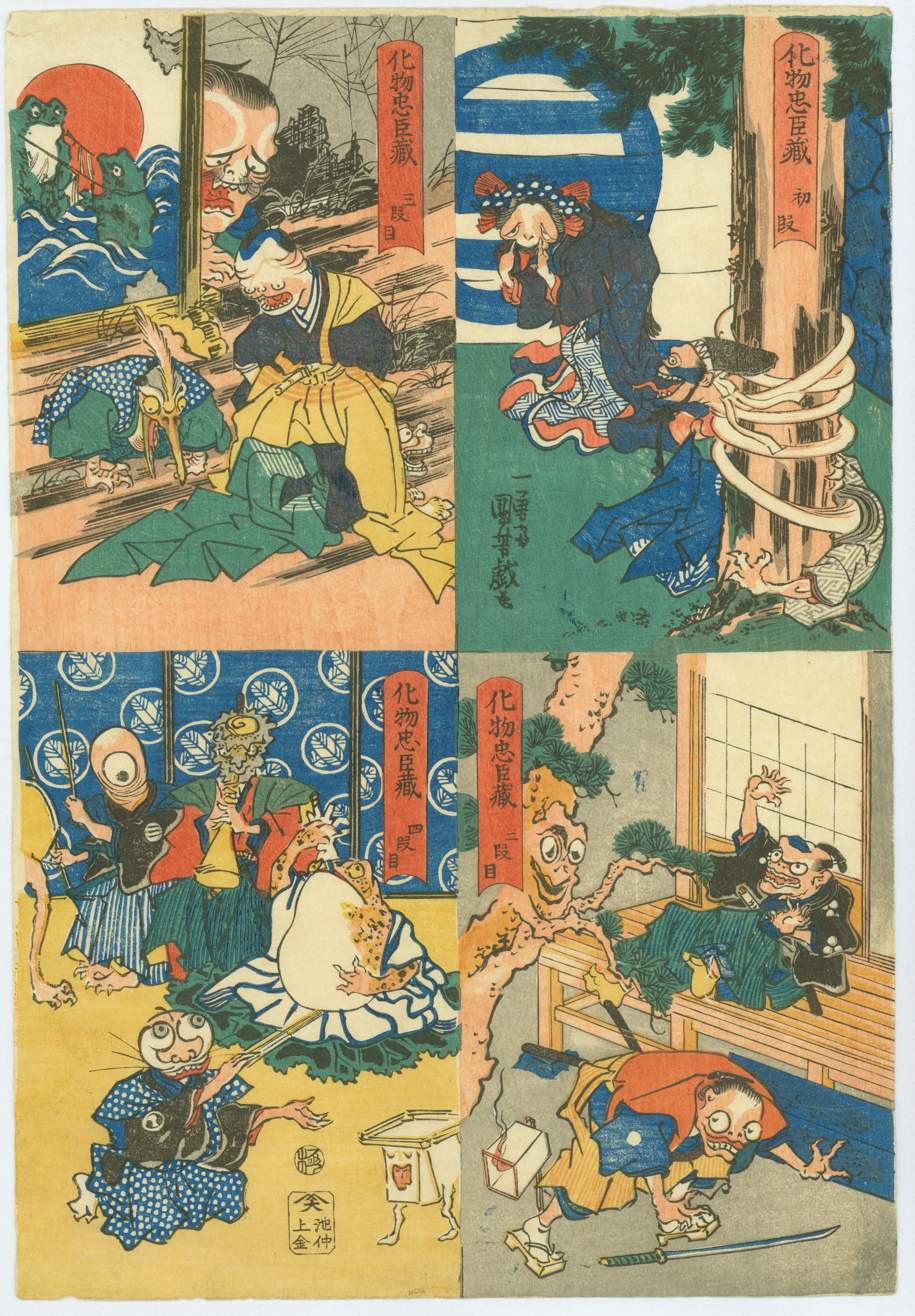
Utagawa Kuniyoshi, The Monster's Chūshingura (Bakemono Chūshingura), ca. 1836, Princeton University Art Museum, Acts 1–4 of the Kanadehon Chūshingura with act one at top right, act two at bottom right, act three at top left, act four at bottom left

"The same holds true of a country at peace: the loyalty and courage of its fine soldiers remain hidden, but the stars, though invisible by day, at night reveal themselves, scattered over the firmament. Here we shall describe such an instance ..."—Narrator

The shōgun Ashikaga Takauji has put down the Genko uprising led by the nobleman Nitta Yoshisada, and has built a shrine to the kami of war Hachiman to commemorate his victory. Its chief trophy will be the helmet of the dead Yoshisada, but there is confusion as to which of the 47 helmets found by his body is really his.

The shōgun's brother & deputy, Ashikaga Tadayoshi, convenes a conference to discuss the issue. Attending is the governor of Kamakura, Lord Moronao (Kira), Wakasanosuke, and Lord En'ya (Asano). Moronao objects to preserving the helmet, even though Yoshisada was a noble descendant of the Genji, a mistake would be embarrassing, and there were many loyal retainers descended from the Genji anyway. En'ya and Wakasanosuke support the helmet's preservation.

Tadayoshi summons En'ya's wife, for as a maiden in the imperial palace, she saw the helmet presented to Yoshisada. She verifies the correct choice. As the conference ends, Moronao, who has been tutoring En'ya's wife in classical waka poetry, presses upon her a love letter. She rejects it entirely, and Moronao is embittered with hatred for En'ya.

=== Act 2 ===
En'ya sends his retainers a message that he and Moronao have been charged with the welcoming of Tadayoshi the next day. Wakasanosuke, aware of Moronao's rejection, tells his fellow retainer Honzō of his plan to assassinate Moronao before Moronao can attack or provoke their master En'ya. Honzō applauds the plan, suggests that Wakasanosuke take a nap first, and immediately departs to find Moronao first to bribe him.

=== Act 3 ===
Honzō finds Moronao at Tadayoshi's palace, and delivers his handsome bribe in the guise of thanks for etiquette instruction. Moronao accepts it and invites Honzō to an audience.

After an interlude in which a minor retainer of En'ya, Kanpei, gives into temptation to leave his post with his lover, Wakasanosuke arrives. When Wakasanosuke encounters Moronao, Moronao's attitude is so welcoming and apologetic that Wakasanosuke confusedly abandons his murderous intentions - as Honzō planned.

Unfortunately, when En'ya arrives, he comes bearing a note from his wife to Moronao; it is a poem from the Shin Kokin Wakashū which indicates her definitive rejection of Moronao's love.

Angered, Moronao takes exception to En'ya's tardiness and begins mercilessly insulting & verbally abusing En'ya. Provoked beyond his limits, En'ya draws and slashes Moronao. He does not kill Moronao as he is held back by Honzō (who hopes to lessen En'ya's punishment).

Outside, Kanpei hears the commotion and rushes to the back gate, only to realize his failure as a samurai: he dallied and was not there when his master needed him.

=== Act 4 ===
En'ya is placed under house arrest. The retainers and women discuss his fate, and En'ya's wife, Kaoyo, reveals Moronao's motives.

The shōgun's envoys arrive with En'ya's sentence: seppuku, confiscation of En'ya's estate, and the reduction of his men to rōnin.

En'ya's chief retainer, Yuranosuke, rushes in just as En'ya is pulling the dagger across his stomach; En'ya charges him with seeking vengeance. Yuranosuke orders the men to not commit seppuku nor barricade the mansion and die fighting the shogunate, but likewise to seek vengeance.

=== Act 5 ===
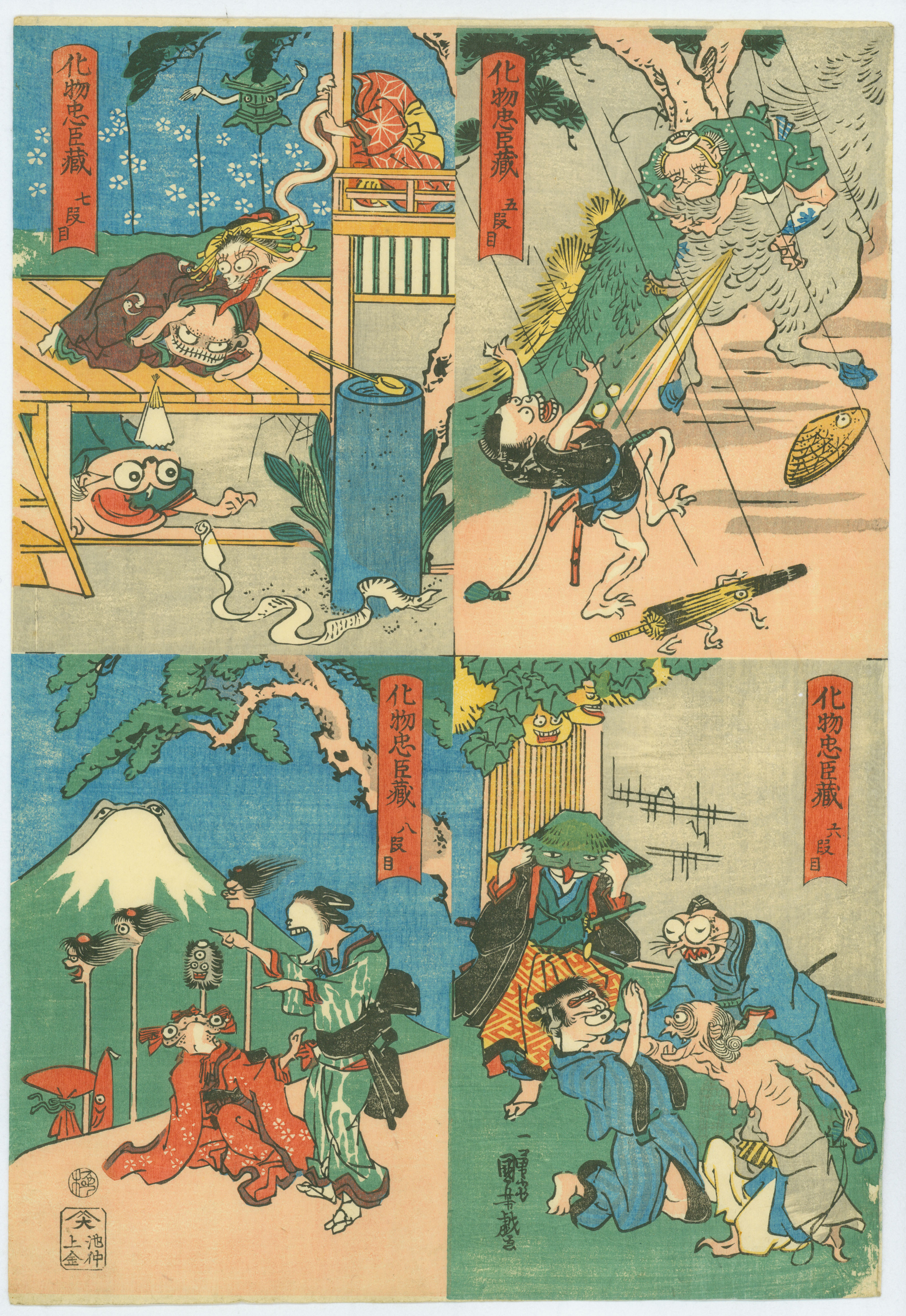
Utagawa Kuniyoshi, The Monster's Chūshingura (Bakemono Chūshingura), ca. 1836, Princeton University Art Museum, Acts 5–8 of the Kanadehon Chūshingura with act five at top right, act six at bottom right, act seven at top left, act eight at bottom left

Kanpei, long after the expulsion, has become a hunter. One rainy day, he meets on the highway a fellow rōnin. The conversation reveals that Yuranosuke and the others did not immediately assault Moronao's extremely well guarded mansion, but dispersed peacefully, and that Yuranosuke & his son have fallen into decadent seeking of pleasure. Kanpei mentions rumors he has heard that 40 or so of the rōnin are conspiring to kill Moronao. The other rōnin categorically denies this: the meetings and solicitations are for the charitable purpose of raising funds for a fitting memorial for En'ya's grave. Kanpei resolves to acquire money to donate towards the memorial.

Later, an old man comes along the road with the large sum of 50 ryō in his wallet, earned by selling his daughter — Kanpei's wife — to a brothel. He is accosted and then killed by Sadakurō the highwayman.

No sooner has Sadakurō hidden the body and counted the money than he is accidentally shot by Kanpei, hunting a boar. Kanpei does not see clearly the body in the dark, but takes the money as a gift from heaven and hurries home with his donation to find the other rōnin.

=== Act 6 ===
At Kanpei's home, his wife and mother-in-law await the return of the old man; their money will enable Kanpei to become a samurai again. But he has yet to return when the pimp comes to claim Kanpei's wife. While the pimp argues with them and describes his transaction with the old man, Kanpei arrives with the tell-tale wallet. He is accused of murdering his father-in-law, and because it was dark, even Kanpei believes it.

While Kanpei gives his account of events, he commits seppuku. His fellow rōnin arrive, and tell how they inspected the body of the old man more carefully - he had died of a sword, not a gun. But it is too late for Kanpei. Impressed by his dying sincerity, they accept the donation and allow Kanpei to sign in blood the written oath of vengeance to become the 46th member.

=== Act 7 ===
"It's quite true that I felt a certain amount of indignation — about as big as a flea's head split by a hatchet — and tried forming a league of 40 or 50 men, but what a crazy notion that was! ... Oh, when I hear the samisens playing like that, I just can't resist."—Yuranosuke

Kudayū, now a spy for Moronao, arrives at a teahouse in the pleasure quarter of Gion — Yuranosuke's favorite haunt (in reality Ichiriki Chaya, which changed its name to the disguised name in this play). He intends to learn whether Yuranosuke is indeed dissipated.

3 rōnin are also there on a similar mission: when Yuranosuke disavows revenge, they plan to kill him as a warning to the others not to waver. But they decide to let him sober up first.

While waiting, Yuranosuke receives a letter from Kaoyo to the effect that Moronao is leaving for the provinces and they will need to strike soon.

Just then, Kudayū interrupts and accuses Yuranosuke of being wanton as a deceptive stratagem. But seeing Yuranosuke casually break a taboo and eat octopus on the anniversary of En'ya's death, and looking at how rusty his sword is, Kudayū is almost convinced — but he hides under the veranda to spy on the letter, to make sure. He is shortly stabbed to death by Yuranosuke.

=== Act 8 ===
An act in the michiyuki style, a standard short act written poetically, describing the gloomy thought of Konami, daughter of Honzō and fiance of Rikiya, as she travels with her mother to Rikiya and Yuranosuke's house. They hope the marriage will be carried out, though all presume it was broken off when Rikiya and Yuranosuke became rōnin.

=== Act 9 ===
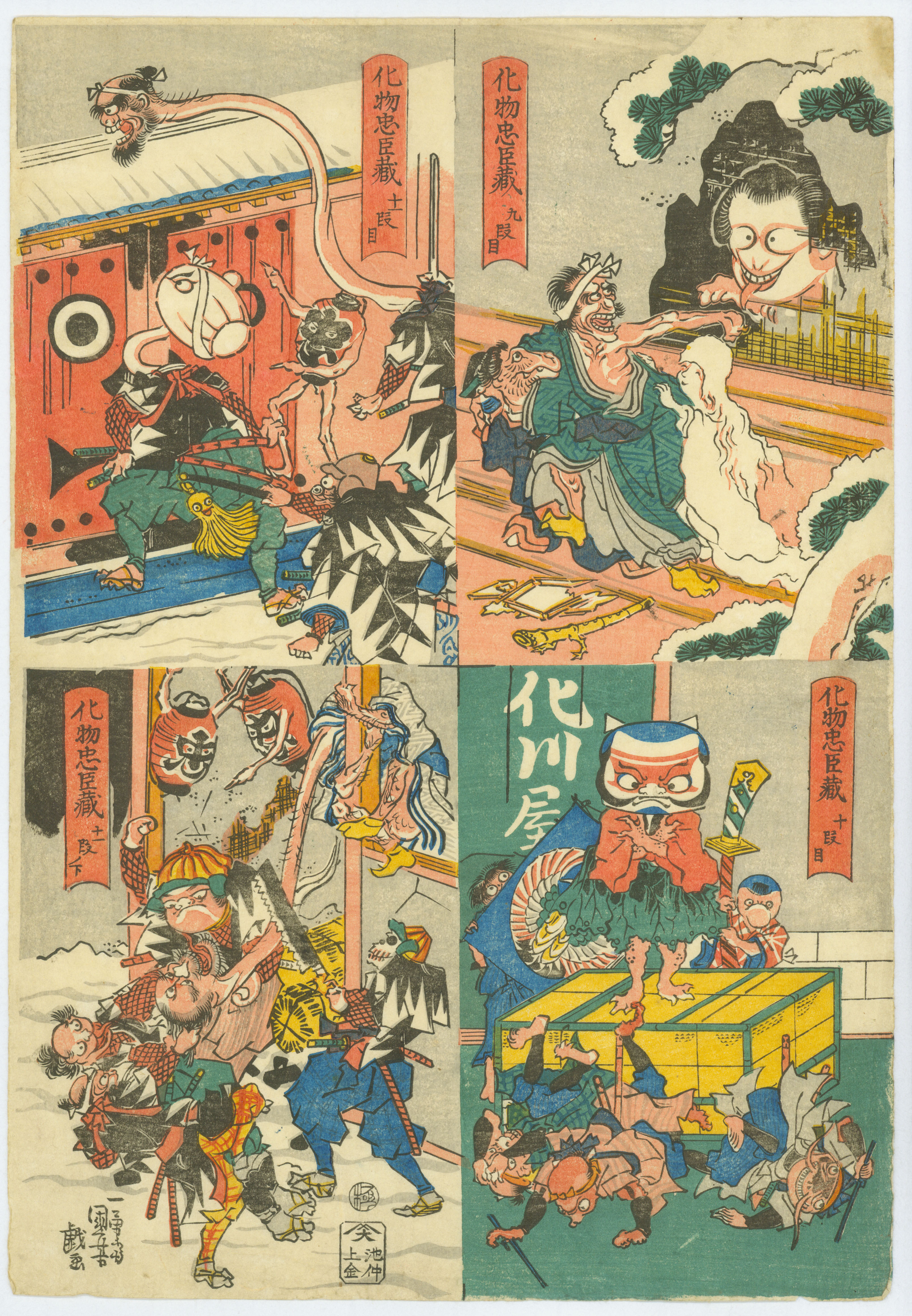
Utagawa Kuniyoshi, The Monster's Chūshingura (Bakemono Chūshingura), ca. 1836, Princeton University Art Museum, Acts 9–11 of the Kanadehon Chūshingura with act nine at top right, act ten at bottom right, act eleven, scene 1, at top left, act eleven, scene 2 at bottom left

Konami arrives at Yuranosuke's house, and her mother asks Yuranosuke's wife to permit the marriage's consummation. She is rebuffed because of Honzō's bribery of Moronao and restraining En'ya from killing him. The mother and daughter resolve to commit seppuku, impressing Yuranosuke's wife, who consents if Honzō's head is brought to her as a wedding gift. Honzō unexpectedly appears, insults Yuranosuke and Rikiya as debauchees, provoking Yuranosuke's wife to attack him with a lance. Honzō disarms and pins her, when Rikiya enters and stabs Honzō with the discarded lance — just as Honzō planned.

Honzō provides the ground plans for Moronao's mansion and expires, having atoned for his prudence.

=== Act 10 ===
The merchant Gihei of the port of Sakai is loading onto a ship his highly illegal cargo: more than 40 sets of samurai armor and weapons. 2 rōnin visit to inquire about the preparations. Later, he is surrounded by dozens of police who threaten to kill his son if he doesn't confess. The merchant scorns them and makes to strangle his son. Yuranosuke bursts out: it was a test, and the rōnin are impressed. They will use his shop name as a password. (Of course, since he was born a merchant, he cannot join the raid no matter how much he sacrifices.)

=== Act 11 ===
The 46 rōnin (the dead Kanpei making 47) stage an amphibious assault with rowboats. A party scales the walls, captures the nightwatchman, and open the front & back gates. A fierce battle ensues. The neighboring mansions attempt to interfere, but when the rōnin's mission is explained, they applaud and return home. Moronao is soon captured and hacked to death by all the men, Yuranosuke striking first. They offer up his head with incense to En'ya's memorial tablets and withdraw to En'ya's family temple to await their fates.

== See also ==
- Chūshingura
