= Michiyuki =

Japanese theatrical term

Michiyuki (道行文, michiyuki-bun; lit. "road travel literature") is the term for a journey scene in Japanese theatre, which shows the characters dancing or conversing while travelling.

The term michiyuki (道行; lit. "journeying"), in its generic sense of michi wo yuku "to go on a road", is used in lyrical descriptions of journeys from the 8th century. It was also a term for the music in bugaku dances of the Heian period, played while a dancer was moving onto the stage. As a technical term in Noh and Kabuki theatre, michiyuki is used from the 16th century.

In Noh, the michiyuki customarily takes the function of a prologue, the characters introducing the play while travelling to the location where the main action will take place. In Kabuki, by contrast, the michiyuki often takes place in the last act. The michiyuki is performed by the travelling characters moving about in a steady pace either on the main stage or on the hanamichi (a walkway or "corridor" attached to the main stage).

== See also ==
- Tōkaidōchū Hizakurige
- Walk and talk
- Penny dreadfuls
