= Shōzō =

- Gender: Male

Origin
- Origin: Japanese
- Meaning: Different meanings depending on the kanji used

Shōzō, Shozo, Shouzou or Shohzoh (written: 昭三, 省三, 省蔵, 省太, 正三, 正蔵 or 昌三) is a masculine Japanese given name. Notable people with the name include:

- Shōzō Fujii (藤猪 省太; born 1950), Japanese judoka
- Shozo Fujita (藤田 省三; 1927–2003), Japanese historian
- Shōzō Hayashiya IX (九代目 林家 正蔵; born 1962), Japanese comedian and voice actor
- Shōzō Iizuka (飯塚 昭三; 1933–2023), Japanese voice actor
- Shozo Ishihara (石原 省三; 1910–1993), Japanese speed skater
- Shouzou Kaga (加賀 昭三; born 1950), Japanese video game designer
- Kawasaki Shōzō (川崎 正蔵; 1837–1912), Japanese businessman and shipbuilder
- Shōzō Kitadai (北代 省三; 1921–2003), Japanese photographer
- Shozo "Strong" Kobayashi (ストロング小林; 1940–2021), Japanese professional wrestler and actor
- Shozo Majima (真島 省三; born 1963), Japanese politician
- Shōzō Makino (director) (マキノ 省三; 1878–1929), Japanese film director, producer and businessman
- Shozo Makino (swimmer) (牧野 正蔵; 1915–1987), Japanese swimmer
- Shozo Miyamoto (宮本 省三; born 1940), Japanese golfer
- Shōzō Murata (村田 省蔵; 1878–1957), Japanese businessman, politician and diplomat
- Namiki Shōzō I (並木 正三; 1730–1773), Japanese playwright
- Namiki Shōzō II (並木 正三; died 1807), Japanese playwright
- Shozo Saijo (西城 正三; born 1947), Japanese boxer
- Shōzō Sakurai (樱井 省三; 1889–1985), Japanese general
- Shozo Sasahara (笹原 正三; born 1929), Japanese sport wrestler
- Shozo Sasaki (佐々木 昭三; born 1944), Japanese biathlete
- Shozo Shimamoto (嶋本 昭三; born 1928), Japanese artist
- Shōzō Tanaka (田中 正造; 1841–1913), Japanese politician and social activist
- Shozo Tominaga (富永 正三; died 2002), Japanese activist
- Shozo Tsugitani (継谷 昌三; born 1940), Japanese footballer
- Shozo Yoshigami (吉上 昭三; 1928–1996), Japanese translator and academic
