= Namiki (surname) =

Namiki (written: 並木 lit. "roadside tree") is a Japanese surname. Notable people with the surname include:

- Namiki Gohei I (並木五瓶初代; 1747–1808), Japanese kabuki playwright
- Hidetaka Namiki (並木 秀尊; born 1998), Japanese professional baseball player
- Manabu Namiki (並木 学; born 1971), Japanese video game composer
- Masayoshi Namiki (並木 正芳; born 1949), Japanese former politician
- Namiki Shōzō I (並木正三; 1730–1773), Japanese kabuki and bunraku playwright
- Namiki Shōzō II (並木正三; died 1807), Japanese kabuki playwright
- Namiki Sōsuke (並木宗輔; 1695–1751), Japanese kabuki and bunraku playwright
- Tsukimi Namiki (並木 月海; born 1998), Japanese amateur boxer
- Yoshinori Namiki (並木 良憲; born 1963), Japanese weightlifter
