= Ishikawa Goemon =

Japanese folk hero

Ishikawa Goemon 石川 五右衛門
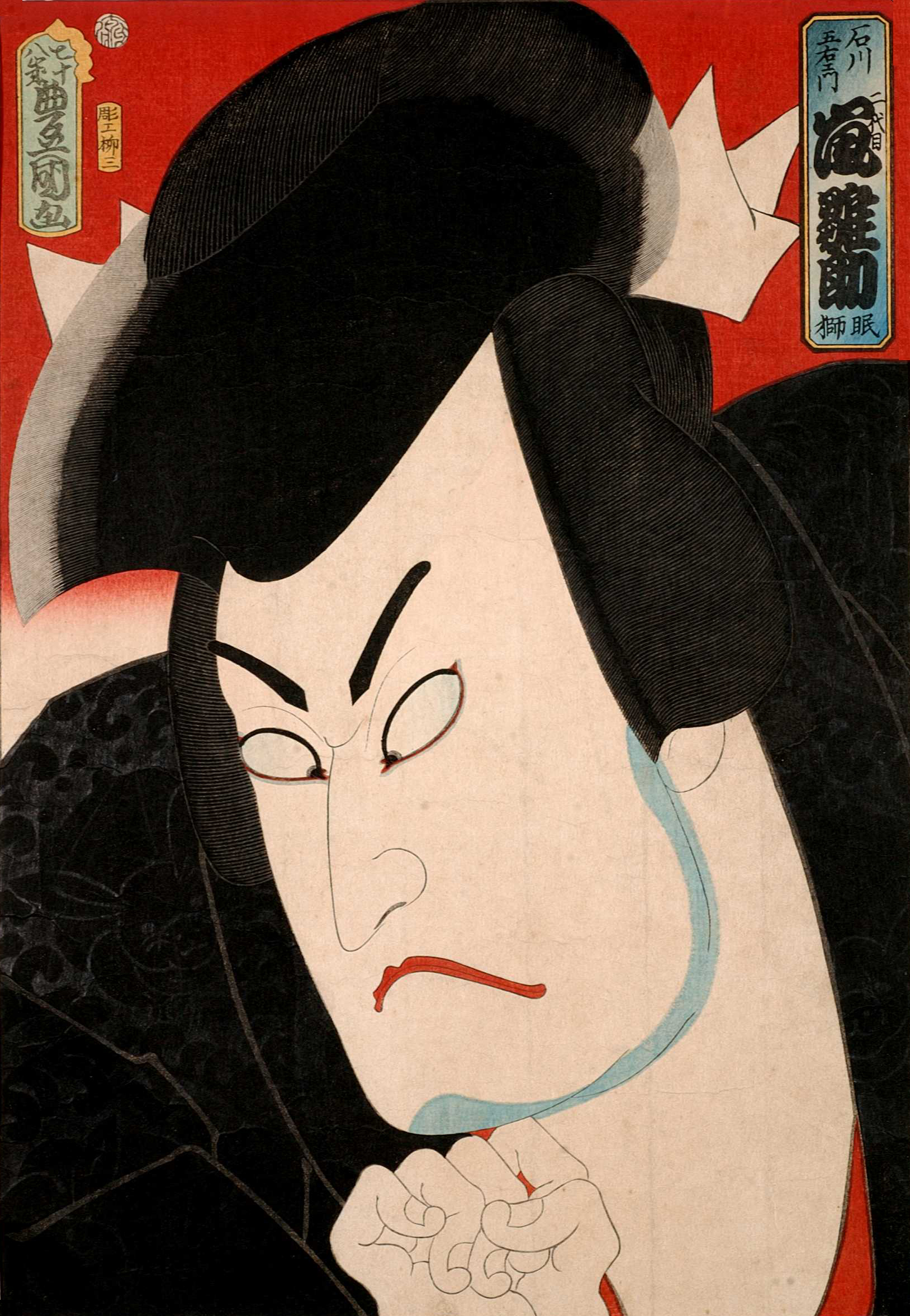
- Goemon as played by kabuki actor Hinasuke Arashi II (an 1863 painting by Toyokuni III)
- Born: August 24, 1558, Ashikaga Shogunate
- Died: October 8, 1594 (aged 36); Nanzen-ji, Kyoto, Japan
- Cause of death: Execution by boiling
- Occupation: Thief

Ishikawa Goemon (石川 五右衛門, Ishikawa Goemon; Japanese pronunciation: [ì.ɕi̥.kä́.β̞ä́ | ɡò̞.é̞.mó̞ɴ́, -β̞ä́ ɡó̞-], August 24, 1558 – October 8, 1594) was the leader of a group of bandits during the Azuchi-Momoyama period in Japan. Over time, and especially during the Edo period (1603–1867), his life and deeds became a center of attention, and he became known as a legendary Japanese outlaw hero who stole gold and other valuables to give to the poor.

He and his son were boiled alive in public after their failed assassination attempt on the Sengoku period warlord Toyotomi Hideyoshi. His legend lives on in contemporary Japanese popular culture, often giving him greatly exaggerated ninja skills.

== Biography ==
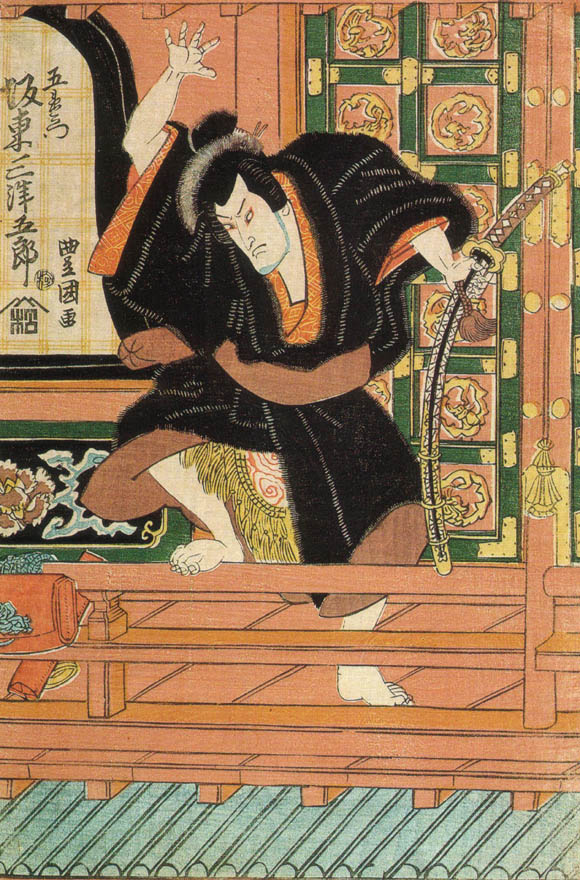
Bandō Mitsugorō III playing the role of Ishikawa Goemon in the kabuki drama Sanmon Gosan no Kiri, which was staged in 1820 at the Nakamura-za theater (print made by Utagawa Toyokuni I)

There is little historical information on Goemon's life, and as he has become a folk hero, his background and origins have been widely speculated upon. In his first appearance in the historical annals, in the 1642 biography of Hideyoshi, Goemon was referred to simply as a thief. As his legend became popular, various anti-authoritarian exploits were attributed to him, including a supposed assassination attempt against the Oda clan warlord Oda Nobunaga.

There are many versions of Goemon's background and accounts of his life. According to one of them, he was born as Sanada Kuranoshin in 1558 to a samurai family in service of the powerful Miyoshi clan in Iga Province. In 1573, when his father (possibly Ishikawa Akashi) was killed by the men of Ashikaga shogunate (in some versions his mother was also killed), the 15-year-old Sanada swore revenge and began training the arts of Iga ninjutsu under Momochi Sandayu (Momochi Tamba). He was, however, forced to flee when his master discovered Sanada's romance with one of his mistresses (but not before stealing a prized sword from his teacher). Some other sources state his name as Gorokizu (五郎吉) and say he came from Kawachi Province and was not a nukenin (runaway ninja) at all. He then moved to the neighbouring Kansai region, where he formed and led a band of thieves and bandits as Ishikawa Goemon, robbing the rich feudal lords, merchants and clerics, and sharing the loot with the oppressed peasants. According to another version, which also attributed a failed poisoning attempt on Nobunaga's life to Goemon, he was forced to become a robber when the ninja networks were broken up.

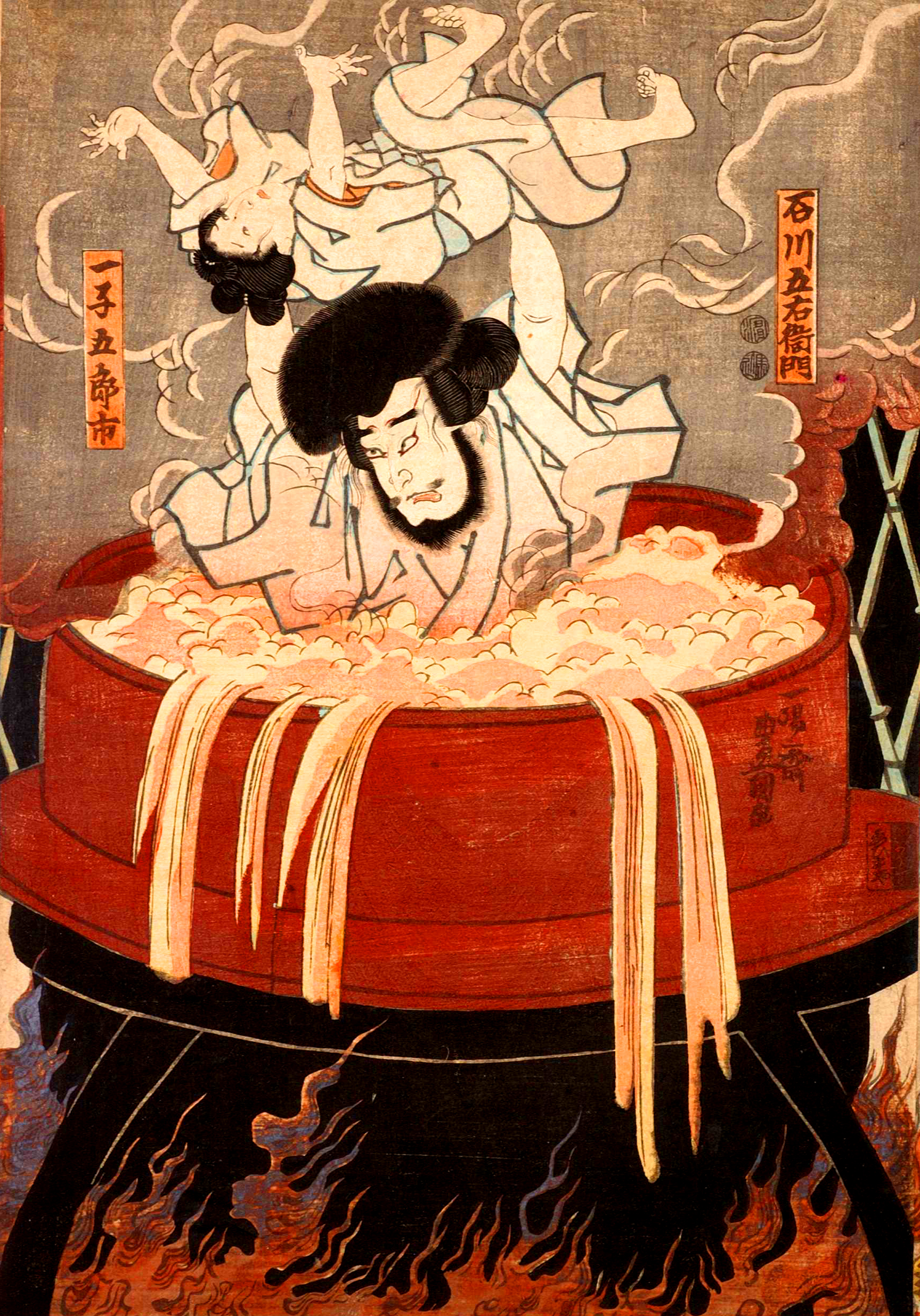
Execution of Goemon Ishikawa (a late 19th-century picture by Toyokuni Ichiyōsai)

There are also several conflicting accounts of Goemon's public execution by boiling on the banks of the Kamo River in Kyoto, including but not limited to the following ones:

- Goemon tried to assassinate Hideyoshi to avenge the death of his wife Otaki and the capture of his son, Gobei. He snuck into Fushimi Castle and entered Hideyoshi's room but knocked a bell off a table. The noise awoke the guards and Goemon was captured. He was sentenced to death by being boiled alive in an iron cauldron along with his very young son, but was able to save his son by holding him above his head. His son was then forgiven.
- Goemon wanted to kill Hideyoshi because he was a despot. When he entered Hideyoshi's room, he was detected by a mystical incense burner. He was executed on October 8 along with his whole family by being boiled alive. Goemon at first tried to save his son from the heat by holding him high above, but then suddenly plunged him deep into the bottom of the cauldron to kill him as quickly as possible. Then he stood with the body of the boy held high in the air in defiance of his enemies, until he eventually succumbed to pain and injuries and sank into the pot.

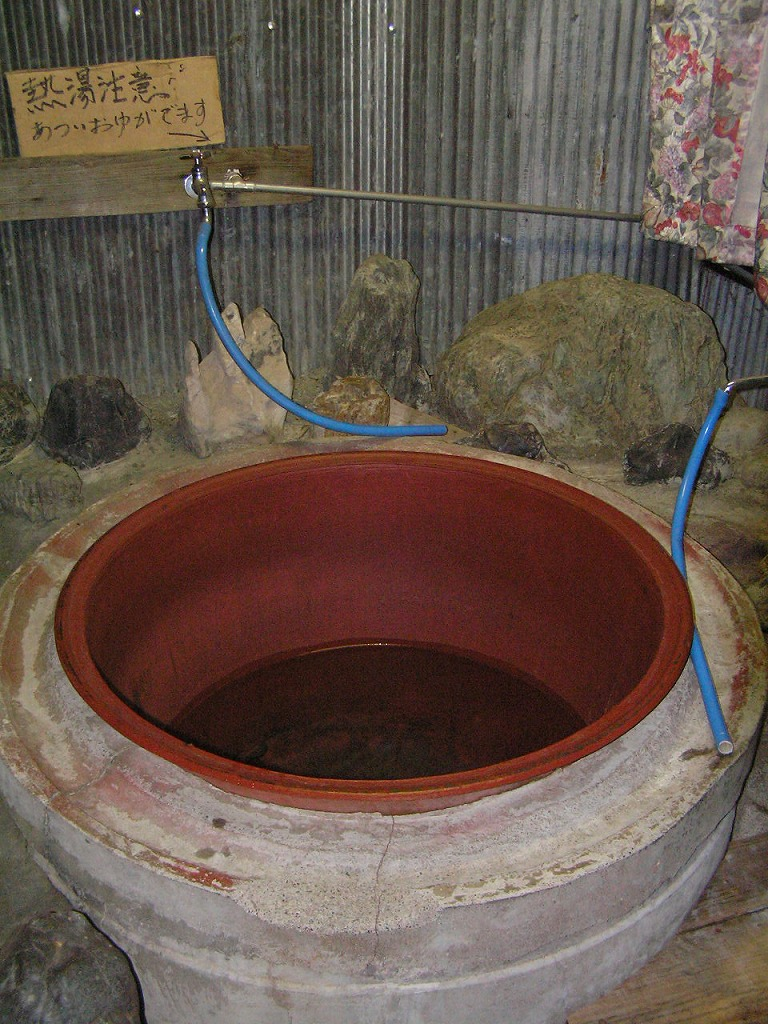
A goemonburo bathtub

Even the date of his death is uncertain, as some records say this took place in summer, while another dates it at October 8 (that is after middle of Japanese autumn). Before he died, Goemon wrote a famous farewell poem, saying that no matter what, thieves would always exist. A tombstone dedicated to him is located in Daiunin temple in Kyoto. A large iron kettle-shaped bathtub is now called a goemonburo ("Goemon bath").

== In drama ==
Ishikawa Goemon is the subject of many classic kabuki plays. The only one still in performance today is Kinmon Gosan no Kiri (The Golden Gate and the Paulownia Crest), a five-act play written by Namiki Gohei in 1778. The most famous act is "Sanmon Gosan no Kiri" ("The Temple Gate and the Paulownia Crest") in which Goemon is first seen sitting on top of the Sanmon gate at Nanzen-ji. He is smoking an oversized silver pipe called a kiseru and exclaims "The spring view is worth a thousand gold pieces, or so they say, but 'tis too little, too little. These eyes of Goemon rate it worth ten thousand!". Goemon soon learns that his father, a Chinese man named Sō Sokei, was killed by Mashiba Hisayoshi (a popular kabuki alias for Hideyoshi) and he sets off to avenge his father's death. He also appears in some versions of the famous Tale of the Forty-Seven Rōnin. In 1992, Goemon appeared in the kabuki series of Japanese postage stamps.

There are generally two ways in which Goemon has been most often portrayed in the modern popular culture: either a young, slender ninja, or a powerfully-built, hulking Japanese bandit. Goemon was a subject of several pre-WWII Japanese films such as Ishikawa Goemon Ichidaiki and Ishikawa Goemon no Hoji. He is a villain in Torawakamaru the Koga Ninja, and a tragic antagonist in Fukurō no Shiro (and in its remake Owls' Castle, played by Takaya Kamikawa). He is the subject of the Shinobi no Mono novels and film series, starring Ichikawa Raizō VIII as Goemon in the first three installments. In the third Shinobi no Mono film, known in English as Goemon Will Never Die, he escapes execution while another man is bribed to be boiled in his place. In the film Goemon, he is portrayed by Yōsuke Eguchi and depicted as Nobunaga's most faithful follower and as associated with Hattori Hanzō as well as Kirigakure Saizō and Sarutobi Sasuke of Sanada Ten Braves.

== See also ==
- Nezumi Kozō
- Robin Hood
- Ganbare Goemon
- Goemon Ishikawa XIII
