= Namiki Shōzō =

Namiki Shōzō may refer to:

- Namiki Shōzō I (1730–1773), a Japanese bunraku playwright
- Namiki Shōzō II (died 1807), a Japanese kabuki playwright
