= Revolving stage =

Rotating platform used in theatres

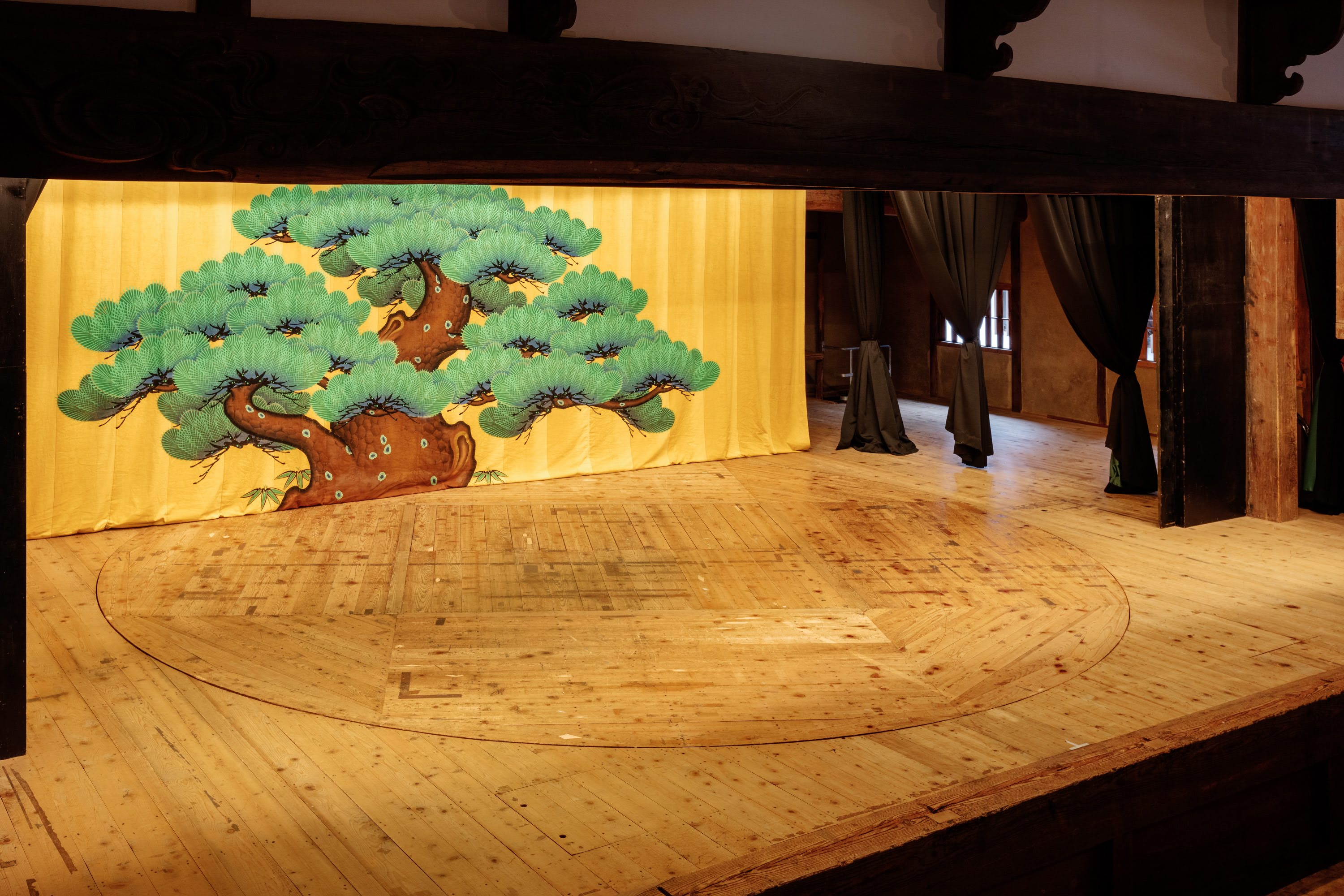
Revolving stage in the Murakuniza(ja:村国座), Gifu Prefecture of Japan

A revolving stage is a mechanically controlled platform within a theatre that can be rotated in order to speed up the changing of a scene within a show.

== Kabuki theatre development ==
=== Background ===
Kabuki theatre began in Japan around 1603 when Okuni, a Shinto priestess of the Izumi shrine, traveled with a group of priestesses to Kyoto to become performers. Okuni and her nuns danced sensualized versions of Buddhist and Shinto ritual dances, using the shows as a shop window for their services at night. They originally performed in the dry river bed of the River Kamo on a makeshift wooden stage, but as Okuni’s shows gained popularity they began to tour, performing at the imperial court at least once. Eventually, they were able to build a permanent theatre in 1604, modeled after Japan's aristocratic Nōh theatre which had dominated the previous era. Kabuki, with its origins in popular entertainment, drew crowds of common folk, along with high-class samurai looking to win their favorite performer for the night. This mixing of social classes troubled the Tokugawa Shogunate, who stressed the strict separation of different classes. When rivalries between Okuni’s samurai clients grew too intense, the shogunate took advantage of the conflict and banned women from performing onstage in 1629. The women were replaced by beautiful teenage boys who took part in the same after-dark activities, leading Kabuki to be banned from the stage completely in 1652. An actor-manager in Kyoto, Murayama Matabei, went to the authorities responsible and staged a hunger strike outside their offices. In 1654 Kabuki was allowed to return with restrictions. The shogunate declared that only adult men with “shaved pates” were allowed to perform, the shows must be fully acted plays and not variety shows, and actors had to remain in their own quarter of the city and refrain from mixing with the general public in their private life. With the dampened sensuality of Kabuki theatre, performers turned to exploiting art and spectacle to keep their audiences engaged.

The Genroku period of 1688 saw the solidification of the aesthetics of Kabuki under the new restrictions placed by the shogunate. Nōh theatre of the previous period was the theatre of aristocrats. After the embarrassment Kabuki brought to upper class society, it needed to develop into a more serious art form in order to survive. However, Kabuki theatre did not lose the influence of its origins as popular entertainment. A majority of the Kabuki repertoire was adapted from Bunraku puppet theatre, another popular entertainment of the same period. New innovations had to be made to adapt small scale puppet theatre into full scale plays, as well as elevate the source material to a higher class of art.

=== The Mawari-Butai ===
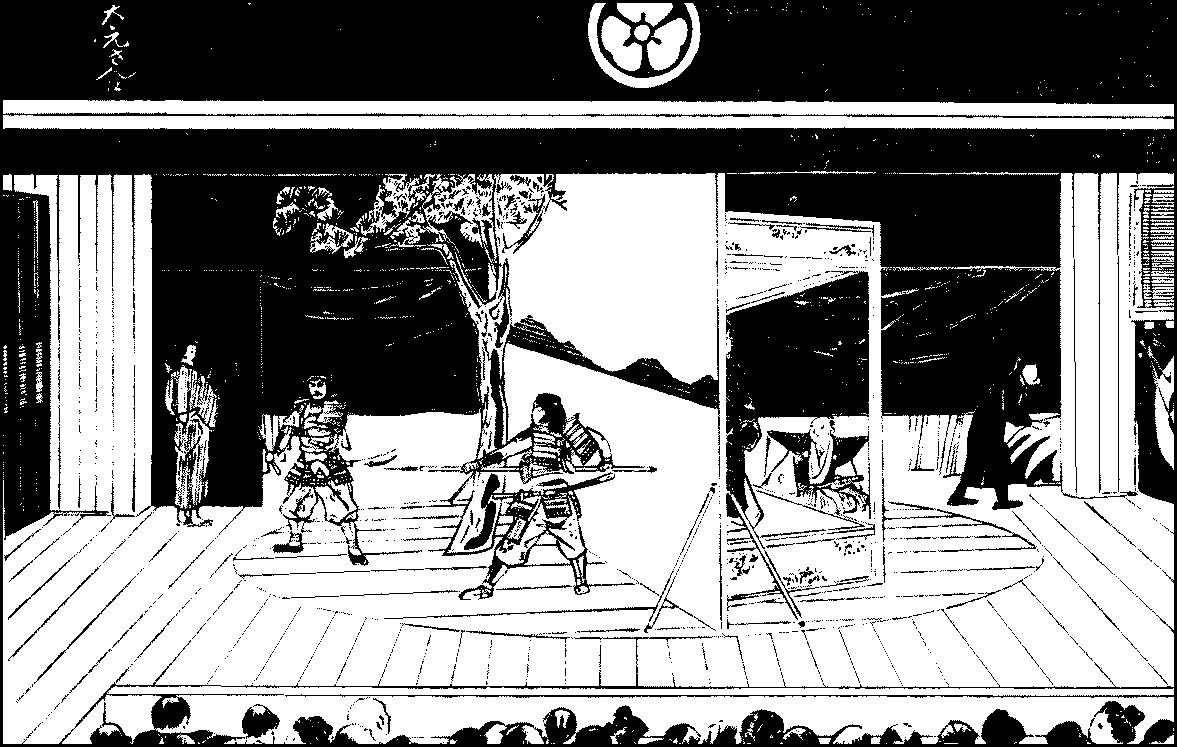
1910 illustration of a Japanese revolving stage

The revolving stage, called the mawari-butai, was invented by Osaka playwright Namiki Shozo in 1729 and solved the issue of moving heavy scenic properties quickly as Kabuki adopted Bunraku into full scale designs. The mawari-butai also served to capture the audience’s interest in the rambunctious theatre atmosphere. The mawari-butai was originally a raised mechanical platform that had to be operated manually by stage hands. The audience would have been able to see the stage hands turning the set as the action of the actors carried on continuously into the next scene. By the 1800s the mawari-butai had evolved to become flush with the stage, and to include an inner revolve and an outer revolve that could be spun simultaneously to achieve certain special effects. Stage hands now moved under stage, requiring the strength of at least four people to push the revolving stage to its next position. The mawari-butai in Kabuki theatre was always manually operated by stage hands.

The mawari-butai allowed great spectacle and ease of set changes, but it also provided a great opportunity for story and aesthetic choices. No more than two sets were constructed on the revolve. These sets could be entirely different settings or show a change in mood or time within one setting. By walking on the revolve in the opposite direction of its motion, actors could appear to go on long journeys through woods, down city streets, etc. The addition of the inner revolve allowed for set pieces to move in relation to each other. For example, two boats could sail past each other in an epic sea battle like in Chikamatsu Monzaemon’s The Girl From Hakata. The inner revolve sometimes was fitted with a lift that could be used to make set pieces rise from the floor, or to make buildings appear as if they are crashing down. The mawari-butai takes on a filmic effect and “fades the actor in and out of the realm of the performance”. Kabuki does not strive to be realistic, it strives to be a decorated space. Kabuki is first and foremost an actor’s theatre and asks the audience to suspend reality of setting, instead adapting to the conventions of Kabuki.

=== Japanese impact on the West ===
Following the Meiji Restoration in 1868, Japan ended a long period of isolation and reopened trade with European countries. After so long in isolation, Japanese art flooded the European market, sparking a great “Japonism” fever. The conventions of Japanese Kabuki theatre developed in isolation from the rest of the world, so the innovations quickly spread to European theatre. Karl Lautenschlager built the first revolving stage in western theatre in 1896 for Mozart’s Don Giovanni at the Residenz Theatre. This revolving stage was raised slightly above the stage level and was electrically powered by motors that turned wheels along a track. With the proscenium arch, only a quarter of the revolve was visible to the audience. Four sets were constructed on Lautenschlager’s revolving stage as opposed to Kabuki’s limit of two. In 1889 Lautenschlager was hired by the Munich court theatre to design an efficient revolving stage for productions of Shakespeare. Here marks the greatest role of the revolving stage in its western history as the new Shakespeare stage. The revolving stage trickled into the designs of Germany and Russia’s Reinhardt and Meyerhold as its popularity grew. Revolving stages are still a fixture of both Kabuki theatre and western theatre today. The automation of the revolving stage and lifts has allowed many more aesthetic possibilities in shows such as Cats and Les Miserable, as well as the automated double revolve, or concentric revolve, in Hamilton, further solidifying these Kabuki innovations into the western mainstream.

Ten years after Lautenschlager’s stage, Max Reinhardt employed it in the premiere of Frühlings Erwachen by Frank Wedekind. Soon this revolving stage was a trend in Berlin. Another adaptation of the Kabuki stage popular among German directors was the Blumensteg, a jutting extension of the stage into the audience. The European acquaintance with Kabuki came either from travels in Japan or from texts, but also from Japanese troupes touring Europe. In 1893, Kawakami Otojiro and his troupe of actors arrived in Paris, returning again in 1900 and playing in Berlin in 1902. Kawakami's troop performed two pieces, Kesa and Shogun, both of which were westernized and were performed without music and with the majority of the dialogue eliminated. This being the case, these performances tended toward pantomime and dance. Dramatists and critics quickly latched on to what they saw as a "re-theatricalization of the theater." Among the actors in these plays was Sada Yacco, first Japanese star in Europe, who influenced pioneers of modern dance such as Loie Fuller and Isadora Duncan, she performed for Queen Victoria in 1900, and enjoyed the status of a European star.

== Present-day use ==
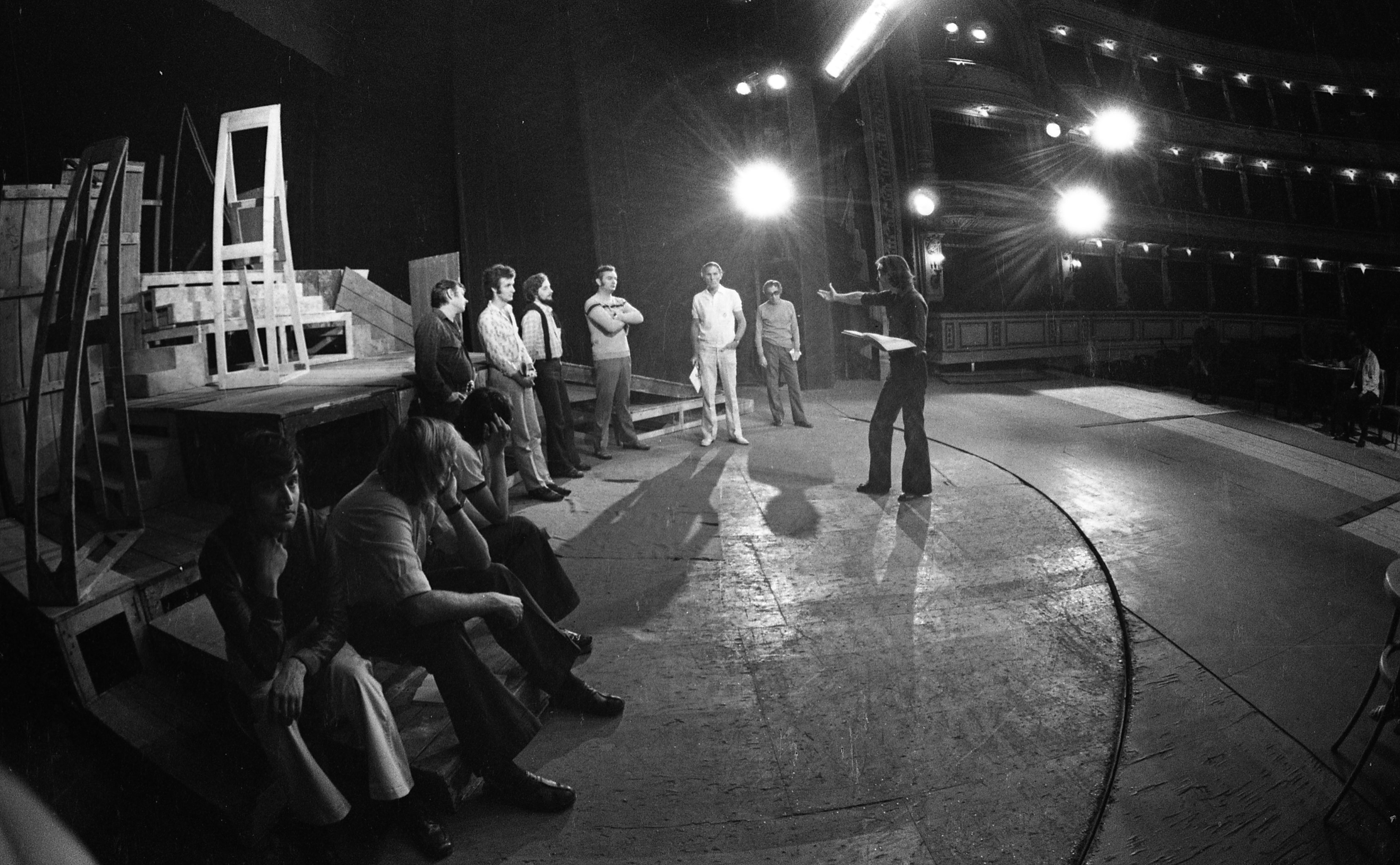
Actors on a revolving stage at the National Theatre of Szeged in 1974

Revolving stages are still in use in theater, but benefit from the rise of automation in scenic design. The use of a revolving stage in the original staging of Cats was considered revolutionary at the time, with a section of the stalls mounted onto the revolve as well. The original London staging of Les Misérables is one of the most notable modern uses of a revolving stage, considered "iconic"; it made sixty-three rotations in each performance. Director Trevor Nunn's decision to use the feature was informed by the need for rapid changes of location, especially in light of scenes added to the musical in its adaptation from the original French version. The turntable also provided "cinematic" changes of perspective on a scene, and, crucially, permitted the cast to walk against the revolve for dramatic motion. Double-rotating stages, known as a concentric revolve, have also been used in theater productions such as Hamilton. Having one revolving stage inside of the other allows for more flexibility by allowing each to rotate in different directions or at different speeds. Some combine this technology with stage lifts to allow the concentric rings to not only rotate at different speeds, but at different heights, such as those used in Hadestown.

== Other uses ==
Today revolving stages are primarily used in marketing and trade shows and constructed in a modular design that can be set up and taken down quickly in different types of venues. Driven from the central core or indirectly from an external hub, these stages take advantage of rotating ring couplers to provide rotating power to the stage deck so there is no twisting of power cords or need to reverse the stage. In many cases the stage is left rotating for days at a time, carrying a load up to an SUV.

The revolving stage is also sometimes used at concerts and music festivals, especially larger ones, to allow one band to set up and check their equipment while another opening band is performing. This allows for a much faster transition between an opening band and the next one on the lineup. One such example was the Goose Lake International Music Festival, held in Michigan in August, 1970.

A notable revolving stage show that is used for the concept for Walt Disney's Carousel of Progress in Tomorrowland at Magic Kingdom in Walt Disney World Resort in Bay Lake, Florida just outside of Orlando, Florida, where the stage remains stationary while the auditorium revolves around it.

== See also ==
- Stagecraft
