= Namiki Gohei =

Namiki Gohei may refer to:

- Namiki Gohei I (1747-1808), prolific kabuki playwright and actor
- Namiki Gohei II (1768-1819), kabuki playwright best known for the dance Yasuna, disciple of Gohei I
- Namiki Gohei III (1789-1855), kabuki playwright best known for the play Kanjinchō, disciple of Gohei II
- Namiki Gohei IV (1829-1901), kabuki playwright, disciple and son of Gohei III
