= Sanmon Gosan no Kiri =

Sanmon Gosan no Kiri 樓門五山桐
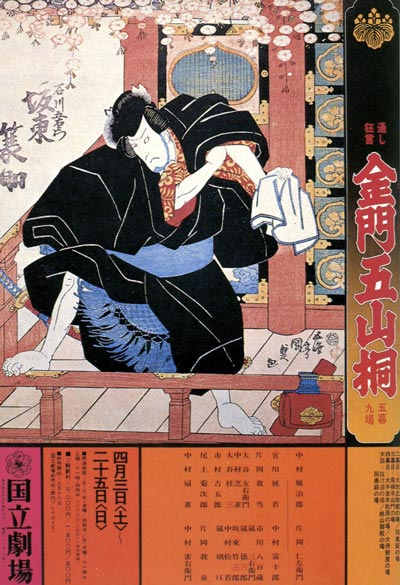
- Poster of the production of "Kinmon Gosan no Kiri" staged in April 1976 at the National Theatre
- Written by: Namiki Gohei I
- Characters: Ishikawa Goemon, Hashiba Hideyoshi
- Original language: Japanese
- Genre: jidaimono
- Setting: Nanzen-ji, Kyoto

Premiere
- Date premiered: April 1778, Kado no Shibai, Osaka
- Place premiered: Japan

Sanmon Gosan no Kiri (樓門五山桐), or The Golden Gate and the Paulownia Crest, is a kabuki play written by Namiki Gohei I and first performed in 1778.

Originally part of an all-day, five-act jidaimono play called Kinmon Gosan no Kiri ("The Golden Gate and the Paulownia Crest"), only the "Sanmon" scene is currently performed. It is also the only part translated into English.

Unlike many other plays from the Edo period, often adapted from bunraku or noh, Sanmon Gosan no Kiri was written directly for kabuki. It was premiered by the Ōgawa Kichitarō I troupe at the Kado no Shibai theater in Osaka, in the fourth month of 1778. The original cast included Arashi Hinasuke I in the role of Goemon, and Onoe Kikugorô I in the role of Hisayoshi (the kabuki alias for the famous daimyō Toyotomi Hideyoshi).

== Characters ==
- Ishikawa Goemon - a notorious thief
- Mashiba Hisayoshi - a powerful general, enemy of Goemon
- Soldiers
- Stage assistants
- Ōzatsuma - the narrator and shamisen player

== Plot ==
Events take place at the sanmon ("main gate") of the Nanzen-ji zen buddhist temple in Kyoto.

== Translation ==
The play was translated into English by Alan Cummings in Kabuki Plays on Stage II: Villainy and Vengeance, 1773-1799, edited by James R. Brandon and Samuel L. Leiter and published in 2002.

- Kabuki Plays on Stage II: Villainy and Vengeance, 1773-1799. (2002) University of Hawaii Press, ISBN 978-0-824-82455-6.
