= Nanzen-ji =

Zen Buddhist Temple in Kyoto, Japan

Nanzen-ji 南禅寺
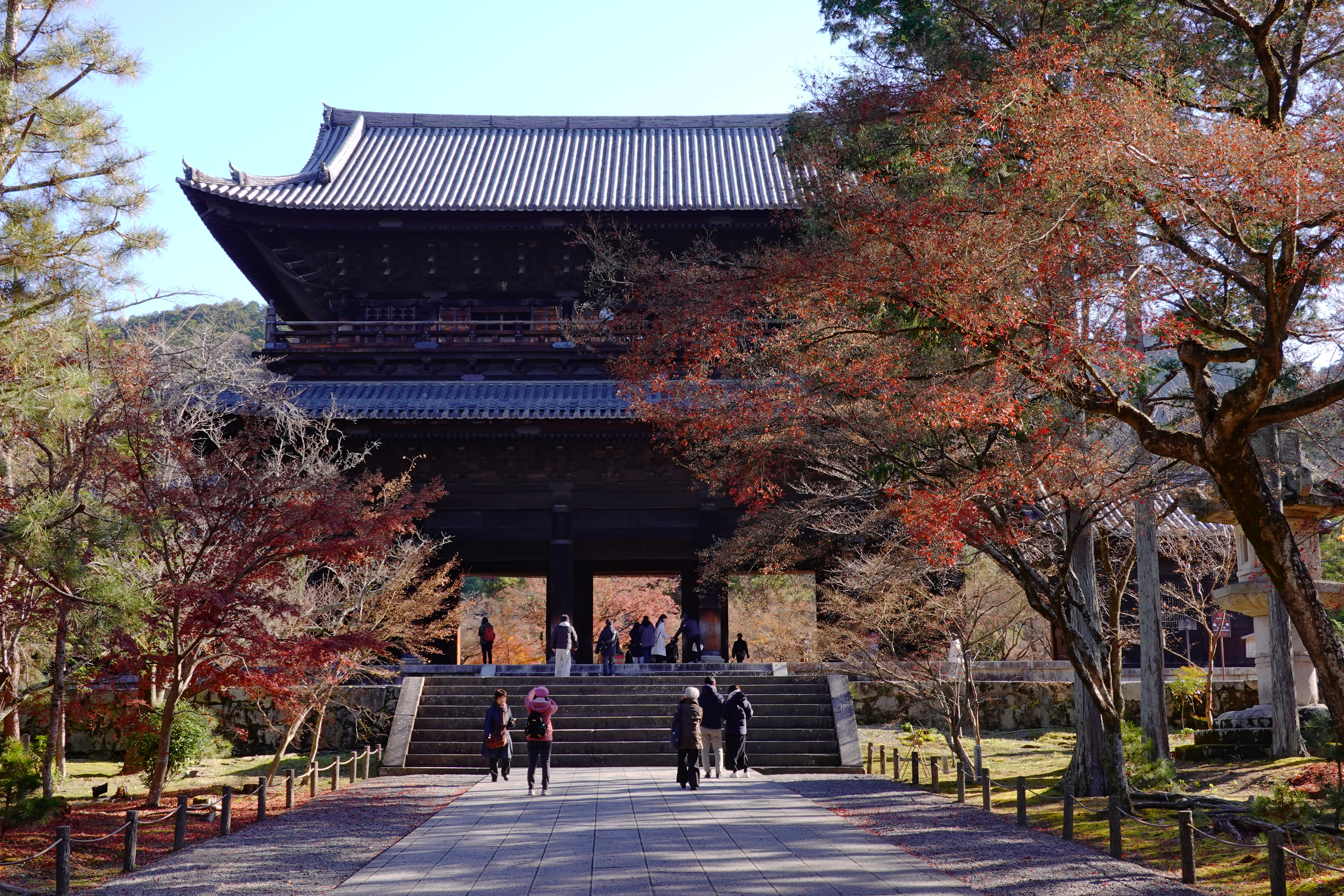
- The sanmon

Religion
- Affiliation: Nanzen-ji Rinzai
- Deity: Shaka Nyorai (Śākyamuni)
- Status: Head Temple

Location
- Location: 86 Nanzenji Fukuchichō, Sakyō-ku, Kyoto, Kyoto Prefecture
- Country: Japan
- Interactive map of Nanzen-ji 南禅寺
- Coordinates: 35°0′43.14″N 135°47′39.8″E

Architecture
- Founder: Emperor Kameyama and Mukan Fumon
- Completed: 1909 (Reconstruction)

Website
- www.nanzen.net/english/index.html

Nanzen-ji (南禅寺; Japanese pronunciation: [naꜜn.dzeɲ.dʑi]), or Zuiryusan Nanzen-ji, formerly Zenrin-ji (禅林寺, Zenrin-ji), is a Zen Buddhist temple in Kyoto, Japan. Emperor Kameyama established it in 1291 on the site of his previous detached palace. It is also the headquarters of the Nanzen-ji branch of Rinzai Zen. The precincts of Nanzen-ji are a nationally designated Historic Site and the Hōjō gardens a Place of Scenic Beauty. The temple was destroyed in a fire in 1895 and rebuilt in 1909.

== History ==
Nanzen-ji was founded in the middle Kamakura period (1291, or Shōō 4 in the Japanese era system). It was destroyed by fire in 1393, 1447, and 1467, rebuilt in 1597, and expanded in the Edo era. A large complex, it has varied over time between nine and twelve sub-temples.

Zenkei Shibayama, who provided a popular commentary on the Mumonkan, was an abbot of the monastery.

== Significance in Zen Buddhism ==
Nanzen-ji is not itself considered one of the "five great Zen temples of Kyoto"; however, it does play an important role in the "Five Mountain System" which was modified from Chinese roots. Tenryū-ji (天龍寺, Tenryū-ji) is considered to be one of the so-called Kyoto Gozan (京都五山, Kyōto gozan) or "five great Zen temples of Kyoto", along with Shōkoku-ji (相国寺, Shōkoku-ji), Kennin-ji (建仁寺, Kennin-ji), Tōfuku-ji (東福寺, Tōfuku-ji), and Manju-ji (満寿寺, Manju-ji). The head temple presiding over the Gozan in Kyoto is Nanzen-ji. After the completion of Shōkoku-ji by Ashikaga Yoshimitsu in 1386, a new ranking system was created with Nanzen-ji at the top and in a class of its own. Nanzen-ji had the title of "First Temple of The Land" and played a supervising role.

Nanzen-ji
	Kyoto	Kamakura
First Rank	Tenryū-ji	Kenchō-ji
Second Rank	Shōkoku-ji	Engaku-ji
Third Rank	Kennin-ji	Jufuku-ji
Fourth Rank	Tōfuku-ji	Jōchi-ji
Fifth Rank	Manju-ji	Jōmyō-ji

== Notable structures ==
=== Sanmon ===
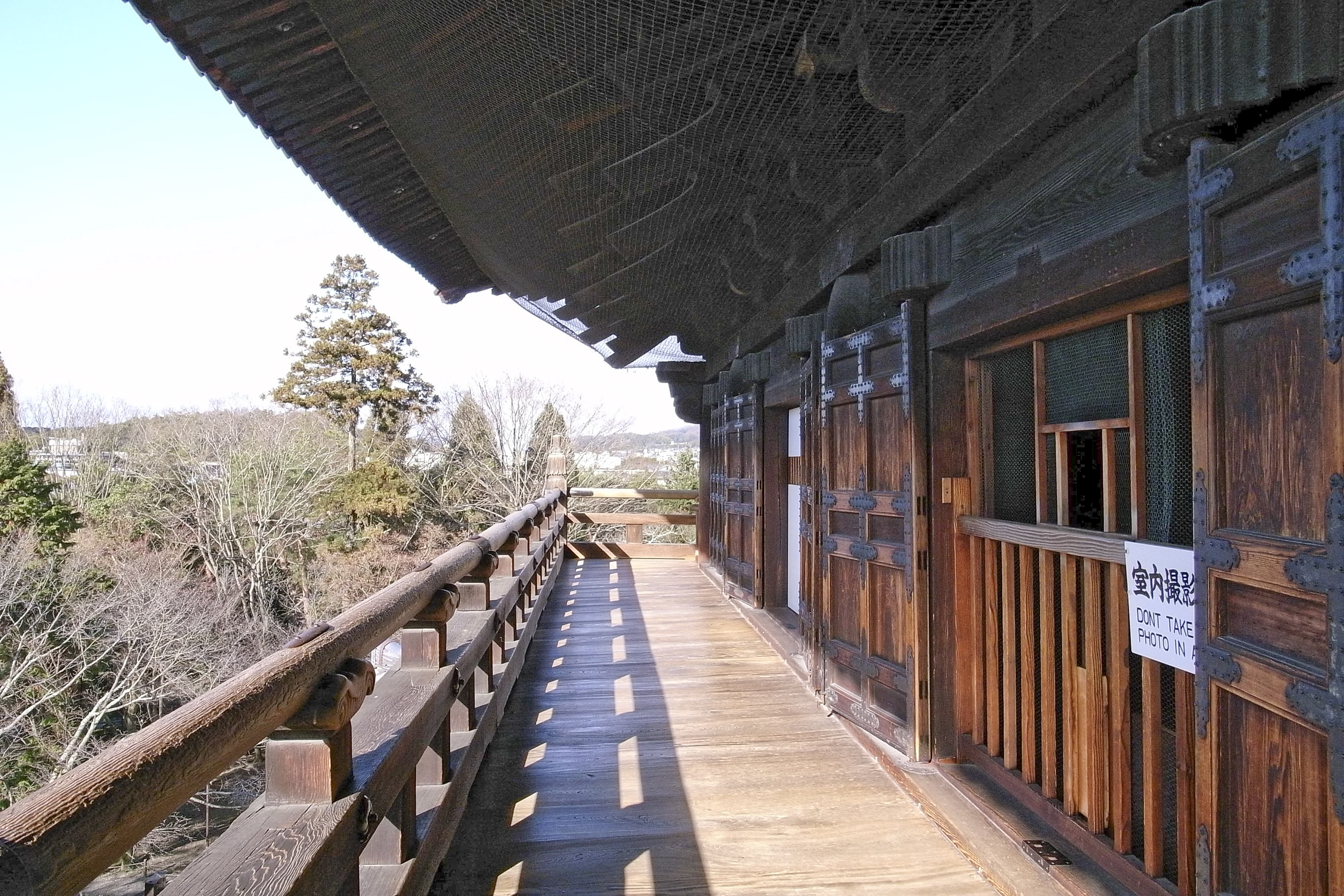
View from the second story of the Nanzen-ji Sanmon

The temple's Sanmon gate was originally constructed in the 13th century, destroyed in 1369 at the order of the government, and reconstructed in 1628. The gate contains stairs to an elevated viewing area, which was the setting for a famous scene in the 1778 Kabuki play Sanmon Gosan no Kiri inspired by the story of the criminal Ishikawa Goemon who is said to have spoken of the beauty of the view (but who was executed prior to the construction of the current gate).

=== Hōjō ===
The hōjō (abbot's quarters) of Nanzen-ji is notable both for its gardens and its art.

The garden of the hōjō is considered one of the most significant examples of karesansui gardens (rock gardens), and was built in the 1600s by Kobori Enshu. The garden mirrors natural forms, and is seventy percent gravel. It has been designated a national Place of Scenic Beauty.

The hōjō itself, also known as the Seiryo-den, was given to the temple by the Emperor Go-Yōzei. It contains a variety of important screen paintings on gold backgrounds, including two of tigers by Kanō Tan'yū. It has been designated a National Treasure.

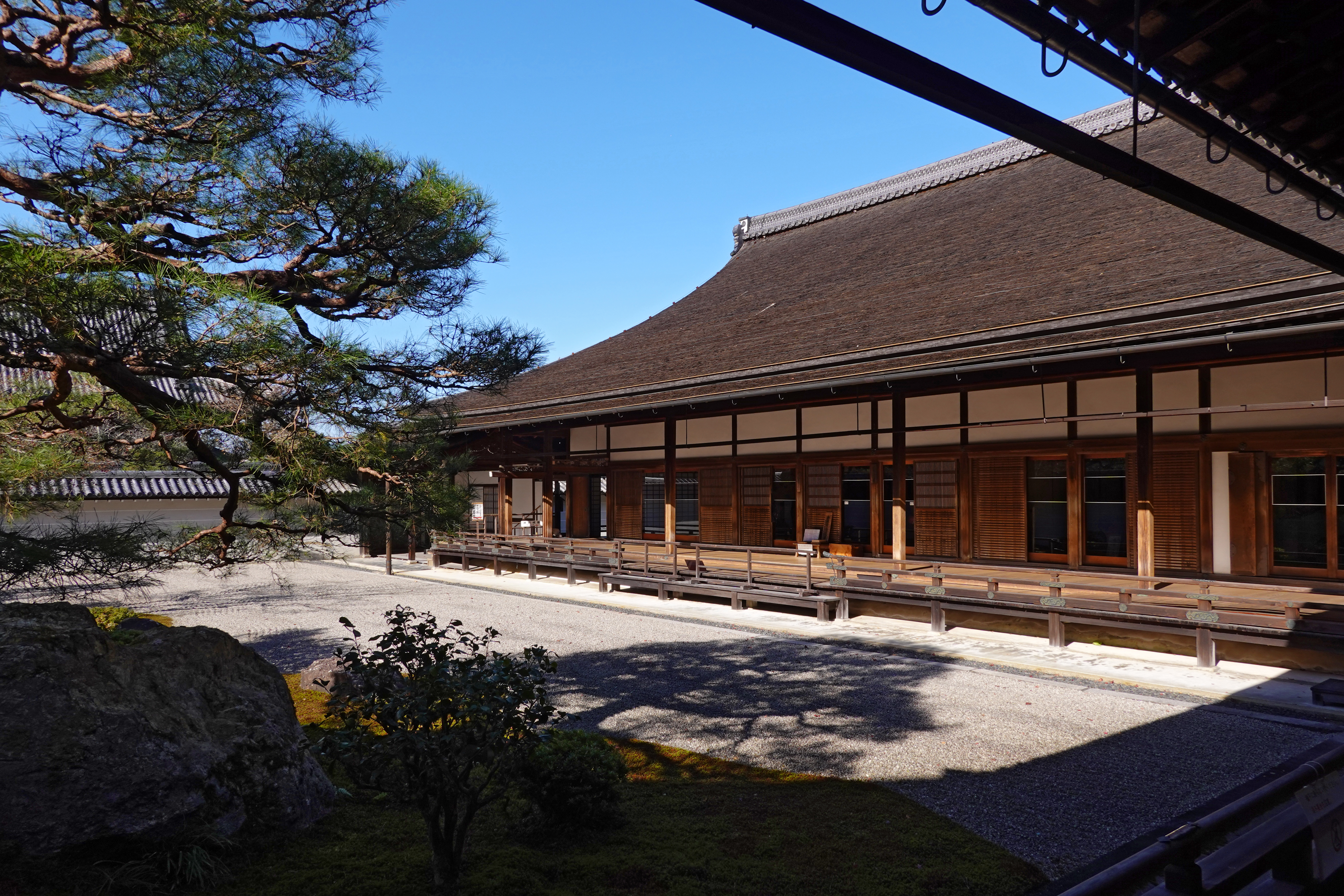
The Hōjō

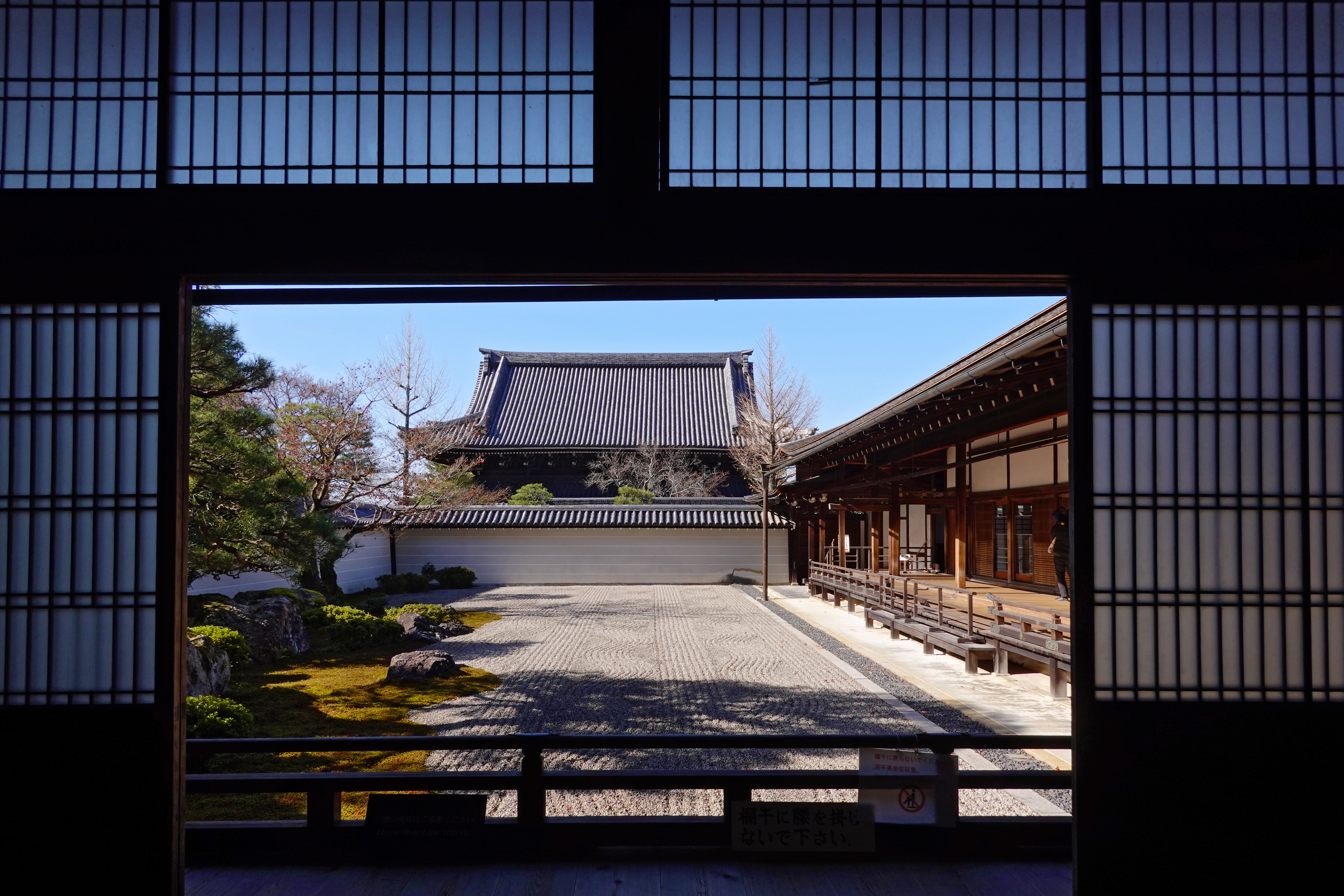
The Hōjō garden

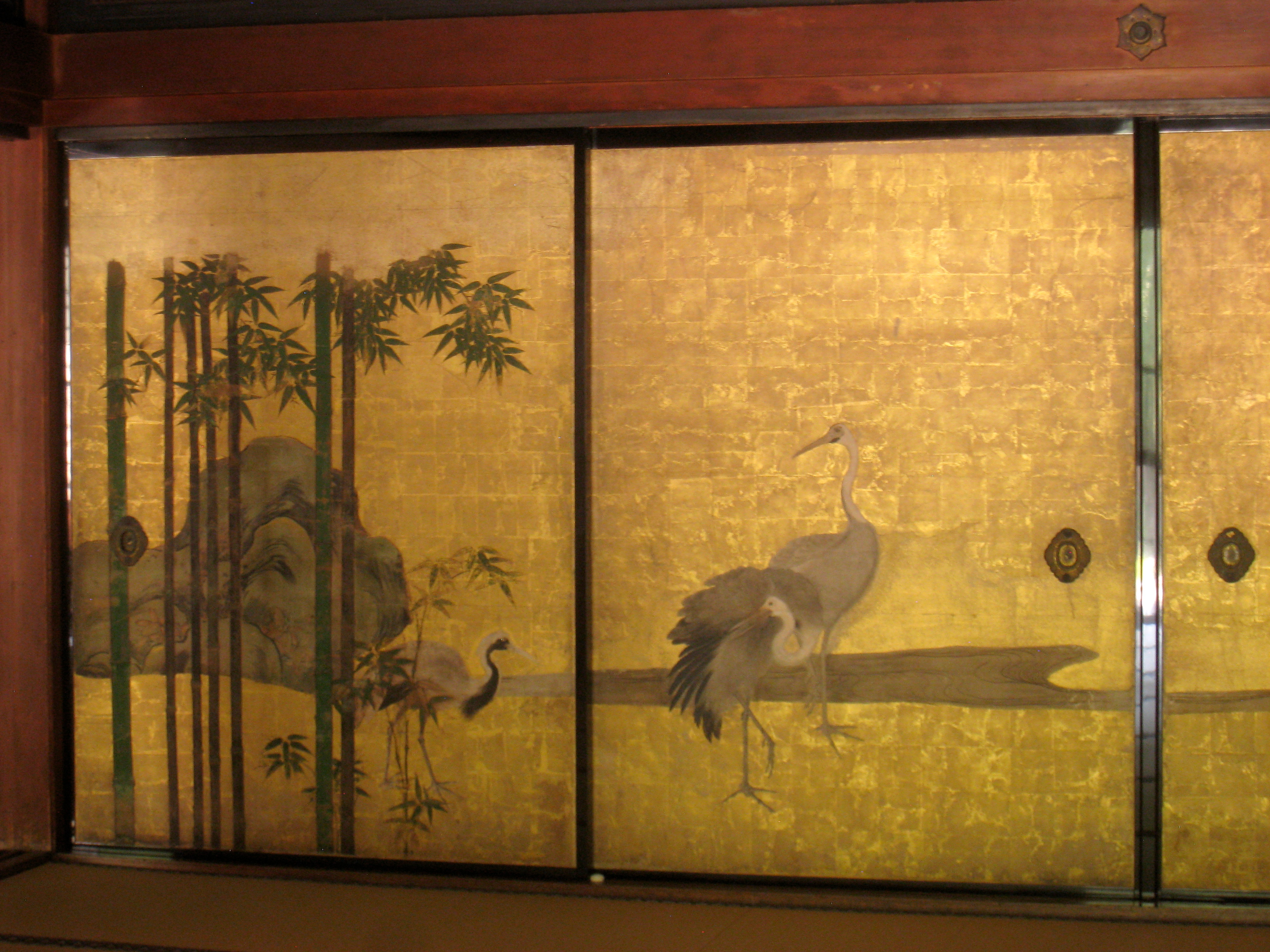
Crane paintings from inside the Hōjō

=== Nanzen-ji Aqueduct ===
Constructed in 1890 through the temple grounds to carry irrigation water from the Lake Biwa Canal.

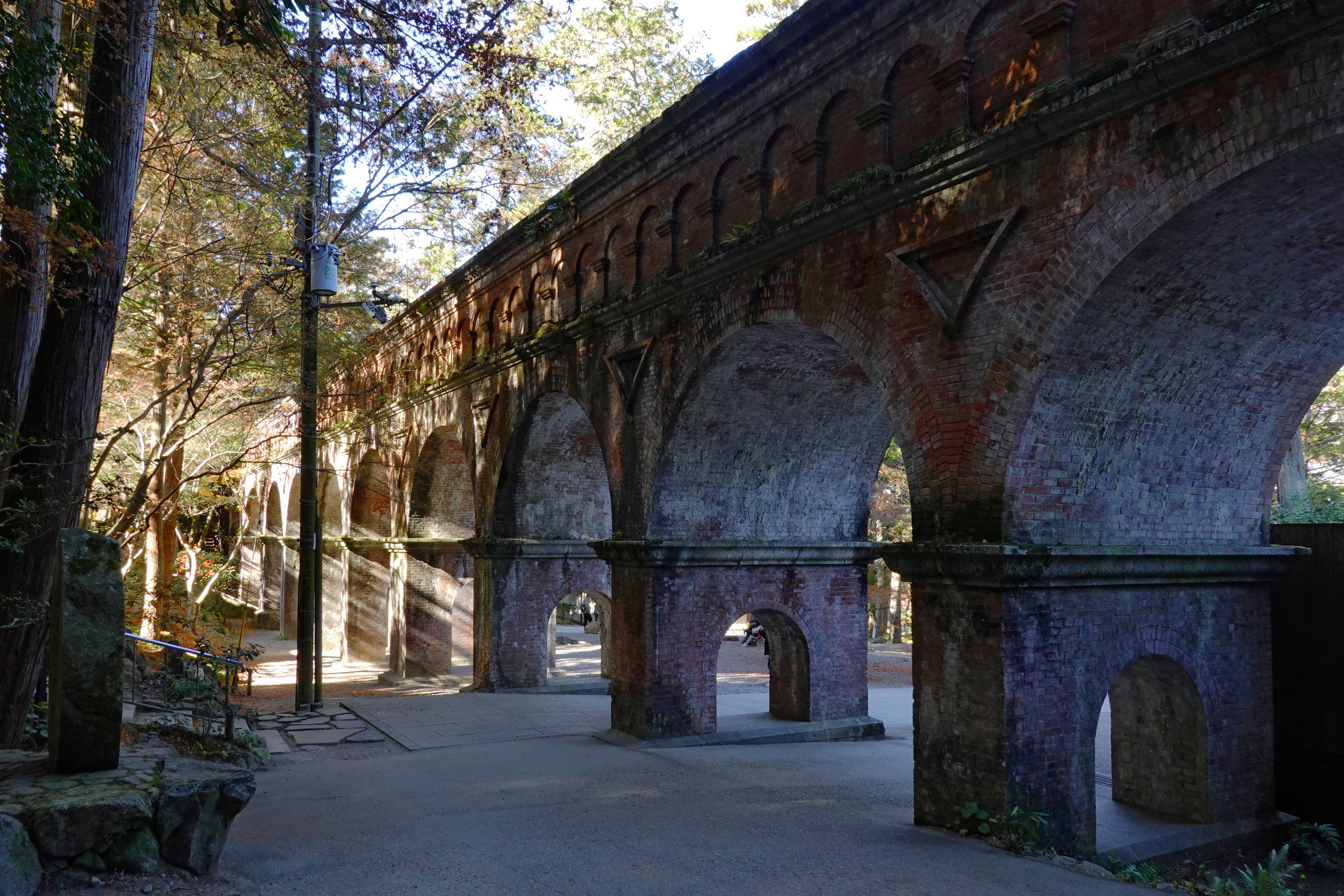

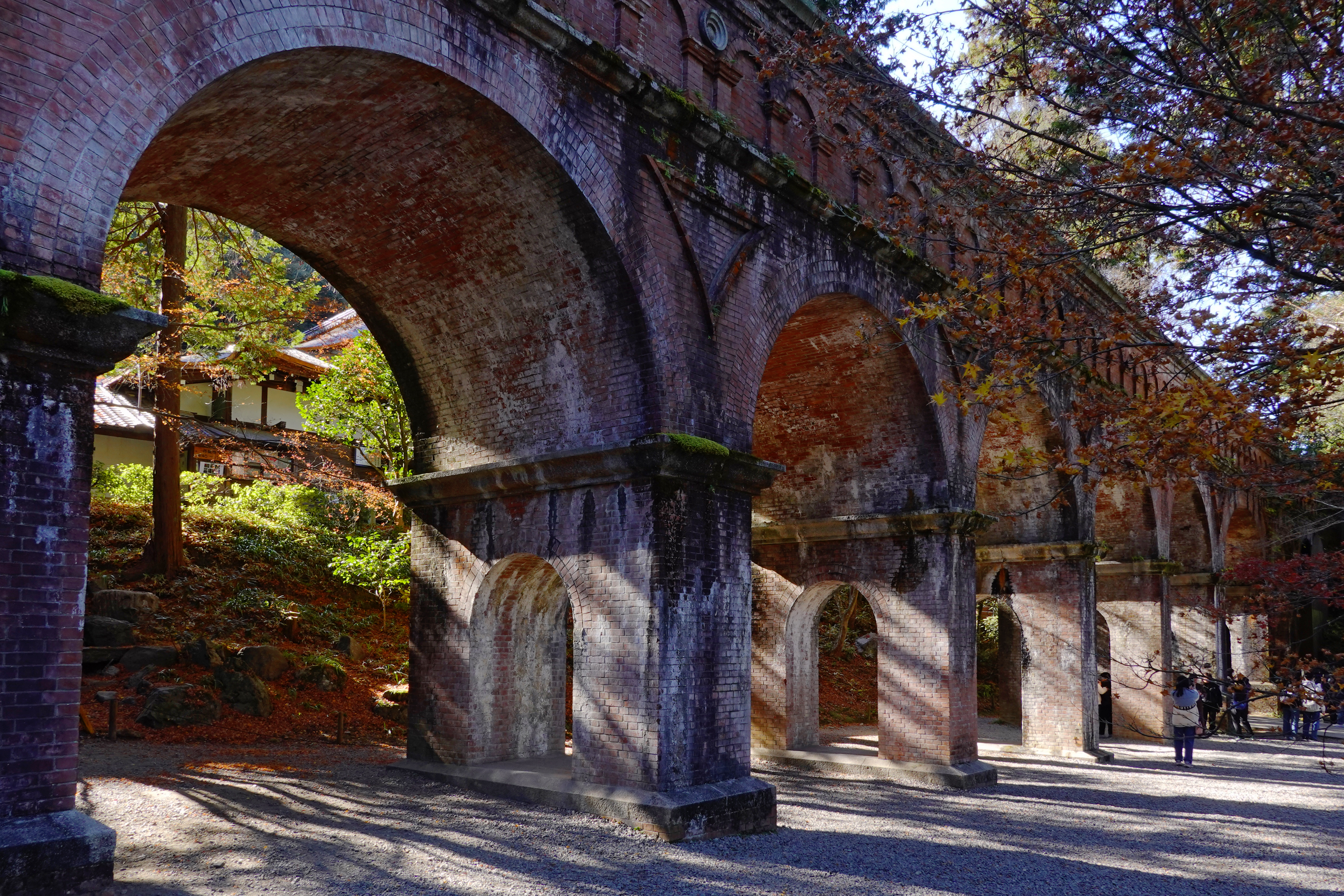

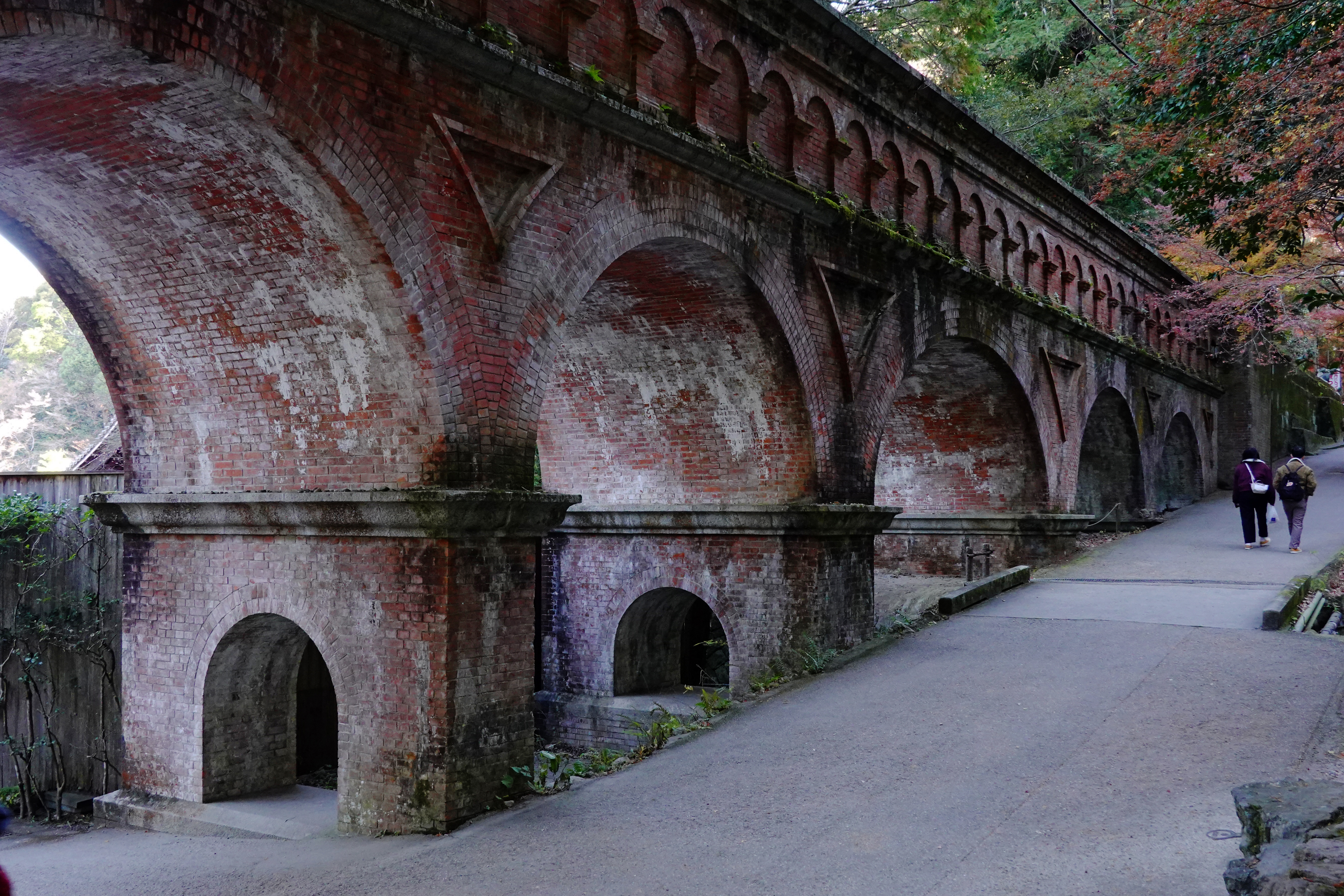

== In media ==
Parts of the 2003 film Lost in Translation were filmed there.

== Gallery ==
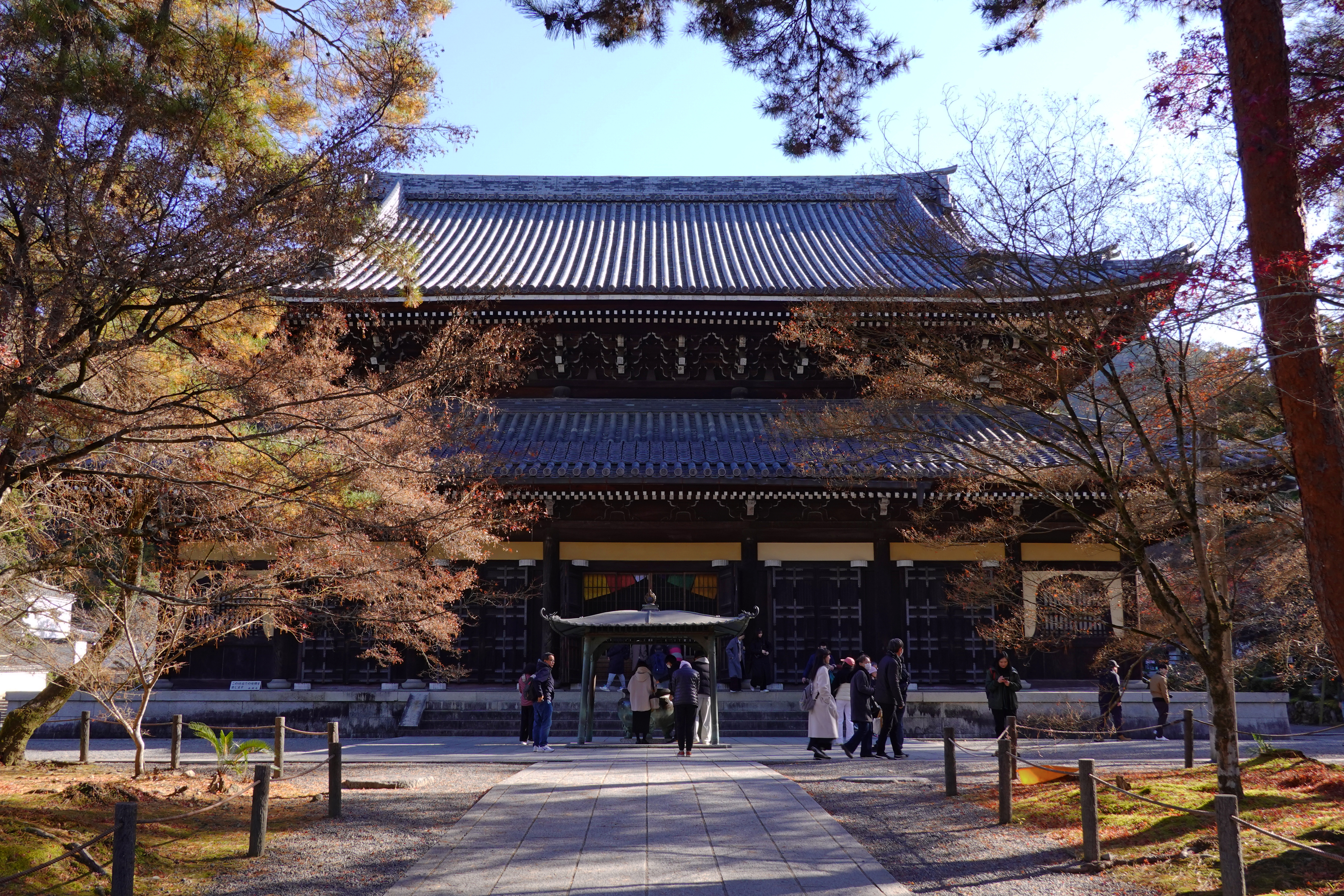
Hattō

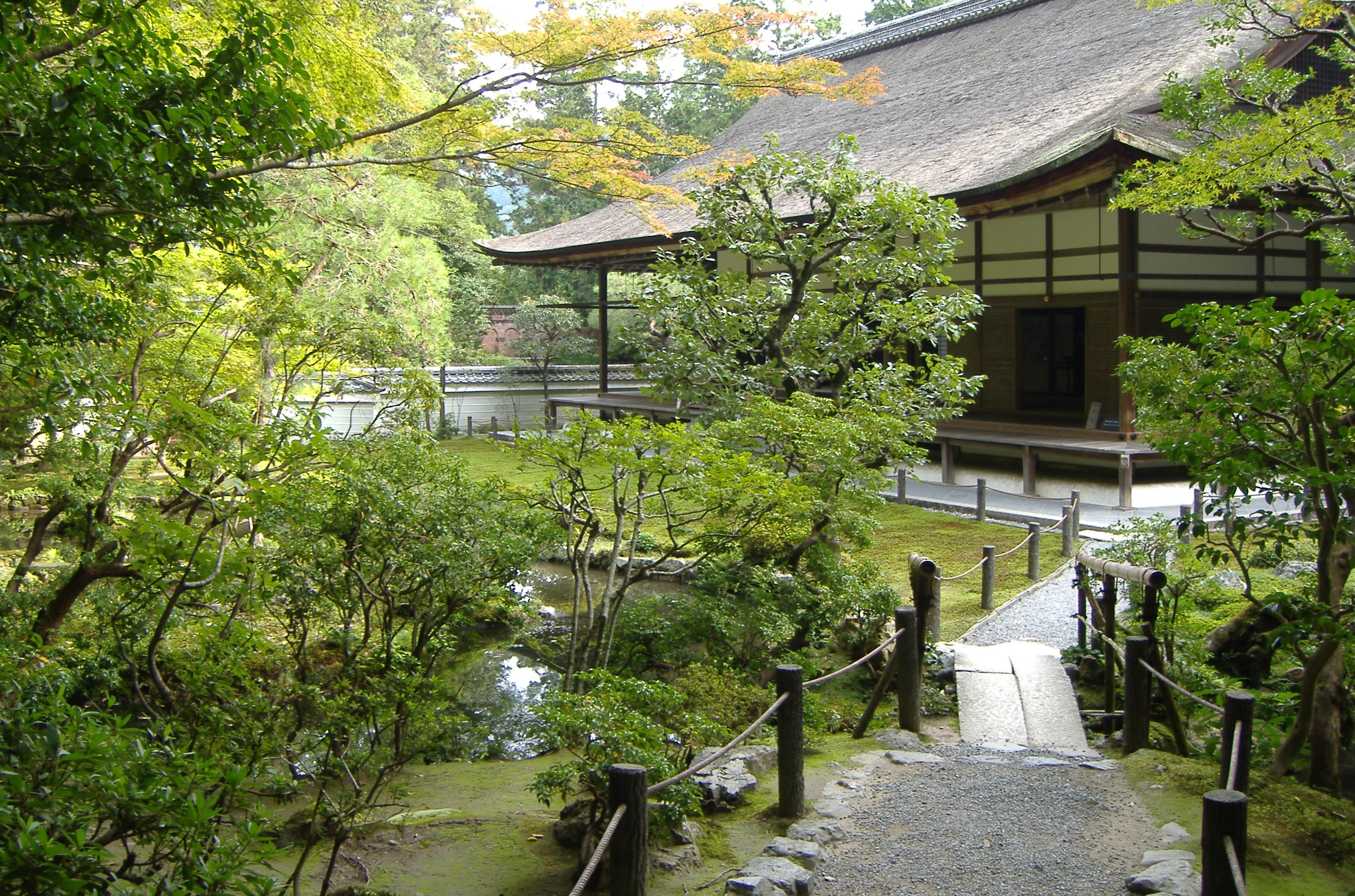
Nanzen-in

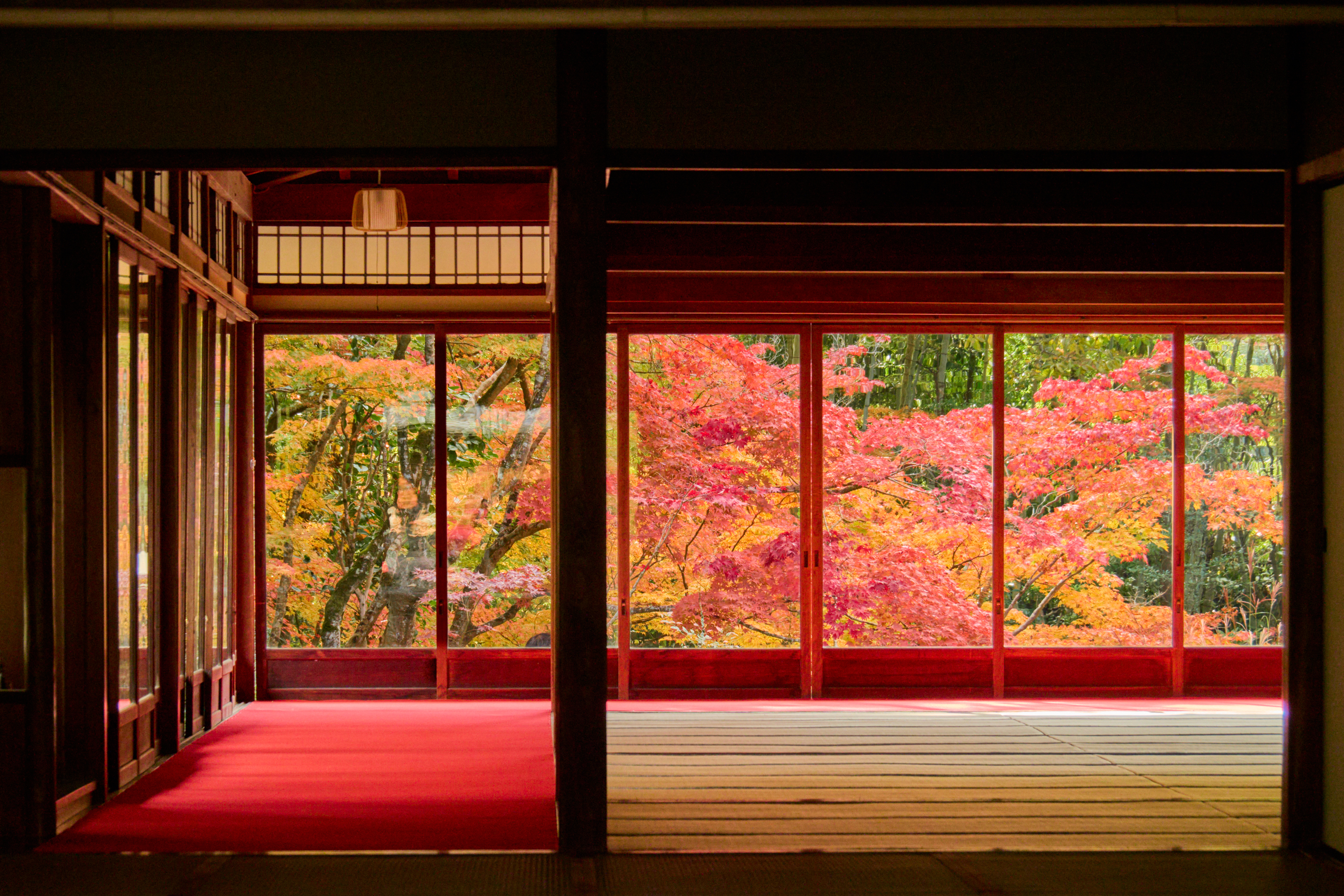
Autumn views from Tenjuan Temple, Nanzen-ji

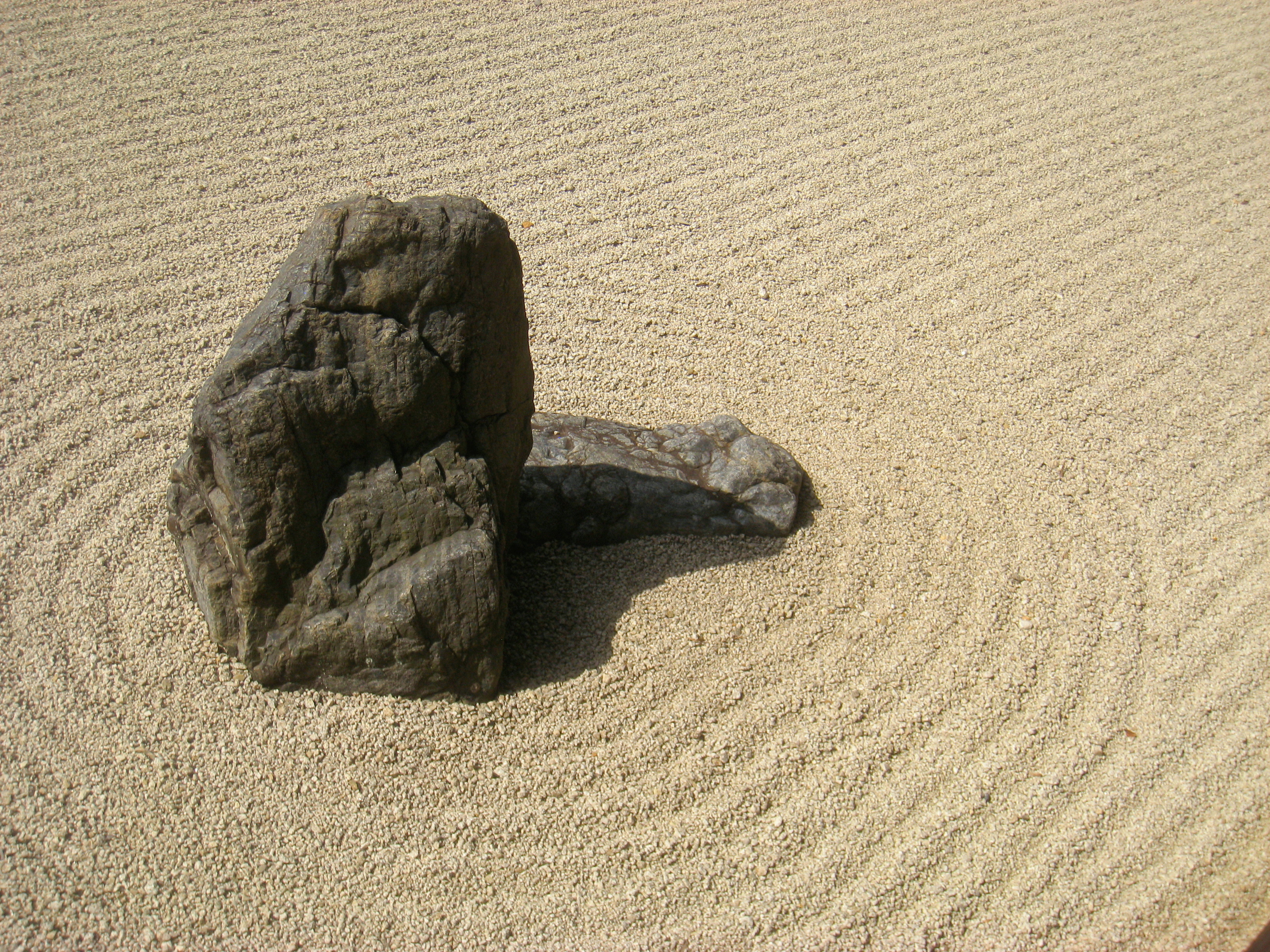
Small Hōjō garden

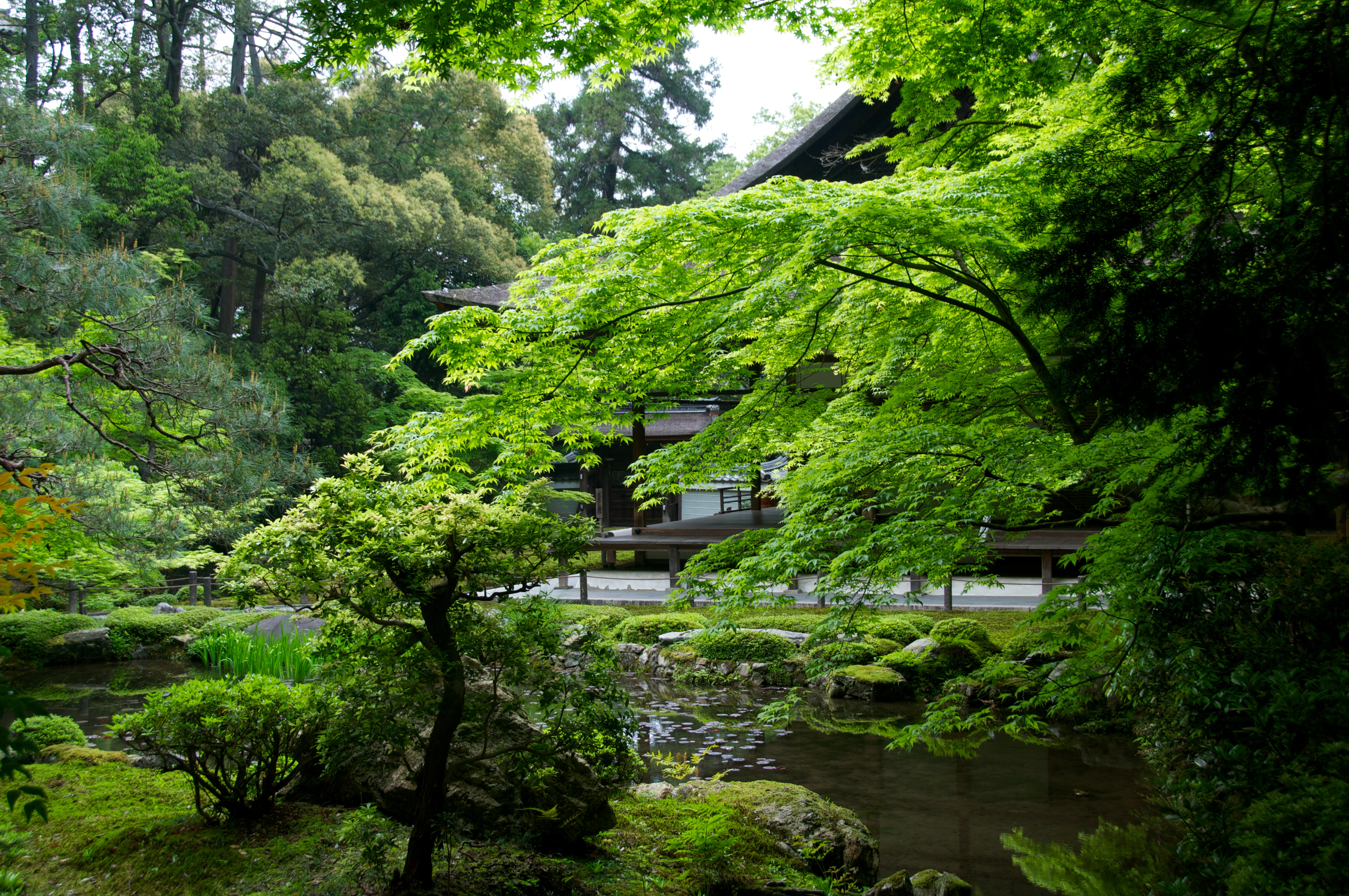
Another part of the complex

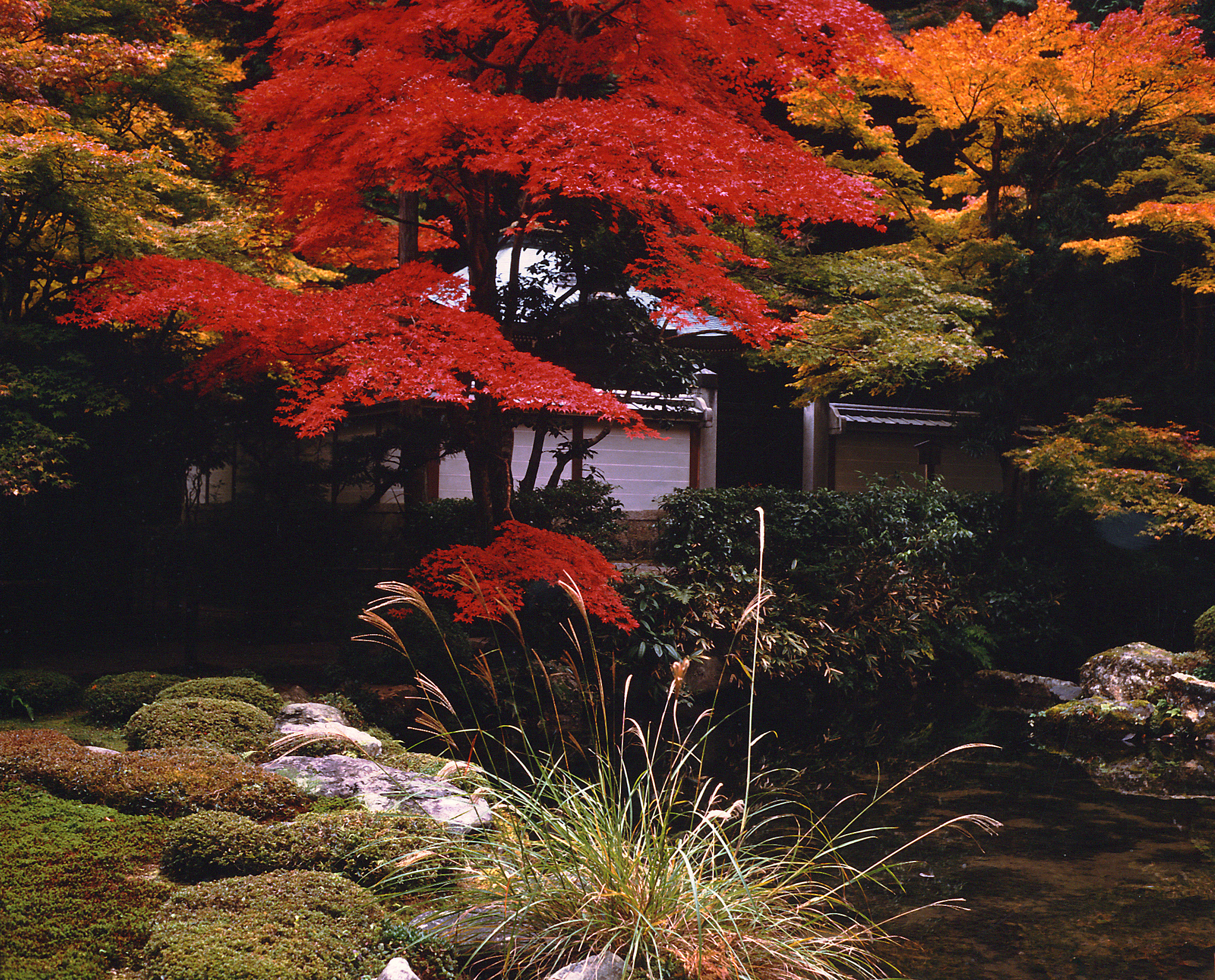
In the fall

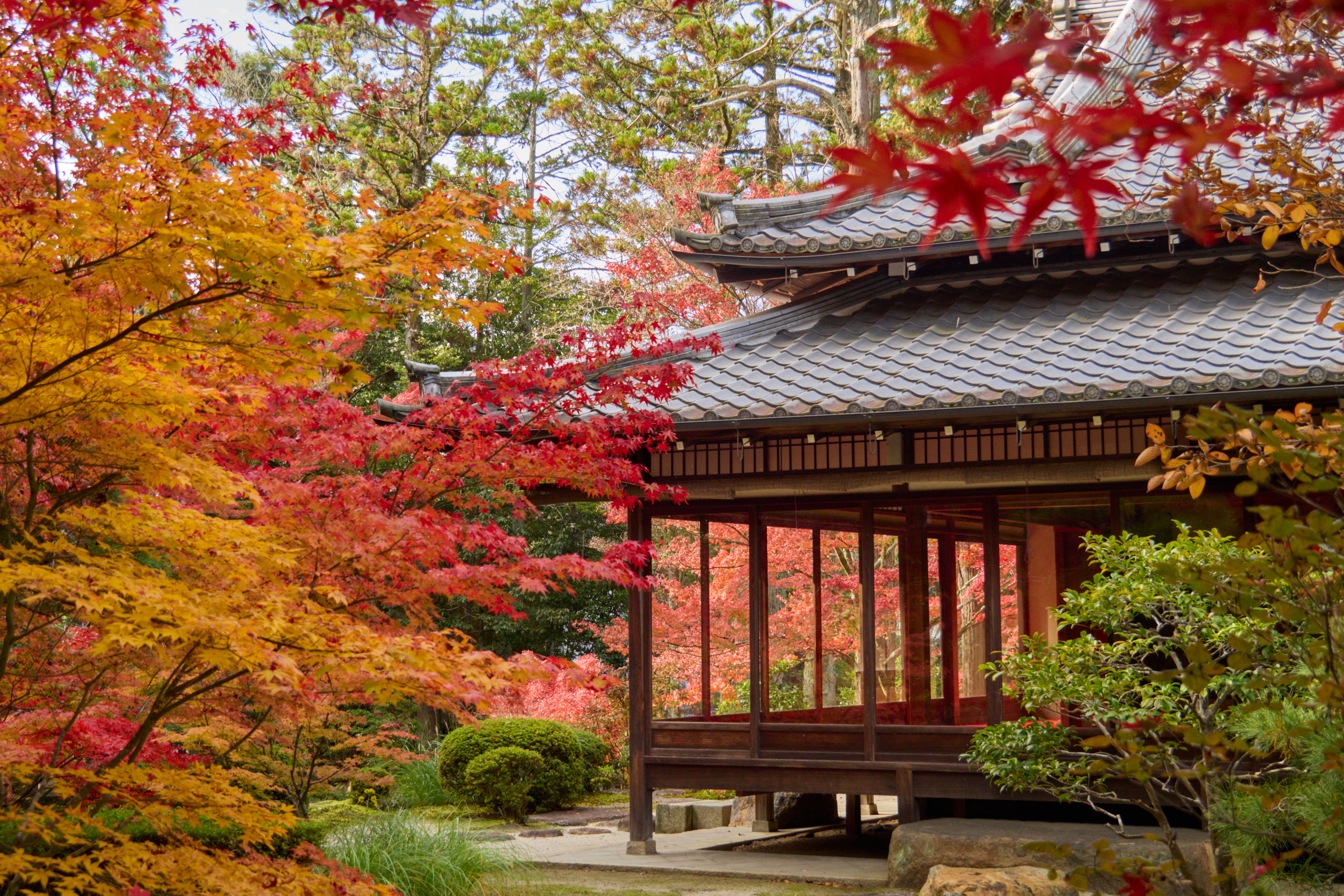
Tenjuan Temple, Nanzen-ji, in autumn.

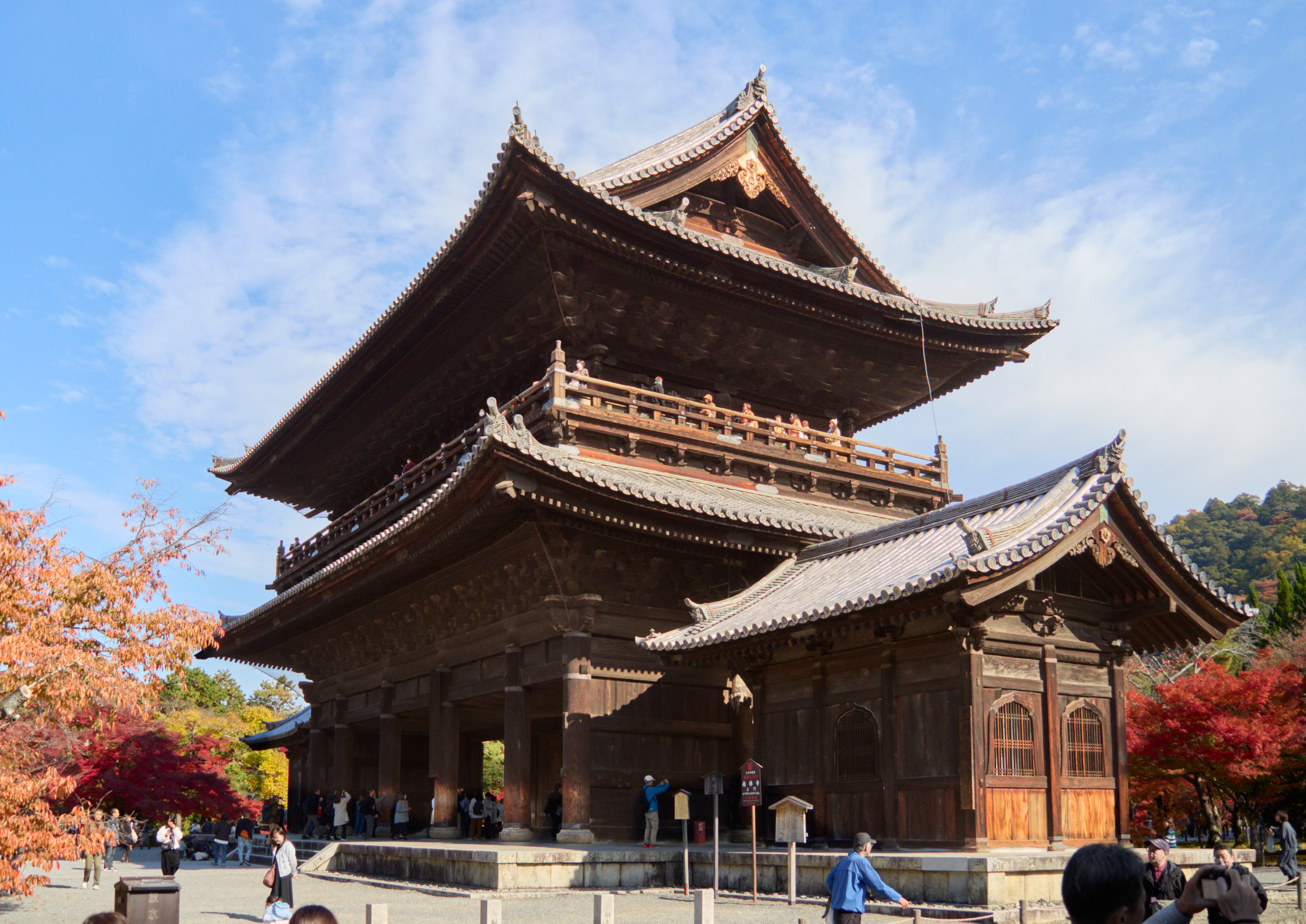
Sanmon Gate

== See also ==
- Ishikawa Goemon
- List of Buddhist temples in Kyoto
- List of National Treasures of Japan (temples)
- List of National Treasures of Japan (ancient documents)
