= Shozo Tominaga =

Japanese war criminal

- 富永 正三
- Born: 1914 or 1915
- Died: January 13, 2002
- Education: Imperial Japanese Army Academy
- Military career
- Allegiance: Empire of Japan
- Branch: Imperial Japanese Army
- Unit: 39th Division
- Conflicts: Second Sino-Japanese War; World War II; Soviet invasion of Manchuria (POW)
- Other work: Peace activist

Shozo Tominaga (富永 正三, Tominaga Shōzō; 1914 or 1915 – January 13, 2002) was a Japanese convicted war criminal turned peace activist.

Tominaga served in Manchuria during the Second Sino-Japanese War, in which he participated in multiple war crimes. He served with the 39th Division, based in Hiroshima, and from July 1941 onward was deployed in central China. Tominaga was captured during the Soviet invasion of Manchuria in 1945. As with many other Japanese prisoners of war in the Soviet Union, he was interned in a harsh POW camp in Siberia. In 1950, he was handed over to the People's Republic of China.

Tominaga was released in 1957 and returned to Japan. That same year, he co-founded a peace activist group.

In 2001, shortly prior to his death, he participated in the Japanese documentary film Japanese Devils.

== Sources ==
- Cook, Haruko Taya; Theodore F. Cook (1992). Japan at War: An Oral History. New Press. ISBN 1-56584-039-9.
- Reilly, Kevin Taya; Stephen Kaufman; Angela Bodino (2003). Racism: A Global Reader. M.E. Sharpe. ISBN 0-7656-1059-0.
