= Shozo Yoshigami =

Shozo Yoshigami (吉上 昭三, Yoshigami Shōzō, February 27, 1928 – January 28, 1996) was a Japanese translator of Polish literature, and a professor at the University of Tokyo.

== Work ==
Shozo translated, into the Japanese language, classical and contemporary works by Polish writers, including Henryk Sienkiewicz, Jerzy Andrzejewski, Jerzy Broszkiewicz and Stanisław Lem.

Yoshigami was also author of:

- Porando-gono nyumon (Introduction to Polish language), with Kimura Shoichi; and
- Hyojun porando kaiwa (Polish phrasebook), with Henryk Lipszyc.
