= Namiki Gohei I =

Japanese Writer

Namiki Gohei I 並木五瓶初代
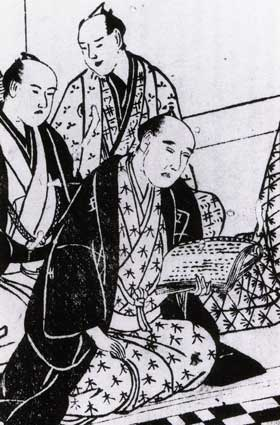
- Portrait of Namiki Gohei I
- Born: 1747; Osaka, Japan
- Died: 1808 (aged 60–61); Edo, Japan
- Occupations: Kabuki actor and playwright
- Writing career
- Period: Edo
- Genres: jidai-mono, sewa-mono

Namiki Gohei I (Japanese: 並木五瓶初代; 1747 – June 2, 1808) was a Kabuki playwright active in Kyoto, Edo and Osaka. He wrote over 100 plays, mostly in the genres of jidai-mono (historical) and sewa-mono (current events).

Born in the Doshōmachi district in Osaka in 1747, Gohei was a student of the playwright Namiki Shōzō I. By 1775 he was already the main playwright for the Hayakumo-za Kabuki theatre in Kyoto.

Two of his plays have been translated into English, The Temple Gate and the Paulownia Crest (1778, translated by Alan Cummings) and Five Great Powers that Secure Love (1794, translated by Julie A. Iezzi), both in Kabuki Plays on Stage II: Villainy and Vengeance, 1773-1799, edited by James R. Brandon and Samuel L. Leiter.

== Plays ==
(The following list is only a small selection of Namiki Gohei's most famous works.)

- Genpei Tsūrikimaru (1764) with Namiki Shōzō I
- Hi-no-Moto Banzei no Hōrai (1772) with Namiki Jūsuke
- Tenmangū Natane no Gokū (1777) with Nakamura Akei and Tatsuoka Mansaku
- Ōiri Kabuki no Tsuitachi (1777) with Nakamura Akei and Tatsuoka Mansaku
- Keisei Hakataori (1778)
- Kimon Gosan no Kiri (The Golden Gate and the Paulownia Crest, 1778)
- Keisei Yamato Zōshi (1784)
- Katsuragawa Renri no Shigarami (1784) adapted from a work of Suga Sensuke
- Taikō Shinkenki (1787)
- Sewa Ryōri Yaoya Kondate (1788)
- Shima Meguri Uso no Kikigaki (1794)
- Godairiki Koi no Fūjime (Five Great Powers that Secure Love, 1794)
- Suda no Haru Geisha Katagi (1796)
- Tomioka Koi no Yamabiraki (1798)
- Bandai Fueki Shibai no Hajimari (1807)
