= Namiki Shōzō II =

Namiki Shōzō II (並木正三) (died 1807) was a kabuki playwright and relative of the more prominent Namiki Shōzō I. Though none of his surviving plays are prominent ones, he may have been the author of the 1801 Kezairoku (or Gezairoku), a kabuki playwriting manual.
