= Namiki Shōzō I =

Japanese playwright

Namiki Shōzō I (並木正三) (1730–1773) was a prominent Japanese playwright who produced roughly 100 works for bunraku (puppet theater) and for kabuki. Shōzō is also credited with inventing the revolving stage (回り舞台, mawaributai), one of many tricks of stagecraft used extensively in kabuki, and with popularizing the use of trapdoors (セリ上げ, seriage).

Shōzō left bunraku in 1751; adapting plays from bunraku to kabuki was a very common practice, and it is likely that many of Shōzō's kabuki plays began as puppet productions.

His roughly one hundred plays were mostly jidai-mono (時代物, historical plays), and include Keisei ama no hagoromo (The Feathery Garment from Heaven, 1753), Sanjikkoku yobune no hajimari (The Beginning of the Heavy Cargo Ships on the Yodo River, 1758), and Sanzen-sekai yarikuri ōrai (Kin'emon the Notorious Pirate, 1772).

== See also ==
- Namiki Shōzō II
