= List of New York Times employees =

This is a list of notable former and current New York Times employees, reporters, and columnists.

== Current ==
=== Publisher ===
- A. G. Sulzberger (2018–present)

=== Masthead ===
List of masthead employees as of August 2022:

News

- Joseph Kahn, executive editor
- Carolyn Ryan, managing editor
- Rebecca Blumenstein, deputy managing editor
- Sam Dolnick, deputy managing editor
- Steve Duenes, deputy managing editor
- Clifford J. Levy, deputy managing editor
- Elisabeth Bumiller, assistant managing editor
- Monica Drake, assistant managing editor
- Sam Sifton, assistant managing editor
- Michael Slackman, assistant managing editor

Opinion

- Kathleen Kingsbury, opinion page editor

Business

- Meredith Kopit Levien, chief executive officer
- R. Anthony Benten, chief accounting officer, treasurer

=== Department heads ===
- Greg Winter, international managing editor
- Sia Michel, deputy culture editor
- Bill McDonald, obituaries editor
- Will Shortz, crossword puzzle editor
- Jake Silverstein, editor, The New York Times Magazine
- Gilbert Cruz, editor, The New York Times Book Review
- Hanya Yanagihara, editor, T: The New York Times Style Magazine

=== Main hubs of newsroom operations ===
- New York
- London
- Seoul

=== Bureau chiefs ===
Domestic bureaus

- Adam Nagourney, Los Angeles
- Frances Robles, Miami/Caribbean
- Elisabeth Bumiller, Washington

Foreign bureaus

- Anne Barnard, Beirut
- Declan Walsh, Cairo
- Dionne Searcey, Dakar
- Tim Arango, Istanbul
- Rod Nordland, Kabul
- Steven Erlanger, London (chief diplomatic correspondent)
- Mark Landler, London

Foreign bureaus (cont.)

- Anton Troianovski, Moscow
- Roger Cohen, Paris
- Keith Bradsher, Shanghai
- Javier C. Hernández, Tokyo
- Andrew Kramer, Ukraine
- Somini Sengupta, United Nations
- Choe Sang-Hun, Seoul

=== Op-ed columnists ===
Opinion columnists as of February 2024:

- Charles M. Blow
- Jamelle Bouie
- David Brooks
- Gail Collins
- Ross Douthat
- Maureen Dowd
- David French
- Thomas Friedman
- Michelle Goldberg
- Ezra Klein
- Nicholas Kristof
- Paul Krugman
- Carlos Lozada
- Tressie McMillan Cottom
- Pamela Paul
- Lydia Polgreen
- Bret Stephens
- Zeynep Tufekci

=== Other personnel ===
- Amir Hamja, photojournalist
- Eric Asimov, chief wine critic
- Peter Baker, chief White House correspondent
- Jo Becker, investigative reporter
- Tracy Bennett, Wordle editor
- Walt Bogdanich, investigative reporter
- Ben Brantley, theater critic
- Ben Casselman, economics reporter
- Susanne Craig, Pulitzer Prize winning investigative journalists.
- Manohla Dargis, film critic
- Jesse Green, theater critic
- Jim Dwyer, "About New York" columnist
- Thomas Feyer, letters editor
- Michael R. Gordon, chief military correspondent, winner of George Polk Award
- Maggie Haberman, White House reporter
- Stephen Holden, film critic
- Lara Jakes, diplomatic correspondent
- George Johnson, science reporter
- Dwight Garner, book critic
- Michiko Kakutani, book reviewer
- Christine Kay, enterprise consultant
- Florence Finch Kelly, book reviewer
- Kate Kelly Washington bureau correspondent
- Michael Kimmelman, architecture critic
- John Leland, popular culture, national
- David Leonhardt, senior writer
- Mark Mazzetti, National security correspondent
- Shawn McCreesh, White House reporter
- Katrina Miller, science reporter
- Dennis Overbye, former deputy science editor, currently a science reporter
- Philip P. Pan, Asia editor
- Jon Pareles, pop music critic
- Bill Pennington, columnist and sports reporter
- James Risen, national security correspondent
- Brian M. Rosenthal, investigative reporter
- Michael Rothfeld, investigative reporter
- David E. Sanger, Washington correspondent
- Charlie Savage, legal affairs correspondent
- A. O. Scott, critic at large
- Robert B. Semple Jr., associate editor, Times editorial page, Pulitzer Prize winner
- Scott Shane, national security correspondent
- Andrew Ross Sorkin, chief mergers & acquisitions correspondent
- Sheryl Gay Stolberg, Washington correspondent, covering health policy
- Neil Strauss, freelance music writer
- Marc Tracy, journalist on the Culture desk
- Anthony Tommasini, chief music critic
- David C. Unger, foreign affairs editorial writer
- Pete Wells, restaurant critic
- Chris Wiggins, chief data scientist
- Damon Winter, Pulitzer Prize-winning staff photographer
- Sheryl WuDunn, industry and international business editor and Pulitzer Prize winner
- Rory Smith, chief soccer correspondent

== Former ==
=== Publishers ===
- George Jones (1851-1891)
- Adolph Ochs (1896-1935)
- Arthur Hays Sulzberger (1935-1961)
- Orvil Dryfoos (1961-1963)
- Arthur Ochs "Punch" Sulzberger (1963-1992)
- Arthur Ochs Sulzberger Jr. (1992-2017)

=== Editors in chief ===
- Henry Jarvis Raymond (1851-1869)
- Charles Ransom Miller (1883-1922)

=== Executive editors ===
(position created in 1964 superseding managing editor as top news official)

- Turner Catledge (1964–1968)
- James Reston (1968–1969)
- position vacant (1969–1976)
- A. M. Rosenthal (1977–1986)
- Max Frankel (1986–1994)
- Joseph Lelyveld (1994–2001) and briefly in 2003
- Howell Raines (2001–2003)
- Bill Keller (2003–2011)
- Jill Abramson (2011–2014)
- Dean Baquet (2014–2022)
- Joseph Kahn (2022–)

=== Managing editors ===
- Carr Van Anda (1904-1932)
- Edwin Leland James (1932-1951)
- Turner Catledge (1952-1964)
- Clifton Daniel (1964-1969)
- A. M. Rosenthal (1969-1977)
- Seymour Topping (1977-1986)
- Arthur Gelb (1986-1989)
- Joseph Lelyveld (1990-1994)
- Gene Roberts (1994-1997)
- Bill Keller (1997-2001)
- Gerald M. Boyd (2001-2003)

title subsequently held by multiple people simultaneously

=== Editorial page editors ===
Titled Editor-in-Chief or Editor until retirement of Merz but never had authority over news pages.

- Rollo Ogden (1922-1937)
- John Huston Finley (1937-1938)
- John Bertram Oakes (1961-1976)
- Max Frankel (1977-1986)
- Jack Rosenthal (journalist) (1986-1993)
- Howell Raines (1993-2001)
- Gail Collins (2001-2006)
- Andrew Rosenthal (2007-2016)
- James Bennet (2016-2020)

=== Chief theater critics ===
- Brooks Atkinson (1922-1942;1946-1960)
- Clive Barnes, dance and theater critic (1965-1977)
- Walter Kerr (1966-1967; 1979-1980)
- Richard Eder (1977-1979)
- Frank Rich (1980-1993)
- David Richards (1993-1994)
- Vincent Canby (1994-1996)
- Ben Brantley (1996-2017; 2017-2020 as co-chief)
- Jesse Green, (2017-2020 as co-chief; 2020-present)

=== Chief restaurant critics ===
- Craig Claiborne, food editor who established "star" rating system (1957-1971)
- Raymond Sokolov (1971-1974)
- John L. Hess (1973-1974)
- John Canaday (1974-1976)
- Mimi Sheraton, first full-time restaurant critic (1976-1983)
- Marian Burros, interim critic (1983-1984)
- Ruth Reichl (1993-1999)
- William Grimes (1999-2003)
- Frank Bruni (2004-2009)
- Sam Sifton (2009-2011)
- Pete Wells (2011-2024)

=== Public editors ===
The public editor position was established in 2003 in response to the Jayson Blair scandal. In late May 2017, The New York Times announced that it was eliminating the post. Arthur Ochs Sulzberger Jr. announced: "The public editor position, created in the aftermath of a grave journalistic scandal, played a crucial part in rebuilding our readers’ trusts by acting as our in-house watchdog. We welcomed that criticism, even when it stung. But today, our followers on social media and our readers across the internet have come together to collectively serve as a modern watchdog, more vigilant and forceful than one person could ever be."

- Daniel Okrent (2003–2005)
- Byron Calame (2005–2007)
- Clark Hoyt (2007–2010)
- Margaret Sullivan (2012–2016)
- Elizabeth Spayd (2016–2017)

=== Other former personnel ===
- Matt Bai, news analyst and "Political Times" columnist
- Jayson Blair, reporter (1999–2003); resigned over plagiarism and fabrications
- Raymond Bonner, civil war reporter in El Salvador; resigned in protest
- Don Hogan Charles, photographer
- Adam Clymer, former correspondent in Washington, D.C.
- William G. Connolly, co-author of The New York Times Manual of Style and Usage
- Bill Cunningham, fashion photographer
- Anita Daniel, feature writer on various topics, notably travel
- Kurt Eichenwald, business reporter
- Janet Elder, deputy managing editor (died 2017)
- Vanessa Friedman, fashion critic
- James Goodale, Vice President and General Counsel
- Linda Greenhouse, U.S. Supreme Court correspondent, Pulitzer Prize winner
- Trish Hall, masthead editor overseeing six feature sections (2010–2011), op-ed editor (2011–2015), and senior editor (2015–2017)
- Bernard Holland, music critic (1981–1994), chief music critic (1995–2008)
- Cathy Horyn, fashion critic (1998–2014)
- Sarah Jeong, Editorial Board
- Walter Kerr, Sunday drama critic
- Peter Kihss, Pulitzer Prize nominee and renowned journalist (1952-1982)* Anna Kisselgoff, dance critic from 1968, chief dance critic (1977-2005)
- Arthur Krock, Pulitzer Prize winning correspondent and columnist
- Trymaine Lee, Harlem beat reporter (2006–2011)
- Christopher Lehmann-Haupt, book reviewer
- Eric Lichtblau, legal affairs reporter
- Hugo Lindgren, editor, The New York Times Magazine (2010–2013)
- Robert Lipsyte, sports journalist
- Herbert Matthews, reporter, known for interviewing Fidel Castro in his Sierra Maestra hideout
- Roscoe McGowen, sports journalist
- Judith Miller, reporter, jailed for refusing to reveal sources
- Gretchen Morgenson, business reporter and winner of Pulitzer Prize
- Jane Nickerson, first food editor (1942-1957)
- Rajiv Pant, chief technology officer (2011-2015)
- Patricia Peterson, fashion editor (1957-1977)
- Dith Pran, photojournalist during Cambodian war
- Andrew Revkin, environmental writer and Dot Earth blog creator (2007-2016)
- Saskia de Rothschild, former reporter for the International New York Times
- Harrison Salisbury, Pulitzer Prize and George Polk Award winner
- Sydney Schanberg, Pulitzer Prize and George Polk Award winner; resigned in protest.
- Harry Schwartz, former editorial board writer
- Cathy Scott, former correspondent in Las Vegas, Nevada
- Allan M. Siegal, co-author of The New York Times Manual of Style and Usage
- Louis Silverstein, design director
- Alison Smale, former Berlin bureau chief
- Craig S. Smith, former Shanghai bureau chief and founder of The New York Times' Chinese website
- Hedrick Smith, correspondent and bureau chief
- Barbara Strauch, editor (2000–2015)
- Walter Sullivan, science editor
- John Swinton, chief editorialist (1860–1869)
- Fred D. Thompson, former vice president for advertising
- Robin Toner, first women national political correspondent
- Don Van Natta Jr., Pulitzer Prize winning investigative correspondent
- Ivan Veit, former executive vice president
- Betsy Wade, copy editor (1956–2001)
- Bari Weiss, op-ed staff editor (2017–2020)
- Alden Whitman, chief obituary writer (1964-1976)
- Carey Winfrey, local and foreign correspondent
