= Benten (disambiguation) =

Benten is another name for the Japanese Buddhist goddess Benzaiten.

Benten may also refer to:

- Benten (Urusei Yatsura), a character in the manga series Urusei Yatsura
- Benten Botan, a Japanese manga series
- Benten Daiba, a fortress in the Republic of Ezo (1868–1869)
- Benten Island, an island in Antarctica
- Benten Kozō, a Japanese play
- Benten Kozō (1958 film)
- Benten-dō, a Buddhist temple dedicated to Benten or Benzaiten
- Benten-jima (Wakkanai), a deserted island in Hokkaidō, Japan
- Muhammad Saleh Benten, a Saudi politician
- R. Anthony Benten, vice president and treasurer of The New York Times Company

== See also ==
- Ben 10, an American media franchise
