= Sannin Kichisa Kuruwa no Hatsugai =

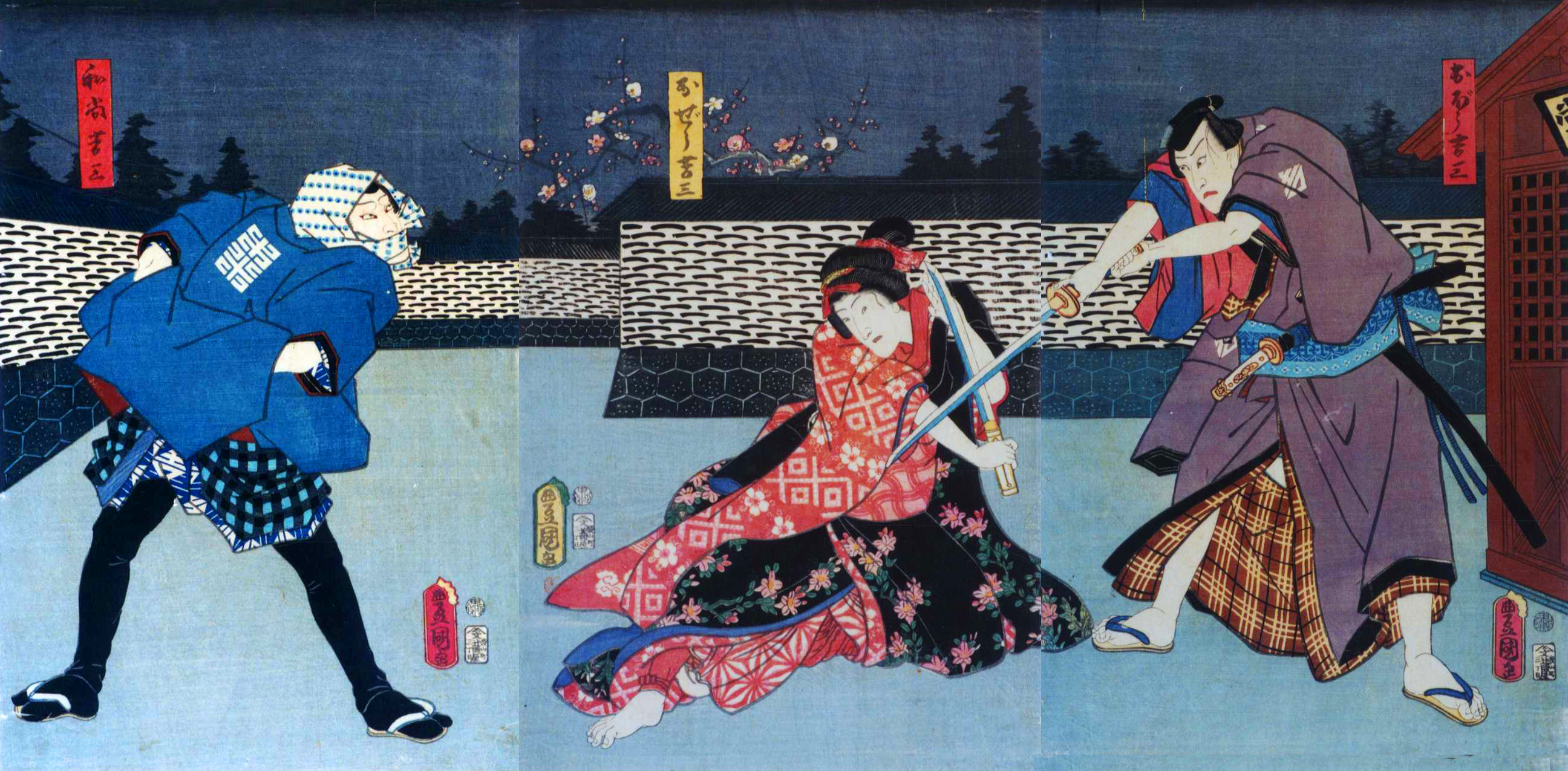
Ukiyo-e print illustrating San-nin Kichisa Kuruwa no Hatsu-gai, Toyokuni III, 1860

Sannin Kichisa Kuruwa no Hatsugai (Japanese: 三人吉三廓初買; "Three Kichisaburōs Go Shopping at the New Year in the Pleasure Quarters") is a Japanese kabuki play in seven acts by Kawatake Mokuami that premièred at the Ichimura-za theatre in Edo during the New Year 1860. It is popularly known as Sannin Kichisa (三人吉三; Japanese pronunciation: [saɲ.ɲiŋʲ kʲi̥.tɕiꜜ.sa]), and belongs to the sewamono and shiranamimono genres.

The play was not well-received; thirty years later it was re-performed in an abbreviated version called Sannin Kichisa Tomoe no Shiranami (三人吉三巴白浪), dropping a scene in the pleasure quarters (遊郭) in Yoshiwara that had made up a part of the original title. This revived version was a hit and has become a representative work that continues to be performed.
