= Ben Sisario =

American academic, author, and journalist

- Born: United States
- Occupations: Academic, author, journalist

Ben Sisario is an American academic, author, and journalist.

== Career ==
Sisario is a staff reporter for The New York Times, covering music and culture. He is also the author of Doolittle (2006), a non-fiction book in the 33 1/3 series about the studio album Doolittle (1989) by the Pixies, an alternative-rock band.

Sisario is a contributor to Blender, New York, Rolling Stone, Spin, New York City public-radio station WFUV and The Village Voice's annual Pazz & Jop music critics' poll.

He is a member of the teaching faculty at the Tisch School of the Arts at New York University, instructing courses on Rock Music in Historical Context and Writing for Popular Music.

== See also ==
- List of American journalists
- Lists of American writers
- List of New York University people
- List of non-fiction writers
- List of The New York Times employees

== Bibliography ==
- Sisario, Ben (2006). Doolittle. New York City: Continuum Publishing. ISBN 978-0-8264-1774-9.
