= Benten Kozō =

1862 kabuki play by Kawatake Mokuami

Aoto Zōshi Hana no Nishiki-e 青砥稿花紅彩画
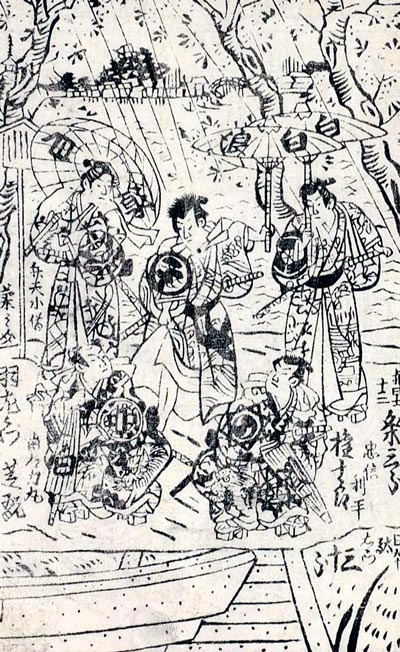
- Woodblock printed playbill image from the March 1862 premiere at the Ichimura-za theatre in Edo, featuring actors Ichimura Uzaemon XIII (top/left), Nakamura Shikan IV (bottom/left), Seki Sanjūrō III (center), Iwai Kumesaburō III (top/right) and Kawarazaki Gonjūrō I (bottom/right).
- Written by: Kawatake Mokuami
- Characters: Benten Kozō Kikunosuke; Nippon Daemon; Princess Senju; Hamamatsuya Kōbei
- Original language: Japanese
- Genre: shiranamimono, kizewamono
- Setting: Kamakura, Japan

Premiere
- Date premiered: March 1862
- Place premiered: Ichimura-za, Edo

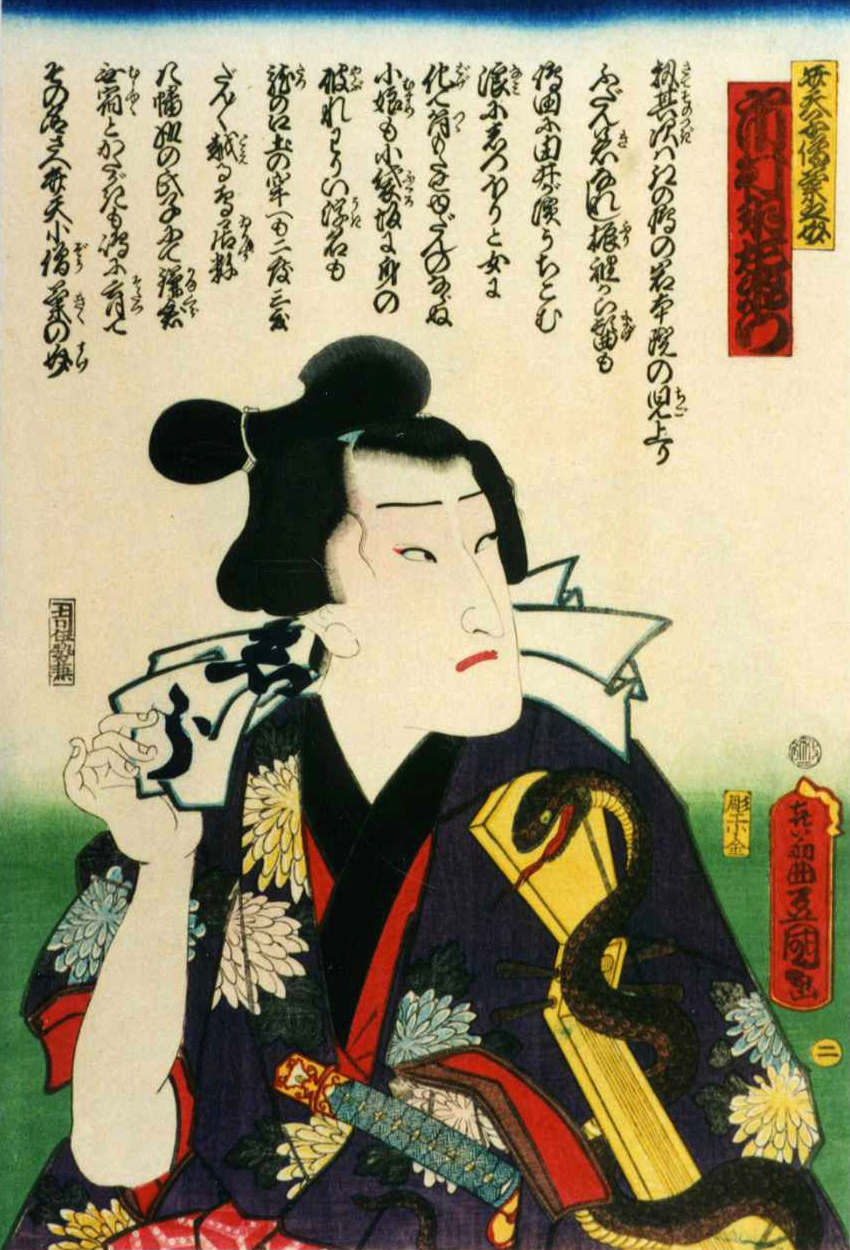
Hazaemon Ichimura XIII as Benten-kozo Kikunosuke by Toyokuni Utagawa III

"Aoto Zōshi Hana no Nishiki-e" (青砥稿花紅彩画), as the original and fullest version of this play is known, is a tale in five acts of the shiranamimono (tales of thieves) sub-category of the kizewamono (rough contemporary piece) genre of kabuki plays. Written by Kawatake Mokuami, it first premiered at the Ichimura-za in Edo in March 1862.

The play is frequently known by a number of other names. The name "Benten Kozō" (弁天小僧) actually refers to the main character of the play, a gizoku (honorable thief), one of a band of five such men. Another common name for this play is "Shiranami Gonin Otoko" (白浪五人男; "Five Men of the White Waves"), "shiranami" (white waves) being a term used to refer to thieves. Like most traditional Japanese dramas, the play originally had five acts, following particular conventions as to the dramatic pattern and themes of each act. However, today, it is very common to perform only one or two acts, each combination of acts represented by a different play title. For example, the title Benten Musume Meo no Shiranami refers to the performance of Acts III and/or IV without the other three.

The play centers on a band of five thieves, based on real thieves and criminals of Edo period Osaka: Karigane Bunshichi, An no Heibei, Gokuin Sen'emon, Kaminari Shōkurō and Hotei Ichiemon. The name of Nippon Daemon, the leader of the band, is taken from that of Nippon Saemon, who was captured and executed in 1747. The character of Benten Kozō, meanwhile, is said to have been based upon a servant at the Iwamoto-in temple on Enoshima, an island dedicated to the goddess Benten.

The play is perhaps most famous for the speeches made by Kozō and his compatriots when they dramatically remove their disguises and reveal their true identities.

== Characters ==
- Benten Kozō Kikunosuke – a young thief
- Nippon Daemon – leader of the band of thieves
- Nangō Rikimaru – a young thief
- Tadanobu Rihei – a young thief
- Akaboshi Jūzaburō – a young thief
- Princess Senju – a daughter of a powerful samurai or courtier
- Hamamatsuya Kōbei – owner of a kimono/cloth shop
- Hamamatsuya Sōnosuke – Kōbei's son-in-law

== Plot ==
=== Act I ===
The play opens upon a strikingly colorful scene of Hase-dera at the height of cherry blossom season. Princess Senju is praying at the temple for her late father and for Kotarō, her fiancé by an arranged marriage, who has gone missing.

Kotarō (actually Benten Kozō in disguise) then appears with an attendant (his fellow thief, Nangō Rikimaru in disguise), and the couple go into a nearby teahouse on the grounds; Senju has never before met Kotarō, and so has no reason to know what he should look like. Meanwhile, Akaboshi Jūzaburō, another thief, is discovered attempting to swindle money intended for the memorial service from members of Senju's party. A scuffle erupts and the group rushes into the teahouse where Benten Kozō is attempting to obtain from Senju a valuable gold incense burner which was a gift to her from Kotarō's family. Tadanobu Rihei, yet another thief who is disguised as an anonymous rōnin, drives them away and defuses the situation.

Believing that it is somehow her possession of the incense burner which has brought such violence and trouble to her and her party, Senju gives it to "Kotarō" for safekeeping. The pair then leave the temple for Mt. Mikoshi-ga-take as Rihei and Rikimaru fight for the 100 ryō stolen from the memorial service.

=== Act II ===
Senju and "Kotarō" hike up the mountain for some time, Kozō treating her quite nicely and playing the role of her fiancé. However, when she insists upon heading more directly and quickly for his home, he loses the disguise and announces his identity to her, explaining that he was named Benten Kozō after his home, the island of Benten-jima. His possession of Kotarō's flute, Chidori, being what originally convinced her that he was her betrothed, he concocts an explanation of how he came to obtain it. He explains that Kotarō came to him as a poor and ill traveler who asked him to safeguard the flute and to exchange it for the incense burner, just before he died. In truth, Benten Kozō took care of Kotarō before killing him for his money and taking the flute.

Betrayed and overwrought, Senju throws herself into a ravine, as a voice is heard from off-stage, announcing a desire for the golden object. Nippon Daemon, a great thief respected by all others, appears and demands that Kozō join him, and gather a band of other thieves for him. In exchange, he explains, he will allow Benten to keep the incense burner.

In the following scene, Senju is seen to have survived, and comes across Akaboshi Jūzaburō, who is preparing to commit seppuku (suicide) for his failure to rob her earlier. The two console one another, though in the end Senju throws herself once again into the ravine, killing herself. Jūzaburō returns to his preparations, but is stopped by Tadanobu Rihei, who gives him the 100 ryō stolen from Senju's followers, and convinces him to join him; thus all five thieves are united.

=== Act III ===
The climactic act of the play takes place inside the Hamamatsu-ya, a cloth and clothing shop run by Hamamatsuya Kōbei and his son-in-law Sōnosuke. Benten Kozō enters the shop, disguised as a high-ranking young lady seeking to buy wedding clothes, along with Rikimaru who acts as the lady's retainer.

One of the most celebrated elements of this play lies in the acting skills required to act the role of the low-class manly thief who is in turn acting as a classy, refined young woman. As most kabuki actors specialize only in male or female roles for their entire careers, a skillful performance of this scene serves as a dramatic demonstration of an actor's abilities.

The "lady" is shown a number of silks and brocades possibly suitable for her wedding dress, into which she inserts a small piece of cloth and then removes it, sticking it into her kimono. Noticed by Kōbei, she is accused of stealing, and a scuffle erupts. Rikimaru (as the lady's retainer) manages finally to mediate, with the help of the shop's neighbor and a few others. He shows a receipt from another shop for the scrap of fabric, proving it was not stolen from the Hamamatsu-ya. In the course of the fighting however, the "lady" suffered a blow to her head, for which Rikimaru then demands 100 ryō as recompense. As the pair prepare to leave with their illicit gains, however, a man by the name of Tamashima Ittō (Nippon Daemon in disguise) emerges from the backroom and points Kozō out, noting that the cherry blossom tattoo peeking out under his sleeves reveals him as a man.

Discovered, Kozō removes his outermost kimono, reveals his tattooed arm, and begins to explain his true identity, in one of the most popular monologues in the kabuki repertoire. Rikimaru also removes his samurai disguise, and Tamashima, acting outraged, offers to cut off the thieves' heads. Kōbei instead takes pity on them, and lets them go, even offering some plaster or salve for Kozō's injury.

The pair leave, and walk along the streets taking turns carrying the disguises and discussing how to split the money. This serves to introduce some levity and ease the narrative out of the emotional climax of the scene, helping to prepare the audience for the twists and emotion of the following scene, the true climax of the play. Tamashima Ittō is invited into the back room of the shop for a drink, perhaps in part in thanks for pointing out the thieves.

The next scene takes place in this back room. Drunk, Tamashima draws his sword and reveals himself as Nippon Daemon in a rousing speech, before demanding Kōbei hand over all the money in the shop. Though Rikimaru and Kozō have made off with 100 ryō, the entire ordeal was a ruse to help Daemon earn Kōbei's trust, and to get himself into the back room. Sōnosuke throws himself between the two, offering his own life instead of that of his father-in-law; Daemon stops, noting that he once had a son who would be roughly Sōnosuke's age. The two older men begin to talk about their pasts and come to the realization that not only is Daemon Sōnosuke's true father, but Kōbei is in fact Kozō's true father. Both men, for differing reasons, lost their sons at a crowded ritual ceremony at the Hase-dera over a decade prior, and agree to forget about Daemon's criminal scheme as they thank one another for taking care of one another's sons, though Kōbei does ask that Daemon attempt to turn all five of the thieves away from their lives of crime.

Kozō learns through this exchange that Kōbei was once a retainer of the Koyama family to which Princess Senju belongs. If Kōbei can return the stolen incense burner, he'll be reinstated as a samurai. As the police descend upon the shop, Kōbei offers Daemon a set of formal clothes ordered several days prior by the thieves.

=== Act IV ===
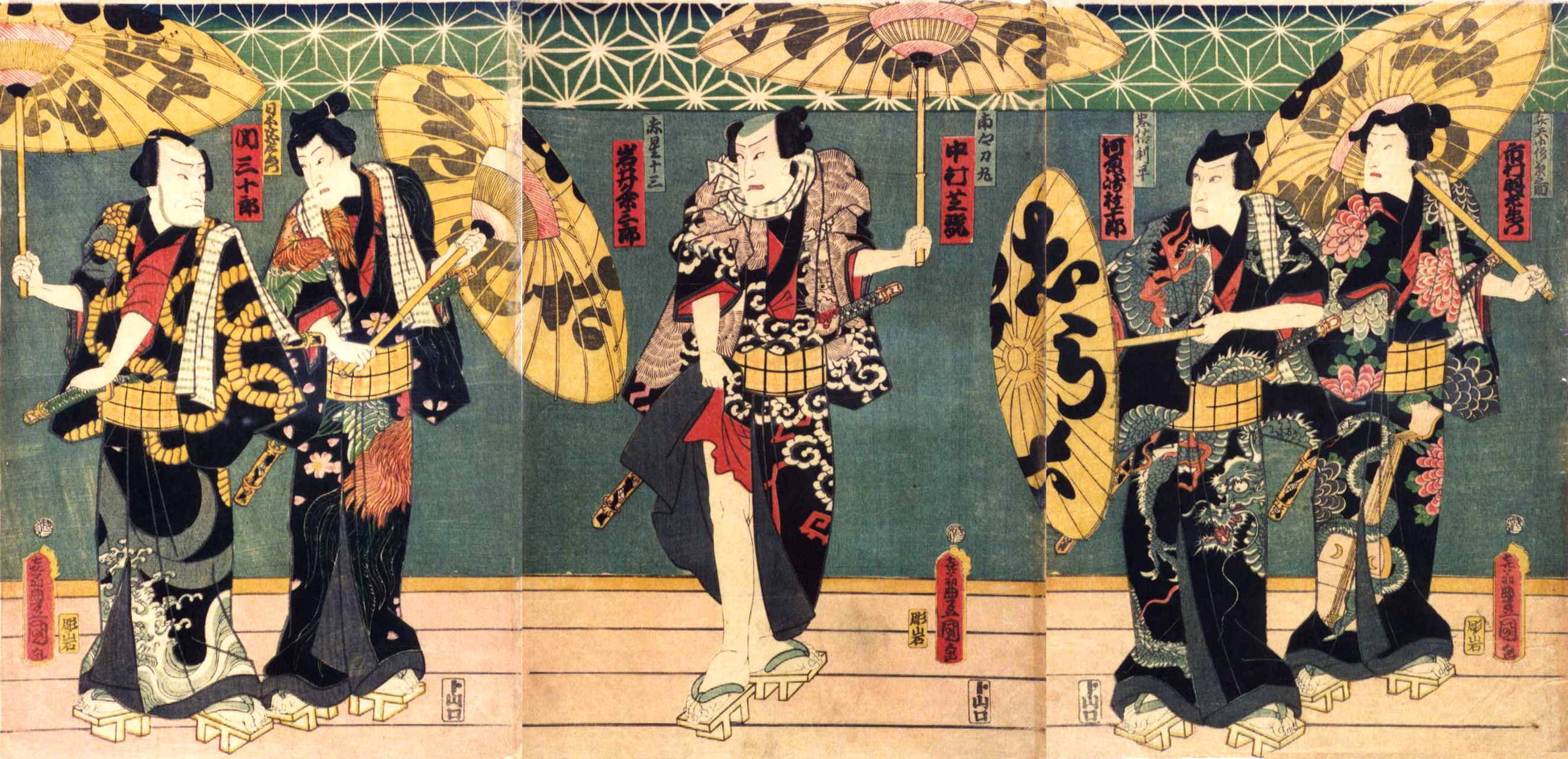
Inasegawa Seizoroi no Ba (“Act IV: Inase River Monologues) by Toyokuni Utagawa III, 1862 ---- From left: Sanjūrō Seki III as Nippon-daemon, Kumesaburō Iwai I (the future Hanshirō Iwai VIII) as Jūzaburō Akaboshi, Shikan Nakamura IV as Rikimaru Nangō, Gonjūrō Kawarazaki I (the future Danjūrō Ichikawa IX) as Rihei Tadanobu, and Uzaemon Ichimura XIII (the future Kikugorō Onoe V) as Benten-kozō Kikunosuke.

The single scene of the fourth act takes place on the banks of the Inase River where, surrounded by the police and clad in formal kimono, all five reveal their identities and life stories in celebrated monologues. They then overcome the police and flee.

=== Act V ===
The final act takes place at the Gokuraku-ji, where Kozō battles the police while searching for the lost incense burner. One of his band, who informed on him to the police, steals away the incense burner, and after a long battle, Kozō commits suicide on the roof of the temple gate, seeking to atone for all his crimes.

The transition to the next scene is likely one of the largest, and most famous, keren stage tricks in kabuki. The entire roof tilts backwards and out of the way, revealing Nippon Daemon standing on a veranda within the temple gate. He stands and watches the police search for him. Two of the thieves appear, convey the news of Kozō's death, and then attack him, explaining that they were policemen in disguise the entire time.

Daemon throws off the attack, and spots Aoto Fujitsuna, the top official after whom the play was originally named, on a small bridge down below. Aoto explains that his men found the incense burner in the river, and intend to return it to its rightful owners. Relieved, Daemon resolves to ask to be arrested, but Aoto generously offers to instead let him be at least until the end of the memorial service of the late shōgun; Daemon promises to turn himself in later in the day, and leaves.

== See also ==
- The Gay Masquerade a.k.a. Benten Kozō (1958 film)
