= Shirakoya Okuma =

Japanese attempted murderer

Shirakoya Okuma (白子屋 お熊; 1703–1727), also known as Kuma, was a Japanese woman who attempted to murder her husband with the help of a maid. The incident inspired bunraku puppet plays.

== Biography ==
Kuma was the eldest daughter of Shirakoya Shōzaburō (白子屋 庄三郎), the head of a timber wholesaler in Shin-Zaimokucho, in the business district of Nihonbashi, Edo (modern-day Tokyo). She later married a man named Matashirō (又四郎).

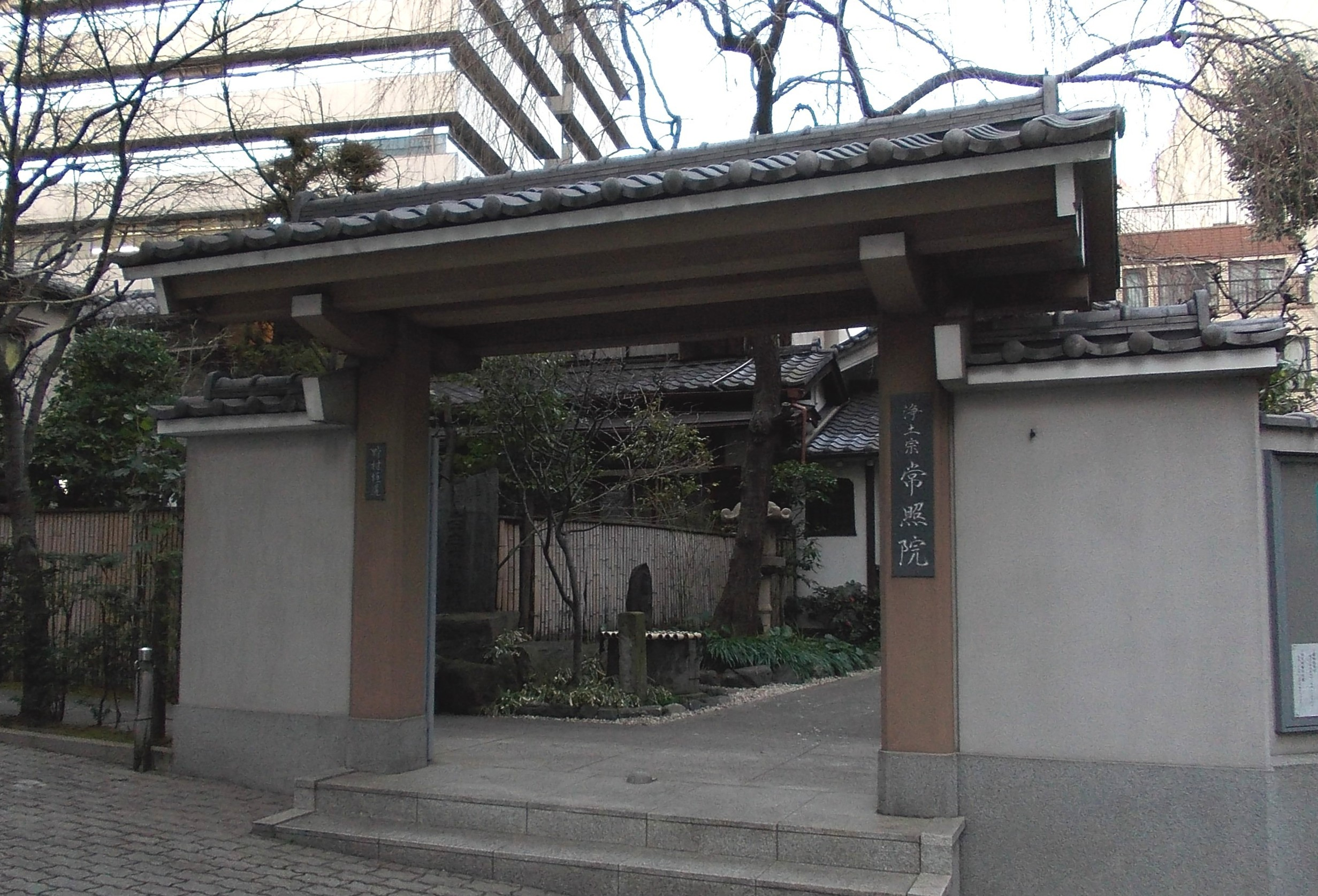
Jōshō-in Temple

She was the instigator of the Shirakoya Incident (白子屋事件, Shirakoya jiken), in which she conspired with her maid to kill her husband on October 17, 1726. She was caught, convicted, and on December 7, the presiding judge Ōoka Tadasuke sentenced her to death. At 23 years old, on February 25, 1727, Kuma was paraded through town and gibbeted. Her head was displayed in Asakusa and later buried. Her grave is currently at Jōshō-in Temple (常照院) in Minato, Tokyo.

Although the name Kuma means bear in Japanese, she was not considered ugly. In fact, her beauty contributed to her fame. Kuma and the Shirakoya Incident became the basis for multiple theatrical plays. Kuma served as the model for Zaimokuya Okoma in the 1775 Japanese puppet play Girl in Love Old Eight Inch (恋娘昔八丈, Koi-musume Mukashi Hachijo), and for the heroine of Bai-u kosode mukashi hachi-jo, a Kabuki drama written by Kawatake Mokuami.

== Summary of events ==
In the early morning of 17 October 1726, Kiku (きく), Kuma's sixteen-year-old maid, attacked Matashirō, Kuma's husband, with a razor while he was sleeping. Matashirō fought back and suffered a minor injury to his head. Matashirō survived as his wounds were shallow and he called for help after subduing Kiku.

The Shirakoya family proposed a private settlement to Matashirō's family. However, according to rumors, Matashirō and Kuma's marriage had become increasingly strained, and Kiku's motive for the crime was unknown. Therefore, Matashirō's family became suspicious of Shirakoya and reported the incident to the police on October 20. When the magistrate's office investigated Kiku, she confessed to being an accomplice to Kuma in the attempted murder. Once Kiku's testimony was known, the magistrate's office questioned Kuma, who confessed to the murder plot.

The Shirokoya family were having financial troubles at the time of Kuma and Matashirō's marriage, and their union was originally a financial agreement for betrothal money from Matashirō, who was the son of a wealthy man. Kuma hated her husband, and after receiving guidance from her old maid Hisa (ひさ), she began an intimate relationship with houseboy Chūhachi (忠八). Aware of her daughter's adultery, Tsune, Kuma's mother, approved of their relationship.

Kuma wanted a divorce, but if she did so, she would have to return the betrothal money. She thought if Matashirō died of disease, she wouldn't have to return the money and she would be free to marry Chuhachi. They began to plot the murder together, initially planning to poison Matashirō. They tricked Yokoyama Ryugen (横山玄柳), a visually impaired massage practitioner, to administer poison to Matashirō. However, the poison did not kill him, it only made him unwell. When the plan failed, Kuma became impatient and threatened Kiku into attacking Matashirō. However, they were humiliated when the plot came to light.

== Resolution ==
Director of general Shōzaburō, who failed oversight of one's family and employee and caused disturbance to the public, and Yokoyama Genshu, engaged in a plot in the dark were sentenced banishment from Edo. Kiku was sentenced to death. Hisa was paraded through town and humiliated, she was then mounted to the scaffold for the crime of abetting Chūhachi and Kuma's adultery. Chūhachi was also paraded through town and humiliated, he was then mounted to the scaffold for the crime of being an accessory. Kuma was paraded through town and humiliated, she was then mounted to the scaffold for adultery and attempted murder. Before marriage, Kuma was widely known and acknowledged as a beautiful girl, during the parade, people gathered in an effort to catch a glimpse of the wicked woman in the area along a road. It is said that Kuma was forced to ride bareback wearing a dressed yellow eight length (黄八丈, kihachijō) short-sleeved kimono, which was very expensive at the time. She wore white underclothes and middleclothes, with a crystal bardroll around her neck.

== Aftermath ==
The beauty of Kuma and the flashy performance during the parade caused repercussions in Edo. The incident is recorded in historical records of the time, including the Kinsei edo chomonshū (近世江都著聞集), Kyōhō tsugan (享保通鑑), Toen shōsetsu yoroku (兎園小説余録), Edo masago rokujūjō kōhon (江戸真砂六十帖広本), and Bukō nenpyō (武江年表).
