= Christopher Gray (architectural historian) =

American journalist (1950–2017)

Christopher Stewart Gray (April 24, 1950 – March 10, 2017) was an American journalist and architectural historian. He was noted for his weekly column "Streetscapes" in The New York Times, about the history of New York City architecture, real estate and public improvements.

== Career ==
Gray wrote the "Streetscapes" column from 1986 until December 2014. His work focuses on architecture, history and preservation policies of New York City.

He also wrote extensively about architecture for the magazines Avenue and House & Garden, and was the founder of the Office for Metropolitan History, an organization that provides research on the history of New York buildings. He wrote a column, "All the Best Places", from 1982 to 1985 on American streets for House & Garden.

== Awards and honors ==
Gray received awards for his research and writing from the following:

- American Institute of Architects
- Classical America
- New York Genealogical and Biographical Society
- New York Landmarks Conservancy
- New York Society Library
- Preservation League of New York State

== Books ==
- New York, Empire City (with David Stravitz; Harry N. Abrams, 2004) ISBN 0-8109-5011-1
- New York Streetscapes (Harry N. Abrams, 2003 - Research by Suzanne Braley) ISBN 0-8109-4441-3
- The Chrysler Building: Creating a New York Icon Day by Day (with David Stravitz; Princeton Architectural Press, 2002 - Research by Suzanne Braley) ISBN 1-56898-354-9
- Sutton Place, Uncommon Community by the River (Sutton Area Community, 1997) ISBN 0-9652934-0-8
- Fifth Avenue, from Start to Finish, 1911, in Historic Block-by-Block Photographs (Dover, 1994 - Research by Suzanne Braley) ISBN 0-486-28146-9
- Changing New York (Dover Publications, 1992 - Research by Raymond Fike) ISBN 0-486-26936-1
- Blueprints (with John Boswell; Simon & Schuster, 1981) ISBN 0-671-41973-0

== See also ==
- List of American historians
- List of American print journalists
- List of The New York Times employees
- List of people from New York City
