= Kawatake Mokuami =

Japanese dramatist of Kabuki

Kawatake Mokuami 河竹黙阿弥
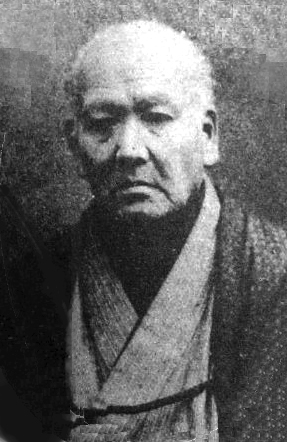
- Portrait of Mokuami Kawatake
- Born: 1 March 1816; Nihonbashi, Chūō-ku, Tokyo, Japan
- Died: 22 January 1893 (aged 76); Tokyo, Japan
- Occupation: Kabuki
- Parent: Kanbei Yoshimura (father)
- Relatives: Kawatake Shigetoshi (adopted son)
- Writing career
- Period: Edo
- Genres: sewamono; jidaimono; shosagoto

Kawatake Mokuami (Note: Japanese pronunciation: [kä̀.β̞ä́.tä̀.kè̞ | mò̞.ꜜkɯ̈́.ä́.mʲí, -tä̀.kè̞ mò̞.kɯ̈̀.ä̀.mʲì, -tä́.ké̞ | mò̞.kɯ̈́.ä́.mʲí, -tä́.ké̞ mó̞.kɯ̈́.ä́.mʲí, -tä́.ké̞ mó̞.kɯ̈́.ä̀.mʲì]) (河竹 黙阿弥; 1 March 1816 – 22 January 1893), born Yoshimura Yoshisaburō (吉村 芳三郎) was a Japanese dramatist of Kabuki. It has been said that "as a writer of plays of Kabuki origin, he was one of the greatest, if not the greatest, Japan has ever known". He wrote 150 or so plays over the course of his 58-year career, covering a wide variety of themes, styles, and forms, including short dance pieces, period plays (jidaimono), contemporary genre pieces (sewamono), tragedies and comedies, as well as adaptations of foreign (Western) stories, though he is perhaps most famous for his shiranamimono, plays featuring sympathetic or tragic rogues and thieves. For the greater part of his career he wrote under the professional name Kawatake Shinshichi, only taking the name Mokuami on his retirement from the stage in 1881.

== Life and career ==
Mokuami was born in the Nihonbashi district of Edo (modern-day Tokyo). He was disinherited by his father at age fourteen, and obtained work at a lending library, introducing him to the world of theatre. In 1835, he entered into an apprenticeship with Tsuruya Nanboku IV, and in 1843 became the lead playwright (tate-sakusha) for the Kawarazaki-za theatre, succeeding to the name Kawatake Shinshichi II. He began working with kabuki star Ichikawa Kodanji IV in 1854, producing kizewamono pieces. Most of Mokuami's works are in this form, and were written specifically for the star actors of the time, such as Onoe Kikugorō V and Ichikawa Kodanji IV. Many of his plays, such as the famous Benten Kozō, featured thieves and robbers, also known as shiranami (white waves), whom he represented somewhat sympathetically, as low-class heroes, or as tragic figures.

As Japan modernized and Westernized rapidly in the Meiji period, Mokuami moved along with new trends in theatre, becoming a pioneer of Shin-kabuki ("New Kabuki"), writing plays in new genres such as katsurekimono (realistic, historically accurate jidaimono period plays) and zangirimono (sewamono genre plays featuring Meiji era contemporary characters and setting).

During his 58-year career, he became the most prolific kabuki author in history, producing over 360 works: 130 sewamono, 90 jidaimono, and 140 dances. Mokuami formally retired in 1881, but continued to present new works, and was spoken highly of by novelist and literary critic Tsubouchi Shōyō. Mokuami died in 1893 and is buried at Gentsū-ji in Nakano, Tokyo.

== Selected works ==
- Izayoi Seishin (1859)
- Sannin Kichisa Kuruwa no Hatsugai (1860)
- Murai Chōan (1862)
- Benten Kozō aka Shiranami Gonin Otoko (1862)
- Marubashi Chūya aka Keian Taiheiki (1870)
- Renjishi (Two Lions) (1872)
- Sakai no Taiko (Sakai's Drum) (1873)
- Kamiyui Shinza (Shinza the Barber) (1873)
- Ningen Banji Kane Yono Naka (Everything in the World is Run by Money) (1878), an adaptation of Money (play) by Edward_Bulwer-Lytton
- Kumo ni Magō Ueno no Hatsuhana (1881)
- Tsuchigumo (1881)
- Ibaraki (The Demon Ibaraki) (1883)
- Funa Benkei (1885)
- Momijigari (1887)
