= Renjishi =

Kabuki dance with lyrics written by Kawatake Mokuami

Renjishi 連獅子
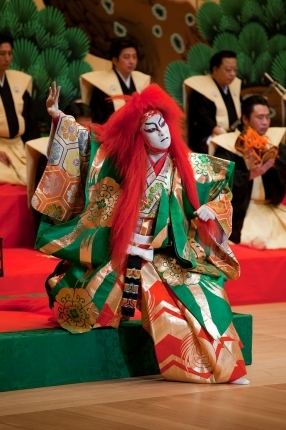
- Nakamura Shichinosuke II performing Renjishi in Yokohama, 2010
- Written by: Kawatake Mokuami (lyrics); Hanayagi Jusuke I (choreography)
- Original language: Japanese
- Genre: shosagoto

Premiere
- Date premiered: July 1872, Murayama-za, Tokyo
- Place premiered: Japan

Renjishi (連獅子), or Two Lions, is a kabuki dance with lyrics written by Kawatake Mokuami, choreography by Hanayagi Jusuke I and music by Kineya Shōjirō III and Kineya Katsusaburō II, first performed in 1872.

Originally staged for a private dance recital in 1861, it was later expanded and reused in July 1872 as the fourth act for another play at the Murayama-za in Tokyo. Renjishi continued to evolve, with two different sets of music being used (both still performed), and the comic interlude added in 1901. A later version was created for one father and two lion cubs.

One of many kabuki works based on the noh play Shakkyō (The Stone Bridge), in the last stages of Renjishi development as a kabuki dance it was brought closer back to the noh version. In particular, in the February 1901 performance at the Tokyo-za, Renjishi was turned into a matsubame mono (pine-board play), modifying the stage to replicate the noh stage's green pine tree background.

It is a popular dance in the kabuki repertoire that is often performed.

== Characters ==
- Ukon - an actor
- Sakon - another actor, younger
- Rennen - a Nichiren buddhist monk on pilgrimage to Mount Seiryō
- Hennen - a Pure Land buddhist monk on pilgrimage to Mount Seiryō
- Spirit of the Parent Lion
- Spirit of the Lion Cub
- Stage assistants
- Nagauta - musical ensemble

== Plot ==
"Renjishi" is a classical Kabuki play that tells the story of a lion dance performed by a father and son lion. The plot revolves around the relationship between the father lion, who is aging and weak, and his young, strong son. It's a symbolic representation of the passing of strength and legacy from one generation to another, showcasing themes of loyalty, family, and the cycle of life.

== Performances ==
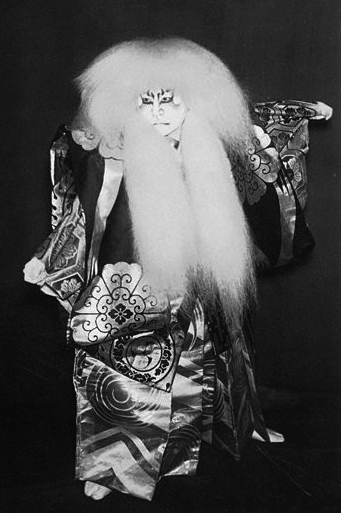
Ennosuke Ichikawa II in Renjishi

The first performance of Renjishi happened at a private dance recital in May 1861 at the Nakamura-rō, a restaurant in the Ryōgoku are in Edo. The recital celebrated the name succession of the famous dance master Hanayagi Jusuke I (1821–1903) by his son Hanayagi Yoshijirō. Father and son performed the original dance, with Jusuke's choreography and Kawatake Mokuami's lyrics. The performance took place in a very simple setting, with only a golden screen, and no costumes or makeup. This unadorned style of dance is called suodori.

The dance made its debut at the kabuki stage in July 1872 at the Murayama-za in Tokyo, as the fourth act for another play. Bandō Hikosaburō V played the role of the parent lion, and Sawamura Tosshō II the role of the cub lion.

Renjishi was staged at the Kabuki-za in Tokyo in July 2017, with Ichikawa Ebizō XI as the parent lion and Bandō Minosuke II as the cub.

In September 2019, the Kabuki actor Ichikawa Udanji III and his son Ukon performed part of the Renjishi at the 2019 Rugby World Cup opening ceremony as the shishi of Renjishi were used as mascots for the tournament.

== Translation ==
The play was translated into English by Paul M. Griffith in Kabuki Plays on Stage IV: Restoration and Reform, 1872-1905, edited by James R. Brandon and Samuel L. Leiter and published in 2003.

- Kabuki Plays on Stage IV: Restoration and Reform, 1872-1905. (2003) University of Hawaii Press, ISBN 9780824825744.

== See also ==
- Shaguma
