= Monica Drake (journalist) =

American journalist and managing editor

- Born: Yellow Springs, Ohio, U.S.
- Education: Yale University; Columbia University
- Occupation: Editor at The New York Times
- Years active: 1998–present
- Spouse: Greg Winter (m. 2006)

Monica Drake is an American journalist and deputy managing editor at The New York Times. Drake is the first African-American woman to serve on the newsroom's print masthead.

== Biography ==
Drake was born to internist Kathleen Glover and attorney Macarthur Drake. Drake is from Yellow Springs, Ohio and attended Yellow Springs High School. Drake attended Yale University and then the School of Journalism at Columbia University. She joined The New York Times as an intern in 1998, and became a copy editor in 2001. Drake worked at the Culture Desk, then became the senior Travel editor before becoming a deputy managing editor, making her the first African-American woman to serve on the print masthead. In her new position, Drake posted a listing for a "dream" traveling job that got national attention and received over 13,000 applications. As an assistant managing editor(2017-23), she founded a new column called "Surfacing" which focuses on subcultures around the world and appears both online and in print.

Drake married journalist Greg Winter in 2006.
