= Benten Kozō (1958 film) =

1958 film

The Gay Masquerade Benten Kozō
- Japanese movie poster
- Directed by: Daisuke Itō
- Cinematography: Kazuo Miyagawa
- Distributed by: Daiei Film
- Release date: 29 November 1958 (Japan)
- Running time: 85 minutes
- Country: Japan
- Language: Japanese

The Gay Masquerade (Japanese: 弁天小僧, Hepburn: Benten Kozō) a.k.a.. The Jovial Rascals of Edo, is a 1958 color Japanese film directed by Daisuke Itō.

The film won 1959 Blue Ribbon Awards for best actor Raizo Ichikawa and for best cinematography Kazuo Miyagawa. The film also won 1959 Kinema Junpo Award for best actor Raizo Ichikawa.

== Cast ==
- Raizo Ichikawa as Benten Kozō Kikunosuke
- Shintaro Katsu
- and others
