= Hase-dera (Kamakura) =

Buddhist temple in Kamakura, Japan

Coordinates: 35°18′45″N 139°31′59″E

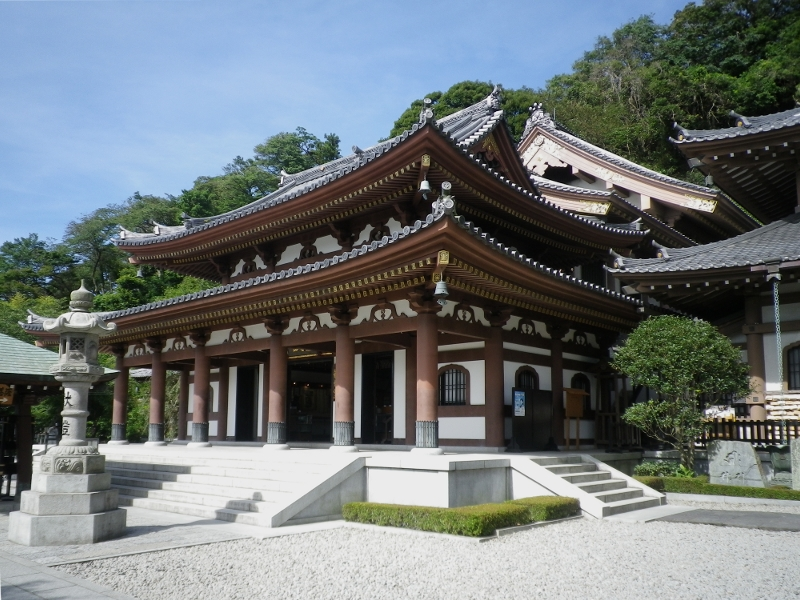
- Kannon-dō (Main hall)

Religion
- Affiliation: Jōdo-shū
- Deity: Jūichimen Kannon (Eleven-Headed Kannon)

Location
- Location: 3-11-2 Hase, Kamakura, Kanagawa Prefecture
- Country: Japan
- Interactive map of Hase-dera

Architecture
- Founder: Tokudō Shōnin
- Completed: 736

Website
- http://www.hasedera.jp

Hase-dera (海光山慈照院長谷寺, Kaikō-zan Jishō-in Hase-dera), commonly called the Hase-kannon (長谷観音), is one of the Buddhist temples in the city of Kamakura in Kanagawa Prefecture, Japan, famous for housing a massive wooden statue of Jūichimen Kannon, an eleven-headed manifestation of the Bodhisattva Kannon.

The temple originally belonged to the Tendai sect of Buddhism, but eventually became an independent temple of the Jōdo-shū.

== History ==
Legend has it that the temple was established in the Tenpyō era (729-749 C.E.). However, documents at the temple suggest that the temple really came into its own during the Kamakura period (1192-1333).

== Statue ==
The main statue of Kannon is one of the largest wooden statues in Japan, with a height of 9.18 metres (30.1 ft) It is made from camphor wood, with gold gilding. It has 11 heads, each of which represents a different phase in the search for enlightenment.

According to legend, the statue is one of two images of Kannon carved by a monk named Tokudō in 721. The camphor tree was so large, according to legend, that he decided that he could carve two statues with it. One was enshrined in Hase-dera in the city of Nara, Yamato Province, while the other was set adrift in the sea to find the place with which it had a karmic connection. The statue washed ashore on Nagai Beach on the Miura Peninsula near Kamakura in the year 736. The statue was immediately brought to Kamakura where a temple was built to honor it.

== Temple buildings ==
The temple sits about half-way up Mount Kamakura, southwest of the city of Kamakura. The temple commands an impressive view over Yuigahama.

Seven buildings make up the temple complex.

== Temple grounds ==
The temple is built on two levels and also includes a cave. The cave, called benten kutsu (Benzaiten Grotto), contains a long winding tunnel with a low ceiling and various statues and devotionals to Benzaiten, the sea goddess and the only female of the Seven Lucky Gods in Japanese mythology.

The temple is famous for its hydrangeas, which bloom along the Hydrangea Path in June and July.

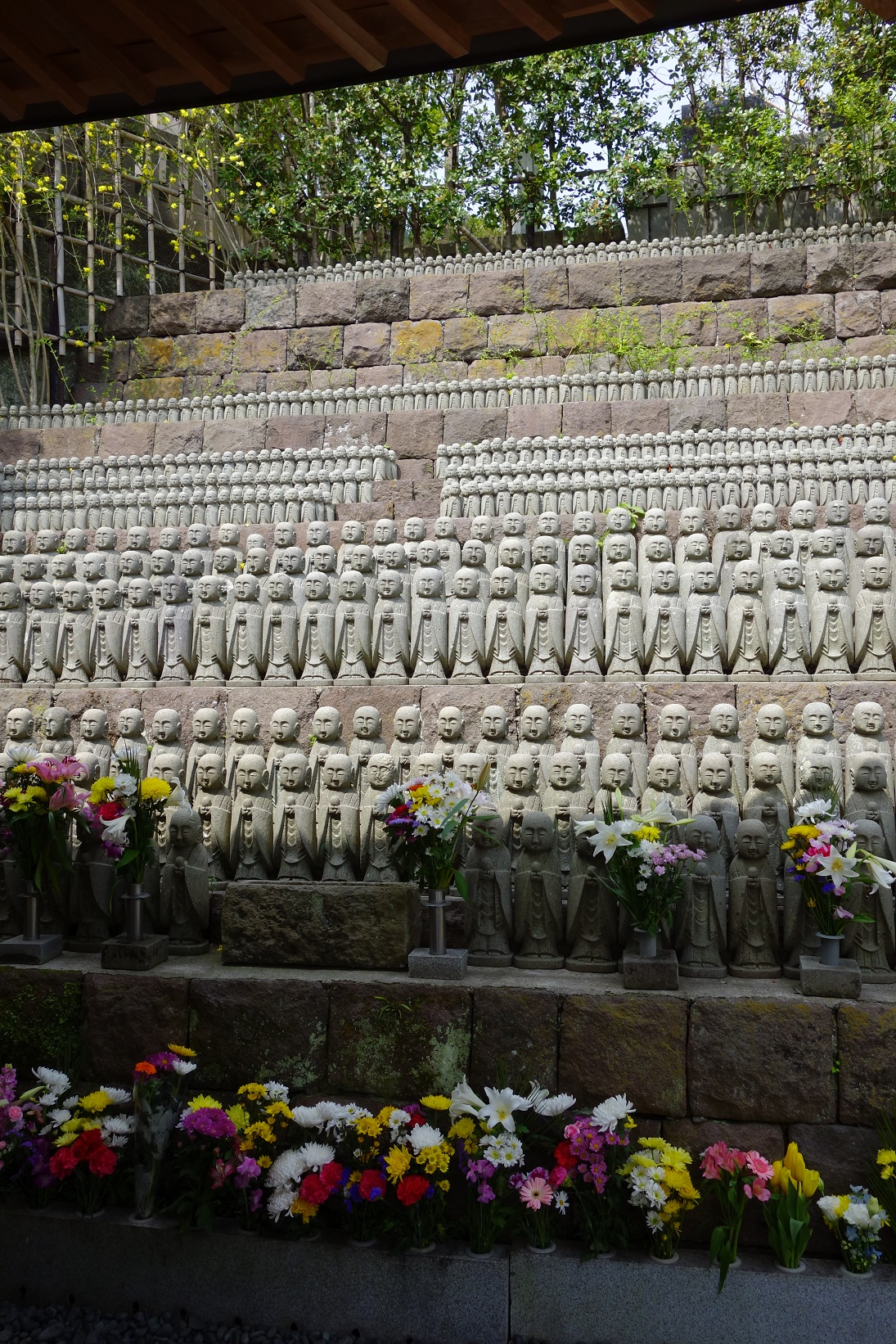
Jizō statues at Jizō-Do

The grounds of the temple are home to hundreds of small Jizō statues, placed by parents mourning offspring lost to miscarriage, stillbirth, or abortion. These statues remain in place for about a year, before being removed to make way for more statues; it is estimated that some 50,000 Jizō statues have been placed at Hase-dera since World War II.

== Pilgrimage routes ==
The temple is the fourth of the 33 stations of two different pilgrimage routes:

- Bandō Sanjūsankasho pilgrimage circuit dedicated to the goddess Kannon
- Kamakura Kannon Pilgrimage

== Gallery ==
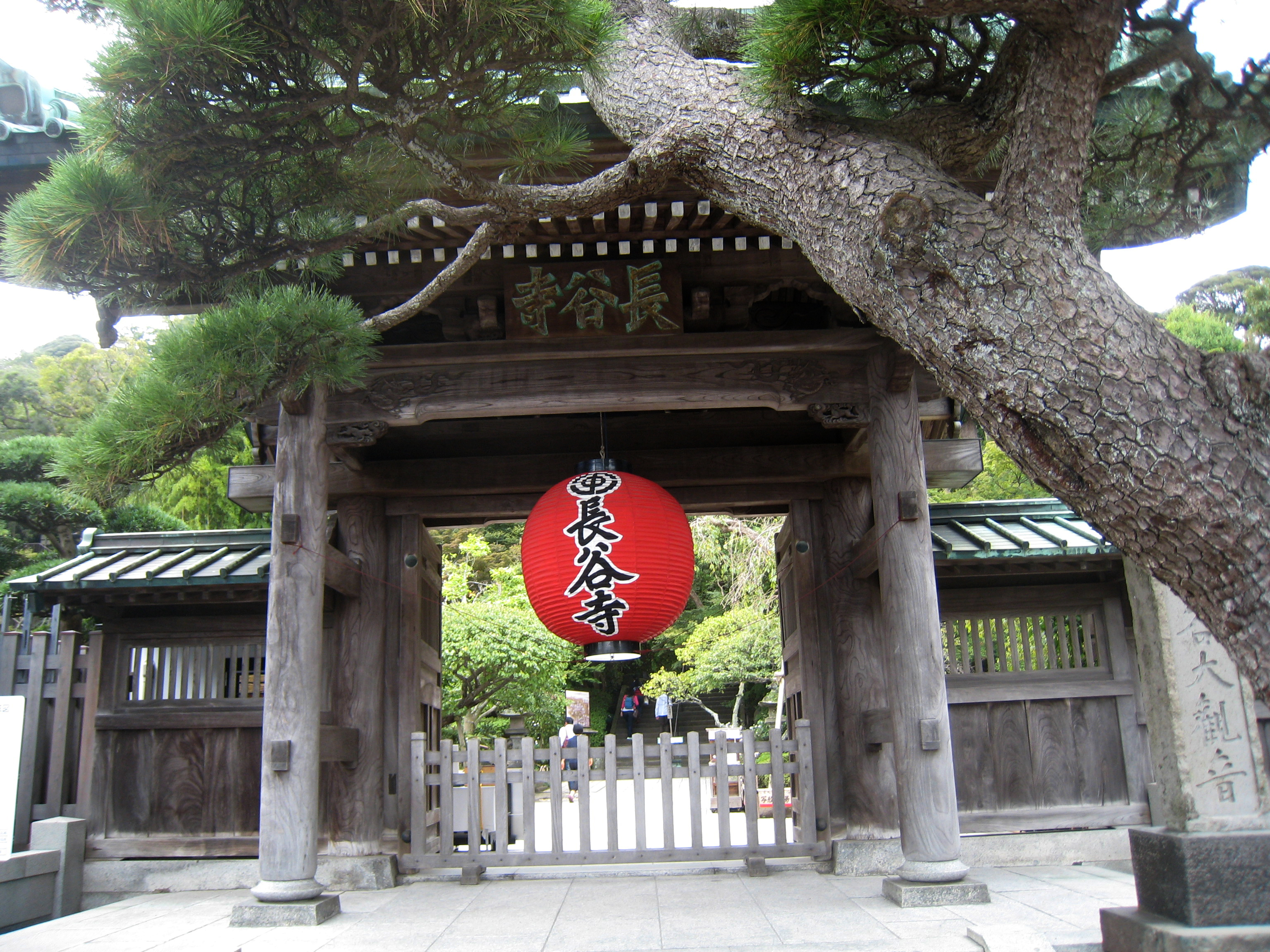
Sanmon (main gate)

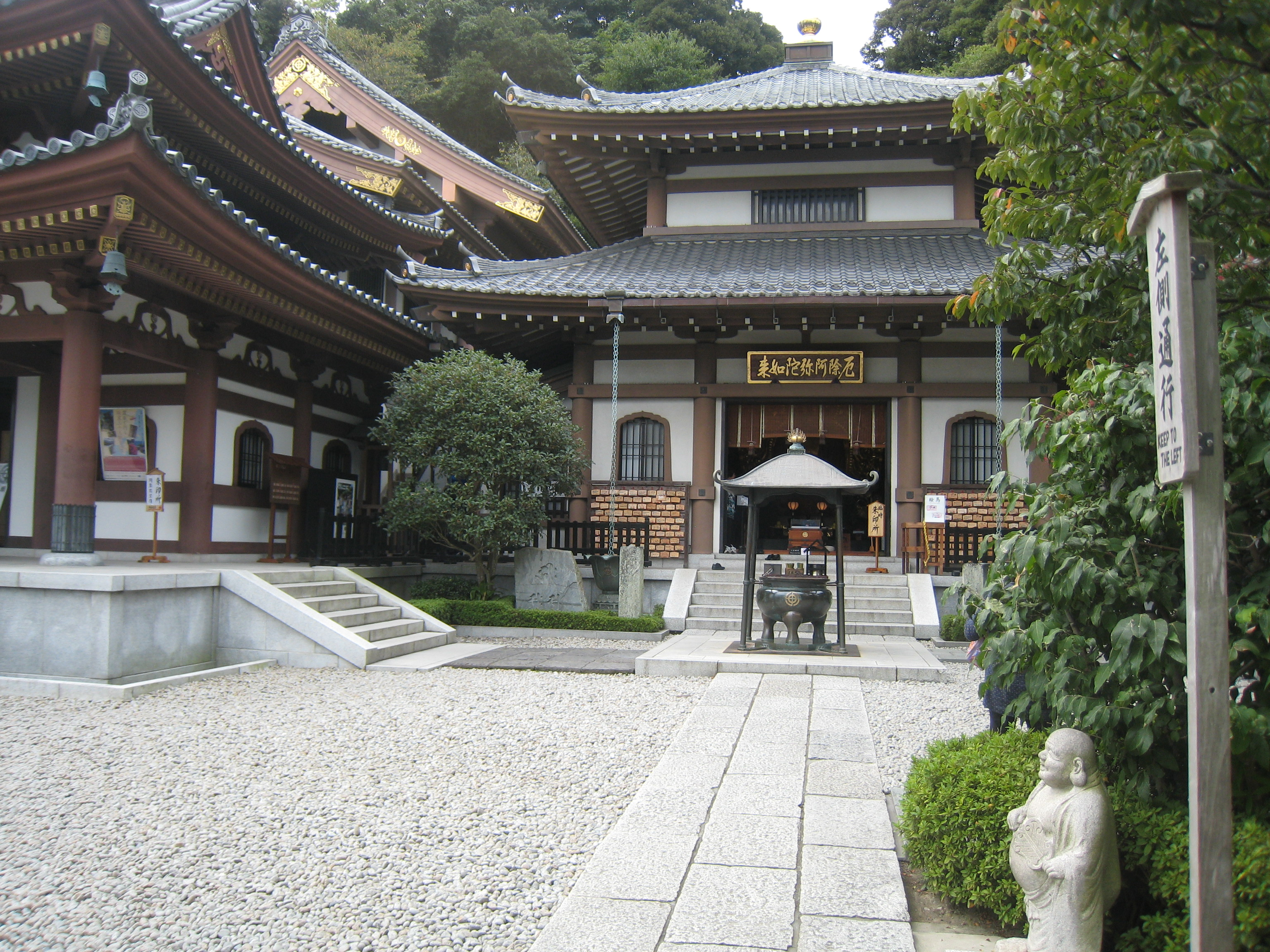
Amida-do

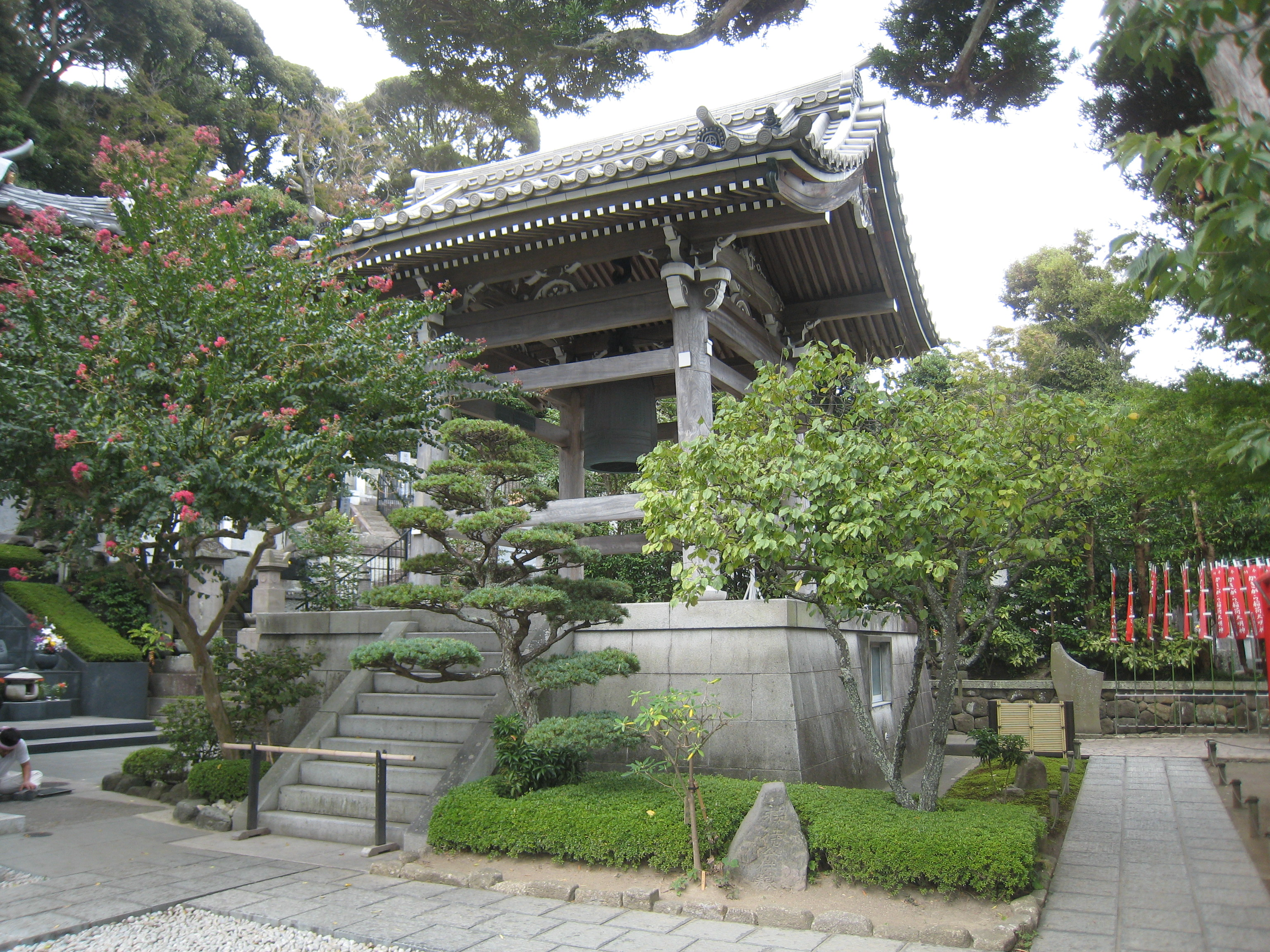
Shōrō (belfry)

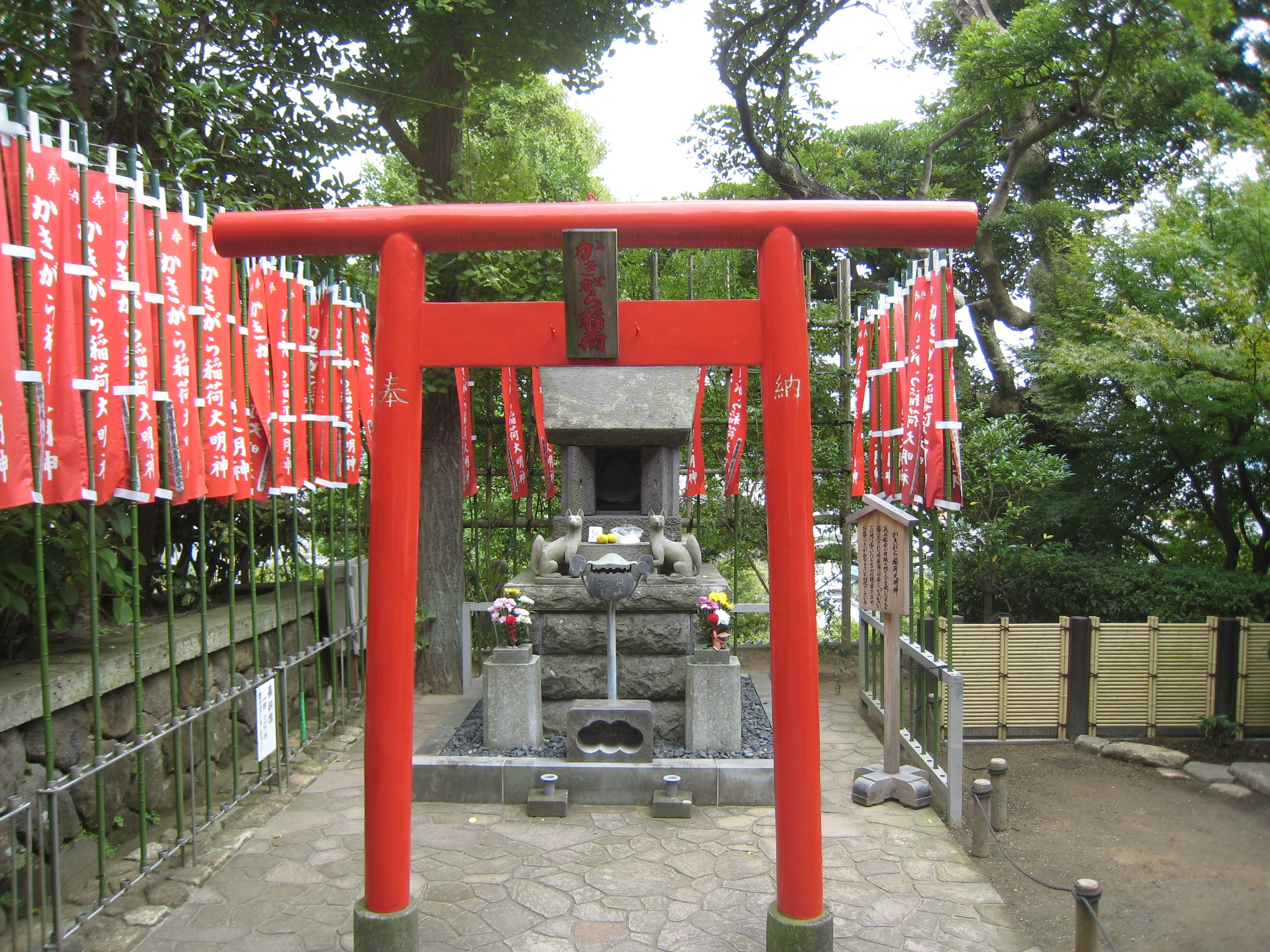
Kakigara-Inari

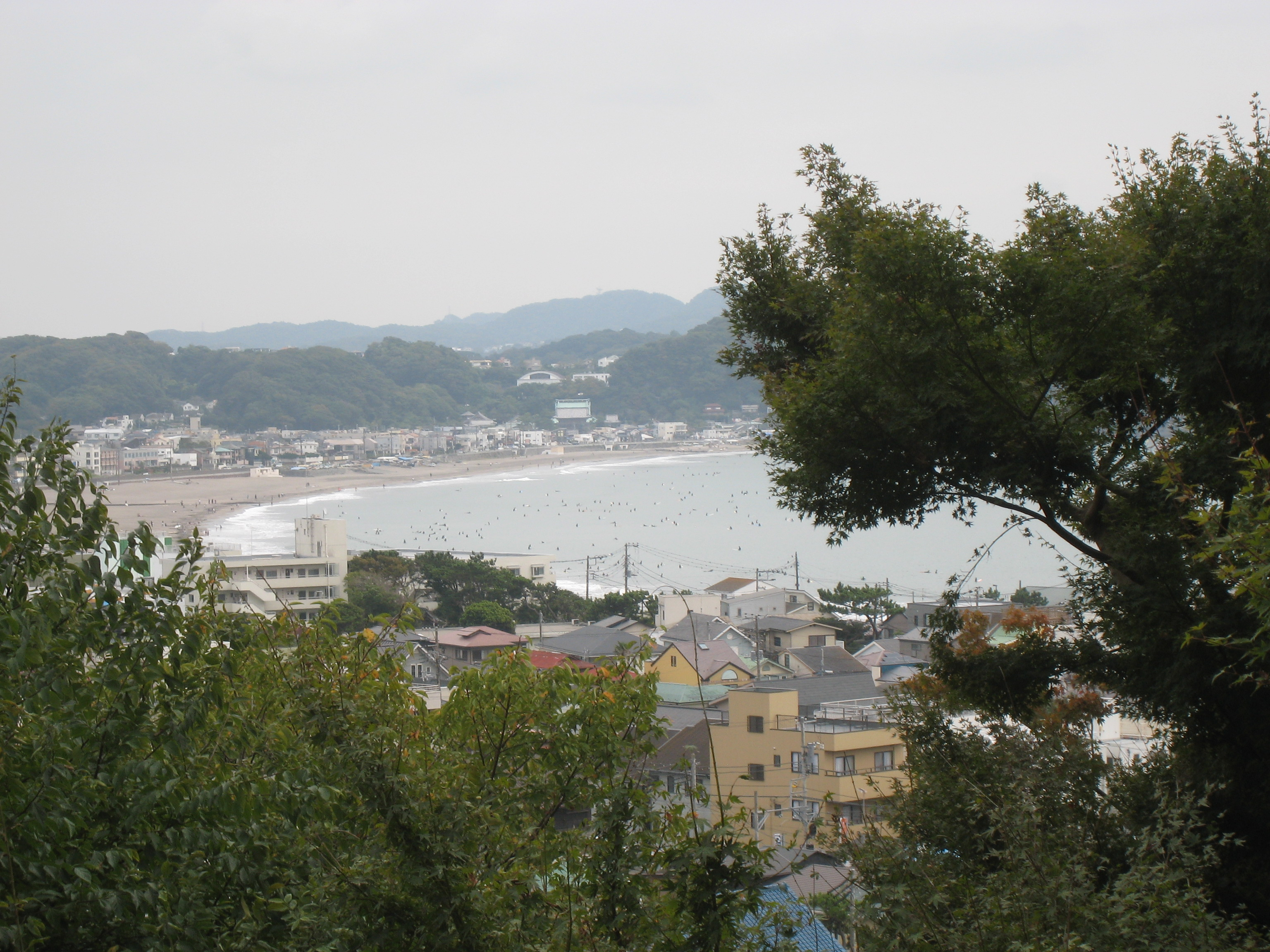
View over Kamakura's Sagami Bay

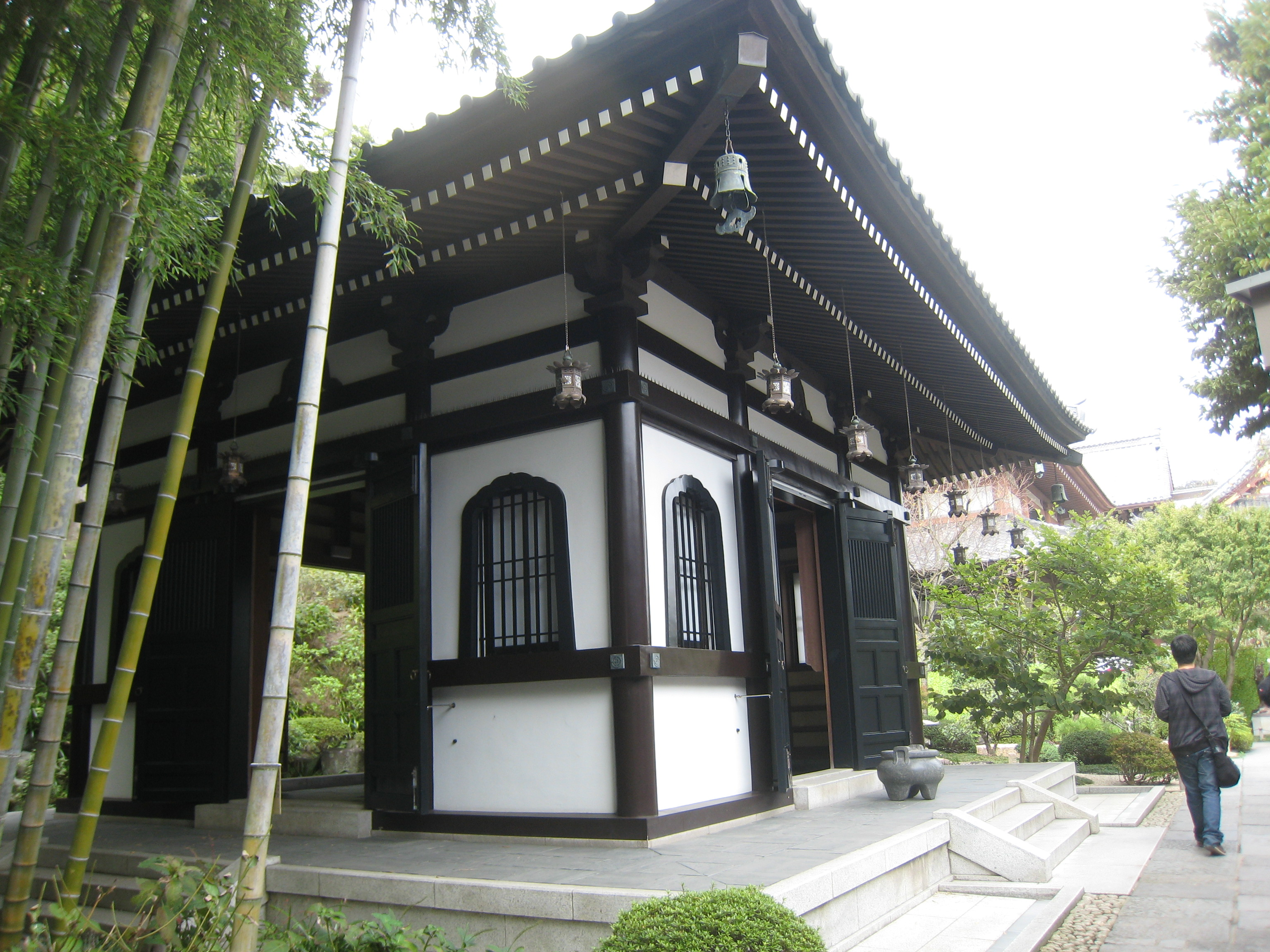
Kyōzō (Sutra Archive)

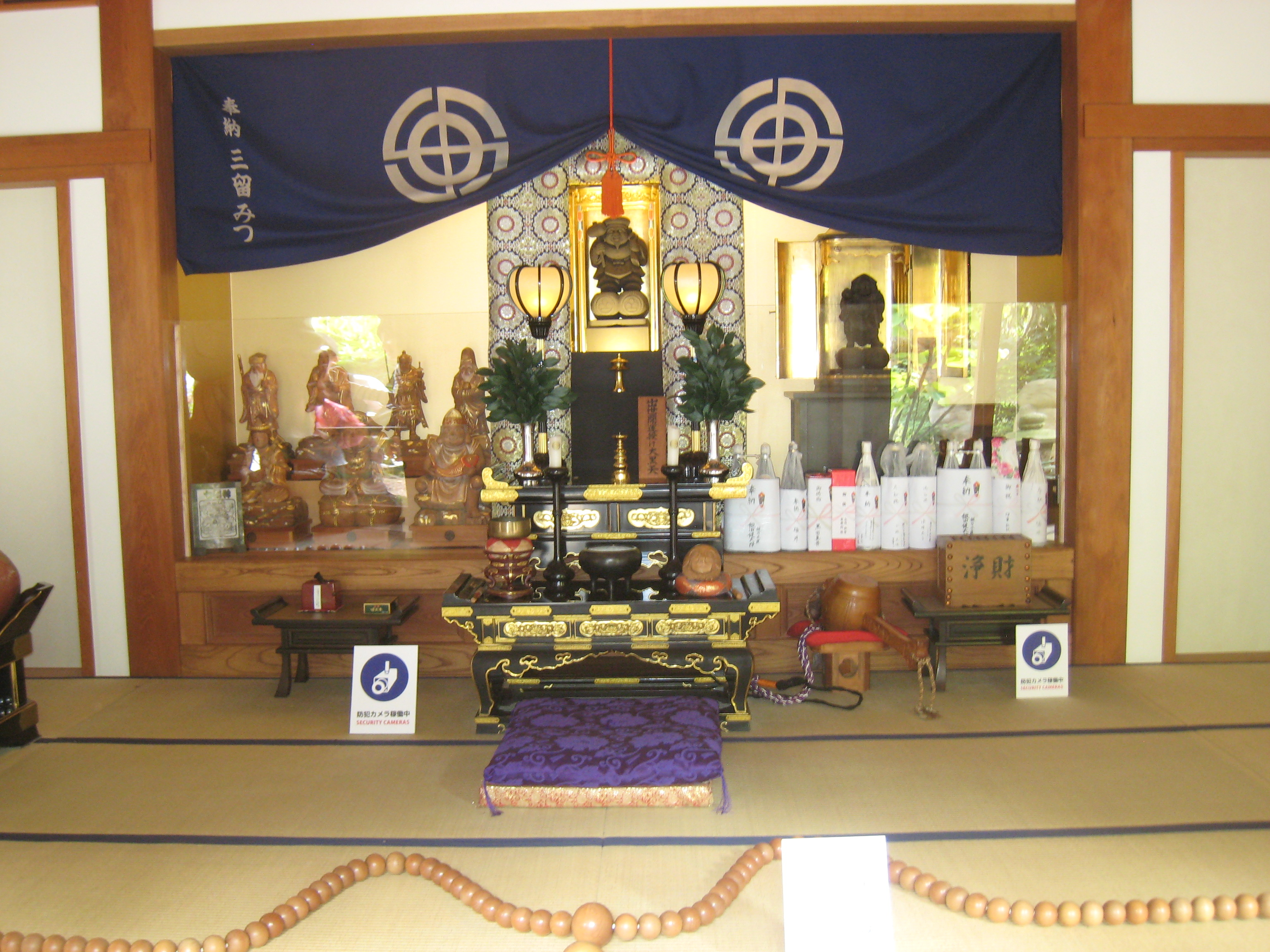
Daikoku-dō

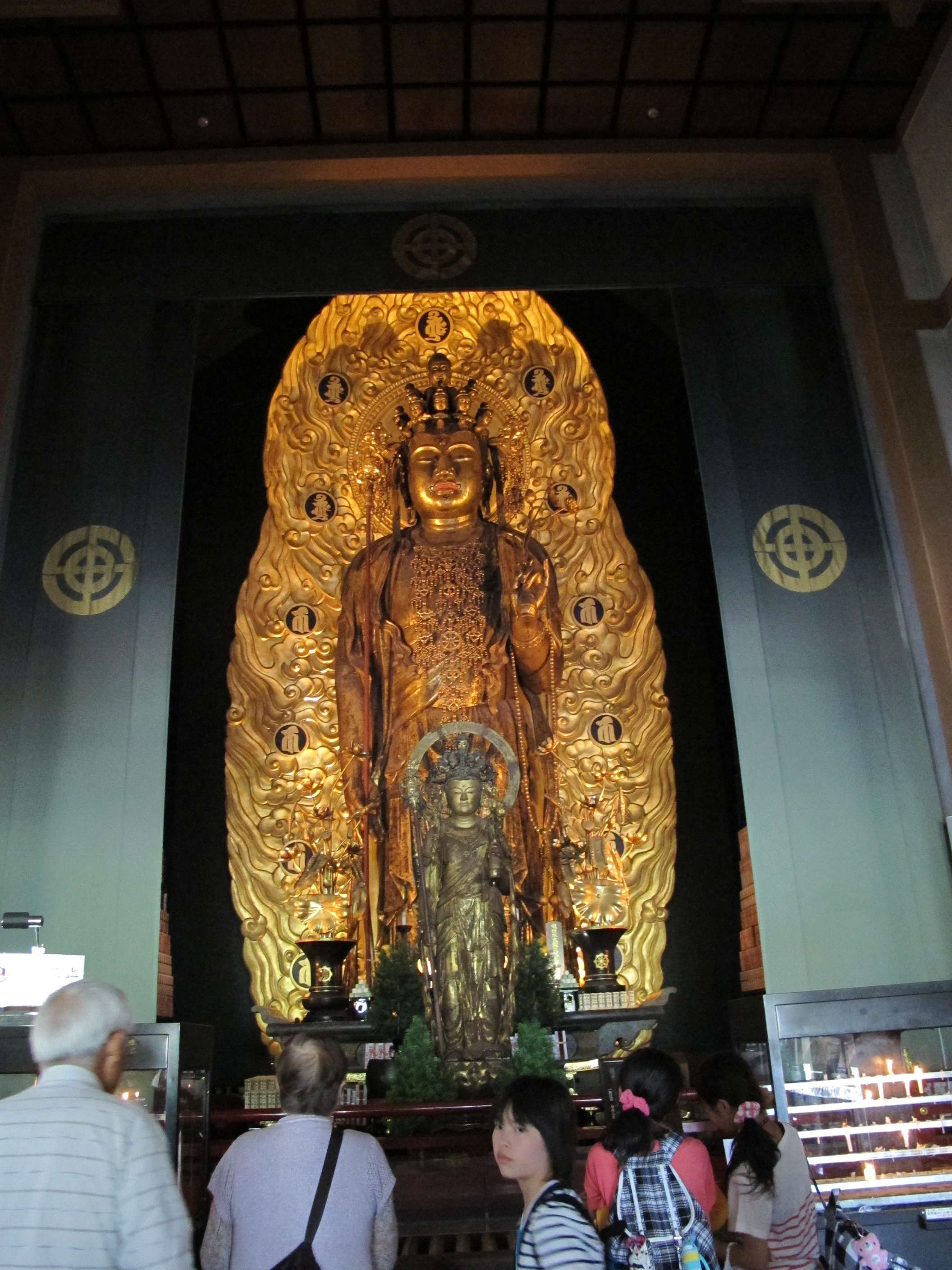
Jūichimen Kannon

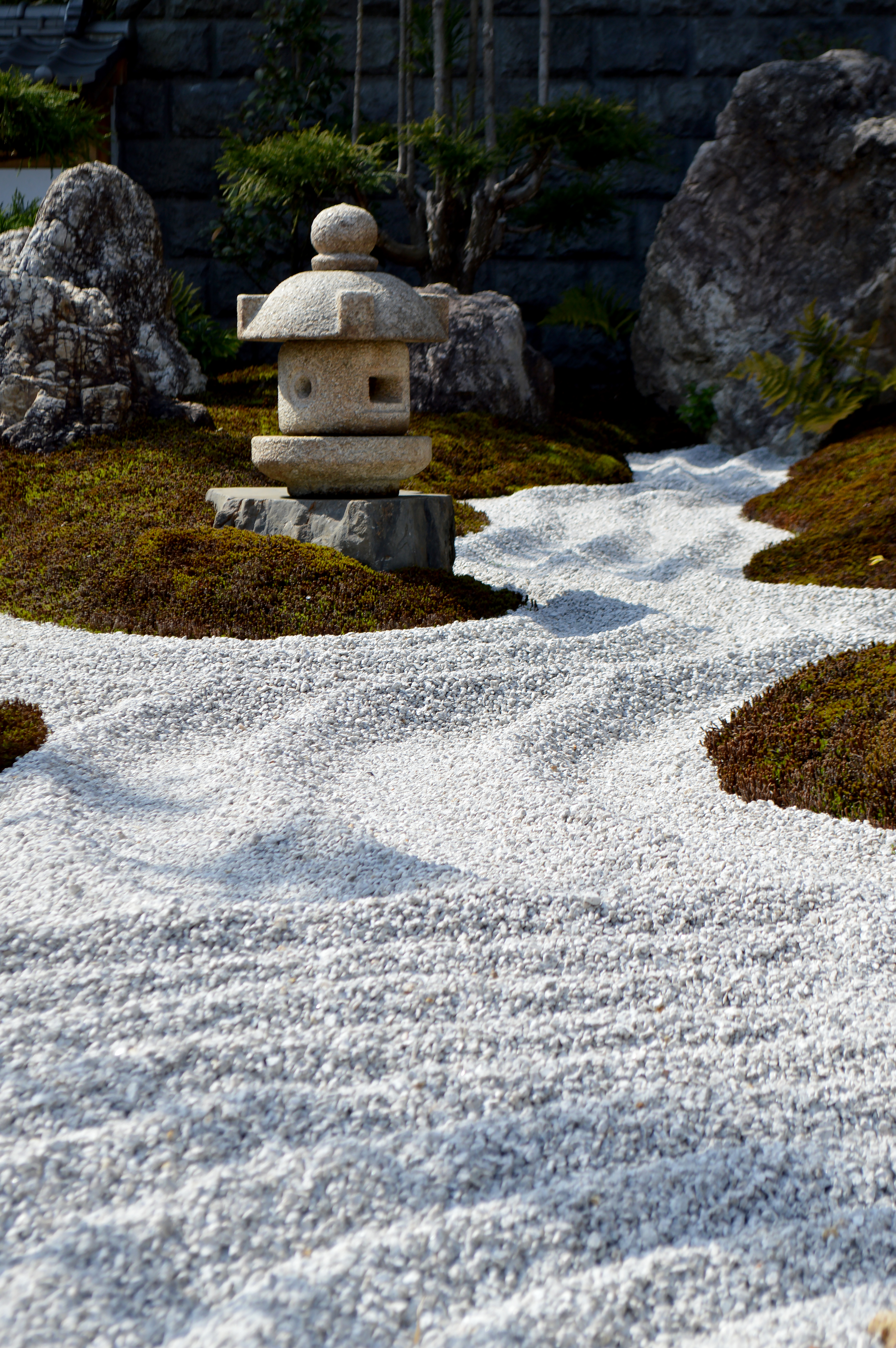
Rock garden

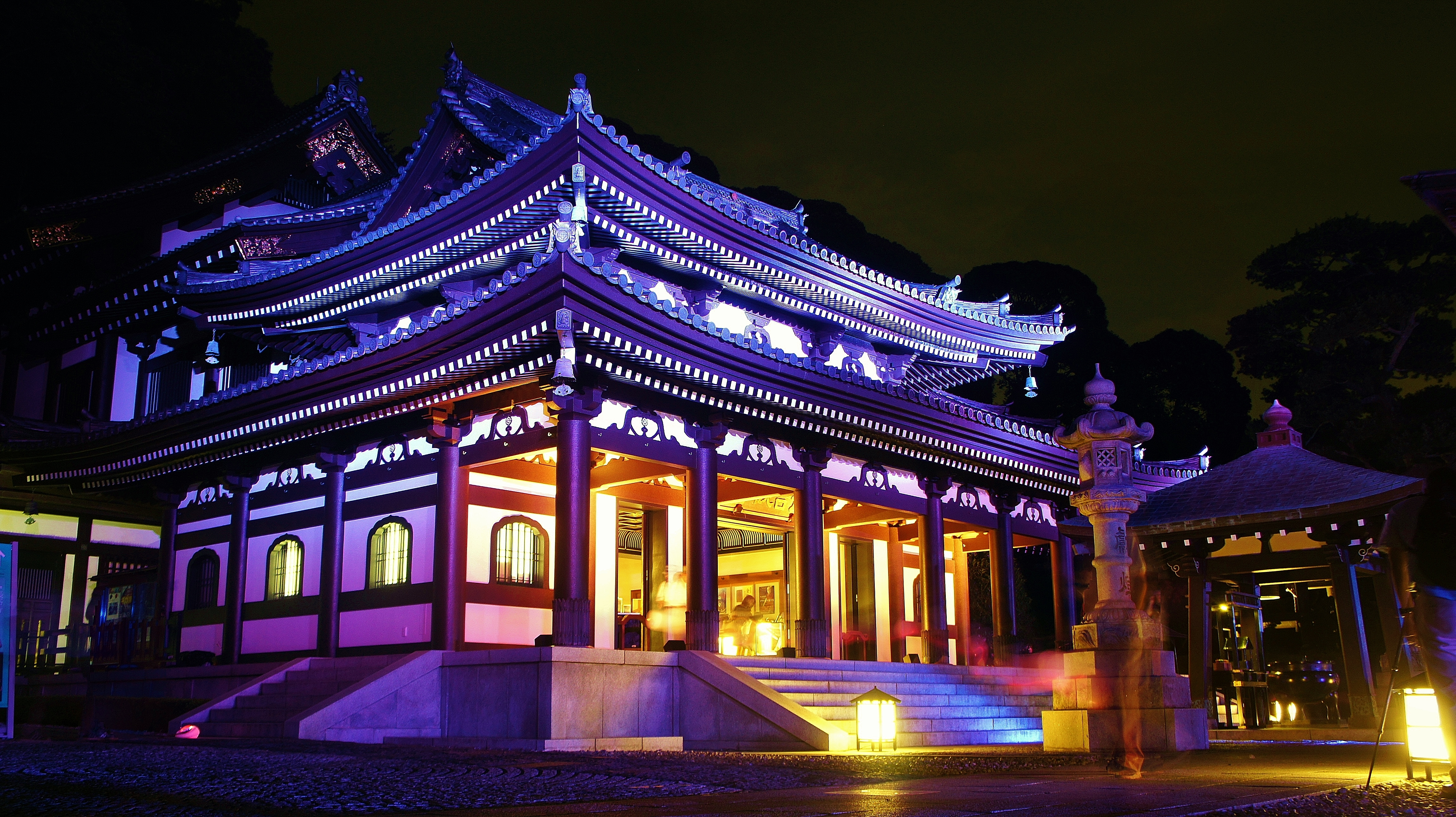
Illumination of Hasedera Temple in summer

=== Benten-Kutsu Cave ===
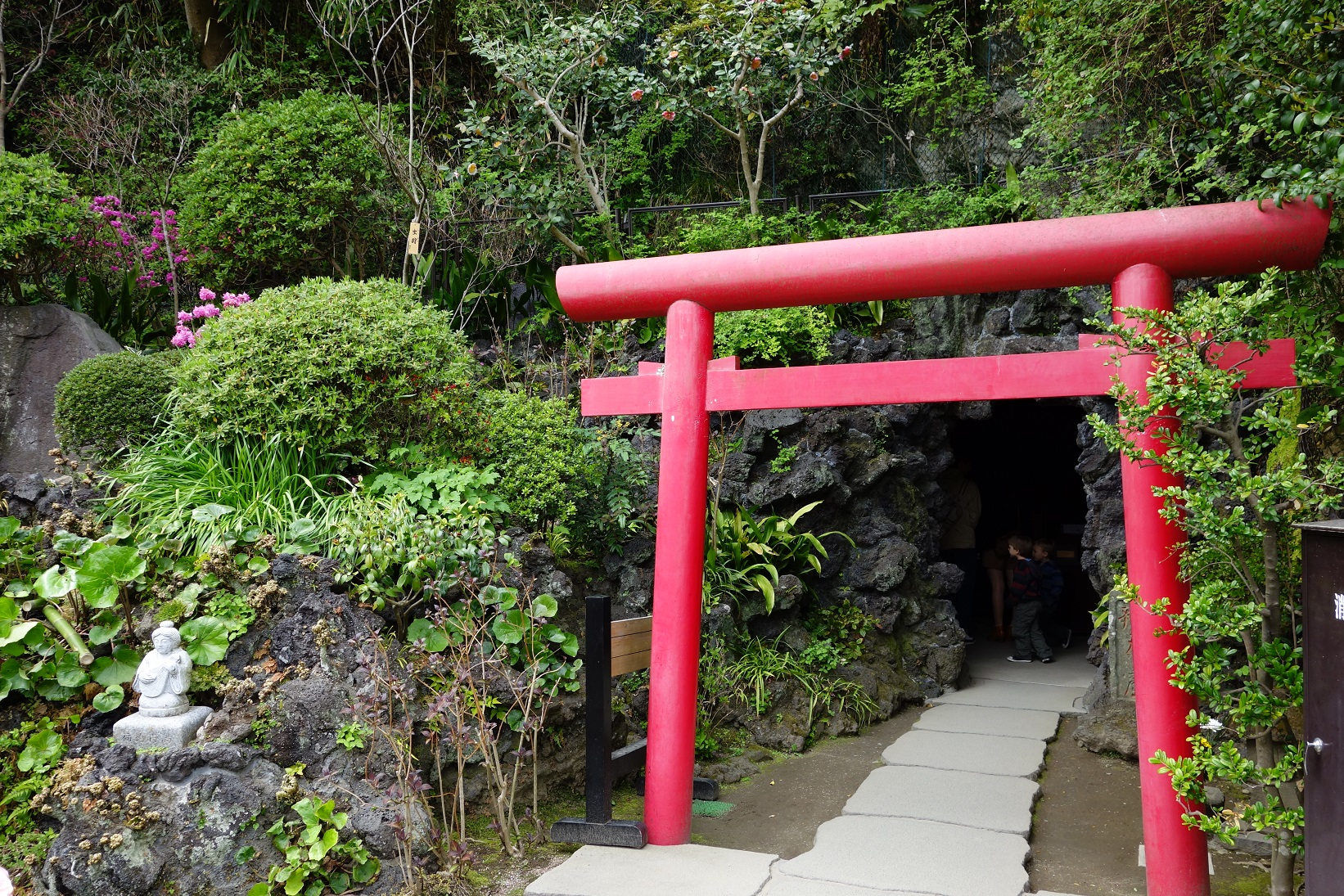
Entrance to the cave

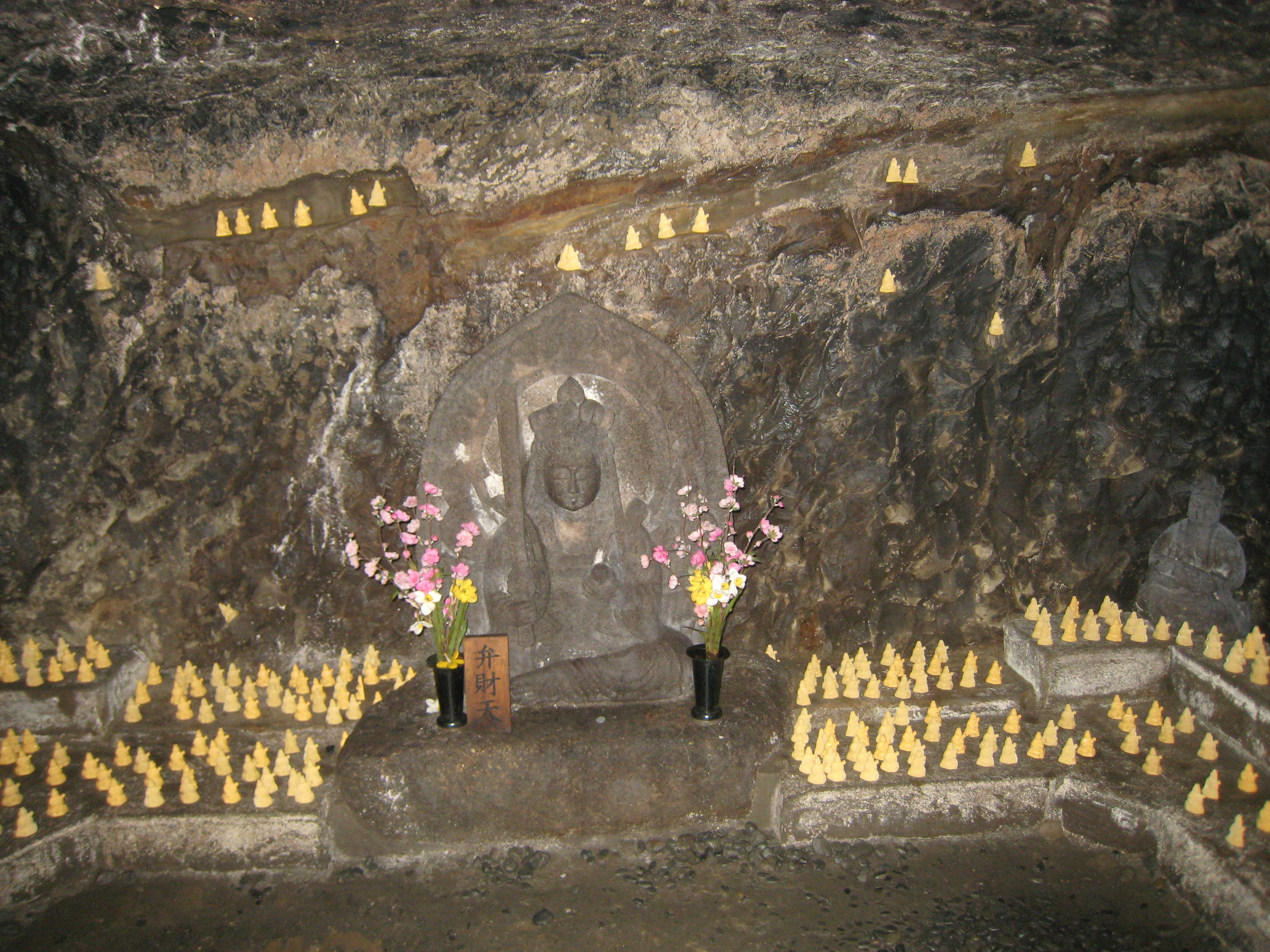
Statues of Benten

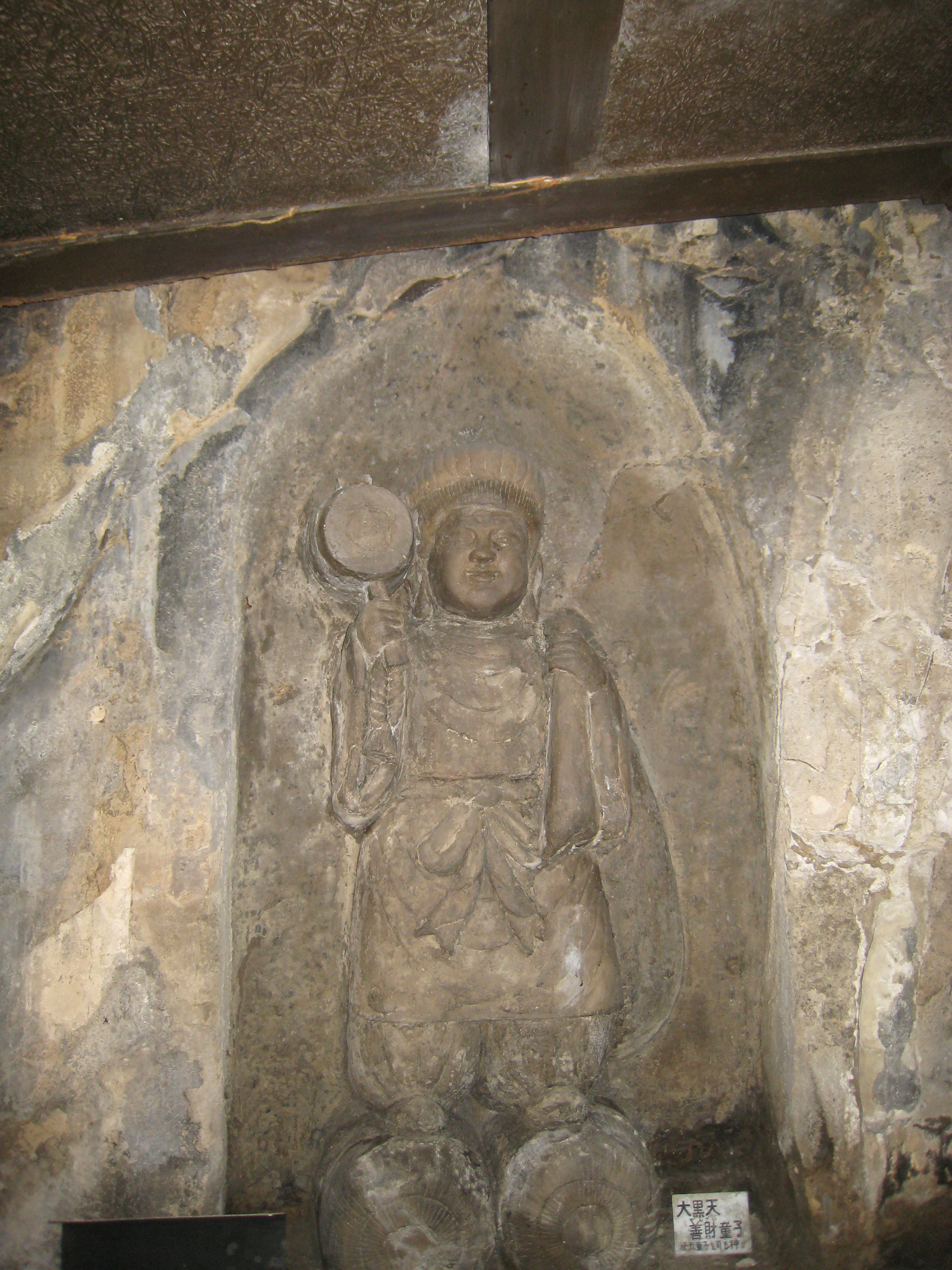
Bas-relief of Daikoku-ten

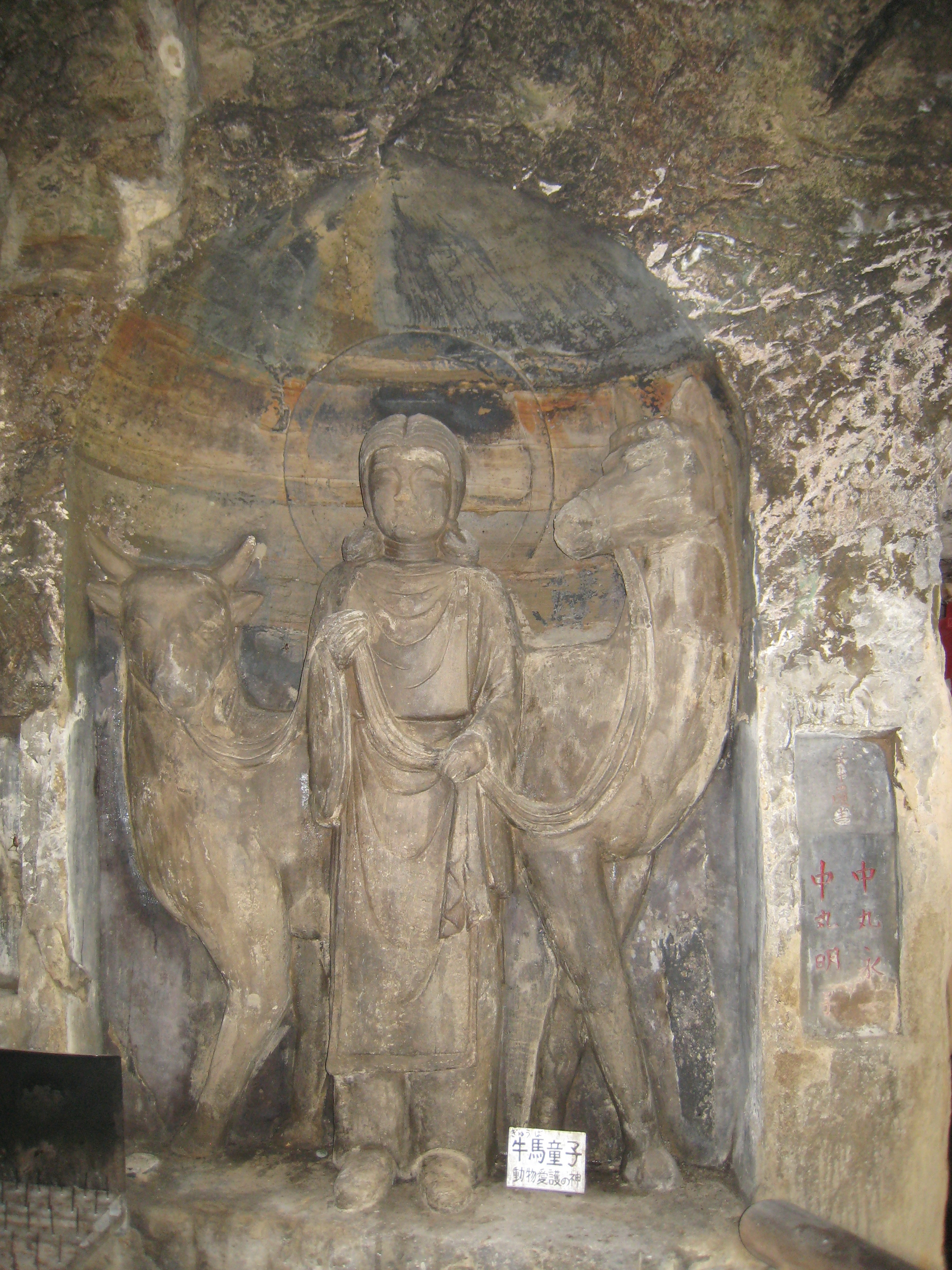
Bas-relief of Gyūba-dōji

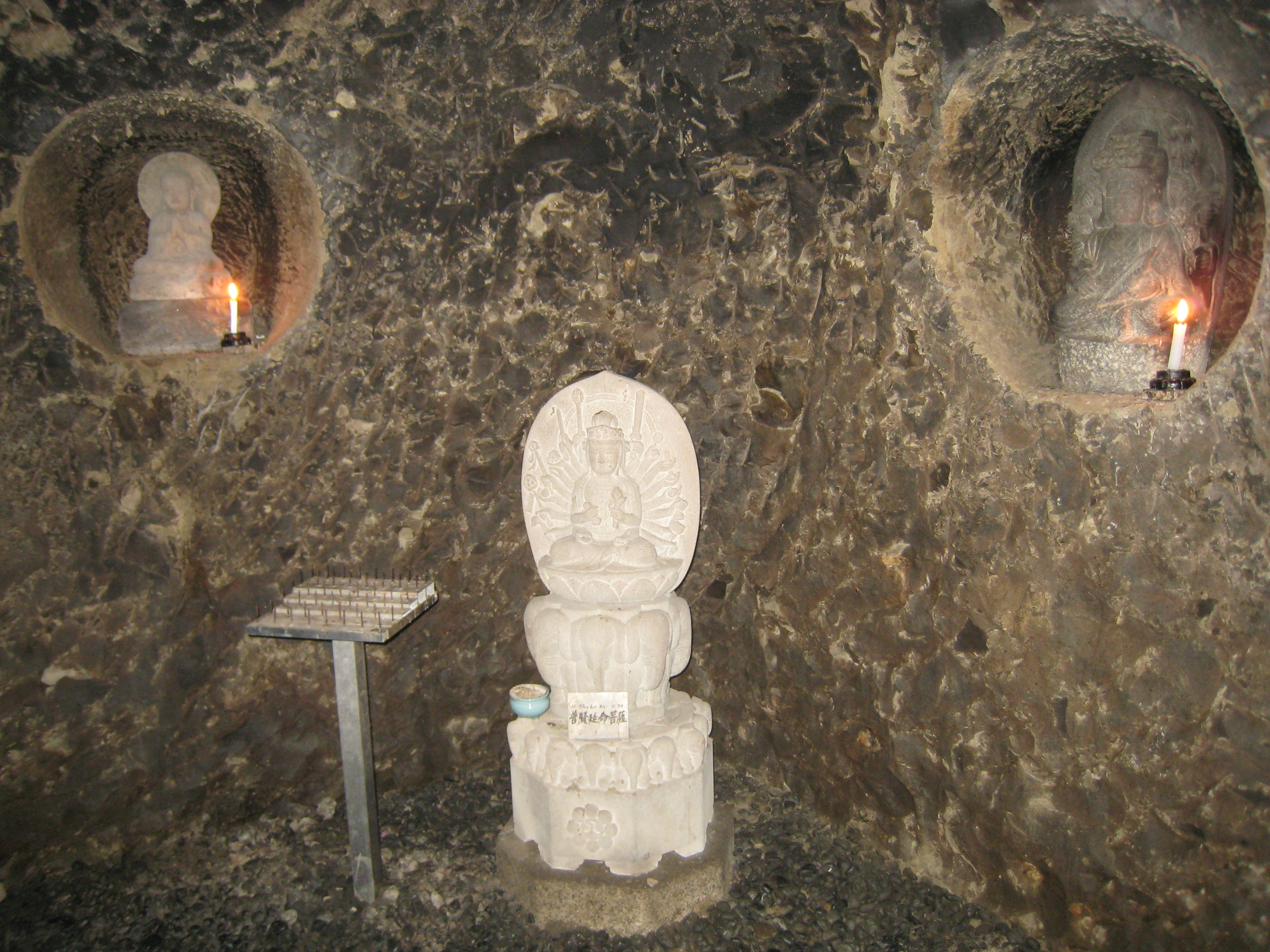
Different Buddhist deities

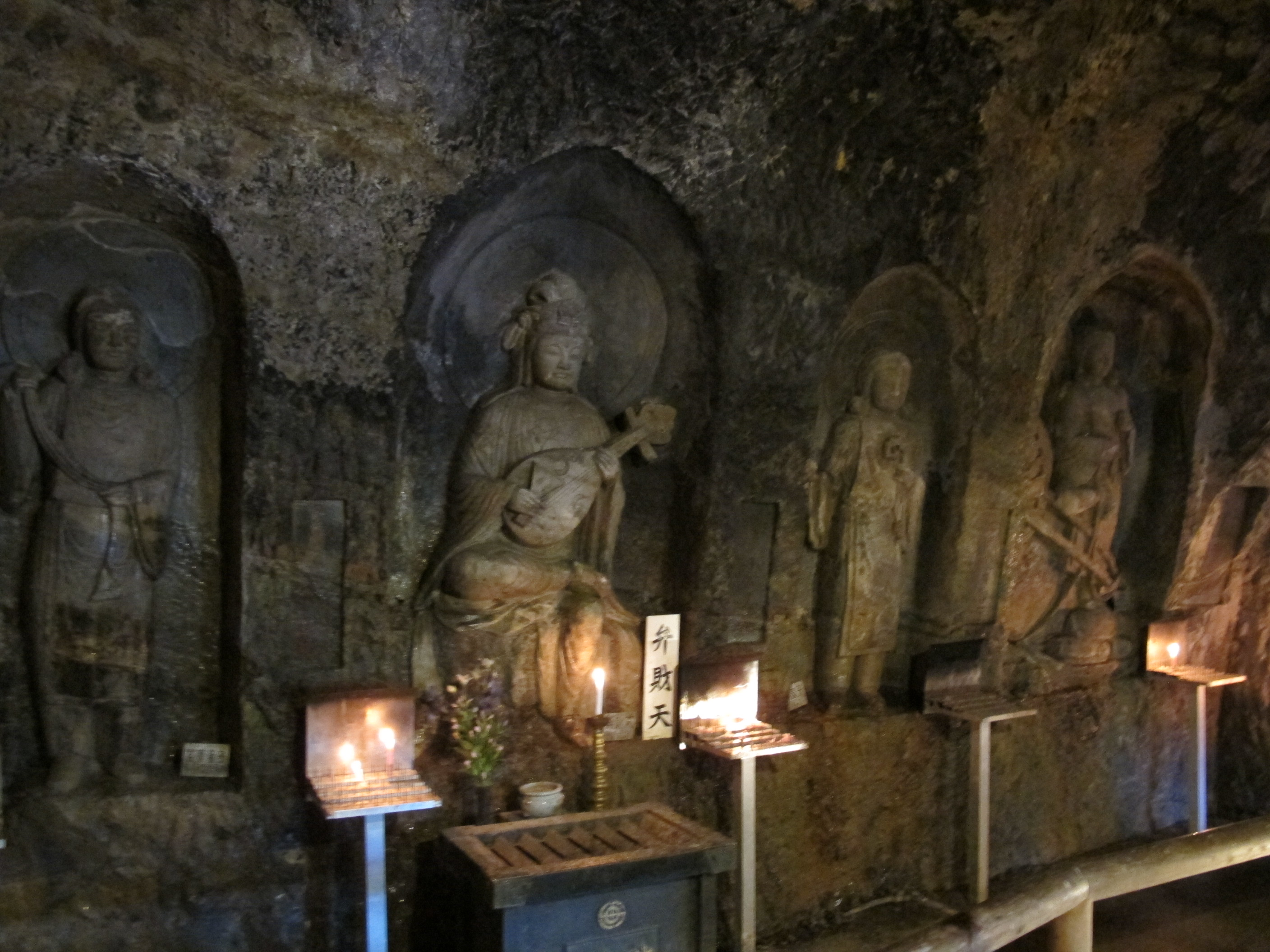
Benzaiten

== Access ==
Hase-dera is located a five minute walk from Hase Station, the third station from Kamakura along the Enoden railway line.
