= Rajiv Pant =

Executive, product designer, and engineer

- Born: October 16; Nainital, India
- Citizenship: American
- Education: MIT, Stanford, Yale
- Occupations: Chief technology and product officer, Wall Street Journal

Rajiv Pant is former Chief Product & Technology Officer of The Wall Street Journal, responsible for Product, Design, and Engineering. He reported jointly to the WSJ editor-in-chief Matt Murray and to parent Dow Jones corporate side. Pant was previously Chief Technology Officer of The New York Times, Vice President in Digital Technology at Condé Nast, and Chief Technology and Product Officer at Tribune Publishing. Before joining WSJ, he was Chief Technology and Product Officer at Thrive Global, Arianna Huffington's wellness venture. He is a member of the World Economic Forum’s Young Global Leaders community.

== Education ==
Pant went to Stanford University Graduate School of Business, MIT, and Yale University for Executive Education, Leadership, and Management between 2011 and 2015, as a member of programs ranging from Strategic Leadership of Technology and Innovation and Leadership and Decision Making in the 21st Century. He has certificates from MIT Sloan School of Management in Artificial Intelligence: Implications for Business Strategy, Innovation, Management and Leadership.

== Career and views ==
Pant began his career as Vice President, Director and Manager of Engineering at Knight Ridder, then went on to be CTO of COXnet for three years, during which he received the Newspaper Association of America’s 20 Under 40 Award. In 2007, he joined Condé Nast as their Vice President of Digital technology, then worked at The New York Times for 4 years and 2 months. He wrote about his decision to leave the Times for a startup in Quartz, saying:

I love The Times and its vision, and cherished my four years there. But, there was something missing in my career. I had been in CTO roles at four major media companies, with accomplishments I was proud of. However, I didn't want my 3 year old son Fitz Raj to know me for only being a successful corporate executive, but for accomplishing something significant for the greater good.

In 2014, he was honored as a Young Global Leader, a professional network by the World Economic Forum. It was during this time that he worked at The New York Times, going on to work for startup Some Spider as CPO, now serving in an advisory capacity. On February 1, 2017, Wall Street Journal editor Gerard Baker announced that Pant will be joining them as their inaugural Chief Product and Technology Officer.

== Recognition ==
- World Economic Forum as a Young Global Leader in 2014
- 20 Under 40, Newspaper Association of America, 20062
- Best Practice Awards in New Media, Newspaper Association of America, 2004
- Excellence Award for Technology Innovation, Knight Ridder, 2001
- Excellence Award for Technology Innovation, Knight Ridder, 1999
- Best Practice Award in New Media, Newspaper Association of America, 2001
