= Benten Botan =

Japanese manga series

- First tankōbon volume cover

弁天ぼたん
- Genre: Comedy
- Manga
- Written by: Nica Saida
- Published by: Shogakukan
- Magazine: Hibana
- Original run: April 7, 2016 – June 7, 2017
- Volumes: 2
- icon

Benten Botan (弁天ぼたん) is a Japanese manga series written and illustrated by Nica Saida. It was serialized in Shogakukan's seinen manga magazine Hibana from April 2016 to June 2017, with its chapters collected in two tankōbon volumes.

== Publication ==
Written and illustrated by Nica Saida, Benten Botan was serialized in Shogakukan's seinen manga magazine Hibana from April 7, 2016, to June 7, 2017. Shogakukan collected its chapters in two tankōbon volumes, released on November 11, 2016, and September 12, 2017.

=== Volumes ===
No.	Japanese release date	Japanese ISBN
1	November 11, 2017	978-4-09-187780-2
2	September 12, 2017	978-4-09-189619-3
