= Roscoe McGowen =

American journalist (1886–1966)

Roscoe Emmett McGowen (July 16, 1886 – November 5, 1966) was an American journalist and sportswriter. He spent the majority of his career as a writer for The New York Times, covering the Brooklyn Dodgers baseball team.

== Early life ==
McGowen was born on July 16, 1886, in Alta, Iowa. His first job was at age 13, as a reporter and printer's devil for The Walnut Grove Banner in Illinois. When his request for a raise was denied, he became a railroad telegrapher and dispatcher.

== Career ==
McGowen resumed his journalism career with the Rock Island Argus, also in Illinois. During that time he also made contributions to The Chicago Tribune and gained the notice of Joseph M. Patterson, who had founded the New York Daily News in 1919. Patterson hired McGowen at The News in 1922 to write editorials and movie reviews. McGowen moved to The Brooklyn Standard Union as a sports columnist and editor in 1928, and the following year, he joined The New York Times, where he remained for the next 30 years as a sports columnist, covering the Brooklyn Dodgers.

During spring training prior to the 1934 season, McGowen asked Bill Terry, manager of the New York Giants, about the National League pennant chances of the Dodgers, their crosstown rivals, prompting the reply, "Is Brooklyn still in the league?" Terry and the Giants came to rue that response. Although the Dodgers finished the season in sixth place, they beat the Giants in the last two games of the season, costing the Giants the National League pennant by one game.

Because McGowen's primary assignment was the Dodgers, he wrote columns for many of the team's most notable moments, including Mickey Owen's dropped third strike in Game 4 of the 1941 World Series, Jackie Robinson's major league debut, Cookie Lavagetto's hit that broke up Bill Bevens' near no-hitter in Game 4 of the 1947 World Series, no-hitters by Tex Carleton, Carl Erskine, and Sal Maglie, and the team's only World Series championship.

McGowen served as official scorer for several major league All-Star and World Series games. He was considered one of the most authoritative baseball writers in the nation, and served as national president of the Baseball Writers' Association of America in 1949. He was known for his dignified manner, appearance, speech, and basso-profundo singing, and could recite passages of Shakespeare at length. He retired from The Times in 1959.

== Personal life ==
McGowen married Maxine McVey, who predeceased him. Their son Deane also was a sportswriter for The Times.

== Death ==
McGowen died of lung cancer on November 5, 1966, in North Woodstock, Connecticut. He was survived by his son Deane, his daughter Dorothy Farrows, his sister, and three grandchildren.
