= Gilbert Cruz =

American book reviewer

Gilbert Cruz is an American critic currently serving as editor of The New York Times Book Review.

Cruz was born and raised in The Bronx and started his journalism career at The Tuscaloosa News. He next wrote for Entertainment Weekly and Time magazine. After serving as editorial director of Vulture, Cruz joined The New York Times in 2015 as an editor of its television coverage. In January 2018, he began leading the newspaper's coverage of arts and culture. In July 2022, Cruz was selected to replace Pamela Paul as editor of The New York Times Book Review after she left that position to become an opinion columnist for the newspaper. The announcement of his promotion cited his continually updated "The Essential Stephen King" article as proof of his book-reviewing skills.

In response to criticism that Paul had sidelined coverage of the broader publishing industry to solely focus on reviews, Cruz revived such coverage in the first year of his tenure. In his appointment, The New York Times specifically tasked Cruz with launching digital content to compete with BookTok, which has included poetry analysis designed for mobile devices. Cruz has also ended the occasional practice of assigning two critics to produce separate reviews, commenting that it created confusion among readers.
