= Greg Winter (journalist) =

American journalist (born 1970)

- Born: Gregory Fabian Winter; 1970 (age 55–56); New York City, U.S.
- Occupations: Journalist, former teacher, former director of public policy
- Notable credit(s): The New York Times, The Wall Street Journal, CBS Marketwatch
- Spouse: Monica Drake

Gregory Fabian Winter (born 1970 in Brooklyn, New York) is an American journalist who is the deputy editor of the International Desk of The New York Times. He was the head of The New York Times coverage of the Ebola epidemic in Africa, which won a Pulitzer Prize for International Reporting in 2015. He was previously an education correspondent for the Times from 2002 to 2005. Winter began at the Times as an intern in 2000, then was a financial reporter from 2000 to 2002.

Winter received a B.A. in architecture from Brown University in 1992. From 1991 to 1992, he was an adult education teacher. From 1994 to 1998, he was director of public policy at the Hamilton Family Center in San Francisco.

He received his master's in journalism from the University of California, Berkeley in 2000, after which he had internships at CBS Marketwatch, The Wall Street Journal and the Times.

== Personal ==
In 2006, Winter married Monica Drake, now a deputy managing editor at the print masthead of The New York Times. They reside in Brooklyn.
