= Andrew Kramer =

American journalist

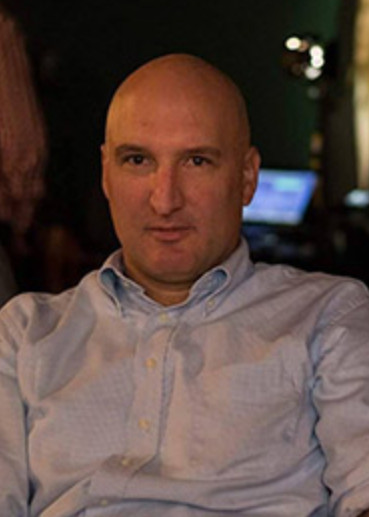
- Born: Oakland, California, USA
- Education: University of California, Santa Cruz (BA); University of Oxford (MA)
- Occupation: Journalist
- Employer: The New York Times
- Awards: Pulitzer Prize for International Reporting (2017, 2023)

Andrew E. Kramer is an American journalist who works as the chief of The New York Times Kyiv bureau.

He has won two Pulitzer Prizes for International Reporting for his coverage of Russia.

== Biography ==
Andrew Kramer was born in Oakland, California, and grew up in Ukiah. He later moved to Santa Cruz to study engineering, but ended up getting a bachelor's degree in history from the Santa Cruz University in 1994.

At the start of his career, he wrote for the campus newspaper, City on a Hill Press, and for the Ukiah Daily Journal. He then moved to Russia to teach English, where he became a researcher for The Washington Post Moscow Bureau. After earning a master's degree in 20th-century history from Oxford, he joined the Associated Press, working in Portland, New York, and eventually returning to Russia. In 2005, he joined The New York Times's International desk. Prior to joining The Times, Kramer contributed freelance reports to the San Francisco Chronicle.

As a reporter for the NYT, Andrew Kramer covered multiple topics, such as the war in Afghanistan, the oil trade, the Iraq War, the 2013-2014 protests in Ukraine, LGBTQ rights in Chechnya, and political assassinations in Russia. In 2017, Kramer, together with his colleagues, won a Pulitzer Prize for International Reporting for stories covering Russian covert operations, such as hackers, assassination squads, and how Russia took advantage of Paul Manafort's corruption.

After Russia invaded Ukraine in 2022, The New York Times established a bureau in Kyiv, appointing Andrew Kramer as its chief. In his role, he oversees a dozen reporters and photographers who cover events of the war. He is also assisted by five local Ukrainian journalists and translators. Articles are published only with the approval of the editors, most of whom are in New York or London.

He signed a petition calling on Russian authorities to free the imprisoned American journalist Evan Gershkovich. In 2024, Kramer was sanctioned by Russia.

== Reception ==
Andrew Kramer was accused by Ukrainian journalists of viewing Ukraine through a colonial lens. He allegedly served Russian propaganda by "reporting from both sides" and calling the war in the Donbas "separatist", which downplayed Russia's role in it.

The editor-in-chief of Russian media outlet Meduza accused Kramer of plagiarizing the work that led to his 2017 Pulitzer Prize. The New York Times denied the accusations.

His coverage of the Russo-Ukrainian War led to another Pulitzer Prize for International Reporting in 2023.
