= R. Anthony Benten =

American businessman

Robert Anthony Benten is vice president and treasurer of The New York Times Company as of November 2003. He became treasurer of the Times Company in November 2001. Previously he served as assistant treasurer since September 1997 and as director of treasury since January 1997.

Before that, he held various positions at the Company including: manager of finance and pension investment, 1993-1996; supervisor of financial analysis and pensions, treasury department, 1992-1993; senior financial analyst, Forest Products Group, 1991-1992, and financial analyst, treasury department, 1989-1991.

Prior to joining the Company, Benten was an accountant at Deloitte & Touche LLP from 1987 to 1989.

Benten received a B.S. degree in finance from Louisiana State University in 1985 and earned an M.B.A. degree from Rice University in 1987, with concentrations in accounting and finance.
