= Sewamono =

Genre of contemporary setting plays in Japanese traditional theatre

Sewamono (世話物) is a genre of contemporary setting plays in Japanese traditional theatre. The term applies to both bunraku and kabuki. The genre is in contrast to "period setting plays" or jidaimono. Though the distinction between "historical" and "contemporary" is not exact, and there are also plays that do not fit either category.

Sewamono plays are naturalistic and set in contemporary normal environments rather than the historical and samurai-oriented plays typical of the bombastic aragoto style. In the conflicted lovers genre, such as The Love Suicides at Sonezaki, conflict between emotions (ninjo) and social pressure (giri) form the motor of the plot. The engirimono, or "knot-cutting", referring to the “drama of cutting the lovers' knot" such as Namiki Gohei's Godairiki Koi no Fujime is a subcategory of sewamono.
