= Four Major Plays of Chikamatsu =

1961 book of Japanese plays translated into English

- "Behind the scenes at an Edo puppet theater of 1690"
- Author: Chikamatsu Monzaemon; Keene wrote the Preface, the Introduction, and the two appendices
- Translator: Donald Keene
- Illustrator: Not listed
- Cover artist: Benjamin S. Farber
- Language: English
- Series: as "Major Plays of Chikamatsu", was Number LXVI of the "Records of Civilization Sources and Studies"; it was also included in the "Japanese Translations Series" of the UNESCO Collection of Representative Works. Also part of Columbia University Press's "Translations from the Asian Classics"
- Genre: Drama
- Publisher: Columbia University Press
- Publication date: the 4 plays, 1961; with Preface, 1998
- Publication place: USA
- Media type: Print (softcover )
- Pages: 220 pages
- ISBN: 0-231-11101-0 (1998 Columbia University Press edition)
- OCLC: 37904817
- Dewey Decimal: 895.6/232 21
- LC Class: PL793.4 .A6 1998

Four Major Plays of Chikamatsu is a collection of four major dramas by the famous Japanese playwright Chikamatsu Monzaemon. The four plays were first translated by Donald Keene in 1961, and have appeared in various collections and books over the years; Four Major Plays contains a Preface, an Introduction, and two appendices in addition, and is published by Columbia University Press.

The Preface gives a more popular account of matters, mentioning that Keene's translations of the plays have actually been performed; the lengthy introduction gives a brief biographical sketch of Chikamatsu and a discussion of various literary features and other background useful for understanding Chikamatsu's plays.

== Contents ==
=== Plays ===
- The Love Suicides at Sonezaki (Sonezaki Shinjū)
- The Battles of Coxinga (Kokusenya Kassen)
- The Uprooted Pine (Nebiki no Kadomatsu)
- The Love Suicides at Amijima (Shinjū Ten no Amijima)

=== Appendices ===
The two appendices are:

- A Note on Prostitution in Chikamatsu's Plays
- Contemporary Puppet Performances of Chikamatsu's Plays
