= The Courier for Hell =

1711 Japanese tragedy by Chikamatsu Monzaemon

The Courier for Hell or Courier of Hell (Meido no hikyaku 冥途の飛脚) is a love-suicide play by the Japanese writer Chikamatsu Monzaemon, written in 1711. It follows a similar storyline to some of his other love-suicide plays, including The Love Suicides at Sonezaki and The Love Suicides at Amijima. The Courier for Hell was based on real events that took place in Osaka in 1710. It is one of the most celebrated of his domestic plays.

== Plot ==
The Courier for Hell centers around Chubei, an adopted son of a hikyaku courier located in Osaka, who is in love with the prostitute Umegawa. He begins using customers' money to buy out her contract before another man can do so. Chubei's friend Hachiemon attempts to stop Chubei's behavior by informing her fellow prostitutes and mistress of what is going on, but it instead incites Chubei to break the seal on 300 gold pieces belonging to an important samurai, a crime punishable by death. The two escape Osaka together and head towards Chubei's hometown, dying together in the mountains.

=== Act 1 ===
The play opens with a clerk at the Kameya courier house dealing with customers who are irritated because their monetary deliveries are late from the capital. The clerk apologizes profusely to a young samurai, saying the shipments are delayed because of the rain, and he will have his money soon. Chubei's adopted mother expresses confusion and disappointment over the many delayed payments, and worries over the reputation of their courier house, which had always been outstanding up to this point. She tries to find out from the clerk what is going on, since Chubei is going out quite often. She expresses puzzlement over the fact that Chubei leaves with three packages of tissue and brings none home; "How can he blow his nose so much?"

In actuality, the adopted son of the owner, Chubei, has been embezzling customers' money. He has used 50 gold pieces to put a down payment on buying out the contract of Umegawa, a prostitute he is in love with. The narrator informs us that the tissues are used to mop up after sexual activity.

Chubei arrives back from the pleasure quarters and runs into his friend Hachiemon, who is there to demand the money Chubei owes him. Chubei makes excuses, but eventually breaks down and confesses that he spent Hachiemon's money trying to buy out Umegawa's contract. Hachiemon says that he is impressed at the courage it took Chubei to make his confession and forgives the debt. However, as he goes to leave, Chubei's mother comes out and orders Chubei to give Hachiemon his money. Since there is no money to give, Chubei wraps up a jar and gives it to Hachiemon. At his mother's insistence, Chubei has Hachiemon write a note for receipt of the money, though since she is illiterate, the note actually says that he did not receive the money.

After Hachiemon leaves, the couriers arrive from Edo carrying money for numerous customers, including 300 gold pieces for a samurai and about 800 gold pieces for other customers. Chubei decides he will take the money to the samurai right away, but instead finds himself walking towards Umegawa in the pleasure quarters. He argues with himself, trying to decide what to do. The act ends with him deciding to go to see Umegawa.

=== Act 2 ===
The second act begins in the pleasure quarters; Umegawa has just arrived back and laments to the other girls that she is afraid Chubei's competition will be able to buy her. She finds him boring and would be distressed if he won her contract.

Hachiemon arrives outside and tells the girls and Umegawa's mistress what is going on with Chubei, and shows them the jar Chubei gave him to fool his mother. He urges them not to accept any more of Chubei's money, for fear that Chubei will ruin himself. Chubei arrives and overhears much of this. His pride is hurt, and despite Hachiemon's and Umegawa's urgings, he breaks the seal on the samurai's money in order to throw the money he owes at Hachiemon. He then uses the rest of the money to buy out Umegawa's contract, and once she understands what has happened, they flee together out of Osaka.

The final scene is considered a dance sequence and requires additional shamisen players and narrators. Umegawa and Chubei are taken by palanquin out of Osaka and into the mountains. Chubei pays the palanquin bearers and they depart; Umegawa and Chubei continue on foot. Chubei tries to protect Umegawa from the elements as long as he can while it starts snowing in earnest. Eventually the two succumb to the elements and die.

== Performances ==
The Australian National University's Za Kabuki performed a version of the play in 2004, directed by Shun Ikeda.
