= Sonezaki Shinjū (disambiguation) =

Sonezaki Shinjū (曽根崎心中) may refer to:

- The Love Suicides at Sonezaki, a 1703 play by Chikamatsu Monzaemon
- The Love Suicides at Sonezaki (1978 film), directed by Yasuzo Masumura
- The Love Suicides at Sonezaki (1981 film), directed by Midori Kurisaki
