= Shinjū =

Group suicide of people bound by love

Shinjū (心中) is a Japanese term meaning "double suicide", used in common parlance to refer to any group suicide of two or more individuals bound by love, typically lovers, parents and children, and even whole families. A double suicide without consent is called muri-shinjū (無理心中) and it is considered as a sort of murder–suicide.

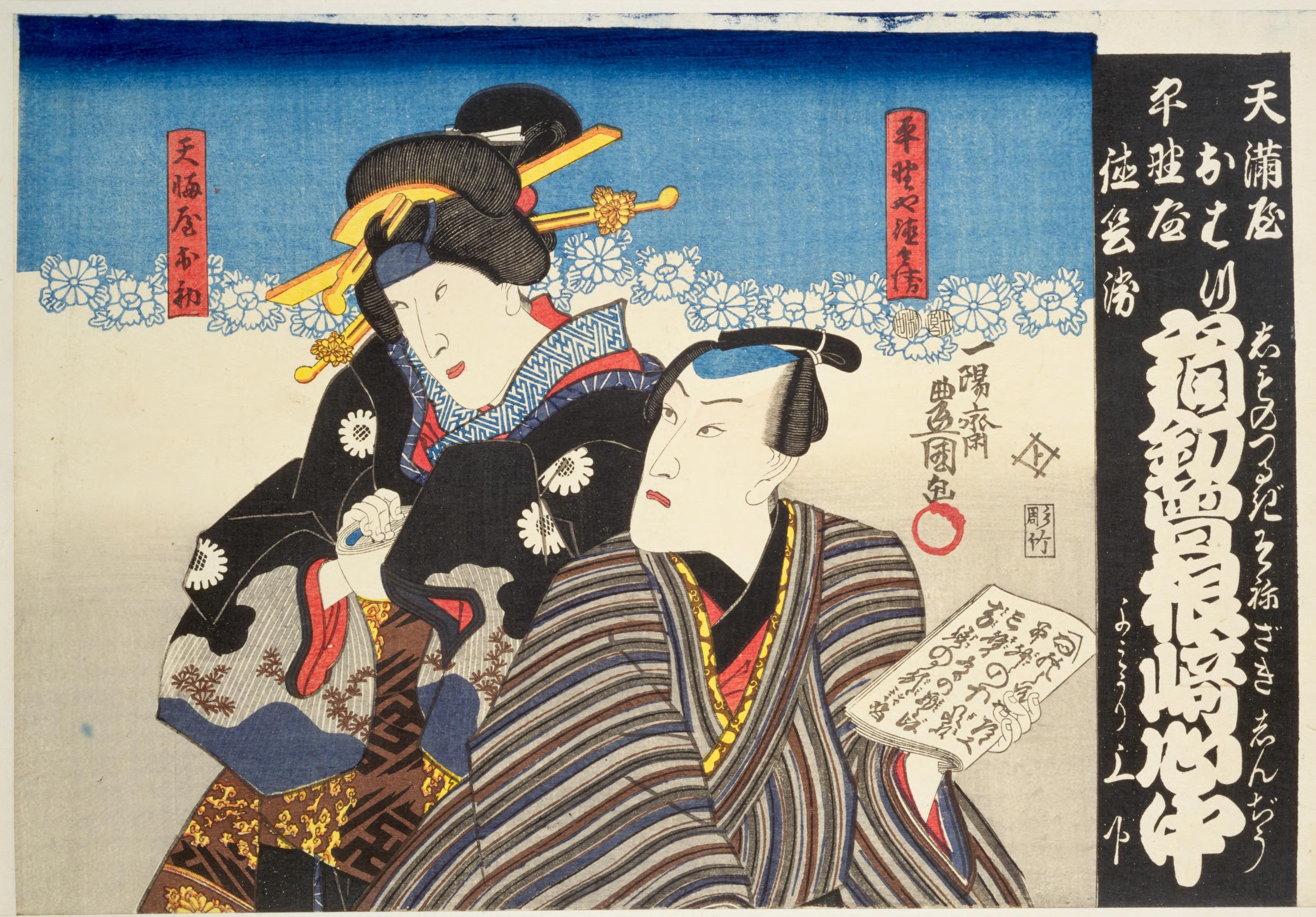
Ukiyo-e by Utagawa Kunisada depicting "The Love Suicides at Sonezaki"

Lovers committing double suicide believed that they would be united again in heaven, a view supported by feudal teaching in Edo period Japan, which taught that the bond between two lovers is continued into the next world, and by the teaching of Pure Land Buddhism wherein it is believed that through double suicide, one can approach rebirth in the Pure Land.

== Etymology ==
The word shinjū is formed by the characters for "mind/heart" (心) and "center/inside" (中). In this usage it literally means "heart-inside" or "oneness of hearts", probably reflecting a psychological link between the participants.

== In popular culture ==
In Japanese theater and literary tradition, double suicides are the simultaneous suicides of two lovers whose personal feelings (人情, ninjō) or love for one another are at odds with giri, social conventions or familial obligations. Double suicides were rather common in Japan throughout history and double suicide is an important theme of the puppet theater repertory. The tragic denouement is usually known to the audience and is preceded by a michiyuki, a small poetical journey, where lovers evoke the happier moments of their lives and their attempts at loving each other.

The term plays a central role in works such as Shinjū Ten no Amijima (The Love Suicides at Amijima), written by the seventeenth-century tragedian Chikamatsu Monzaemon for the bunraku puppet theater. It would later be adapted as a film in 1969 under the title Double Suicide in English, in a modernist adaptation by the filmmaker Masahiro Shinoda, including a score by Toru Takemitsu.

In the preface for Donald Keene's book Bunraku, writer Jun'ichirō Tanizaki complained about the too-long endings known to be common in double suicide plays. In his novel Some Prefer Nettles, he parodies the notion of shinjū and gives it a social and sensual double suicide with no clear ending.

== See also ==
- The Love Suicides at Sonezaki (1978 film)
- Suicide in Japan
- Suicide pact
- Yanaka five-storied pagoda double-suicide arson case
- Lover's Leap
