= Hikyaku =

Historical courier system in Japan

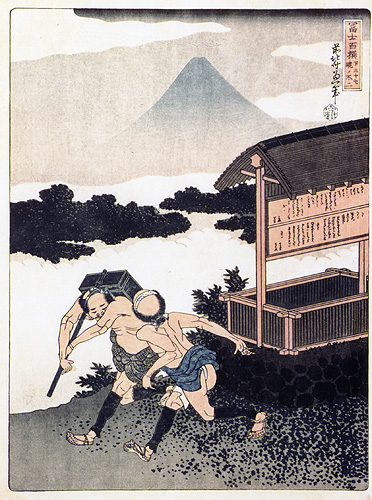
Hikyaku from 1834 woodblock print by Katsushika Hokusai (1760–1849).

Hikyaku (飛脚) were couriers in Japan who carried letters, documents, bills of exchange, and packages, using a system of relay stations under the bakufu military governments, beginning in the Kamakura period (1185–1333), gradually yielding to more modern systems beginning in 1858.

== Kamakura period ==
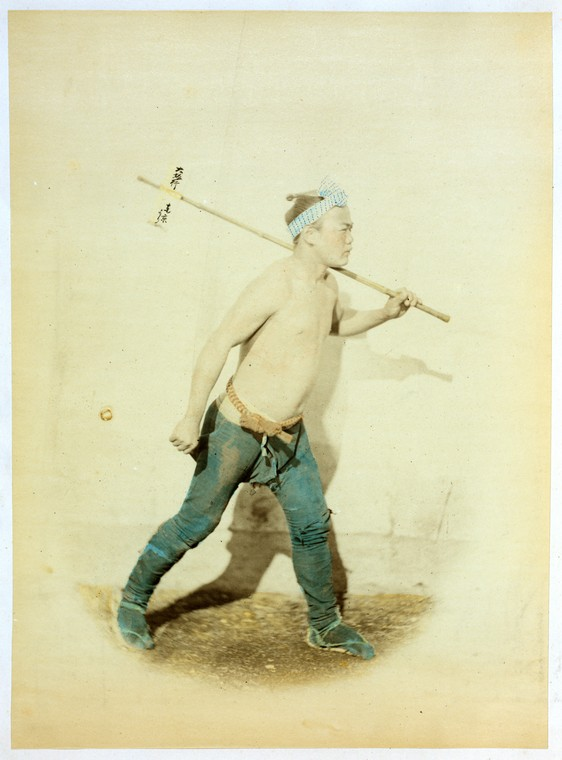
Courier or postman, Japan, hand-coloured albumen print by Felice Beato, between 1863 and 1877

During the Asuka period the government established a system called Five Home Provinces and Seven Circuits, served by messengers known as ekishi (駅使) who carried special post station bells (駅鈴, ekirei). This system had broken down by the time of the Kamakura period. The Kamakura shogunate established a relay system (Roppara hikyaku) of horse-riders and stages that would carry messages from the Rokuhara Tandai headquarters (in the Higashiyama area of Kyoto) to Kamakura, sometimes within 72 hours.

== Edo period ==
The hikyaku system reached a degree of sophistication that led to The Japanese Letter-Writing Era, beginning about 1721.

There were many different types of hikyaku, including:

- Tsugi-bikyaku (継飛脚), only available to high-ranking bakufu officials such as Rōjū (elder statesmen), the Kyoto Shoshidai (Kyoto Deputy), the Osaka jōdai (Governor of Osaka Castle), the governor of Sunpu Castle, Kanjō-bugyō (financial magistrates), and others of Bugyō (magistrate) status.
- Daimyo-bikyaku (大名飛脚): couriers established by individual Daimyo (feudal lords) to carry messages between their domains and the domainal residence in Edo, and sometimes also to their rice warehouses in port cities.
- Kome-bikyaku (米飛脚): couriers who carried news about rice prices from the Dōjima Rice Exchange in Osaka to interested parties elsewhere.
- Hikyaku tonya (飛脚問屋) or 飛脚屋 (hikyaku-ya), commercial message-carrying services available to everyone else.
- Tooshi-bikyaku (通飛脚): a single runner who carried a message or parcel, without relay, from the sender to the addressee.
- Machi-bikyaku (町飛脚): specialized runners within the Edo Bakufu, much used during the waning years of the Edo Bakufu. With bells jingling from their message boxes, they were called "chirin chirin no machi-bikyaku" by the townsfolk. According to the Morisada Mango of 1837, "Their appearance was thus: the message box was painted in persimmon ink, the courier, place, and official's family name in vermilion ink, this box on a pole slung over the back, with wind chimes dangling from the front end of the pole, warning the crowds when the courier passed through, thus the name chirin chirin no machi-bikyaku."

== Appearances in culture ==
1711. The Courier for Hell 冥途の飛脚 (Meido no hikyaku) is a love-suicide play by the Japanese writer Chikamatsu Monzaemon.

1949. A motion picture titled Tengu hikyaku (Goblin Courier) was produced by Daiei Film, starring Daisuke Katō.

1999. An episode of the romantic comedy fantasy anime series Trouble Chocolate is titled Run, Hikyaku-kun (走れ、飛脚くん！ (Hashire, hikyaku-kun)), in which a small monster named Courier (Hikyaku) appears.

== Bibliography ==
- Moriya, Katsuhisa (1990). "Urban Networks and Information Networks". In Nakane, Chie; Ôishi, Shinzaburô (eds.). Tokugawa Japan: The Social and Economic Antecedents of Modern Japan. Translated by Ronald, Toby.
