= Gerstle =

Gerstle may refer to:

== People with the family name ==
- C. Andrew Gerstle (born 1951), American-born Japanologist, working in Britain
- Frank Gerstle (1915–1970), American actor
- Gary Gerstle (born 1954), American academic
- Harry Gerstle (1880–1929), American college football player

== Location ==
- Gerstle Cove State Marine Reserve, protected area in California, USA.
