= The Battles of Coxinga =

Bunraku play by Chikamatsu

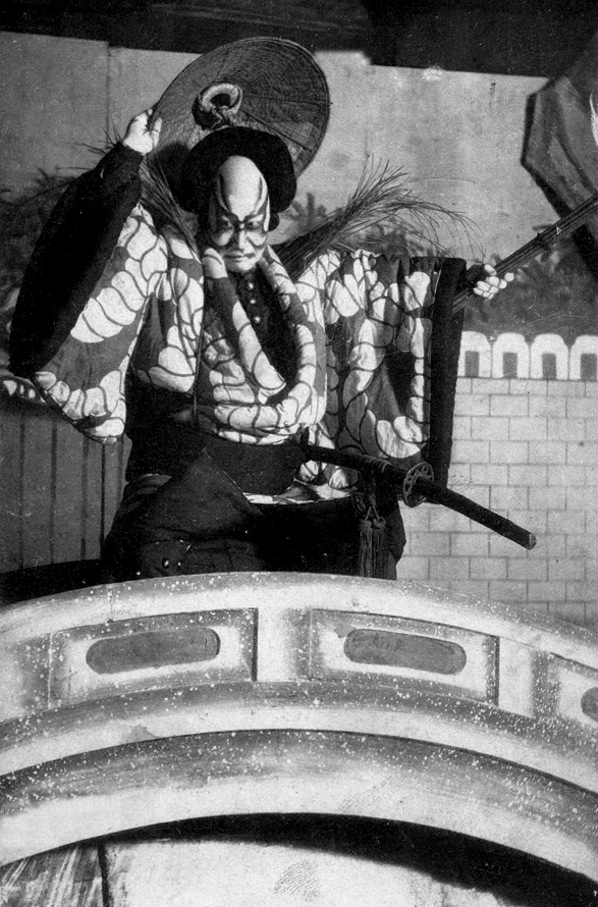
Watōnai in The Battles of Coxinga, Act III, Scene 2

The Battles of Coxinga (国姓爺合戦, Kokusen'ya Kassen; Japanese pronunciation: [ko.kɯ̥.seɰ̃.ja kaꜜs.seɴ]) is a puppet play by Chikamatsu Monzaemon. It was his most popular play. First staged on November 26, 1715, in Osaka, it ran for the next 17 months, far longer than the usual few weeks or months. Its enduring popularity can largely be attributed to its effectiveness as entertainment. Its many scenes over more than seven years follow the adventures of Coxinga (based on the adventures of the historical figure Koxinga; as the play is loosely based on history, it is a jidaimono play, not a domestic play) in restoring the rightful dynasty of China. It features effects uniquely suited for the puppet theater, such as the villain Ri Tōten gouging out an eye (ostensibly to prove his loyalty). Donald Keene suggests that the adventures in exotic China played well in isolationist Tokugawa Japan. While generally not considered as great in literary quality as some of Chikamatsu's domestic tragedies like The Love Suicides at Amijima, it is generally agreed to be his best historical play.

== Plot ==
=== Act 1 ===
==== Scene 1 ====
The plot begins in the exceedingly luxurious and profligate court of the Chinese Emperor Shisōretsu (思宋烈; actually Chongzhen Emperor of the Ming dynasty), in May 1644. His wife is ready to give birth to their first son and future heir; Ryūkakun (柳歌君), wife of the loyal and sagacious counselor Go Sankei (Wu Sangui), has just given birth so she can be the imperial heir's wet nurse.

The Great King of Tartary (the Manchus) sends Prince Bairoku (梅勒 王) as his emissary to the court. The emissary's demand is that the emperor's wife be sent to him, to become his consort. The minister and General of the Right, Ri Tōten (李蹈天) reveals that the reason that the Great King believes he can make this demand is because, in 1641, Ri Tōten had sought ten million bushels of grain to relieve the famine gripping the land. In exchange, Ri Tōten had given them his promise that later they could ask for anything they wished.

Go Sankei opposes making good on Ri Tōten's promise, pointing out to him the immorality and outright foolishness of sending away the Empress with the heir. The envoy is deeply offended and rises to leave, uttering promises of war, when Ri Tōten takes his dagger and gouges out his left eye and presents it to the prince, who is thereby mollified when he leaves.

==== Scene 2 ====
The Emperor, favorably impressed by Ri Tōten's sacrifice decides to marry his younger sister, the lovely Princess Sendan (栴檀皇女) to him. She is opposed to any marriage so the Emperor forces her to wager her assent on the outcome of a mock battle between 200 court ladies wielding plum or cherry branches. At the Emperor's previous instruction, the plums lose, dooming Sendan to the marriage.

Alarmed by the commotion of battle, Go Sankei apparels for war and rushes in. When he discovers the "senselessness" of the mock battle, he reproaches the emperor at length for alarming the palace; for setting a bad example; for his extravagances; his dislike of governance; and for being such a careless ruler that he didn't know that Ri Tōten was responsible for the famine by stealing rice from the Imperial storehouses and using his ill-got proceeds to bribe and corrupt people throughout the country; and last (but not least) for not recognizing that Ri Tōten gouging out his eye was a message to the Tartars that they had his complete backing and should invade. (Go Sankei "proves" this through use of yin and yang and analysis of ideographs.)

The Emperor scorns Go Sankei's lecture but immediately an ancient plaque with the dynasty name on it shatters. With a great tumult, the former envoy breaks into the palace at the head of an irresistible enemy host. Go Sankei's forces are hopelessly outnumbered and cannot resist. He instructs Ryūkakun to take the Princess to a certain harbor, named Kaidō (海登). Go Sankei and his men cut a path through the opposing hordes and secure the escape of the Empress and Emperor. Before Go Sankei's forces succeed and he returns, Ri Tōten and his brother, Ri Kaihō (李海方), seize the Emperor and cut off his head. Tōten takes the head to the Great King. Ri Kaihō is left to bring the Empress along into custody. On Go Sankei's return, he wrathfully strikes down Ri Kaihō and sorrowfully removes the imperial appurtenances and imperial regalia from the imperial corpse. With his own son and the Empress, the three escape to the coast at Kaidō.

==== Scene 3 ====
Unfortunately for the three fugitives, no ships can be found at Kaidō to take them across to safety. They are pursued by musketeers who kill the Empress. Pausing in his haste, Go Sankei realizes that the rightful heir to the throne may yet be salvaged. With his sword, he performs a Caesarean section and removes the still living prince. However, fearing that the enemy forces would realize that the prince lived when they saw the empty womb, Go Sankei kills his infant son and places the corpse in the womb to gain time and fool the enemy.

Go Sankei does not meet up with Ryūkakun and the princess. Ryūkakun ambushes one of Ri Toten's henchmen, seizing his boat and sword. She puts the princess in the boat, pushes it off, trusting in the elements to deliver the princess to an old loyal courtier exiled to Japan, "Ikkan" or "Tei Shiryū Rōikkan" (鄭芝龍老一官; Zheng Zhilong, also known as Iquan).

Ryūkakun remains on the shore and perishes fighting the Tartars; they leave satisfied that everyone (including the prince) is dead, except for Go Sankei — although he does not worry them.

=== Act 2 ===
==== Scene 1 ====
Act 2 dawns in a sleepy Japanese fishing village, to which the "Grand Tutor" Tei Shiryū fled after being banished from China so many years ago. There he remarried and had a son, Watōnai (和藤内), whom he raised as a fisherman and who has married a sturdy fisherwoman. He ceaselessly studied all the texts his father brought with him from China, studying with especial ardour the works on military strategy and tactics, and histories of war. Despite his earnest efforts, he never truly grasps military matters until one day walking on the beach he espies a clam and a shrike locked in combat. The shrike's beak has been trapped and it cannot escape; at the same time the clam is vulnerable as it is only safe so long as it holds on. The lesson Watōnai draws from this is "to provoke a quarrel between two adversaries, and then catch both when they least expect it." Watōnai immediately decides to try to apply his newfound insight to the war between China and Tartary.

No sooner has Watōnai's wife Komutsu (小むつ) pried apart the shrike and clam than the two see a small boat drifting towards them. Inside is the Princess Sendan. Neither Watōnai nor Komutsu speak Chinese. Perplexed what to do, they summon Tei Shiryū, who relates to Sendan his exile. Sendan then pours forth her recent history.

Encouraged by a prophecy of victory mentioned by Tei Shiryū's unnamed Japanese wife and by analysis of ideograms and the I Ching, Watōnai resolves to reconquer China for the emperor. Watōnai tries to leave without his Komutsu but, shamed by this, she tries to persuade Watōnai to beat her to death first with his oar. Watōnai refuses. He relents when she is about to hurl herself off the cliff; apparently he had only been testing her to see whether he could entrust the princess to her. She passes, and Watōnai, Tei Shiryū, and his wife set off for China.

==== Scene 2 ====
In China, Tei Shiryū has a plan of sorts. In his exile, he left behind one daughter named Kinshōjo (錦祥女), who has married a puissant lord and general named Gojōgun Kanki (甘輝). With her aid, hopefully Kanki could be persuaded to rebel and join forces with them and Go Sankei against their foreign overlords.

They decide to split up and take separate routes to avoid suspicion. While passing through the "Bamboo Forest of a Thousand Leagues" (千里ケ竹), Watōnai and his mother encounter a large and fierce tiger driven there by a tiger hunt. Watōnai defeats the tiger and receives its submission. An Taijin (安大人), underling of Ri Toten, rushes up with his officers and soldiers – they had driven the tiger thence, intending to take its head as a present for the Great King.

Watōnai refuses to give over the tiger and speaks rudely to them. They attack, but the tiger intervenes, splintering and shattering all their weaponry. Watōnai seizes An Taijin and hurls him against a rock. His body is shattered and he dies. Threatened, the officers and soldiers avow that they were not particularly enthused by Tartary and its regime, and so would join Watōnai. He gives them all Japanese-style shaved heads and new names like "Luzonbei" or "Siamtarō" or "Jakartabei" or even "Englandbei".

=== Act 3 ===
==== Scene 1 ====
At the impregnable Castle of Lions (獅子城), Watōnai is in favor of attacking at once with his newfound soldiers, arguing that his half-sister's failure to ever send a letter to Tei Shiryū amply proves her disloyalty. His mother dissuades him, pointing out that a wife must obey her husband.

Tei Shiryū asks at the gate to be allowed entrance and a private audience with General Kanki. Kanki is not there at that moment, so Tei Shiryū asks to speak to Kanki's wife and mentions that he is recently arrived from Japan. Agitated by his request and foreignness, the guards begin threatening them and preparing for battle; the narrator suggests that Kinshōjo rushes to the gate because she hears the rising tumult the guards make. She instructs the guards to "do nothing rash!" She then inquires into the identities of the visitors. Tei Shiryū reveals himself.

Kinshōjo allows that Tei Shiryū's story of himself is accurate, but she demands proof. He replies that his face should be compared to a portrait he had made of himself and left with her many years ago. This proof conclusively settles the matter, as the image matches and none by Kinshōjo and Tei Shiryū would remember the portrait now as well.

Kinshōjo would let them all in, but the Great King of Tartary has issued orders that no foreigners be allowed into any fortresses. Kinshōjo asks the soldiers to make an exception for her stepmother. They agree only on the condition that she be fettered like a criminal (so if anyone should take them to task for breaking their orders, they would have an excuse).

Before she vanishes into the gate, an agreement is made with Tei Shiryū and Watōnai waiting outside: If the negotiations go well, white dye will be dumped into the cistern, which will shortly flow into the river outside and be very visible. If the negotiations fail, the dye will be red.

==== Scene 2 ====
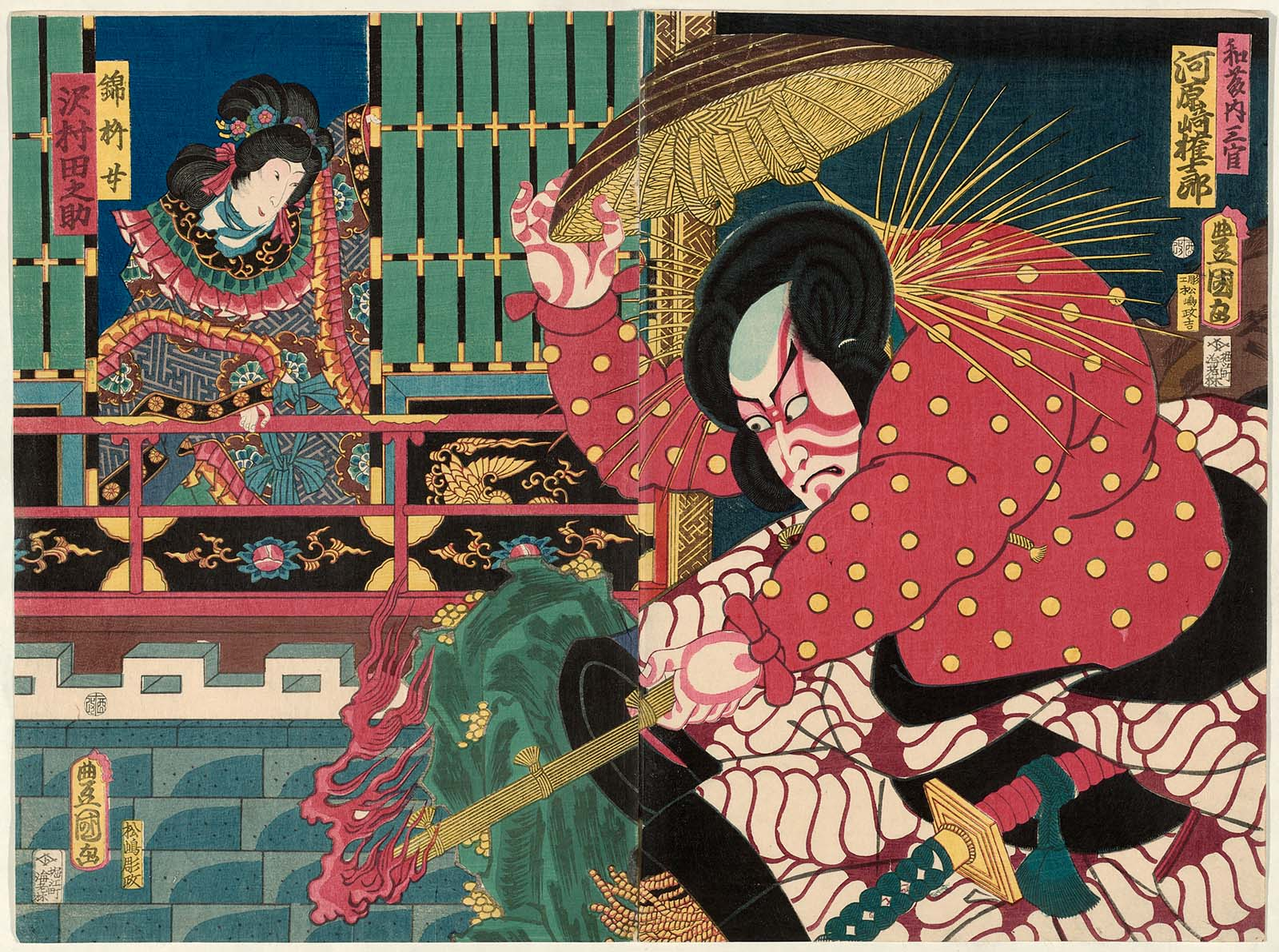
Kawarazaki Gonjūrō I as Watōnai (right) and Sawamura Tanosuke III as Kinshōjo (left)

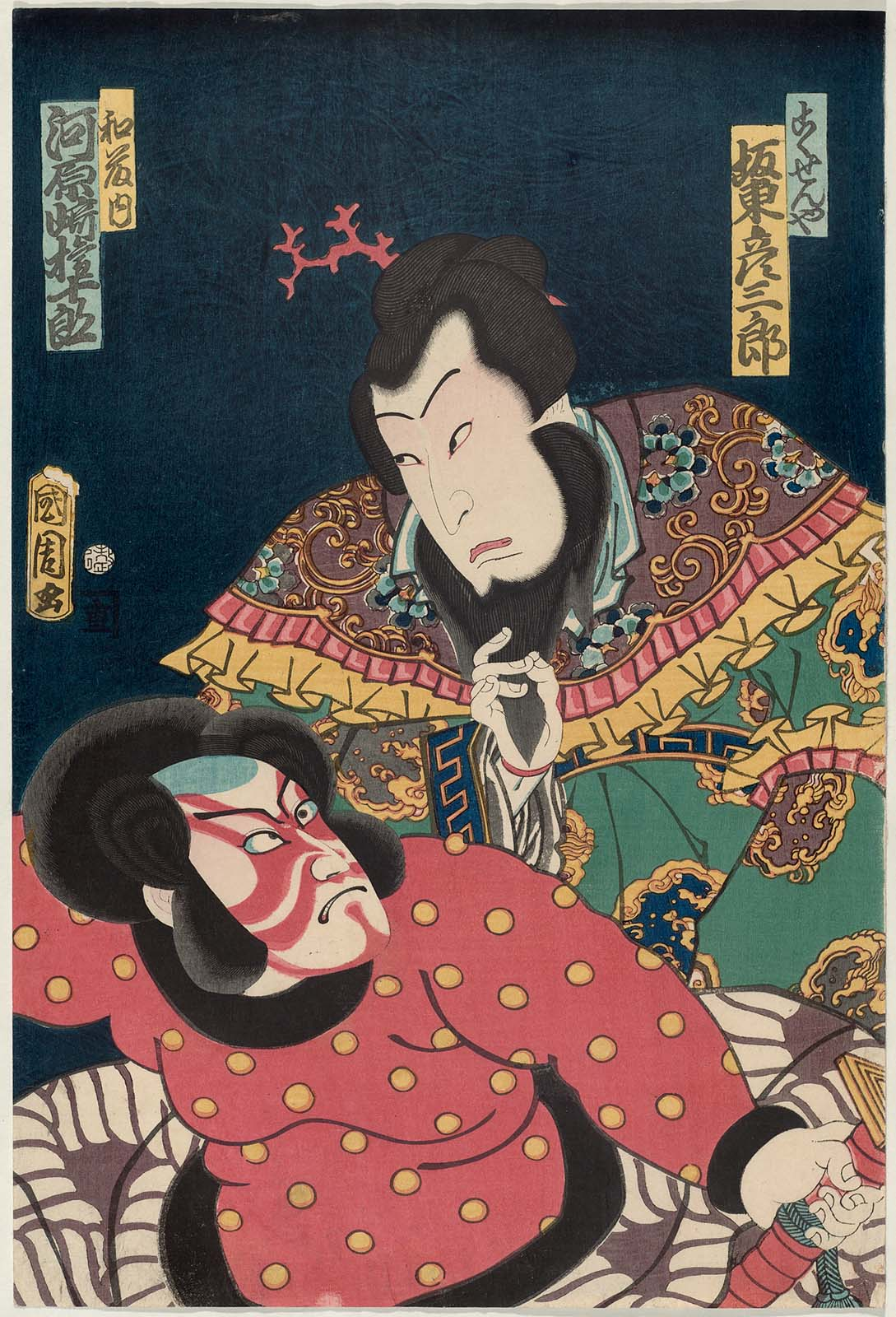
Bandō Hikosaburō V as Kanki (right) and Kawarazaki Gonjūrō I as Watōnai (left)

While Kinshōjo's maids are occupied trying to find some acceptable fare for the mother to eat, Kanki returns with good news: He has been promoted by the Great King to general of cavalry, commanding 100,000 horsemen. The mother comes in, and Kanki is moved by her hindrances and the love of her stepdaughter that prompted her to travel over the dangerous oceans. She asks him to throw in his lot with Watōnai.

His response is favorable, but he demurs from giving an immediate answer: He wants some time to consider. The mother presses him for the answer. Forced, he says yes, and then attempts to kill Kinshōjo. The mother intervenes and berates Kanki for trying to kill her daughter. Kanki explains that if he didn't kill Kinshōjo before announcing the alliance, he would be shamed before the whole world by gossip claiming that he did not join Watōnai's rebellion out of principle but because he was wholly dominated by his wife and her relations. Kinshōjo accepts Kanki's reasoning and steps forth to his sword. Once again, though cruelly bound, the mother intervenes. She reasons that if she allows her stepdaughter to be killed in front of her the very first time the two met, then "people will say that your Japanese stepmother hated her Chinese stepdaughter so much – though they were separated by three thousand leagues – that she had her put to death before her eyes. Such a report would disgrace not only me but Japan, for people would say, judging the country by my acts, that the Japanese were cruel-hearted."

Kinshōjo is convinced by the mother's speech this time and is reduced to tears. Seeing this, Kanki realizes that he cannot join Watōnai and is now his reluctant enemy. Kinshōjo goes to her bedchamber to deliver the scarlet dye signal. Watōnai bursts in among them regardless of the guards, and comes to loggerheads with Kanki when Kinshōjo comes back in: the scarlet came from no dye but the blood of her fatally cut open belly. Both Kanki and Watōnai are stunned, but now that Kinshōjo is dying and soon to be dead, Kanki can again join forces with Watōnai. Kanki bestows on Watōnai the new name that he will make famous: Coxinga.

Coxinga's mother perceives all this with joy, and true to her earlier words about shame, stabs herself in the throat and cuts through her liver. With her dying words, she exhorts Coxinga to defeat the hordes of Tartary mercilessly and to filially obey Tei Shiryū. She and Kinshōjo expire together.

Coxinga sets out with a will and an army.

=== Act 4 ===
==== Scene 1 ====
Back in Japan, Komutsu learns of Coxinga's success in obtaining Kanki as an ally. Joyously, she goes to the Shrine of Sumiyoshi, god of the sea, in Matsura. She prays and begins practicing her swordsmanship with a bokken. Some of her prayers are granted: Her skills have progressed to the point where she can cut off a tree branch at a stroke. Encouraged, she proposes to Princess Sendan that they take passage in a merchantman bound for China. The Princess agrees.

==== Scene 2 ====
Sendan and Komutsu, at the harbor, ask a young fisher boy wearing an uncannily antique hairstyle to take them part of the way in his fishing boat. He promptly complies and, while speaking to them of geography and islands, poles them all the way to China using his supernatural powers. In a twinkling they are there and the boy explains to them that he is really the "Boy of the Sea from Sumiyoshi".

==== Scene 3 ====
In this scene, focus shifts to Go Sankei, unseen for so long. For the past two years he had wandered the wilderness and remote regions of China as a fugitive, avoiding the agents of Ri Toten and raising the infant prince; he has grown inured to hardship and is weary. We see him climbing the "Mountain of the Nine Immortals" (九仙山), to its summit, prince in arms.

Pausing, he sees "two old men with shaggy eyebrows and white hair, seemingly in perfect harmony with the pine breeze, as friends who have lived together for years." The two are deeply engrossed in a game of Go. Go Sankei asks the two how they could be so deeply engrossed without the comforts of music, poetry, and wine? They reply that to Go Sankei the game is but a game, however they could see it for what it was: the world itself, yin and yang opposed, with the 361 sections roughly corresponding (to the 360 days of the lunar calendar) to a single day, and the tactics and strategies of the game the same as for war. Through the game, Go Sankei stands spellbound, watching as Coxinga wages his war. Thrilled at Coxinga's successes, Go Sankei makes as if to go to him. The two old men reveal that what he saw so vividly and as so close as the board itself were really hundreds of leagues away and that more than five years have passed since he began watching their game. The two reveal themselves as the founder of the Ming dynasty and his chief counselor, Liu Bowen.

The two vanish and Go Sankei discovers that he has grown a long beard and that the prince is now a seven-year-old of grave voice and mien. He asks leave of the prince to inform Coxinga of the prince's location. But the prince has no chance to reply because Tei Shiryū happens on them with the Princess Sendan in tow. They exchange news and discover that the villainous former envoy, Prince Bairoku and his thousands of men are swarming up the mountainside after them.

They beseech the first Emperor of the Ming and Liu Bowen to aid them. In response, a bridge of clouds to the other side of the valley forms; they escape on it. When Prince Bairoku and his men try to follow, the bridge is blown away by a wind, and he and his men fall to their deaths. The survivors are pelted with rocks and other missiles until they succumb and Prince Bairoku, having managed to climb out of the chasm, has his head bashed in by Go Sankei with the two immortals' go board.

The group then goes to the Castle of Foochow, controlled by Coxinga.

=== Act 5 ===
==== Scene 1 ====
Coxinga's forces are drawn up and arrayed before Nanjing – the final battle is near. Coxinga discusses with his war council of Kanki, Go Sankei and Tei Shiryū how to defeat the Great King, Ri Toten, and their forces.

Go Sankei advocates an ingenious stratagem: tubes stuffed with honey and hornets should be prepared, and when Coxinga's forces prepared to retreat, dropped for the Tartar hordes to greedily open; whereupon they would be stung unmercifully and disarrayed. This opening would then become the focus of their true assault. Should they catch on and attempt to burn the tubes en masse, the gunpowder placed in the bottom of the tubes against just such an occasion would explode them to bits.

Kanki proposes that several thousands of baskets of choice provisions be thoroughly poisoned and left behind in another feigned retreat, whereupon they would counterattack.

Coxinga likes both suggestions but decides to simply engage in a straightforward frontal assault, with Komutsu and her Japanese-looking troops in the vanguard.

The Princess Sendan rushes in with a message from Tei Shiryū: He has decided on an honorable suicide by attacking Nanking alone. Coxinga orders the assault launched immediately.

==== Scene 2 ====
Tei Shiryū arrives at Nanking's main gate and issues his challenge to Ri Toten. The first soldier to respond is easily killed by him. Seeing that Tei Shiryū, Coxinga's father, is come, the Great King orders his capture. Tei Shiryū is surrounded by more than 50 club wielding men and is beaten, captured, bound.

Shortly thereafter, Coxinga's assault begins. Unarmed, he defeats all comers until Ri Toten and the Great King of Tartary ride up; bound to the face of Ri Toten's shield is Tei Shiryū. Coxinga cannot bring himself to attack now that Tei Shiryū is a hostage.

Into this dilemma rush Go Sankei and Kanki. They prostrate themselves, and get close to the Great King, pretending to try to exchange Coxinga's head for their lives. The King is pleased by their offer but not so pleased when they spring up and seize him. Even as they do so, Coxinga pulls Tei Shiryū off the shield and binds Ri Toten to it.

The King is let off with only 500 lashes, but Ri Toten has his head and both arms cut off by Coxinga, Go Sankei, and Kanki, respectively.

The Emperor Eiryaku (Yongli Emperor) is placed on the throne, and all ends well.

== See also ==
Media related to The Battles of Coxinga at Wikimedia Commons

- Fall of the Ming dynasty
