= Za Kabuki =

Kabuki troupe in Australia

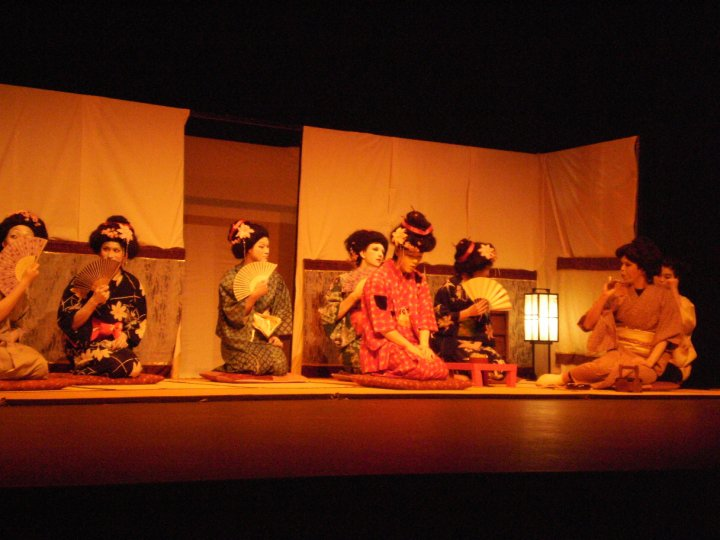
The second act of Za Kabuki's 2010 performance of Enokido Kenji's play Topknot Bunshichi

Za Kabuki (Japanese: ザ歌舞伎), founded in 1976 at the Australian National University, is the longest running Kabuki troupe outside Japan. Directed by Shun Ikeda of the ANU Japan Centre, with a cast and crew consisting mainly of ANU Japanese students, the troupe performs traditional Kabuki plays almost entirely in classical Japanese, with some English translation and ad-libs inserted to assist the mainly English-speaking audiences.

== History ==
The tradition of annual Japanese performances at the ANU began in 1976, with the first shows taking place in the walkway between the Sports & Recreation building and the Union building. During the 1980s and 1990s, productions became increasingly elaborate, with authentic makeup and costumes, original sets and musical accompaniment, hosted at a number of the theatre facilities around the ANU campus.

In 1999, Producer Suzy Styles led the Za Kabuki troupe on their first tour of Japan, with performances in Nara and Kobe. On 11 September 2001, a troupe from Kobe's Konan University returned the favour by performing at the ANU's Llewellyn Hall.

The 2006 production of Yukio Mishima's Iwashiuri Koi no Hikiami, for the first time in Za Kabuki history, featured a 7-piece orchestra, also made up predominantly of ANU Japan Centre students. The orchestra played an original score, composed specifically for the play by Thomas Spencer Hartley.

2013 marked Za Kabuki's first performance in the absence of long-time director, Shun Ikeda. Instead the role of director was taken on by third-year ANU student and former kuroko, Noriyuki Yabe. Despite the timing of the performance coinciding with exam period, the 2013 performance of Kagotsurube managed to sell over four hundred tickets in a twenty-four-hour period and was greatly praised by critics.

In 2016, the crew once again travelled to Japan, performing three shows in the Tohoku region, particularly in areas affected by the 2011 Earthquake and Tsunami. The tour was highly successful and deepened ties between the club and communities in Akita, Kesennuma and Ishinomaki.

In 2017, the group conducted a performance tour in Melbourne, performing 'Topknot Bunshichi' at two venues. The shows were received well and preceded two sell-out nights in Canberra in early October.

In 2019, the group visited Cowra and performed at the Festival of International Understanding where Japan was the guest nation. The show was very well received by a large audience of school children and locals.

In 2020, the group decided to go online with their performance due to COVID-19.

== Past performances ==
Year	Title	English title	Author	Producer	Director
2025	Hikosan Gongen Chikai no Sukedachi	Keyamura	Umeno Shitakaze, Chikamatsu Yasuzō	Marion Halas, Ruiqi Wang	Shun Ikeda
2024	Shibaraku	Shibaraku	Ichikawa Danjūrō IX	Chris Ngyuen, Marion Halas	Shun Ikeda
2023	Ranpei Monogurui	The Madness of Ranpei	Asada Icchō	Cerise Yumul, Chris Ngyuen	Shun Ikeda
2022	Kirare Yosa	Scarface Yosaburo	Segawa Jōkō III	Blake Thompson, Cerise Yumul	Shun Ikeda
2021	Natsu Matsuri Naniwa Kagami	The Summer Festival: Mirror of Osaka	Namiki Sōsuke	Kai Yoshida Dewar, Blake Thompson	Shun Ikeda
2020	Kenuki	The Whisker Tweezers	Nakata Mansuke	Neha Jagannath, Kai Yoshida Dewar	Shun Ikeda
2019	Jiisan Baasan	Old Timers	Original Story by Mori Ôgai. Play by Uno Nobuo	Peter Gravestock, Waka Okumura	Shun Ikeda
2018	Mabuta no Haha	The Remembered Mother	Hasegawa Shin	Waka Okumura, Akira Nakayama	Shun Ikeda
2017	Ninjou Banashi Bunshichi Mottoi	Topknot Bunshichi	Enokido Kenji	Erin McCullagh, Marika Kirton	Shun Ikeda
2016	Iwashi Uri Koi Hikiami	The Sardine Seller's Net of Love	Yukio Mishima	Erin McCullagh, Alexander Joske	Shun Ikeda
2015	Kumo ni Magou Ueno no Hatsuhana	Kochiyama The Extortionist	Kawatake Shinshichi II	Esther Soh, Tierney Boel	Shun Ikeda
2014	Sukeroku	Sukeroku	Tsuuchi Jihei II, Tsuuchi Han'emon (adapted by Joshua Pako)	Naomi Holm, Cianne So Yun Jeong	Shun Ikeda
2013	Kagotsurube Sato No Eizame	Kagotsurube The Haunted Sword	Kawatake Shinshichi III	Jia Eon Cheng, Katherine Zhou	Nori Yabe
2012	Kenuki	The Whisker Tweezers	Nakata Mansuke	Masaya Kimura	Shun Ikeda
2011	Iwashi Uri Koi Hikiami	The Sardine Seller's Net of Love	Yukio Mishima	Dia Jalil	Shun Ikeda
2010	Bunshichi Motoyui Ninjyou Banashi	Topnot Bunshichi: A Story of Human Relations	Enokido Kenji	Kaima Negishi, Haru Depp	Shun Ikeda
2009	Ise Ondo Koi no Netaba	Dancing with a Sleeping Blade	Chikamatsu Tokuzo	Rachael McAndrew	Shun Ikeda
2008	Hakata Kojoro Namimakura	Love At Sea	Chikamatsu Monzaemon	Michiko Takimoto	Masafumi Matsumoto
2007	Kanadehon Chushingura	The Treasury of Loyal Retainers	Takeda Izumo	Elli Kim	Shun Ikeda
2006	Iwashiuri Koi no Hikiami	Sardine Seller Casts The Net of Love	Yukio Mishima	Irene Abarquez	Shun Ikeda
2005	Shinju Ten no Amijima	The Love Suicides at Amijima	Chikamatsu Monzaemon	Will Mitchell / Peri Jenkins	Shun Ikeda
2004	Koi no Tayori Yamato Oorai	The Courier for Hell	Chikamatsu Monzaemon	?	Shun Ikeda
2003	Ninjo Banashi Bunshichi Motoyui	Topknot Bunshichi: A Tale of Human Relations	Enokido Kenji	Stephen Harrington	Shun Ikeda
2002	Iwashiuri Koi no Hikiami	Catching a Fish Called Love	Yukio Mishima	Catherine Bailey	Shun Ikeda
2001	Kanadehon Chūshingura (7-dan-me)	The Legend of the 47 Ronin (Act 7)	Takeda Izumo	?	Shun Ikeda

== See also ==
- Kabuki
- Rakugo
