= Mayako =

- Gender: Female

Origin
- Origin: Japanese
- Meaning: Different meanings depending on the kanji used

Mayako (written: 摩耶子 or 真耶子) is a feminine Japanese given name. Notable people with the name include:

- Mayako Kubo (久保 摩耶子; born 1947), Japanese pianist and composer
- Mayako Nigo (仁後 真耶子; born 1979), Japanese voice actress
