= The Uprooted Pine =

Bunraku play by Chikamatsu

The Uprooted Pine (Nebiki no Kadomatsu) is a play by Chikamatsu. It is a sewamono play (based on a real incident) like The Love Suicides at Sonezaki, written for the puppet theater. It was first performed on 1 February 1718.

The title contains several meanings related to the plot: "uprooting" could be an expression referring to buying out a courtesan's contract from her owner and possessing her exclusively (uprooting her from her former life and residence), and "pine" could denote the highest class of courtesan (as opposed to "plum tree" for several ranks down); the title could also reference New Years festivities, as 1 February was one day after the Japanese New Year in 1718.

== Plot ==
=== Act 1 ===
The plot begins on the Japanese New Year's Day in 1718, before the coming Day of the Rat on which the custom used to be to go out into the fields and uproot a pine tree as a part of the festivities. A great and renowned courtesan named Azuma is accosted by a poor old woman, who pours out her trouble: her son has been reduced by circumstances to working as a day laborer. Once his employer ordered him to deliver a letter to Azuma; this he did, but he fell madly in love with her. The old woman attempted to dissuade him, pointing out how impossible it would be for him to afford any of Azuma's services, but he refused to give up his hope. Finally she made him a deal: if she could persuade Azuma to drink a friendly cup of sake with young Hard Luck Yohei (as the son is nicknamed), then Yohei would abandon his hopeless love.

Azuma is deeply moved by the woman's words, and agrees; but calling out to Yohei, she lays out her troubles: Azuma is deeply in love with the wealthy and handsome merchant Yojibei of Yamazaki, son of Jōkan, but Yojibei cannot buy out Azuma's contract because his wife Okiku is jealous.

Azuma then attempts to give Yohei ten gold pieces so he could go out into the pleasure quarter and find some girl who was available to be intimate with.

Yohei hurls the gold to the ground, shamed that Azuma should have offered it. Azuma admits her mistake, and instead gives Yohei an under-robe Yojibei had previously given Azuma. Realizing the depths of her love, Yohei instead takes the money, vowing to go to Edo and prosper in the oil trade there; after he makes his fortune, he will return and ransom Azuma so she could be reunited with Yojibei. The two agree to go to a teahouse to drink together before Yohei leaves.

In scene two, Azuma is accosted by the boorish and ill-mannered Hikosuke, a wealthy tobacco merchant who has repeatedly sought Azuma's services and has as often been turned down. Refused a fifth time, he attempts to drag Azuma to a back-room, there to have his way by main force. He is soundly beaten by Yohei and tossed out of the teahouse. Hikosuke's bluster comes to an end and he departs hastily.

No sooner is he gone then it is bruited about that Yojibei has arrived. He learns of the recent events from Azuma and thanks Yohei, proposing that before he leaves for Edo, he spend the night with Azuma and Yojibei drinking and dancing and singing as their thanks to him. Yohei begs off, as his legs hurt from the unfamiliar seating arrangements and his mother is no doubt worrying about what has become of him.

On his way out, he encounters Hikosuke who is spoiling for a rematch. Yohei stabs Hikosuke in the head, and flees when Hikosuke yells for help – if he were to be captured, he would never make to Edo and so could never help Azuma. Confused as to the identity of his assailant, Hikosuke blames Yojibei, who is speedily apprehended. Yojibei realizes that it was Yohei who is to blame, but he remains silent: he owes Yohei a debt of honor for protecting Azuma, and he will remain silent even though he is in mortal danger of execution if Hikosuke perishes of his wound.

=== Act 2 ===
Act two opens with Okiku preparing food for Yojibei, who is now under house arrest in the house of his father, Jōkan. Jōkan is apparently refusing to pay off Hikosuke to drop the charges, even though he is extremely wealthy and could easily afford it. Jōkan and Yojibei's samurai father-in-law, Jibuemon discuss the matter through the medium of a game of shogi, but Jōkan is resolutely against saving Yojibei. Weeping, Okiku and Jibuemon go out into the garden. Just then, Azuma arrives and throws a letter over for Yojibei; it instructs Yojibei to kill himself before a commoner executioner could, assuring him that Azuma would kill herself the moment she heard.

Outraged, Okiku goes out to Azuma and reproaches her:

"Thanks to you my husband has neglected the family business and has shown himself completely indifferent to what happens at home. Day and night he spends in visits to the Quarter...Cursed strumpet! Shameless creature!"

Azuma accepts her accusations and to show the sincerity of her grief, is on the verge of cutting her throat with a razor when Okiku is convinced and urges her to forbear.

Jōkan comes out. He speaks to Okiku of mice and mice traps; Okiku understands that what he is really talking about is his desire to see Yojibei escape his household and the headsman. Yojibei initially refuses the proffered escape with Azuma: if Hikosuke were to die, then Jōkan would be executed in Yojibei's stead, and even if he weren't, Yojibei's escape would cause all of Jōkan's assets to be impounded. Jōkan threatens to kill himself then and there. Yojibei reluctantly complies. Left behind, Okiku watches tearfully as Yojibei and Azuma leave for Edo.

=== Act 3 ===
In act 3, Azuma and Yojibei travel from Yamazaki to Nara. Yojibei is not well – has gone mad. The lyrical scene ends with a beautiful description of the scenery and circumstances.

Time passes before scene two takes place in late summer. Yohei rides up to the same teahouse he had so fatefully drank in with Azuma and Yojibei. He recounts his enormous success in Edo to the master of the house, and announces that he will ransom the fugitive Azuma.

However, Yohei is not the only would-be buyer. Hikosuke has recovered his former spirits and wishes to buy out Azuma's contract as well, as does an old samurai with an extremely valuable antique two-foot broadsword; Yohei is convinced that this old man is Jibuemon.

The owner determines that he can't let Azuma be ransomed before she returns. It would set a bad precedent otherwise. Yohei has his two chests brought in, and out spring both Azuma and Yojibei, now restored to his sense. Hikosuke is allowed to leave alive by Jibuemon, as long as he reports to the police that it was Yohei who did it and drops the charges. Yohei ransoms Azuma's contract for only 300 gold pieces, as it has not long to run, and gives the other 700 to various people. Azuma and Yojibei marry, to live happily ever after, although nothing is said of Okiku. Everyone begins to party.
