= The Japanese Letter-Writing Era =

The Japanese Letter-Writing Era was a key point in the later parts of Tokugawa Japan. It included writing letters that described personal emotions. These were usually written in vivid detail.

== Descriptions ==
Within the letters of this period, descriptions of feelings and emotions were key. Emotions presented included: loneliness, sadness, disappointment, astonishment, joy and much more. Sometimes letters written in the period expressed thoughts on current social events. This provided much information towards many during the time.

== What Brought the Letter-Writing Period ==
From about the middle of the Tokugawa period, more of the commoner's children were being taught to read and write. Japan started to change from this point of time, and fewer people were becoming illiterate. This brought higher chances of people writing things such as letters.

More people were starting to travel far away from home. These were to carry out certain duties. Because of this letters became a more key source of communication.

Another thing that brought the letter-writing period, was the establishment of the Hikyaku Postal Service. This service first opened in the Kantō area in 1729 and grew more as time neared the end of the 18th century. This growth was most likely what caused an increase in letters as a form of communication.

== Key Letter-Writers ==
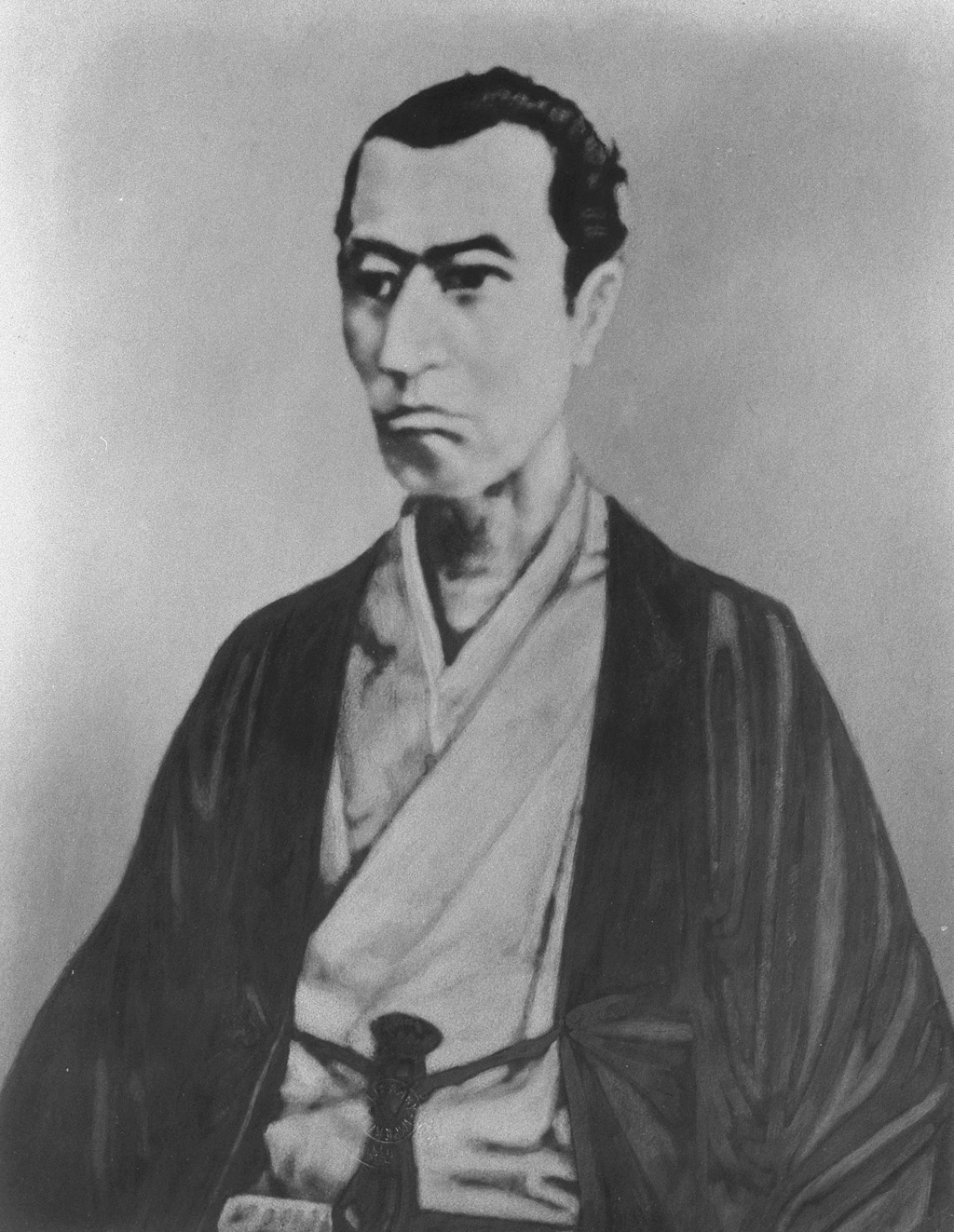
Yoshida Shoin was a key letter-writer during the letter-writing period in Japan

Key letter-writers during this period include people such as Yoshida Shoin. He had a collection of 245 letters. Some were very long and this interest began when he was about 21 in 1850. He got this interest from when he travelled beyond the boundary of his feudal domain to Kyushu. Kyushu was renowned in Japan for being a great place of Chinese and Western studies. Yoshida Shoin was put to execution on October 27, 1859, so he wrote farewell letters to family and friends of his.

Yoshida Shoin's contributions to the letter-writing era were what brought the era to its peak.
