= Ryūsaku Tsunoda =

- 角田 柳作
- Ryūsaku Tsunoda in his Columbia University classroom
- Born: September 8, 1877; Gunma prefecture, Japan
- Died: November 29, 1964 (aged 87); Honolulu, Hawaii, United States
- Occupation: Japanese studies

Ryūsaku Tsunoda (角田 柳作, Tsunoda Ryūsaku; 8 September 1877 - 29 November 1964) was a Japanese scholar and is known as the "father of Japanese studies" at Columbia University. He was directly responsible for developing the Japanese language and literature collection at Columbia's library. Prominent among the former-students who credit his influence as formative is Donald Keene, who had himself become a later Dean of Japanese studies in the United States.

== Biography ==
Tsunoda was the youngest of seven children born to a family of peasants in Japan. He studied at Waseda University, and later developed interest in the United States.

Keene's own perspective on Tsunoda was expressed in a lecture given at Waseda University in 1994:

"His vocation was teaching, not writing. His joy as a teacher lay in communicating knowledge directly and enthusiastically to his students. ... As one of his students, I feel it regrettable that Prof. Tsunoda is not known just because he did not publish anything."

== Selected works ==
In an overview of writings by and about Tsunoda, OCLC/WorldCat lists roughly 50 works in 100+2 publications in 4 languages and 2,000+ library holdings.

This list is not finished; you can help Wikipedia by adding to it.

- Japan in the Chinese Dynastic Histories, 1951 (with L. Carrington Goodrich)
- Sources of Japanese Tradition, Vols. I-II, 1958 (with William Theodore de Bary and Donald Keene)
