= Iwashi Uri Koi no Hikiami =

Iwashi Uri Koi No Hikiami (鰯売恋曳網 The Sardine Seller's Net of Love) is a 1954 comedic Kabuki play by Yukio Mishima (三島 由紀夫). It was first performed in November 1954 at the Kabukiza theatre in Tokyo, and was praised for its "refreshing originality".

== Plot ==
The sardine-seller, Sarugenji (猿源氏) has fallen in love with an upper-class courtesan known as "Hotarubi". However, due to his lowly social position it seems as if he has no hope of ever encountering her. Due to a fortunate meeting of chance with his father, Ebina Namidabutsu, and his horse-seller friend, Bakurourokurouzaemon, Sarugenji is able to devise a plan to pose as the samurai "Utsunomiya" in order to enter the pleasure quarter and woo Hotarubi. The trio then encounter difficulty getting Sarugenji to mount Bakurourokurouzaemon's three-legged horse.

Meanwhile, the courtesans of the pleasure house, including Hotarubi, are occupied playing a game involving matching poetry on shells, as they notice a strange-looking gardener. They are interrupted by the arrival of Ebina from the Hanamichi. He informs the owner of the premises, Teishu, of the impending arrival of "Lord Utsunomiya". Upon Sarugenji's arrival in his samurai guise, he encounters difficulty from the courtesans, each teasing him by pretending to be Hotarubi. After the entrance of the true Hotarubi, the courtesans demand a story of bravery from "Lord Utsunomiya". Sarugenji tells them a story dominated by fish puns and then passes out upon Hotarubi's lap from too much sake as the rest of the courtesans leave the stage.

Sarugenji proceeds to sleep-talk about sardines. Upon his waking, he is questioned by Hotarubi, and claims his sardine seller's cry is actually a poem. Hotarubi then confesses that she is truly a princess who ran away from home to chase the cry of a sardine seller that she had fallen in love with. Just as she is about to attempt suicide, Sarugenji (with the aid of Ebina and Bakurourokurouzaemon) manages to convince her that he is actually the sardine seller she has been looking for. Just as Sarugenji declares that he will marry her, Teishu reminds them that he is owed 200 ryō as Hotarubi's ransom.

Suddenly, the strange gardener from earlier arrives on stage, holding captive Sarugenji's "retainers". It seems that he is actually Jirota, a samurai in the service of Hotarubi's parents, come to pay her ransom. Hotarubi orders that he give 200 Ryō to Teishu for her ransom, fifty ryō to Bakurourokurouzaemon for the horse, and that he delivers a message to her parents. Failing in his duty to rescue her, Jirota attempts seppuku, but his sword is seemingly too rusty for it to work. The play ends happily as Sarugenji and Hotarubi exit via the Hanamichi to get married.

== Performances ==
The National Theatre of Japan in Hayabusa performed Iwashiuri as part of a double bill in September 2010.

The Australian National University's Za Kabuki performed the play in 2002, 2006, and 2011. The 2006 performance was accompanied by an original orchestral score.

Ginza's Kabuki-za performed it in October 2014.
