= The Pleasures of Japanese Literature =

1988 nonfiction book by Donald Keene

- The book's cover; a work from the "Album of the Thirty-Six Immortal Poets" by Sumiyoshi Gukei (1631–1705)
- Author: Donald Keene
- Cover artist: Sumiyoshi Gukei; design by Jennifer Dossin
- Language: English
- Series: Companions to Asian studies
- Subject: Japanese literature (poetry, theater, and fiction)
- Genre: Academic
- Publisher: Columbia University Press
- Publication date: 1988
- Publication place: United States

The Pleasures of Japanese Literature is a 1988 nonfiction book by Donald Keene that introduces key themes in Japanese literature and aesthetics. Aimed at students and general readers, it covers poetry, fiction, theater, and traditional concepts such as wabi and mono no aware. Unlike Keene's more academic works, this book is concise, informal, and designed to be accessible to a wider audience.

== Overview ==
The book is based on five lectures Keene gave between 1986 and 1987: three at the New York Public Library, one at the University of California, Los Angeles, and one at the Metropolitan Museum of Art in New York. He wrote both the lectures and the book for a general audience, intending to introduce Western readers to the literary qualities he finds most striking in Japanese tradition.

It includes five chapters, each focused on a different area:

1. Japanese aesthetics, covering ideas such as wabi and mono no aware
2. Japanese poetry, including classical waka, along with some renga and haiku
3. The uses of Japanese poetry in social and cultural settings
4. Japanese fiction, with discussions of works like Tsurezuregusa by Yoshida Kenkō and Biography of Eight Dogs
5. Japanese theater, including Noh, Kabuki, and Bunraku

== Critical reception ==
The Pleasures of Japanese Literature received positive reviews. D. E. Mills described it as "engagingly down-to-earth" and concluded, "I would not wish the book to be other than it is."

Kinya Tsuruta praised the book's production quality and tone, writing that it reflects "the seasoned, occasionally bemused voice of a scholar with an exceptional understanding of the culture he is both observing and living."

Another reviewer, K. Fiala, noted that the book "successfully attained" the difficult task of conveying the beauty of Japanese literary tradition.

This reception reflects the broader view of Keene as "the leading interpreter of that nation's literature to the Western world."

== Historical context ==
The Pleasures of Japanese Literature was published in 1988, during a period of increasing Western interest in Japanese culture and literature. One scholar observed that "Japan's culture had become thoroughly international by the end of the 1990s."

As a prominent scholar of Japanese literature, Donald Keene played a key role in fostering greater understanding of Japanese literary traditions among Western readers. The book has been cited as evidence that "the rich artistic and social traditions of Japan can indeed be understood by readers from [the West]."

Literature from this era often emphasized the reader's inner life, affirmed national identity, and drew from historical themes. Keene's book reflects these tendencies by highlighting traditional values and aesthetics. While some contemporary works also addressed modern life, gender roles, and technological change, Keene focused on enduring literary and cultural traditions.
