= The Love Suicides at Sonezaki (1981 film) =

1981 puppet film

The Love Suicides at Sonezaki (2011 DVD reissue)

The Love Suicides at Sonezaki (曽根崎心中, Sonezaki shinju) is a 1981 near life-size Bunraku puppet film based on Chikamatsu's sewamono The Love Suicides at Sonezaki. Director Midori Kurisaki (栗崎 碧, stage name as actress Satoko Minami) convinced Living National Treasure puppeteers Tamao Yoshida and Minosuke Yoshida to let her take their puppets outdoors for live action filming outside the traditional Bunraku theatre – the first time anyone had filmed such a performance in outdoor scenery.
