= Andrew Gerstle =

American Japanologist

Academic background
- Education: Columbia University (BA); Waseda University (MA); Harvard University (PhD）

Academic work
- Discipline: Japanese culture
- Institutions: Australian National University; SOAS University of London

C. Andrew Gerstle, FBA (born 18 June 1951) is an American-born Japanologist and academic, who has been Professor of Japanese Studies at the University of London's School of Oriental and African Studies since 1993.

== Career ==
Born on 18 June 1951 in the United States, C. Andrew Gerstle studied Japanese culture at Columbia University, graduating in 1973 with a Bachelor of Arts degree. He completed a Master of Arts degree at Waseda University six years later, and carried out his doctoral studies at Harvard University; in 1980, he was awarded a PhD for his thesis "Circles of fantasy: musical and dramatic conventions in the plays of Chikamatsu". He was appointed to a lectureship at the Australian National University in 1980, and was promoted to Professor of Japanese nine years later. Since 1993, he has been Professor of Japanese Studies at the School of Oriental and African Studies (SOAS). He was also director of the Arts and Humanities Research Council Centre for Asian and African Studies at SOAS from 2000 to 2005.

According to his British Academy profile, Gerstle's research focuses on "The cultural and social history of 17th–19th century Japan, with particular reference to Bunraku and Kabuki theatres, popular literature, sexuality and the visual arts". In 2013, he organised a project which resulted in the "Shunga: sex and pleasure in Japanese art" exhibition at the British Museum.

== Awards and honours ==
In 2015, Gerstle was elected a Fellow of the British Academy, the United Kingdom's national academy for the humanities and social sciences.

== Select publications ==
- Circles of Fantasy: Convention in the Plays of Chikamatsu, Harvard East Asian Monographs no. 116 (Council on East Asian Studies, Harvard University, 1986).
- Eighteenth-Century Japan: Culture and Society (Allen & Unwin, 1989).
- Theatre as Music: The Bunraku Play 'Mt Imo and Mt Se: An Exemplary Tale of Womanly Virtue' (Centre for Japanese Studies, University of Michigan, 1990).
- Recovering the Orient: Artists, Scholars, Appropriations (Harwood Academic Publishers, 1994).
- Chikamatsu: Five Late Plays (Columbia University Press, 2001).
- Kabuki Heroes on the Osaka Stage, 1780–1830 (British Museum Press, 2005).
- Shunga: Sex and Pleasure in Japanese Art (British Museum Press, 2013).
- Shunga: Ten Questions and Answers (International Research Center for Japanese Studies, 2013).
