= Mayako Kubo =

Japanese pianist and composer (born 1947)

- Born: 5 December 1947 (age 78); JapanHyogo prefecture, Kobe
- Resting place: Germany
- Other name: 久保 摩耶子
- Occupation: composer
- Website: Mayako Kubo

Mayako Kubo (born 5 December 1947) is a Japanese pianist and composer.

== Biography ==
Mayako Kubo was born in Kobe, Japan, and studied piano at Osaka College of Music. In 1972 she continued her studies in composition with Roman Haubenstock-Ramati and Erich Urbanner in Vienna, where she composed her first pieces of tape music at the Institute of Electroacoustics and Experimental Music. In the 1980s she studied with Helmut Lachenmann in Hannover and Stuttgart and then musicology with Carl Dahlhaus in Berlin.

In 1989 Kubo became interested in dramaturgy and theatrical performance, and in 1990 moved to Italy, but then returned to live and work in Berlin in 1994.

== Honors and awards ==
- 1978 – 1979 Federal Ministry for Education, Art and Culture: work *scholarship
- 1979 International Contest for Electronic and Experimental Music, *Bourges: award
- 1980 City of Vienna: work scholarship
- 1982 – 1983 Alban Berg Foundation: scholarship
- 1983 – 1984 Ministry of Science and Research of Lower Saxony: scholarship for artists (Schreyahn)
- 1989 Cultural Senate Berlin: work scholarship
- 1999 Japan Foundation: fellow
- 2000 – 2001 Bundesmusikakademie Rheinsberg: work scholarship
- 2002 Hanse Wissenschaftskolleg: fellow
- 2004 Berlin Senate: scholarship
- 2004 – 2007 Yaddo Foundation: scholarship
- 2006 Bogliasco Foundation: fellow

== Works ==
Selected works include:

- Rashomon, opera (1996; Japanese version 2002)
- Osan – Secret of Love, opera (2003/2004)
- Der Spinnfaden, opera (The Spinning Thread, 2010)
- Margeriten weiss in Flaschenbegleitung, scenic music (2004)
- Hyperion-Fragmente, music theatre (2001)
- 1. Symphony (1993/98)
- 2. Symphony (2000)
- Piano Concerto (1985/86)
- Sanriku-Lieder (2011)
- Mirlitonnades – 24 Lieder (2005)
- Solo für Kontrabass (2005)
- Berlinisches Tagebuch, piano cycle (1989/90)
- Yogi for mixed chorus a cappella (1980)

Her work has been recorded and issued on media, including:

- Wohin, Trio, Ensemble KU, Label: Kreuzberg Records, 2011
- AtemPause, Guitar quartett, Label: UNIMOZ, 2008
- Rashomon opera, Label: edition Ariadne, 1996
- Piano Recital: Ikeya-Fuchino – SOEGIJO, P.G. / GOURZI, K. / ERDMANN, D. / STAEMPFLI, E. / SIMON, A. / KUBO, M. (Berlinisches Tagebuch), Label: Thorofon, 1991

== Bibliography ==
- Uebersetzung – Transformation, hrsg. H. Yamamoto/C. Ivanovic. Koenigshausen & Neumann, Wuerzburg, 2010
- Komponisten der Gegenwart, Edition Text und Kritik, Muenchen, 2009 rev.
- Opera in Japan. Yearbook (Opera-Nenkan) 2005 and 2008, Japan Opera Association, Tokio 2006 and 2009
- Grove Dictionary of Music and Musicians, 2nd edition
