= The Love Suicides at Amijima =

1721 Japanese tragedy by Chikamatsu Monzaemon

The Love Suicides at Amijima (Shinjū Ten no Amijima or Shinjūten no Amijima 心中天の網島) is a domestic play (sewamono) by Japanese playwright Chikamatsu Monzaemon. Originally written for the bunraku puppet theatre, it was adapted into kabuki shortly after its premiere on 3 January 1721. It is widely regarded as one of his greatest domestic plays and was hailed by Donald Keene as “Chikamatsu’s masterpiece”.

== Adaptations ==
The Japanese new wave filmmaker Masahiro Shinoda directed a stylized adaptation of the story as Double Suicide in 1969.

Milwaukee, Wisconsin-based Dale Gutzman (book, lyrics) and Todd Wellman (score) debuted the musical adaption Amijima in 2007.

The Australian National University's Za Kabuki performed a version of the play in 2005, directed by Mr. Shun Ikeda.

Japanese-Korean artist Tomoka Takahashi directed an adapted version with an original score in 2026, composed by Alicia Erlandson at The New School College of Performing Arts.
