= Chikamatsu Monzaemon =

Japanese playwright (1653–1725)

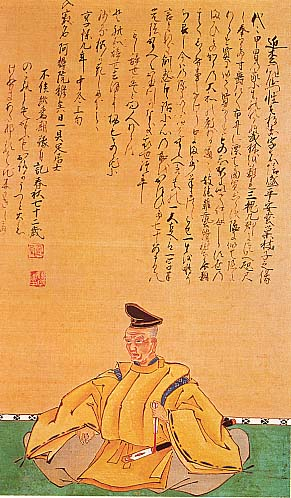
- Born: Sugimori Nobumori; 1653; Echizen Province (Currently Fukui Prefecture, Japan)
- Died: January 6, 1725 (aged 71–72)

Chikamatsu Monzaemon (Note: Japanese pronunciation: [tɕi̥.kaꜜ.ma.tsɯ | mon.dzaꜜ.e.moɴ, tɕi̥.ka.ma.tsɯ mon.dzaꜜ.e.moɴ, tɕi̥.kaꜜ.ma.tsɯ | moꜜn.dza.e.moɴ]) (近松 門左衛門; 1653 – 6 January 1725), real name Sugimori Nobumori (杉森 信盛), was a Japanese dramatist of jōruri, the form of puppet theater that later came to be known as bunraku, and the live-actor drama, kabuki. The Encyclopædia Britannica has written that he is "widely regarded as the greatest Japanese dramatist." His most famous plays deal with double-suicides of honor-bound lovers. Of his puppet plays, around 70 are jidaimono (時代物) (historical romances), and 24 are sewamono (世話物) (domestic tragedies). The domestic plays are today considered the core of his artistic achievement, particularly works such as The Courier for Hell (1711) and The Love Suicides at Amijima (1721). His histories are viewed less positively, though The Battles of Coxinga (1715) remains praised.

== Biography ==
Chikamatsu was born Sugimori Nobumori to a samurai family. There is disagreement about his birthplace. The most popular theory suggests he was born in Echizen Province, but there are other plausible locations, including Hagi, Nagato Province. His father, Sugimori Nobuyoshi, served as a medical doctor to the daimyō Matsudaira in Echizen. His mother was the daughter of Okamoto Ichiku, a physician to the Echizen domain, and Chikamatsu's younger brother later became the physician and medical author Okamoto Ippō.

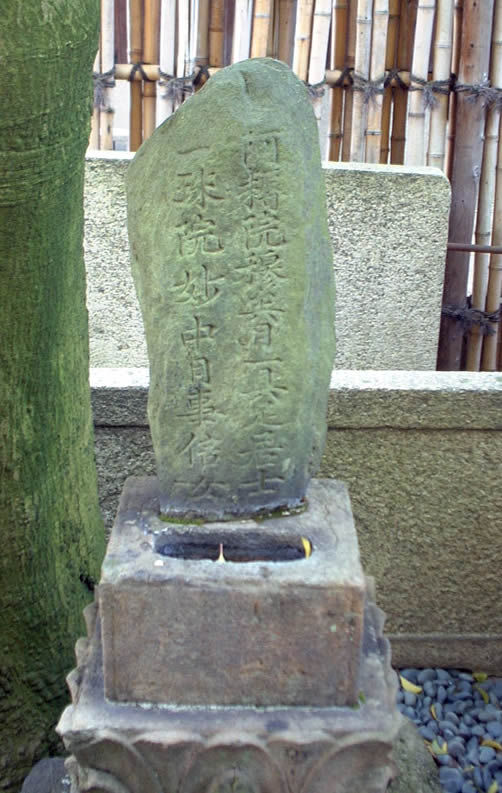
Tomb of Chikamatsu at Kōsaiji temple

In those days, doctors who served the daimyō held samurai status. But Chikamatsu's father lost his office and became a rōnin, a masterless samurai. At some point in his teens, between 1664 and 1670, Chikamatsu moved with his father to the imperial capital of Kyoto, where he served for a few years as an obscure page for a civil noble family. Other than that, little is known about this period of Chikamatsu's life. He published his first known literary work during this period, a haiku that appeared in 1671. After he served as a page, he next appears in records of the Gonshō-ji (近松寺) temple in Ōmi Province, in present-day Shiga Prefecture. The temple has long been suggested as the origin of his pen name Chikamatsu, a kun reading of 近松.

With the 1683 Kyoto production of his puppet play about the Soga brothers (The Soga Successors or The Soga Heir; Yotsugi Soga), Chikamatsu became known as a playwright. The Soga Successors is believed to have been Chikamatsu's first play, although 15 earlier anonymous plays have sometimes been attributed to him. Chikamatsu also wrote plays for kabuki theatre between 1684 and 1695, most of them intended for performance by the famous actor Sakata Tōjūrō (1647–1709). From 1695 until 1705, Chikamatsu wrote almost exclusively kabuki plays, after which he abruptly and almost completely abandoned the genre. The exact reason is unknown, although speculation is rife: perhaps puppets were more biddable and controllable than ambitious kabuki actors, perhaps Chikamatsu no longer considered kabuki worth writing for as Tōjūrō was about to retire, or perhaps the growing popularity of puppet theater was economically irresistible. C. Andrew Gerstle argues that Chikamatsu's collaborations with various performers affected his development as a playwright. His collaborations with kabuki practitioners led to more realistic characters, while his later collaboration with Takeda Izumo led to heightened theatricality.

In 1705, early editions of The Mirror of Craftsmen of the Emperor Yōmei announced Chikamatsu as a staff playwright. In 1705 or 1706, Chikamatsu left Kyoto for Osaka, where puppet theater was even more popular. Chikamatsu's popularity peaked with his domestic plays about love suicides and with the blockbuster success of The Battles of Coxinga in 1715, but patrons' tastes later turned to more sensational, gore-filled spectacles and cruder antics. Chikamatsu's plays fell out of use, and the music itself was lost for many of them. He died on January 6, 1725, in either Amagasaki, Hyōgo, or Osaka. In 1706, he wrote a three-act puppet play entitled Goban Taiheiki ("A chronicle of great peace played on a chessboard"), based on the story of the Forty-seven rōnin, which became the basis of the later and much better-known Chūshingura.

Currently, 130 plays have been verified as Chikamatsu's work, and another 15, mostly early kabuki works, are suspected to also have been penned by him.

== Dramatic theory ==
Chikamatsu's dramatic theory is preserved chiefly in the preface to Hozumi Ikan's Naniwa Miyage, published posthumously in 1738. In an interview recorded therein, Chikamatsu rejects strict imitation of reality, arguing that "Art abides in the narrow gap between the flesh and the skin, the real and the unreal." The passage has been interpreted as a theory of realism contrasting conceptual realism, which evokes emotion through action, dialogue, social role, and plot, with surface realism, which risks seeming vacant or eerie when it only imitates outward appearance.

== Reception ==
Chikamatsu's bunraku (jōruri) pieces, of which 24 are sewamono (domestic plays), came to be regarded as high literature in the Meiji and Taishō eras. Many have argued that his genius was "his masterful depiction of the passions, obsessions, and irrationality of the human heart." While Chikamatsu's jidaimono (history plays) were considered more important in his own time, the domestic tragedies are now "the main focus of critical attention and the more frequently performed", praised as deeply drawn in their portrayals of commoners. The Love Suicides at Sonezaki (1703), one of the earliest domestic plays in puppet theater, was a hit that revived the fortunes of the Takemoto Theater in Osaka. While it is not considered as strong as his later play The Love Suicides at Amijima (1721), Donald Keene praised the death passage as "one of the loveliest passages in Japanese literature". Also, it was written in Early Modern Japanese Literature: An Anthology, 1600–1900 that The Drum of the Waves of Horikawa (1707) is "of considerable interest for its exploration of female sexuality and its implicit critique of the life of lower-level samurai". Rei Sasaguchi listed the same play as one of Chikamatsu's most striking bunraku works along with The Couriers of Love to the Other World.

The Love Suicides at Amijima is generally regarded as the greatest of his domestic plays, though The Courier for Hell (1711), The Uprooted Pine (1718), and The Woman-Killer and the Hell of Oil (1721) have also been praised as works "of exceptional power". The last of the three initially was not well-received, and acquired a high reputation only in the late 19th century. Robert Nichols wrote that The Almanac of Love (1715) is highly regarded. Kenneth P. Kirkwood argued that the work is somewhat thin in texture but "nevertheless reveals the playwright's skill in making a dramatic plot out of the slightest materials." In a review of Gerstle's Chikamatsu: Five Late Plays, Katherine Saltzman-Li praised the "depth of character" achieved in Twins at the Sumida River (1720) through the various allusions.

The histories are mostly considered weaker, with Nichols writing that character in them tends to be subordinated to plot. The Battles of Coxinga (1715), however, ran for seventeen months and became the classical model for later history plays. It remains in the repertoires of both the bunraku and kabuki traditions, and Donald Keene referred to it as the only jidaimono "with real literary value". Keisei hotoke no hara (1699) and Keisei mibu dainembutsu (1702) are among the most renowned kabuki plays, though Keene argued that even they are "inferior in every respect" to the jōruri works written around the same period. Nichols listed The Courtesan's Frankincense, The Tethered Steed, and Fair Ladies at a Game of Poem-Cards as the best histories. Anne Walthall at UC Irvine said that the "vivid portrayal of interpersonal relations and individual personality [in Love Suicides on the Eve of the Kōshin Festival] provides excellent evidence why Chikamatsu's domestic plays have become more popular than his historical dramas." "Devil's Island", the second scene of the second act of Heike and the Island of Women (1719), became part of the kabuki repertory in the 19th century and today is usually performed in jōruri and kabuki as a single play.

== Adaptations ==
=== Film adaptations ===
- Kenji Mizoguchi's black and white film Chikamatsu Monogatari (literally, 'a story from Chikamatsu' but given titles in French "Les amants crucifiées" and in English "The Crucified Lovers"] is a 1954 film based on a domestic lover-suicide play by Chikamatsu called Daikyōji Mukashi Goyomi (1715).
- Masahiro Shinoda's celebrated 1969 film, Shinjū: Ten no Amijima (billed in English as Double Suicide) employs cinematic techniques based on bunraku conventions and takes as its basis Chikamatsu's play The Love Suicides at Amijima.
- The Love Suicides at Sonezaki (1978 film)
- The Love Suicides at Sonezaki (1981 film)

=== Opera ===
- Japanese composer Mayako Kubo's opera Osan, an adaptation of Shinjū: Ten no Amijima that premiered at the New National Theatre Tokyo in February 2005.

== Major works ==
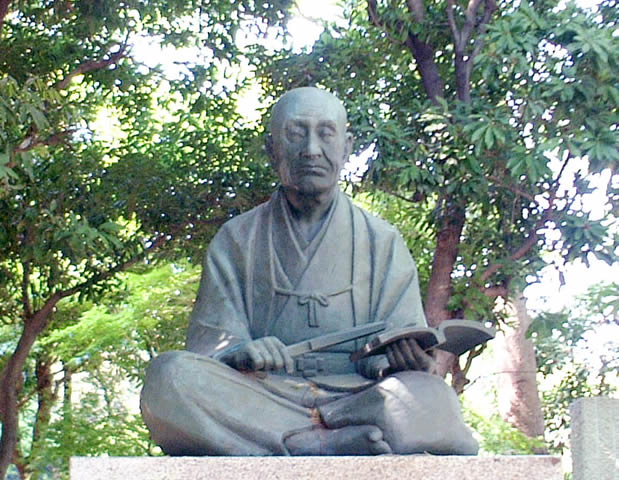
Statue of Chikamatsu Monzaemon at Amagasaki, Hyogo

=== Jōruri ===
- Kagekiyo Victorious (Shusse kagekiyo 出世景清) (1685)
- The Love Suicides at Sonezaki (Sonezaki shinjū 曾根崎心中) (1703)
- The Night Song of Yosaku from Tamba (Tamba Yosaku machiyo no komurobushi 丹波与作待夜のこむろぶし)
- The Courier for Hell (Meido no hikyaku 冥途の飛脚) (1711)
- The Almanac of Love (Koi hakke hashiragoyomi) (1715)
- The Battles of Coxinga (Kokusen'ya kassen 国姓爺合戦) (1715)
- The Uprooted Pine (Nebiki no Kadomatsu 寿の門松) (1718)
- The Love Suicides at Amijima (Shinjū Ten no Amijima 心中天網島) (1721)
- The Woman-Killer and the Hell of Oil (Onnagoroshi abura no jigoku 女殺油地獄) (1721)

=== Kabuki ===
- The Courtesan on Buddha Plain (Keisei hotoke no hara けいせい仏の原) (1699)

=== Dramatic theory ===
- Naniwa Miyage (1738), written by Hozumi Ikan and preserving statements attributed to Chikamatsu on the art of puppet theater

=== Translations into English ===
- Major Plays of Chikamatsu, translated and introduced by Donald Keene. NY: Columbia University Press. 1961/1990.
- Chikamatsu: Five Late Plays, translated by C. Andrew Gerstle. 2001. Consists of:
  - Twins at the Sumida River (Futago sumidagawa, 1720)
  - Lovers Pond in Settsu Province (Tsu no kuni meoto-ike, 1721)
  - Battles at Kawa-nakajima (Shinsh kawa-nakajima kassen, 1721)
  - Love Suicides on the Eve of the Kishin Festival (Shinju yoigoshin, 1722)
  - Tethered Steed and the Eight Provinces of Kanto (Kanhasshu tsunagi-uma, 1724)

== See also ==
- Japanese literature
- List of Japanese authors
- Gagaku

== Sources ==
- Keene, Donald (1999). World Within Walls: Japanese Literature of the Pre-modern Era, 1600–1867, Volume 1. Columbia University Press. ISBN 0231114672.
- Nichols, Robert (2010). Masterpieces of Chikamatsu. Routledge. ISBN 978-1136913433.
- Shirane, Haruo, ed. (2002). Early Modern Japanese Literature: An Anthology, 1600-1900. Columbia University Press. ISBN 0231507437.
