= The Love Suicides at Sonezaki =

1703 Bunraku play by Chikamatsu Monzaemon

The Love Suicides at Sonezaki (曾根崎心中, Sonezaki Shinjū) is a jōruri play by the Japanese playwright Chikamatsu Monzaemon. The double suicides that occurred on May 22, 1703, inspired Chikamatsu to write this play and thus The Love Suicides at Sonezaki made its debut performance on June 20, 1703. Chikamatsu added new scenes in the 1717 revival including the villain's punishment. The Love Suicides at Sonezaki's reception was popular and helped springboard Chikamatsu's future success as a playwright. In the first year alone since the play's premiere, no less than seventeen couples committed double suicide. In fact, the bakufu banned Chikamatsu's shinjū plays in 1722 because of their content's popularity. The Love Suicides at Sonezaki was Chikamatsu's first "domestic tragedy" or "domestic play" (sewamono) and his first love-suicide play (shinjūmono). Until this play, the common topic for jōruri was jidaimono or "history plays" while kabuki performances showed domestic plays. The Love Suicides at Sonezaki separates into three scenes, staged over a day and a night. The two central characters are an orphaned oil clerk named Tokubei and Ohatsu, the courtesan he loves. There is a beginning scene that shows Ohatsu going on a pilgrimage that performances and translations often leave out. This play also includes a religious aspect involving Confucianism and Buddhism.

== Plot ==
In the first scene, Tokubei and an apprentice named Chozo visit the firm's customers at Osaka's Ikudama Shrine. They deliver their wares and collect the bills, when Tokubei encounters Ohatsu. He sends the apprentice away and talks to Ohatsu, who berates him for making her worry due to a lapse in communication. Moved by her tears, Tokubei tells her his troubles. Tokubei works for his uncle at his firm. Tokubei's honest performance impresses him and as a result, he wants Tokubei to marry his wife's niece. Because Tokubei loves Ohatsu, he tries to refuse politely. The uncle continues to try to convince Tokubei to agree to the match by talking secretly to Tokubei's stepmother. She returns to her home village and takes the two kamme dowry the uncle provides. (Two kamme is about one thousand dollars).

This agreement remains unknown to Tokubei until his uncle tries to force him into the marriage. Tokubei makes his refusal absolute and this angers his uncle. He fires Tokubei from the firm, demands the return of the two kamme (which Tokubei does not have), and says he will exile Tokubei from Osaka. Tokubei goes to his village and with the villagers' aid, forces the silver out of his stepmother and returns to Osaka. On his return, "Kuheiji the oil merchant", a close friend, tells Tokubei that he needs a loan of two kamme or else he will go bankrupt. Since Tokubei does not need to return the two kamme until several days after Kuheiji promises to return the money, he gives the loan to Kuheiji.

Here Tokubei finishes recounting the events that took place before the start of the play. As he finishes, Kuheiji enters the temple grounds with a band of revelers. Tokubei seizes the chance to ask Kuheiji to repay the now-overdue loan but Kuheiji denies the existence of any such debt. When Tokubei produces the promissory note Kuheiji stamped with his seal, Kuheiji dismisses it as an extortion attempt, revealing that before he stamped the promissory note, he reported the seal as lost. Tokubei realizes Kuheiji's deception and attacks him. Kuheiji and his followers beat him up and the scenes ends with Ohatsu rushed away in a palanquin and Tokubei leaving in defeat.

The second scene takes place in the evening at Ohatsu's place of employment, the Temma House. While Ohatsu hears two other courtesans gossip about Tokubei, she sees Tokubei outside and goes to him. He tells her what transpired but their conversation is cut short when people call Ohatsu to go inside. She hides him in her clothes and joins the others. Kuheiji arrives and spreads the story that Tokubei tried to extort money from him. After Kuheiji boasts that he thinks Tokubei will be executed, Ohatsu and Tokubei communicate through their hands and feet. Through this method, Ohatsu asks if Tokubei wishes to die and he signals that he does by passing her ankle across his throat. Ohatsu states that she wishes to die as well when she reprimands Kuheiji when he overhears her allusion to Tokubei's death wish. Kuheiji leaves and night falls. Scene two ends with Tokubei and Ohatsu sneaking past the sleeping servant guarding the exit.

Scene three begins with a poetic dialogue between the two lovers. The narrator interjects the occasional comment that sets the scenes for their journey. This part is considered a michiyuki or a lyrical journey. The two travel from Dojima to the "Wood of Tenjin" (Tenjin being Sugawara no Michizane) during the dialogue. Tokubei and Ohatsu come across an unusual tree in the Sonezaki shrine which has both a pine and palm tree growing out of the same trunk. They decide to make this the site of their death and so Tokubei binds Ohatsu to the tree. Tokubei tries to stab her throat with his razor but misses the first few times. When he strikes her throat, Tokubei thrusts the razor into his own throat and the two die together.

== The importance of setting ==
Scenes one and two take place at Osaka while scene three takes place from Dojima to the Sonezaki shrine. However, the original performance included a scene before scene one where the viewers see Ohatsu go on a pilgrimage to the temples of Kannon at Osaka. The first stop in the pilgrimage was Tayuji which is close to Sonezaki Wood. In Mahayana Buddhism, Kannon is a bodhisattva who helps people in need and the goal of those on the pilgrimage is to be reborn in Fudaraku (Kannon's paradise). The purpose behind the scene remains unclear and differing opinions exist. One opinion constitutes that Ohatsu's pilgrimage introduces an informal aspect to the play because the scene can be divided into a prelude and Ohatsu's pilgrimage. Another opinion disagrees, stating that the entire scene is a prelude to the play. Because the scene begins with lines from Tamura (a Noh play), the scene starts as semi-formal. This mode continues until Ohatsu's pilgrimage; the pilgrimage turns the scenes informal through its similarities with michiyuki. One argument points out that this scene bridges the gap between jidaimono and sewamono since jidaimono features heroes and the divine while sewamono shows everyday people. Another theory explains that the scene shows a difference between old and new jōruri using the two different pilgrimages shown in the prologue and scene one. The prologue's pilgrimage shows Ohatsu alone making her pilgrimage while in scene one, Ohatsu is with a client; the first pilgrimage represents an act of faith while the second represents business. This alludes to the medieval vs. urban Edo period Japan and the argument states that this resembles old and new jōruri.

== Religious implications ==
Although the purpose of double suicide in The Love Suicides at Sonezaki can show the conflict between giri and ninjō, a deeper conflict between Confucian ethics and Pure Land Buddhism can be seen. Giri is a social obligation while ninjō is passion or emotion. Western scholars such as Donald Keene argue that shinjū is based on a Confucian perspective on the conflict between giri and ninjō. In addition, other scholars see the Pure Land Buddhist influence as secondary in this play and see shinju as making fun of Buddhist principles. One theory states the act of shinju redeems the characters of their past through their final act and the Amidist hope of being with each other beyond death (In Pure Land Buddhism, the buddha Amida carries people to his pure land after death); Tokubei achieves this in michiyuki when he recites the nembutsu (a prayer to the buddha Amida to go to the Western Paradise after death). Heine points out that the characters in the shinju plays are rejected by the societal structure (giri) and the anti-structure floating world (ninjō) and are only released from this through salvation by way of shinju. Shinju may not be about ninjo's victory over giri but transcending their conflict via suicide. The michiyuki may symbolize Tokubei and Ohatsu's transformation through its relationship with Buddhist traditions like yamabushi pilgrimages. On yamabushi pilgrimages, one would travel to a shrine and be purified; this alludes to Tokubei and Ohatsu's purification. The Buddhist idea of impermanence shown in shinju may be contrasted with Confucian ethics. In the final scene, Tokubei is bothered because he did not repay his uncle and says it will last after his death and the Buddhist idea of karma states that actions surpass the limitations of time. The michiyuki connects Confucian giri with Buddhist mujo (impermanence) because Tokubei and Ohatsu have a conviction to undergo shinju in hopes to go to the Western Paradise.

== Nakamura Ganjiro III and kabuki adaptations ==
While Chikamatsu wrote The Love Suicides at Sonezaki as a jōruri play, both bunraku and kabuki versions exist. Bunraku uses puppets and Kabuki uses actors known as onnagata for all roles. One onnagata, Nakamura Ganjiro III, is a Japanese Living National Treasure (a high honor bestowed on artists by a government) and has played the role of Ohatsu over 1225 times according to a 2006 theater review. In this performance, Nakamura Ganjiro III's outfit consisted of a layered purple and brown kimono with a gold and black obi. The set design included a hanamichi runway cutting through the orchestra section. The lighting was designed to portray the time difference in each scene. Singing narrators and shamisen players accompanied the play. In a 2001 review, Klett states in the second scene when Ohatsu defends Tokubei, Ganjiro talks slowly in an agonizing way and is accompanied by a drum and guitar by musicians onstage. The set in this performance changed depending on the act. At Ikudama shrine, the set include hanging purple flowers, trees, grass and red drapes. In the second act, the set had hanging lanterns and paneled walls to resemble the brothel. Unlike in the 2006 rendition, Ohatsu wore a white kimono. In the 2006 and 2001 review, Ganjiro's son, Nakamura Kanjaku V, played the part of Tokubei continuing a family tradition; Nakamura Ganjiro III acted alongside his father as well. Nakamura Ganjiro III founded the Chikamatsu-za (a theater organization) in 1981 to accurately perform and celebrate Chikamatsu's works.

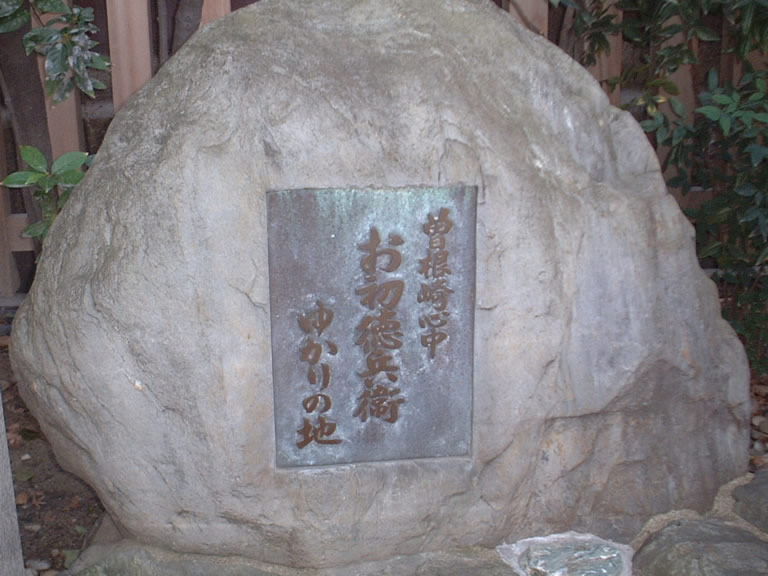
A memorial

== Adaptations ==
The play has been filmed a number of times, including a 1978 film, and a 1981 film featuring Bunraku puppets. Tsuyunoten Shrine in Osaka, commonly referred to as "Ohatsu Tenjin", houses a commemorative stone monument and a bronze statue of Ohatsu and Tokubei.

A manga adaptation by Kawashita Mizuki, titled Sonezaki Shinjuu, retells the story in a positive way.

The play also figures prominently in the 2025 film Kokuho.
