= Donald Keene =

American-born Japanese academic (1922–2019)

Donald Keene Junior Third Rank
- キーン ドナルド
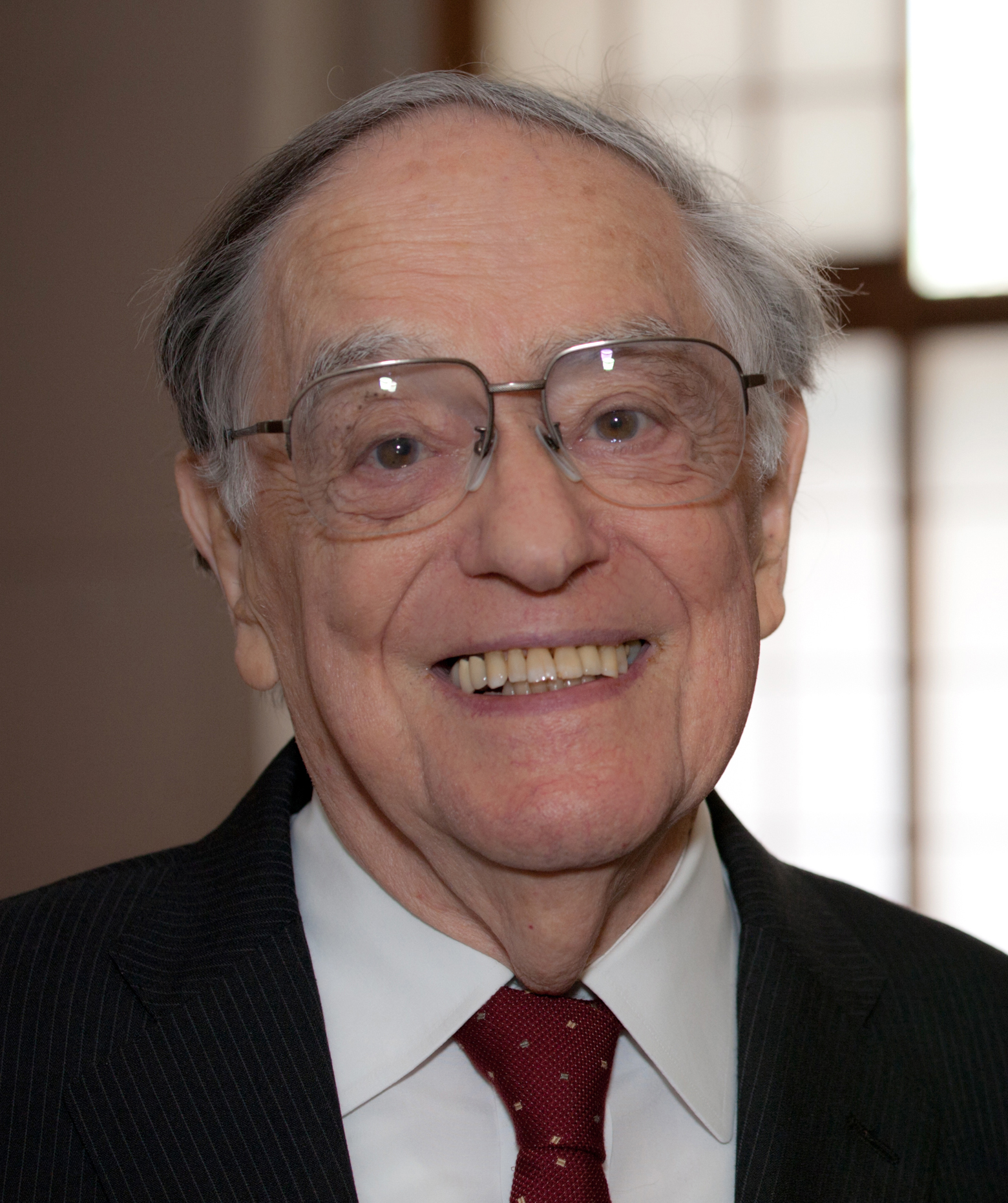
- Keene in 2011
- Born: June 18, 1922; New York City, U.S
- Died: February 24, 2019 (aged 96); Tokyo, Japan
- Citizenship: United States (1922–2012); Japan (2012–2019)
- Education: Columbia University (BA, MA, PhD); Harvard University; Cambridge University (MA)
- Occupations: Scholar, historian, professor, writer, linguist
- Organizations: Cambridge University (1949–1954); Columbia University (1955–2011)
- Children: 1 (adopted)
- Awards: Kikuchi Kan Prize (1962); Yamagata Banto Prize (1983); Yomiuri Prize (1985); Japanese Literature Award (1985); Fukuoka Prize (1991); 2nd Class, Order of the Rising Sun (1993); Asahi Prize (1998); Mainichi Publication Culture Award (2002); Person of Cultural Merit (2002); Order of Culture (2008); Junior Third Rank (2019)

Donald Lawrence Keene (June 18, 1922 – February 24, 2019) was an American-born Japanese scholar, historian, teacher, writer, and translator of Japanese literature. He was Professor Emeritus and Shincho Professor Emeritus of Japanese Literature at Columbia University, where he taught for over fifty years. Soon after the 2011 Tōhoku earthquake and tsunami, he retired from Columbia, moved to Japan permanently, and acquired citizenship under the name Kīn Donarudo (キーン ドナルド) which is essentially his birth name in the Japanese name order. This was also his poetic pen name (雅号, gagō) and occasional nickname, spelled in the ateji form 鬼怒鳴門. (Note: Glossed as 鬼怒(キーン・ド)鳴門(ナルド) or kīn do narudo; 鬼怒 is usually pronounced kinu, as in Kinugawa River, and 鳴門 as naruto, as in the Naruto Strait, which are both well-known place names, yielding the reading kinu naruto. A further twist is that 怒 can also be read as do, corresponding to the Do- in Donald.)

== Early life ==
Donald Lawrence Keene was born in the Flatbush neighborhood of New York City's Brooklyn borough on June 18, 1922. His father was an international trade businessman while his mother stayed at home to raise Keene and his elder sister. In July 1931, amid the economic crisis of the Great Depression, a nine-year-old Keene begged his father to allow him to accompany him on a business trip to Europe, to which his father agreed. He and his father boarded a United States Lines ship sailing to Normandy, disembarking at Cherbourg before they continued on to Paris by train. Keene met a girl around his age in Paris, but the language barrier made it difficult to talk with her, so he proceeded to sing Frère Jacques to her as it was the only thing he knew in French. These experiences instilled in him a great sense of curiosity for cultures abroad, as well as learning languages. In 1933, his elder sister died of an illness and his parents divorced.

== Education and military service ==
Keene lived with his mother and attended James Madison High School, showing great academic achievement. He then enrolled at Columbia University, where he received a bachelor's degree 1942, studying under Mark Van Doren, Moses Hadas, Lionel Trilling, and Jacques Barzun. While there, he was obsessed with Arthur Waley's English translation of The Tale of Genji, and he became increasingly interested in Japanese culture after he met Ryūsaku Tsunoda, who became a mentor and key influence on his writings. Following his graduation, Keene enlisted in the United States Navy under the Selective Training and Service Act of 1940. A self-described pacifist, he was not enthusiastic about joining, especially after hearing about the attack on Pearl Harbor.

While in the Navy, Keene successfully applied to the U.S. Navy Japanese Language School in Boulder, Colorado, and in Berkeley, California, where he learned Japanese. He served as an intelligence officer and in the Pacific region during World War II, where he translated for Japanese prisoners, some of whom remained his friends long after the war finished; he later recalled finding poignant diaries of dead Japanese soldiers, stained with their blood, and having his attempts to deliver the diaries to the soldiers' families thwarted by the Navy. Upon his discharge from the Navy, he returned to Columbia and earned a master's degree in 1947. He studied for a year at Harvard University before transferring to Cambridge University in England on the Henry Fellowship, where he earned a second master's degree and became a Fellow of Cambridge's Corpus Christi College from 1948 to 1954, as well as a lecturer from 1949 to 1955. In the interim, he earned a PhD from Columbia in 1949 and studied at Kyoto University in 1953. While staying at Cambridge, he met his idol Waley, who had sparked his initial interest in Asian culture.

== Career ==
Keene went on to become a Japanologist who published about 25 English-language books on Japanese topics, including studies of Japanese literature and culture and translations of classical and modern Japanese literature. He also published about 30 books in Japanese, some of which have been translated from English. He was president of the Donald Keene Foundation for Japanese Culture.

== Personal life ==
In 2008, Emperor Akihito awarded Keene the Order of Culture, one of the highest honors bestowed by the Japanese Imperial House; as of 2025, he remains the only non-Japanese person to receive the award.

In January 2011, at the age of 88, Keene was taken to a Japanese hospital after becoming gravely ill; concerned that he was dying, he instead asked himself what he would do if he recovered, and quickly realized that he would rather live out the rest of his life in Japan than return to the U.S. The Tōhoku earthquake and tsunami struck Japan two months later; Keene soon announced that he would retire from Columbia University, leave his home in Morningside Heights, and settle in Japan. He was already known and respected in Japan by this point, and his relocation following the earthquake was universally welcomed.

According to the Financial Times, which referred to Keene as a legendary figure in Japan, "The announcement made headline news. Japanese spoke, many with tears in their eyes, of the courage he had given them in their hour of need." He told The New York Times, "Many foreigners are leaving Japan. People have asked me why I should be choosing this moment to spend the rest of my life in Japan. [...] I decided to move there to voluntarily and gladly join the people in time of disaster, because I have more friends there than I have here, and most of my awards have come there. I want to show my appreciation to the Japanese people, and I could think of no other way than to say I'd be with them."

Upon settling in Japan, Keene adopted the legal name Kīn Donarudo (キーン ドナルド) and acquired Japanese citizenship, which required him to relinquish his American citizenship as Japan does not permit multiple citizenship. Having long maintained a home in a suburb of Tokyo, he made it his primary home upon relocating. He never married and had no biological children. In 2012, at the age of 89, he utilized Japan's adult adoption process to adopt professional shamisen player Seiki Uehara as his son and heir. Uehara was 63 years old at the time.

== Death ==
Keene died of cardiac arrest in Tokyo at the age of 96 on February 24, 2019.

== Selected works ==
In an overview of writings by and about Keene, OCLC/WorldCat lists over 600 works in over 1,400 publications in 16 languages and over 39,000 library holdings.

=== Works in English ===
Year	Title	Publisher	Notes
1951	The Battles of Coxinga: Chikamatsu's Puppet Play, Its Background and Importance	Taylor's Foreign Press	
1952	The Japanese Discovery of Europe: Honda Toshiaki and Other Discoverers, 1720–1952	Routledge and K. Paul	Japanese trans.: 日本人の西洋発見 (錦正社, 1957), trans. 藤田豊 & 大沼雅彦; nihonjin no seiyou hakken; 日本人の西洋発見 (中公叢書, 1968), trans. 芳賀徹 [?trans of 2nd ed]
1955	Japanese Literature: An Introduction for Western Readers	Grove Press	
1956	Modern Japanese Literature: An Anthology	Grove Press	
1959	Living Japan	Doubleday	Japanese trans.: 生きている日本 (朝日出版社, 1973), trans. 江藤淳 & 足立康; ikiteiru nihon; Revised edition: 果てしなく美しい日本 (講談社学術文庫, 2002), trans. 足立康改 [?mistake. ?Separate work]
1961	Major Plays of Chikamatsu	Columbia University Press	
1961	Four Major Plays of Chikamatsu	Columbia University Press	
1965	Bunraku: The Art of the Japanese Puppet Theatre	Kodansha International	With Kaneko Hiroshi (photography) & Jun'ichirō Tanizaki (introduction); Japanese trans.: 文楽 (講談社, 1966), trans. 吉田健一; bunraku
1969	The Japanese Discovery of Europe, 1720–1830	Stanford University Press	Revised/2nd edition
1969	The Manyōshū	Columbia University Press	
1970	Twenty Plays of the Noh Theatre	Columbia University Press	
1975	War-Wasted Asia: Letters, 1945–46	Kodansha International	Japanese trans.: 昨日の戦地から (中央公論新社, 2006), trans. 松宮史朗; kinou no senchi kara
1976	World Within Walls: Japanese Literature of the Pre-Modern Era, 1600–1867	Henry Holt & Co	Second book in "A History of Japanese Literature" series; Japanese trans.: 日本文学史 近世篇, 2 vols. (中央公論社, 1976–77), trans. 徳岡孝夫; nihon bungakushi kinseihen
1978	Landscapes and Portraits: Appreciations of Japanese Culture	Kodansha International	
1978/79	Some Japanese Portraits	Kodansha America Inc	Japanese trans.: 日本文学散歩 (朝日選書, 1975), trans. 篠田一士; nihon bungaku sanpo
1979	Meeting with Japan	学生社	Japanese trans.: 日本との出会い (中央公論社, 1972), trans. 篠田一士; nihon tono deai
1981	Travels in Japan	Gakuseisha	Japanese trans.: 日本細見 (中央公論社, 1980), trans. 中矢一義; nihonsaiken
1984	Dawn to the West: Japanese Literature of the Modern Era: Fiction	Holt Rinehart & Winston	Third book in "A History of Japanese Literature" series
1984	Dawn to the West: Japanese Literature in the Modern Era: Poetry, Drama, Criticism	Holt Rinehart & Winston	Fourth book in "A History of Japanese Literature" series
1987	Dawn to the West: Japanese Literature in the Modern Era	Henry Holt & Co	
1988	The Pleasures of Japanese Literature	Columbia University Press	ISBN 978-0-231-06736-2; Japanese trans.: 古典の愉しみ (JICC, 1992; 宝島社, 2000)
1989	Introducing Kyoto	Kodansha America Inc	With Herbert E. Plutschow
1989	Travelers of a Hundred Ages: The Japanese As Revealed Through 1,000 Years of Diaries	Diane Publishing Co	Japanese trans.: 百代の過客 日記にみる日本人 (朝日選書, 1984 and 1988), trans. 金関寿夫; hyakudai no kakaku: nikkini miru nihonjin; Later published by Asahi, 2011 and 2012 [?trans of revised edition]
1989	Modern Japanese Novels and the West	Umi Research Press	
1990	No and Bunraku: Two Forms of Japanese Theatre	Columbia University Press	Japanese trans.: 能・文楽・歌舞伎 (講談社, 2001), trans. 吉田健一 & 松宮史朗; noh, bunraku, kabuki
1991	Appreciations of Japanese Culture	Kodansha America Inc	
1991	The Colors of Poetry: Essays in Classic Japanese Verse	Katydid Books	With Ooka Makoto
1992	Travelers of a Hundred Ages	Henry Holt & Co	
1993	Seeds in the Heart: Japanese Literature from Earliest Times to the Late Sixteenth Century	Henry Holt & Co	First book in "A History of Japanese Literature" series
1994	On Familiar Terms: A Journey Across Cultures	Kodansha America Inc	Reworking of 1990–1992 Japanese newspaper column; Japanese trans.: このひとすじにつながりて (朝日選書, 1993), trans. 金関寿夫; kono hitosuji ni tsunagarite
1995	Modern Japanese Diaries: The Japanese at Home and Abroad as Revealed Through Their Diaries	Henry Holt & Co	Later published by Columbia University Press, 1999 [?revised edition]; Japanese edition published first
1996	The Blue-Eyed Tarokaja: A Donald Keene Anthology	Columbia University Press	Editor: J. Thomas Rimer; Japanese trans.: 碧い眼の太郎冠者; aoi me no taroukaja
1996	On Familiar Terms: To Japan and Back, a Lifetime Across Cultures	Kodansha America Inc	
1999	もう一つの母国、日本へ – Living in Two Countries	Kodansha International	English and Japanese bilingual text, trans. 塩谷紘
2001	Japan at the Dawn of the Modern Age: Woodblock Prints from the Meiji Era, 1868–1912	Museum of Fine Arts Boston	With Anne Nishimura & Frederic A. Sharf
2001	Sources of Japanese Tradition: From Earliest Times to 1600	Columbia University Press	Compiled by Donald Keene, Wm. Theodore De Bary, George Tanabe and Paul Varley
2002	Emperor of Japan: Meiji and His World, 1852–1912	Columbia University Press	Japanese trans.: 明治天皇 (新潮社, 2001), trans. 角地幸男; meiji tennou; Also published in 4 volumes, 2007
2002	Masterful Illusions: Japanese Prints from the Anne Van Biema Collection	University of Washington Press	With Lee Bruschke-Johnson & Ann Yonemura
2002	Five Modern Japanese Novelists	Columbia University Press	Japanese trans.: 思い出の作家たち―谷崎・川端・三島・安部・司馬 (新潮社, 2005), trans. 松宮史朗; omoide no sakkatachi: Tanizaki, Kawabata, Mishima, Abe, Shiba
2003	Yoshimasa and the Silver Pavilion: The Creation of the Soul of Japan	Columbia University Press	Japanese trans.: 足利義政と銀閣寺 (中央公論新社, 2008), trans. 角地幸男; Yoshimasa to ginkakuji
2006	Frog in the Well: Portraits of Japan by Watanabe Kazan 1793–1841	Columbia University Press	Japanese trans.: 渡辺崋山 (新潮社, 2007), trans. 角地幸男; Watanabe Kazan
2008	Chronicles of My Life: An American in the Heart of Japan	Columbia University Press	Japanese trans.: 私と20世紀のクロニカル (中央公論新社, 2007), trans. 角地幸男; watashi to 20 seiki no kuronikaru; Later published as ドナルド・キーン自伝 (中公公論新社, 2011); Spanish trans.: Un Occidental En Japon (Nocturna Ediciones, 2011), trans. José Pazó Espinosa
2010	So Lovely a Country Will Never Perish: Wartime Diaries of Japanese Writers	Columbia University Press	Japanese trans.: 日本人の戦争 作家の日記を読む (文藝春秋, 2009), trans. 角地幸男; nihonjin no sensou: sakka no nikki wo yomu
2013	The Winter Sun Shines In: A Life of Masaoka Shiki	Columbia University Press	Japanese trans.: 正岡子規 (新潮社, 2012), trans. 角地幸男; Masaoka Shiki
2016	The First Modern Japanese: The Life of Ishikawa Takuboku	Columbia University Press	

=== Works in Japanese ===
Year	Japanese title	Romanized title	Publisher	Notes
1957–1975	ドナルド・キーンの日本文学散歩	Donald Kīn no Nihonbungaku Sanpo	週刊朝日	Column in Asahi Weekly
1963	日本の文学	Nihon no Bungaku	筑摩書房	Trans. 吉田健一
1972	日本の作家	Nihon no Sakka	中央公論社	
1972	日本人と日本文化 司馬遼太郎との対談	Nihonjin to Nihonbunka: Shiba Ryōtarō to no Taidan	中公新書	In conversation with Ryotaro Shiba; republished 1992 as 世界のなかの日本
1973	反劇的人間	Hangekiteki Ningen	中公新書	In conversation with Kobo Abe
1973	東と西のはざまで 大岡昇平と対談	Higashi to Nishi no Hazama de	朝日出版社	In conversation with Ooka Shouhei
1973	悼友紀行 三島由紀夫の作品風土		中央公論社	With Tokuoka Takao
1977	ドナルド・キーンの音盤風刺花伝		音楽之友社	Later published as わたしの好きなレコード
1977	日本文学を読む	Nihonbungaku wo Yomu	新潮選書	
1979	日本の魅力 対談集	Nihon no Miryoku	中央公論社	Collection of conversations
1979	日本を理解するまで	Nihon wo Rikai suru Made	新潮社	
1979	日本文学のなかへ	Nihonbungaku no Naka e	文藝春秋	
1980	音楽の出会いとよろこび	Ongaku no Deai to Yorokobi	音楽之友社	Trans. 中矢一義; republished 中央公論社 1992
1981	ついさきの歌声	Tsuisaki no Utagoe	中央公論社	Trans. 中矢一義
1981	私の日本文学逍遥	Watashi no Nihonbungaku Shōyō	新潮社	
1983	日本人の質問	Nihonjin no Shitsumon	朝日選書	
1983–1984	百代の過客 日記にみる日本人	Hyakudai no Kakaku: Nikki ni Miru Nihonjin	Asahi Evening News	Column
1984–1997	日本文学史	Nihonbungakushi	中央公論社	Translation of "History of Japanese Literature" series; various volumes and editions
1986	少し耳の痛くなる話	Sukoshi Mimi no Itakunaru Hanashi	新潮社	
1987	二つの母国に生きて	Futatsu no Bokoku ni Ikite	Asahi	Trans. 塩谷紘
1990	古典を楽しむ 私の日本文学	Koten wo Tanoshimu: Watashi no Nihonbungaku	朝日選書	
1990	日本人の美意識	Nihonjin no Biishiki	中央公論	
1990–1992	このひとすじにつながりて	Kono Hitosuji ni Tsunagarite	Asahi Evening News	Column
1992	声の残り 私の文壇交遊録	Koe no Nokori: Watashi no Bundan Kōyūroku	Asahi	
1998	三島由紀夫未発表書簡 ドナルド・キーン氏宛の97通	Mishima Yukio Mihappyō Shokan	中央公論社	Editor; 97 letters from Yukio Mishima
2000	日本語の美	Nihongo no Bi	中公文庫	
2003	明治天皇を語る	Meiji Tennō wo Kataru	新潮新書	Based on lecture series
2003	日本文学は世界のかけ橋	Nihonbungaku wa Sekai no Kakebashi	たちばな出版	
2004	同時代を生きて 忘れえぬ人びと	Dōjidai wo Ikite Wasureenu Hitobito	岩波書店	With Jakucho Setouchi & Shunsuke Tsurumi
2005	私の大事な場所	Watashi no Daiji na Basho	中央公論新社	Republished 2010
2011	戦場のエロイカ・シンフォニー 私が体験した日米戦	Senjō no Eroica Shinfonī: Watashi ga Keiken shita Nichibei-sen	藤原書店	With Koike Masayuki
2011–2020	ドナルド・キーン著作集(全15巻・別巻)	Donald Kīn Chosakushū (Zen-15kan)	新潮社	Complete works (15 volumes)
2012	日本を、信じる	Nihon wo, Shinjiru	中央公論新社	With Setouchi Jakuchou
2013	私が日本人になった理由―日本語に魅せられて	Watashi ga Nihonjin ni Natta Riyū—Nihongo ni Miserarete	PHP研究所	

=== Translations ===
Year	Original author	Title	Publisher	Notes
1951	Chikamatsu Monzaemon	The Battles of Coxinga: Chikamatsu's Puppet Play, Its Background and Importance	Taylor's Foreign Press	
1956	Dazai Osamu	The Setting Sun	New Directions	
1958	Dazai Osamu	No Longer Human	New Directions	
1961	Chikamatsu Monzaemon	The Major Plays of Chikamatsu	Columbia University Press	Includes critical commentary
1967	Yoshida Kenkō	Essays in Idleness: The Tsurezuregusa of Kenko	Columbia University Press	
1967	Mishima Yukio	Five Modern Noh Plays	Tuttle	Including Madame de Sade
1971		Chushingura: The Treasury of Loyal Retainers, a Puppet Play	Columbia University Press	
1973	Mishima Yukio	After the Banquet	Random House Inc	
1975	Abe Kobo	The Man Who Turned into a Stick: Three Related Plays	Columbia University Press	Original text published by Tokyo University Press
1981		The Tale of the Shining Princess	Metropolitan Museum of Art and Viking Press	
1986	Abe Kobo	Friends: A Play	Tuttle	
1997	Abe Kobo	Three Plays	Columbia University Press	
1997	Matsuo Bashō	The Narrow Road to Oku	Kodansha America Inc	
1998	Kawabata Yasunari	The Tale of the Bamboo Cutter	Kodansha America Inc	
1998	Yamamoto Yuzo	One Hundred Sacks of Rice: A Stage Play	Nagaoka City Kome Hyappyo Foundation	
2001		The Tale of Genji	Kodansha International	Bilingual illustrated text with essay; with Miyata Masayuki (illustrations) & H. Mack Horton
2003	Oda Makoto	The Breaking Jewel	Columbia University Press	

=== Editor ===
Year	Title	Publisher	Notes
1960	Anthology of Japanese Literature from the Earliest Era to the Mid-Nineteenth Century	Grove Press	
1961	The Old Woman, the Wife, and the Archer: Three Modern Japanese Short Novels	Viking Press	
1987	Anthology of Chinese Literature: From the 14th Century to the Present Day	Grove Press	Co-editor with Cyril Birch
1994	Modern Japanese Literature from 1868 to the Present Day	Grove Press	
2000	Love Songs from the Man'Yoshu	Kodansha America Inc	

== Honorary degrees ==
Keene was awarded various honorary doctorates, from:

- University of Cambridge (1978)
- St. Andrews Presbyterian College (North Carolina, 1990)
- Middlebury College (Vermont, 1995)
- Columbia University (New York, 1997)
- Tohoku University (Sendai, 1997)
- Waseda University (Tokyo, 1998)
- Tokyo University of Foreign Studies (Tokyo, 1999)
- Keiwa College (Niigata, 2000)
- Kyoto Sangyo University (Kyoto, 2002)
- Kyorin University (Tokyo, 2007)
- Toyo University (Tokyo, 2011)
- Japan Women's University (Tokyo, 2012)
- Nishogakusha University (Kyoto, 2012)
- Doshisha University (Kyoto, 2013)

== Awards and commendations ==
- Guggenheim Fellowship, 1961
- Kikuchi Kan Prize (Kikuchi Kan Shō Society for the Advancement of Japanese Culture), 1962.
- Van Ameringen Distinguished Book Award, 1967
- Kokusai Shuppan Bunka Shō Taishō, 1969
- Kokusai Shuppan Bunka Shō, 1971
- Yamagata Banto Prize (Yamagata Bantō Shō), 1983
- The Japan Foundation Award (Kokusai Kōryū Kikin Shō), 1983
- Yomiuri Literary Prize (Yomiuri Bungaku Shō), 1985 (Keene was the first non-Japanese to receive this prize, for a book of literary criticism (Travellers of a Hundred Ages) in Japanese)
- Award for Excellence (Graduate Faculties Alumni of Columbia University), 1985
- Nihon Bungaku Taishō, 1985
- Donald Keene Center of Japanese Culture at Columbia University named in Keene's honour, 1986
- Tōkyō-to Bunka Shō, 1987
- NBCC (The National Book Critics Circle) Ivan Sandrof Award for Lifetime Achievement in Publishing, 1990
- The Fukuoka Asian Culture Prize (Fukuoka Ajia Bunka Shō), 1991
- Nihon Hōsō Kyōkai (NHK) Hōsō Bunka Shō, 1993
- Inoue Yasushi Bunka Shō (Inoue Yasushi Kinen Bunka Zaidan), 1995
- The Distinguished Achievement Award (from The Tokyo American Club) (for the lifetime achievements and unique contribution to international relations), 1995
- Award of Honor (from The Japan Society of Northern California), 1996
- Asahi Prize, 1997
- Mainichi Shuppan Bunka Shō (The Mainichi Newspapers), 2002
- The PEN/Ralph Manheim Medal for Translation, 2003
- Ango Award (from Niigata, Niigata), 2010

== National honors and decorations ==
=== Decorations ===
- (Order of the Rising Sun, Gold Rays with Neck Ribbon, Third Class, 1975)
- (Order of the Rising Sun, Gold and Silver Star, Second Class, 1993)
- (Order of Culture (Bunka kunshō), 2008)

=== Honors ===
- Person of Cultural Merit (Bunka Kōrōsha) (Japanese Government), 2002 (Keene was the third non-Japanese person to be designated "an individual of distinguished cultural service" by the Japanese government)
- Freedom of (meiyo kumin) Kita ward, Tokyo, 2006
