= Tales from Europe =

BBC TV anthology programme broadcast in the 1960s

- Genre: Children's television Anthology; Fantasy
- Narrated by: Various
- Country of origin: United Kingdom
- Original language: English (narrated or dubbed)

Production
- Producer: Peggy Miller
- Running time: Approx. 25 minutes
- Production company: BBC (presentation only)

Original release
- Network: BBC Television / BBC1
- Release: 1 October 1964 – 22 May 1969

Tales from Europe was a British children's television anthology strand, first broadcast on BBC 1 between 1 October 1964 and 22 May 1969. The series presented narrated or dubbed European films, primarily fairy tales and fantasy adventures, in episodic form for British audiences.

The programme consisted of a curated selection of films sourced from across Europe, including Eastern Europe and the Soviet Union. The films were originally produced for cinema release, and were edited by the BBC into episodic format for television broadcast.

Tales from Europe was an early example of international content acquisition in British children's broadcasting, which introduced British children to other cultures, languages and aesthetics. It is especially remembered for the East German film The Singing Ringing Tree.

== Background ==
In the early 1960s, BBC children's programming appeared increasingly didactic and old-fashioned compared with programmes from the competing commercial ITV network. These included Westerns, adventure films, and Disney cartoons, which proved particularly popular. At BBC children's television, however, imports from America were considered harmful to children, especially because of their depiction of violence. As airtime for children's and youth television grew longer over the years, there was an increasing need for programmes, which the BBC had to partially meet through imports. Acquisition of such content was possible via international television and film festivals, where broadcasters could purchase foreign-language productions.

== History ==
Peggy Miller, a producer in the department and a former wartime translator with experience in negotiating and adapting films from overseas broadcasters, began work in 1964 on a new children's strand under the banner title Tales From Europe. The department scouted foreign film festivals for suitable material, and the resulting strand provided access to high-production-value fantasy programming from abroad. They found films that were made not by television companies, but by their respective countries' national film industries, which were all heavily subsidised.

The films featured in Tales from Europe were acquired rather than produced by the BBC. Many originated as feature-length cinema productions created by state-funded studios in Eastern Europe. The BBC adapted these films for broadcast through editing and English-language dubbing. This approach allowed the corporation to present visually ambitious material at relatively low cost.

Edward Barnes, former head of children's programmes, recalls:

The Eastern Europeans were making first-class feature films for children, and they didn’t ask very much for them. We would re-edit them into short series, and, because we couldn’t afford dubbing, we’d add narration over the dialogue. This became virtue from necessity, because the viewers could hear the original language and it gave them a taste of other cultures and other worlds.

The imported productions originated from countries including East Germany, Czechoslovakia, Poland, Hungary, Sweden, Denmark, France, Switzerland and the Soviet Union. Many stories were based on traditional European folklore, particularly those associated with the Brothers Grimm.

Films were broadcast between 1 October 1964 and 22 May 1969, with several films repeated during that sequence. A few were rebroadcast on their own in the 1970s.

== Format ==
Each instalment typically consisted of a serialised or self-contained story, often divided into multiple weekly parts. The films were broadcast in instalments (typically 2–4 parts) introduced by Peggy Miller, and either dubbed into English, or with English narration over the original soundtrack, leaving the foreign-language dialogue audible. The programmes were typically broadcast on Thursday afternoons around 17:25, following Blue Peter.

== International context and legacy ==
During the 1960s, imported programming was relatively rare, particularly from Eastern Bloc countries. The strand exposed British audiences to a wide range of storytelling traditions and visual styles, and demonstrated the BBC's willingness to experiment with non-domestic content to supplement its children's output. The use of dubbed or audible foreign dialogue and unfamiliar cultural settings contributed to a unique viewing experience compared to domestically- or American-produced children's programmes of the period.

Although relatively obscure compared to flagship programmes, Tales from Europe retains a cult following among viewers who recall its distinctive storytelling style. In particular, The Singing Ringing Tree became widely remembered for its surreal imagery and has been described as both memorable and unsettling for viewers. Marina Warner observes that:

The Singing, Ringing Tree seems strangely more relevant now than it did 10 years ago … Harry Potter and The Lord of the Rings film have brought the idea of fantasy with a strong moral message back into the mainstream. And somehow the East German state pedagogy, for all its risible earnestness, managed to do this in a way which is more idyllic, more heart-warming than these blockbuster films with all their merchandising.

Warner also contrasts the dubbed, live-action films of Tales from Europe with the "Americanised" Disney model; she emphasises their surreal, often frightening visual style as being more "truthful" to the original spirit of the tales. Edward Barnes comments, "It wasn't anti-Americanism as such, but there was a desire to see that children got as wide a cultural diet as possible."

John Callow, in an analysis of DEFA's East German fairy tale films, comments:

… the BBC's Tales from Europe managed to circumvent and transcend the suspicions and stereotypes fostered by the Cold War … Tales from Europe succeeded in embedding a vision of the European folk tale within British cultural life that, for almost two decades, had the power to challenge and supersede the pervasive commercialisation and cloying Disneyfication of the genre.

Marina Warner concludes:

Fairy tales have enduring themes. [The Singing Ringing Tree] shows a world where kindness and mutual endeavour triumph over pride and selfishness. These are things that children want. Even British children haven't had that mobile-phoned out of them quite yet.

== Preservation status ==
Like much BBC programming of the 1960s, many of the BBC's original broadcasts of Tales from Europe are believed to be missing due to archival wiping practices. However, the underlying films, having been produced independently by European studios, often survive in their original forms. In some cases, these films have been restored and released separately on home media.

== Media ==
Two of the best-known films in the strand, The Singing Ringing Tree and The Tinderbox, were released on DVD by Network Videos in 2011, packaged together under the title Tales from Europe.

== Episode list ==
No complete official episode list survives. However, the BBC's Programme Index, sourced from Radio Times listings, indicates the following:

List of Tales from Europe episodes
Tale	Part	Original UK broadcast date	Film country of origin	Narrator	Notes
The Tinderbox	1	1 October 1964	(East) Germany	Leigh Crutchley	Repeated in April/May 1966
The Tinderbox	2	8 October 1964	(East) Germany	Leigh Crutchley	Repeated in April/May 1966
The Tinderbox	3	15 October 1964	(East) Germany	Leigh Crutchley	Repeated in April/May 1966
Heidi	1	22 October 1964	Switzerland	Gary Watson	Repeated in January 1966
Heidi	2	29 October 1964	Switzerland	Gary Watson	Repeated in January 1966
Heidi	3	5 November 1964	Switzerland	Gary Watson	Repeated in January 1966
Heidi	4	12 November 1964	Switzerland	Gary Watson	Repeated in January 1966
The Singing Ringing Tree	1	19 November 1964	(East) Germany	Antony Bilbow	Repeated in March 1966
The Singing Ringing Tree	2	26 November 1964	(East) Germany	Antony Bilbow	Repeated in March 1966
The Singing Ringing Tree	3	3 December 1964	(East) Germany	Antony Bilbow	Repeated in March 1966
The Boy and the Pelican	1	10 December 1964	Russia (Soviet Union)	Frank Duncan	Repeated in May 1966
The Boy and the Pelican	2	17 December 1964	Russia (Soviet Union)	Frank Duncan	Repeated in May 1966
The Boy Who Loved Horses	1	31 December 1964	Denmark	English version by De Lane Lea Processes	
The Boy Who Loved Horses	2	7 January 1965	Denmark	English version by De Lane Lea Processes	
The Boy Who Loved Horses	3	14 January 1965	Denmark	English version by De Lane Lea Processes	
Paw	1	21 January 1965	Denmark		Repeated in February/March 1967
Paw	2	28 January 1965	Denmark		Repeated in February/March 1967
Paw	3	4 February 1965	Denmark		Repeated in February/March 1967
Paw	4	11 February 1965	Denmark		Repeated in February/March 1967
The Daughter of the Sun		18 February 1965	Russia (Soviet Union)	Wensley Pithey	
White Feather		8 April 1965	Poland	John Westbrook	
The Scouts and the Motor Car	1	15 April 1965	Poland	Peter Hawkins	Repeated in June 1966
The Scouts and the Motor Car	2	22 April 1965	Poland	Peter Hawkins	Repeated in June 1966
The Last Passenger	1	29 April 1965	Netherlands	Antony Bilbow	Repeated in July 1966
The Last Passenger	2	6 May 1965	Netherlands	Antony Bilbow	Repeated in July 1966
The Last Passenger	3	13 May 1965	Netherlands	Antony Bilbow	Repeated in July 1966
Noggin and the Omruds	1	17 June 1965	UK	Ronnie Stevens and Oliver Postgate	Part of the Noggin the Nog series
Noggin and the Omruds	2	24 June 1965	UK	Ronnie Stevens and Oliver Postgate	Part of the Noggin the Nog series
Pan		1 July 1965	Netherlands		
The Yellow Slippers	1	8 July 1965	Poland	English version by De Lane Lea Processes	
The Yellow Slippers	2	15 July 1965	Poland	English version by De Lane Lea Processes	
The Yellow Slippers	3	22 July 1965	Poland	English version by De Lane Lea Processes	
White Feather		23 September 1965	Poland	John Westbrook	
We Want a Dog	1	30 September 1965	Czechoslovakia	Gary Watson	Repeated in June 1966
We Want a Dog	2	7 October 1965	Czechoslovakia	Gary Watson	Repeated in June 1966
We Want a Dog	3	14 October 1965	Czechoslovakia	Gary Watson	Repeated in June 1966
The Boys Who Stole the Moon	1	21 October 1965	Poland	Antony Bilbow	Repeated in March/April 1968
The Boys Who Stole the Moon	2	28 October 1965	Poland	Antony Bilbow	Repeated in March/April 1968
The Boys Who Stole the Moon	3	4 November 1965	Poland	Antony Bilbow	Repeated in March/April 1968
Adventure in Golden Creek	1	11 November 1965	Czechoslovakia	Gary Watson	Repeated in October 1966
Adventure in Golden Creek	2	18 November 1965	Czechoslovakia	Gary Watson	Repeated in October 1966
They've Stolen the Sea		25 November 1965	France	John Westbrook	Repeated in March 1967
Snow White and the Seven Dwarfs	1	2 December 1965	(East) Germany	John Rees	
Snow White and the Seven Dwarfs	2	9 December 1965	(East) Germany	John Rees	
The Proud Princess	1	16 December 1965	Czechoslovakia	Leigh Crutchley	Repeated in July/August 1967
The Proud Princess	2	23 December 1965	Czechoslovakia	Leigh Crutchley	Repeated in July/August 1967
The Proud Princess	3	30 December 1965	Czechoslovakia	Leigh Crutchley	Repeated in July/August 1967
Heidi	1	6 January 1966	Switzerland	Gary Watson	Repeated from October/November 1964
Heidi	2	13 January 1966	Switzerland	Gary Watson	Repeated from October/November 1964
Heidi	3	20 January 1966	Switzerland	Gary Watson	Repeated from October/November 1964
Heidi	4	27 January 1966	Switzerland	Gary Watson	Repeated from October/November 1964
The Princess with the Golden Star	1	3 February 1966	Czechoslovakia	John Westbrook	Repeated in January 1967
The Princess with the Golden Star	2	10 February 1966	Czechoslovakia	John Westbrook	Repeated in January 1967
The Limping Boy		17 February 1966	Hungary	Gordon Clyde	Repeated in July 1967
The Secret of the Grey Gull	1	24 February 1966	Yugoslavia	Antony Bilbow	Repeated in November/December 1966
The Secret of the Grey Gull	2	3 March 1966	Yugoslavia	Antony Bilbow	Repeated in November/December 1966
The Secret of the Grey Gull	3	10 March 1966	Yugoslavia	Antony Bilbow	Repeated in November/December 1966
The Singing Ringing Tree	1	17 March 1966	(East) Germany	Antony Bilbow	Repeated from November/December 1964
The Singing Ringing Tree	2	24 March 1966	(East) Germany	Antony Bilbow	Repeated from November/December 1964
The Singing Ringing Tree	3	31 March 1966	(East) Germany	Antony Bilbow	Repeated from November/December 1964
Crooks' Island	1	7 April 1966	Poland	Peter Hawkins	
Crooks' Island	2	14 April 1966	Poland	Peter Hawkins	
Crooks' Island	3	21 April 1966	Poland	Peter Hawkins	
The Tinderbox	1	28 April 1966	(East) Germany	Leigh Crutchley	Repeated from October 1964
The Tinderbox	2	5 May 1966	(East) Germany	Leigh Crutchley	Repeated from October 1964
The Tinderbox	3	12 May 1966	(East) Germany	Leigh Crutchley	Repeated from October 1964
The Boy and the Pelican	1	19 May 1966	Russia (Soviet Union)	Frank Duncan	Repeated from December 1964
The Boy and the Pelican	2	26 May 1966	Russia (Soviet Union)	Frank Duncan	Repeated from December 1964
We Want a Dog	1	2 June 1966	Czechoslovakia	Gary Watson	Repeated from September/October 1965
We Want a Dog	2	9 June 1966	Czechoslovakia	Gary Watson	Repeated from September/October 1965
We Want a Dog	3	16 June 1966	Czechoslovakia	Gary Watson	Repeated from September/October 1965
The Scouts and the Motor Car	1	23 June 1966	Poland	Peter Hawkins	Repeated from April 1965
The Scouts and the Motor Car	2	30 June 1966	Poland	Peter Hawkins	Repeated from April 1965
The Last Passenger	1	7 July 1966	Netherlands	Antony Bilbow	Repeated from April/May 1965
The Last Passenger	2	14 July 1966	Netherlands	Antony Bilbow	Repeated from April/May 1965
The Last Passenger	3	21 July 1966	Netherlands	Antony Bilbow	Repeated from April/May 1965
Glamador	1	22 September 1966	France	Gary Watson	Repeated in April 1967
Glamador	2	29 September 1966	France	Gary Watson	Repeated in April 1967
Adventure in Golden Creek	1	6 October 1966	Czechoslovakia	Gary Watson	Repeated from November 1965
Adventure in Golden Creek	2	13 October 1966	Czechoslovakia	Gary Watson	Repeated from November 1965
Summer at Salty Creek	1	20 October 1966	Sweden	Gordon Clyde	Repeated in June/July 1967
Summer at Salty Creek	2	27 October 1966	Sweden	Gordon Clyde	Repeated in June/July 1967
Summer at Salty Creek	3	3 November 1966	Sweden	Gordon Clyde	Repeated in June/July 1967
The Golden Goose	1	10 November 1966	(East) Germany	Leigh Crutchley	Repeated in May 1967
The Golden Goose	2	17 November 1966	(East) Germany	Leigh Crutchley	Repeated in May 1967
The Secret of the Grey Gull	1	24 November 1966	Yugoslavia	Antony Bilbow	Repeated from February/March 1966
The Secret of the Grey Gull	2	1 December 1966	Yugoslavia	Antony Bilbow	Repeated from February/March 1966
The Secret of the Grey Gull	3	18 December 1966	Yugoslavia	Antony Bilbow	Repeated from February/March 1966
Rumpelstiltskin	1	15 December 1966	(East) Germany		Repeated in September 1967
Rumpelstiltskin	2	22 December 1966	(East) Germany		Repeated in September 1967
Two Boys and a Pigeon		29 December 1966	Norway	James Langham	Repeated in December 1967
The Princess with the Golden Star	1	5 January 1967	Czechoslovakia	John Westbrook	Repeated from February 1966
The Princess with the Golden Star	2	12 January 1967	Czechoslovakia	John Westbrook	Repeated from February 1966
Maximka	1	19 January 1967	Russia (Soviet Union)	Wensley Pithey	Repeated in November 1967
Maximka	2	26 January 1967	Russia (Soviet Union)	Wensley Pithey	Repeated in November 1967
Maximka	3	2 February 1967	Russia (Soviet Union)	Wensley Pithey	Repeated in November 1967
Paw	1	9 February 1967	Denmark		Repeated from January/February 1965
Paw	2	16 February 1967	Denmark		Repeated from January/February 1965
Paw	3	23 February 1967	Denmark		Repeated from January/February 1965
Paw	4	2 March 1967	Denmark		Repeated from January/February 1965
The City of Craftsmen	1	9 March 1967	Russia (Soviet Union)	Gary Watson	Repeated in February 1968
The City of Craftsmen	2	16 March 1967	Russia (Soviet Union)	Gary Watson	Repeated in February 1968
The City of Craftsmen	3	23 March 1967	Russia (Soviet Union)	Gary Watson	Repeated in February 1968
They've Stolen the Sea		30 March 1967	France	John Westbrook	Repeated from November 1965
Glamador	1	6 April 1967	France	Gary Watson	Repeated from September 1966
Glamador	2	13 April 1967	France	Gary Watson	Repeated from September 1966
The Musical Powder Box	1	20 April 1967	Czechoslovakia	John Westbrook	Repeated in October 1967
The Musical Powder Box	2	27 April 1967	Czechoslovakia	John Westbrook	Repeated in October 1967
The Musical Powder Box	3	4 May 1967	Czechoslovakia	John Westbrook	Repeated in October 1967
The Golden Goose	1	11 May 1967	(East) Germany	Leigh Crutchley	Repeated from November 1966
The Golden Goose	2	18 May 1967	(East) Germany	Leigh Crutchley	Repeated from November 1966
Katya and the Crocodile	1	1 June 1967	Czechoslovakia	Antony Bilbow	Repeated in October/November 1968
Katya and the Crocodile	2	8 June 1967	Czechoslovakia	Antony Bilbow	Repeated in October/November 1968
Katya and the Crocodile	3	15 June 1967	Czechoslovakia	Antony Bilbow	Repeated in October/November 1968
Summer at Salty Creek	1	22 June 1967	Sweden	Gordon Clyde	Repeated from October/November 1966
Summer at Salty Creek	2	29 June 1967	Sweden	Gordon Clyde	Repeated from October/November 1966
Summer at Salty Creek	3	6 July 1967	Sweden	Gordon Clyde	Repeated from October/November 1966
The Limping Boy		13 July 1967	Hungary	Gordon Clyde	Repeated from February 1966
The Proud Princess	1	20 July 1967	Czechoslovakia	Leigh Crutchley	Repeated from December 1965
The Proud Princess	2	27 July 1967	Czechoslovakia	Leigh Crutchley	Repeated from December 1965
The Proud Princess	3	3 August 1967	Czechoslovakia	Leigh Crutchley	Repeated from December 1965
The Ark	1	10 August 1967	Sweden	John Westbrook	Repeated in June/July 1968
The Ark	2	17 August 1967	Sweden	John Westbrook	Repeated in June/July 1968
The Ark	3	24 August 1967	Sweden	John Westbrook	Repeated in June/July 1968
The Ark	4	31 August 1967	Sweden	John Westbrook	Repeated in June/July 1968
Rumpelstiltskin	1	7 September 1967	(East) Germany		Repeated from December 1966
Rumpelstiltskin	2	14 September 1967	(East) Germany		Repeated from December 1966
The Golden Tent	1	21 September 1967	Mongolia (/East Germany)	Leigh Crutchley	
The Golden Tent	2	28 September 1967	Mongolia (/East Germany)	Leigh Crutchley	
The Golden Tent	3	5 October 1967	Mongolia (/East Germany)	Leigh Crutchley	
The Musical Powder Box	1	12 October 1967	Czechoslovakia	John Westbrook	Repeated from April/May 1967
The Musical Powder Box	2	19 October 1967	Czechoslovakia	John Westbrook	Repeated from April/May 1967
The Musical Powder Box	3	26 October 1967	Czechoslovakia	John Westbrook	Repeated from April/May 1967
The Millionaire	1	2 November 1967	Poland	Gordon Clyde	
The Millionaire	2	9 November 1967	Poland	Gordon Clyde	
Maximka	1	16 November 1967	Russia (Soviet Union)	Wensley Pithey	Repeated from January/February 19677
Maximka	2	23 November 1967	Russia (Soviet Union)	Wensley Pithey	Repeated from January/February 19677
Maximka	3	30 November 1967	Russia (Soviet Union)	Wensley Pithey	Repeated from January/February 19677
Two Boys and a Pigeon		7 December 1967	Norway	James Langham	Repeated from December 1966
Almost a Fairytale	1	14 December 1967	Russia (Soviet Union)		A Sovexport film
Almost a Fairytale	2	21 December 1967	Russia (Soviet Union)		A Sovexport film
Almost a Fairytale	3	28 December 1967	Russia (Soviet Union)		A Sovexport film
On the Twelfth Day		4 January 1968	UK		A ballet on film
The Adventures of Barbara	1	11 January 1968	Poland	Gary Watson	
The Adventures of Barbara	2	18 January 1968	Poland	Gary Watson	
The Adventures of Barbara	3	25 January 1968	Poland	Gary Watson	
The Adventures of Barbara	4	1 February 1968	Poland	Gary Watson	
The City of Craftsmen	1	8 February 1968	Russia (Soviet Union)	Gary Watson	Repeated from March 1967
The City of Craftsmen	2	15 February 1968	Russia (Soviet Union)	Gary Watson	Repeated from March 1967
The City of Craftsmen	3	22 February 1968	Russia (Soviet Union)	Gary Watson	Repeated from March 1967
Here Comes Peter	1	29 February 1968	Sweden	Antony Bilbow	
Here Comes Peter	2	7 March 1968	Sweden	Antony Bilbow	
Here Comes Peter	3	14 March 1968	Sweden	Antony Bilbow	
The Boys Who Stole the Moon	1	21 March 1968	Poland	Antony Bilbow	Repeated from October/November 1965
The Boys Who Stole the Moon	2	28 March 1968	Poland	Antony Bilbow	Repeated from October/November 1965
The Boys Who Stole the Moon	3	4 April 1968	Poland	Antony Bilbow	Repeated from October/November 1965
Here Comes Peter		11 April 1968	Sweden	Antony Bilbow	Continuing the story of Peter
Here Comes Peter		18 April 1968	Sweden	Antony Bilbow	Continuing the story of Peter
Here Comes Peter		25 April 1968	Sweden	Antony Bilbow	Continuing the story of Peter
Mario	1	2 May 1968	Austria	John Westbrook	
Mario	2	9 May 1968	Austria	John Westbrook	
Mario	3	16 May 1968	Austria	John Westbrook	
Mario	4	23 May 1968	Austria	John Westbrook	
Here Comes Peter		20 June 1968	Sweden	Antony Bilbow	Continuing the story of Peter
The Ark	1	27 June 1968	Sweden	John Westbrook	Repeated from August 1967
The Ark	2	4 July 1968	Sweden	John Westbrook	Repeated from August 1967
The Ark	3	11 July 1968	Sweden	John Westbrook	Repeated from August 1967
The Ark	4	18 July 1968	Sweden	John Westbrook	Repeated from August 1967
The Windmill	1	26 September 1968	Bulgaria	Wensley Pithey	
The Windmill	2	3 October 1968	Bulgaria	Wensley Pithey	
The Windmill	3	10 October 1968	Bulgaria	Wensley Pithey	
Katya and the Crocodile	1	24 October 1968	Czechoslovakia	Antony Bilbow	Repeated from June 1967
Katya and the Crocodile	2	31 October 1968	Czechoslovakia	Antony Bilbow	Repeated from June 1967
Katya and the Crocodile	3	7 November 1968	Czechoslovakia	Antony Bilbow	Repeated from June 1967
Mario	1	14 November 1968	Austria	John Westbrook	
Mario	2	21 November 1968	Austria	John Westbrook	
Mario	3	28 November 1968	Austria	John Westbrook	
The Snow Queen	1	5 December 1968	Russia (Soviet Union)	Gary Watson	
The Snow Queen	2	12 December 1968	Russia (Soviet Union)	Gary Watson	
The Snow Queen	3	19 December 1968	Russia (Soviet Union)	Gary Watson	
Mario		16 January 1969	Austria	John Westbrook	
The Windsor Box		23 January 1969	UK	Duncan Carse	
The Happy Age	1	20 February 1969	France	Gabriel Woolf	
The Happy Age	2	27 February 1969	France	Gabriel Woolf	
The Happy Age	3	6 March 1969	France	Gabriel Woolf	
The Happy Age	4	13 March 1969	France	Gabriel Woolf	
The Village Matadors		3 April 1969	Russia (Soviet Union)	Gilbert Wynne	
The Mystery of the Cave	1	10 April 1969	Sweden	John Westbrook	
The Mystery of the Cave	2	17 April 1969	Sweden	John Westbrook	
The Mystery of the Cave	3	24 April 1969	Sweden	John Westbrook	
The Mystery of the Cave	4	1 May 1969	Sweden	John Westbrook	
The Mystery of the Cave	5	8 May 1969	Sweden	John Westbrook	
The Mystery of the Cave	6	15 May 1969	Sweden	John Westbrook	
The Mystery of the Cave	7	22 May 1969	Sweden	John Westbrook	

== See also ==
- The Adventures of Robinson Crusoe
- Belle and Sebastian
- Blue Peter
- The Flashing Blade
- The Singing Ringing Tree
- The Tinderbox
- The White Horses
