= 2703 =

2703 may refer to:

- 2703 Rodari asteroid
- Hirth 2703 two stroke aircraft engine
- IBM 2703 non-programmable communications controller
- The year in the 28th century
