= Cipollino =

Fictional character

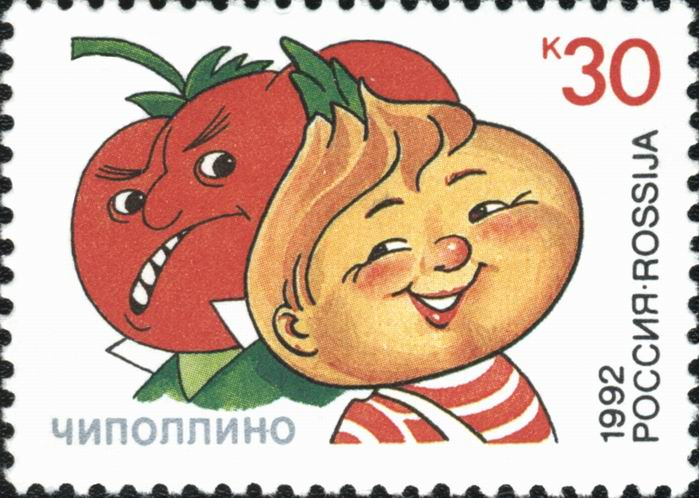
Signor Tomato and Cipollino on a 1992 Russian stamp.

Cipollino (pronounced [tʃipolˈliːno]), or Little Onion as translated from the original, is a fictional character from Gianni Rodari's eponymous Tale of Cipollino (Italian: Il romanzo di Cipollino) written in 1951. Also known under its 1957 renamed title Adventures of Cipollino (Italian: Le avventure di Cipollino), it is a children's tale about political oppression. He also appeared before the publication of the book in the children's magazine Il Pioniere of which Rodari was the editor. Cipollino was popular in the Soviet Union, up to the point of being adapted as a ballet composed by Karen Khachaturian and choreographed by Henrich Mayorov, originally staged in Taras Shevchenko National Opera and Ballet Theatre of Ukraine on November 8, 1974.

In a world inhabited by anthropomorphic produce, Cipollino fights the unjust treatment of his fellow vegetable townsfolk by the fruit royalty (Prince Lemon and the overly proud Lord Tomato) in the garden kingdom. The main theme is the struggle of the underclass against the powerful, good versus evil, and the importance of friendship in the face of difficulties.

== Adaptations ==
- Chipollinos tavgadasavali, a Georgian TV film
- Cipollino, a 1961 Soyuzmultfilm film directed by Boris Dyozhkin, and then re-released in 1993 by Film Roman. The English version features characters played by Canadian voice actors.
- Chipollino, a 1972 Soviet film directed by Tamara Lisitsian

== Voices in the 1961 Soviet cartoon ==
=== Russian ===
- Nina Gulyayeva as Cipollino
- Sergey Martinson as Prince Lemon
- Vladimir Lepko as Cipollone
- Aleksey Polevoy as Godfather Pumpkin
- Grigory Shpigel as Lord Tomato
- Vera Orlova as Radish
- Irina Pototskaya as Count Cherry
- Yelena Ponsova as Countesses Cherries
- Georgy Millyar as Mister Carrot
- Georgy Vitsin as Cactus
- Yuri Khrzhanovsky as Lemon soldiers, Uncle Grape, street gossipers, Professor Pear, Uncle Blueberry, Dog Pylesosik (lit. vacuum cleaner), prison warden

=== English ===
- Kathleen Barr
- Lynda Boyd
- Paul Dobson
- Doc Harris
- David Kaye
- Terry Klassen
- Campbell Lane
- Scott McNeil
- Cathy Weseluck
- Dale Wilson

== See also ==
- Gianni Rodari's works
