= Hurlyburly (disambiguation) =

Hurlyburly is a 1984 dark comedy play by David Rabe.

Hurlyburly and orthographically similar terms may also refer to:

- Hurlyburly (film), 1998 film adaptation of the play
- Hurly Burly, a burlesque dance troupe formed by Miss Polly Rae
- "Hurly Burly", b-side of "Spending All My Time" by the Japanese girl group Perfume
- Hurly-Burly (journal), a psychoanalysis journal
- Hurley Burley, an American racehorse
- "Hurleburlebutz", German title of "The Dwarf, the Fox and the Princess", a fairy tale appearing as the 66th tale in Grimms' Fairy Tales (1843)
