= Duped Till Doomsday =

1957 film

- Directed by: Kurt Jung-Alsen
- Written by: Franz Fühmann; Kurt Bortfeldt; Willi Brückner
- Produced by: Adolf Fischer
- Starring: Rudolf Ulrich
- Cinematography: Walter Fehdmer
- Edited by: Wally Gurschke
- Music by: Günter Klück
- Distributed by: Progress Film
- Release date: 7 March 1957
- Running time: 97 minutes
- Country: East Germany
- Language: German

Duped Till Doomsday (German: Betrogen bis zum jüngsten Tag) is a 1957 East German drama film directed by Kurt Jung-Alsen. It was entered into the 1957 Cannes Film Festival.

== Plot ==
Soldiers Wagner, Paulun and Lick are three friends and the best sharpshooters in a division stationed in Latvia, near the German-Soviet border. During June 1941, while on leave, they take a walk near a river and spot movement in a bush. Believing it to be a bird, they shoot in its direction, only to discover that they have killed Angelika, their captain's daughter. The three dump her corpse in a swamp and proceed as if nothing happened.

Lick relates the incident to his father, a Waffen-SS general, who decides to use the corpse for propaganda purposes: on 22 June, the day of the invasion of the Soviet Union, he exhumes Angelika's remains and claims she was killed by Soviet marauders. Her father orders to shoot a number of Latvian women in retaliation.

Paulun tries to tell the truth, but Lick claims he is insane; Wagner remains silent. When Paulun tries to escape arrest, he is killed by Lick. Wagner does nothing and continues to behave as usual.

== Cast ==
- Rudolf Ulrich as Wagner
- Wolfgang Kieling as Lick
- Hans-Joachim Martens as Paulun
- Walther Süssenguth as captain
- Renate Küster as Angelika
- Peter Kiwitt as Waffen-SS General Lick
- Hermann Dieckhoff as division commander
- Kurt Ulrich as lieutenant
- Erich Brauer as staff sergeant
- Hannes Fischer as kitchen sergeant
- Wolfgang Lippert as Voss
- Helga Raumer as innkeeper's daughter
- Fritz Diez as Adolf Hitler (voice)
- Horst Giese as uncredited role

== Production ==
The script was adapted from the 1955-published novel Kameraden by Franz Fühmann. Fühmann himself was excluded from participating in the production. The picture was the first of the "army epics", a new East German genre that reformed the classic German style of portraying military comradeship, replacing the typical tales of military friendship with plots centered on moral dilemmas facing the servicemen. In addition, the picture was intended as a response to the war films produced in the West at those years.

== Reception ==
Betrogen bis zum jüngsten Tag was the first East German film to be entered into the Cannes Film Festival; a year earlier, at 1956, Zar und Zimmermann and Der Teufelskreis were screened outside the competition. Although the picture had no chance of winning due to political considerations, it was nominated for the Palme d'Or.

The film was DEFA's most successful project since the 1946 Murderers Among Us. It was well received abroad. The Punch magazine's reviewer wrote that it was "very worth seeing... mostly admirable, flowed in the end." The East German media called it "the first DEFA war film" and praised it. Fühmann's work received considerable attention due to the film, and his books were re-printed.
