= Katerina Izmailova =

Katerina Izmailova' may refer to

- Lady Macbeth of the Mtsensk District (opera), opera by Dmitri Shostakovich, retitled for revised version in 1962
- Katerina Izmailova (film), a 1966 Soviet film adaptation of Lady Macbeth of the Mtsensk District
- Katerina Izmailova (swimmer) (born 1977), Tajikistani swimmer
