= The Dwarf, the Fox and the Princess =

Fairy tale by Brothers Grimm

"The Dwarf, the Fox and the Princess" (German: Hurleburlebutz, literal translation: "impulsively sworn promise"; ATU Index 425A) is a fairy tale. It appears as the 66th tale in the Grimms' Fairy Tales (Children's and Household Tales) of the Brothers Grimm published in 1843.

== Story (Hurleburlebutz version) ==
A king is lost in the forest and comes across a munchkin (a dwarf). In exchange for being led out of the forest, the king promises the hand of his youngest and favourite daughter in marriage to the munchkin. The dwarf delivers the king safely back to his castle and informs him that he will be back in a week for the king's daughter.

The royal family is unhappy with the arrangement, and the king's other daughters, informed of his obligation, promise to get rid of the munchkin. A week later, a fox comes to the castle and, the daughters having persuaded an unsuspecting cowherd's daughter to be dressed up in royal clothes, send her out with the fox into the forest. The fox orders the cowherd's daughter to "sit down on my furry tail, Hurleburlebutz!" and then orders her to pick the fleas out of his fur, which she readily agrees to. The fox realises it is not the princess and sends her back.

The next week, the fox comes back and is sent off with the gooseherd's daughter. In the forest, the fox again orders a delousing by the cowherd's daughter to which she agrees, and she is then sent back.

The third week, the fox returns and the king sends his youngest daughter into the forest with the fox. When he demands a delousing, she expresses her dismay: "I'm a king's daughter and yet I must delouse a fox!" The fox knows he has the right bride, and he transforms back into his munchkin form, and then lives for a few years with the princess in his hut.

One day, having to go away, he predicts to the daughter that three doves will soon come flying in. He orders that when swoop to the ground she must catch the middle dove, and then immediately cut off its head. She does as he says, and the munchkin reappears as a handsome prince. He explains to her that he was a prince who was cursed by a fairy and turned into the munchkin, but the princess has restored him. Later, they inherit the princess father's kingdom.

== Sources ==
The tale Hurleburlebutz was first provided to the Brothers Grimm by teller Jeanette Hassenpflug. It later appears only in the note to the similar fairy tale The Iron Stove, the 127th in the collection.

== Analysis ==
=== Tale type ===
The tale belongs to the international cycle of the Animal as Bridegroom or The Search for the Lost Husband, which corresponds to tale type ATU 425 of the international Aarne-Thompson-Uther Index. American folklorist D. L. Ashliman classified the tale as type 425A, "The Monster (Animal) as Bridegroom".

=== Motifs ===
The fox also appears in the 57th tale of the Grimm Brothers' compilation, The Golden Bird.

== Publications ==
In some editions of Children's and Household Tales, this fairy tale, as well as other fairy tales that are no longer published, can be found in the appendix. See Ludwig Bechstein's The White Wolf.

The fairy tale has been broadcast several times as a radio play (audio book) in a performance by the Detmold theatre ensemble.

== Media adaptations ==
- The very loose East German film adaptation The Singing Ringing Tree (1957), produced and distributed by DEFA, was theatrically released in East Germany on 13 December 1957, then theatrically released in West Germany on 14 September 1958, seen by almost 6 million viewers. In 1964, the film was broadcast on British television on BBC 1 on 19 November as part of the Tales from Europe strand as a three part miniseries with an English-language commentary, broadcast in reruns until 1980, attaining a cult status. It was first broadcast on East German television broadcaster DFF 1 on 2 July 1977, and then on West German television on 3 January 1988 on West 3. It was released on VHS cassette tape in 1998.
- In 2013, a live stage production adaptation of the fairy tale debuted in Dresden.
- A 2016 remake of the 1957 film directed by Wolfgang Eißler was released with Hamburg actress Jytte-Merle Böhrnsen as the princess, with Christel Bodenstein who played the princess role of the 1957 film, making a cameo as a herbalist. It was featured in the 9th season of German TV broadcaster ARD series Six in One Go.
