= Before the Lightning Strikes =

1959 film

Bevor der Blitz einschlägt
- Directed by: Richard Groschopp
- Written by: Carl Andrießen; Lothar Creutz; Richard Groschopp
- Produced by: Willi Teichmann
- Starring: Christine Laszar
- Cinematography: Eugen Klagemann, Karl Drömmer
- Edited by: Helga Emmrich
- Music by: Hans Hendrik Wehding
- Production company: DEFA
- Distributed by: Progress Film
- Release date: 4 October 1959
- Running time: 96 minutes
- Country: East Germany
- Language: German

Before the Lightning Strikes (German: Bevor der Blitz einschlägt) is an East German comedy film directed by Richard Groschopp. It was released in 1959.

== Plot ==
Heinz, an ambitious reporter of the Berlin am Morgen newspaper, had made a fatal error when he prepared an article about a locomotive's factory, confusing the successful and motivated Schneider Workers' Brigade with the negligent Schindler Brigade. He also presented the tyrannical manager as a paragon of virtue. Heinz's editor, Christine, decides to send him to the factory on another mission, and this time he should mingle with workers by joining them. Heinz, who takes the new assignment with little enthusiasm, becomes a highly motivated laborer and even manages to influence the Brigades' members to stop quarrelling. He also helps the manager to reconnect with his subordinates. Heinz's second article is welcomed as brilliant.

== Cast ==
- Christine Laszar as Christine Koch
- Horst Drinda as Heinz Engelhardt
- Johannes Arpe as Paul Jordan
- Margret Homeyer as Otti Schütz
- Traute Sense as Claudia Lindner
- Werner Dissel as Sylvio O. Schmitt
- Herwart Grosse as Argus
- Hannes Fischer as Rudi Molle
- Heinz Schröder as Bruno Brause
- Gerd Biewer as Pfefferkorn
- Rudi Schiemann as butcher
- Friedrich Richter as entomologist
- Annemarie Hase as Aunt Else
- Rolf Herricht as locomotive constructor
- Hannjo Hasse as Dr. Schwarz

== Production ==
Before the Lightning Strikes was part of a wave of light-hearted comedies released in the late 1950s to provide entertainment for the viewers, after the DEFA Board noticed the public's negative response to the ideological films made earlier in the decade. The picture still encountered several problems, and the DEFA Commission in the Socialist Unity Party of Germany's Politburo insisted on it featuring "contemporary socialist issues." It had to be completely revised before it was approved for screening. It was the third in a series of four comedies made in collaboration between director Richard Groschopp and writers Lothar Creutz and Carl Andriessen, who also worked on Sie kannten sich alle (1958) Ware für Katalonien (1959) and Die Liebe und der Co-Pilot (1960).

== Reception ==
The West German Catholic Film Service described the film as "combining entertainment with contemporary issues, made in a cabaret style." Dieter Reimer called it "a witty comedy."
