= Chipollino (film) =

- Directed by: Tamara Lisitsian
- Written by: Felix Krivin (dialogue); Tamara Lisitsian(dialogue and screenplay); Samuil Marshak (dialogue and screenplay); Gianni Rodari (novel and screenplay)
- Produced by: Valery Gandrabura
- Starring: Aleksandr Yelistratov; Vladimir Basov; Rina Zelyonaya
- Narrated by: Gianni Rodari
- Cinematography: Dmitri Korzhikhin
- Edited by: Olga Etenko
- Music by: Vladislav Kazenin
- Production company: Mosfilm
- Release date: 1972
- Country: Soviet Union
- Language: Russian

Chipollino (Russian: Чиполлино) is a 1972 Soviet musical comedy film directed by Tamara Lisitsian. The film is also known as Cipollino (International informal title and English / Italian title).

== Plot ==
In a village where the onion boy Chipollino lives, the townsfolk gather in the market square to welcome the visiting Prince Lemon. In the crowded square, Cipollino’s father, Cipollone, accidentally steps on the prince’s foot and is thrown into prison as a supposed rebel and troublemaker.

The steward of the Cherry Countesses, Señor Tomato, following his mistresses’ orders, evicts poor neighbor Uncle Pumpkin from his tiny home. Prince Lemon needs the land for a new military base, designed by foreign military advisor Mr. Carrot.

The Cherry Countesses issue a decree stating that villagers must now pay rent not only for their homes but also for the air they breathe, as well as for rain, snow, hail, and other forms of precipitation.

Cipollino urges the villagers to resist this injustice. With the help of the young Count Cherry and maid-servants Strawberry, the villagers seize an old castle, withstand the siege of Prince Lemon’s army, and soon drive out the oppressors, raising the banner of victory over their free village.

== Cast ==
- Gianni Rodari as Storyteller
- Aleksandr Yelistratov as Chipollino
- Vladimir Basov as Prince Lemon
- Rina Zelyonaya as Countess Cherry
- Aleksandra Panova as Countess Cherry
- Vitaly Kerdimun as Viscount Cherry
- Nadir Malishevsky as Lord Tomato before the earthquake
- Vladimir Belokurov as Lord Tomato after the earthquake
- Georgiy Vitsin as Lawyer Pea
- Roman Tkachuk as Mastino
- Aleksandr Kuznetsov as Chief of staff
- Georgi Georgiu as Patison
- Rudolf Rudin as Mr. Carotino
- Aleksei Smirnov as Cipollone
- Natalya Krachkovskaya as Cipolla
- Viktor Bajkov as Mr. Squash
- Yevgenia Melnikova as Mrs. Pumpkin
- Viktor Kolpakov as Master Raisin
- Anatoly Kubatsky as Aubergine
- Pavel Vinnik as Pear
- Maryana Smirnova as Strawberry
- Yekaterina Mojseyenko as Strawberry
- Yekaterina Semochkina as Radish
- Maria Vinogradova as town-dweller
