= The Book of Whys =

Children's picture book first published in 1984

- Cover of English translation
- Editor: Marcello Argilli (Italian 1st ed.)
- Author: Gianni Rodari
- Original title: Il libro dei perché
- Translator: Antony Shugaar (English 1st. ed)
- Illustrator: Emanuele Luzzati (Italian 1st ed.); JooHee Yoon (English 1st. ed)
- Language: Italian
- Genre: Picture book
- Publisher: Rome: Editori Riuniti (Italian 1st ed.); New York: Enchanted Lion Books (English 1st. ed)
- Publication date: 1984
- English publication date: 2024
- Pages: 156 p. (English 1st ed.)
- ISBN: 978-1-59270-364-7

The Book of Whys (Italian: Il libro dei perché) is a children's picture book by Italian children's writer and journalist Gianni Rodari. The work contains children's questions that were answered by Rodari in his weekly newspaper column in l'Unità from 1955 to 1958 and was first published in 1984.

Antony Shugaar's English translation was published by Enchanted Lion Books in 2024, among translations of Rodari's other works, which until then had little exposure to a U.S. audience.

== Content ==
The work contains children's questions that were answered by Rodari in his weekly newspaper column in l'Unità from 1955 to 1958. The work contains questions on a broad range of topics, such as "Which came first, the chicken or the egg?" and "Why do your eyes sting when you chop an onion?" In the English translation, the responses are augmented by JooHee Yoon's colored pencil illustrations in mid-century modern style, such as children and adults with diverse appearances.

== Critical reception ==
Kirkus Reviews found "[w]elcome insights from a celebrated author" in its review of the English-language translation; the reviewer praised the work of the illustrator, Yoon, whose "whimsical illustrations further enliven the text." Publishers Weekly wrote that The Book of Whys is a "simultaneously thought-provoking and laugh-out-loud work that tackles questions regarding flights of fancy and contemporary existence." The School Library Journal (SLJ), a publication for school librarians, found it to be a "decent purchase for libraries" and recommended it for older children; the reviewer found "part fact, part poem" in Rodari's answers and found the illustrations to be similarly "charmingly eccentric". SLJ noted that the use of "logic and illogic" in Rodari's questions has had comparisons to Lewis Carroll.

The author grew up during the reign of fascist dictator Benito Mussolini and resisted the regime, despite briefly joining the National Fascist Party to find work; Kirkus Reviews wrote that the witty answers given by Rodari reflect this outlook and his "pro-labor, anti-authoritarian" views. On how Rodari's activities in the Italian resistance factored into his writing, the translator Antony Shugaar said: "The core of Gianni Rodari's work with children is how to free the imagination. [...] His idea for children is to play with language and concepts in a way that allows freedom rather than indoctrination and mindless rule following." The Wall Street Journal critic wrote that Rodari had answered a range of questions with care to the "innocence and curiosity" of his readers and without "pandering or (mostly) showing his politics."
