= Einheitsempfänger =

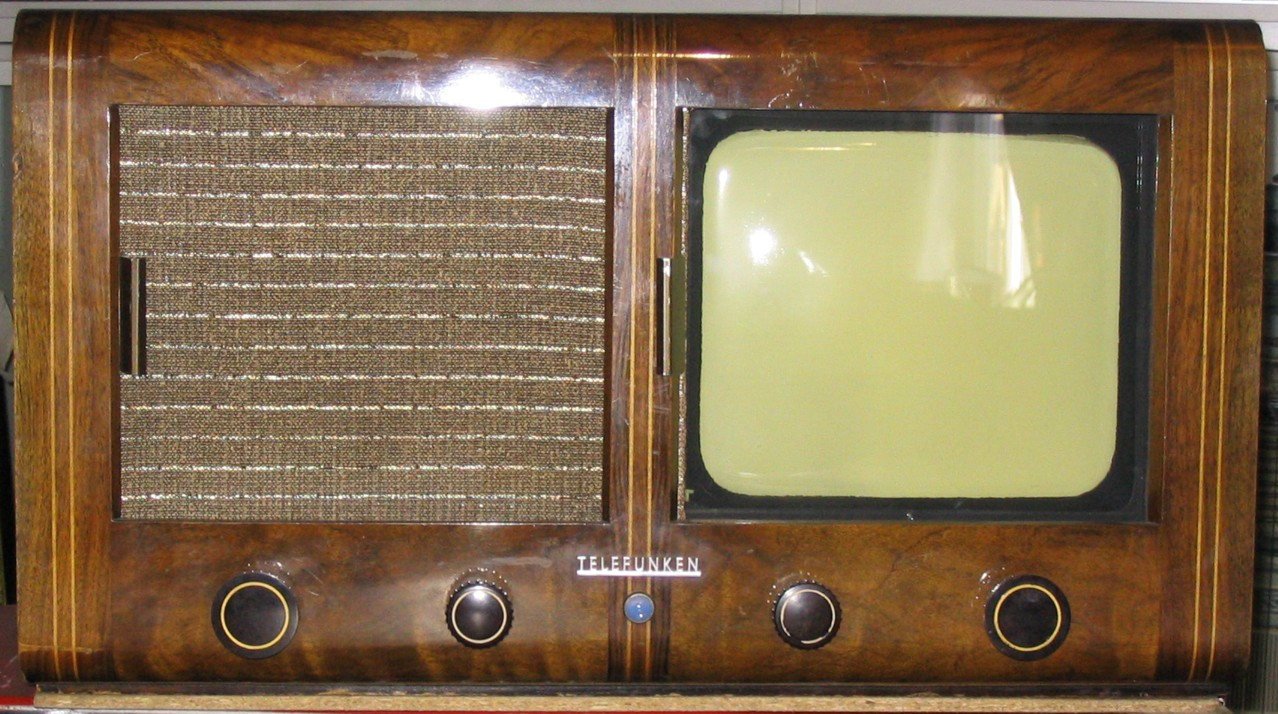
TV receiver E1 (1939)

In August 1939, Nazi Germany introduced the Einheits-Fernseh-Empfänger E1 (i.e. Unitary-TV-receiver E1), also called Volksfernseher (i.e. People's TV), a 441-line, 25 interlaced frames per second (or more correctly 50 fields per second) television system. The TV was presented to the public in the 16th International radio exhibition Berlin.

== History ==
The project started in 1938, associating the Reichspost and several companies, including Bosch, Blaupunkt, Loewe, Lorenz, TeKaDe and Telefunken. The objective was to produce 10,000 units, but the start of World War II caused only about 50 devices to be installed in military hospitals and various government departments. The Berlin transmitter was destroyed by Allied bombing in November 1943.

Like British televisions of the era, the Einheitsempfänger could receive only one channel with its frequency pre-tuned at the factory to reduce construction costs.

== Surviving sets ==
Only a few surviving and functioning units are known:

- Museum for Communication Berlin (Telefunken)
- Museum for Communication Berlin (Blaupunkt, incomplete)
- Museum of Communication in Frankfurt (Telefunken, with a new speaker, otherwise completely preserved)
- Private collection of August-Peter Nehrig (Telefunken, completely preserved)
- German Museum of Technology, Berlin (reproduction without original chassis and a new speaker fabric)
- University of Mittweida (Blaupunkt, with a new speaker material, condition unknown)
- Fuerth Radio Museum (original chassis with power transformer in the exhibition)
- Fuerth Radio Museum (functional, for demonstration)

== Technical data for a typical set ==
- Case dimensions (W×H×D): 65 cm × 37 cm × 38 cm
- Image size: 19.5 cm × 22.5 cm, 29 cm diagonal; aspect ratio 15:13 (approx 3.46:3)
- Power consumption: 185 W in television reception mode, 60 W in radio reception mode

== See also ==
- History of television in Germany
