= Franz Fühmann =

East German writer (1922–1984)

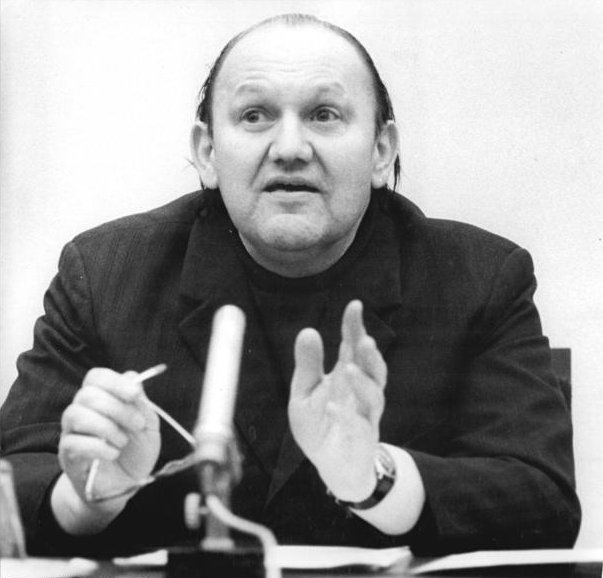
- Fühmann in 1973
- Born: 15 January 1922; Rochlitz an der Iser/ Rokytnice nad Jizerou, Czechoslovakia
- Died: 8 July 1984 (aged 62); East Berlin, East Germany
- Citizenship: East German
- Occupation: Writer
- Writing career
- Period: 1953–1984 (his death)
- Genres: Short stories, essays, children's literature
- Notable awards: Heinrich Mann Prize; 1956; National Prize of East Germany; 1957 and 1974; Deutscher Kritikerpreis; 1977; Geschwister-Scholl-Preis; 1982

Franz Fühmann (15 January 1922 – 8 July 1984) was a German writer who lived and worked in East Germany. He wrote in a variety of formats, including short stories, essays, screenplays and children's books. Influenced by Nazism in his youth, he later embraced (and renounced) socialism.

== Life ==
Fühmann was the son of an apothecary in Rochlitz an der Iser (Rokytnice nad Jizerou) in the Karkonosze in Czechoslovakia. After Volksschule he attended the Jesuitenkonvikt Kalksburg near Vienna for four years, leaving in 1936 to attend the gymnasium in Reichenberg (Liberec), northern Bohemia. Fühmann took his Abitur exams in Vrchlabí. After the annexation of the Sudetenland by Germany, he joined the Sturmabteilung.

Fühmann was drafted into the Wehrmacht in 1941, and was a communications soldier in Greece and the Soviet Union. He was captured by Soviet forces in 1945 and sent to a communist rehabilitation school in Noginsk, near Moscow.

Fühmann returned from Soviet captivity to East Germany, where he lived for the rest of his life in Märkisch Buchholz and Berlin. He joined the National Democratic Party of Germany, one of the bloc parties, was active until 1958 and resigned from the party in 1972.

From 1952 until his death, Fühmann was a freelance writer. He mentored young writers, and spoke for those under East German repression. In 1976, Fühmann was among the first to sign a letter protesting the exile of Wolf Biermann. He received the 1956 Heinrich Mann Prize, the 1957 and 1974 National Prize of East Germany, the 1977 German Critics' Award and the 1982 Geschwister-Scholl-Preis, and was a member of the Academy of Arts, Berlin.

== Work ==
Fühmann's work includes poems, translations of Czech and Hungarian poems, books for children and young adults, essays, stories, a ballet (Kirke und Odysseus) and a collaboration with a photographer (Was für eine Insel in was für einem Meer) about the developmentally disabled. He also compiled a volume of poems by rearranging parts of a rhyming dictionary and furnishing it with headings.

Works for children and young people were important to Fühmann throughout his life, and he published his first children's book at the wish of his daughter Barbara. Among Fühmann's children's books are fairy tales, puppet plays, plays on the German language (Lustiges Tier-ABC, Die dampfenden Hälse der Pferde im Turm von Babel) and retellings of classical literature (Reineke Fuchs, Das Hölzerne Pferd [the Iliad and the Odyssey] and Prometheus [Die Titanenschlacht]), and he corresponded with many young readers.

Many of Fühmann's early short stories are autobiographical, and in Das Judenauto he describes memories of his childhood and youth. He later dealt with his involvement in Nazi Germany. The concept and the possibility of "change" (in his case, from a supporter of Nazism to a dedicated socialist) were especially important to Fühmann, and play a leading role in Zweiundzwanzig Tage oder Die Hälfte des Lebens (one of his major works, a spare diary of a trip to Hungary).

In his work, Fühmann emphasized fairly tales, sagas and myths. This preoccupation penetrates many of his books, from his children's books to his short stories (Das Ohr des Dionysios) and essays. With the latter, Fühmann encouraged the publication of authors whose work had rarely appeared in East Germany (such as Georg Trakl and Sigmund Freud).

Beginning with Zweiundzwanzig Tage, Fühmann increasingly criticized the socialist society of East Germany. In a number of letters and later speeches, he attempted to convince East German politicians to change their policies regarding culture. This attitude became more visible in his work, especially in Saiäns-fiktschen. He withdrew from his connections to cultural politics in East Germany, such as the Schriftstellerverband der DDR (Writers' Union of East Germany) and the Akademie der Künste. In later life he began to despair of the political conditions in East Germany (as reflected in his correspondence with Christa Wolf, Monsieur – wir finden uns wieder), and was unable to finish his long-planned magnum opus (which he called Bergwerksprojekt in his letters and notes). It was published posthumously in 1993 as Im Berg, with the subtitle (added by himself) Fragments of a Failure. Fühmann said a year before his death, "I have cruel pains; the bitterest is having failed in literature and in the hope for a society as we all once dreamt it."

The Academy of the Arts in Berlin has administered Fühmann's literary estate. His library (consisting of about 17,000 volumes, with many notes and underlinings) is part of the Historische Sammlungen of the Zentral- und Landesbibliothek Berlin. His work still interests young artists (such as Barbara Gauger), and the Franz Fühmann Freundeskreis Märkisch Buchholz in Berlin illustrates its extent.

== Bibliography ==
=== Literature for children and young adults ===
- "Die Suche nach dem wunderbunten Vögelchen" ("The Search for the Wonderfully-Colored Little Bird") (short story). Der Kinderbuchverlag, Berlin (1960)
- "Lustiges Tier-ABC" ("Merry Animal Alphabet") (lyrical poem). Der Kinderbuchverlag, Berlin (1962)
- Das hölzerne Pferd: die Sage vom Untergang Trojas und von den Irrfahrten des Odysseus. Nach Homer und anderen Quellen neu erzählt (The Wooden Horse: The Saga of Troy's Decline and the Wandering of Odysseus. New Narrative from Homer and Other Sources). Neues Leben, Berlin (1968)
- Shakespeare-Märchen (Shakespeare Tales). Der Kinderbuchverlag, Berlin (1968)
- Prometheus: Die Titanenschlacht (Prometheus: The Titanic Battle) (novel). Der Kinderbuchverlag, Berlin (1974)
- Die dampfenden Hälse der Pferde im Turm von Babel (The Steaming Necks of the Horses in the Tower of Babel). Der Kinderbuchverlag, Berlin (1978) (reprint: Hinstorff Verlag, Rostock 2005)
- Schlipperdibix und Klapperdibax! (Two Clown Pieces). Hinstorff Verlag, Rostock, 1985 (second edition 1989)
- Märchen auf Bestellung (Fairy Tales) edited by Ingrid Prignitz. Hinstorff, Rostock (1990)

=== Poems and fairy tales ===
- "Die Fahrt nach Stalingrad" ("The Trip to Stalingrad") (poem). Aufbau, Berlin (1953)
- Die Richtung der Märchen (The Direction of Fairy Tales). Aufbau, Berlin (1962)
- Miklós Radnóti: Ansichtskarten (Picture Postcards). Volk und Welt, Berlin (1967)

=== Stories ===
- Kameraden (Comrades) (novella). Aufbau, Berlin (1955)
- Kabelkran und blauer Peter (Cable Crane and Blue Peter). Hinstorff, Rostock (1961)
- Böhmen am Meer (Bohemia by the Sea) (novella). Hinstorff, Rostock (1962)
- Das Judenauto (The Jewish Car) (short stories). Aufbau, Berlin (1962)
- "Barlach in Güstrow" (short story). Hinstorff, Rostock (1963)
- König Ödipus (King Oedipus) (short stories). Aufbau, Berlin (1966)
- Zweiundzwanzig Tage oder Die Hälfte des Lebens (Twenty-Two Days, or Half a Life) (diary). Hinstorff, Rostock (1973)
- Der Geliebte der Morgenröte (The Lover of Aurora) (short stories). Hinstorff, Rostock (1978)
- Saiäns-fiktschen (short stories). Hinstorff, Rostock (1981)
- Kirke und Odysseus (ballet). Hinstorff, Rostock (1984)
- Das Ohr des Dionysios (The Ear of Dionysus) (posthumous short stories), edited by Ingrid Prignitz. Hinstorff, Rostock (1985)

=== Essays ===
- Das mythische Element in der Literatur (The Mythical Element in Literature). Revised and expanded in: Erfahrungen und Widersprüche. Versuche über Literatur (Experiences and Contradictions: Essays About Literature). Hinstorff, Rostock (1975)
- Vor Feuerschlünden. Erfahrung mit Georg Trakls Gedicht (From the Fiery Jaws: Experience with Georg Trakl's Poetry). Hinstorff, Rostock (1982)
- Meine Bibel; Erfahrungen (My Bible: Experience). Reclam, Leipzig (1983)

=== Other literary forms ===
- Galina Ulanowa. Berlin: Henschelverlag (1961)
- Was für eine Insel in was für einem Meer. Leben mit geistig Behinderten (What Kind of Island in What Kind of Sea: Life with the Developmentally Disabled) (photographs by Dietmar Riemann). Rostock: Hinstorff (1985)
- Die Schatten. Hörspiel (The Shadows) (radio play, edited by Ingrid Prignitz). Rostock: Hinstorff (1986)
- Urworte. Deutsch. Aus Steputats Reimlexikon (Primitive Words [German] From 'Steputat's Rhyming Dictionary'), edited by Ingrid Prignitz. Rostock: Hinstorff (1988)
- Alkestis. Libretto (edited by Ingrid Prignitz). Rostock: Hinstorff (1989)

=== Collections ===
- Im Berg. Texte aus dem Nachlaß (In the Mountain: Works From the Estate), edited by Ingrid Prignitz. Rostock: Hinstorff (1991)
- Prometheus. Die Zeugung (Prometheus: The Procreation), edited by Sigurd Schmidt. Rostock: Hinstorff (1996)
- Das Ruppiner Tagebuch (The Ruppin Diary). Rostock: Hinstorff (2005)
- Autorisierte Werkausgaben in Einzelbänden. Rostock: Hinstorff (1977–1988)
  - Erzählungen 1955–1975 (1977)
  - Gedichte und Nachdichtungen (1978)
  - Das Judenauto, Kabelkran und Blauer Peter, Zweiundzwanzig Tage oder Die Hälfte des Lebens (1979)
  - Irrfahrt und Heimkehr der Odysseus, Prometheus, Der Geliebte der Morgenröte und andere Erzählungen (1980)
  - Reineke Fuchs, Märchen nach Shakespeare, Das Nibelungenlied, Märchen auf Bestellung (1981)
  - Essays, Gespräche (Essays 1964–1981) (1983)
  - Vor Feuerschlünden. Erfahrung mit Georg Trakls Gedicht (1984)
  - Simplicius Simplicissimus, Der Nibelunge Not und andere Arbeiten für den Film (1987)
  - Unter den PARANYAS (Dream Experiences and Notations) (1988)

=== Letters ===
- Briefe. 1950–1984. Eine Auswahl (Letters 1950–1984: A Selection), edited by Hans-Jürgen Schmitt. Rostock: Hinstorff (1994)
- Monsieur – wir finden uns wieder. Briefe 1968–1984 (Monsieur – We Find Ourselves Again: Correspondence with Christa Wolf), edited by Angela Drescher. Berlin: Aufbau (1995)
- Margarete Hannsmann: Protokolle aus der Dämmerung. 1977–1984. Begegnungen und Briefwechsel zwischen Franz Fühmann, Margarete Hannsmann und HAP Grieshaber (Protocols from the Dawn, 1977–1984: Meetings and Correspondence Between Franz Fühmann, Margarete Hannsmann and HAP Grieshaber). Rostock: Hinstorff (2000)
- Briefe aus der Werkstatt des Nachdichters. Mitgeteilt vom Addressaten Paul Kárpáti (Letters from the Workplace of the Nachdichter: Communicated by the Addressee, Paul Kárpáti). Leipzig, Budapest: Engelsdorfer Verlag, Argumentum Kiadó (2007)

== Filmography ==
Films based on Franz Fühmann's works, or for which he wrote the script:

- Betrogen bis zum jüngsten Tag (Duped Till Doomsday) (1957): Directed by Kurt Jung-Alsen (with Rudolf Ulrich and Wolfgang Kieling) from Kameraden
- Die heute über 40 sind (1960): Directed by Kurt Jung-Alsen (with Rudolf Ulrich). Script: Franz Fühmann
- Der Schwur des Soldaten Pooley (The Survivor / The Story of Private Pooley) (1961): Directed by Kurt Jung-Alsen. Script: Franz Fühmann
- Die Suche nach dem wunderbunten Vögelchen (1964): Directed by Rolf Losansky (with Lieselott Baumgarten and Fred Delmare) from the children's story of the same name
- Köpfchen Kamerad (1965): Directed by Otto Holub (with Fred Delmare). Script: Franz Fühmann
- Der verlorene Engel (The Lost Angel) (1966): Directed by Ralf Kirsten from the novella, Das schlimme Jahr
- Das Geheimnis des Ödipus (The Secret of Oedipus) (1973–74): Directed by Kurt Jung-Alsen. Script: Franz Fühmann
- Der Fall Ö. (1991): Directed by Rainer Simon (with Matthias Habich and Jan Josef Liefers) from the short story, "König Ödipus"
