= The River Line (play) =

1952 play

- Original language: English
- Written by: Charles Langbridge Morgan
- Genre: War drama
- Setting: Toulouse, 1943; Gloucestershire, 1947

Premiere
- Date: 11 August 1952
- Place: Opera House, Manchester

The River Line is a 1952 stage play by the British writer Charles Langbridge Morgan, based on his own 1949 novel of the same title. It premiered at the Manchester Opera House before transferring to the Lyric Theatre in Hammersmith and then the Strand Theatre in London's West End. Its combined London run at the Lyric and the Strand lasted for 205 performances between 2 September 1952 and 7 March 1953. The London cast featured Paul Scofield, Phil Brown, Michael Goodliffe, John Westbrook, Robert Hardy, Marcel Poncin, Pamela Brown, Marjorie Fielding and Virginia McKenna.

== Synopsis ==
In the Second World War a soldier is killed in the mistaken belief that he is a secret German agent.

== Film adaptation ==
In 1964 it was adapted into the West German film The River Line directed by Rudolf Jugert and Peter van Eyck, Marie Versini and Walter Rilla.

== Bibliography ==
- Goble, Alan. The Complete Index to Literary Sources in Film. Walter de Gruyter, 1999.
- Wearing, J.P. The London Stage 1950–1959: A Calendar of Productions, Performers, and Personnel. Rowman & Littlefield, 2014.
