= Hannes Fischer =

German actor and stage director

Hannes Fischer (23 December 1925 – 22 January 1989) was a German actor and stage director. He was the Artistic Director of the Staatsschauspiel Dresden.

== Filmography ==
Year	Title	Role	Notes
1949	The Blue Swords	Student in Wittenberg	
1955	Ernst Thälmann – Führer seiner Klasse	Hauck, jun.	
1955	Duped Till Doomsday	Küchenunteroffizier	
1957	Spielbank-Affäre	Dr. Müller	
1959	The Tinder Box	Der Dicke	
1959	Before the Lightning Strikes	Rudi Molle - Sportredakteur	
1959	Love's Confusion	Professor Kienbaum	
1960	Hochmut kommt vor dem Knall	Filmregisseur	
1961	Der Tod hat ein Gesicht	Staatsanwalt	
1961	The Dress	Der Dicke	
1962	Die Jagd nach dem Stiefel	Polizeirat Klisch	
1963	Nebel	Mr. Hary	
1963	Jetzt und in der Stunde meines Todes	Frank Müller	
1964	Das Lied vom Trompeter	Polizeipräsident Füllbrink	
1967	Ein Lord am Alexanderplatz	Dr. Schiesser	
1969	Lebende Ware	Dieter Wisliceny	
1969	Wie heiratet man einen König	Vogt	
1969	Weiße Wölfe	Bryde	
1973	Aus dem Leben eines Taugenichts	Portier	
1978	Einer muß die Leiche sein		
1978	Zünd an, es kommt die Feuerwehr	Karl May	
