= Harry Wüstenhagen =

German actor

- Born: 11 January 1928; Berlin, German Reich
- Died: 11 December 1999 (aged 71); Grant-Valkaria, Florida, U.S
- Occupation: Actor
- Years active: 1953-1988

Harry Wüstenhagen (11 January 1928 – 11 December 1999) was a German film actor. He appeared in 45 films between 1953 and 1988. He was born in Berlin, Germany and died in Florida. Wüstenhagen was the German dubbing voice for Sherlock Holmes in Sherlock Holmes and the Deadly Necklace (1962), A Study in Terror (1965), The Seven-Per-Cent Solution (1976), The Hound of the Baskervilles (1983) and The Sign of Four (1983).

== Filmography ==
Year	Title	Role	Notes
1953	Die Prinzessin und der Schweinehirt		
1955	Der gestiefelte Kater	Hans / Heinrich, Graf von Karabass	
1955	Rumpelstiltskin	Schatzmeister	
1956	Max and Moritz	Maler-Dichter	
1957	Mischief in Wonderland		
1957	Precocious Youth	Abteilungsleiter Hennig	
1958	Confess, Doctor Corda	Mitgefangener	Uncredited
1958	Piefke, der Schrecken der Kompanie	Werner Hirsekorn	Uncredited
1960	Ich schwöre und gelobe	Dr. Warzin	
1961	The Green Archer	Julius Savini	
1961	The Dead Eyes of London	Fred "Flimmer-Fred" / Flicker-Fred	(German version) / (English version)
1961	The Miracle of Father Malachia	Man	Voice, Uncredited
1962	The Invisible Dr. Mabuse	Clown Bobo	Voice, Uncredited
1962	Sherlock Holmes and the Deadly Necklace	Sherlock Holmes	Voice
1963	The Black Abbot	Arthur Gine	
1964	A Mission for Mr. Dodd	Mr. Bland	
1964	The Curse of the Hidden Vault	Goyle	
1968	The Hound of Blackwood Castle	Ken Nelson	
1969	The Man with the Glass Eye	Parker	
1970	Die Feuerzangenbowle	Round table	
1973	Maria d'Oro und Bello Blue	Notar	Voice
1979	The Prisoner of Zenda		
1982	Unterwegs nach Atlantis	Mark's Father	TV Series, 7 episodes
1988	Der Experte	Jacobi	
