= Max and Moritz (film) =

1956 film

Max und Moritz
- Directed by: Norbert Schultze
- Written by: Norbert Schultze; Francesco Stefani
- Based on: Max and Moritz by Wilhelm Busch
- Produced by: Alfred Förster
- Starring: Kristian Schultze; Norbert Schultze junior; Harry Wüstenhagen; Edith Elsholtz; Erika Nymgau-Odemar
- Cinematography: Fritz Lehmann; Ted Kornowicz
- Edited by: Annelies Kriegar
- Music by: Norbert Schultze
- Production company: Förster Film
- Release date: 28 September 1956
- Running time: 73 minutes
- Country: Germany
- Language: German

Max and Moritz (German: Max und Moritz) is a 1956 German musical film directed by Norbert Schultze. It stars Kristian Schultze and Norbert Schultze junior as the title characters. The film premiered on 28 September 1956 at Uhlenhorst Lichtspiele in Hamburg.

== Plot ==
A poet and a lady narrate the story of the rogues Max and Moritz. The film is largely based on the original story Max and Moritz by humorist Wilhelm Busch.

== Cast ==
- Kristian Schultze – Moritz
- Norbert Schultze junior – Max
- Harry Wüstenhagen – The Poet
- Edith Elsholtz – The Woman
- Erika Nymgau-Odemar – The Widow
- Günther E. Bein – The Tailor
- Walther Diehl – The Teacher
- Gregor F. Ehlers – The Uncle
- Wulf Rittscher – The Baker
- Rolf Menke – The Farmer
- Wolfgang Erich Parge – The Miller
