= Il Pioniere =

Weekly children's magazine in Italy (1950–1970)

- Former editors: Gianni Rodari; Dina Rinaldi
- Categories: Children's magazine
- Frequency: Weekly
- Founded: 1950
- Final issue: 1970
- Country: Italy
- Based in: Rome
- Language: Italian

Il Pioniere (Italian: The Pioneer) was a weekly children's comic magazine which existed between 1950 and 1970. It was headquartered in Rome, Italy. The magazine was close to the Italian Communist Party although it did not overtly contain political writings.

== History and profile ==
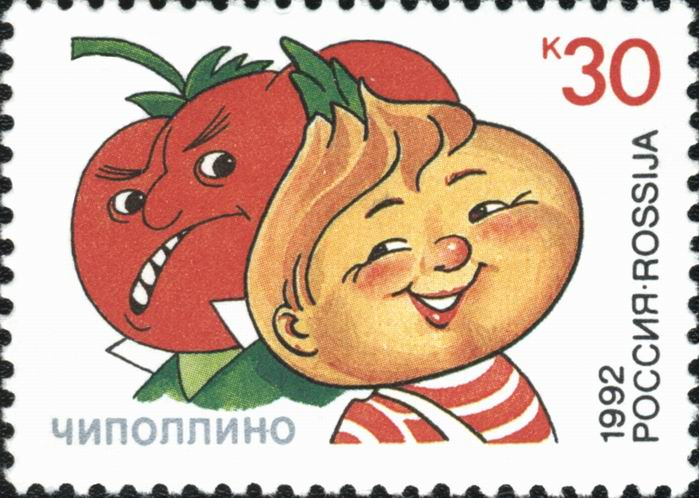
Signor Tomato and Cipollino, one of the comic characters featured in Il Pioniere, on a Russian stamp dated 1992

Il Pioniere was founded in Rome as a weekly magazine in 1950. The magazine was the official media outlet of a scout organization, namely Italian Pioneers' Association. The Communist Party officials invited Gianni Rodari to Rome to launch Il Pioniere. Its first directors of the magazine were Gianni Rodari and Dina Rinaldi. Rodari served in the post until 1953.

Il Pioniere supported anti-fascism, democracy and pacifism. The magazine did not contain any political messages, but attempted to provide a moral and ideal message using its illustrated stories and tales to its readers. However, it featured leading Communist leaders, including Yugoslav leader Josip Broz Tito. It covered Italian comics, including Cipollino, Chiodino and Atomino, and did not feature any American comics.

Il Pioniere began to decline in 1966 and folded in 1970.
