= Almanzor's Rings =

- Russian: Кольца Альманзора
- Directed by: Igor Voznesensky
- Written by: Valentin Vinogradov
- Starring: Svetlana Smirnova; Mikhail Kononov; Valentina Talyzina; Lyudmila Dmitrieva; Boris Ivanov
- Cinematography: Aleksandr Rybin
- Edited by: E. Sheyneman
- Music by: Yevgeny Krylatov
- Release date: 1977
- Running time: 61 minute
- Country: Soviet Union
- Language: Russian

Almanzor's Rings (Russian: Кольца Альманзора) is a 1977 Soviet fantasy action film directed by Igor Voznesensky. It was based on the play Tin Rings by Tamara Gabbe.

== Plot ==
In the kingdoms of Phazania and Pavlinia, a dynastic dilemma arises as Queen January II has two daughters, Augusta and Aleli. Augusta is somewhat unkind, while Aleli is rather simple-minded. To resolve this, the Queen consults the wizard Almanzor, who provides her with two tin rings. These rings are meant to bring happiness to one princess and her chosen partner, granting both what they lack. Almanzor asks the sisters to choose between a golden and a tin ring. Greedy Augusta picks the golden one, while the eccentric Aleli takes the tin ring, instantly feeling content.

The next day, Aleli encounters Zenziver, the palace gardener, whose kindness and uniqueness captivate her. Unlike others in the palace, he doesn’t consider her foolish, and she begins to feel a special affection for him. Meanwhile, two suitor princes arrive — the arrogant Abaldon and cowardly Aldebaran. The prime minister Intrigio favors Abaldon and gives him the second ring. However, Abaldon only desires the throne through marriage, not Aleli herself, and discards the ring after she refuses him. A pirate named Muhamiel, hoping to use the rings to acquire a new ship, kidnaps the princesses. Zenziver, finding Aleli’s discarded tin ring in the garden, realizes she is in danger. He rescues the princesses and even saves the cowardly princes. Although the Queen disapproves of her daughter’s match with a gardener, Aleli decides to leave the palace with Zenziver. For Aleli, true love was what she lacked, and for Zenziver, who had often been confined, freedom was missing. Almanzor affirms that the rings did bring happiness to the couple, with his apprentice Chimeo adding that he never found Aleli foolish.

== Cast ==
- Svetlana Smirnova as princess Aleli (singing by Tatyana Daskovskaya)
- Mikhail Kononov as Zenziver, gardener
- Valentina Talyzina as Queen Yanuariya II
- Lyudmila Dmitrieva as princess Avgusta
- Boris Ivanov as Intrigio, prime minister
- Fyodor Nikitin as Almanzor, wizard
- Feliks Rostotsky as Khimio, Almanzor's apprentice and sidekick
- Viktor Pavlov as Abaldon, prince heir of Shutlandia ("Jesterland")
- Roman Tkachuk as prince Aldebaran
- Leonid Kanevskiy as Mukhamiel, pirate captain
