= 2703 Rodari =

Main belt asteroid

Discovery
- Discovered by: Nikolai Chernykh
- Discovery site: Crimean Astrophysical Observatory
- Discovery date: 29 March 1979

Designations
- Named after: Gianni Rodari
- Alternative designations: 1976 MN · 1979 FT_{2} · 1979 GU
- Minor planet category: Main belt

Orbital characteristics
- Epoch 21 November 2025 (JD 2461000.5)
- Uncertainty parameter 0
- Aphelion: 2.31946 AU
- Perihelion: 2.06736 AU
- Semi-major axis: 2.19341 AU
- Eccentricity: 0.05746
- Orbital period (sidereal): 3.24854 y (1186.53 d)
- Mean anomaly: 111.348°
- Mean motion: 0.30341° / d
- Inclination: 6.03283°
- Longitude of ascending node: 49.3864°
- Argument of perihelion: 171.785°
- Jupiter MOID: 2.64616 AU
- T_{Jupiter}: 3.661

Physical characteristics
- Mean diameter: 7.63 km
- Sidereal rotation period: 5.5 h
- Spectral type: S-type
- Absolute magnitude (H): 13.66

2703 Rodari (provisional designation 1979 FT_{2}) is an asteroid located in the main asteroid belt. Discovered by Nikolai Chernykh at the Crimean Astrophysical Observatory on 29 March 1979, it was named in honor of Italian journalist and children's author Gianni Rodari by the Minor Planet Center (MPC). It is 7.63 kilometres (4.74 mi) in size and classified as a stony S-type asteroid. From 1996 to 1999, it was briefly considered as a target for the European Space Agency's Rosetta comet probe, though the agency eventually dropped it in favor of alternative main-belt targets.

== Discovery and naming ==
Rodari was discovered on 29 March 1979 by astronomer Nikolai Chernykh at the Crimean Astrophysical Observatory, with the object receiving the provisional designation 1979 FT_{2} from the Minor Planet Center (MPC). It was later assigned the minor planet number of 2703, and on 2 July 1985 the MPC named it Rodari in memory of Gianni Rodari (1920–1980). Gianni Rodari was an Italian writer and journalist who wrote 25 works of children's literature, winning the Hans Christian Andersen Medal in 1970 for his contributions as a children's author.

== Orbit ==
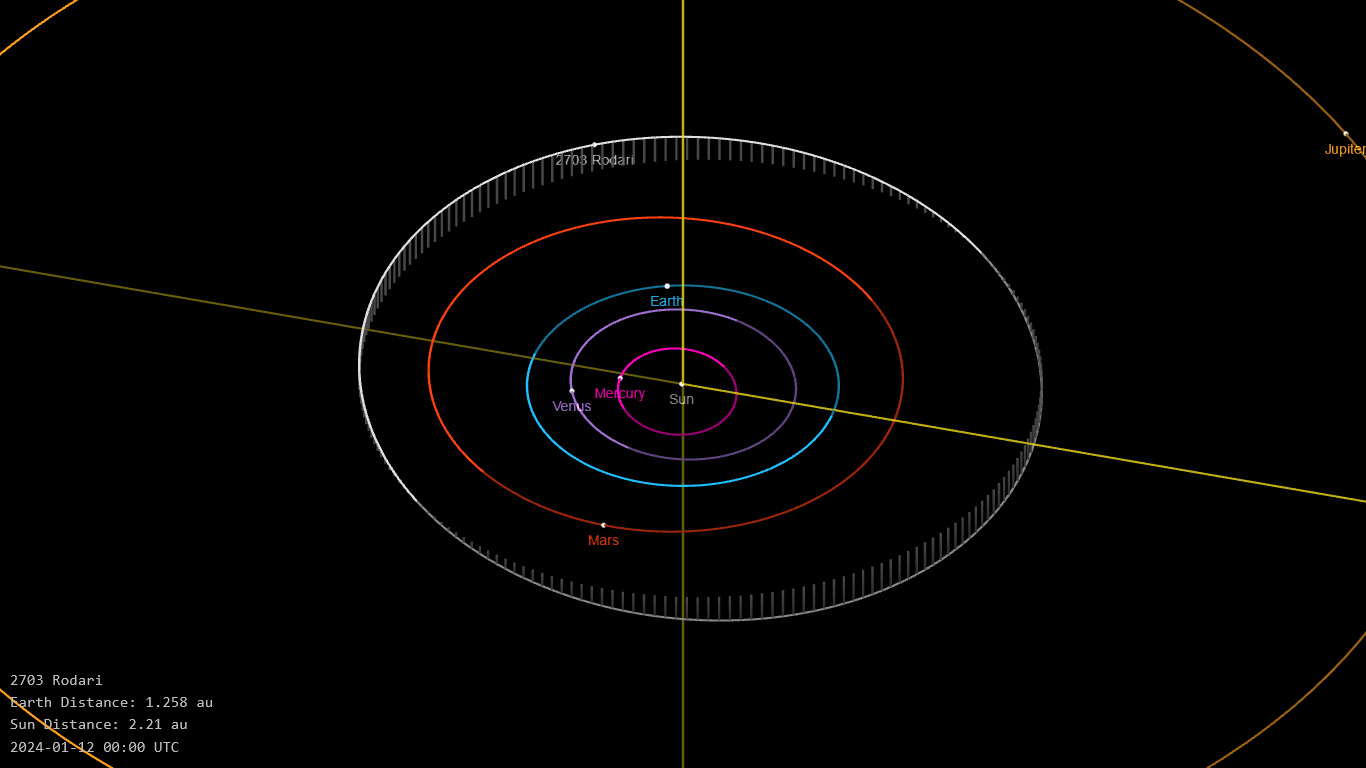
Diagram showing Rodari's orbit between Mars and Jupiter

Rodari orbits the Sun at an average distance—its semi-major axis—of 2.19 astronomical units (AU), placing it in the main asteroid belt. Along its 3.25 year long orbit, its distance from the Sun varies between 2.07 AU at perihelion to 2.32 AU at aphelion due to its orbital eccentricity of 0.06. Its orbit is inclined by 6.03° with respect to the ecliptic plane.

== Physical characteristics ==
Rodari is estimated to be 7.63 kilometres (4.74 mi) in size, and is classified as a stony S-type asteroid. Observations of Rodari's lightcurve, or variations in its observed brightness, show that it is quite asymmetric, complicating the determination of its rotation period. Nevertheless, analysis by a team of astronomers led by Claudia A. Angeli and published in 2001 revealed that it has a rotation period of about 5.5 hours.

== Exploration ==
Rodari was chosen as the second flyby target for the European Space Agency's (ESA) Rosetta mission in 1996, replacing 2530 Shipka to conserve delta-v. Under the 1996 mission baseline, Rosetta would have encountered Rodari on 5 April 2008 following an earlier encounter with 3840 Mimistrobell in 2006. It would then continue en route to comet 46P/Wirtanen. However, the ESA again changed Rosetta's targets in 1999, dropping Rodari and Mimistrobell in favor of 140 Siwa and 4979 Otawara as they viewed Siwa as more scientifically interesting. Originally planned to launch on 12 January 2003, Rosetta missed both targets and 46P/Wirtanen due to issues with the Ariane 5 rocket. It launched in 2004, visiting 2867 Šteins, 21 Lutetia, and its primary target 67P/Churyumov–Gerasimenko.
