= The Singing Ringing Tree =

- Das singende, klingende Bäumchen
- Directed by: Francesco Stefani
- Written by: Anne Geelhaar; Francesco Stefani
- Produced by: Alexander Delete
- Starring: Richard Krüger; Eckart Dux; Christel Bodenstein
- Cinematography: Karl Plintzner
- Edited by: Christa Wenicke
- Music by: Heinz-Friedel Heddenhausen
- Distributed by: DEFA
- Release date: 13 December 1957
- Running time: 73 minutes
- Country: East Germany
- Language: German

The Singing Ringing Tree (Note: Most English sources omit the comma shown in the German title.) (German: Das singende, klingende Bäumchen) is a 1957 children's fantasy film from East German studio DEFA. The film is directed by Francesco Stefani, with the screenplay by Anne Geelhaar.

The film's plot is based on a variation of the fairy tale "The Singing, Ringing Tree, or the Punished Presumption" (Das singende klingende Bäumchen, oder der bestrafte Uebermuth) from the 1801 fairy tale collection "Fairy Tales", which bears similarities to the fairy tale "The Dwarf, the Fox and the Princess" (Hurleburlebutz) in the Brothers Grimms' Children's and Household Tales (Grimms' Fairy Tales) published in 1812. The film is considered one of the best fairy tale productions in DEFA film history.

== Plot ==
A handsome prince arrives at the king's castle to woo his daughter. However, the haughty princess spurns his gift, a chest full of precious pearls, tipping them out on the floor and saying, "Any fool could give me pearls like these." Instead, she demands the singing, ringing tree. After a long search, the prince finally meets a dwarf, the ruler of an enchanted kingdom where the little tree stands, and who is willing to let him have it in exchange for a bargain: the tree will only sing and ring if the princess truly loves the prince; if the tree remains silent, however, the prince will have to live as a bear in the dwarf's kingdom. Confident of victory, the prince agrees.

Upon arriving at the castle, the little tree remains silent, and the princess again rejects the prince. Sadly, he returns to the dwarf with the tree, who transforms him into a bear. The princess, however, desperately wants the tree and to hear it sing, and sends her father to fetch it. The king finally arrives at the border of the dwarf's magical realm, where the bear presents him with the tree. However, he only gives it to him on the condition that he is given the first creature the king encounters upon his return to the castle. Since the king's dogs always greet him first, the king agrees. However, it is his impatient daughter who greets him first, whereupon she is placed under heightened security in the castle.

When the bear realises that the king will not keep his word, he breaks into the castle to take the princess. He abducts her to the enchanted realm, where the dwarf makes her inner ugliness visible by transforming her golden curls into poisonous green hair and disfiguring her beautiful face with a long nose. The princess is furious at her ugliness but soon realises that she must now fend for herself. For the first time in her life, she gathers fruit from a bush herself and builds a shelter for her and the bear. She asks the bear to make sure that the animals of the enchanted land come to her, to which the bear replies that it is up to her: she can make sure that the animals like her, for they can sense the true nature of people.

The dwarf enjoys teasing the princess with his magic. However, this gives the princess the opportunity to help the animals out of perilous situations, allowing her to gradually regain her beauty. The dwarf realises that the princess is changing for the better. He lures her out of the magic realm with the lie that her father is gravely ill. When the princess arrives at the castle and learns that her father is well and has been searching for her throughout the land, she sees through the dwarf's deception. Suddenly, she hears the little tree singing in the castle garden and returns to the magic realm with it. Although the dwarf does everything he can to block her way, the princess, with the help of the animals she had once helped, manages to return to the bear. The tree's singing breaks the bear's curse, and he becomes the prince once more. The two happily return to the castle. They leave the singing, ringing tree in the magic land so that it will bring good luck to whoever finds it.

== Cast ==
In credits order.

- Christel Bodenstein as the haughty princess
- Charles Hans Vogt as the king
- Eckart Dux as the handsome prince/bear
- Richard Krüger as the dwarf
- Dorothea Tiesing as the nurse
- Günther Polensen as the captain of the guard
- Fredy Barton as the minister
- Egon Vogel as captain and master of ceremonies
- Paul Knopf as the guardian
- Paul Pfingst as Bauer
- Friedrich Teitge as the gardener
- Maria Besendahl (Anna-Maria Besendahl) as the herbalist
- Tony Bilbow (English narration) as Antony Bilbow

== Production ==
The film was shot in colour entirely in the studio in Potsdam, Brandenburg, East Germany. Set designer Erich Zander created a fairytale world that, with its deliberate artificiality, contrasts sharply with reality and dispenses with any historical elements. Special effects specialist Ernst Kunstmann created the special effects, particularly the many transformations within the film.

There was later confusion as to whether the actor who played the dwarf was named Richard Krüger and died in Strasbourg, or was Hermann Emmrich who died in 1995 and is buried in Prenzlau in north eastern Germany. It is now thought that they were one and the same person.

== Release ==
The Singing Ringing Tree was released in East German cinemas on 13 December 1957, and was shown in West German cinemas from 14 September 1958. In these two years alone, nearly 6 million viewers saw the film in German cinemas.

The film was then purchased by the BBC and cut into three parts to create a mini-series with an English-language voice-over track where the original soundtrack was simply faded up and down as opposed to being dubbed. According to the Radio Times entries in BBC Genome Project, it was first broadcast on BBC 1 on 19 and 26 November, and 3 December 1964 as part of the Tales from Europe strand. It was then repeated in March 1966, November 1969, October 1971, September 1976, April 1977 and August 1980.

It was first broadcast on East German television on DFF 1 on 2 July1977. It was first shown on West German television on 3 January 1988, on West 3.

== Home media ==
The original film version has been released in many countries on VHS, DVD and streaming services, and on Blu-ray in Germany by Icestorm Entertainment and the UK by Network Distributing. Both Blu-rays have the film in both its original widescreen theatrical and 1.33:1 television aspect ratios. They also have the original German-language soundtrack with optional voice-over tracks in English, French and Spanish, and various extra features.

== Critical reception ==
The public response to this film in the GDR was anything but positive. Deutsche Filmkunst wrote

The new DEFA fairy tale film is ... in its entire present conception full of mendacious monarchical romanticism and not suitable for contributing to the character and will formation of our children (…) such a fairy-tale prince is practically the prototype of bourgeois educational ideals, which are then conjured up again on the screen in many modified forms, in uniform or civilian clothes, for the youngsters in the capitalist entertainment industry.

The Singing Ringing Tree is considered to be an outstanding example of the fairy tale adaptations that were exclusively produced in the studios of the former DEFA studio complex, now Studio Babelsberg in Potsdam, and which continue to be shown in cinemas and on television. These also include the film adaptations of King Thrushbeard (König Drosselbart (1965)), Three Wishes for Cinderella (1973), and Snow White (1961).

The Filmdienst magazine's Encyclopedia of International Films (Lexikon des internationalen Films) describes the film as:

A stylistically charming fairy tale, filmed entirely in studio settings and based on motifs by the Brothers Grimm: A prince transformed into a bear wins the heart of a haughty princess, who, in the enchanted realm, becomes a helpful and animal-loving person. A children's film that can stimulate the imagination of young viewers. (Alternative titles: "In the Enchanted Realm of the Mountain Spirit," "The Singing, Ringing Tree") - Suitable for ages 6 and up.

Critic Rosemary Creeser notes that the whole film is packed with dark erotic symbolism.She argues that the ring of fire, through which the princess passes after discovering her true, good self, represents the breaking of the Oedipal bond with her father and her acceptance of her own sexuality. Creeser further believes that the perfect world which is created as the prince is turned back into a man chimed with the utopian aspirations of Sixties audiences.

Writer and historian Marina Warner discusses the film in her book From the Beast to the Blonde:

The Singing, Ringing Tree seems strangely more relevant now than it did 10 years ago ...Harry Potter and The Lord of the Rings film have brought the idea of fantasy with a strong moral message back into the mainstream. And somehow the East German state pedagogy, for all its risible earnestness, managed to do this in a way which is more idyllic, more heart-warming than these blockbuster films with all their merchandising.

She also observes that "Fairy tales have enduring themes. [The Singing Ringing Tree] shows a world where kindness and mutual endeavour triumph over pride and selfishness. These are things that children want. Even British children haven't had that mobile-phoned out of them quite yet."

In the UK the TV series, partly due to its foreignness as both fairy tale and for the unfamiliarity of its German production, was "indelibly carved on the psyches" as "one of the most frightening things ever shown on children's television". Tim Worthington describes the film as:

"Closer to a nightmare than a fairytale, it looked like an abstract expressionist film that might otherwise only have been seen late at night on BBC2 ...the overt political undertones ...seemed like light relief next to the alarming shrieking light-flashing interludes ...Frightening enough to traumatise some and visually arresting enough to fascinate others ...this was a mind-bending experience indeed.

The release of the film on home video spurred renewed interest. A Radio Times readers' poll in 2004 voted this programme the 20th spookiest TV show ever.

== Adaptations and remakes ==
A spoof of the series was created as a sketch in the last season of The Fast Show (1997), entitled, Ton Singingen Ringingen Bingingen Plingingen Tingingen Plinkingen Plonkingen Boinging Triee.

A live stage adaptation of the DEFA film has run at the Boulevard Theater in Dresden since 2013.

In 2016, director Wolfgang Eißler filmed the fairy tale again, this time with Hamburg actress Jytte-Merle Böhrnsen in the lead role of the princess. Christel Bodenstein, the princess from the original DEFA fairy tale film, appears in the role of a herbalist.

== Other works inspired by the film ==
In 2006, a wind-powered sound sculpture titled Singing Ringing Tree, named after the film, was erected in the landscape of the Pennine hill range overlooking Burnley, in Lancashire, England. It resembles a windswept tree. In March 2017, a second Singing Ringing Tree was set on the outskirts of Austin, Texas in the United States in the rural area of a small town called Manor.

== Legacy ==
Comedy podcast RiffTrax (Michael J. Nelson, Bill Corbett and Kevin Murphy) recorded and released a mocking riff of the film in 2026.
