= The Tinder Box (film) =

1959 film

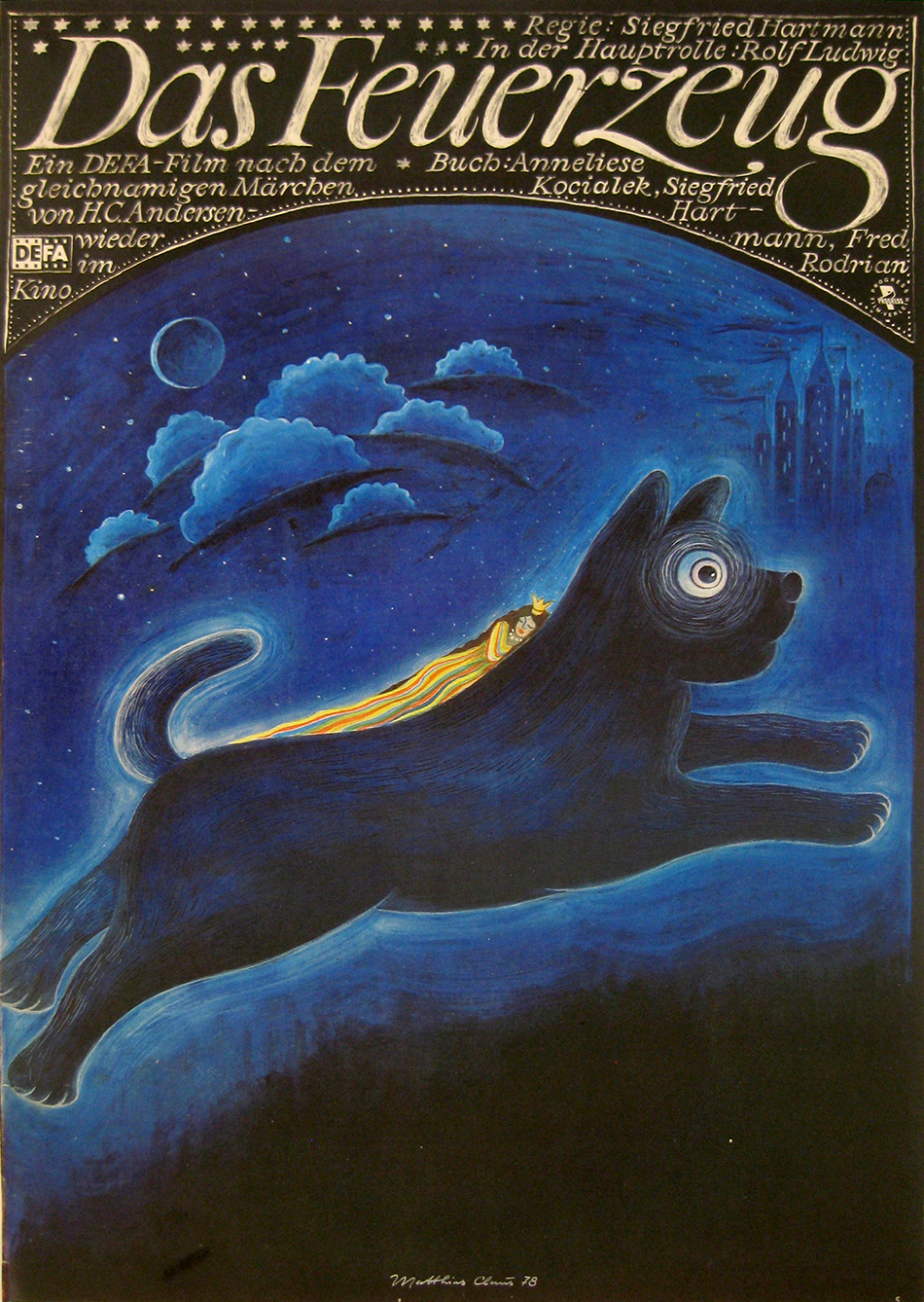
- Poster (1978) by Matthias Claus
- Directed by: Siegfried Hartmann
- Written by: Hans Christian Andersen; Siegfried Hartmann
- Starring: Rolf Ludwig
- Release date: 18 April 1959
- Running time: 83 minutes
- Country: East Germany
- Language: German

The Tinder Box (German: Das Feuerzeug) is an East German fantasy film directed by Siegfried Hartmann. It was released in 1959.

It was later purchased by the BBC and shown as part of their Tales from Europe series of dubbed films on children's television, first shown in 1964 and repeated in 1970 and 1972.

== Cast ==
- Rolf Ludwig as Der Soldat / The Soldier
- Detlef Heintze as Hans/ The Apprentice
- Heinz Schubert as Der Geizige / The Miser
- Hans Fiebrandt as Der König / The King
- Maria Besendahl as Die Königin / The Queen
- Senta Bonacker as Die Kammerfrau / The Lady-in-waiting
- Rolf Defrank as Der Eitle / The Vain Man
- Hannes Fischer as Der Dicke / The Fat Man
- Fritz Schlegel as Der Wirt / The Innkeeper
- Barbara Mehlan as Die Prinzessin / The Princess
- Maria Wendt as Altes Mütterchen / The Old Woman
- Bella Waldritter: Die Hexe / The Witch

== Reception ==
The picture sold 5,429,103 tickets.
