= Roman Tkachuk =

USSR theatre and film actor (1932-1994)

- Roman Tkachuk in 1971
- Born: Roman Denisovich Tkachuk; August 31, 1932; Sverdlovsk (now Yekaterinburg), USSR
- Died: January 10, 1994 (aged 61); Moscow, Russia
- Occupation: actor
- Years active: 1956—1994

Roman Denisovich Tkachuk (Russian: Роман Денисович Ткачук; August 31, 1932 — January 10, 1994) was a Soviet theatre and film actor.

== Biography ==
He was born on August 31, 1932, in Sverdlovsk (now Yekaterinburg), USSR.

He graduated from the Film and Theatre Institute named after Aleksandr Ostrovsky in Tashkent in 1955.

In late 1993, Tkachuk's wife, actress Maya Gnezdovskaya became seriously ill. On January 9, 1994, she was taken home from the hospital, and on the night of January 10, she died. The actor outlived her for only a few hours. He was buried with his wife in the Dolgoprudnenskoe (Central) Cemetery.

== Filmography ==
Year	Title	Role	Notes
1966	The Formula of Rainbow	Kozdolevsky	
1967	Katerina Izmailova	Village Drunk	
1967	In S. City	Volsky	
1968	Two Comrades Were Serving	white officer	
1969	Village Detective	Gennady Pozdnyakov	
1970	Step from the Roof	episode	
1971	The Ballad of Bering and His Friends	Tsar Peter I	
1971	Liberation III: Direction of the Main Blow	Alexei Yepishev	
1972	Bumbarash	commissar Zaplatin	TV movie
1972	My tri a pes z Petipes	episode	
1972	Almanzor's Rings	Aldebaran	
1973	Maturita za skolou	episode	
1973	Chipollino	Mastino	
1974	Once Alone	Dumchenko	
1975	Stories about Keshka and his friends	Yakov Grigorievich	
1975	Did They Call a Doctor?	chairman of the shop committee	
1975	Escape from the Palace	Taras Tarasovich	
1975	Between Heaven and Earth	Petro Golovko	
1976	We Didn't Learn This	Aleksandr Pavlovich Krasikov	
1976	This is the Game	Sports Committee Chairman	
1977	You to Me, Me to You	Pantykhov	
1978	A Chest of Drawers Was Driven Through the Streets	Chief's advisor	
1984	The Oath of Jantai	Yeremeychik	
1986	We Sit Well!	Pyotr Erofeevich	
1988	Heart of a Dog	Professor Nikolai Nikolaevich Persikov	TV movie
1990	My Husband is an Alien	Rashid	
1991	When You Are Late for the Registry Office...	Kokin, Timofey's father	
1994	The Master and Margarita	Shveytsar	(final film role)

== Awards ==
- People's Artist of the Uzbek SSR (1964)
- Order of the Badge of Honour (1972)
- Honored Worker of Culture of Poland (1976)
- Stanislavsky State Prize (1977)
