= Tamara Gabbe =

Russian children's playwright (1903–60)

Tamara Gabbe (1903–60) was a Russian playwright, children’s author, and editor. She adapted children's stories in Russian and wrote fairytale plays, some of which have become films and television shows.

== Life ==
Gabbe was born in 1903 to a military doctor. She grew up in the Grand Duchy of Finland, moving to St Petersburg in 1917. She studied at the Leningrad Institute of Art History in 1924–1929.

In 1931, she produced a children’s translation of Gulliver’s Travels, which became the authoritative one. She wrote fairytale plays including The City of Masters (1943), Avdotya-Riazanochka (1945) and The Tin Rings (1952). Some of these have been adapted into films and television episodes, including Vladimir Bychkov's The City of Masters (1965) and Igor Voznesensky's Almanzor's Rings (1977).

In 1933, she began working as an editor at the State Publishing House for Children’s Literature. In 1937, she and some of her colleagues at the publishing house were arrested. Some were executed or died in prison camps; Gabbe and Aleksandra Lyubarskaya were released after two years. In 1941, Gabbe’s husband Iosif Izrailevich Ginzburg was arrested for criticising the Molotov-Ribbentrop pact. Gabbe experienced the siege of Leningrad that year, and evacuated with her family in 1942.

In the 1940s, Gabbe worked as an editor in Moscow, including for Samuil Marshak and Yurii Trifonov, and produced retellings of Russian and Western children’s stories.

She died in 1960.
