= Fernsehsender Paul Nipkow =

First regular television service in the world

Fernsehsender "Paul Nipkow"
- Type: Television station
- Country: Nazi Germany
- First air date: 22 March 1935
- Availability: Germany
- Owner: Deutsche Reichspost; Ministry of Aviation; Ministry of Public Enlightenment and Propaganda
- Key people: Carl Boese; Hans-Jürgen Nierentz; Herbert Engler
- Dissolved: 19 October 1944
- Replaced by: Nordwestdeutscher Rundfunk (West Germany, television broadcasts from 1950), Deutscher Fernsehfunk (East Germany, launched in 1952), Telewizja Polska (launched in 1952, serve former parts of Germany), Soviet Central Television (for Kaliningrad region)

The Fernsehsender "Paul Nipkow" (TV Station Paul Nipkow) , also known as Deutscher Fernseh-Rundfunk (German Television Broadcasting), in Berlin, Germany, was the first regular television service in the world. It was on the air from 22 March 1935, until it was shut down in 1944. The station was named after Paul Gottlieb Nipkow, the inventor of the Nipkow disk.

== History ==
Parallel to the experiments by John Logie Baird in the United Kingdom, by Herbert E. Ives and Charles Francis Jenkins in the United States, as well as by Kenjiro Takayanagi in Japan, television pioneers like Dénes Mihály and Manfred von Ardenne had organised experimental television transmissions in Berlin since 1928. In the same year, Telefunken presented a television set prototype during the Internationale Funkausstellung industrial exhibition. From 1929 television test programs were regularly aired from the Funkturm Berlin transmitter (Rundfunksender Witzleben). The first public transmission was introduced in the Kroll Opera House on 18 April 1934. Regular programming started on 22 March 1935.

At first the station could only be received in and around Berlin, later also in other German cities via special Reichspost long distance cables. It became very popular when it covered the 1936 Summer Olympics in Berlin. About 160,000 viewers saw the Olympic games on a few private televisions and in many public television parlours. Television was used more for mainstream entertainment rather than propaganda, as Joseph Goebbels preferred radio as a mass-medium. The heavy and slow equipment made it difficult to report, and almost all programming was broadcast live. From 1942 to 1944, the Germans also restarted a TV station in Paris to broadcast programs in German and French. In 1944, the station was shut down, as were most other cultural events, as a consequence of the approach of the Allied Armies in the Normandy Campaign.

After the collapse of East Germany in 1990, about 280 rolls of 35mm film were discovered of Fernsehsender Paul Nipkow programs. In recent years, much of that material has been aired on German and international channels, mostly by The History Channel. In Germany, the rediscovered footage has been first used in the 1996 documentary Televisionen im Dritten Reich ("Tele-Visions in the Third Reich") made by WDR and NDR, as well as in Michael Kloft's 1999 documentary Das Fernsehen unter dem Hakenkreuz ("Television Under the Swastika").

== See also ==
- Einheits-Fernseh-Empfänger E1
- Television in Germany
- History of television
- History of television in Germany
- Haus des Rundfunks
