= Francesco Stefani (film director) =

German film director (1923–1989)

Francesco Stefani (also known as Franz Stefani, January 23, 1923 – November 11, 1989) was a German film director of Italian descent who was born in Offenburg and died in Munich. He became famous mostly for children's productions, especially the 1957 film The Singing Ringing Tree.

After serving in Russia during the Second World War, Stefani attended LMU Munich, where he studied art history, theatre and theology. Stefani worked as an assistant to the art historian Carl Lamb, and lived in the Federal Republic of Germany. Stefani assisted Lamb with Bustelli– Ein Spiel in Porzellan (Bustelli - A Game in Porcelain, a film about Franz Bustelli), and also appears in it.

Stefani's debut film, Zwerg Nase, was released in 1953, followed by Max und Moritz in 1957, for which he wrote the screenplay. The film was directed with composer Norbert Schultze. Stefani became famous with the 1957 film The Singing Ringing Tree, for which he led as a guest at the DEFA (GDR) Director. The film gained "cult status" in the UK after the BBC began screening it regularly.

In 1980 he was awarded the Federal Cross of Merit, in 1983 the Bavarian Order of Merit.
