= Tamara Lisitsian =

Soviet film director (1923–2009)

- Born: Tamara Nikolaevna Lisitsian; March 3, 1923; Tiflis, Transcaucasian SFSR
- Died: November 29, 2009 (aged 86); Moscow, Russian Federation
- Occupation(s): Film director, screenwriter
- Years active: 1959-2005
- Awards: Honored Artist of the RSFSR; Medal "For Courage"

Tamara Nikolaevna Lisitsian (Armenian: Լիսիցյան Թամար Նիկոլայի, Russian: Тамара Николаевна Лисициан; 3 March 1923 – 29 November 2009) was a Soviet film director and screenwriter, who received the Honored Artist of the RSFSR in 1985.

== Biography ==
Lisitsian was born on 3 March 1923 in Tiflis (now Tbilisi) to Marfa Ivanovna and Nikolai Pavlovich Lisitsian. On her father's side, she was a cousin of the opera singer Paval Lisitsian. Lisitsian's father died when she was nine years old, leaving her mother to raise her daughter on her own.

In 1939, Lisitsian attended the acting department of the Tbilisi Theatre University, and in 1941, she was moved to the Moscow City Theatre School, where she completed her studies from 1944 to 1946. When the Great Patriotic War broke out in 1941, Listisian requested to Аlexander Shelepin at the Moscow City Committee of the Komsomol to be sent to the front. She was then assigned to a special-purpose reconnaissance and sabotage unit on the Western Front, sent behind enemy lines, and was captured. She managed to escape the concentration camp in Ukraine and joined a partisan group, taking part in combat operations. During one such operation, Lisitsian received a concussion and was hospitalised.

After the end of the war, Lisitsian married Luigi Longo, the son and namesake of one of the leaders in the Italian Communist Party whom she met in Georgia in 1938. They lived in Italy for several years, with Lisitsian working as the head of the editing department at the representative office of Sovexportfilm. In 1952, Lisitsian returned to the USSR with her husband and son Sandro, studied at the directing department of GITIS, and in 1954, under Vsevolod Pudovkin's advice, she moved to Grigori Kozintsev's directing workshop at VGIK, where she graduated there in 1959.

As her diploma work, in 1959, Lisitsian directed her first full-length film based on Sergey Mikhalkov's children's story Sombrero (Russian: Сомбреро). During her internship at Мosfilm, Lisitsian met her second husband, camera operator Viktor Listopadov. After receiving a distribution to Mosfilm, Lisitsian began to dub foreign films, and restoring old films such as Peter the Great, Peasants (Russian: Крестьяне), Pepo, Тractor Drivers, and Encounter at the Elbe. She was initially selected to direct the 1964 film Tale About the Lost Time, only to be dropped by the studio's management in favor of Аleksandr Ptushko. During the 1970s and 1980s, Lisitian directed several more feature films in the USSR, as well as writing stories in issues of Almanac of Film Travels (Russian: Альманаха кинопутешествий).

In 1997 in Italy, and in 2002 and 2005 in Russia, Lisitsian published her autobiographical book War Broke Us... (Russian: Нас ломала война…).

She was a member of the Communist Party of the USSR from around 1958, while also part of the Association of Filmmakers of the USSR in Moscow.

Lisitsian died on 29 November 2009 in Moscow, and was buried at Vagankovo Cemetery.

== Filmography ==
- 1959 — Sombrero
- 1961 — Cosmonaut No… (short)
- 1963 — USSR through the eyes of Italians / New in the East (collaborated with Romolo Marcellini and Leonardo Cortese)
- 1969 — Your Paw, Bear! (stereoscopic)
- 1973 — Chipollino
- 1977 — The Miracle Voice of Gelsomino
- 1981 — On the Garnet Islands
- 1983 — The Secret of Villa Greta
- 1987 — The Mysterious Heir
- 1991 — Meeting with the Doukhobors of Canada

Works written for Fitil

- 1965 — "Treachery and Love" (Russian: Коварство и любовь; № 42)
- 1968 — "Cleaned Out" (Russian: Обчистили; № 72)

== Bibliography ==
- Lisitsian, Tamara (2002). Нас ломала война… [The war broke us...] (in Russian). Olma Media Group. ISBN 5-224-03666-6.

== Awards ==
- Order of the Patriotic War (6 April 1985)
- Medal "For Courage" (6 May 1994)
- Honored Artist of the RSFSR (1985)
