= History of television in Germany =

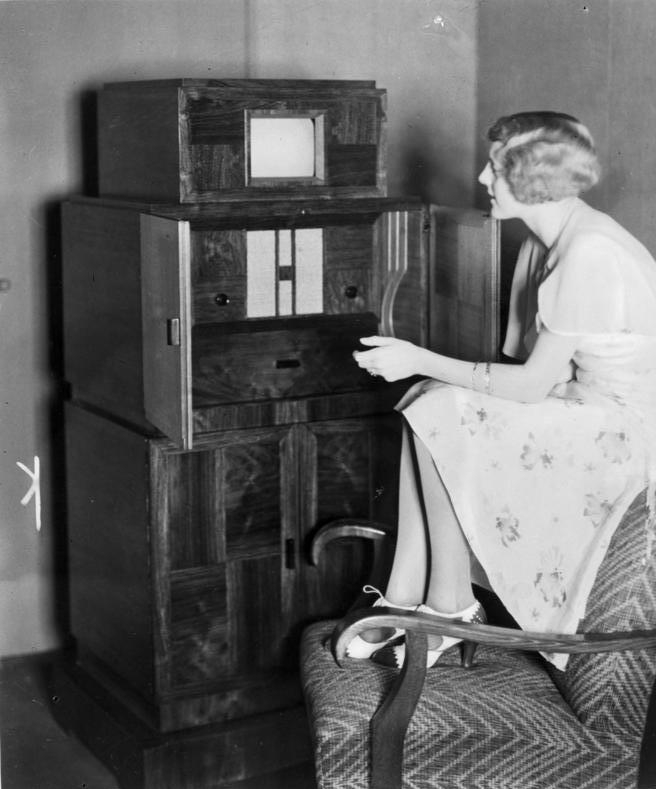
Telefunken receiver from 1933

The first regular electronic television service in Germany began in Berlin on March 22, 1935, as Deutscher Fernseh Rundfunk. Broadcasting from the Fernsehsender Paul Nipkow, it used a 180-line system, and was on air for 90 minutes, three times a week. Very few receivers were ever privately owned, and viewers went instead to Fernsehstuben (television parlors). During the 1936 Summer Olympics, broadcasts, up to eight hours a day, took place in Berlin and Hamburg. The Nazis intended to use television as a medium for their propaganda once the number of television sets was increased, but television was able initially to reach only a small number of viewers, in contrast to radio. Despite many technical improvements to camera technology, allowing for higher resolution imaging, by 1939, and the start of World War II, plans for an expansion of television programming were soon changed in favor of radio. The production of the TV receiver E1, that had just started was cancelled because of the war. Nevertheless, the Berlin station, along with one in occupied Paris (Fernsehsender Paris), remained on the air for most of World War II. A special magazine called Fernsehen und Tonfilm (i.e. Television and Sound film) was published.

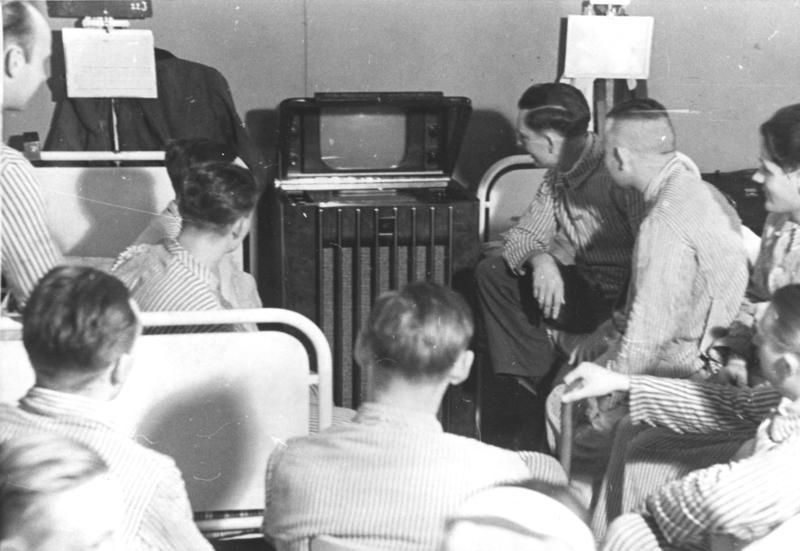
Experimental colour television receiver showing a football broadcast in a military hospital in 1942. It would become a development of the later PAL-SECAM system.

In 1941 Kurt Wagenführ established the "Institute for Broadcasting Studies and Television" ("Institut für Rundfunkkunde und Fernsehrundfunk") at the University of Berlin with support from the Reich Ministry of Public Enlightenment and Propaganda.

== 1950s ==
After World War II, it took several years to resume television transmissions. Immediately after the war, newspapers and radio were the only available mass media and they were under direct control of the Allied government, and were more likely to be in English or French than in German. In the West, the United States, the United Kingdom and France had founded the ARD, the Arbeitsgemeinschaft der öffentlich-rechtlichen Rundfunkanstalten Deutschlands (Cooperative association of the public broadcasters in Germany). In the East, the Soviet Union founded its own radio and later TV stations, known as Deutscher Fernsehfunk (DFF). Many parts of Germany (particularly the GDR) received programming from both services.

The common aim of the Western Allies was to prevent the future abuse of broadcasting by the German government. Thus, the different regional networks were placed under the control of the West German Länder governments. Even so, these services tended to reflect the broadcast practices of the occupying Allies. Thus, NWDR, set up in the British occupation zone, reflected the attitudes of the BBC; the four services set up in the American zone (BR, HR, SDR and Radio Bremen) adopted American-style practices from the Armed Forces Network; and Südwestfunk, in the French zone, tended to be more French than German in its practices.

In 1948 the British occupation forces authorized NWDR to make plans to broadcast television programs for the British zone, with the first signals sent on July 12, 1950. A general test phase started on September 25, 1950. This initial service lasted two hours a night (transmitting 8–10 p.m.) and included news, variety shows, films, and television plays. In 1951 additional programs for women and children were added in the afternoon. Daily broadcasts began on Christmas Day of 1952.

Other regional networks also started to launch television in their own areas; HR and SWF in June 1953, and BR and SDR in November 1954. The companies in the American occupation zone were more determined to promote TV as a "window to the world", rather than mere "pictured radio", an attitude NWDR shared with its role model, the BBC. The BR, HR, and SDR were the German regionals that introduced American program techniques to Germany; they were the first to dub American material into German and, in 1956, when they felt they were ready, they were the first to introduce a few minutes of commercials, presented in the early evening.

Meanwhile, the GDR was launching its own television service, based on the Soviet model. As in the West, there was a test phase, begun on June 3, 1952, with regular programming officially started on March 3, 1956.

In the early days, few West Germans and even fewer East Germans owned a TV set. Most Germans still preferred to go to the movies. One of the events that enhanced the popularity of TV among the West Germans was the broadcast of the 1954 football world cup finals from Bern, which many followed on TV screens in shop windows; another was the coronation of Queen Elizabeth II a year before.

In 1954 a regular schedule began through the cooperation of all ARD members. During this time the basic television genres in the central areas of entertainment, information and enlightenment were established, and television plays were developed as the medium's own specific art form.

Improvements in technology and programming, as well as reduced prices, led to a steady increase in license holders, and the number of licenses passed 1 million in October 1957.

This success and new, unused frequencies motivated West German chancellor Konrad Adenauer to increase his influence by opening a second channel called Das Freie Deutsche Fernsehen (The Free German Television), to be financed by the industry with the central goal of presenting government opinions. But the Länder (states) fiercely objected to these activities, and they were finally stopped by a court order in 1961.

NWDR had initially been awarded service of West Berlin simply because its main transmitter was in the British sector of that city. However, the East German uprisings in the summer of 1953 brought about the need for West Berlin to have its own ARD member station. Accordingly, Sender Freies Berlin (SFB) was established on June 1, 1954, independent of NWDR. Since SFB was serving a city under joint allied occupation, it had to combine the broadcasting practices of all three occupying countries. In so doing, SFB established the basic standard of the ARD network.

At about this time complaints arose from the state of North Rhine-Westphalia, which objected to Hamburg having too much control over West German programming, especially as North Rhine-Westphalia had more people than the other three NWDR Länder combined. So on January 1, 1956, the NWDR was split into WDR, based in Cologne, and NDR, which continued out of Hamburg. However, they continued to carry a common television program until 1961.

The basic ARD network was completed in 1959 when SR and Radio Bremen opened their own television services.

== 1960s–1970s ==
In the 1960s West German television came into its own. In the early part of the decade, some of the larger ARD companies started to further regionalize themselves by launching branch stations. NDR opened branches in Hanover (for Lower Saxony) and Kiel (for Schleswig-Holstein); WDR operated a sub-channel in Bonn (for the North Rhine) and another in Dortmund (for Westphalia); HR opened a branch in Kassel; SDR in Mannheim; and BR in Nuremberg. These opt-out branches diverged from the main stations to present specific local programs for the branch areas, generally for an hour daily.

Then, on April 1, 1963, the long-promised second TV network, the Zweites Deutsches Fernsehen (Second German Television) started. Unlike ARD, which was regionalized and had its roots in radio, ZDF was a centrally organized channel devoted solely to television. According to a decision by the lander governments, programming had to be planned in cooperation with the ARD, with the aim of presenting contrasting elements of the two services, i. e., they had to refrain from broadcasting programs of the same genre against one another. Nevertheless, the well-established ARD perceived the upstart ZDF as a competitor and reacted by beefing up its news coverage. The ZDF did not yet have enough journalists to reach ARD's news standards, so it concentrated on entertainment in order to gain a larger audience.

In 1967, vice chancellor Willy Brandt started the era of color TV in West Germany during a live broadcast. Also, beginning in 1964, several member networks of the ARD started broadcasting third television programs, known colloquially as Die Dritten (The Third Networks). There were five of them, from North to South:

- Nord 3 (shared by NDR, SFB and Radio Bremen), opened on January 4, 1965.
- West 3 (WDR), opened December 17, 1965.
- Hessen 3 (HR), opened October 5, 1964.
- Bayern 3 (BR), opened September 22, 1964.
- Südwest 3 (shared by SDR, SWF and SR), opened April 5, 1969.

These channels were devoted to educational and cultural programs as well as local information.

In 1969 East Germany started DFF2, and introduced color programming on both channels. In 1972, the DFF was renamed, dropping the pretense of being an all-German service and becoming Fernsehen der DDR (GDR Television) or DDR-FS. Its two channels became known as DDR1 and DDR2.

The introduction of color television also meant the correction of the weather map on both national networks at the end of their news bulletins, as it showed Weimar-era borders or the word "DEUTSCHLAND" over both Germanies and Poland (the latter of which even objected the decision). Country names and border designations were removed in 1970.

At the time of the introduction in 1967, West Germany had just under 6,000 color TV sets - which at the time cost roughly 2,000-4,000 DM (~5,000-10,000 euros today), without the option of installment purchase. Color broadcasting was at first limited to about 4 hours/day, full time broadcasting began only in 1970. At first, consumers were still skeptical of the color TV, but as West Germany would host both the 1972 Summer Olympics and the 1974 FIFA World Cup, it quickly provided a strong incentive to buy color TVs.

== 1980s ==
Until the early 1980s, the average West German TV viewer could choose only between usually three TV channels, financed through license fees. In regions bordering neighboring countries, however, viewers were typically also able to get foreign stations via antenna, e.g. those being broadcast from East Germany or the Netherlands. Before the advent of privately owned television networks, domestic stations usually broadcast from the early morning hours until about 2 to 3 am, interrupted by often over two hours of early-afternoon intermission. In Western Germany this changed in 1984, as the first two privately financed TV networks, RTL plus (short for Radio Television Luxemburg) and SAT 1, started their programming (previously RTL had transmitted from Luxembourg into southwestern Germany). In contrast to ARD and ZDF, these new stations were only able to show their programs in the bigger cities via satellite or via cable; additionally, in some urban agglomerations like the Greater Hanover area, they could be picked up by antenna. But as the new stations introduced some very different kinds of programs (especially RTL plus, which in its first years was known for its unconventional afternoon quiz shows and late-evening erotic films), their popularity increased and more people invested in broadband cable access or satellite antennas.

== 1990s–2000s ==
After reunification, the TV stations of the German Democratic Republic were dissolved and the remnants were used to found new regional networks, e.g. the Mitteldeutscher Rundfunk (Central German Broadcasting), as part of the ARD. In addition, more private TV stations opened, becoming available through cable, satellite, and in some cases, over the airwaves.

As the millennium approached, Germany began airing new channels. The early private programmes (RTL and Sat 1) gained a large stake in viewer ratings, others like Kabel 1, ProSieben, RTL II, and VOX got smaller shares. The normal ratings chain is: ARD, RTL, ZDF, Sat1. RTL and ProSieben started buying international television series, mainly from the United States (like Friends, ALF, The Simpsons, Smallville, Grey's Anatomy). ARD and ZDF continued to produce more of their own content by investing in their own production companies and buying less international shows. In contrast, ARD and ZDF exported some show concepts to the US, UK and China; for example "Wetten, dass..?", and some of their shows are selling worldwide, e.g. Derrick. In 2004, a German law (Rundfunkstaatsvertrag) required channels to switch from analogue signals to digital signals by 2010. Many regions can already receive the digital signals like Berlin, Lower-Saxony or the Ruhr valley. The programme diversity is by far the largest in Europe; with Germany being in the middle of Europe it can receive satellite channels like BBC World News, TVE, Al-Jazeera, RAI, TF1, CNBC Europe and other pan-European or Asian-African channels.

== See also ==
- Television in Germany
- Fernsehsender Paul Nipkow was a television station in Germany (1933–1945)
