= Katerina Izmailova (film) =

1966 film

Katerina Izmailova (Катерина Измайлова)
- Directed by: Mikhail Shapiro
- Written by: Alexander Preys; Dmitri Shostakovich; Nikolai Leskov (story)
- Starring: Galina Vishnevskaya
- Cinematography: Rostislav Davydov; Vladimir Ponomaryov
- Music by: Dmitri Shostakovich
- Production company: Lenfilm
- Release date: 1966
- Running time: 116 minutes
- Country: Soviet Union
- Language: Russian

Katerina Izmailova (Russian: Катерина Измайлова) is a 1966 Soviet film adaptation of Dmitri Shostakovich's opera Lady Macbeth of the Mtsensk District, directed by Mikhail Shapiro. It was entered into the 1967 Cannes Film Festival.

== Plot ==
In late 19th century Russia, Katerina Lvovna Izmailova, the wife of a wealthy merchant, conspires with her lover to murder her husband and father-in-law. Their crime is uncovered, and they are sent to a penal colony. During the journey, Katerina's lover, Sergei, turns his affections to another woman. Unable to bear his betrayal, Katerina kills her rival at the cost of her own life.

== Cast ==
- Galina Vishnevskaya as Katerina Lvovna Izmailova
- Artyom Inozemtsev as Sergei
- Nikolai Boyarsky as Zinovi Borisovich
- Aleksandr Sokolov as Boris Timofeyevich
- Roman Tkachuk as Village Drunk
- Tatyana Gavrilova as Sonetka
- Konstantin Adashevsky as pop
- Igor Bogolyubov as policeman
- Lyubov Malinovskaya as old convict woman
- Vyacheslav Radziyevsky as Voice of Zinovi Borisovich
- Valentina Reka as Voice of Sonetka
- Vera Titova as Aksinya
- Konstantin Tyagunov as episode
- Alexander Vedernikov as Voice of Boris Timofeyevich
