= John Westbrook (actor) =

English actor (1922–1989)

Westbrook in The Tomb of Ligeia (1964)

John Aubrey Westbrook (1 November 1922 – 16 June 1989) was an English actor.

== Life and career ==
Born in Teignmouth, Devon, John Westbrook worked mainly in theatre and in radio. He also made occasional film and television appearances. His most famous role was as Christopher Gough in Roger Corman's The Tomb of Ligeia. Noted for his deep, mellifluous voice, he also recorded radio plays and audiobooks, and provided the role of Treebeard in the 1978 animated adaptation of The Lord of the Rings. Westbrook also recorded the spoken roles in the choral/orchestral works An Oxford Elegy by Ralph Vaughan Williams and Morning Heroes by Arthur Bliss, as well as the role of the Narrator in Oedipus Rex by Stravinsky, conducted by the composer.

He performed in a great many Shakespeare plays, which included the title part in Richard II at the Citizens', Glasgow in 1956, Morocco and the Duke of Venice in The Merchant of Venice for BBC Television in 1955, Theseus in A Midsummer Night's Dream for BBC Television in 1958 and Prospero in The Tempest for the Bristol Old Vic in 1960. On radio he played Cassio in Othello, Fortinbras and later The Ghost in Hamlet, Banquo in Macbeth etc.

Also for BBC Radio he was a remarkably fine Jesus in the last revival of Dorothy L. Sayers's The Man Born to Be King. This production has been repeated over a long period, most recently at Christmas 2008 on BBC Radio 7. He also portrayed Jesus in festival theatre productions such as the York Mystery Plays, and much other work with a religious theme such as his Becket in Murder in the Cathedral. Comparatively rare London appearances included The River Line at what was then the Strand Theatre in 1952.

Television work included playing the historical roles of James II in the 1969 BBC miniseries The First Churchills, and Lord Blandford in the 1974 Thames miniseries Jennie: Lady Randolph Churchill.

He appeared in poetry recitals all over the UK, including his own solo programme The Ruling Passion.

Westbrook died in Ridgewell, Halstead, Essex on 16 June 1989, aged 66.

== Filmography ==
| Year | Title | Role | Notes |
|---|---|---|---|
| 1951 | There Is Another Sun | Detective | |
| 1959 | Room at the Top | Jack Wales | |
| 1960 | Foxhole in Cairo | Roger | |
| 1962 | A Prize of Arms | Capt. Stafford | |
| 1964 | The Masque of the Red Death | The Red Death | Uncredited |
| 1964 | The Tomb of Ligeia | Christopher Gough | |
| 1974 | Doctor Watson and the Darkwater Hall Mystery | Bradshaw | |
| 1978 | The Lord of the Rings | Treebeard - Ent Leader / Lord Celeborn of Lothlorien | Voice |
| 1980 | North Sea Hijack | Dawnay | |
