= Sie kannten sich alle =

1958 film

- Directed by: Richard Groschopp
- Release date: 1958
- Country: East Germany
- Language: German

Sie kannten sich alle is an East German film. It was released in 1958.
