= Die goldene Gans =

1964 film

- Directed by: Siegfried Hartmann
- Written by: Siegfried Hartmann; Günter Kaltofen
- Starring: Kaspar Eichel; Uwe-Detlev Jessen; Peter Dommisch; Gerd E. Schäfer; Katharina Lind
- Cinematography: Karl Plintzer
- Edited by: Hildegard Conrad
- Music by: Siegfried Bethmann
- Distributed by: DEFA
- Release date: 1964
- Running time: 63 minutes
- Country: East Germany
- Language: German

Die goldene Gans is an East German film, based on the fairy tale Golden Goose. It was released in 1964.
