= The City of Masters =

1965 film directed by Vladimir Bychko

- Russian: Город мастеров
- Directed by: Vladimir Bychkov
- Written by: Nikolai Erdman; Tamara Gabbe
- Starring: Georgi Lapeto; Marianna Vertinskaya; Lev Lemke; Pavel Shpringfeld; Savely Kramarov
- Cinematography: Mikhail Ardabyevsky; Alexander Knyazhinsky
- Edited by: Vera Kolyadenko
- Music by: Oleg Karavaychuk
- Production company: Belarusfilm
- Release date: 1965
- Country: Byelorussian SSR
- Language: Russian

The City of Masters (Russian: Город мастеров) is a 1965 Belarusian Soviet fantasy adventure film directed by Vladimir Bychkov based on a children's fantasy play (Note: Gabbe's play was described as fairy tale, because at these times there was no genre of fantasy in Soviet classification) with the same name by Tamara Gabbe.

== Plot ==
The film takes place in a free city in medieval Europe populated by cheerful artisans and craftsmen, who suddenly find themselves enslaved by a malevolent Duke de Malicorn. But not for long. A group of the city dwellers escape into forests and begin to fight for liberation. The plot involves a love storyline.

== Cast ==
=== Leading ===
- Georgi Lapeto as Karakol' the humpback, the hero; voice actor: Igor Yasulovich
- Marianna Vertinskaya as Veronika, Karakol's sweetheart
- Lev Lemke as Duke de Malikorn, the invader
- Savely Kramarov as Klik-Klyak, son of city mayor, enamored with Veronika, traitor; voice: Georgy Shtil

=== Supporting ===
- Pavel Shpringfeld as Musharon, city mayor, appointed by the invaders
- Yelizaveta Uvarova as granny Tafaro, fortune-teller, who predicts that Karakol will free the city and marry Veronika
- Roman Filippov, baron (not in the play)
- Vasiliy Bychkov as Timolle (as Vasya Buchkov)
- Zinovy Gerdt as an artist
- Igor Yasulovich as Gwen (Firen Jr. in the play), brother of Veronika
