= Der Teufelskreis =

1956 film

- Directed by: Carl Balhaus
- Release date: 1956
- Country: East Germany
- Language: German

Der Teufelskreis is an East German film about the Reichstag fire trial. It was released in 1956.
