= Tony Bilbow =

British television interviewer, film expert and writer (born 1928)

- Born: Antony Bilbow; 17 April 1928 (age 98); Eton, Buckinghamshire, England
- Occupations: Television presenter and screenwriter

Antony Bilbow (born 17 April 1928) is a British television interviewer, film expert and writer. He was a presenter of the BBC's Late Night Line-Up discussion programme which was broadcast on BBC2 between 1964 and 1972.

Bilbow's father was an architect. He was educated at the City of London School, Blackfriars, and began writing short stories for the BBC; he was then the anchorman for Day By Day on Southern Television. He was a screenwriter for the 1970s situation comedy Please Sir! and the spin-off series The Fenn Street Gang and in 1986 was a writer for the BBC soap opera EastEnders. From 1970 to 1973, he presented the film programme Film Night, on which his interviewees included David Niven and Alfred Hitchcock.

In Series 2 Episode 5 of Rutland Weekend Television, Bilbow stars throughout as himself and shows how well he could participate in Pythonesque comedy material.

Bilbow narrated the English voiceover for the BBC three-part series of the cult East German film The Singing Ringing Tree.

== Bibliography ==
- Bilbow, Tony (1974). The Adventures of Jungle Ted and the Laceybuttonpoppers. Imprint unknown. ISBN 0903925176.
- Bilbow, Tony (1995). Lights, Camera, Action!: A Century of the Cinema. London: Little Brown. ISBN 0-316-87595-3.
- Bilbow, Tony (2013). Head Rat. ISBN 1493514954.
