= 4979 Otawara =

Main-belt asteroid

Discovery
- Discovered by: K. W. Reinmuth
- Discovery site: Heidelberg-Königstuhl State Observatory
- Discovery date: 2 August 1949

Designations
- MPC designation: (4979) Otawara
- Named after: Akira Otawara
- Alternative designations: 1949 PQ · 1977 DW_{10} · 1978 TY_{5} · 1978 SW_{4}
- Minor planet category: main belt

Orbital characteristics
- Epoch 5 May 2025 (JD 2460800.5)
- Uncertainty parameter 0
- Observation arc: 27736 days (75.94 yr)
- Aphelion: 2.483 AU
- Perihelion: 1.852 AU
- Semi-major axis: 2.167 AU
- Eccentricity: 0.1453
- Orbital period (sidereal): 3.191 yr (1166 d)
- Mean anomaly: 298.626°
- Mean motion: 0° 18^{m} 32.04^{s} / day
- Inclination: 0.9092°
- Longitude of ascending node: 69.799°
- Argument of perihelion: 206.956°
- Earth MOID: 0.8363 AU
- Jupiter MOID: 2.6125 AU
- T_{Jupiter}: 3.677

Physical characteristics
- Dimensions: ~3.204 km (JPL); 2.6–4.0 km (Doressoundiram et al. 1999) (Note: Doressoundiram et al. (1999) estimated Otawara's circular effective radii as 2.0 km for an S-type albedo and 1.3 km for a V-type albedo. JPL gives a value of 3.204 km for Otawara's diameter.)
- Mean density: ≥1.9 g/cm^{3} (Note: Assuming Otawara is a rubble pile asteroid.)
- Synodic rotation period: 2.707±0.005 h
- Pole ecliptic longitude: 50±5° or 230±5°
- Pole ecliptic latitude: −30±16°
- Spectral type: S-type
- Absolute magnitude (H): 14.43 (JPL)

4979 Otawara (provisional designation: 1949 PQ) is a small, rapidly rotating asteroid orbiting in the main asteroid belt. Discovered in 1949, the asteroid was named after Japanese photo artist and writer Akira Otawara. It is stony in composition, consisting of olivine and pyroxenes, and is estimated to be around 2–4 kilometres (1.2–2.5 mi) in size. The asteroid was one of three originally planned targets for the Rosetta mission, but launch delays meant that it was abandoned.

== Discovery and naming ==
Otawara was discovered on 2 August 1949 by German astronomer Karl Wilhelm Reinmuth at Heidelberg-Königstuhl State Observatory in Heidelberg, Baden-Württemberg, Germany. It was given the provisional designation 1949 PQ, and on 21 November 1991 it was numbered 4979 by the Minor Planet Center. The asteroid was named after Akira Otawara, a photo artist and writer. Together with astronomer Shuichi Nakano, he published two catalogs in 1983, Field Star Map 2000 and Star & Planet Catalogue 2000. Nakano proposed the name Otawara for the object; the name was published in Minor Planet Circular 22505 on 1 September 1993.

== Orbit ==
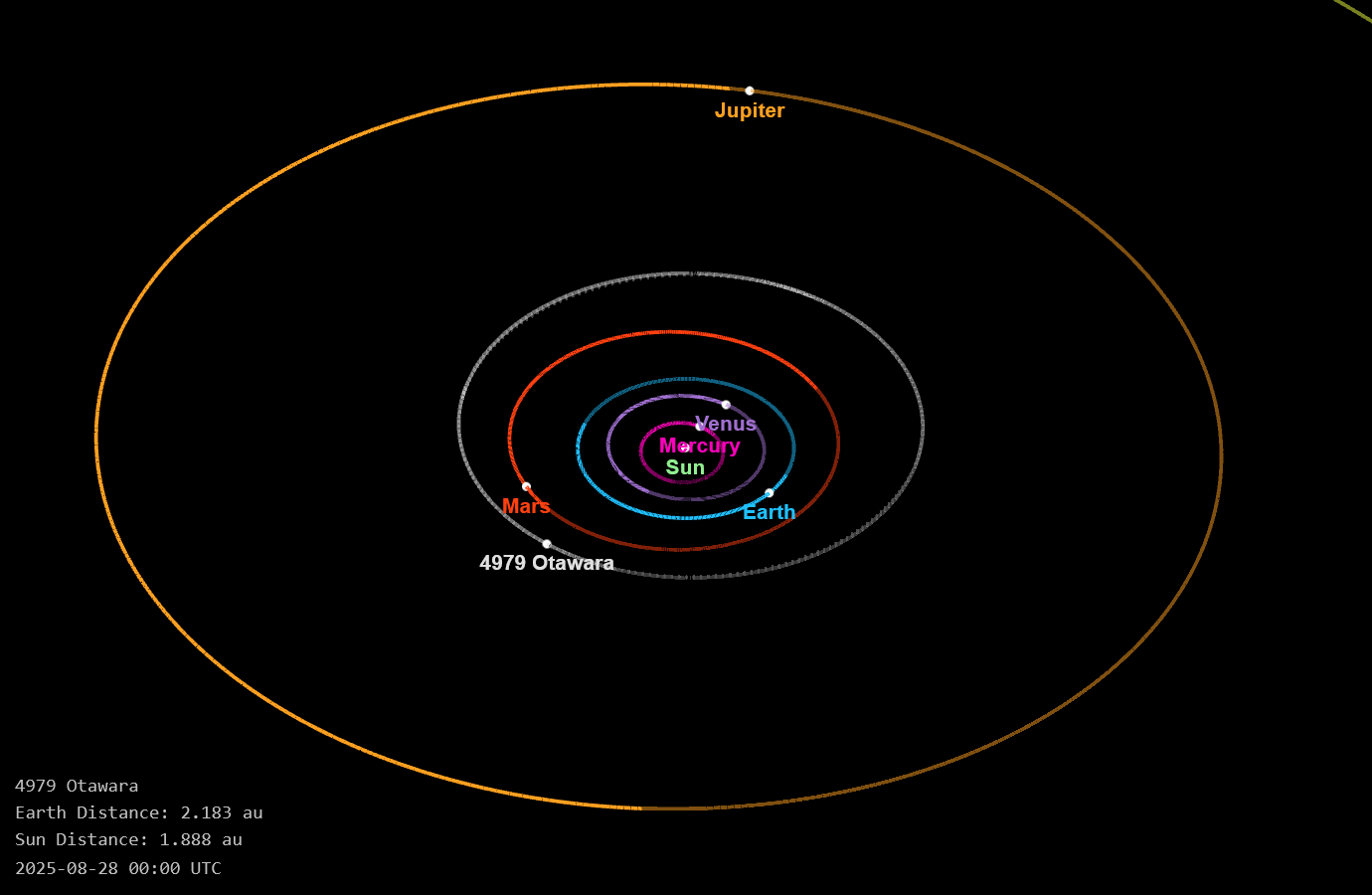
A diagram of 4979 Otawara's orbit, with the orbits of the inner planets and Jupiter shown.

Otawara orbits with a semi-major axis of 2.17 astronomical units (AU); it is located in the main asteroid belt. It has a moderate orbital eccentricity of 0.15. Along its 3.19 year (1166 day) orbit, its distance from the Sun varies from 1.85 AU at perihelion to 2.48 AU at aphelion. Its orbit is closely aligned with the plane of the planets, with an orbital inclination of 0.91° with respect to the ecliptic plane.

== Physical characteristics ==
Otawara is a small asteroid; estimates of its size range around 2–4 kilometres (1.2–2.5 mi). Otawara's lightcurve, or variations in its observed apparent brightness, suggests that it is elongated, with an a/b axis ratio of 1.21±0.05. Initial analysis of Otawara's spectrum in 1999, conducted by a team of astronomers led by Alain Doressoundiram, was ambiguous on what asteroid taxonomic class it belonged to. Its spectrum was consistent with either an S-type asteroid rich in silicate minerals, a V-type asteroid associated with 4 Vesta, or an SV-type asteroid, with characteristics intermediate of the two. However, later analysis by a team led by Sonia Fornasier ruled out a V-type classification, and concluded that Otawara is an S-class asteroid rich in olivine and pyroxenes. Under the Gaffey classification scheme, Otawara belongs to the S(IV) subclass. S(IV) asteroids are probable candidates for parent bodies of ordinary chondrite meteorites; Otawara's spectral similarity to these meteorites suggests it is not differentiated. Otawara's density is constrained to be ≥1.9 g/cm^{3}, although this is not valid if it is a solid object instead of a rubble pile.

Analysis of Otawara's lightcurve suggests it rotates rapidly, with a rotation period of 2.707±0.005 hours, classifying it as a fast rotating asteroid. Its rotation appears to be retrograde—rotating clockwise—with its north pole pointed towards the ecliptic south.

== Exploration ==
Otawara, along with 140 Siwa, was planned as a flyby target for the European Space Agency's Rosetta spacecraft mission on its way to comet 46P/Wirtanen. Expected to encounter Otawara on 11 July 2006, Rosetta would have been able to image most of its surface due to its rotation. Rosetta would have been unable to measure Otawara's mass due to its small size and the spacecraft's flyby distance. Rosetta was originally set to launch in January 2003, but the failure of an Ariane 5 rocket postponed the spacecraft's launch and forced the ESA to find new targets. Rosetta eventually launched successfully in 2004, visiting the main belt asteroids 2867 Šteins and 21 Lutetia before arriving at its newly selected primary target 67P/Churyumov–Gerasimenko.
