= Henrich Mayorov =

Russian-Ukrainian choreographer and ballet dancer (1936–2022)

Henrikh Mayorov
- Born: 1936-09-06; Ulan-Ude, Russian SFSR, Soviet Union
- Died: 2022
- Education: Kyiv Choreographic School; Leningrad Conservatory
- Occupations: Ballet dancer, choreographer
- Known for: Ballet Chipollino
- Awards: USSR State Prize (1976)

Henrich Aleksandrovich Mayorov (Russian: Гeнрих Александрович Майоров; 6 September 1936 – 3 April 2022) was a Russian-Ukrainian choreographer, ballet dancer, and artistic director whose work played a significant role in the development of narrative ballet in the late Soviet period. He was a laureate of the USSR State Prize (1976) and was awarded the honorary titles of Honoured Artist of the Russian Federation and Honoured Artist of the Republic of Buryatia.

== Biography ==
Mayorov was born on 6 September 1936 in Ulan-Ude, in Eastern Siberia. In 1957, he graduated from the Kyiv Choreographic School, completing his formal ballet training far from his native region.

Between 1967 and 1972, Mayorov studied at the choreographic department of the Leningrad Conservatory, where he trained as a ballet master under the guidance of Igor Belsky, one of the leading Soviet choreographers of the period.

== Performing career ==
Following his graduation from the Kyiv Choreographic School, Mayorov began his professional career as a ballet dancer. From 1957 to 1960, he was a soloist with the Lviv Theatre of Opera and Ballet, after which he joined the Kyiv Opera and Ballet Theatre, where he performed from 1960 to 1967.

Although his early career was rooted in performance, by the late 1960s Mayorov increasingly shifted toward choreography and theatrical direction, a transition formalized by his studies at the Leningrad Conservatory.

== Choreographic and leadership work ==
From 1972 onward, choreography became Mayorov’s primary professional focus. He served in several senior artistic positions across major Soviet ballet institutions, including as ballet master and later chief ballet master of the Kyiv Opera and Ballet Theatre, artistic director and chief choreographer of the Belarusian State Dance Ensemble, and ballet master of the Stanislavski and Nemirovich-Danchenko Theatre.

In addition to his theatre work, Mayorov held leadership roles in ballet education. From the late 1980s onward, he was affiliated with the Moscow State Academy of Choreography, serving as deputy head of the choreography department and later as artistic director during multiple terms in the 1990s and 2000s.

Over the course of his career, Mayorov staged more than 30 ballet productions in theatres across Russia, Ukraine, Belarus, Moldova, Lithuania, and Croatia. His repertoire included both classical reinterpretations and original narrative ballets, with a particular emphasis on works intended for younger audiences.

== Major works and awards ==
Mayorov is especially associated with the ballet Chipollino, which became one of the most enduring children’s ballets of the late Soviet era and has remained in the repertoire of major Russian theatres, including the Bolshoi Theatre, for decades.

For his choreography of Chipollino, Mayorov received the USSR State Prize in 1976, one of the highest artistic distinctions in the Soviet Union. His other notable ballets include Snow White and the Seven Dwarfs, The Little Prince, Scarlet Sails, and The Heavenly Swan Maiden, works that contributed to his reputation as a leading creator of narrative and family-oriented ballet productions.

Mayorov was also awarded first prize at the All-Union Competition of Ballet Dancers and Choreographers in 1972 and received a choreographic prize at the Fifth International Ballet Competition in Varna.

== Teaching and legacy ==
Alongside his choreographic output, Mayorov was widely respected as a pedagogue and mentor. Generations of dancers passed through productions he staged or institutions he led, and he was known for combining formal discipline with an accessible teaching style.

Despite the institutional changes that followed the dissolution of the Soviet Union, Mayorov continued to work actively in Russian ballet during the 1990s and 2000s, maintaining professional ties with regional theatres, including those in his native Buryatia.

== Death ==
Mayorov died on 3 April 2022 at the age of 85.
