= Leningrad Symphony (film) =

1957 film

- Russian: Ленинградская симфония
- Directed by: Zakhar Agranenko
- Written by: Zakhar Agranenko
- Produced by: D. Tambiyeva
- Starring: Vladimir Solovyov; Mark Pertsovsky; Olga Malko; Yelena Stroyeva; Nikolay Kryuchkov
- Cinematography: Emil Gulidov
- Edited by: Tatyana Likhachyova
- Music by: Veniamin Basner; Dmitri Shostakovich
- Production company: Mosfilm
- Release date: 1957
- Running time: 92 minutes
- Country: Soviet Union
- Language: Russian

Leningrad Symphony (Russian: Ленинградская симфония, romanized: Leningradskaya simfoniya) is a 1957 war drama film directed by Zakhar Agranenko.

== Plot ==
In the summer of 1942, Shostakovich's Seventh Symphony was brought to the Radio House, but the orchestra didn't have enough musicians to perform it. However, on August 9, when Hitler planned to seize Leningrad, people heard the Symphony live. This film is a depiction of the events leading up to the day of the historic performance, which was broadcast nationwide all over the Soviet Union on radio, and led up to the smash success of the work at home and abroad.

== Cast ==
- Vladimir Solovyov as Loginov
- Mark Pertsovsky as Orest Dobroselsky
- Olga Malko as Valentina Orlova
- Yelena Stroyeva as Dr. Nadezhda Volkova
- Nikolay Kryuchkov as Maj. Polyakov
- Zhanna Sukhopolskaya as Nina Sergeyevna
- Maksim Shtraukh as Professor Baghdasarov
- Robert Bushkov as Aleksandr Volkov
- Mikhail Tumanishvili as Roashkin
- Yuri Krotenko as Solovyov
- Vladimir Damsky as Tutrovsky
- Sergei Kurilov as Commander Pavel Grigorievich Orlov
- Alla Demidova as student
- Stanislav Lyubshin as student
- Fyodor Nikitin as episode
- Zoya Fyodorova as episode
- Yulian Panich as episode
- Sergey Filippov as episode
- Veronika Buzhinskaya as episode

== See also ==
- Siege of Leningrad
- Symphony No. 7 (Shostakovich)
