= Ichthyander (disambiguation) =

Ichthyander may refer to:

- Ichthyander, the name of the main character in Amphibian Man, a Russian science fiction adventure published in 1928
  - Also in Amphibian Man (film) (1962)
- Ichthyander Project, the first Soviet underwater habitat, in the 1960s, initiated by the Ichthyander diving club
