= Yevgeny Zamyatin =

Russian author (1884–1937)

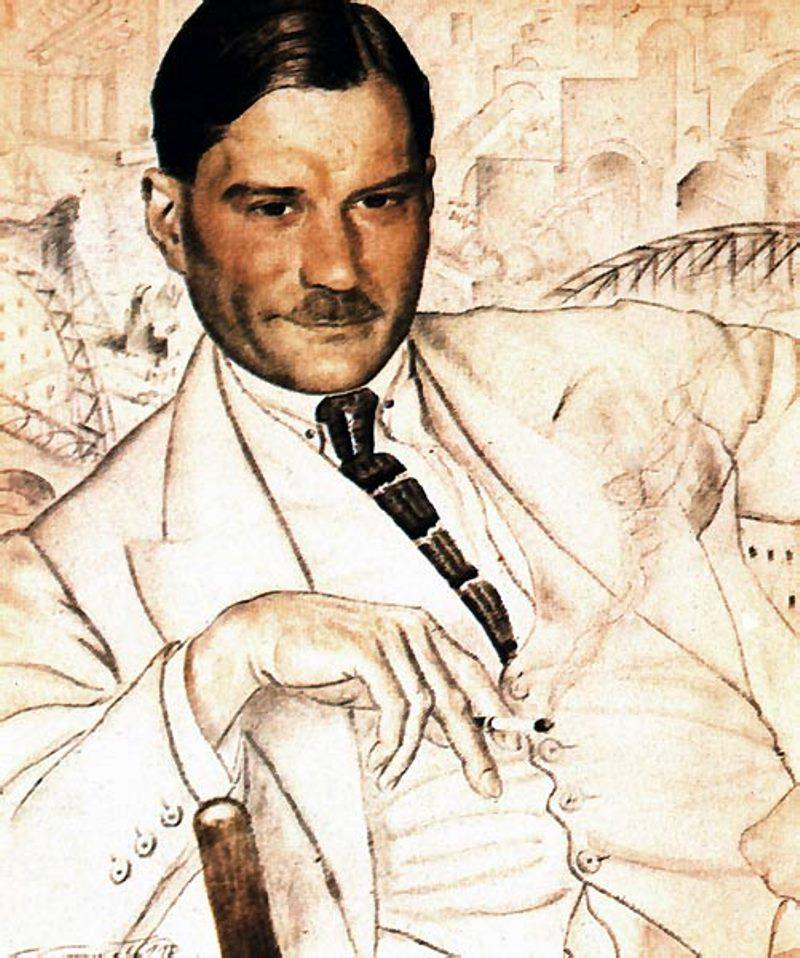
- Yevgeny Zamyatin by Boris Kustodiev (1923).
- Born: Yevgeny Ivanovich Zamyatin; 1 February 1884; Lebedyan, Russian Empire
- Died: 10 March 1937 (aged 53); Paris, France
- Occupations: Novelist, journalist, naval engineer
- Writing career
- Genres: Science fiction, satire
- Notable work: We
- Movements: Modernism; Surrealism; Magic realism

Yevgeny Ivanovich Zamyatin (Note: His last name is often transliterated as Zamiatin or Zamjatin.) (Russian: Евге́ний Ива́нович Замя́тин, IPA: [jɪvˈɡʲenʲɪj ɪˈvanəvʲɪdʑ zɐˈmʲætʲɪn]; 1 February [O.S. 20 January] 1884 – 10 March 1937), sometimes anglicized as Eugene Zamiatin, was a Russian author of science fiction, philosophy, literary criticism, and political satire.

The son of a Russian Orthodox priest, Zamyatin abandoned Christianity at an early age and became a Bolshevik. As a member of his Party's Pre-Revolutionary underground, Zamyatin was repeatedly arrested, beaten, imprisoned, and exiled. But Zamyatin was just as deeply disturbed by the policies pursued by the All-Union Communist Party (Bolsheviks) following the October Revolution as he had been by Tsarist policy.

Due to his subsequent use of literature to both satirize and criticize the Soviet Union's enforced conformity and increasing totalitarianism, Zamyatin, whom Mirra Ginsburg has dubbed "a man of incorruptible and uncompromising courage," is now considered one of the first Soviet dissidents. He is most famous for his highly influential and widely imitated 1921 dystopian science fiction novel We, which is set in a futuristic police state.

In 1921, We became the first work banned by the Soviet censorship board. Ultimately, Zamyatin arranged for We to be smuggled to the West for publication. The outrage this sparked within the Party and the Union of Soviet Writers led directly to the State-organized defamation and blacklisting of Zamyatin and his successful request for permission from Joseph Stalin to leave his homeland. In 1937 he died in poverty in Paris.

After his death, Zamyatin's writings were circulated in samizdat and continued to inspire multiple generations of Soviet dissidents.

== Early life ==
Zamyatin was born in Lebedyan, Tambov Governorate, 300 km (186 mi) south of Moscow. His father was a Russian Orthodox priest and schoolmaster, and his mother a musician. In a 1922 essay, Zamyatin recalled: "You will see a very lonely child, without companions of his own age, on his stomach, over a book, or under the piano, on which his mother is playing Chopin." Zamyatin may have had synesthesia since he gave letters and sounds qualities. He saw the letter Л as having pale, cold and light blue qualities.

He studied engineering for the Imperial Russian Navy in Saint Petersburg, from 1902 until 1908. During this time, Zamyatin lost his faith in Christianity, became an atheist and a Marxist, and joined the Bolshevik faction of the Russian Social Democratic Labour Party.

== 1905: Revolt and repression ==
Zamyatin later recalled the Russian Revolution of 1905 as follows: "In those years, being a Bolshevik meant following the line of greatest resistance, and I was a Bolshevik at that time. In the fall of 1905 there were strikes, and the dark Nevsky Prospekt was pierced by a searchlight from the Admiralty Building. October 17. Meetings in the universities."

In December 1905, Zamyatin agreed to hide in his flat a paper bag filled with the explosive pyroxylin. The following day, he and thirty other Bolsheviks were arrested by the Okhrana inside their "revolutionary headquarters of the Vyborg district, at the very moment when plans and pistols of various types were spread out on the table."

After being arrested and beaten up, Zamyatin managed to smuggle a note out of the prison, instructing his fellow Bolsheviks, "to remove everything compromising from my room and the rooms of my four comrades." Although this was immediately done, Zamyatin did not know of it until much later. During the months he spent in solitary confinement, Zamyatin recalled that he had almost daily nightmares about the paper bag in his flat containing pyroxylin.

In the spring of 1906, Zamyatin was released and sent into exile in his native Tambov Governorate. However, Zamyatin later wrote that he could not stand life among the devoutly Russian Orthodox peasantry of Lebedyan. Therefore, he escaped and returned to Saint Petersburg where he lived illegally before moving to Helsinki, in the Grand Duchy of Finland.

After illegally returning to St. Petersburg, "disguised, clean-shaven, with a pince-nez astride my nose," Zamyatin began to write fiction as a hobby. He was arrested and exiled a second time in 1911. He later recalled, "I lived first in an empty dacha at Sestroretsk, then, in winter, in Lakhta. There amidst snow, solitude, quiet, I wrote A Provincial Tale."

== Return to St. Petersburg, visit to England ==
In 1913, Zamyatin was granted an amnesty as part of the celebrations for 300 years of rule by the House of Romanov and granted the right to return to St. Petersburg. His A Provincial Tale, which satirized life in a small Russian town, was immediately published and brought him a degree of fame. The next year he was tried and acquitted for defaming the Imperial Russian Army in his story Na Kulichkakh (At the World's End). He continued to contribute articles to Marxist newspapers. After graduating as an engineer for the Imperial Russian Navy, Zamyatin worked professionally at home and abroad.

In March 1916, he was sent to England to supervise the construction of icebreakers at the shipyards of Armstrong Whitworth in Walker and Swan Hunter in Wallsend while living in Newcastle upon Tyne. He supervised the building of the Krassin, which retained the distinction of being the most powerful icebreaker in the world into the 1950s. He also worked on the Lenin.

Zamyatin later wrote, "My only previous visit to the West had been to Germany. Berlin had impressed me as a condensed, 80-percent version of Petersburg. In England it was quite different: everything was as new and strange as Alexandria and Jerusalem had been some years before."

Zamyatin later recalled, "In England, I built ships, looked at ruined castles, listened to the thud of bombs dropped by German Zeppelins, and wrote The Islanders. I regret that I did not see the February Revolution, and know only the October Revolution (I returned to Petersburg, past German submarines, in a ship with lights out, wearing a life belt the whole time, just in time for October). This is the same as never having been in love and waking up one morning already married for ten years or so."

== 1917–1931: Return to Russia ==
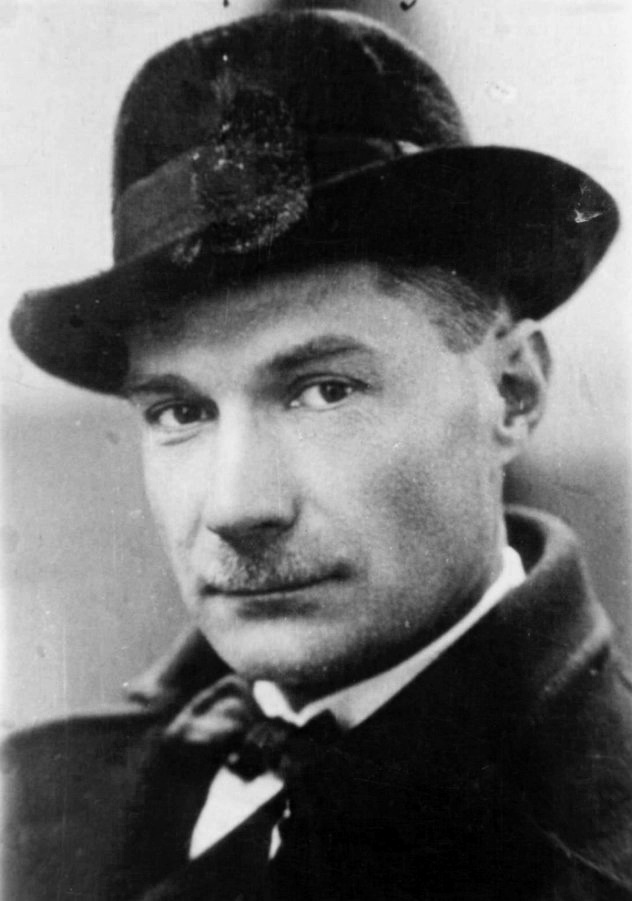
Zamyatin around 1919

Zamyatin's The Islanders, satirizing English life, and the similarly themed A Fisher of Men, were both published after his return to Russia.

According to Mirra Ginsburg:

In 1917 he returned to Petersburg and plunged into the seething literary activity that was one of the most astonishing by-products of the revolution in ruined, ravaged, hungry, and epidemic-ridden Russia. He wrote stories, plays, and criticism; he lectured on literature and the writer's craft; he participated in various literary projects and committees – many of them initiated and presided over by Maxim Gorky – and served on various editorial boards, with Gorky, Blok, Korney Chukovsky, Gumilev, Shklovsky, and other leading writers, poets, critics, and linguists. And very soon he came under fire from the newly 'orthodox' – the Proletarian Writers who sought to impose on all art the sole criterion of 'usefulness to the revolution.'

As the Russian Civil War of 1917–1923 continued, Zamyatin's writings and statements became increasingly satirical and critical toward the Bolshevik party. Even though he was an Old Bolshevik and even though "he accepted the revolution", Zamyatin believed that independent speech and thought are necessary to any healthy society and opposed the Party's increasing suppression of freedom of speech and the censorship of literature, the media, and the arts.

In his 1918 essay "Scythians?" Zamyatin criticized the Skify (Scythians) circle of writers led by Ivanov-Razumnik, over their conformity with increasingly stifling Soviet artistic norms, writing:

Christ on Golgotha, between two thieves, bleeding to death drop by drop, is the victor – because he has been crucified, because, in practical terms, he has been vanquished. But Christ victorious in practical terms is the Grand Inquisitor. And worse, Christ victorious in practical terms is a paunchy priest in a silk-lined purple robe, who dispenses benedictions with his right hand and collects donations with his left. The Fair Lady, in legal marriage, is simply Mrs. So-and-So, with hair curlers at night and a migraine in the morning. And Marx, having come down to earth, is simply a Krylenko. Such is the irony and such is the wisdom of fate. Wisdom because this ironic law holds the pledge of eternal movement forward. The realization, materialisation, practical victory of an idea immediately gives it a philistine hue. And the true Scythian will smell from a mile away the odor of dwellings, the odor of cabbage soup, the odor of the priest in his purple cassock, the odor of Krylenko — and will hasten away from the dwellings, into the steppe, to freedom."

Later in the same essay, Zamyatin quoted a recent poem by Andrei Bely and used it to further criticize People's Commissar for Military Affairs Nikolai Krylenko and those like him for having, "covered Russia with a pile of carcasses" and for "dreaming of socialist–Napoleonic Wars in Europe — throughout the world, throughout the universe! But let us not jest incautiously. Bely is honest, and did not intend to speak about the Krylenkos."

In 1919, Zamyatin wrote, "He who has found his ideal today is, like Lot's wife, already turned into a pillar of salt and does not move ahead. The world is kept alive only by heretics: the heretic Christ, the heretic Copernicus, the heretic Tolstoy. Our symbol of faith is heresy."

Zamyatin's novel We, which he wrote between 1920 and 1921, is set many centuries in the future. D-503, a mathematician, lives in the One State, (Note: Translating the phrase Yedinoye Gosudarstvo (Russian: Единое Государство), the Ginsburg and Randall translations use the phrasing "One State". Guerney uses "The One State"—each word is capitalized. Brown uses the single word "OneState", which he calls "ugly".) an urban society constructed almost entirely of glass apartment buildings, which assist mass surveillance by the secret police, the Bureau of Guardians. The structure of the One State is Panopticon-like, and life is scientifically managed based on the theories of F. W. Taylor. People march in step with each other and are uniformed. There is no way of referring to people except by numbers assigned by the One State. The society is run strictly by logic or reason as the primary justification for the laws or the construct of the society. The individual's behaviour is based on logic by way of formulas and equations outlined by the One State.

As the novel opens, the spaceship Integral is being built in order to visit extraterrestrial planets. In a deliberate swipe at the expansionist dreams of Nikolai Krylenko and others like him, the One State intends to "force" alien races "to be happy" by accepting the absolutism of the One State and its leader, the Benefactor. Meanwhile, as the spaceship's chief engineer, D-503 begins a journal that he intends to be carried upon the completed spaceship.

Like all other citizens of One State, D-503 lives in a glass apartment building and is carefully watched by the Bureau of Guardians. D-503's lover, O-90, has been assigned by the One State to visit him on certain nights. She is considered too short to bear children and is deeply grieved by her state in life. O-90's other lover and D-503's best friend is R-13, a State poet who reads his verse at public executions.

While on an assigned walk with O-90, D-503 meets a woman named I-330. I-330 smokes cigarettes, drinks vodka, and shamelessly flirts with D-503 instead of applying for a pink-ticket sex-visit; all of these acts are highly illegal according to the laws of One State.

Both repelled and fascinated, D-503 struggles to overcome his attraction to I-330. He begins dreaming, which people of the One State know to be a serious mental illness. Slowly, I-330 reveals to D-503 that she is in a member of MEPHI, an organization of rebels against the One State. I-330 also takes D-503 through secret tunnels to the untamed wilderness outside the Green Wall, which surrounds the city-state. There, D-503 meets human inhabitants whom the One State claims do not exist: hunter-gatherers whose bodies are covered with animal fur. MEPHI aims to topple the One State, destroy the Green Wall, and reunite the people of the city with the outside world.

Like many other dystopian novels, We does not end happily for I-330 and D-503. It also ends with a general uprising by MEPHI and with the One State's survival in doubt. A recurring theme throughout We is that, just as there is no highest number, there can be no final revolution. Unsurprisingly, the Soviet Government refused to allow the publication of We.

In his 1921 essay "I Am Afraid", Zamyatin began by criticizing the poets who unconditionally sang the praises of the new Soviet government. Zamyatin compared them with the Court Poets under the House of Romanov and under the French House of Bourbon. Zamyatin further criticized "these nimble authors" for knowing "when to sing hail to the Tsar, and when to the Hammer and Sickle". Zamyatin then wrote: "True literature can exist only when it is created, not by diligent and reliable officials, but by madmen, hermits, heretics, dreamers, rebels and skeptics." Zamyatin continued by pointing out that writers in the new Soviet Union were forbidden to criticize and satirise, in the vein of Jonathan Swift and Anatole France, the foibles and failings of the new society. Zamyatin added that, while many compared Russia after the October Revolution to the Athenian democracy at its inception, the Athenian government and people did not fear the satirical stage-plays of Aristophanes, in which everyone was mocked and criticized. Zamyatin concluded by pointing out that if the Party did not rid itself of "this new Catholicism, which is every bit as fearful of every heretical word as the old one", then the only future possible for Russian literature was "in the past."

In Zamyatin's 1923 essay "The New Russian Prose" he wrote: "In art, the surest way to destroy is to canonize one given form and one philosophy: that which is canonized dies of obesity, of entropy." In his 1923 essay "On Literature, Revolution, Entropy, and Other Matters" Zamyatin wrote:

The law of revolution is red, fiery, deadly; but this death means the birth of a new life, a new star. And the law of entropy is cold, ice blue, like the icy interplanetary infinities. The flame turns from red to an even, warm pink, no longer deadly, but comfortable. The sun ages into a planet, convenient for highways, stores, beds, prostitutes, prisons; this is the law. And if the planet is to be kindled into youth again, it must be set on fire, it must be thrown off the smooth highway of evolution: this is the law. The flame will cool tomorrow, or the day after tomorrow (in the Book of Genesis days are equal to years, ages). But someone must see this already, and speak heretically today about tomorrow. Heretics are the only (bitter) remedy against the entropy of human thought. When the flaming, seething sphere (in science, religion, social life, art) cools, the fiery magma becomes coated with dogma — a rigid, ossified, motionless crust. Dogmatization in science, religion, social life, or art is the entropy of thought. What has become dogma no longer burns; it only gives off warmth — it is tepid, it is cool. Instead of the Sermon on the Mount, under the scorching sun, to upraised-arms and sobbing people, there is drowsy prayer in a magnificent abbey. Instead of Galileo's, 'Be still, it turns!' there are dispassionate computations in a well-heated room in an observatory. On the Galileos, the epigones build their own structures, slowly, bit by bit, like corals. This is the path of evolution – until a new heresy explodes the crush of dogma and all the edifices of the most enduring which have been raised upon it. Explosions are not very comfortable. And therefore the exploders, the heretics, are justly exterminated by fire, by axes, by words. To every today, to every civilization, to the laborious, slow, useful, most useful, creative, coral-building work, heretics are a threat. Stupidly, recklessly, they burst into today from tomorrow; they are romantics. Babeuf was justly beheaded in 1797; he leaped into 1797 across 150 years. It is just to chop off the head of a heretical literature which challenges dogma; this literature is harmful. But harmful literature is more useful than useful literature, for it is anti-entropic, it is a means of challenging calcification, sclerosis, crust, moss, quiescence. It is Utopian, absurd – like Babeuf in 1797. It is right 150 years later.

Zamyatin also wrote a number of short stories, in fairy tale form, that constituted satirical criticism of Communist ideology. According to Mirra Ginsburg:

Instead of idealized eulogies to the Revolution, Zamyatin wrote stories like The Dragon, The Cave, and A Story about the Most Important Thing, reflecting the starkness and the territory of the time: the little man lost in his uniform, transformed into a dragon with a gun; the starving, frozen intellectual reduced to stealing a few logs of wood; the city turned into a barren, prehistoric landscape – a desert of caves and cliffs and roaring mammoths; fratricide and destruction and blood. In The Church of God, he questions the Bolshevik tenet that the end justifies the means. In The Flood, he gives the central place to individual passions against a background that reflects the vast changes of the time as marginally and obliquely as they are reflected in the consciousness of his characters – residents of an outlying suburb, whose knowledge of the history around them is limited to such facts as the deteriorating quality of coal, the silent machines, the lack of bread."

In 1923, Zamyatin arranged for the manuscript of his dystopian science-fiction novel We to be smuggled to E.P. Dutton and Company in New York City. After being translated into English by Russian refugee Gregory Zilboorg, the novel was published in 1924. Then, in 1927, Zamyatin went much further. He smuggled the original Russian text to Marc Lvovich Slonim (1894–1976), the editor of an anti-communist Russian émigré magazine and publishing house based in Prague. To the fury of the Soviet State, copies of the Czechoslovak edition began being smuggled back to the Soviet Union and secretly passed from hand to hand. Zamyatin's secret dealings with Western publishers triggered a mass offensive by the Soviet State against him.

These attitudes, writings, and actions, which the Party considered Deviationism, made Zamyatin's position increasingly difficult as the 1920s wore on. Zamyatin became, according to Mirra Ginsburg, one of "the first to become the target of concerted hounding by the Party critics and writers." According to Ginsburg:

Zamyatin's vision was too far-reaching, too nonconformist, and too openly expressed to be tolerated by the purveyors of official and compulsory dogma. Very early he was branded by Trotsky as an internal émigré. He was repeatedly attacked as a bourgeois intellectual, out of tune with the revolution. When the Party-line Russian Association of Proletarian Writers (RAPP) gained full sway in the latter 1920s, with the end of the New Economic Policy and the introduction of the first Five Year Plan, it set out systematically to end all originality and independence in the arts. Art had to serve the ends of the Party or it had no right to exist."

Max Eastman, an American Communist who had similarly broken with his former beliefs, described the Politburo's war against Zamyatin in his 1934 book Artists in Uniform.

According to Mirra Ginsburg:

All the instruments of power were brought into use in the campaign for conformity. Faced with grim alternatives, most of Zamyatin's erstwhile pupils and colleagues yielded to pressure, recanted publicly, in many cases rewrote their works, and devoted themselves to turning out the gray eulogies to Communist construction demanded by the dictatorship. Other writers, like Babel and Olesha, chose silence. Many committed suicide. Zamyatin's destruction took a different form. One of the most active and influential figures in the All-Russian Writers' Union, which included a variety of literary schools, he became the object of a frenzied campaign of vilification. He was dismissed from his editorial posts; magazines and publishing houses closed their doors to him; those which ventured to publish his work were persecuted; his plays were withdrawn from the stage. Under the pressure of the Party inquisitors, his friends began to be afraid to see him and many of his comrades in the Writer's Union denounced him. He was, in effect, presented with the choice of repudiating his work and his views, or total expulsion from literature.

Instead of surrendering, Zamyatin, whom Mirra Ginsburg has dubbed "a man of incorruptible and uncompromising courage," on 24 September 1929, wrote and mailed a letter resigning his membership in the Union of Soviet Writers. Ginsburg states Zamyatin wrote in his resignation letter "that it was impossible for him to remain in a literary organization which, even indirectly, took part in the persecution of its members." In 1931, he appealed directly to Soviet General Secretary Joseph Stalin, requesting permission to leave the Soviet Union. In this letter Zamyatin wrote: "I do not wish to conceal that the basic reason for my request for permission to go abroad with my wife is my hopeless position here as a writer, the death sentence that has been pronounced upon me as a writer here at home."

During the spring of 1931, Zamyatin asked Maxim Gorky to intercede with Stalin on his behalf.

After Gorky's death in 1936, Zamyatin wrote:

One day, Gorky's secretary telephoned to say that Gorky wished me to have dinner with him at his country home. I remember clearly that extraordinarily hot day and the rainstorm — a tropical downpour — in Moscow. Gorky's car sped through a wall of water, bringing me and several other invited guests to dinner at his home. It was a literary dinner, and close to twenty people sat around the table. At first Gorky was silent, visibly tired. Everybody drank wine, but his glass contained water – he was not allowed to drink wine. After a while, he rebelled, poured himself a glass of wine, then another and another, and became the old Gorky. The storm ended, and I walked out onto the large stone terrace. Gorky followed me immediately and said to me, 'The affair of your passport is settled. But if you wish, you can return the passport and stay.' I said I would go. Gorky frowned and went back to the other guests in the dining room. It was late. Some of the guests remained overnight; others, including myself, were returning to Moscow. In parting, Gorky said, 'When shall we meet again? If not in Moscow, then perhaps in Italy? If I go there, you must come to see me! In any case, until we meet again, eh?' This was the last time I saw Gorky.

Zamyatin left the Soviet Union in November 1931.

== Life in exile ==
After their emigration, Zamyatin and his wife settled in Paris. According to Mirra Ginsburg: "Zamyatin's last years in Paris were years of great material hardship and loneliness. As Remizov wrote, 'He came with sealed lips and a sealed heart.' He found little in common with most of the emigrés who had left Russia a decade earlier."

The screenplay for Jean Renoir's The Lower Depths (1936), from Maxim Gorky's stage play of the same name, was co-written by Zamyatin.

Zamyatin later wrote: "Gorky was informed of this, and wrote that he was pleased at my participation in the project, that he would like to see the adaptation of his play, and would wait to receive the manuscript. The manuscript was never sent: by the time it was ready for mailing, Gorky was dead." After the film premiered, Zamyatin wrote articles for French magazines and worked on a novel, The Scourge of God, which has Attila as the main character. The novel was never finished.

== Death and burial ==
Yevgeny Zamyatin died in poverty of a heart attack on 10 March 1937. Only a small group of friends were present for his burial at the Cimetière de Thiais, in the Parisian suburb of the same name.

One of the mourners, however, was Zamyatin's Russian language publisher Marc Lvovich Slonim, who had befriended the Zamyatins after their arrival in the West. His death was unreported in the Soviet press.

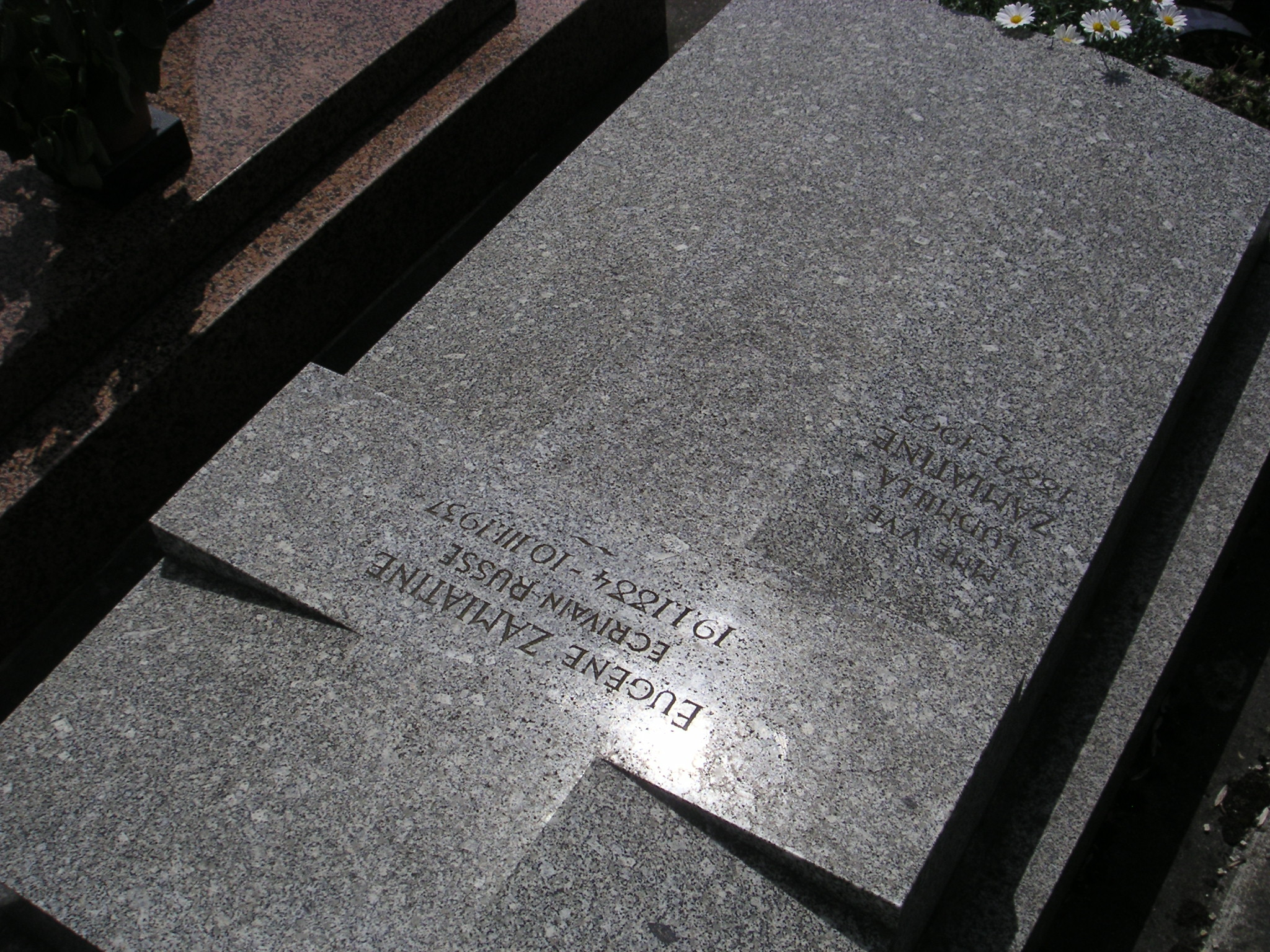
Tomb of Yevgeny Zamyatin at the "Cimetière de Thiais", Division 21, Line 5, Grave 36.

== Legacy ==
Writing in 1967, Mirra Ginsburg commented: "Like Bulgakov and like Babel, Zamyatin gives us a glimpse of what post-revolutionary Russian literature might have become had independence, daring, and individuality not been stamped out so ruthlessly by the dictatorship. The Russian reader – and by the same token, the Russian writer – was deprived of the work of these rich and germinal writers, and the effects, alas, are sadly evident."

The Communist Party of the Soviet Union's vengeance, however, against Zamyatin for sending his novel We to the West for publication was remembered by Soviet poets and writers long after the writer's death. This is why it was 1957 before another Soviet writer took the risk of doing so again. In that year, when he handed the manuscript to his novel Doctor Zhivago over to an emissary from billionaire Italian publisher Giangiacomo Feltrinelli, Boris Pasternak said: "You are hereby invited to watch me face the firing squad."

Even though Pasternak was accordingly subjected to State-organized character assassination, ostracism, and blacklisting almost identical to what had been experienced by Zamyatin, Pasternak's decision to publish Doctor Zhivago in the West also helped him to win the 1958 Nobel Prize for Literature.

Not surprisingly, many other Soviet dissidents after Pasternak would also go on to both use and expand upon the ideas and tactics pioneered by the author of We. For example, Alexander Solzhenitsyn was Christianizing Zamyatin's attacks against State-enforced conformity when he wrote, in his 1973 Letter to Soviet Leaders: "Our present system is unique in world history, because over and above its physical and economic constraints, it demands of us total surrender of our souls, continuous and willing participation in the general, conscious lie. To this putrefaction of the soul, this spiritual enslavement, human beings who wish to be human cannot submit. When Caesar, having exacted what is Caesar's, demands still more insistently that we render unto him what is God's – that is a sacrifice we dare not make."

In the same year, Solzhenitsyn responded to the KGB's seizure of a hidden manuscript of The Gulag Archipelago, his nonfiction exposé of the Soviet secret police, the Soviet concentration camps, and the role of Vladimir Lenin in setting up both, by ordering his publisher in France to publish the whole book immediately. This resulted, as with Zamyatin, in Solzhenitsyn's departure from his homeland.

As part of last Soviet General Secretary Mikhail Gorbachev's reformist policies of glasnost and perestroika, Zamyatin's writing began to again be published legally in his homeland in 1988.

Even since the collapse of the Soviet Union in 1991, Zamyatin's many denunciations of enforced conformity and groupthink, as well as his belief that writers and intellectuals have a duty to oppose the calcification and entropy of human thought, has meant that his writings continue to have both readers and admirers.

=== Science fiction ===
We has often been discussed as a political satire aimed at the police state of the Soviet Union. There are many other dimensions, however. It may variously be examined as

1. a polemic against the optimistic scientific socialism of H. G. Wells, whose works Zamyatin had previously published, and with the heroic verses of the (Russian) Proletarian Poets,
2. as an example of Expressionist theory, and
3. as an illustration of the archetype theories of Carl Jung as applied to literature.

George Orwell believed that Aldous Huxley's Brave New World (1932) must be partly derived from We. However, in a 1962 letter to Christopher Collins, Huxley says that he wrote Brave New World as a reaction to H.G. Wells's utopias long before he had heard of We. Kurt Vonnegut said that in writing Player Piano (1952) he "cheerfully ripped off the plot of Brave New World, whose plot had been cheerfully ripped off from Yevgeny Zamyatin's We."

We directly inspired:

- Aldous Huxley's Brave New World (1932)
- Ayn Rand's Anthem (1938)
- George Orwell's Nineteen Eighty-Four (1949)
- Kurt Vonnegut's Player Piano (1952)
- Ursula K. Le Guin's The Dispossessed (1974)

In 1994, We received a Prometheus Award in the Libertarian Futurist Society's "Hall of Fame" category.

== Major writings ==
- Uezdnoe (Уездное), 1913 – "A Provincial Tale" (tr. Mirra Ginsburg, in The Dragon: Fifteen Stories, 1966)
- Na kulichkakh (На куличках), 1914 – A Godforsaken Hole (tr. Walker Foard, 1988)
- Ostrovitiane (Островитяне), 1918 – "The Islanders" (tr. T.S. Berczynski, 1978) / 'Islanders' (tr. Sophie Fuller and Julian Sacchi, in 'Islanders and the Fisher of Men, 1984)
- Mamai (Мамай), 1921 – "Mamai" (tr. Neil Cornwell, in Stand, 4. 1976)
- Lovets chelovekov (Ловец человеков), 1921 – 'The Fisher of Men' (tr. Sophie Fuller and Julian Sacchi, in Islanders and the Fisher of Men, 1984)
- Peshchera (Пещера), 1922 – 'The Cave' (tr. Mirra Ginsburg, Fantasy and Science Fiction, 1969) – The House in the Snow-Drifts (Dom v sugrobakh), film adaptation in 1927, prod. Sovkino, dir. Fridrikh Ermler, starring Fyodor Nikitin, Tatyana Okova, Valeri Solovtsov, A. Bastunova
- Ogni sviatogo Dominika (Огни святого Доминика), 1922 (play)
- Bol'shim detiam skazki (Большим детям сказки), 1922
- Robert Maier (Роберт Майер), 1922
- Gerbert Uells (Герберт Уэллс), 1922 [H.G. Wells]
- On Literature, Revolution, and Entropy, 1924
- Rasskaz o samom glavnom (Рассказ о самом главном), 1924 – "A Story about the Most Important Thing" (tr. Mirra Ginsburg, in The Dragon: Fifteen Stories, 1966)
- Blokha (Блоха), 1926 (play, based on Leskov's folk-story "Levsha", translated as The Left-Handed Craftsman)
- Obshchestvo pochotnykh zvonarei (Общество почетных звонарей), 1926 (play)
- Attila (Аттила), 1925–27
- My: Roman (Мы: Роман), 'We: A Novel' 1927 (translations: Gregory Zilboorg, 1924; Bernard Guilbert Guerney, 1970, Mirra Ginsburg, 1972; Alex Miller, 1991; Clarence Brown, 1993; Natasha Randall, 2006; first Russian-language book publication 1952, U.S.) – Wir, TV film in 1982, dir. Vojtěch Jasný, teleplay Claus Hubalek, starring Dieter Laser, Sabine von Maydell, Susanne nAltschul, Giovanni Früh, Gert Haucke
- Nechestivye rasskazy (Нечестивые рассказы), 1927
- Severnaia liubov' (Северная любовь), 1928
- Sobranie sochinenii (Собрание сочинений), 1929 (4 vols.)
- Zhitie blokhi ot dnia chudesnogo ee rozhdeniia (Житие блохи от дня чудесного ее рождения), 1929
- 'Navodnenie', 1929 – The Flood (tr. Mirra Ginsburg, in The Dragon: Fifteen Stories, 1966) – Film adaptation in 1994, dir. Igor Minayev, starring Isabelle Huppert, Boris Nevzorov, Svetlana Kryuchkova, Mariya Lipkina
- Sensatsiia, 1930 (from the play The Front Page, by Ben Hecht and Charles MacArthur)
- Dead Man's Sole, 1932 tr. unknown
- Nos: opera v 3-kh aktakh po N.V. Gogoliu, 1930 (libretto, with others) – The Nose: Based on a Tale by Gogol (music by Dmitri Shostakovich; tr. Merle and Deena Puffer, 1965)
- Les Bas-Fonds / The Lower Depths, 1936 (screenplay based on Gorky's play) – Film produced by Films Albatros, screenplay Yevgeni Zamyatin (as E. Zamiatine), Jacques Companéez, Jean Renoir, Charles Spaak, dir. Jean Renoir, starring Jean Gabin, Junie Astor, Suzy Prim, Louis Jouvet
- Bich Bozhii, 1937
- Litsa, 1955 – A Soviet Heretic: Essays (tr. Mirra Ginsburg, 1970)
- The Dragon: Fifteen Stories, 1966 (tr. Mirra Ginsburg, reprinted as The Dragon and Other Stories)
- Povesti i rasskazy, 1969 (introd. by D.J. Richards)
- Sochineniia, 1970–88 (4 vols.)
- Islanders and the Fisher of Men, 1984 (tr. Sophie Fuller and Julian Sacchi)
- Povesti. Rasskazy, 1986
- Sochineniia, 1988 (ed. T.V. Gromov)
- My: Romany, povesti, rasskazy, skazki, 1989
- Izbrannye proizvedeniia: povesti, rasskazy, skazki, roman, pesy, 1989 (ed. A.Iu. Galushkin)
- Izbrannye proizvedeniia, 1990 (ed. E. Skorosnelova)
- Izbrannye proizvedeniia, 1990 (2 vols., ed. O. Mikhailov)
- Ia boius': literaturnaia kritika, publitsistika, vospominaniia, 1999 (ed. A.Iu. Galushkin)
- Sobranie sochinenii, 2003–04 (3 vols., ed. St. Nikonenko and A. Tiurina)

== See also ==
- Outline of the Russian Revolution and Civil War
- Bibliography of the Russian Revolution and Civil War
- Bibliography of Stalinism and the Soviet Union
- Index of Old Bolsheviks
- Index of articles related to the Russian Revolution and Civil War
