= Korenev =

Korenev (Russian: Коренев, from корень meaning root) is a Russian masculine surname, its feminine counterpart is Koreneva. It may refer to

- Ilya Korenev (born 1995), Russian ice hockey player
- Vladimir Korenev (1940-2020), Russian film and theater actor
- Yelena Koreneva (born 1953), Russian actress
