= Vladimir Chebotaryov =

Soviet and Russian film director and screenwriter

- Born: Vladimir Aleksandrovich Chebotaryov; 16 August 1921; Karachev, Bryansk Oblast, RSFSR
- Died: 4 March 2010 (aged 88); Moscow, Russia
- Occupation: Film director
- Years active: 1952–1993
- Notable work: Amphibian Man (1961)
- Spouse: Ada Sergeevna Duchavina

Vladimir Aleksandrovich Chebotaryov (Russian: Влади́мир Алекса́ндрович Чеботарёв; 16 August 1921 – 4 March 2010) was a Soviet and Russian film director and screenwriter. Honored Artist of the Russian Federation (1994).

== Early years ==
Vladimir Chebotaryov was born in the city of Karachev, Bryansk Oblast. In 1941 he graduated from the Rostov Military School. Soon the Great Patriotic War started. He arrived to the Kiev Military District and was appointed a commanding officer of the artillery battery. During one of the battles he was injured and sent to a war hospital. In several days the hospital was occupied by Nazi forces. Same night Chebotaryov and two other soldiers managed to escape. They spent many days traveling through the Nazi-occupied territory of the modern-day Ukraine to the front line.

At one point Vladimir stayed at the Kramarenki khutor at the house of a young woman Ekaterina Kramarenko. Someone reported to the Gestapo, Chebotaryov was arrested and sent to a prison camp. In half a year he managed to make another successful prison break and returned to Ekaterina who had already given a birth to their child – a girl they named Tamara. He then headed back to war. On his way he met a group of Soviet intelligence officers who escorted him to a SMERSH unit. Following a check he was sent to the front line. He finished the war in Budapest in 1945.

After the war he went through another check at the NKVD filtration camp, although Ekaterina was told that he was missing in action. By the time Vladimir was released, her family had moved to North Ossetia because of the famine and poor living conditions. Chebotaruov received a similar answer on his request to the Ukrainian SSR: «no one survived». Only in 2008, shortly before his death, a group of journalists from Twenty Years Later (a short-living TV show created by Pavel Chukhray for the TV Tsentr channel) managed to find his daughter and reunite them. Ekaterina Kramarenko had already deceased by that time.

== Career ==
Chebotaryov spent the post-war years studying at VGIK under Mikhail Romm. In 1952 he finished director's courses and started working as an assistant director at the Lenfilm studio. Only in 1959 he directed his first movie The Son of Iriston. Ironically, it was a biographical film about Kosta Khetagurov, the national poet of the Ossetian people, thus he worked in North Ossetia for several months without even realizing that his beloved and their daughter were also living there.

In 1961 he directed his most successful movie – Amphibian Man based on the science fiction novel of the same name by Alexander Belyaev. With 65.5 million viewers it became the leader of the 1962 Soviet box office and the 11th most popular Soviet movie ever released. According to Chebotaryov, this was also the first film to be shot at the bottom of the Black Sea, in Crimea. He even contacted Jacques Cousteau who agreed to help, but the studio refused to give foreign currency to pay for what they considered a kids movie.

The novelty of the production required a lot from both filmmakers and actors. Vladimir and the cinematographer Eduard Rozovsky spent a year scuba diving under the guidance of the best Soviet divers, spending 260 and 400 hours (respectfully) under the water. Both leading actors – Vladimir Korenev and Anastasiya Vertinskaya – also went through hard training and performed without stuntmen. While Gennadi Kazansky is listed as a co-director, Chebotaryov claimed that he had little to nothing to do with film production, he could not even swim and was sent to look after Vladimir by the heads of the studio after a scandal during the shooting of Don Quixote where he served as an assistant director.

He had been working at the Mosfilm studio since 1963, primarily directing spy, mystery and war movies. In 1985 he co-directed one of the last war epics of the Soviet Union – The Battalions Request Fire TV mini-series based on the novel of the same name by Yuri Bondarev. It was dedicated to 40 years since the Soviet victory in the Great Patriotic War. The main parts were performed by Aleksandr Zbruyev, Oleg Yefremov, Vadim Spiridonov, Aleksandr Galibin, Nikolai Karachentsov, Igor Sklyar.

== Late years ==
Since 1993 Chebotaryov had been trying to produce a movie Stalin and Tukhachevsky about the tragic fate of the Soviet commander Mikhail Tukhachevsky. He claimed that his screenplay was based on the closed archives, yet he was not able to get enough financing. Just several days before he died, an autobiographical book «From Amphibian Man to The Battalions Request Fire» had been published.

Chebotaryov died on 4 March 2010. He was buried at the Vostryakovskoe cemetery besides his wife Ada Sergeevna Duchavina, a costume designer at Mosfilm and a former top-model. He was survived by their daughter Irina, his stepson Vladimir Tykke (Russian actor and main director of the Baltic House Festival Theatre in Saint Petersburg) and his daughter Tamara Kramarenko (born 1942, see Early years).

== Selected filmography ==
- Don Quixote (1957) (assistant director)
- Iriston's Son (director)
- Amphibian Man (1962) (co-director with Gennadi Kazansky)
- How Should I Call You Now? (1965) (director, screenwriter)
- Crash (1968) (director, screenwriter)
- Yeralash (since 1974) (director of episodes)
- Diamonds for Maria (1975) (director)
- A Ring from Amsterdam (1981) (director)
- The Battalions Request Fire (1985) (co-director with Aleksandr Bogolyubov)
- Why Would an Honest Man Need an Alibi? (1992) (director, screenwriter)

== Literature ==
- Tatiana Bulkina (2011), pages 265—280. A Bow to the Soviet Cinema. – Moscow: Publishing house Moscovia, 385 pages. ISBN 5-7151-0333-9 (Interviews)
- Vladimir Chebotaryov (2010). From Amphibian Man to The Battalions Request Fire. – Moscow: Fenix, 288 pages. ISBN 978-5-222-16496-9 (Autobiography)

== See also ==
- List of solved missing person cases (pre-1950)
