= Katka's Reinette Apples =

1926 film

- Directed by: Fridrikh Ermler; Eduard Ioganson
- Written by: Mikhail Borisoglebsky; Boris Leonidov
- Cinematography: Yevgeni Mikhajlov; Andrei Moskvin
- Production company: Sovkino
- Release date: 25 December 1926
- Running time: 74 minutes
- Country: Soviet Union
- Languages: Silent; Russian intertitles

Katka's Reinette Apples (Russian: Катька - бумажный ранет, romanized: Katka - bumazhnyy ranet) is a 1926 Soviet silent drama film directed by Fridrikh Ermler and Eduard Ioganson.

The film's art direction was by Yevgeni Yenej.

== Plot ==
Katka's Reinette Apples (1926)

The film is set in Soviet Russia during the mid-1920s. The family of a young peasant woman Katya (Veronica Buzhinskaya) is left without a single food source when their cow dies. To save money for a new Jersey, Katya leaves her native village to work in Leningrad. Once she is in the big city, she falls in with a bad crowd by associating with the thief Syomka Zhgut (Valery Solovtsov). The girl starts to sell Reinette apples to earn money for a living and for the aforementioned new cow. Soon after meeting Syomka, Katya becomes pregnant and gives birth to his child. Once on the street, Katya meets a downtrodden homeless intellectual Vadka Zavrazhina (Fedor Nikitin), nicknamed "Tiligent". Taking pity on him, she invites him to her place.

== Cast ==
- Veronika Buzhinskaya as Katka
- Bella Chernova as Verka
- Yakov Gudkin as Semka's companion
- Fyodor Nikitin as Vadka Zavrazhin or "Tiligent"
- Tatyana Okova
- Valeri Plotnikov
- Valeri Solovtsov as Syomka Zhgut
- Eduard Ioganson as Drunk in the restaurant

== Interesting Facts ==
- One of the directors of the film, Edward Johanson in a cameo plays a man who tries to get a goat tied to the table to drink.
- In the original version of the script Katka and Syomka's baby dies.

== Bibliography ==
- Christie, Ian & Taylor, Richard. The Film Factory: Russian and Soviet Cinema in Documents 1896-1939. Routledge, 2012.
