= New Year Adventures of Masha and Vitya =

- Directed by: Igor Usov; Gennadi Kazansky
- Written by: Pavel Finn
- Starring: Natasha Simonova; Yura Nakhratov; Igor Efimov
- Cinematography: Semyon Ivanov; L. Aleksandrov; L. Golubeev
- Edited by: Lyudmila Obrazumova
- Music by: Gennady Gladkov
- Production company: Lenfilm
- Release date: 1975
- Running time: 71 minutes
- Country: Soviet Union
- Language: Russian

New Year Adventures of Masha and Vitya (Russian: Новогодние приключения Маши и Вити, romanized: Novogodnyie priklucheniya Mashi i Viti) is a 1975 Soviet children's film directed by Igor Usov and Gennadi Kazansky.

== Plot ==
Elementary school children Vitya and Masha are complete opposites; Vitya believes only in science and technology, while Masha believes in miracles. During the hall's preparation for the New Year at their school, Masha brings to life the sculpture of Father Frost with a magic spell, who transports her and Vitya to a fairy-tale world to save the Snow Maiden: Koschei kidnapped the Snow Maiden to arrange the New Year for his evil spirits.

Father Frost gives the children three tips: One, do not wait for anyone to help, but help everyone in need, 2) do not get lost in a difficult moment and 3) hold on to each other when in a bad situation. Learning this, Koschey sends them an impure force – the vocal-instrumental trio "Wild Guitars": Baba Yaga, Leshy and Wild Cat Matvei. Masha and Vitya fly away on a mortar and pestle from Baba Yaga. Vitya strikes Leshy with a self-made electroshock weapon. He also distracts Wild Cat Matvei, who runs around the forest with a big slingshot, using a mechanical mouse.

On the way to Koschei's kingdom, Masha and Vitya also meet the Stove, the Apple Tree and Old Man-Forester and help them, and in return they show the children the way with the help of charcoal, an apple and a ball. But at the last moment Koshchei abducts Masha and lowers her on the elevator to his dungeon. Soon it turns out that Koshchei's teeth hurt, and Masha relieves the sorcerer's toothache with a healing rinse in exchange for the Snow Maiden's release. Vitya summons Koshchei to a duel and defeats him with an ordinary magnet. The "Wild Guitars" trio go in pursuit of children, but the Stove, the Apple Tree and Old Man-Forester help Vitya and Masha, and they return to school with the Snow Maiden, where children and Father Frost are waiting for them.

== Cast ==
- Natasha Simonova – Masha
- Yura Nakhratov – Vitya
- Igor Efimov – Father Frost
- Irina Borisova – The Snow Maiden
- George Shtil – Leshy
- Vera Titova – Stove
- Mikhail Boyarsky – Wild-Cat Matvei
- Nikolai Boyarsky – Koschei the Immortal
- Valentina Kosobutskaya – Baba Yaga
- Lyubov Virolainen – Apple Tree
- Boris Smolkin – Forester
