= Golden Beak =

1928 film

- Russian: Золотой клюв
- Directed by: Yevgeni Chervyakov
- Written by: Yevgeni Chervyakov; N. Molodtsov
- Starring: A. Yefimov; Gennadiy Michurin; Sergei Minin; Boris Livanov; Anna Sten
- Cinematography: Svyatoslav Belyayev; Aleksandr Sigaev
- Edited by: Lyubov Ivanova
- Music by: Dmitri Astradantsev
- Production company: Sovkino
- Release date: 1928
- Country: Soviet Union

Golden Beak (Russian: Золотой клюв, romanized: Zolotoy klyuv) is a 1928 Soviet drama film directed by Yevgeni Chervyakov. Screen version of the eponymous historical novel by Anna Karavaeva.

One of the last three Soviet silent films that appeared on screens in 1929, along with the films The New Babylon and Fragment of an Empire.

== Plot ==
The film depicts the harsh and oppressive conditions endured by hundreds of serfs forced to labor at the "Golden Beak" factory during the reign of Emperor Paul I. The factory, a symbol of imperial pride, demands backbreaking work under unbearable conditions. The workers dream of freedom, but their desires are met with cruel suppression by the tsarist administration. Despite the risks, a group of laborers manages to escape, determined to find the mythical Bukhtarma Valley—a promised land spoken of in legends.

The fugitives search for the valley, driven by hope and desperation. Upon reaching the cherished Bukhtarma, they establish a free peasant state where they can live without oppression. However, their newfound freedom is short-lived. The imperial authorities, intent on maintaining control, dispatch a punitive expedition to hunt down the escapees. The film portrays the resilience of the oppressed and their yearning for liberation, set against the brutal measures of a regime determined to crush any challenge to its power.

== Cast ==
- A. Yefimov as Stepan
- Gennadiy Michurin as Marey
- Sergei Minin as Sencha
- Mikhail Gipsi as The elder Shushin
- Boris Dmokhovsky as The younger Shushin
- Pyotr Berezov as Dandy
- Boris Livanov as Major Tuchkov
- Anna Sten as Varenka
- Konstantin Gibshman as Factory manager
- Antonina Sadovskaya as Manager's wife
- Aleksei Bogdanovsky as Foreign specialist
- Valeri Plotnikov as Mereykha
- A. Galatova as Ksyusha
- Leonid Kmit as Peasant
