= Burning Heart =

Burning Heart may refer to:

- Burning Heart (novel), a 1997 novel by David Stone
- The Burning Heart (film), a 1929 German silent film
- The Burning Heart (album), a 2011 album by Takida
- "Burning Heart" (song), a 1985 song by Survivor
- "Burning Heart, a 2026 song by Carly Rae Jepsen from her album Day and Night
- "Burning Heart", a 1982 song by Vandenberg from their debut album
- Burning Heart Records, a Swedish record label

== See also ==
- An Ardent Heart, an 1869 novel by Alexander Ostrovsky
- An Ardent Heart (film), a 1953 Soviet adaptation of the novel
