= Ichthyander Project =

Soviet underwater habitat project of the 1960s

The Ichthyander Project was the first project involving underwater habitats in the Soviet Union in 1960s.

Inspired by information on experiments on underwater habitats abroad (in particular, by Jacques Cousteau's Conshelf), the members of the amateur diving club "Ichthyander" in Donetsk embarked on the project of their own at a site by Tarkhankut Cape, Crimea.

The name is taken from the name of the protagonist of the Soviet film Amphibian Man.

In August 1966, in the first experiment, purely amateur, Ichthyander-66, a person spent three days continuously underwater. After newspaper news, the experiment attracted attention of authorities and scientist, and during Ichthyander-67 the habitat operated for two weeks. After Ichtyander-68 Ichtyander-70, after unsuccessful attempts to elevate it to a professional level, with state support, the project was discontinued. A 1968 Soviet popular science book Homo Aquaticus writes: "It so happened that after the 1967 expedition, an order was issued to dissolve the club". Ichthyander-68 was carried out during a short-lived attempt the members of the club to attach themselves to the Mining Science-Technical Society (Горное научно-техническое общество) to start research in underwater geodesy and drilling.

A memorial marker exists (a stone with a plaque and steel slabs) at the site.

This project preceded and catalyzed several other early Soviet experiments with underwater habitats, such as Sadko (autumn 1966), Chernomor and Sprut.

== See also ==
- Ichthyander (disambiguation)
