= My Son (1928 film) =

1928 film

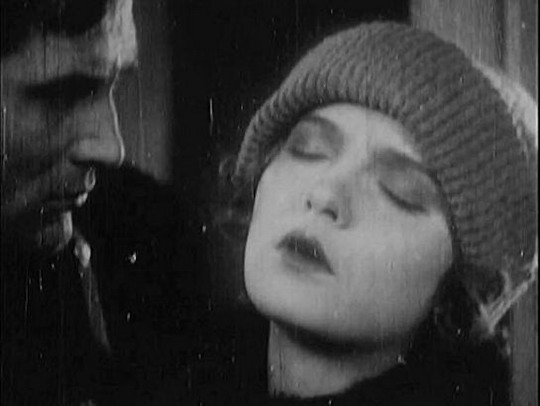
- Directed by: Yevgeni Chervyakov
- Written by: Yevgeni Chervyakov; Nikolay Dirin; Yuri Gromov
- Starring: Gennadiy Michurin; Anna Sten; Pyotr Berezov
- Cinematography: Svyatoslav Belyayev
- Production company: Sovkino
- Release date: 1928
- Country: Soviet Union
- Languages: Silent; Russian intertitles

My Son (Russian: Мой сын, romanized: Moy syn) is a 1928 Soviet silent drama film directed by Yevgeni Chervyakov and starring Gennadiy Michurin, Anna Sten and Pyotr Berezov.

== Plot ==
A wife admits to her husband that the child to whom she gave birth is not from him. After this the life of the protagonist changes dramatically.

== Interesting facts ==
The film was lost during the Great Patriotic War.

In 2008, five 16mm film reels of a film without the original titles, labeled as "El Hijo del otro" ("The son of another") were found in Argentina. Copies of the film were kept in the archive of the Museum of Cinema in Buenos Aires. Some film critics regard this event as "the biggest archival discovery in the history of Russian cinema in the last half century," and liken it to the "release of the second part of Ivan the Terrible.

== Cast ==
- Gennadiy Michurin as Andrey Surin
- Anna Sten as Olga Surina
- Pyotr Berezov as Gregor
- Lyudmila Semyonova as Neighbour
- Nikolay Cherkasov as Pat
- Boris Chirkov as Patashon
- Fyodor Nikitin as A thief
- Ursula Krug as Neighbour
- Nadezhda Yermakovich

== Bibliography ==
- Rollberg, Peter. Historical Dictionary of Russian and Soviet Cinema. Scarecrow Press, 2008.
