= The Parisian Cobbler =

1928 Soviet silent drama film

- Directed by: Fridrikh Ermler
- Written by: Boris Leonidov; Nikolai Nikitin
- Cinematography: Gleb Bushtuyev; Yevgeni Mikhajlov
- Production company: Sovkino
- Release date: 7 February 1928
- Country: Soviet Union
- Languages: Silent; Russian intertitles

The Parisian Cobbler (Russian: Парижский сапожник, romanized: Parizhskiy sapozhnik) is a 1928 Soviet silent drama film directed by Fridrikh Ermler.

== Plot ==
Komsomol girl Katya Karnakova (Veronica Buzhinskaya), a darling of the small provincial town Old Lopsha, is seriously smitten with a fellow Komsomol Andrei (Valery Solovtsov) and does not even try to hide this from others. After some time as a result of their affair, she becomes pregnant. Katya tells the news to Andrei. But he is not pleased with this news. Because birth of a child and fussing around with diapers are not included in Andrei's plans of constructing a "bright future" on a global scale. Therefore, Katya hears in response to her admission: "Oh, you dummy, dummy!" And then he promises: "Okay, I will think about it!"

At first he tries to talk about this with the secretary of the Komsomol, Grisha Sokolov (Semyon Antonov), but he without even listening gives him a book edited by Nikolai Semashko titled "Gender Issues" to Andrei, making it clear that the conversation was over. And Andrei does not find anything better to do than to request help with his problem from Motka Tundelyu (Jacob Gudkin), a well-known troublemaker of a neighborhood gang. In response, he gives him "worthwhile" advice; "Katya should be dishonored... trouble will take place ... and she will lay off." Then Andrei offers Katya to come to the ravine at dawn. And he warns her: "Only without philistinism!" She comes at the appointed time, but instead of Andrei, she is met by strange guys from a local gang of punks. Katya is about to leave, but Motka Tundel persuades her to sit down and passes her a note from Andrei, in which he offers Katya to get together with several "reliable" guys, after which the situation resolves by itself.

== Cast ==
- Veronika Buzhinskaya
- Bella Chernova
- Yakov Gudkin
- Aleksandr Melnikov
- Varvara Myasnikova
- Fyodor Nikitin
- Valeri Solovtsov

== Bibliography ==
- Christie, Ian & Taylor, Richard. The Film Factory: Russian and Soviet Cinema in Documents 1896-1939. Routledge, 2012.
