= The House in the Snow-Drifts =

1928 film

- Directed by: Fridrikh Ermler
- Screenplay by: Boris Leonidov
- Based on: "The Cave" by Yevgeny Zamyatin
- Cinematography: Gleb Bushtuyev; Yevgeni Mikhajlov
- Release date: 23 March 1928
- Running time: 49 minutes
- Country: Soviet Union
- Language: Russian

The House in the Snow-Drifts (Russian: Дом в сугробах, romanized: Dom v sugrobakh) is a 1928 Soviet drama film directed by Fridrikh Ermler. The story is set in Petrograd in 1919 and follows an unemployed musician who tries to help his sick wife.

The film is based on the short story "The Cave" by Yevgeny Zamyatin. It was released in the Soviet Union on 23 March 1928.

== Plot ==
Set in the winter of 1919 during the Defense of Petrograd, the city is under siege by the forces of Nikolai Yudenich, with its inhabitants suffering from a lack of fuel, food, and warmth. The story unfolds in a snow-covered, freezing apartment building in Petrograd. The building houses a speculator on the top floor, a musician and his sick wife on the middle floor, and the children of a Red Army soldier on the frontlines in the basement.

The musician is tormented not just by the cold and hunger but by a deep sense of helplessness and irrelevance. He feels that his music, once a source of purpose, is no longer needed. Driven to desperation to keep his ill wife warm and fed, he steals firewood from the speculator and a parrot from the children. His actions are soon discovered—remnants of firewood and feathers from the parrot, cooked as "chicken," expose him. Ashamed and overwhelmed, the musician contemplates suicide. However, he is unexpectedly invited to perform as a pianist for a club evening organized for Red Army soldiers resting from the frontlines. During the performance, the musician sees the soldiers listening with admiration and gratitude, realizing that his art still has meaning. Filled with hope, he finds a renewed purpose and envisions becoming an active participant in the new Soviet life.

== Cast ==
- Fyodor Nikitin
- Tatyana Okova
- Valeri Solovtsov as Profiteer Neighbour
- A. Bastunova
- Yakov Gudkin
- Galina Shaposhnikova
- Valeri Plotnikov
- Aleksey Maseev
