= Amphibian Man =

1928 novel by Alexander Belyayev

- Author: Alexander Belayev
- Original title: Человек-амфибия
- Language: Russian
- Genre: Science fiction
- Publication date: 1928

Amphibian Man (rus. Человек-амфибия) is a science fiction adventure novel by the Soviet Russian writer Alexander Beliaev. It was published in 1928.

== Plot ==
As a prehistory, Argentinean doctor Salvator, a scientist and surgeon, gives his adopted son, Ichthyander (Russian: Ихтиандр, Ikhtiandr) (Greek etymology: "Fish"+ "Man") a life-saving transplant - a set of shark gills. The experiment is a success but it limits the young man's ability to live outside the ocean environment and he has to spend much of his time in water.

The novel starts when Ichthyander grows up. He is noticed swimming, but is taken for a "sea devil". Captain Pedro Zurita, a local pearl gatherer, learns about Ichthyander and tries to catch him to exploit Ichthyander's exceptional diving abilities. Meanwhile Ichthyander saves Zurita, a daughter of Zurita's helper Baltasar.

== Origins ==
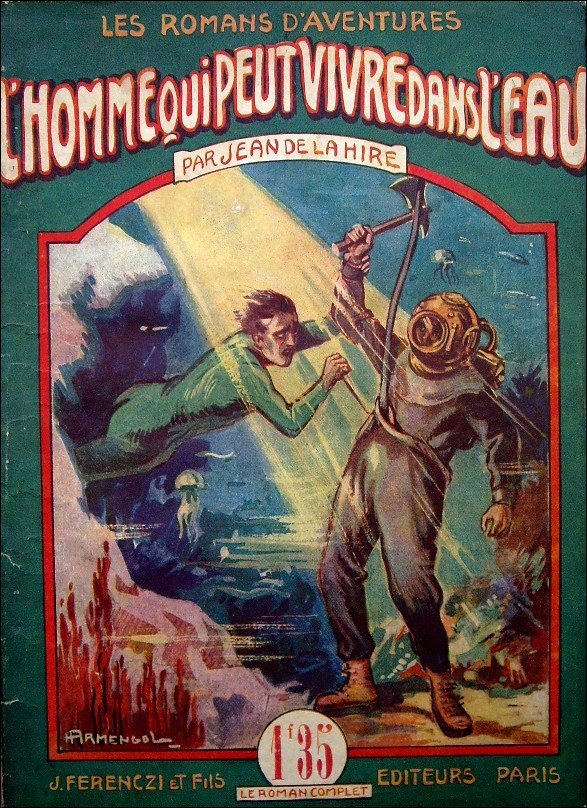
L'Homme qui peut vivre dans l'eau by Jean de La Hire, 1925 book edition

It is suggested the Belyayev borrowed the idea from the 1909 French novel The Man Who Can Live in Water by Jean de La Hire. (It was also serialized in the American newspapers under the title HICTANER The Man That Lived in the Water) In the French novel a Jesuite villain Fulbert uses Hictaner, a man to whom scientist and surgeon Oxus transplanted shark's gills, to sink ships all over the globe to blackmail the world. But his plots were failed by Hictaner's love to Moisette. Belyayev could not read French, but this novel appeared in Russian at least twice. In 1909 the ultramonarchist newspaper Zemshchina published a remake in which the supervillain was a Jew. In 1911 the magazine Свет (Light) published the translation of the French novel under the title Иктанэр и Моэзетта (Hictaner and Moisette).

== Adaptations ==
The 1962 film adaptation the Amphibian Man (Russian: Человеκ-aмфибия, translit. Chelovek-Amfibiya), was directed by Vladimir Chebotaryov. The film was the leader of Soviet distribution in 1962, with 65.5 million admissions during its initial run that year. It later sold up to 100 million admissions including re-runs, the highest for a Soviet film up until The Red Snowball Tree (1974). Filmed on the South Coast of the Crimea and in Baku and featuring a cast of beautiful young actors, the film features some popular song and dance numbers and has certain characteristics of a musical. The first song and the musical theme of the movie - "The song about the Sea Devil" became such a hit that it was sung well into the 1990s.

A 2004 Russian TV series (4 episodes) The Amphibian Man. The Sea Devil (Человек-амфибия. Морской дьявол) was aired, loosely based on the novel and set in modern days.

== Translations ==
- Foreign Languages Publishing House, Moscow
- L'Uomo Anfibio, Agenzia Alcatraz, Italia
- እንደ ሰው በምድር እንደ ዐሣ በባሕር

== Cultural influence ==
- Ichthyander Project, underwater habitat
- Daphnella ichthyandri, mollusc
- Chlorophthalmus ichthyandri, fish

== See also ==
- Aquaman
- 1928 in science fiction
