= Gennadiy Michurin =

Soviet actor (1897–1970)

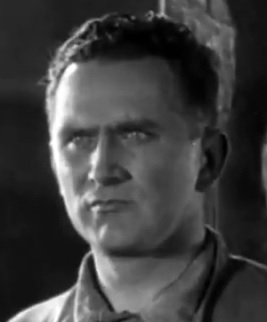
- Michurin in 1935
- Born: Gennadiy Mikhailovich Michurin; 3 September 1897
- Died: 12 October 1970 (aged 73); Leningrad, Soviet Union
- Occupation: Actor
- Years active: 1924-1968 (film)

Gennadiy Mikhailovich Michurin (Russian: Геннадий Михайлович Мичу́рин; 1897–1970) was a Soviet stage and film actor.

== Biography ==
Michurin was born 1897. In 1917-1918 he studied at the Petrograd School of theatrical skill. In 1918 he became an actor of the Bolshoi Drama Theater.

In the movie starred in 1923, made his debut in the role of Dmitry Karakozov.

== Selected filmography ==
- The Palace and the Fortress (1924)
- The Decembrists (1927)
- The Poet and the Tsar (1927)
- My Son (1928)
- Kastus Kalinovskiy (1928)
- Golden Beak (1928)
- Cities and Years (1930)
- An Ardent Heart (1953)

== See also ==
- Vsevolod Meyerhold State Theatre

== Bibliography ==
- Lilya Kaganovsky / Masha Salazkina. Sound, Speech, Music in Soviet and Post-Soviet Cinema. Indiana University Press, 2014.
