= Gennadi Kazansky =

Soviet film director

- Born: 1 December 1910; Voronezh, Russian Empire
- Died: 14 September 1983 (aged 72); Soviet Union
- Occupations: Writer, Director
- Years active: 1937-1979 (film)
- Notable work: Amphibian Man (1961)

Gennadi Kazansky (1 December 1910 – 14 September 1983) was a Soviet film director of the Soviet era.

== Life and career ==
Gennadi Kazansky was born on 18 November 18 or December 1910 in Voronezh. He studied art history at the Leningrad Institute of Art History and graduated in 1930. He was an associate professor of the practice of cinematic arts at the Russian State Institute of Performing Arts. His film career began in 1931. He worked at the film studio Lenfilm, first as an assistant director, and since 1937 as a director.

During the war, along with other employees of Lenfilm and Mosfilm, he was evacuated to Almaty, where he worked at the film studio Kazakhfilm, then at Mosfilm.

In 1944 he returned to Leningrad and continued to work at Lenfilm. From 1946 to 1947 he was an employee of the Ashkhabad Film Studio, then again returned to Lenfilm, where he worked for the rest of his life.

In 1956 he staged a children's film Old Khottabych based on the fairy tale by Lazar Lagin, which won a number of prizes at international festivals.

The film Amphibian Man, codirected with Vladimir Chebotaryov, became the leader of Soviet distribution in 1962 (65.5 million viewers). It is little-known in the West, but has become a cult classic in Soviet Union.

Gennadi Kazansky died on September 14, 1983. He was buried at the Bogoslovskoe Cemetery in Leningrad.

== Selected filmography ==
- Rimsky-Korsakov (1952)
- An Ardent Heart (1953)
- Old Khottabych (1956)
- Amphibian Man (1962)
- The Snow Queen (1966)
- New Year Adventures of Masha and Vitya (1975)

== Bibliography ==
- Goble, Alan. The Complete Index to Literary Sources in Film. Walter de Gruyter, 1999.
