= Iriston's Son =

1959 Soviet history film

- Russian: Сын Иристона
- Directed by: Vladimir Chebotaryov
- Written by: Roman Fatuev; Maksim Tsagarayev
- Starring: Vladimir Tkhapsaev; Lia Eliava; Nina Alisova; Nikolay Volkov; Pavel Kadochnikov
- Cinematography: Eduard Rozovsky
- Music by: Ilia Gabarayev
- Release date: 1959
- Country: Soviet Union
- Language: Russian

Iriston's Son (Russian: Сын Иристона) is a 1959 Soviet history film directed by Vladimir Chebotaryov.

The film portrays the life and legacy of the Ossetian poet, journalist, and artist Kosta Khetagurov.

== Plot ==
Kosta Khetagurov, expelled from the St. Petersburg Academy of Arts, returns to his homeland. Opening an art workshop, he takes commissions for religious icon painting to make a living. However, his outspoken criticism of government abuses leads to his arrest.

After spending several years working in a mine, an older and weathered Kosta Khetagurov returns once again to his native land, known as Iriston in the Ossetian language.

== Cast ==
- Vladimir Tkhapsaev as Konstantin Levanovich (Kosta) Khetagurov
- Lia Eliava as Anna Aleksandrovna Tsalikova
- Nina Alisova as Varvara Grigoryevna Shreders
- Nikolay Volkov as General Kokhanov
- Pavel Kadochnikov as Dzhambul Dzakhsorov
- Vladimir Kosarev as Vasiliy Dobrokhotov
- Anatoli Abramov
- Georgi Chernovolenko
