= The Girl from Leningrad =

- Russian poster
- Russian: Фронтовые подруги
- Directed by: Viktor Eisymont
- Written by: Sergey Mikhalkov; Mikhail Rosenberg
- Starring: Zoya Fyodorova; Mariya Kapustina; Olga Fyodorina; Tamara Alyoshina; Yekaterina Melentyeva; Andrei Abrikosov
- Cinematography: Vladimir Rapoport
- Music by: Vissarion Shebalin
- Release date: 1941
- Country: Soviet Union
- Language: Russian

The Girl from Leningrad (Russian: Фронтовые подруги) is a 1941 Soviet World War II film directed by Viktor Eisymont.

The film takes place during the Finnish war. A group of girls voluntarily go to the front, they help doctors save the lives of wounded soldiers, and also fight with the enemy.

== Plot ==
In a bustling Red Cross office, a group of young women volunteers sign up to join a team of nurses who will work in a frontline hospital during World War II. Among them is Natasha Matveeva, a confident and determined young woman who consciously chooses to serve as a nurse to be closer to her fiancé, Lieutenant Sergei Korovin. As the group of volunteers travels to their destination, they are told that the hospital is not yet set up, and they must first clean and prepare a neglected building, gather water, and prepare sleeping arrangements. Soon after, the wounded begin arriving, and the nurses are thrust into their work.

As the days pass, Natasha learns that one of the patients, a scout named Andrei Morozov, requires special care in the heavy casualty ward. Morozov, a serious and reserved man about whom even newspapers have written, is assigned to Natasha’s care. She spends long hours speaking with him, reading passages from War and Peace, and singing songs to soothe him. Slowly, the cold and distant Morozov begins to thaw, and it becomes clear that his feelings for Natasha have grown beyond just medical attention.

Despite the growing attraction between them, Natasha refuses to acknowledge her feelings for the wounded scout, convincing herself and her friends that her heart belongs only to her fiancé, whom she believes is nearby. She continues to deny any emotional connection to Morozov, even as she spends more time with him. However, her own fate takes a turn when she becomes injured and finds herself in the same hospital, now in need of the same support and care she once provided to Morozov.

== Cast ==
- Zoya Fyodorova as Natasha
- Mariya Kapustina as Tamara
- Olga Fyodorina as The Cricket
- Tamara Alyoshina as Zina
- Yekaterina Melentyeva as Shura
- Andrei Abrikosov as Lt. Sergei Korovin
- Konstantin Adashevsky as Dr. Katner
- Yury Tolubeev as Maj. Braginsky
- Boris Blinov as Andrei Morosov
