= An Ardent Heart (film) =

1953 film by Gennady Kazansky

- Romanian film poster
- Directed by: Gennadi Kazansky
- Written by: Aleksandr Ostrovskiy (play)
- Starring: Gennadiy Michurin; Anna Belousova; Tamara Alyoshina; Aleksandr Borisov; Konstantin Kalinis
- Cinematography: Aleksandr Ksenofontov
- Production company: Lenfilm Studio
- Release date: 1953
- Running time: 179 minutes
- Country: Soviet Union
- Language: Russian

An Ardent Heart (Russian: Горячее сердце, romanized: Goryachee serdtse) is a 1953 Soviet drama film directed by Gennadi Kazansky and starring Gennadiy Michurin, Anna Belousova and Tamara Alyoshina. It is based on the play An Ardent Heart by Aleksandr Ostrovskiy. It was made by Lenfilm Studio.

== Synopsis ==
The famous merchant Kuroslepov wastes his life binge drinking. The household is run by his wife Matrona, an overbearing and immoral woman who spends her husband's money, has an affair with the bailiff and strongly oppresses Parasha, Kuroslepov's daughter from his first marriage. The plot develops around the loss of a large sum of money. Parasha's groom Vasya gets accused of stealing and is threatened with being sent to serve in the army. The unfortunate young woman desperately prays for her man. The cowardly and prudent Vasya agrees to become a clown of the merchant Khlynov, who buys him off from conscription. Realizing the nullity of her beloved, Parasha finds happiness with a clerk Gavrila who is infatuated with her.

== Cast ==
- Gennadiy Michurin as Kuroslepov Pavlin Pavlinovich
- Anna Belousova as Kuroslepov's wife
- Tamara Alyoshina as Parasha
- Aleksandr Borisov as Gavrilo
- Konstantin Kalinis as Vasya Shustryi
- Konstantin Skorobogatov as Gradoboev Serapion Mordarievich
- Konstantin Adashevsky as Khlynov Taras Tarasovich
- G. Osipenko as Silan

== Bibliography ==
- Goble, Alan. The Complete Index to Literary Sources in Film. Walter de Gruyter, 1999. ISBN 978-1-85739-229-6.
