= Veronika Buzhinskaya =

Russian actress

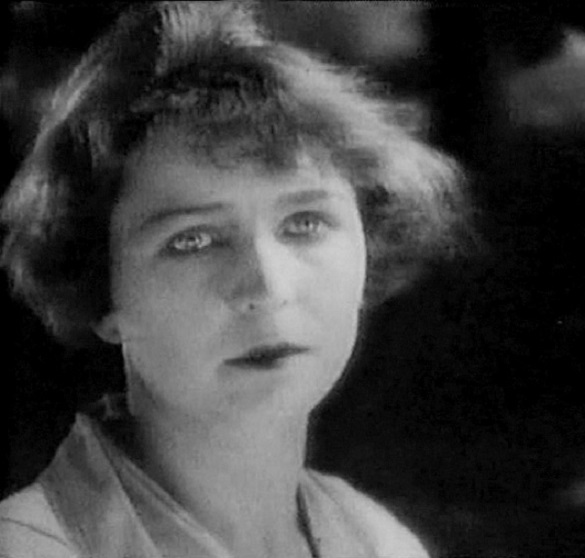
- Born: Veronika Buzhinskaya; January 28, 1895
- Died: July 21, 1983 (aged 88)
- Occupation: actress
- Years active: 1922–1929

Veronika Buzhinskaya (Russian: Вероника Бужинская) was a Soviet film actress.

== Selected filmography ==
- 1922 – Dolya ty russkaya, dolyushka zhenskaya
- 1926 – Katka's Reinette Apples
- 1927 – The Decembrists (film)
- 1928 – The Parisian Cobbler
- 1963 – An Optimistic Tragedy
