= Tamara Alyoshina =

Soviet actress (1919–1999)

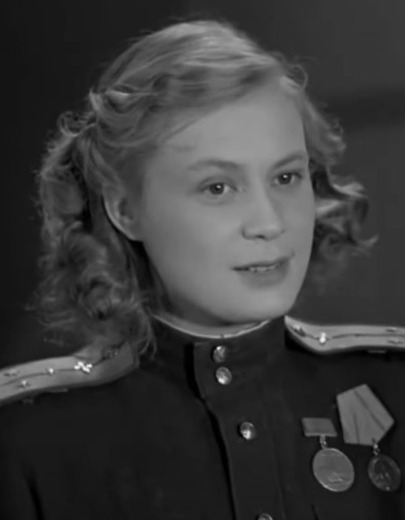
- Alyoshina in 1945
- Born: May 10, 1919; Petrograd, USSR
- Died: September 21, 1999 (aged 80); St Petersburg, Russia
- Occupation: Actress
- Years active: 1940-1999

Tamara Ivanonva Alyoshina (Russian: Тамара Ивановна Алёшина; May 10, 1919 - September 21, 1999) was a Soviet actress. She is most famous for the films The Girl from Leningrad, Tri Goda and Lastochka.

== Early life ==
Alyoshina was born on May 10, 1919, in Petrograd, Soviet Union. Her parents served in World War I. She graduated from the Russian State Institute of Performing Arts in 1940.

== Career ==
Alyoshina began acting professionally as soon as she left university, and quickly became known for acting in war films The Girl from Leningrad and Girlfriends, to the Front, both of which encouraged Soviet women to become involved with the war effort. After the conclusion of World War II, Alyoshina acted in many dramas, with major roles in films like Lastochka and The Third, Pathetic. She kept acting up until her death in 1999.

== Personal life and death ==
Alyoshina married fellow actor Yuri Tolubeyev, who she had a child with, Andrei Tolubeyev. She died in Saint Petersburg, Russia, on September 21, 1999, at the age of 80.
