= Ilya Korenev =

Russian ice hockey player

- Born: February 10, 1995 (age 30); Khabarovsk, Russia
- Height: 6 ft 0 in (183 cm)
- Weight: 174 lb (79 kg; 12 st 6 lb)
- Position: Forward
- Shoots: Left
- KHL team: Lokomotiv Yaroslavl
- NHL draft: Undrafted
- Playing career: 2013–present

Ilya Olegovich Korenev (Коренев Илья Олегович; born February 10, 1995) is a Russian ice hockey player who is currently playing with Lokomotiv Yaroslavl of the Kontinental Hockey League (KHL).

Korenev made his Kontinental Hockey League (KHL) debut playing with Lokomotiv Yaroslavl during the 2013–14 KHL season.
