= Daphnella ichthyandri =

Scientific classification
- Kingdom: Animalia
- Phylum: Mollusca
- Class: Gastropoda
- Subclass: Caenogastropoda
- Order: Neogastropoda
- Superfamily: Conoidea
- Family: Raphitomidae
- Genus: Daphnella
- Species: D. ichthyandri

Binomial name
- Daphnella ichthyandri Sysoev & Ivanov, 1985

Synonyms
- Daphnella (Eubela) ichthyandri Sysoev & Ivanov, 1985 (original combination); Eubela ichthyandri Sysoev & Ivanov, 1985

Species of gastropod

Daphnella ichthyandri is a species of sea snail, a marine gastropod mollusk in the family Raphitomidae.

== Distribution ==
This marine species was found on the Nazca Ridge, Southeast Pacific
