= Fyodor Nikitin =

Soviet actor (1900–1988)

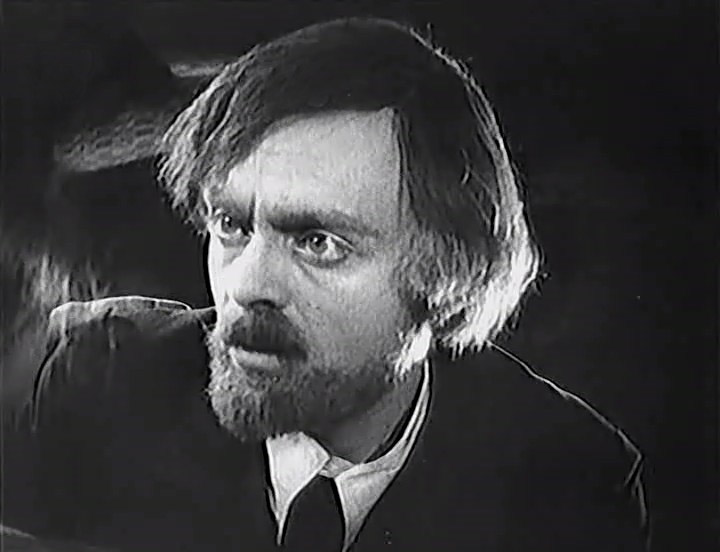
Fyodor Nikitin in 1927

Fyodor Mikhailovich Nikitin (Russian: Фёдор Миха́йлович Ники́тин; May 3, 1900 in Lokhvytsia – July 17, 1988 in Moscow) was a Soviet film and theater actor. People's Artist of the RSFSR (1969). Winner of two Stalin Prizes first degree (1950, 1951).

== Filmography ==
- Katka's Reinette Apples (1926) as Vadka Zavrazhin
- The House in the Snow-Drifts (1928) as Musician
- The Parisian Cobbler (1928) as Kirik Rudenko, deaf-mute shoemaker
- My Son (1928) as thief
- Fragment of an Empire (1929) as Filimonov
- The Lonely White Sail (1937) as Vasily Petrovich Bachei, teacher
- Ivan Pavlov (1949) as professor Zvantsev
- Mussorgsky (1950) as Alexander Dargomyzhsky
- Rimsky-Korsakov (1953) as Grand Duke Vladimir Alexandrovich of Russia
- Heroes of Shipka (1955) as Lord Derby
- Princess Mary (1955) as Prince Ligovskoy
- Iriston's Son (1959) as professor Chernyshyov
- Northern Story (1960) as doctor Traube
- Barrier of the Unknown (1961) as doctor Romashov
- Cherry Town (1962) as Semyon Semyonovich Baburov
- Come Here, Mukhtar! (1964) as Trofim Ignatyevich Zyryanov, veterinarian
- On the Same Planet (1965) as Pyotr Obolensky, archive director
- A Mother's Heart (1965) as Neklyudov, prosecutor
- Year as Long as Life (1966) as Walter-Sokrat
- A Winter Morning (1967) as Professor
- Funny Magic (1969) as Koschei the Immortal
- Sweet Woman (1976) as Shubkin, Larik's father
- The Days of the Turbins (1976) as Maksim
- Po sekretu vsemu svetu (1976) as Sergei Petrovich Kolokolov
- Almanzor's Rings (1977) as Almanzor the Wizard
- The Dog in the Manger (1978) as Ottavio, majordomo
- Pugachev (1978) as valet
- Among Grey Stones (1983) as Professor
- And Life, and Tears, and Love (1983) as Pavel Andreyevich Krupenin
