= Fragment of an Empire =

1929 film

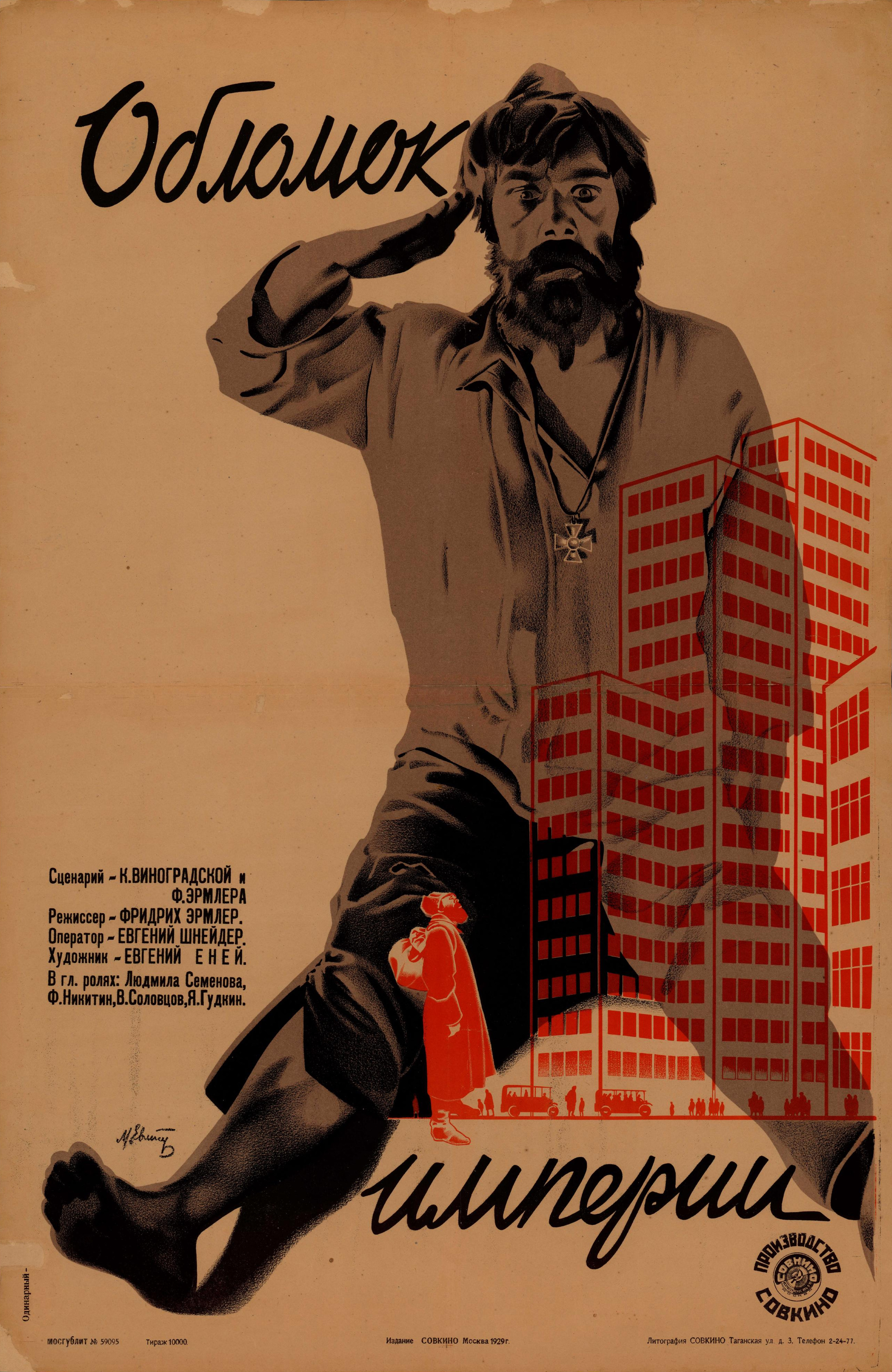
- Directed by: Fridrikh Ermler
- Written by: Fridrikh Ermler; Ekaterina Vinogradskaya
- Starring: Emil Gal; Sergey Gerasimov
- Cinematography: Gleb Bushtuyev; Yevgeni Shneider
- Edited by: Lev Kuleshov
- Production company: Sovkino
- Release date: 28 October 1929
- Running time: 96 minutes, 110 minutes (2018 restoration)
- Country: Soviet Union
- Languages: Silent; Russian intertitles

Fragment of an Empire (1929) by Fridrikh Ermler

Fragment of an Empire (Russian: Обломок империи, romanized: Oblomok imperii) is a 1929 Soviet silent drama film directed by Fridrikh Ermler.

== Plot ==
A soldier named Filimonov loses his memory after experiencing severe shell shock during the Russian Civil War. Years later, in 1928, he sees a woman in a passing train, and the encounter jolts his memory, reminding him of his past life. Eager to rediscover his identity, Filimonov travels to his hometown, St. Petersburg, now renamed Leningrad. Upon arriving, he is disoriented by the city’s transformation, marked by new architecture, bustling modernity, and the statue of Vladimir Lenin standing prominently in the town square. Seeking to reconnect with his former life, he visits his old workplace, now a workers' factory committee. To his surprise, the factory is managed by none other than the Red Army soldier he once saved during the war. Embracing his place in the new order, Filimonov begins to understand the changes around him and tries to adjust to a society where the workers and peasants are now in charge.

Encouraged by his co-workers, Filimonov decides to search for his wife, who had assumed him dead. He finds her living with a Soviet apparatchik, a man who abuses his authority at home and mistreats her. Despite Filimonov’s attempts to persuade her to leave and start a new life with him, his wife, torn and resigned, ultimately decides to stay in her current situation, declaring that their shared past is over. Heartbroken but not defeated, Filimonov accepts her decision and turns to address the audience directly. Breaking the fourth wall, he reflects on the challenges of the new Soviet society and declares resolutely that "there is still much work to be done," symbolizing his readiness to embrace the ongoing transformation of the world around him.

== Restoration ==
The movie was restored in 2018 by an international team of silent movie experts, including San Francisco Silent Film Festival board president Robert Byrne and Peter Bagrov, a former archivist from the Russian Gosfilmofond. The restoration was primarily based on a 35mm print from the EYE Filmmuseum in Amsterdam, the Netherlands. A couple of missing shots and intertitles were taken from a print sourced from the Swiss Cinémathèque. Crucially, the scene where Jesus on the crucifix is shown with a gas mask was inserted again. A new soundtrack was composed for the Dutch premiere at the EYE Filmmuseum by Colin Benders, using a Eurorack modular synthesizer.

== Cast ==
- Fyodor Nikitin as Filimonov
- Yakov Gudkin as The wounded soldier
- Lyudmila Semyonova as Filimonov's wife
- Valeri Solovtsov as Filimonov's wife's new husband
- Emil Gal as Passenger in the train
- Sergei Gerasimov
- Ursula Krug
- Varvara Myasnikova
- Vyacheslav Viskovsky as Former Employer
- Aleksandr Melnikov as Member of the Komsomol

== Reception ==
The Russian Guild of Film Critics placed Fragment of an Empire in its list of the 100 best films in the history of Russian cinema.

== Bibliography ==
- Christie, Ian & Taylor, Richard. The Film Factory: Russian and Soviet Cinema in Documents 1896–1939. Routledge, 2012.
