= Amphibian Man (film) =

1962 film

- Soviet poster for Amphibian Man
- Directed by: Gennadi Kazansky; Vladimir Chebotaryov
- Screenplay by: Akiba Golburt; Aleksandr Ksenofontov; Aleksei Kapler
- Based on: "Amphibian Man" by Alexander Beliaev
- Produced by: Ivan Provotorov
- Starring: Vladimir Korenev; Anastasiya Vertinskaya; Mikhail Kozakov
- Cinematography: Eduard Rozovsky
- Edited by: Lyudmila Obrazumova
- Music by: Andrei Petrov
- Production company: Lenfilm
- Distributed by: BijouFlix Releasing; National Telefilm Associates (TV syndication)
- Release date: January 3, 1962
- Running time: 82 min.
- Country: Soviet Union
- Language: Russian
- Box office: 100 million admissions

Amphibian Man (Russian: Человек-амфибия, translit. Chelovek-amfibiya) is a 1962 Soviet science fiction romance film directed by Vladimir Chebotaryov and Gennadi Kazansky. The film stars Vladimir Korenev and Anastasiya Vertinskaya in the lead roles.

The plot is based upon the eponymous 1928 novel by Alexander Beliaev. It focuses on a youth named Ichthyander (Russian: Ихтиандр, Ichtiandr) (from Greek: fish+man) who was surgically altered to survive under the sea. It was given the name of Tarzan des Mers before the estate of Edgar Rice Burroughs took exception.

The film was the leader of Soviet distribution in 1962, with 65.5 million admissions during its initial run that year. It later sold up to 100 million admissions including re-runs, the highest for a Soviet film up until The Red Snowball Tree (1974).

== Plot ==
The story is set in a seaside port in Argentina (filmed in Baku, Azerbaijan SSR), largely among a community of pearl fishers. The protagonist, Ichthyander, is the adopted son of a doctor-scientist, Doctor Salvator, who saved the boy’s life by implanting him with shark gills, granting him the ability to live underwater. However, Ichthyander must keep this secret from the world. His peaceful existence changes when he rescues Guttiere, a pearl fisher's beautiful daughter, from a shark. Captivated by her, Ichthyander ventures into the city to find her, only to learn that she believes her savior was the greedy businessman Pedro Zurita.

Conflict arises as Zurita, Guttiere's suitor and eventual husband, discovers Ichthyander’s secret and seeks to exploit his underwater abilities to harvest pearls. Ichthyander is captured and kept caged underwater, which damages his ability to breathe on land. Although he is eventually freed with the help of allies, his health deteriorates to the point where he must live permanently in the sea. Guttiere, meanwhile, is freed from her unhappy marriage when her father kills Zurita, but the lovers are tragically separated forever.

Although primarily a lost-love tragedy akin to Romeo and Juliet, the film also critiques greed and the exploitation of natural resources, reflecting the influence of Socialist Realism.

== Cast ==
Actor	Role
Vladimir Korenev	Ichthyander (voiced by Yuri Rodionov)
Anastasiya Vertinskaya	Guttiere (voiced by Nina Gulyaeva)
Mikhail Kozakov	Pedro Zurita
Anatoly Smiranin	Old Baltazar
Nikolay Simonov	Prof. Salvator
Vladlen Davydov	Olsen, the reporter
Sergei Boyarsky	Chief Prison Guard
Anatoli Ivanov	Ichthyander understudy in the most challenging underwater shots
Stanislav Chekan	prison guard
Nikolai Kuzmin	sailor
Mikhail Medvedev	boatswain
Yuri Medvedev	fishmonger
Anna Nikritina	Zurita’s mother
Tito Romalio Jr.	newsboy
Georgi Tusuzov	episode
Aleksandr Zakharov	policeman

== Home media ==
The Amphibian Man made its debut on DVD on August 21, 2001 where it was released by Image Entertainment. It was later re-released by VFN on July 9, 2015.

== Western world ==
Amphibian Man is little-known in the West, but has become a cult classic. Hollywood filmmaker Quentin Tarantino cited Amphibian Man as one of his favourite Russian films, stating that he grew up watching an English dubbed version often shown on American television in the 1970s.

There have been accusations that the 2017 Hollywood film The Shape of Water plagiarised Amphibian Man.

== Notes ==
=== Sources ===
- Шахназаров, А. А. (2000). Пока все дома. Додэка.
