= Continental Shelf Station Two =

Undersea research habitat in the Red Sea

Coordinates: 19.928783°N 37.4132°E

Continental Shelf Station Two or Conshelf Two was an attempt at creating an environment in which people could live and work on the sea floor. It was the successor to Continental Shelf Station One (Conshelf One).

The alternate designation Precontinent has also been used to describe the set of projects to build an underwater "village" carried out by Jacques-Yves Cousteau and his team. The projects were named Precontinent I (Conshelf One), Precontinent II (Conshelf Two) and Precontinent III (Conshelf Three). Each following project was aimed at increasing the depth at which people continuously lived under water.

== Precontinent I ==
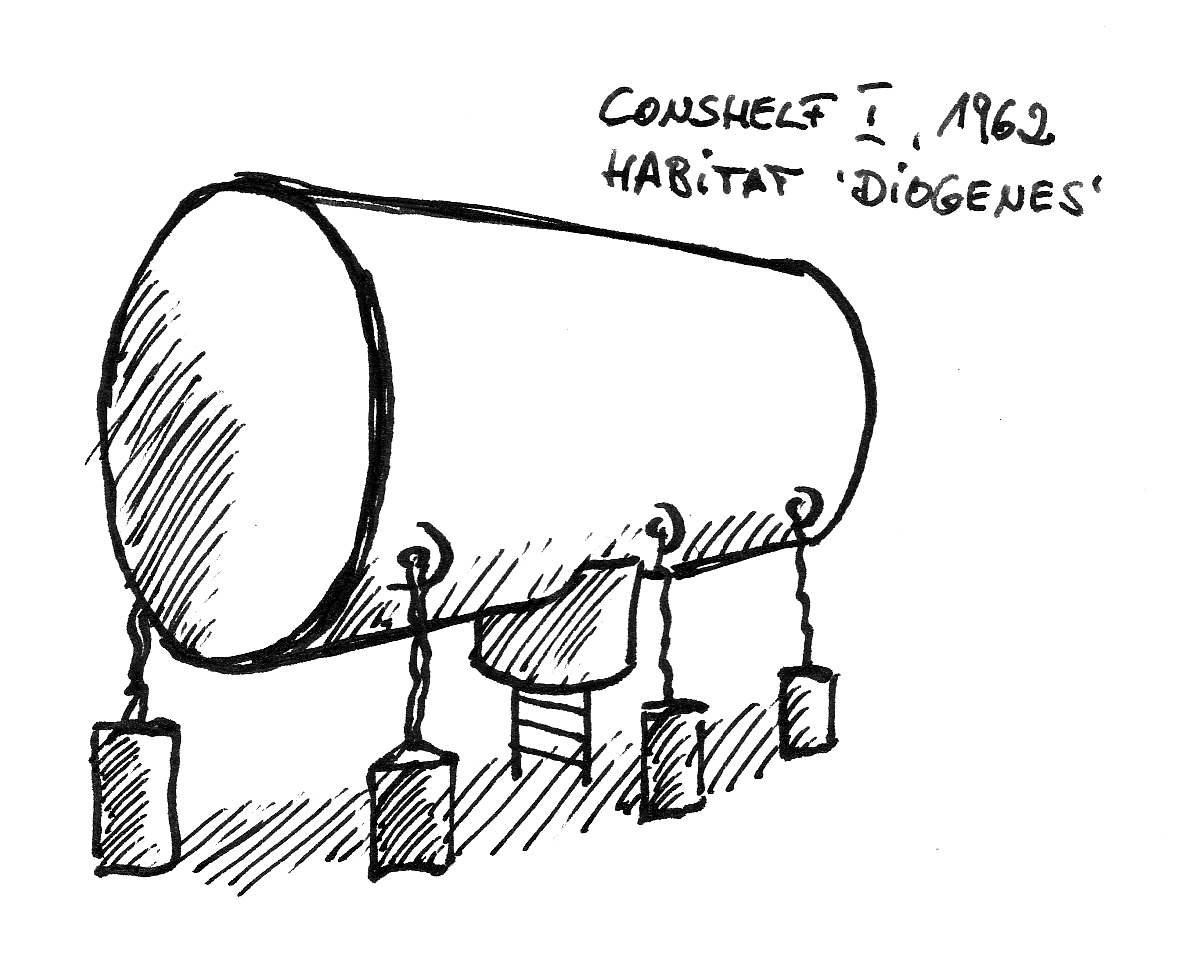
Habitat "Diogenes", Conshelf I

Precontinent I was constructed offshore from Marseille, France, in 1962. Two scuba divers spent two weeks in a small chamber 12 meters deep on the seabed.

== Precontinent II ==
In 1963, six oceanauts lived 10 metres down in the Red Sea, at Sha’ab Rumi off Sudan, in a starfish-shaped house for 30 days. The undersea living experiment also had two other structures, one a submarine hangar that housed a small, two man submarine referred to as the "diving saucer" for its resemblance to a science fiction flying saucer, and a smaller "deep cabin" where two oceanauts lived at a depth of 30 metres for a week. The undersea colony was supported with air, water, food, power, and all other essentials of life, from a large support team above. Men on the bottom performed a number of experiments intended to determine the practicality of working on the sea floor and were subjected to continual medical examinations.

Two support ships on the surface provided compressed air and other logistical support to Precontinent II. When the experiment ended, two structures were dismantled and removed. The rest became undersea destinations for recreational divers. The work was funded in part by the French petrochemical industry, who, along with Jacques Cousteau, hoped that such manned colonies could serve as base stations for the future exploitation of the sea.

Conshelf Two is documented in Jacques Cousteau's 1964 documentary film World Without Sun, that won Best Documentary at the 37th Academy Awards.

Conshelf II

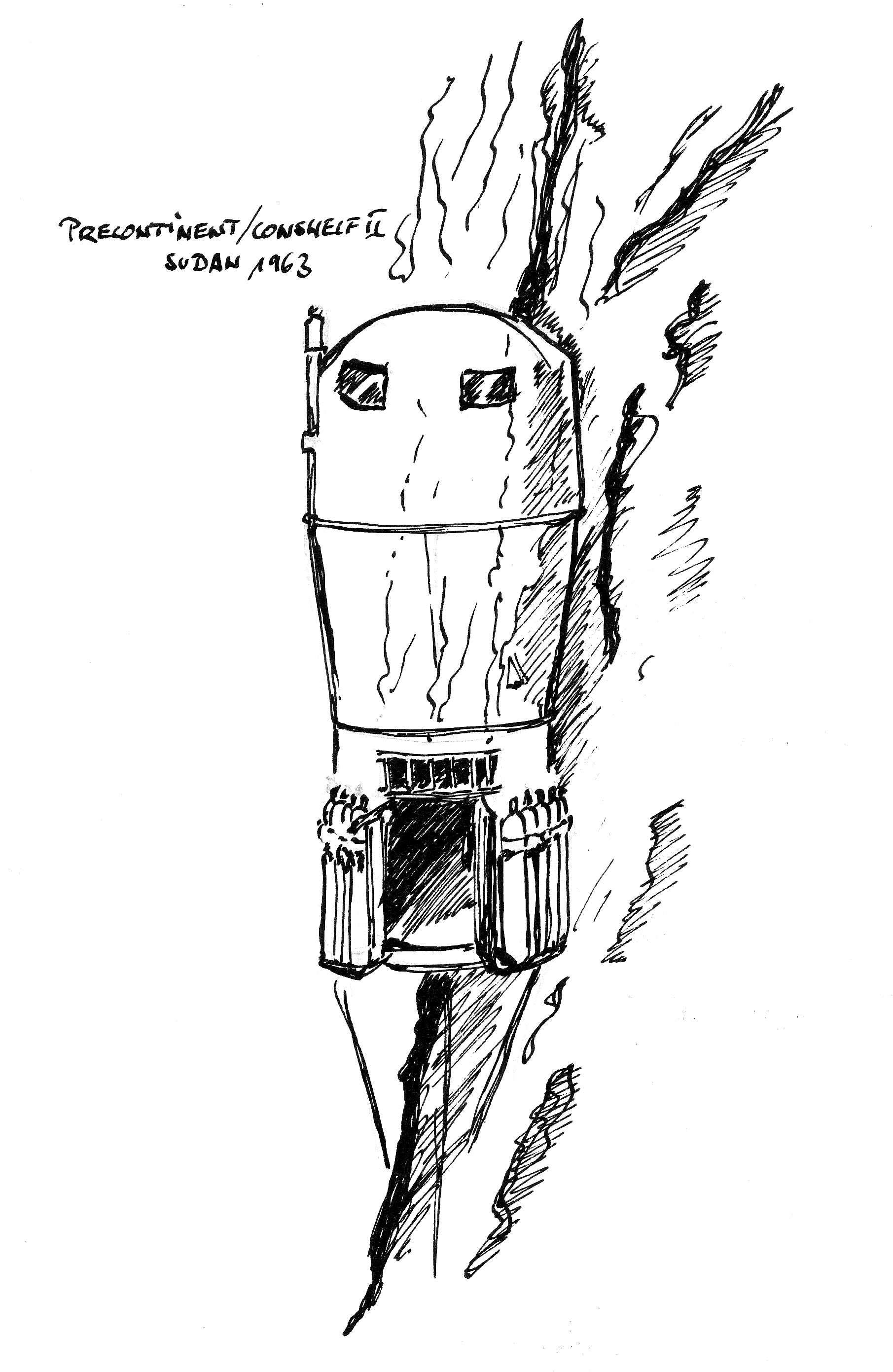
Deep Lab

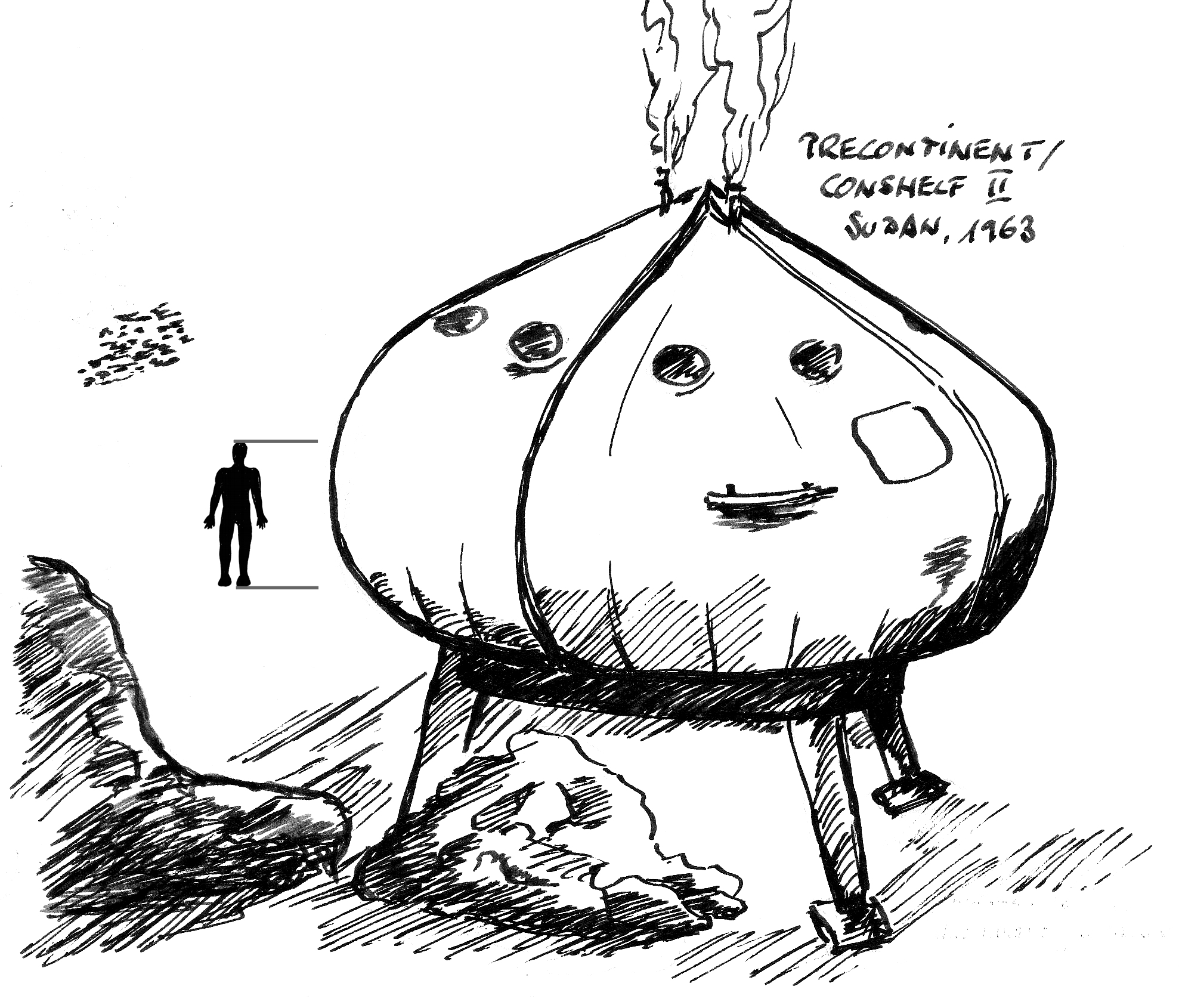
Garage

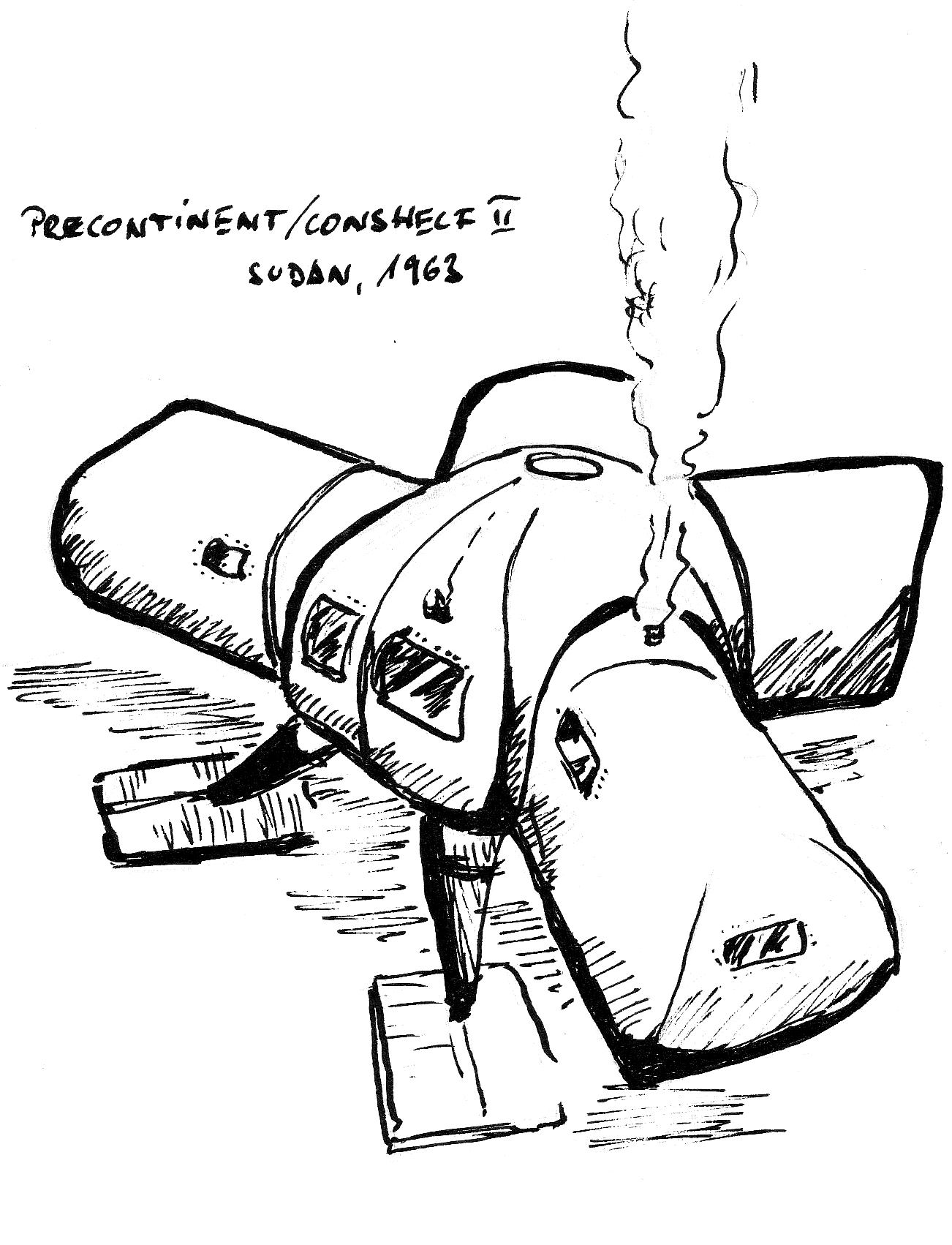
Starfish House

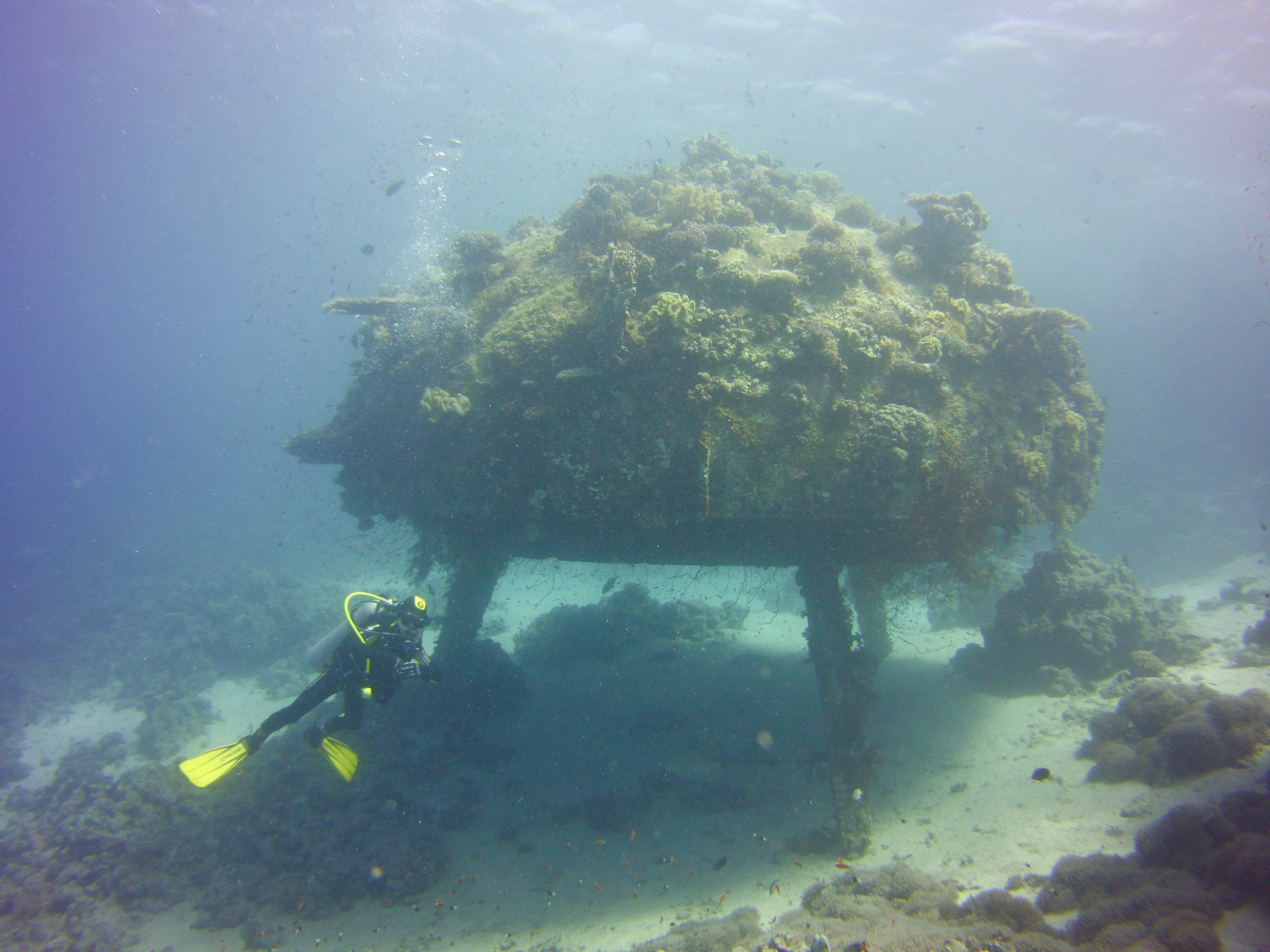
Front view, 2017

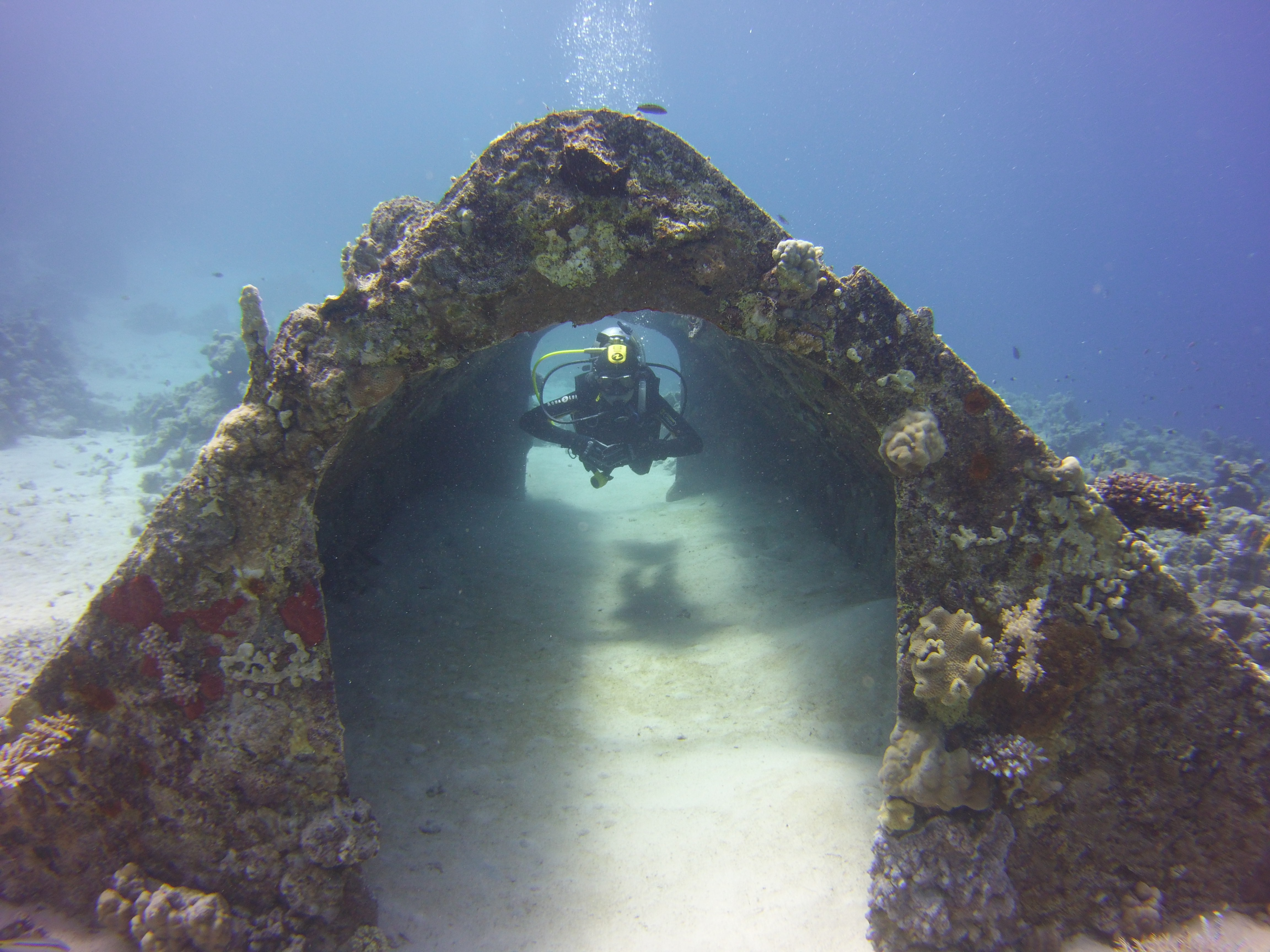
Toolshed, 2017

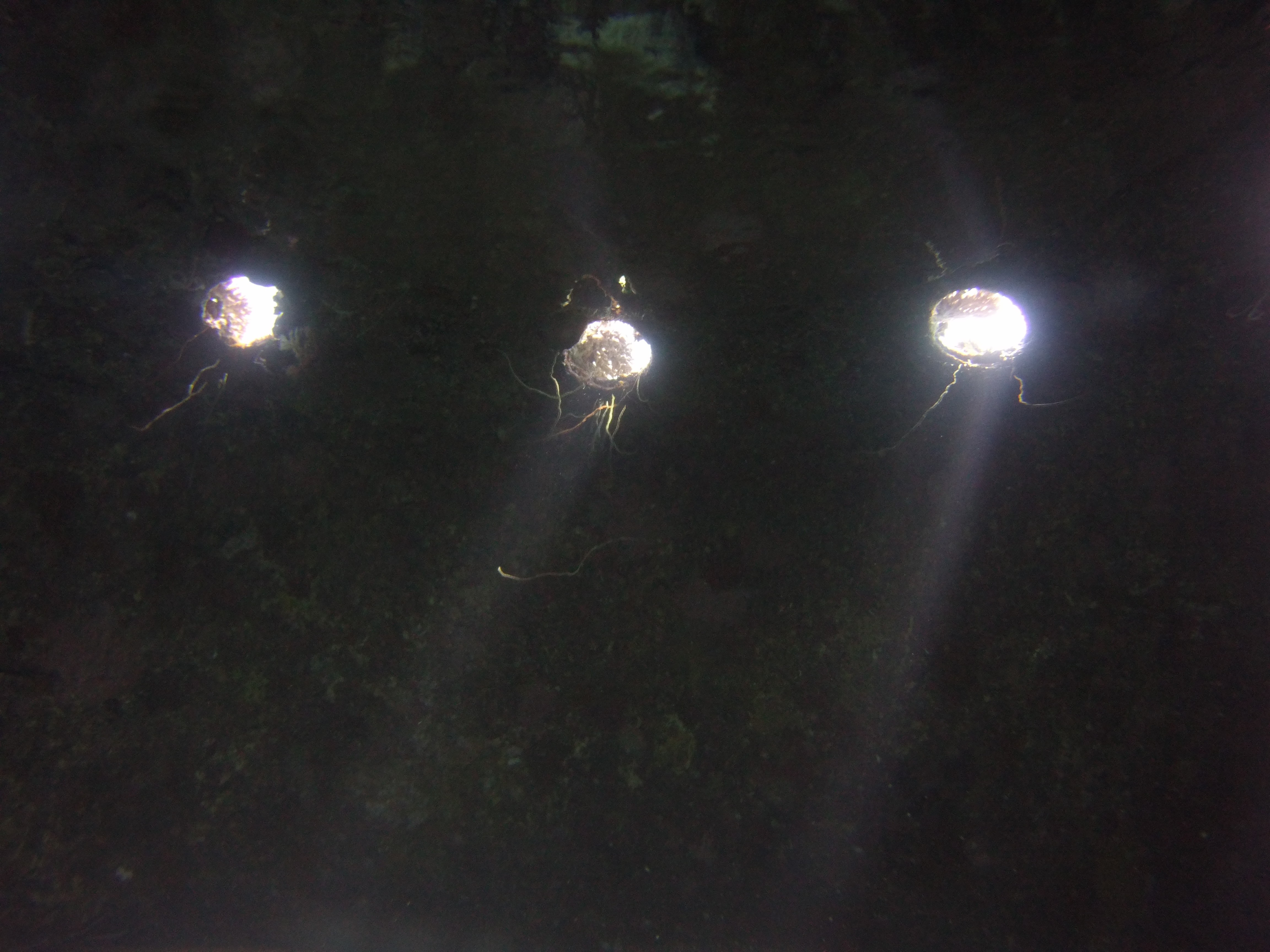
Inside view, 2017

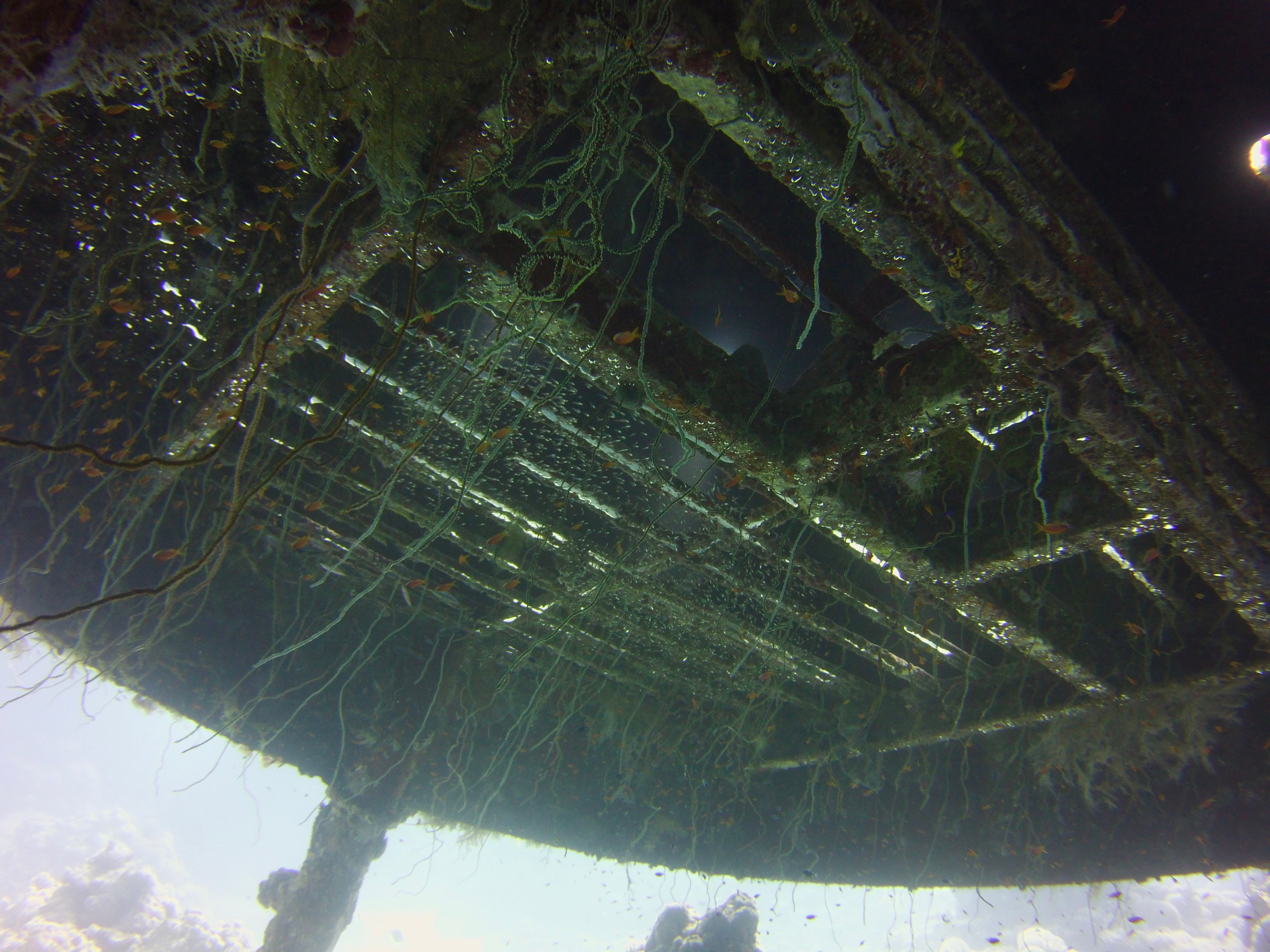
Bottom view, 2017

== Precontinent III ==
Such colonies did not find a productive future, however, as Cousteau, after forming Conshelf Three a few years later, withdrew his support for such exploitation of the sea and put his efforts toward conservation. It was also found in later years that industrial tasks underwater could be more efficiently performed by undersea robot devices and divers operating from the surface or from smaller lowered structures, made possible by a more advanced understanding of diving physiology and more complex mixtures of breathing gases.

Conshelf III

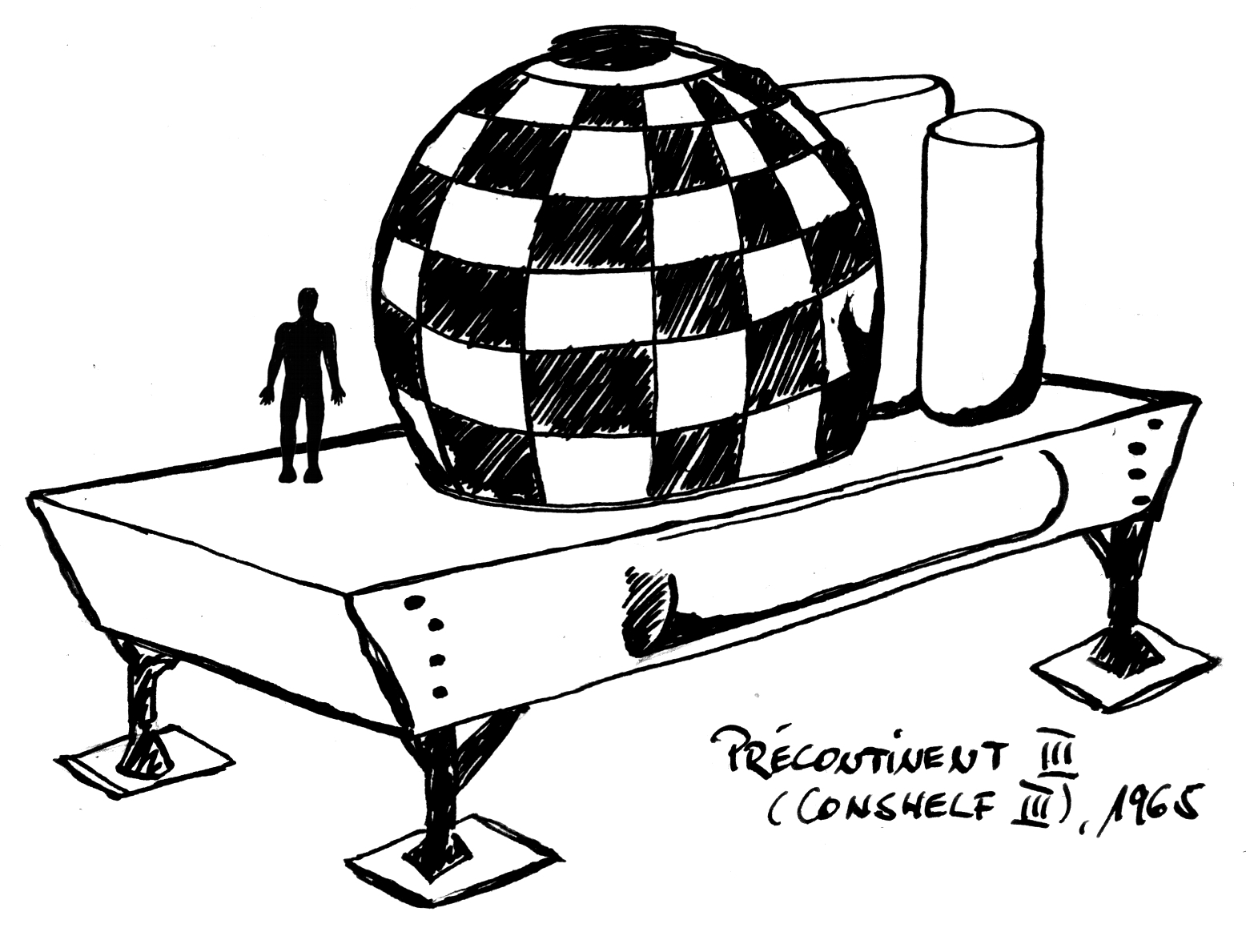
Conshelf III Underwater Habitat

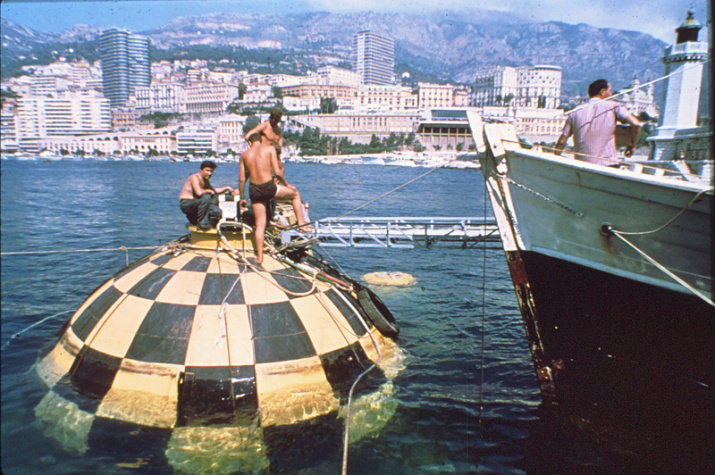
Conshelf III photo

== See also ==
- Underwater habitat – Human habitable underwater enclosure filled with breathable gas
- Aquanaut – Diver who remains at depth underwater for longer than 24 hours
- SEALAB – Experimental underwater habitats developed by the United States Navy
- NEEMO – NASA Extreme Environment Mission Operation project

== Bibliography ==
- Miller, James (1995). Living and Working in the Sea. Plymouth, VT: Five Corners Publications, Ltd. ISBN 1886699011.
