= Vladimir Kosarev =

Russian footballer

Personal information
- Full name: Vladimir Vladilenovich Kosarev
- Date of birth: 4 April 1959 (age 67)
- Place of birth: Russia
- Height: 1.85 m (6 ft 1 in)
- Positions: Midfielder; striker

Senior career*
Years	Team	Apps	(Gls)
1976–1980	Luch	25+	(4+)
1981	Amur	31	(1)
1982	Spartak (Moscow)	0	(0)
1982	→ Spartak (Kostroma) (loan)	27	(1)
1983–1987	Shinnik	173	(6)
1988–1990	Luch	74	(13)
1990–1992	Omonia Aradippou		
- * Club domestic league appearances and goals

Vladimir Vladilenovich Kosarev (Russian: Влади́мир Владиле́нович Ко́сарев; born 4 April 1959) is a Russian former footballer who played as a midfielder or striker.

== Career ==
Kosarev started his career with Soviet third-tier side Luch. Before the 1982 season, he signed for Spartak (Moscow) in the Soviet top flight. In 1982, Kosarev was sent on loan to Soviet second-tier club Spartak (Kostroma). Before the 1988 season, he returned to Luch in the Soviet third tier, where he suffered relegation to the Soviet fourth tier.

In 1990, Kosarev signed for Cypriot top flight team Omonia Aradippou, becoming the first Russian player to play in the country.
