= Vladimir Korenev =

Russian actor (1940–2021)

- Korenev in Amphibian Man (1962)
- Born: Vladimir Borisovich Korenev; 20 June 1940; Sevastopol, USSR
- Died: 2 January 2021 (aged 80); Moscow, Russia
- Resting place: Moscow
- Occupation: Actor
- Years active: 1962–2020
- Spouse: Alla Konstantinova
- Children: Irina Koreneva

Vladimir Borisovich Korenev (Russian: Влади́мир Бори́сович Ко́ренев; 20 June 1940 – 2 January 2021) was a Soviet and Russian film and theatre actor and teacher, known for The Amphibian Man (1962). He was awarded People's Artist of Russia in 1998.

== Early life and education ==
Korenev was born on 20 June 1940, in Sevastopol, in the family of Rear Admiral Boris Leonidovich Korenev. He lived in Izmail until the family moved to Tallinn, where he became interested in literature and theater. Classmate Larisa Luzhina led Vladimir to drama club, directed by Ivan Danilovich Rossomahin. The circle also engaged Vitali Konyayev, Igor Yasulovich and Lillian Malkina.

In 1957, he enrolled in the Russian Institute of Theatre Arts in the studio of People's Artist of the RSFSR Gregory Konskiy and People's Artist of the USSR Olga Androvskaya.

== Career ==
Korenev became famous in the 1960s, when he played the lead role of Ichthyander in the film The Amphibian Man, and became known as a sex symbol in the Soviet Union.

In 1961, he joined the troupe of the Moscow Drama Theatre (Stanislavsky and Nemirovich-Danchenko Theatre), where he was invited by Mikhail Yanshin, who led the theatre at the time.

At the 19th edition of the Sozvezdie International Film Festival in 2011, Korenev, who was at the time artistic director at the Institute for Humanitarian Education and still acting at the Stanislavsky Moscow Drama Theatre, was chair of the festival.

By 2015, Koronev had become artistic director of the Faculty of Theatre Arts Abbot in Institute of Humanitarian Education and Information Technologies.

== Honours ==
He was awarded People's Artist of Russia in 1998.

== Death ==
In 2020, the actor tested positive for COVID-19 amidst the COVID-19 pandemic in Russia. Korenev died from COVID-19 in Moscow on 2 January 2021.

== Filmography ==
- 1962: Amphibian Man as Ichtyandr Salvator
- 1965: The Light of a Distant Star as Viktor, Zavyalov's nephew
- 1965: Children of Don Quixote as Viktor Bondarenko
- 1971: Liberation (part 4) as Neustroyev
- 1973: Much Ado About Nothing as Don Juan
- 1973: The Great Battle as Stepan Neustroev
- 1976: Champion as Valentin Kareyev
- 1977: Rudin as Konstantin Pandayevskiy
- 1980: I, Actress as Roshchin-Insarov
- 1989: Criminal Talent (TV Movie) as Sergey Sergeevich Kurikin
- 1991: Unknown Pages of Life Scout as Willy Walecki
- 2004: Children of the Arbat (TV Series) as Yuri Sharok's father
- 2015: Orlova and Alexandrov (TV Series) as Vladimir Nemirovich-Danchenko
