= Fridrikh Ermler =

Soviet film director, actor, and screenwriter

- Фридрих Эрмлер
- Born: Vulf Movshevich Breslav; May 13, 1898; Rezhitsa, Vitebsk Governorate, Russian Empire (present-day Latvia)
- Died: July 12, 1967 (aged 69); Komarovo, Russian SFSR, Soviet Union
- Other name: Vladimir Mikhaylovich Breslav
- Occupations: Film director, actor, screenwriter

Fridrikh Markovich Ermler (Note: Russian: Фридрих Маркович Эрмлер, romanized: Fridrikh Markovich Ermler; Born Vulf Movshevich Breslav (Russian: Вульф Мовшевич Бреслав, romanized: Vulf Movshevich Breslav); Later known as Vladimir Mikhaylovich Breslav (Russian: Владимир Михайлович Бреслав, romanized: Vladimir Mikhaylovich Breslav)) (13 May 1898 – 12 July 1967) was a Soviet film director, actor, and screenwriter. He was a four-time recipient of the Stalin Prize (in 1941, twice in 1946, and in 1951).

After studying pharmacology, he joined the Czarist army in 1917 and soon took part in the October Revolution on the side of the Bolshevists. Captured and tortured by the White army, he only became a full party member at the end of the Civil War.

From 1923 to 1924 Ermler studied at the Cinema Academy. In 1932 he took part in creating one of the first Soviet talkies – the movie Vstrechny (The Counterplan). He also was one of the founders of the Creative Association KEM (together with E. Ioganson). In 1929-1931 Ermler studied at the Communist Academy and wrote for the newspaper Kino. He also became the chairman of the Russian Association of Revolutionary Filmmakers.

In 1940 he became the director of the Lenfilm studio. Between 1941 and 1944, he worked at the Central United Film Studio of Feature Films (TsOKS) in Alma-Ata (now Kazakhfilm Film Studio).

He died on 12 July 1967, in Komarovo. A memorial plaque was placed on the house in Leningrad where he lived from 1930 to 1962.

== Filmography ==
- Scarlet Fever (Скарлатина) (1924); short
- Children of the Storm (Дети бури) (1926); co-directed with Eduard Ioganson
- Katka's Reinette Apples (Катька – Бумажный Ранет) (1926); co-directed with Eduard Ioganson
- The Parisian Cobbler (Парижский сапожник) (1927)
- The House in the Snow-Drifts (Дом в сугробах) (1928)
- Fragment of an Empire (Обломок империи) (1929)
- Counterplan (Встречный) (1932); co-directed with Sergei Yutkevich
- Peasants (Крестьяне) (1934)
- The Great Citizen (Великий гражданин) (1937–1938) – Stalin Prize second degree (1941)
- Balzac in Russia (Бальзак в России) (1940)
- Autumn (Осень) (1940); short, co-directed with Isaak Menaker
- She Defends the Motherland (Она защищает Родину), also released as No Greater Love (1943) – Stalin Prize second degree (1946)
- The Turning Point (Великий перелом) (1945) – Stalin Prize first degree (1946)
- The Great Force (Великая сила) (1949) – Stalin Prize third degree (1951)
- Dinner Time (Званый ужин) (1953)
- Unfinished Story (Неоконченная повесть) (1955)
- The First Day (День первый) (1958)
- From New York to Yasnaya Poliana (Из Нью-Йорка в Ясную Поляну) (1963); documentary
- Facing the Judgment of History (Перед судом истории) (1965); documentary/interview with Vasily Shulgin
