= List of biographical films pre-1960s =

The following is a list of biographical films released before 1960.

== 1900s ==
=== 1900 ===
Film	Subject(s)	Lead actor or actress
Joan of Arc	Joan of Arc	Jeanne Claviere

=== 1906 ===
Film	Subject(s)	Lead actor or actress
The Story of the Kelly Gang	Ned Kelly	Frank Mills

=== 1909 ===
Film	Subject(s)	Lead actor or actress
The Origin of Beethoven's Moonlight Sonata	Ludwig van Beethoven	Harry Baur
The Life of Moses.	Moses	Pat Hartigan
Edgar Allen Poe	Edgar Allan Poe	Herbert Yost
Saul and David	King David	Maurice Costello
Saul and David	King Saul	William V. Ranous

== 1910s ==
=== 1910 ===
Film	Subject(s)	Lead actor or actress
Pyotr Velikiy	Peter the Great	Pyotr Voinov

=== 1911 ===
Film	Subject(s)	Lead actor or actress
Sweet Nell of Old Drury	Nell Gwyn	Nellie Stewart
Sweet Nell of Old Drury	Charles II of England	Augustus Neville

=== 1912 ===
Film	Subject(s)	Lead actor or actress
Custer's Last Fight.	George Armstrong Custer	Francis Ford
Cleopatra	Cleopatra	Helen Gardner
From the Manger to the Cross	Jesus	Robert Henderson-Bland

=== 1913 ===
Film	Subject(s)	Lead actor or actress
Adrienne Lecouvreur	Adrienne Lecouvreur	Sarah Bernhardt
Giuseppe Verdi nella vita e nella gloria	Giuseppe Verdi	Egisto Cecchi
The Life and Works of Richard Wagner	Richard Wagner	Giuseppe Becce
Sixty Years a Queen	Queen Victoria	Blanche Forsythe (younger) Louie Henri (older)

=== 1914 ===
Film	Subject(s)	Lead actor or actress
Beating Back	Al Jennings	Al Jennings
Richelieu	Cardinal Richelieu	Murdock MacQuarrie
The Adventures of François Villon: The Oubliette	François Villon	Murdock MacQuarrie
The Adventures of François Villon: The Higher Law	François Villon	Murdock MacQuarrie
The Adventures of François Villon: Monsieur Bluebeard	François Villon	Murdock MacQuarrie
The Adventures of François Villon: The Ninety Black Boxes	François Villon	Murdock MacQuarrie
Home, Sweet Home	John Howard Payne	Henry B. Walthall
Judith of Bethulia	Judith	Blanche Sweet
The Life of General Villa	Pancho Villa	Raoul Walsh (younger) Pancho Villa (older, as himself)

=== 1915 ===
Film	Subject(s)	Lead actor or actress
Florence Nightingale	Florence Nightingale	Elisabeth Risdon
Mistress Nell	Nell Gwyn	Mary Pickford
The Raven	Edgar Allan Poe	Henry B. Walthall

=== 1916 ===
Film	Subject(s)	Lead actor or actress
David Garrick.	David Garrick	Dustin Farnum
Davy Crockett	Davy Crockett	Dustin Farnum
Disraeli	Benjamin Disraeli	Dennis Eadie
Joan the Woman	Joan of Arc	Geraldine Farrar

=== 1917 ===
Film	Subject(s)	Lead actor or actress
Betsy Ross	Betsy Ross	Alice Brady
Cleopatra	Cleopatra	Theda Bara
The Conqueror	Sam Houston	William Farnum
The Fall of the Romanovs	Nicholas II	Alfred Hickman
The Fall of the Romanovs	Alexandra Feodorovna	Nance O'Neil
The Lincoln Cycle	Abraham Lincoln	Benjamin Chapin
My Father	Abraham Lincoln	Benjamin Chapin
My Mother	Abraham Lincoln	Benjamin Chapin
Myself	Abraham Lincoln	Benjamin Chapin
Rasputin, the Black Monk	Grigori Rasputin	Montagu Love

=== 1918 ===
Film	Subject(s)	Lead actor or actress
Casanova	Giacomo Casanova	Alfréd Deésy
My Four Years in Germany	James W. Gerard	Halbert Brown
The Life Story of David Lloyd George	David Lloyd George	Norman Page
Why America Will Win	John J. Pershing	Harris Gordon
The Woman the Germans Shot	Edith Cavell	Julia Arthur

=== 1919 ===
Film	Subject(s)	Lead actor or actress
Deliverance	Helen Keller	Ann Mason
The Fighting Roosevelts	Theodore Roosevelt	Herbert Bradshaw
Private Peat	Harold R. Peat	Harold R. Peat

== 1920s ==
=== 1920 ===
Film	Subject(s)	Lead actor or actress
Headin' Home	Babe Ruth	Babe Ruth
If I Were King	François Villon	William Farnum

=== 1921 ===
Film	Subject(s)	Lead actor or actress
Disraeli	Benjamin Disraeli	George Arliss

=== 1922 ===
Film	Subject(s)	Lead actor or actress
Dick Turpin's Ride to York	Dick Turpin	Matheson Lang
Nero	Nero	Jacques Grétillat
Peter the Great	Peter the Great	Emil Jannings
A Prince of Lovers	Lord Byron	Howard Gaye

=== 1923 ===
Film	Subject(s)	Lead actor or actress
Bonnie Prince Charlie	Charles Edward Stuart	Ivor Novello
Friedrich Schiller - Eine Dichterjugend	Friedrich Schiller	Theodor Loos
Guy Fawkes	Guy Fawkes	Matheson Lang
Landru, the Bluebeard of Paris	Henri Désiré Landru	Wilhelm Sichra
The Little Napoleon	Napoleon	Egon von Hagen
Paganini	Niccolò Paganini	Conrad Veidt
Richard the Lion-Hearted	Richard I	Wallace Beery
The Ten Commandments	Moses	Theodore Roberts
The Ten Commandments	Rameses II	Charles De Roche

=== 1924 ===
Film	Subject(s)	Lead actor or actress
Beau Brummel	Beau Brummel	John Barrymore
The Dramatic Life of Abraham Lincoln	Abraham Lincoln	George A. Billings

=== 1926 ===
Film	Subject(s)	Lead actor or actress
Davy Crockett at the Fall of the Alamo	Davy Crockett	Cullen Landis
Josef Kajetán Tyl	Josef Kajetán Tyl	Zdeněk Štěpánek
The Life Story of Charles Chaplin	Charlie Chaplin	Chick Wango
Nell Gwyn	Nell Gwyn	Dorothy Gish
Nelson	Horatio Nelson, 1st Viscount Nelson	Cedric Hardwicke

=== 1927 ===
Film	Subject(s)	Lead actor or actress
The King of Kings	Jesus	H. B. Warner
The Loves of Casanova	Giacomo Casanova	Ivan Mozzhukhin
The Life of Beethoven	Ludwig van Beethoven	Fritz Kortner
Napoléon	Napoleon Bonaparte	Albert Dieudonné

=== 1928 ===
Film	Subject(s)	Lead actor or actress
Dream of Love	Adrienne Lecouvreur	Joan Crawford
Luther	Martin Luther	Eugen Klöpfer
The Passion of Joan of Arc	Joan of Arc	Renée Jeanne Falconetti
The Patriot	Tsar Paul I of Russia	Emil Jannings
Tracy the Outlaw	Harry Tracy	Jack Hoy
Una nueva y gloriosa nación	Manuel Belgrano	Francis X. Bushman

=== 1929 ===
Film	Subject(s)	Lead actor or actress
The Divine Lady	Emma Hamilton	Corinne Griffith
The Divine Lady	Lord Horatio Nelson	Victor Varconi
Disraeli	Benjamin Disraeli	George Arliss

== 1930s ==
=== 1930 ===
Film	Subject(s)	Lead actor or actress
Abraham Lincoln	Abraham Lincoln	Walter Huston
Billy the Kid	Billy the Kid	Johnny Mack Brown
A Lady's Morals	Jenny Lind	Grace Moore
The Loves of Robert Burns	Robert Burns	Joseph Hislop
Ludwig der Zweite, König von Bayern	Ludwig II of Bavaria	William Dieterle

=== 1931 ===
Film	Subject(s)	Lead actor or actress
Alexander Hamilton	Alexander Hamilton	George Arliss
Dreyfus	Alfred Dreyfus	Cedric Hardwicke
Mata Hari	Mata Hari	Greta Garbo
Yorck	Ludwig Yorck von Wartenburg	Werner Krauss

=== 1932 ===
Film	Subject(s)	Lead actor or actress
Jenny Lind	Jenny Lind	Grace Moore
Rasputin and the Empress	Grigori Rasputin	Lionel Barrymore
Rasputin and the Empress	Alexandra Feodorovna	Ethel Barrymore
Rasputin and the Empress	Nicholas II	Ralph Morgan
Silver Dollar	Yates Martin	Edward G. Robinson

=== 1933 ===
Film	Subject(s)	Lead actor or actress
The Bowery	Chuck Connors	Wallace Beery
The Bowery	Steve Brodie	George Raft
In the Wake of the Bounty	William Bligh	Mayne Lynton
In the Wake of the Bounty	Fletcher Christian	Errol Flynn
The Private Life of Henry VIII	Henry VIII	Charles Laughton
Queen Christina	Queen Christina of Sweden	Greta Garbo
Voltaire	Voltaire	George Arliss

=== 1934 ===
Film	Subject(s)	Lead actor or actress
The Barretts of Wimpole Street	Elizabeth Barrett Browning	Norma Shearer
The Barretts of Wimpole Street	Robert Browning	Fredric March
Cleopatra	Cleopatra	Claudette Colbert
Cleopatra	Julius Caesar	Warren William
Cleopatra	Mark Antony	Henry Wilcoxon
The House of Rothschild	Mayer Rothschild	George Arliss
The Iron Duke	Arthur Wellesley, 1st Duke of Wellington	George Arliss
Love Time	Franz Schubert	Nils Asther
Madame Du Barry	Madame Du Barry	Dolores del Río
Madame Du Barry	Louis XV	Reginald Owen
The Mighty Barnum	P. T. Barnum	Wallace Beery
Nell Gwynn	Nell Gwynn	Anna Neagle
The Rise of Catherine the Great	Catherine the Great	Elisabeth Bergner
The Scarlet Empress	Catherine the Great	Marlene Dietrich
Waltzes from Vienna	Johann Strauss	Edmund Gwenn
Waltzes from Vienna	Johann Strauss II	Esmond Knight
Viva Villa!	Pancho Villa	Wallace Beery

=== 1935 ===
Film	Subject(s)	Lead actor or actress
Annie Oakley	Annie Oakley	Barbara Stanwyck
Clive of India	Robert Clive, 1st Baron Clive	Ronald Colman
Diamond Jim	Jim Brady	Edward Arnold
Drake of England	Francis Drake	Matheson Lang
Golgotha	Jesus	Robert Le Vigan
Harmony Lane	Stephen Foster	Douglass Montgomery
Mutiny on the Bounty	William Bligh	Charles Laughton
Mutiny on the Bounty	Fletcher Christian	Clark Gable

=== 1936 ===
Film	Subject(s)	Lead actor or actress
Daniel Boone	Daniel Boone	George O'Brien
Der Kaiser von Kalifornien	John Sutter	Luis Trenker
The Great Ziegfeld	Florenz Ziegfeld Jr.	William Powell
Hearts Divided	Elizabeth 'Betsy' Patterson	Marion Davies
Hearts Divided	Jérôme Bonaparte	Dick Powell
Hearts Divided	Napoleon Bonaparte	Claude Rains
Mary of Scotland	Mary, Queen of Scots	Katharine Hepburn
The Plainsman	Wild Bill Hickok	Gary Cooper
The Prisoner of Shark Island	Samuel Mudd	Warner Baxter
Rembrandt	Rembrandt	Charles Laughton
Rhodes of Africa	Cecil Rhodes	Walter Huston
Robin Hood of El Dorado	Joaquin Murrieta	Warner Baxter
The Story of Louis Pasteur	Louis Pasteur	Paul Muni
Sutter's Gold	John Sutter	Edward Arnold
Whom the Gods Love	Wolfgang Amadeus Mozart	Stephen Haggard
The White Angel	Florence Nightingale	Kay Francis

=== 1937 ===
Film	Subject(s)	Lead actor or actress
Auld Lang Syne	Robert Burns	Andrew Cruickshank
Fire Over England	Elizabeth I	Flora Robson
The Great Garrick	David Garrick	Brian Aherne
The Life of Émile Zola	Émile Zola	Paul Muni
Parnell	Charles Stewart Parnell	Clark Gable
Peter the First	Peter the Great	Nikolai Simonov
The Toast of New York	James Fisk	Edward Arnold
Victoria the Great	Queen Victoria	Anna Neagle
William Tindale	William Tyndale	Alan Wheatley
Young Pushkin	Alexander Pushkin	Valentin Litovsky

=== 1938 ===
Film	Subject(s)	Lead actor or actress
Adrienne Lecouvreur	Adrienne Lecouvreur	Yvonne Printemps
The Adventures of Marco Polo	Marco Polo	Gary Cooper
Alexander Nevsky	Alexander Nevsky	Nikolay Cherkasov
Boys Town	Edward J. Flanagan	Spencer Tracy
The Buccaneer	Jean Lafitte	Fredric March
The Buccaneer	Andrew Jackson	Hugh Sothern
The Childhood of Maxim Gorky	Maxim Gorky	Aleksei Lyarsky
The Great Waltz	Johann Strauss II	Fernand Gravey
If I Were King	François Villon	Ronald Colman
Marie Antoinette	Marie Antoinette	Norma Shearer
That Mothers Might Live	Ignaz Semmelweis	Shepperd Strudwick
Saint Theresa of Lisieux	Thérèse of Lisieux	Irène Corday
Sixty Glorious Years	Queen Victoria	Anna Neagle
Suez	Ferdinand de Lesseps	Tyrone Power

=== 1939 ===
Film	Subject(s)	Lead actor or actress
Conquest of Peter the Great	Peter the Great	Nikolai Simonov
Drums Along the Mohawk	Nicholas Herkimer	Roger Imhof
The Flying Irishman	Douglas Corrigan	Douglas Corrigan
Frontier Marshal	Wyatt Earp	Randolph Scott
The Great Victor Herbert	Victor Herbert	Allan Jones
Immortal Waltz	Johann Strauss I	Paul Hörbiger
Jesse James	Jesse James	Tyrone Power
Jesse James	Frank James	Henry Fonda
Juarez	Benito Juárez	Paul Muni
Kaiss wa leila	Qays	Badr Lama
Kaiss wa leila	Layla Al-Aamiriya	Amina Rizk
Lenin in 1918	Vladimir Lenin	Boris Shchukin
The Mad Empress	Charlotte of Belgium	Medea de Novara
Man of Conquest	Sam Houston	Richard Dix
Nurse Edith Cavell	Edith Cavell	Anna Neagle
On His Own	Maxim Gorky	Aleksei Lyarsky
The Private Lives of Elizabeth and Essex	Elizabeth I	Bette Davis
The Private Lives of Elizabeth and Essex	Robert Devereux, 2nd Earl of Essex	Errol Flynn
The Story of Alexander Graham Bell	Alexander Graham Bell	Don Ameche
The Story of Alexander Graham Bell	Thomas A. Watson	Henry Fonda
The Story of Vernon and Irene Castle	Vernon Castle	Fred Astaire
The Story of Vernon and Irene Castle	Irene Castle	Ginger Rogers
Swanee River	Stephen Foster	Don Ameche
Tower of London	Richard III of England	Basil Rathbone
Young Mr. Lincoln	Abraham Lincoln	Henry Fonda

== 1940s ==
=== 1940 ===
Film	Subject(s)	Lead actor or actress
Spirit of the People	Abraham Lincoln	Raymond Massey
Bismarck	Otto von Bismarck	Paul Hartmann
Brigham Young	Brigham Young	Dean Jagger
Brigham Young	Joseph Smith	Vincent Price
A Dispatch from Reuter's	Paul Reuter	Edward G. Robinson
Dr. Ehrlich's Magic Bullet	Paul Ehrlich	Edward G. Robinson
Edison, the Man	Thomas Edison	Spencer Tracy
Eternal Melodies	Wolfgang Amadeus Mozart	Gino Cervi
Kit Carson	Kit Carson	Jon Hall
Knute Rockne, All American	Knute Rockne	Pat O'Brien
Knute Rockne, All American	George Gipp	Ronald Reagan
Lillian Russell	Lillian Russell	Alice Faye
Lillian Russell	Alexander Pollock Moore	Henry Fonda
Lady with Red Hair	Mrs. Leslie Carter	Miriam Hopkins
Northwest Passage	Robert Rogers	Spencer Tracy
Rambrandt	Rembrandt	Jules Verstraete
The Return of Frank James	Frank James	Henry Fonda
The Rothschilds	Nathan Mayer Rothschild	Carl Kuhlmann
Santa Fe Trail	J. E. B. Stuart	Errol Flynn
Santa Fe Trail	George Armstrong Custer	Ronald Reagan
Santa Fe Trail	John Brown	Raymond Massey
Semmelweis	Ignaz Semmelweis	Tivadar Uray
The Westerner	Judge Roy Bean	Walter Brennan
Young Tom Edison	Thomas Edison	Mickey Rooney

=== 1941 ===
Film	Subject(s)	Lead actor or actress
Belle Starr	Belle Starr	Gene Tierney
Billy the Kid	Billy the Kid	Robert Taylor
Blossoms in the Dust	Edna Gladney	Greer Garson
Hudson's Bay	Pierre-Esprit Radisson	Paul Muni
Hudson's Bay	Médard des Groseilliers	Laird Cregar
Men of Boys Town	Edward J. Flanagan	Spencer Tracy
Ohm Kruger	Paul Kruger	Emil Jannings
One Foot in Heaven	William Spence	Fredric March
The Prime Minister	Benjamin Disraeli	John Gielgud
Sergeant York	Alvin York	Gary Cooper
Sikander	Alexander the Great	Prithviraj Kapoor
Sikander	Porus	Sohrab Modi
That Hamilton Woman	Emma Hamilton	Vivien Leigh
That Hamilton Woman	Lord Horatio Nelson	Laurence Olivier
They Died with Their Boots On	George Armstrong Custer	Errol Flynn
You Will Remember	Leslie Stuart	Robert Morley

=== 1942 ===
Film	Subject(s)	Lead actor or actress
Apache Trail	Tom O'Folliard	William Lundigan
Die Entlassung	Otto von Bismarck	Emil Jannings
The First of the Few	R. J. Mitchell	Leslie Howard
For Me and My Gal	Harry Palmer	Gene Kelly
Gentleman Jim	James J. Corbett	Errol Flynn
The Great Mr. Handel	George Frideric Handel	Wilfrid Lawson
Here Will I Nest	Thomas Talbot	John Sullivan
The Loves of Edgar Allan Poe	Edgar Allan Poe	Shepperd Strudwick
My Gal Sal	Paul Dresser	Victor Mature
The Pride of the Yankees	Lou Gehrig	Gary Cooper
The Remarkable Andrew	Andrew Jackson	Brian Donlevy
Rembrandt	Rembrandt	Ewald Balser
Rossini	Gioachino Rossini	Nino Besozzi
Simón Bolívar	Simón Bolívar	Julián Soler
Tennessee Johnson	Andrew Johnson	Van Heflin
Tombstone, the Town Too Tough to Die	Wyatt Earp	Richard Dix
The Vanishing Virginian	Robert Yancey	Frank Morgan
Yankee Doodle Dandy	George M. Cohan	James Cagney
Yankee Doodle Dandy	Sam Harris	Richard Whorf
The Young Mr. Pitt	William Pitt the Younger	Robert Donat

=== 1943 ===
Film	Subject(s)	Lead actor or actress
Der Unendliche Weg	Friedrich List	Eugen Klöpfer
Dixie	Daniel Decatur Emmett	Bing Crosby
Hitler's Madman	Reinhard Heydrich	John Carradine
The Iron Major	Frank Cavanaugh	Pat O'Brien
Is Everybody Happy?	Ted Lewis	Michael Duane
Jack London	Jack London	Michael O'Shea
Madame Curie	Marie Curie	Greer Garson
Madame Curie	Pierre Curie	Walter Pidgeon
Mission to Moscow	Joseph E. Davies	Walter Huston
The Outlaw	Billy the Kid	Jack Buetel
The Song of Bernadette	Bernadette Soubirous	Jennifer Jones
The Woman of the Town	Bat Masterson	Albert Dekker

=== 1944 ===
Film	Subject(s)	Lead actor or actress
The Adventures of Mark Twain	Mark Twain	Fredric March
Buffalo Bill	Buffalo Bill	Joel McCrea
Champagne Charlie	George Leybourne	Tommy Trinder
Champagne Charlie	Alfred Vance	Stanley Holloway
Enemy of Women	Joseph Goebbels	Paul Andor
The Great Moment	William T. G. Morton	Joel McCrea
Henry V	Henry V of England	Laurence Olivier
The Hitler Gang	Adolf Hitler	Robert Watson
Shine On, Harvest Moon	Nora Bayes	Ann Sheridan
Shine On, Harvest Moon	Jack Norworth	Dennis Morgan
Wilson	Woodrow Wilson	Alexander Knox

=== 1945 ===
Film	Subject(s)	Lead actor or actress
Caesar and Cleopatra	Julius Caesar	Claude Rains
Caesar and Cleopatra	Cleopatra	Vivien Leigh
Captain Eddie	Eddie Rickenbacker	Fred MacMurray
Captain Kidd	William Kidd	Charles Laughton
Dillinger	John Dillinger	Lawrence Tierney
François Villon	François Villon	Serge Reggiani
The Dolly Sisters	Janszieka "Jenny" Dolly	Betty Grable
The Dolly Sisters	Rozsika "Rosie" Dolly	June Haver
The Great John L.	John L. Sullivan	Greg McClure
God Is My Co-Pilot	Robert Lee Scott Jr.	Dennis Morgan
Incendiary Blonde	Texas Guinan	Betty Hutton
Ivan the Terrible	Ivan the Terrible	Nikolay Cherkasov
Pride of the Marines	Al Schmid	John Garfield
Rhapsody in Blue	George Gershwin	Robert Alda
A Royal Scandal	Catherine the Great	Tallulah Bankhead
A Song to Remember	Frédéric Chopin	Cornel Wilde

=== 1946 ===
Film	Subject(s)	Lead actor or actress
Anna and the King of Siam	Anna Leonowens	Irene Dunne
Camões	Luís de Camões	António Vilar
Devotion	Charlotte Brontë	Olivia de Havilland
Devotion	Emily Brontë	Ida Lupino
Devotion	Anne Brontë	Nancy Coleman
Gallant Journey	John Joseph Montgomery	Glenn Ford
The Great Glinka	Mikhail Glinka	Boris Chirkov
The Jolson Story	Al Jolson	Larry Parks
The Magic Bow	Niccolò Paganini	Stewart Granger
Magnificent Doll	Dolley Madison	Ginger Rogers
Magnificent Doll	James Madison	Burgess Meredith
Magnificent Doll	Aaron Burr	David Niven
My Darling Clementine	Wyatt Earp	Henry Fonda
Night and Day	Cole Porter	Cary Grant
The Razor's Edge	W. Somerset Maugham	Herbert Marshall
Sister Kenny	Elizabeth Kenny	Rosalind Russell
So Goes My Love	Hiram Percy Maxim	Don Ameche
Till the Clouds Roll By	Jerome Kern	Robert Walker

=== 1947 ===
Film	Subject(s)	Lead actor or actress
Albéniz	Isaac Albéniz	Pedro López Lagar
Captain Boycott	Charles Boycott	Cecil Parker
Captain Boycott	Charles Stewart Parnell	Robert Donat
The Fabulous Dorseys	Tommy and Jimmy Dorsey	Tommy and Jimmy Dorsey
Monsieur Vincent	Vincent de Paul	Pierre Fresnay
My Wild Irish Rose	Chauncey Olcott	Dennis Morgan
The Perils of Pauline	Pearl White	Betty Hutton
Seine einzige Liebe	Franz Schubert	Franz Böheim
Song of Love	Clara Schumann	Katharine Hepburn
Song of Love	Robert Schumann	Paul Henreid
Song of Scheherazade	Nikolai Rimsky-Korsakov	Jean-Pierre Aumont
Trail Street	Bat Masterson	Randolph Scott

=== 1948 ===
Film	Subject(s)	Lead actor or actress
The Babe Ruth Story	Babe Ruth	William Bendix
Bonnie Prince Charlie	Charles Edward Stuart	David Niven
Brindis a Manolete	Manolete	Pedro Ortega
The Iron Curtain	Igor Gouzenko	Dana Andrews
Joan of Arc	Joan of Arc	Ingrid Bergman
The Lame Devil (Le Diable boiteux)	Talleyrand	Sacha Guitry
Macbeth	Macbeth of Scotland	Orson Welles
Man to Men	Henry Dunant	Jean-Louis Barrault
Saraband	Philip Christoph von Königsmarck	Stewart Granger
The Mozart Story	Wolfgang Amadeus Mozart	Hans Holt
Up in Central Park	William Tweed	Vincent Price
Words and Music	Richard Rodgers	Tom Drake
Words and Music	Lorenz Hart	Mickey Rooney

=== 1949 ===
Film	Subject(s)	Lead actor or actress
Alexander Popov	Alexander Stepanovich Popov	Nikolay Cherkasov
Almafuerte	Pedro Bonifacio Palacios	Narciso Ibáñez Menta
The Bad Lord Byron	Lord Byron	Dennis Price
Christopher Columbus	Christopher Columbus	Fredric March
Docteur Laennec	René Laennec	Pierre Blanchar
Eroica	Ludwig van Beethoven	Ewald Balser
Heaven over the Marshes	Maria Goretti	Inés Orsini
Hen. Gregorio del Pilar	Gregorio del Pilar	Jose Padilla Jr.
I Shot Jesse James	Jesse James	Reed Hadley
I Shot Jesse James	Frank James	Tom Tyler
Ivan Pavlov	Ivan Pavlov	Aleksandr Borisov
Jolson Sings Again	Al Jolson	Larry Parks
Life of St. Paul Series	Paul the Apostle	Nelson Leigh
Orpopojan valssi	J. Alfred Tanner	Sakari Halonen
Padre Burgos	Jose Burgos	Jaime de la Rosa
Samson and Delilah	Samson	Victor Mature
Samson and Delilah	Delilah	Hedy Lamarr
The Stratton Story	Monty Stratton	James Stewart
Viennese Girls	Karl Michael Ziehrer	Willi Forst

== 1950s ==
=== 1950 ===
Film	Subject(s)	Lead actor or actress
The Bells of Nagasaki	Takashi Nagai	Masao Wakahara
The Du Pont Story	Éleuthère Irénée du Pont	Eduard Franz
Genghis Khan	Genghis Khan	Manuel Conde
The Jackie Robinson Story	Jackie Robinson	Jackie Robinson
The Life of Wu Xun	Wu Xun	Zhao Dan
Mussorgsky	Modest Mussorgsky	Aleksandr Borisov
The Paris Waltz	Hortense Schneider	Yvonne Printemps
The Paris Waltz	Jacques Offenbach	Pierre Fresnay
Over the Waves	Juventino Rosas	Pedro Infante
Three Little Words	Bert Kalmar	Fred Astaire
Three Little Words	Harry Ruby	Red Skelton
Zhukovsky	Nikolay Yegorovich Zhukovsky	Yuri Yurovsky

=== 1951 ===
Film	Subject(s)	Lead actor or actress
David	David Rees Griffiths	D. R. Griffiths
The Desert Fox: The Story of Rommel	Erwin Rommel	James Mason
Follow the Sun	Ben Hogan	Glenn Ford
Follow the Sun	Valerie Hogan	Anne Baxter
Golden Girl	Lotta Crabtree	Mitzi Gaynor
The Great Caruso	Enrico Caruso	Mario Lanza (older); Peter Edward Price (young)
The Harlem Globetrotters	Abe Saperstein	Thomas Gomez
I'll See You in My Dreams	Grace Leboy	Doris Day
I'll See You in My Dreams	Gus Kahn	Danny Thomas
Jim Thorpe – All-American	Jim Thorpe	Burt Lancaster (older); Billy Gray (young)
The Magic Box	William Friese-Greene	Robert Donat
Maria Theresa	Maria Theresa	Paula Wessely
Messalina	Messalina	María Félix
Monsieur Fabre	Jean-Henri Fabre	Pierre Fresnay
Murder in the Cathedral	Thomas Becket	John Groser
Przhevalsky	Nikolay Przhevalsky	Sergei Papov
Taras Shevchenko	Taras Shevchenko	Sergei Bondarchuk
Valentino	Rudolph Valentino	Anthony Dexter
Vienna Waltzes	Millie Trampusch	Marte Harell
Vienna Waltzes	Johann Strauss I	Anton Walbrook

=== 1952 ===
Film	Subject(s)	Lead actor or actress
Above and Beyond	Paul Tibbets	Robert Taylor
Above and Beyond	Lucy Tibbets	Eleanor Parker
Brothers of Italy	Nazario Sauro	Ettore Manni
Carbine Williams	David Marshall Williams	James Stewart
The Composer Glinka	Mikhail Glinka	Boris Smirnov
Immortal Melodies	Pietro Mascagni	Pierre Cressoy
Immortal Melodies	Lina Carbognani	Carla Del Poggio
The Iron Mistress	James Bowie	Alan Ladd
Little Aurore's Tragedy	Aurore Gagnon	Yvonne Laflamme
No Greater Love	Bertha von Suttner	Hilde Krahl
No Greater Love	Arthur von Suttner	Dieter Borsche
The Novel of My Life	Luciano Tajoli	Luciano Tajoli
The Pride of St. Louis	Dizzy Dean	Dan Dailey
Stars and Stripes Forever	John Philip Sousa	Clifton Webb
The Story of Will Rogers	Will Rogers	Will Rogers Jr.
Tico-Tico no Fubá	Zequinha de Abreu	Anselmo Duarte
Viva Zapata!	Emiliano Zapata	Marlon Brando
The Winning Team	Grover Cleveland Alexander	Ronald Reagan
With a Song in My Heart	Jane Froman	Susan Hayward

=== 1953 ===
Film	Subject(s)	Lead actor or actress
Admiral Ushakov	Fyodor Ushakov	Ivan Pereverzev
Attack from the Sea	Fyodor Ushakov	Ivan Pereverzev
Belinsky	Vissarion Belinsky	Sergei Kurilov
Crazylegs	Elroy Hirsch	Elroy Hirsch
The Dark World	Âşık Veysel	Âşık Veysel
The Eddie Cantor Story	Eddie Cantor	Keefe Brasselle (older); Daddy Dewdrop (young)
Endless Horizons	Hélène Boucher	Gisèle Pascal
Franz Schubert	Franz Schubert	Heinrich Schweiger
Hostile Whirlwinds	Felix Dzerzhinsky	Vladimir Yemelyanov
Houdini	Harry Houdini	Tony Curtis
Houdini	Bess Houdini	Janet Leigh
Jambyl	Jambyl Jabayev	Shaken Aimanov
The Joe Louis Story	Joe Louis	Coley Wallace
Melba	Nellie Melba	Patrice Munsel
Nero and the Burning of Rome	Nero	Gino Cervi
Rimsky-Korsakov	Nikolai Rimsky-Korsakov	Grigori Belov
Rob Roy: The Highland Rogue	Rob Roy MacGregor	Richard Todd
The Secret of Blood	Jan Janský	Vladimír Ráž
So This Is Love	Grace Moore	Kathryn Grayson
Verdi, the King of Melody	Giuseppe Verdi	Pierre Cressoy
Young Bess	Elizabeth I	Jean Simmons
Young Bess	Thomas Seymour	Stewart Granger
Young Bess	Catherine Parr	Deborah Kerr
Young Bess	Henry VIII	Charles Laughton
The Soldier of Victory	Karol Świerczewski	Józef Wyszomirski

=== 1954 ===
Film	Subject(s)	Lead actor or actress
Attila	Attila	Anthony Quinn
Attila	Honoria	Sophia Loren
Attila	Aetius	Henri Vidal
The Bob Mathias Story	Bob Mathias	Bob Mathias
Canaris	Wilhelm Canaris	O. E. Hasse
Deep in My Heart	Sigmund Romberg	José Ferrer
Deep in My Heart	Dorothy Donnelly	Merle Oberon
Désirée	Désirée Clary	Jean Simmons
Désirée	Napoleon	Marlon Brando
Ernst Thälmann	Ernst Thälmann	Günther Simon
The Eternal Waltz	Johann Strauss II	Bernhard Wicki
The Glenn Miller Story	Glenn Miller	James Stewart
Hungarian Rhapsody	Carolyne zu Sayn-Wittgenstein	Colette Marchand
Hungarian Rhapsody	Franz Liszt	Paul Hubschmid
The Life of Surgeon Sauerbruch	Ferdinand Sauerbruch	Ewald Balser
Mirza Ghalib	Mirza Ghalib	Bharat Bhushan
Theodora, Slave Empress	Theodora	Gianna Maria Canale
Vipra Narayana	Vipra Narayana	Akkineni Nageswara Rao

=== 1955 ===
Film	Subject(s)	Lead actor or actress
Adriana Lecouvreur	Adrienne Lecouvreur	Valentina Cortese
Anarkali	Anarkali	Anjali Devi
Anarkali	Salim	Akkineni Nageswara Rao
Andrea Chénier	André Chénier	Michel Auclair
Beautiful but Dangerous	Lina Cavalieri	Gina Lollobrigida
The Court-Martial of Billy Mitchell	Billy Mitchell	Gary Cooper
Chief Crazy Horse	Crazy Horse	Victor Mature
Count Aquila	Federico Confalonieri	Rossano Brazzi
The Dark Avenger	Edward the Black Prince	Errol Flynn
The Eternal Sea	John Hoskins	Sterling Hayden
I'll Cry Tomorrow	Lillian Roth	Susan Hayward
Interrupted Melody	Marjorie Lawrence	Eleanor Parker
Interrupted Melody	Dr. Thomas King	Glenn Ford
The Last Ten Days	Adolf Hitler	Albin Skoda
Lola Montès	Lola Montez	Martine Carol
The Long Gray Line	Martin Maher	Tyrone Power
Love Me or Leave Me	Ruth Etting	Doris Day
Ludwig II	Ludwig II of Bavaria	O. W. Fischer
Mikhaylo Lomonosov	Mikhail Lomonosov	Boris Livanov
Mulu Manek	Mulu Manek	Arvind Pandya
Music in the Blood	Kutte Widmann	Viktor de Kowa
Napoléon	Napoleon	Raymond Pellegrin (older); Daniel Gélin (young)
Ein Polterabend	Adolf Glassbrenner	Rolf Moebius
Prince of Players	Edwin Booth	Richard Burton (older); Christopher Cook (young)
Rani Rasmani	Rani Rashmoni	Molina Devi
Road to Life	Anton Makarenko	Vladimir Yemelyanov
The Seven Little Foys	Eddie Foy	Bob Hope
Sissi	Empress Elisabeth of Austria	Romy Schneider
The Virgin Queen	Elizabeth I	Bette Davis
The Virgin Queen	Walter Raleigh	Richard Todd

=== 1956 ===
Film	Subject(s)	Lead actor or actress
The Benny Goodman Story	Benny Goodman	Steve Allen
The Benny Goodman Story	Alice Hammond	Donna Reed
The Best Things in Life Are Free	Buddy DeSylva	Gordon MacRae
The Best Things in Life Are Free	Ray Henderson	Dan Dailey
The Best Things in Life Are Free	Lew Brown	Ernest Borgnine
The Captain from Köpenick	Wilhelm Voigt	Heinz Rühmann
The Eddy Duchin Story	Eddy Duchin	Tyrone Power
The Eddy Duchin Story	Marjorie Oelrichs	Kim Novak
Kean: Genius or Scoundrel	Edmund Kean	Vittorio Gassman
Lust for Life	Vincent van Gogh	Kirk Douglas
Reach for the Sky	Douglas Bader	Kenneth More
Sissi – The Young Empress	Empress Elisabeth of Austria	Romy Schneider
Somebody Up There Likes Me	Rocky Graziano	Paul Newman
Thomas Muentzer	Thomas Müntzer	Wolfgang Stumpf
The Trapp Family	Maria von Trapp	Ruth Leuwerik
The Trapp Family	Georg von Trapp	Hans Holt

=== 1957 ===
Film	Subject(s)	Lead actor or actress
After the Ball	Vesta Tilley	Pat Kirkwood
After the Ball	Walter de Frece	Laurence Harvey
Alfonsina	Alfonsina Storni	Amelia Bence
Baby Face Nelson	Baby Face Nelson	Mickey Rooney
The Barretts of Wimpole Street	Elizabeth Barrett	Jennifer Jones
The Barretts of Wimpole Street	Edward Moulton-Barrett	John Gielgud
The Barretts of Wimpole Street	Robert Browning	Bill Travers
Battle Hymn	Dean Hess	Rock Hudson
The Buster Keaton Story	Buster Keaton	Donald O'Connor
Fear Strikes Out	Jimmy Piersall	Anthony Perkins
The Flying Dutchman	Anthony Fokker	Ton Kuyl
The Helen Morgan Story	Helen Morgan	Ann Blyth
Jeanne Eagels	Jeanne Eagels	Kim Novak
The Joker Is Wild	Joe E. Lewis	Frank Sinatra
The Joker Is Wild	Martha Stewart	Mitzi Gaynor
Man of a Thousand Faces	Lon Chaney	James Cagney
Monkey on My Back	Barney Ross	Cameron Mitchell
Nilachaley Mahaprabhu	Chaitanya Mahaprabhu	Asim Kumar
The One That Got Away	Franz von Werra	Hardy Krüger
Panduranga Mahatyam	Pundalik	N. T. Rama Rao
Queen Louise	Königin Luise	Ruth Leuwerik
Queen Louise	König Friedrich Wilhelm	Dieter Borsche
Road to the Stars	Konstantin Tsiolkovsky	Giorgy Solovyov
Sissi – Fateful Years of an Empress	Empress Elisabeth of Austria	Romy Schneider
The Spirit of St. Louis	Charles Lindbergh	James Stewart
The Star of Africa	Hans-Joachim Marseille	Joachim Hansen
Stories About Lenin	Vladimir Lenin	Maksim Shtraukh
Stresemann	Gustav Stresemann	Ernst Schröder
The True Story of Jesse James	Jesse James	Robert Wagner

=== 1958 ===
Film	Subject(s)	Lead actor or actress
The Csardas King	Emmerich Kálmán	Gerhard Riedmann
I Accuse!	Alfred Dreyfus	José Ferrer
Jamila, the Algerian	Djamila Bouhired	Magda
Machine-Gun Kelly	George "Machine Gun" Kelly	Charles Bronson
Montparnasse 19	Amedeo Modigliani	Gérard Philipe
October Days	Vladimir Lenin	Vladimir Chestnokov
Sebastian Kneipp	Sebastian Kneipp	Carl Wery
A Song Goes Round the World	Joseph Schmidt	Hans Reiser
Tilman Riemenschneider	Tilman Riemenschneider	Emil Stöhr
Too Much, Too Soon	Diana Barrymore	Dorothy Malone
The Trapp Family in America	Maria von Trapp	Ruth Leuwerik
The Trapp Family in America	Georg von Trapp	Hans Holt
The True Story of Lynn Stuart	Lynn Stuart	Betsy Palmer

=== 1959 ===
Film	Subject(s)	Lead actor or actress
Al Capone	Al Capone	Rod Steiger
Beloved Infidel	F. Scott Fitzgerald	Gregory Peck
Beloved Infidel	Sheilah Graham	Deborah Kerr
Bouboulina	Laskarina Bouboulina	Irene Papas
The Diary of Anne Frank	Anne Frank	Millie Perkins
The Five Pennies	Red Nichols	Danny Kaye
The Gene Krupa Story	Gene Krupa	Sal Mineo
Hannibal	Hannibal	Victor Mature
Herod the Great	Herod the Great	Edmund Purdom
Iriston's Son	Kosta Khetagurov	Vladimir Tkhapsaev
John Paul Jones	John Paul Jones	Robert Stack
Solomon and Sheba	Solomon	Yul Brynner
Solomon and Sheba	Queen of Sheba	Gina Lollobrigida
Vasily Surikov	Vasily Surikov	Yevgeni Lazarev
Veerapandiya Kattabomman	Veerapandiya Kattabomman	Sivaji Ganesan

== See also ==
- Lists of biographical films
