= List of Soviet films of 1949 =

A list of films produced in the Soviet Union in 1949 (see 1949 in film).

== 1949 ==
| Title | Original title | Director | Cast | Genre | Notes |
|---|---|---|---|---|---|
1949
| Alexander Popov | Александр Попов | Viktor Eisymont and Gerbert Rappaport | Nikolai Cherkasov, Yefim Kopelyan, Aleksandr Borisov, Bruno Freindlich, Yury Tolubeyev, Osip Abdulov | Biopic | |
| Alitet Leaves for the Hills | Алитет уходит в горы | Mark Donskoy | Andrei Abrikosov | Drama | |
| The Battle of Stalingrad | Сталинградская битва | Vladimir Petrov | Aleksei Dikiy | War film | |
| Cossacks of the Kuban | Кубанские казаки | Ivan Pyryev | Marina Ladynina | | |
| Encounter at the Elbe | Встреча на Эльбе | Grigori Aleksandrov and Aleksei Utkin | Vladlen Davydov, Konstantin Nassonov, Boris Andreyev, Lyubov Orlova, Faina Ranevskaya | War film | |
| Happy Flight | Счастливый рейс | Vladimir Nemolyayev | Nikolay Kryuchkov, Mikhail Zharov, Vera Orlova, Vladimir Popov | Musical comedy | |
| Ivan Pavlov | Академик Иван Павлов | Grigori Roshal | Aleksandr Borisov, Nina Alisova, Nikolai Plotnikov, Maryana Safonova | Biopic | |
| The Star | Звезда | Aleksandr Ivanov | | | |
| They Have a Motherland | У них есть Родина | Aleksandr Faintsimmer, Vladimir Legoshin | Natasha Zashchipina | Drama | |

== See also ==
- 1949 in the Soviet Union
