= Vasily Shvetsov =

Vasily Ivanovich Shvetsov
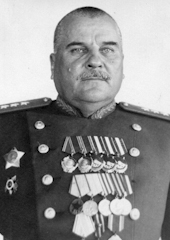
- Shvetsov after his 1954 promotion to colonel general
- Born: 12 March 1898; Lykovskaya, Novgorod Governorate, Russian Empire
- Died: 1 October 1958 (aged 60) Leningrad, Soviet Union
- Allegiance: Russian SFSR; Soviet Union
- Branch: Red Army (Soviet Army from 1946)
- Service years: 1919–1958
- Rank: Colonel general
- Commands: 29th Army; 4th Shock Army; 21st Army; 23rd Army; 25th Army; 39th Army
- Conflicts: Russian Civil War; World War II
- Awards: Order of Lenin (2)

Vasily Ivanovich Shvetsov (Russian: Васи́лий Ива́нович Швецо́в; 12 March 1898 – 1 October 1958) was a Soviet Army colonel general who rose to field army command during World War II.

After fighting in the Russian Civil War as an ordinary soldier, Shvetsov became an officer training instructor and rose to command the 133rd Rifle Division by the beginning of World War II. After leading the division in the Battle of Moscow, he rose to command the 29th Army in the Battles of Rzhev. After the lack of success in the latter Shvetsov was reduced to deputy commander of the 3rd Shock Army, but after his leadership of a group of the army during the Battle of Velikiye Luki in late 1942 and early 1943 he returned to army command, leading the 4th Shock Army into eastern Belorussia in late 1943. After the unsuccessful performance of the army in these actions, Shvetsov briefly commanded the 21st Army and then served as its deputy commander. He commanded the 23rd Army in the final operations of the Continuation War. Postwar, Shvetsov continued to hold army command and rose to first deputy commander of the Baltic Military District before his death.

== Early life and Russian Civil War ==
The son of peasants, Vasily Ivanovich Shvetsov was born on 12 March 1898 in the village of Lykovskaya, Cherepovetsky Uyezd, Novgorod Governorate. After graduating from the Vakhonkino two-year ministerial school, Shvetsov worked as a carpenter on the construction of the Murmansk Railroad bridges at the Shonguy siding and the Kola station. In June 1918 he was sent as a delegate to the All-Road Workers Congress in Petrozavodsk, where he was elected chairman of the Main Railroad Inspection Commission of the Murmansk Railroad Directorate.

During the Russian Civil War, Shvetsov joined the Red Army on 12 October 1919 and became a Red Army man at the Moscow Military Engineer Courses. From July 1920 he studied at the Petrograd Military Engineer Command Personnel Tekhnikum of the Petrograd Military District. As part of a consolidated student brigade he fought as a squad leader on the Southern Front against the Army of Wrangel and the Makhnovites near Orekhov, Gulyai-Pole, Aleksandrovsk, and Melitopol. After graduating from the tekhnikum in January 1921 he was appointed a class commander in the 6th Petrograd Military Engineer Courses. As a platoon commander in the consolidated student brigade drawn from these courses Shvetsov took part in the suppression of the Kronstadt rebellion, then from May 1921 commanded a battalion of the 6th Talitsa Signals Command Personnel Courses of the Ural Military District. For distinguishing himself in combat, Shvetsov was awarded the Order of the Red Banner in 1921.

== Interwar period ==
After the end of the war, in January 1922 Shvetsov became commander of a battalion of the 2nd Vladikavkaz Signals Command Personnel Courses of the North Caucasus Military District. In June of that year, he was appointed a tactics instructor at the Petrograd Aviation Mechanics School. Shvetsov entered the Petrograd Higher Military Pedagogical School in September and after graduating in November 1923 was appointed an instructor at the 8th Petrograd Infantry School. He transferred to serve as a tactics instructor in the commanders section of the Novocherkassk Higher Cavalry School in October 1924. Shvetsov entered the Frunze Military Academy in September 1926, and after graduation in July 1929 was sent to the Ukrainian Military District to gain practical experience as assistant commander of the 132nd Donetsk Rifle Regiment of the 44th Rifle Division. In May 1930 Shvetsov was again sent to study at the Frunze Academy's eastern department. After graduation in May 1931 he remained at the academy as an instructor, serving as a senior tactics instructor before rising to head and military commissar of the 2nd course of the special department in July 1935. Shvetsov rose to serve as head of the Intelligence Officer Improvement Courses of the Intelligence Directorate in October 1935. On 15 September 1939 he was appointed commander of the new 133rd Rifle Division of the Siberian Military District. Shvetsov received the rank of major general on 4 June 1940.

== World War II ==
Just before Operation Barbarossa began, the 133rd Rifle Division was transferred west and from July held the line in the area of Dorogobuzh as part of the 24th Army of the Reserve Front. During August and September the division fought in the Yelnya offensive, and during the Battle of Moscow fought in sustained defensive battles on the Klin axis. The division was especially distinguished between 26 November and 4 December, when it repulsed the offensive of elements of the German 6th Panzer and 123rd Infantry Divisions. From 11 December, during the Kalinin offensive, Shvetsov commanded the 29th Army of the Kalinin Front. Under his command, the units of the army liberated Kalinin on 16 December in conjunction with the 31st Army. For this operation, Shvetsov was awarded the Order of Lenin. Between January and April 1942 he led the army in the Rzhev–Vyazma Offensive. In January, the army and other units of the front cut off German units. At the beginning of February due to a strong flanking German counterattack the 29th Army was itself cut off, but managed to break out with desperate efforts. After linking up with the 31st Army, the 29th Army continued defensive and offensive actions in the Battles of Rzhev. At the end of July and into August Shvetsov led the army in the Rzhev–Sychyovka offensive. Its units broke through the German defenses to a depth of up to 30 kilometers and reached the Volga in the sector east of the cities of Rzhev and Zubtsov. However, Shvetsov was relieved of command for "tolerating mistakes and inability to lead troops" in the area of the Gridino salient, and demoted to deputy commander of the 3rd Shock Army in September 1942.

From November 1942 to January 1943 Shvetsov commanded the Northern Operational Group of the army, advancing on Velikiye Luki during the Battle of Velikiye Luki. He was concussed on 15 February and remained in the hospital until 4 May, after which he was appointed commander of the 4th Shock Army. Shvetsov, promoted to lieutenant general on 16 October, led the army in the Nevel and Gorodok offensives. After the inconclusive Gorodok offensive, Shvetsov was relieved of command on 30 December and placed at the disposal of the Main Personnel Directorate for further assignment. He was appointed commander of the 21st Army on 25 February 1944, but replaced on 28 April by Dmitry Gusev. Shvetsov continued to serve with the 21st Army as its deputy commander. The army was sent to the Leningrad Front in April 1944. In the summer of 1944 the army took part in the Vyborg–Petrozavodsk offensive. Advancing on the main attack axis of the front along the Vyborg highway, the army broke through the Finnish defensive lines and took Vyborg on 20 June. On 3 July 1944 Shvetsov was appointed commander of the 23rd Army of the Leningrad Front, which fought in the elimination of the Finnish bridgehead on the Vuoksi. After the end of hostilities with Finland the army guarded the border on the Karelian Isthmus until the end of the war.

== Postwar ==
After the end of the war, Shvetsov continued to command the 23rd Army in the Leningrad Military District until its disbandment. In March 1947 he was sent to the Higher Academic Courses at the Voroshilov Higher Military Academy, which he graduated with honors on 20 April 1948. After graduating, Shvetsov was appointed commander of the 25th Army of the Primorsky Military District. He transferred to command the 39th Army of the Far Eastern Military District in May 1953, and was promoted to the rank of colonel general on 31 May 1954. Shvetsov was transferred west in September 1955 to serve as first deputy commander of the Baltic Military District. At the end of April 1958 he was seconded to Scientific-Research Group No. 1 of the General Staff. Shvetsov died on 1 October 1958 in Leningrad and was buried at the Alexander Nevsky Lavra in that city.

== Decorations ==
Shvetsov was a recipient of the following decorations:

- Order of Lenin (2)
- Order of the Red Banner (3)
- Order of Suvorov, 1st class
- Order of the Patriotic War, 1st class
