= Louisa Watson =

Louisa Watson may refer to

- Louisa Watson Peat (1883–1953), Irish-born writer and lecturer
- Louisa Brownfield (later Watson, born 1984), English netball player
