= Her Country's Call =

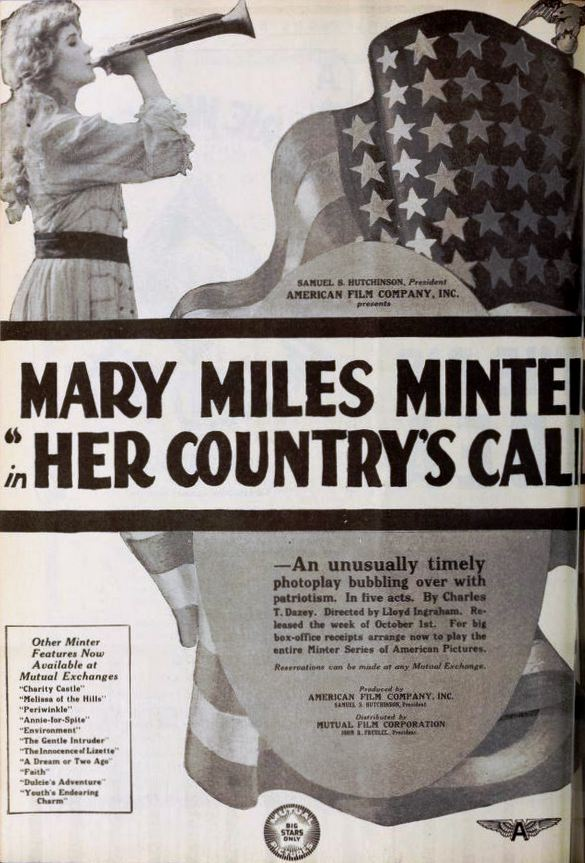
- Advertisement for film
- Directed by: Lloyd Ingraham
- Written by: Benjamin Chapin; Charles T. Dazey (scenario)
- Starring: Mary Miles Minter
- Distributed by: Mutual Film
- Release date: October 1, 1917 (United States)
- Running time: 5 reels
- Country: United States
- Language: Silent (English intertitles)

Her Country's Call is a 1917 American silent drama film directed by Lloyd Ingraham and starring Mary Miles Minter, along with George Periolat and Allan Forrest. The film is the final instalment in a series a films written by Abraham Lincoln impersonator Benjamin Chapin, who also appeared in the film as Lincoln. It was one of many films of the time that catered to the vogue for patriotic pictures after America joined World War I, with ample shots of soldiers and the American flag. As with many of Minter's features, it is thought to be a lost film.

== Plot ==
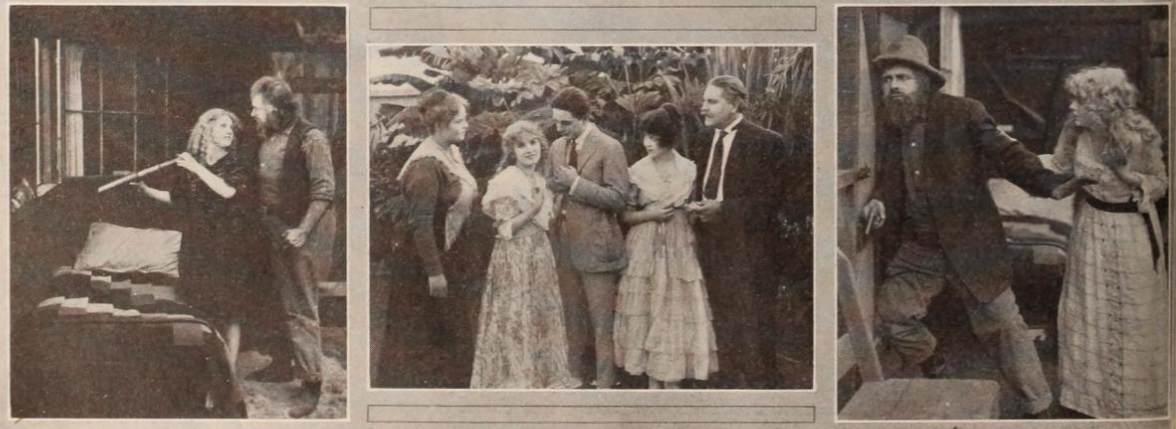
Mary Miles Minter in three scenes from "Her Country's Call" (1917)

As described in various film magazines, Jess Slocum, a little mountain girl, lives in a cabin with her father Jim. Jim Slocum hates the flag, and hates the soldiers that they can see drilling in the valley below, and when Jess asks him why, he explains that he was thrown out of camp fifteen years earlier for selling liquor to the soldiers. He tells Jess that he had his revenge, but does not elaborate further.

One day, Jess meets a soldier from the camp, Captain Neville, while he is fishing in a nearby stream. Attracted to the handsome soldier, she convinces her father to buy her a pretty new dress. While she is trying it on, secret service men open fire on the cabin, wounding Jess in the shoulder. Jim Slocum is arrested on the charge of moonshining, and Jess is taken to Captain Neville's house, to be nursed there by his sister. As she is recovering, Captain Neville teaches her to sound the bugle calls.

The girls of the town, led by the Colonel's daughter Marie, shun Jess due to her father's arrest and so, when she is well enough, she sets out to return to her old cabin. On the way she sees John Reynolds tear down the flag, and hears him plotting to raid the town while the soldiers are at a dance. Jess shoots him, then rides back to town and sounds the call to arms on the bugle. Reynolds and his raiders are defeated, and Colonel Tremaine receives a letter from Jim Slocum which finally reveals the nature of his old revenge; fifteen years ago, he stole the Colonel's baby daughter and raised her as his own. Thus Jess is the saviour of the town, and finds herself a new father, a new sister, and a handsome husband in Captain Neville.

== Cast ==
- Mary Miles Minter - Jess Slocum
- George Periolat - Jim Slocum
- Allan Forrest - Capt. Earle Neville
- Henry A. Barrows - Col. Tremaine
- Margaret Shelby - Marie Tremaine
- Ashton Dearholt - John Reynolds
- Benjamin Chapin - Abraham Lincoln

== Reception ==
Like many American films of the time, Her Country's Call was subject to cuts by city and state film censorship boards. The Chicago Board of Censors required a cut of the scenes of selling whiskey to an Indian and the shooting of a guard.
