= The Artamonov Business =

1925 novel by Maxim Gorky

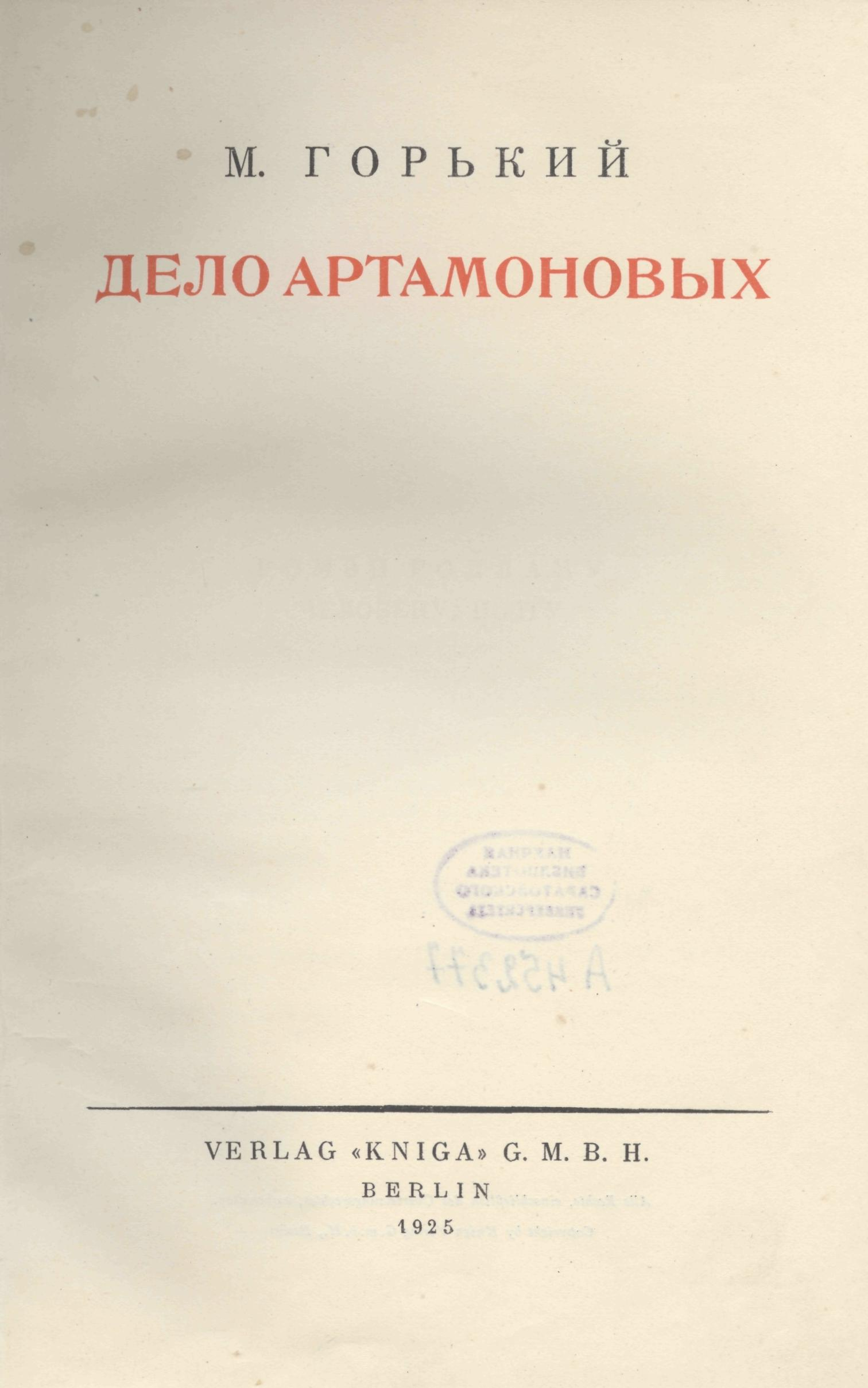
- Title page of the first edition (1925)
- Author: Maxim Gorky
- Original title: Дело Артамоновых
- Language: Russian
- Genre: Family chronicle, historical novel
- Publisher: Verlag "Kniga"
- Publication date: 1925
- Publication place: Italy / Germany

The Artamonov Business (Russian: Дело Артамоновых, romanized: Delo Artamonovykh), also translated as The Artamonovs or Decadence, is a novel by Maxim Gorky written during his 10-year emigration from Soviet Russia. It was published in Berlin in 1925 by Verlag "Kniga". Critics often call it Gorky's best novel, or best after The Life of Klim Samgin.

The plot concerns the three generations of a pre-revolutionary industrialist family, from the beginning of 1860s to the Revolution of 1917.

== Plot ==
Short after the abolition of serfdom in Russia in 1860s, Ilya Artamonov, a serf himself, moves to the provincial town of Dromov with his sons Peter and Nikita, and Aleksei, the adopted nephew. In Dromov, Ilya makes Peter to marry the mayor's daughter, Natalia Baimakova, and founds 'the Artamonov Business', the linen factory. After marrying Peter, Natalia losts all of her friends she had before because of the bad reputation of the Artamonov family they have in the town, as the locals view them as outsiders. Nikita secretly falls in love with her, but he doesn't tell her, and she suspects him as a spy put by the new husband. After a suicide attempt, Nikita leaves the family and enters a monastery. Ilya dies when helping his workers to build the factory, and Peter becomes in charge of 'the family business'.

After marrying Peter, Natalia lost all joys she had before, and Peter becomes the only close person to her. However, in their relationship they are not really close. Peter doesn't love her, and he himself is moody, clumsy and unsociable. By living with him, Natalia loses all her will to life. The only joy in the life of Peter is his son Ilya who becomes a student; Peter sees running the factory as his duty, but he feels nothing but disgust and maybe fear to it, and yet, it becomes the only purpose in his life. Peter insists that Ilya must inherit the family business because its the family duty, but Ilya refuses, and after quarreling with the father, Ilya leaves the family forever, and he is not to be ever encountered by Peter. Peter kills Ilya's friend whom he dislikes very much, "a scraggy little boy", by kicking him too hard; Aramonov's yardman Tikhon is the only person who knows about it, but he doesn't tell anyone, and even Peter doesn't know that he knows about it. The later plot is the history of disintegration of Peter's personality. At the end of his life, Peter retires from running the factory and completely isolates himself and falls into a sort of unconsciousness; his younger son Yakov becomes the head of the family business, but he gets murdered in 1917, after the February Revolution. One day, Peter wakes up and sees his home overtaken by Bolsheviks.

== Reception ==
D. S. Mirsky, the émigré critic and the author of The History of Russian Literature, who was very critical of Gorky before the novel came out, wrote that The Artamonov Business "is undoubtedly the best of Gorky's novels", and that "it belongs to one of the main traditions of Russian literature, to a great number of denunciations of Russian spiritual poverty, such as Oblomov, The Golovlyov Family and Bunin's The Village."

After the novel was translated by Veronica Dewey as Decadence in 1927, it was criticized in the English-language press. The New York Times wrote that "compared with Mother and others of the author's earlier works, his latest offering is weak in treatment, chaotic in texture, and loose in its grip upon its subject-matter", while Time wrote that although "it is honest, impersonal realism, thoughtful though morose", "author Gorky's powers, however fully displayed here, have produced books that were far more readable than this one.

Later, after the new two translations came out, The Artamonov Business by Alec Brown (in 1948), and The Artamonovs by Helen Altschuler (in 1952), it was given a good estimate. Alan Hodge wrote in the preface to Alec Brown's translation:

Of all Gorki's novels, The Artamonov Business is the most impressive and dramatic. Here in concentrated form is the tragic failure of Russia's middle classes in the decades before the Revolution, seen in the small-town microcosm of a family of textile-manufacturers. In this book Gorki displays at their best the power of creating character and the gift for managing scenes of energetic action which won world-wide admiration for his early stories. His distinctive blend of humour and tragedy, violence and pity, exuberance and introspection, is here put at the service of a grander and more moving theme than he had hitherto attempted.

Irwin Weil has called The Artamonov Business "perhaps Gorky's best single long work of fiction", while Richard Freeborn calls it Gorky's "best novel". Geoffrey Grigson wrote that "it is like a less sophisticated Buddenbrooks". Encyclopaedia Britannica calls The Artamonov Business "one of his [Gorky's] best novels".

== List of English translations ==
- Veronica Dewey (1927, as Decadence, published by Cassell & Co., reissued in 1984 by Bison Books with a foreword by Irwin Weil)
- Alec Brown (1948, as The Artamonov Business, published by Hamish Hamilton and Pantheon Books, reissued by Grosset & Dunlap and with illustrations by Heron Books in 1968)
- Helen Altschuler (1952, as The Artamonovs, published by Foreign Languages Publishing House, reissued by Folio Society with illustrations and by Liberty Book Club in 1955)

== Screen adaptations ==
- 1941 — The Artamonov Business, director Grigori Roshal.
- 1981 — Delo Artamonovykh, director Irina Sorokina (TV series).
