= In S. City =

1966 film

- Russian: В городе С.
- Directed by: Iosif Kheifits
- Written by: Iosif Kheifits
- Based on: Ionych by Anton Chekhov
- Produced by: Mikhail Gendenstein
- Starring: Andrei Popov; Anatoli Papanov; Igor Gorbachyov
- Music by: Nadezhda Simonyan
- Production company: Lenfilm
- Release date: 1966
- Running time: 97 min.
- Country: Soviet Union
- Language: Russian

In S. City (Russian: В городе С., romanized: V gorode S.) is a 1966 Soviet historical drama film directed by Iosif Kheifits. Film adaptation of Anton Chekhov's short story Ionych.

== Plot ==
The film tells about a young and dreamy doctor who moves to city S., where he becomes extremely bored.

== Cast ==
- Andrei Popov as Anton Pavlovich Chekhov
- Anatoli Papanov as Dmitry Ionovich Startsev
- Nonna Terentyeva as Yekaterina Ivanovna Turkina
- Lidiya Shtykan as Vera Iosifovna Turkina
- Igor Gorbachyov as Turkin
- Aleksey Batalov as Shergov
- Aleksandr Borisov as Puzyryov
- Grigory Shpigel as lawyer Losev
- Olga Aroseva as Maria Pavlovna Chekhova
- Leonid Bykov as carter
- Rina Zelyonaya as writer
- Ivan Krasko as writer
- Iya Savvina as lady with a dog
- Nikolai Sergeyev as ill man
- Aleksei Smirnov as man with a pineapple
- Roman Tkachuk as Volsky
