= Grebnev =

Grebnev (Russian: Гребнев) is a Russian male surname, its feminine counterpart is Grebneva. It may refer to

- Aleksandr Grebnev (born 1947), Russian association football player
- Anton Grebnev (born 1984), Russian association football player
- Grigorii Grebnev (1902–1960), Russian journalist and writer
- Oleg Grebnev (born 1968), Russian team handball player
