= Vladimir Balashov (actor) =

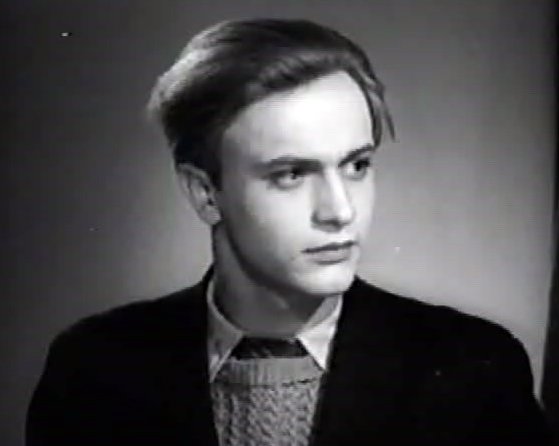
- Born: 10 July 1920
- Died: 23 December 1996 (aged 76); Moscow
- Occupation: Actor

Vladimir Pavlovich Balashov (Russian: Балашов Владимир Павлович; July 10, 1920, Izhevskoye, Spassky District, Ryazan Governorate, RSFSR – December 23, 1996, Moscow) was a Soviet theater and film actor. He was named an Honored Artist of the RSFSR in 1955. He was also named a Laureate of the Stalin Prize, First Class in 1951.

== Filmography ==
- The Oppenheim Family (1938)
- The Artamonov Business (1941)
- How the Steel Was Tempered (1942)
- Ivan the Terrible (1945)
- Girl No. 217 (1945)
- It Happened in the Donbas (1945)
- A Noisy Household (1946)
- The Vow (1946 film) (1946)
- Private Aleksandr Matrosov (1947)
- The Third Blow (1948)
- Ivan Pavlov (1949)
- Mussorgsky (1950)
- Maksimka (1953)
- Rimsky-Korsakov (1953)
- Commander of the Ship (1954)
- The Crash of the Emirate (1955)
- The Shadow Near the Pier (1955)
- Judgment of the Mad (1961)
- Year as Long as Life (1966)
- Sea Tales (1967)
- The Snow Maiden (1968)
- The Shield and the Sword (1968)
