= Osip Abdulov =

Soviet actor

Osip Naumovich Abdulov
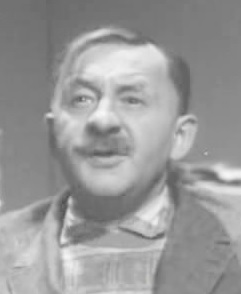
- Born: 16 November 1900 [O.S. 3 November] Łódź, Congress Poland, Russian Empire
- Died: 14 June 1953 (aged 52); Moscow, Russian SFSR, Soviet Union
- Occupations: Theater, radio, and film actor
- Years active: 1918 - 1953
- Spouse: Yelizaveta Moiseyevna Abdulova (née Shekhtman)
- Relatives: Vsevolod Abdulov (son)
- Awards: People's Artist of the RSFSR (1944); Order of the Red Banner of Labour (1949); Stalin Prize (1951)

Osip Naumovich Abdulov (Russian: Осип Наумович Абдулов; 16 November 1900 [O.S. 3 November] – 14 June 1953) — Soviet stage and film actor, director; People’s Artist of the RSFSR (1944), and recipient of the Stalin Prize, second class (1951).

== Biography ==
Osip Naumovich Abdulov was born to a Jewish family in Łódź, Poland (then part of the Russian Empire) in 1900. He briefly studied at Moscow University (now Moscow State University) in 1917 before turning his interest to acting.

Abdulov began working at the Shalyapin studio in 1918, where he had first performing role in 1919. He worked at various theaters in Moscow during the 1920s and 1930s and joined the company of the Theater of the Mossovet in 1943.

From 1929, he was engaged in teaching at the studio theatre of Yury Zavadsky, and later at GITIS. A close friend of Abdulov was Solomon Mikhoels, an actor and director of the Moscow State Jewish Theatre.

Abdulov additionally worked for Soviet radio broadcasting (first as an announcer and actor, then as a director) in 1924. He was involved in radio plays based on the dramatic works of Romain Rolland, Alphonse Daudet, Charles Dickens, Nikolay Gogol, and Maxim Gorky and took part in organizing artistic broadcasting for children. Abdulov worked as a news reader on Soviet radio during World War II.

Abdulov began to appear in films in 1933.

He became a People's Artist of the RSFSR in 1944. He was awarded the Order of the Red Banner of Labour in 1949 and a Stalin State Prize (second degree) in 1951.

Osip Abdulov's son Vsevolod Osipovich Abdulov (1942 - 2002) also became a notable actor. Both were interred at the Vvedenskoye Cemetery in Moscow.

== Notable roles ==
=== Theater roles ===
Year	Title	Playwright(s)	Role
1928	Enough Stupidity for Every Wise Man	Alexander Ostrovsky	Krupitsky
1933	The Devil's Disciple	George Bernard Shaw	General Burgoyne
1933	Wolves and Sheep	Alexander Ostrovsky	Lynyayev
1933	The School for Taxpayers	Louis Verneuil and Georges Berr	Fromanteel
1940	Without a Dowry	Alexander Ostrovsky	Knurov
1945	The Seagull	Anton Chekhov	Sorin
1945	The Cabinet Minister's Wife	Branislav Nušić	Uncle Vas
1950	Dawn Over Moscow	Anatoly Surov	Academician Ryzhov
1953	The Story of Turkey	Nâzım Hikmet	Old ashik

=== Film roles ===
Year	Title	Director(s)	Role
1936	The Last Night	Yuly Rayzman and Dmitri Ivanovich Vasilyev	Colonel
1936	The Dawn of Paris	Grigory Roshal	Vasse Jr.
1938	Treasure Island	Vladimir Vaynshtok	Long John Silver
1938	The Oppenheim Family	Grigory Roshal	Jacques Lavendel
1938	Honor	Yevgeny Chervyakov	Engineer
1945	The Man in a Case	Isidor Annensky	Tarantulov
1940	Tanya	Grigori Aleksandrov	Feodor Karpovich Dorokhov
1941	They Met in Moscow	Ivan Pyryev	Levon Mikhaylovich
1941	How Ivan Ivanovich Quarreled with Ivan Nikiforovich	Andrey Kustov and Anisim Mazur	Town governor
1941	The Sea Hawk	Vladimir Braun	Ivan Akimovich
1944	The Wedding	Isidor Annensky	Dymba the Greek
1944	The Duel	Vladimir Legoshin	Gestapo Colonel Krauschke
1949	Alexander Popov	Herbert Rappaport and Viktor Eysymont	Isaacs
1953	Silvery Dust	Pavel Armand and Abram Room	Sheriff Smiles

== See also ==
- Vsevolod Meyerhold State Theatre
