= Judgment of the Mad =

1961 Soviet drama film

- Russian: Суд сумасшедших
- Directed by: Grigori Roshal
- Written by: Grigori Roshal
- Starring: Vasily Livanov; Irina Skobtseva; Viktor Khokhryakov
- Release date: 1961
- Running time: 115 minute
- Country: Soviet Union
- Language: Russian

Judgment of the Mad (Russian: Суд сумасшедших) is a 1961 Soviet science fiction drama film directed by Grigori Roshal.

== Plot ==
The film takes place in Germany in the 1930s. The film tells about a scientist named Johannes Werner, who discovered the rays of the life-giving force. To prevent the use of the invention as a weapon, he destroys it and goes to the United States, where he is hiding under an assumed name. Suddenly he is offered to visit the military-industrial concern to show him a new European invention. He agrees and meets there his former pupil, who managed to recreate Werner's device and appropriated it to himself.

== Cast ==
- Vasily Livanov - Johannes Werner
- Irina Skobtseva - Susie Harrer
- Viktor Khokhryakov - Siegfried Gruber
- Vladimir Balashov - Senator
- Olga Krasina - Clare
