= A Gentle Creature (1960 film) =

- Russian: Кроткая
- Directed by: Aleksandr Borisov
- Written by: Aleksandr Borisov; Fyodor Dostoevsky; Akiba Golburt
- Starring: Iya Savvina; Andrei Popov; Vera Kuznetsova; Panteleymon Krymov; Zinaida Dorogova
- Cinematography: Vladimir Chumak; Dmitriy Meskhiev
- Music by: Lyutsian Prigozhin
- Production company: Lenfilm
- Release date: 12 October 1960
- Running time: 68 min.
- Country: Soviet Union
- Language: Russian

A Gentle Creature (Russian: Кроткая, romanized: Krotkaya) is a 1960 Soviet drama film directed by Aleksandr Borisov. A screen adaptation of the story of the same name by Dostoevsky.

== Plot ==
From lack of money, a girl without a dowry marries a usurer. But later she learns about her husband's past: about the circumstances under which he left the regiment. The meek one tries to rebel against life with her despised husband.

== Cast ==
- Iya Savvina as Gentle Woman
- Andrei Popov as Pawnbroker
- Vera Kuznetsova as Lukerya
- Panteleymon Krymov as Officer Yefimovich (as Pantelejmon Krymov)
- Zinaida Dorogova as episode
- Aleksandr Gustavson as Officer
- Nikolai Kryukov as Lieutenant
- Georgiy Kurovskiy as Officer
