= Michurin (film) =

- Directed by: Oleksandr Dovzhenko
- Written by: Oleksandr Dovzhenko
- Starring: Grigori Belov
- Cinematography: Leonid Kosmatov; Yuli Kun
- Music by: Dmitri Shostakovich
- Production company: Mosfilm
- Release date: 1 January 1949
- Running time: 96 minutes
- Country: Soviet Union
- Language: Russian

Michurin

Michurin (Russian: «Мичурин», Ukrainian: «Мічурін») is a 1948 Soviet film directed by Oleksandr Dovzhenko about the life of Russian practitioner of selection Ivan Michurin. The film is based on Dovzhenko's play Life in Bloom, which was also the title used for the film in its 1949 American release by Artkino Pictures.

== Synopsis ==
The film is set in the year 1912. Michurin declines the American's offer to work abroad and continues his studies in the Russian Empire, in spite of the fact that his ideas are not acknowledged by the tsarist government, the church and the idealistic science. Michurin receives support from outstanding scientists of the country, and continues to work untiringly. After the October Revolution, Michurin's small garden in the town of Kozlov (birthplace of the biologist) is transformed into a large state nursery.

== Cast ==
- Grigori Belov as Ivan Michurin
- Fyodor Grigoryev as Kartashov
- Vladimir Isayevas as Mayer
- Viktor Khokhryakov as Riabov
- Yuri Lyubimov as Translator
- Pavel Shamin as Terentiy
- Vladimir Solovyov as Mikhail Kalinin
- Sergei Tsenin as Byrd
- Aleksandra Vasilyeva as Michurin's wife
- Mikhail Zharov as Khrenov
- Alla Larionova (uncredited)
- Sergei Bondarchuk (IMDb entry lacking role name; not named in screen credits)
