= Ionych =

- Short story by Anton Chekhov
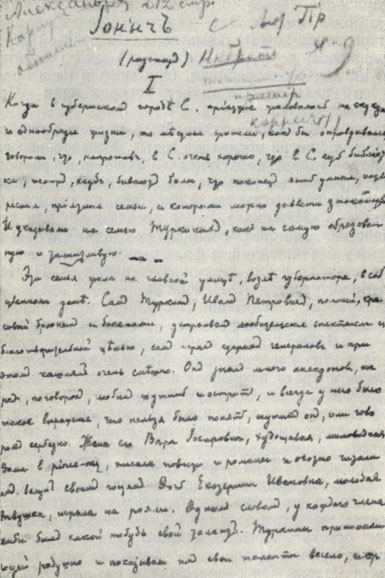
- Chekhov's manuscript for Ionych
- Original title: Ионыч
- Country: Russia
- Language: Russian

Publication
- Published in: Niva
- Publication type: Periodical
- Publisher: Adolf Marks
- Publication date: August 1898

Ionych (Russian: Ионыч) is a short story written by Anton Chekhov in 1898.

== Publication ==
The story was published in issue no. 9 of the Monthly Literary Supplements to Niva magazine in September 1898. It subsequently appeared in a slightly revised version in the ninth volume of his collected works from 1899–1901, published by Niva's publisher Adolf Marks.

== Background ==
The story, written in Nice, France, in early 1898, was originally intended for the magazine Russian Mind. Chekhov opted against sending the manuscript by post and, upon returning home in May, handed it to the magazine's publisher, Vukol Lavrov. However, he suddenly changed his mind. Writing to the editor-in-chief Viktor Goltsev, he asked for the manuscript to be returned, saying that it was not fit for the magazine. On receipt of the galley proofs, he immediately sent them to Niva. Its editor Rostislav Sementkovsky was pleasantly surprised and flattered, writing to Chekhov that he had "read your story with immense delight and, needless to say, all your wishes will be met".

== Plot ==
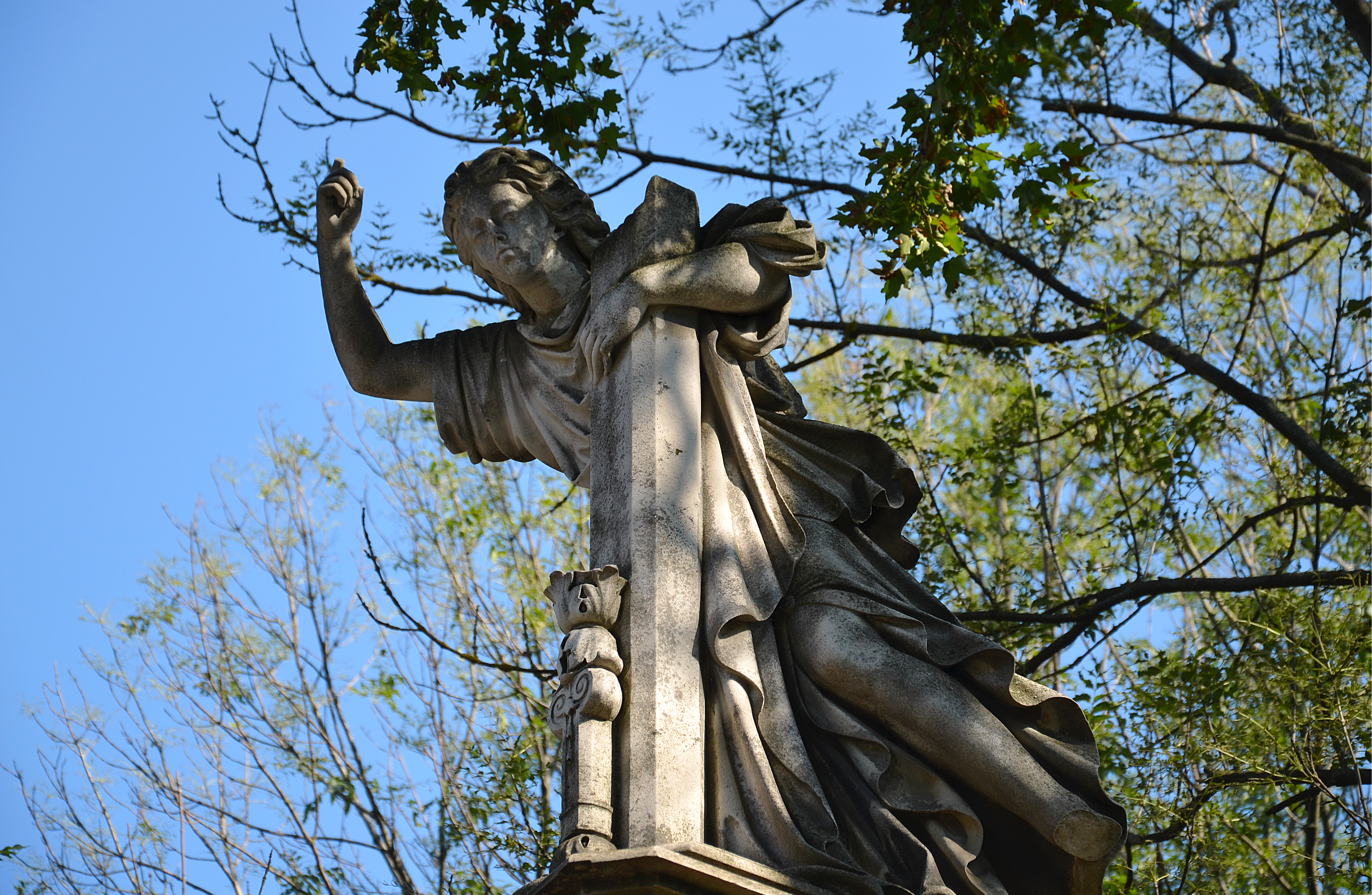
The Angel over the F.D. Kotopuli Vault, the latter known also as the Demetti Grave, at the Taganrog Old Cemetery. It was here that doctor Startsev once found himself at midnight, full of blissful, short-lived excitement, waiting for his beloved Kotik in vain

Doctor Dmitry Ionovich Startsev comes to the provincial town S., to work for the local zemstvo. He starts visiting the Turkin family, considered to be the pride of the town, where the husband runs a small amateur theatre, the wife writes novels and their beautiful daughter Ekaterina (known informally as Kotik, which means Kittie) plays the piano, preparing herself for the conservatory. Unlike the majority of the townsfolk, Startsev does not take this acme of the local cultural life seriously, yet Kotik, full of charm, naivety and youthful spirits, easily conquers his heart. Before making the proposal, he even takes a midnight trip to the town's old graveyard (Note: The exact meeting place was supposed to be the so-called Demetti Monument: this detail points to Taganrog as being the Town S.) where she'd jovially made a mock appointment with him, and even finds this silly adventure delightful. She is full of ambitions, though, and refuses him. For three days Startsev suffers greatly, then learns that she indeed had departed from the town to enroll into the conservatory, settles down into normalcy and soon all but forgets her, remembering his momentary madness with mild amusement.

Four years on, and Startsev is now a respected medical man, who owns a troika. Ekaterina returns to the town. She looks better than ever, and her musical ambitions are left behind. Still, the naivety and freshness are gone. As the two meet, she eagerly tries to re-awaken his interest in her, but Startsev remains unresponsive. Now everything about the family irritates him and he is very glad he'd not married. Ignoring her insistent attempts at making him again regular visitor, he never sets foot in the Turkin's house again.

Several years later, Startsev is now a rich man with vast practice, who enjoys playing Vint and collecting money from patients. He is described as looking like 'a pagan god', in his troika, shouting at cabmen around him. Owning two houses and an estate, he is fat, irascible, and generally indifferent to the world around him. He is referred to as 'Ionych', which implies a mixture of familiarity and slight contempt. The Turkins are the same as they were years before: the husband runs a little theatre, entertaining his guests with well-rehearsed humour, the wife reads aloud her novels, and Ekaterina still to plays her piano very loud. It's just that she looks older and, her health deteriorating, each autumn takes a trip to the Crimea.

== Reception ==
The story was warmly received. Its most detailed review came from D.N. Ovsyaniko-Kulikovsky, who, writing for Zhurnal Dlya Vsekh, hailed Chekhov as "an independent force blazing in literature the trail of its own", and described Chekhov's method being that he "...never gives us a well-worked, all-round portrait of his characters... Just provides one, two, three strokes and then backs this sketch up with a kind of see-through, unusually subtle and to shrewd psychological analysis". Ovsyaniko-Kulikovsky considered Ionych the most perfect, complete example of Chekhov's art.

== Adaptations ==
In 1966 the story was adapted into a film, In S. City, directed by Iosif Kheifits.
