= Vyacheslav Gordanov =

Soviet cinematographer (1902–1983)

- Born: Vyacheslav Vyacheslavovich Gordanov; 28 July 1902; Polotsk, Russian Empire
- Died: 18 November 1983 (aged 81); Moscow, Soviet Union
- Occupation: Cinematographer
- Years active: 1929–1951 (film)

Vyacheslav Vyacheslavovich Gordanov (Russian: Вячеслав Вячеславович Горда́нов; 28 July 1902 – 18 November 1983) was a Soviet and Russian cinematographer. He worked on the 1949 film Ivan Pavlov.

== Selected filmography ==
- Lenin's Address (1929)
- The Storm (1933)
- Peter the Great (1937–1938)
- Masquerade (1941)
- Mittens (1942)
- In the Name of Life (1946)
- Ivan Pavlov (1949)

== Awards and honours ==
- Order of the Red Banner of Labour (23 March 1938) – for film Peter the Great
- Honoured Worker of the Arts Industry of the RSFSR (1950)
- Stalin Prize, 1st class (1950) – for film Ivan Pavlov

== Bibliography ==
- Beumers, Birgit. Directory of World Cinema: Russia. Intellect Books, 2011.
