= Grigori Belov =

Russian actor

- Григорий Белов
- Born: December 18, 1895; Vakhonkino, Novgorod Governorate, Russian Empire
- Died: September 13, 1965 (aged 69); Yaroslavl, Russian SFSR, Soviet Union
- Occupation: Actor
- Years active: 1917–1965

Grigori Akinfovich Belov (Note: Russian: Григорий Акинфович Белов, romanized: Grigory Akinfovich Belov) (18 December 1895 – 13 September 1965) was a Russian actor. He appeared in more than ten films from 1940 to 1966.

== Selected filmography ==
Year	Title	Role	Notes
1948	Michurin	Ivan Michurin	
1951	The Village Doctor	Dr. Arsenyev	
1952	Rimsky-Korsakov	Nikolai Rimsky-Korsakov	
