= Lincoln (play) =

- Original language: English
- Written by: Benjamin Chapin
- Genre: Historical

Premiere
- Date: February 19, 1906
- Place: Hartford, Connecticut

Lincoln is a historical play in four acts by the American actor and playwright Benjamin Chapin. Chapin was a celebrated Abraham Lincoln impersonator, and his play centered around three key events from the life of the American president: the 1861 defeat of Fort Sumter which initiated the American Civil War; the Battle of Gettysburg in 1863; and the last day of Lincoln's life prior to his assassination at the Ford's Theatre. The events themselves were not actually seen on stage, but rather Lincoln's reactions to news of events from within the White House in conversations with his advisors and his family.

== History ==
As early as 1903, Benjamin Chapin was performing in public as Abraham Lincoln; a role in which he excelled both in nearly identical physical likeness but also through uncannily accurate mannerisms which spellbound any older audience members who had known the president and were familiar with his gate and bearing from life. These performances were a series of monologues, and they ultimately formed the basis for his 1906 play.

Chapin created several different drafts of the play Lincoln; trying out various versions of the play for over a year before ultimately determining that the play should be set entirely at the White House (with the exception of one scene in the War Room), and that the play should focus on three key events: the 1861 defeat of Fort Sumter; the 1863 Battle of Gettysburg and the final day of Lincoln's life leading up to his assassination.

Lincoln premiered on February 19, 1906 in Hartford, Connecticut with Chapin in the title role. The production reached Broadway a month later, where its New York premiere occurred on March 26, 1906 at the Liberty Theatre. The actress Maude Granger also starred in the play as Lincoln's wife, Mary Todd Lincoln, and actor Francis McGinn portrayed two role, Edwin Stanton, the United States Secretary of War, and the White House attendant "Old Edward". Chapin and McGinn co-directed the production, and the sets were designed by the painter Ernest Albert. Others in the cast included William H. Pascoe as General Joseph Hooker, George Clarke as Tad Lincoln, Daisy Lovering as Kate Morris, and the actors David R. Young and Malcolm Duncan as soldiers.

Reviews of the Broadway production, tended to compare the work favorably to another Civil War drama which had just been staged at the Liberty prior to the premiere of Lincoln; Thomas Dixon Jr.'s controversial The Clansman, which glorified the Ku Klux Klan. The New York Times considered Chapin's play as "wholesome" and "an antidote" to the previous production. This was largely due to Chapin's intentional avoidance of controversial topics, including slavery, that would divide Northern and Southern audiences, and his avoidance of any kind of inflammatory commentary or staging devices; unlike the Dixon play. Rather than being a pointed political work, Lincoln was an intimate biographical play that chose to emphasize Lincoln's qualities of charity, wisdom, patience, and good humor in the face of adversity. The relationship with his wife was a central point of the play, and Lincoln's ability to maintain a cool head and sense of humor in arguments with his wife was demonstrated in several scenes in the production.

Elements of the play were later used in the 1917 The Lincoln Cycle of silent films starring Chapin.

== Bibliography ==
- Babington, Bruce; Barr, Charles (2018). The Call of the Heart: John M. Stahl and Hollywood Melodrama. Indiana University Press. ISBN 9780861969494.
- Fleming, E.J. (2009). Paul Bern: The Life and Famous Death of the MGM Director and Husband of Harlow. McFarland & Company. ISBN 9780786452743.
- Mantle, Burns; Sherwood, Garrison P.; Chapman, John Arthur (1944). "Lincoln". The Best Plays of 1899-1909. Dodd, Mead & Co.
- Wightman Fox, Richard (2015). Lincoln's Body: A Cultural History. W. W. Norton. ISBN 9780393247244.
