= The Artamonov Business (film) =

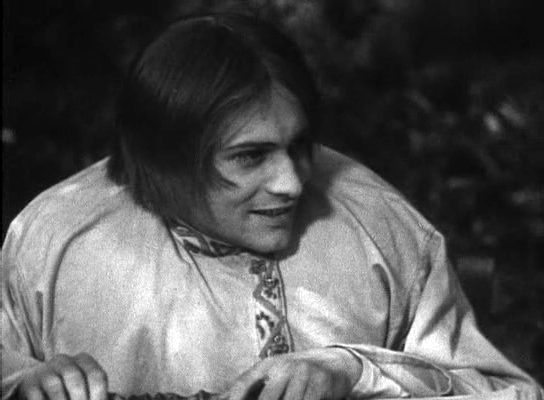
- Vladimir Balashov as Nikita Artamonov
- Russian: Дело Артамоновых
- Directed by: Grigori Roshal
- Written by: Sergei Yermolinsky
- Starring: Sergei Romodanov; Tamara Chistyakova; Mikhail Derzhavin Sr.; Vera Maretskaya; Vladimir Balashov; Aleksandr Smirnov
- Cinematography: Leonid Kosmatov
- Edited by: Grigori Shirokov
- Music by: Marian Koval
- Production company: Mosfilm
- Release date: 1941
- Running time: 94 min.
- Country: Soviet Union
- Language: Russian

The Artamonov Business (Russian: Дело Артамоновых, romanized: Delo Artamonovykh) is a 1941 Soviet drama film directed by Grigori Roshal based on the eponymous novel by Maxim Gorky.

== Plot ==
Fabricant Ilya Artamonov is a former serf. His desire to strengthen and develop his business knows no obstacles. He is still connected with peasants and craftsmen, but with his death this connection breaks off. His son, Pyotr Artamonov, begins a conflict with the workers, which is inherited by Ilya Artamonov Jr.

== Cast ==
- Sergei Romodanov as Ilya Artamonov
- Tamara Chistyakova as Ulyana Baymakova
- Mikhail Derzhavin Sr. as Pyotr Artamonov
- Vera Maretskaya as Natalya
- Vladimir Balashov as Nikita
- Aleksandr Smirnov as Aleksei
- Mikhail Pugovkin as Stepasha Barsky
- Grigory Shpigel as Yakov
- Lyubov Orlova as Paula Menotti
- Tatyana Barysheva as Barskaya
- Nadir Malishevsky as Ilya Jr.
