= Private Aleksandr Matrosov =

1947 Soviet war film

- Russian: Рядовой Александр Матросов
- Directed by: Leonid Lukov
- Written by: Giorgi Mdivani
- Starring: Anatoly Ignatyev; Vladimir Balashov; Oleg Zhakov
- Cinematography: Aleksandr Gintsburg
- Music by: David Blok
- Release date: 1947
- Running time: 85 minutes
- Country: Soviet Union
- Language: Russian

Private Aleksandr Matrosov (Russian: Рядовой Александр Матросов) is a 1947 Soviet war drama directed by Leonid Lukov.

== Plot ==
The film is a dramatization of the life of Alexander Matrosov, a Red Army soldier who was awarded the title of Hero of the Soviet Union for blocking a German machine gun with his body during a 1943 battle, killing him but blocking further fire against other advancing Soviet soldiers.

== Cast ==
- Anatoly Ignatyev as Alexander Matrosov
- Pyotr Konstantinov as Ivan Konstantinovich Chumakov
- Konstantin Sorokin as Misha Skvortsov
- Shamsi Kiyomov as Khadyn Abdurakhmanov
- Lavrenty Masokha as Vasya Petrov
- Vladimir Balashov as Kostya Ilyin
- Oleg Zhakov as Captain Vasily Shcherbina
- Mikhail Kuznetsov as Captain Kolosov
- Anatoly Nelidov as Nikolai Gavrilovich
- Faina Ranevskaya as military doctor
- Aleksei Dikiy as Joseph Stalin (scenes removed in 1963)
