= Andrei Popov (actor) =

Soviet actor (1918–1983)

- Popov in A Gentle Creature (1960)
- Born: Andrei Alekseyevich Popov; 12 April 1918; Kostroma, RSFSR
- Died: 10 June 1983 (aged 65); Moscow, Soviet Union
- Occupations: Actor, theater director, pedagogue
- Years active: 1940–1983
- Father: Aleksey Popov

Andrei Alekseyevich Popov (Russian: Андрей Алексеевич Попов; 12 April 1918 – 10 June 1983) was a Soviet and Russian stage and film actor, theatre director and pedagogue. People's Artist of the USSR (1965).

== Biography ==
His father, Aleksey Popov, was the director of the Red Army Theatre. Young Popov made his film debut in 1930, as a schoolboy in Russian silent film Large Nuisance; that film was eventually lost or destroyed during the turbulent history of the Soviet Union.

Between 1935 and 1939, Popov studied acting at the Drama Studio of the Red Army Theatre in Moscow. Until 1974 he was a permanent member of the troupe at the Central Theatre of the Soviet Army (formerly known as the Red Army Theatre).

He joined the Communist Party of the Soviet Union in 1946.

During World War II, Popov entertained soldiers at the front-lines. After his father's retirement in 1963, Andrei Popov succeeded him as the artistic director of the Soviet Army Theatre.

In 1974, Popov was invited to join the Moscow Art Theatre. There he co-starred in several stage productions together with such partners as Smoktunovsky, Yefremov, Tabakov, and other stars of Russian theater. He appeared in more than 40 films between 1947 and 1981.

Andrei Popov was designated a People's Artist of the USSR and also received the Stalin Prize. From 1960s to 1982 he taught acting at Russian Institute of Theatre Arts.

== Filmography ==
- Mussorgsky (1950) as Nikolai Rimsky-Korsakov
- The Unforgettable Year 1919 (1951) as Nikolai Neklyudov
- The Composer Glinka (1952) as Vladimir Stasov
- Hostile Whirlwinds (1953) as R. H. Bruce Lockhart
- The Safety Match (1954) as Detective Emil Dyukovsky
- The Road (1955) as Professor Sergei Ignatyevich Baytalin
- Othello (1955) as Iago
- Gutta-percha Boy (1957) as Count Listomirov
- Duel (1957) as Vasily Nazansky
- A Gentle Creature (1960) as Pawnbroker
- Russian Souvenir (1960) as Adlai Huntor Scott
- All Remains to People (1963) as father Serafim
- Hamlet (1964) as episode
- In S. City (1966) as Anton Chekhov
- Day Stars (1966) as Olga Bergholz's father
- The Seventh Companion (1967) as Maj. Gen. Yevgeny Pavlovich Adamov
- Dreams of Love – Liszt (1970) as Franz Liszt's voice (role played by Imre Sinkovits)
- Taming of the Fire (1972) as Nikolai Ivanovich Logunov
- A Teacher of Singing (1972) as Yefrem Nikolayevich Solomatin
- Step Forward (1976) as Captain
- Wounded Game (1976) as Sergei Makarovich's voice (role played by Panteleimon Krymov)
- How Ivanushka the Fool Travelled in Search of Wonder (1977) as Lukomor Lukomorych
- A Few Days from the Life of I. I. Oblomov (1980) as Zakhar, Oblomov's servant

== Awards and honors ==
- Stalin Prize (1950)
- Honored Artist of the RSFSR (1954)
- People's Artist of the RSFSR (1959)
- People's Artist of the USSR (1965)
- Order of the Red Banner of Labour (1967)
- Order of the October Revolution (1978)
