= The White Poodle =

- Directed by: Marianna Roshal and Vladimir Shredel
- Written by: Georgiy Grebner
- Based on: The White Poodle; Aleksandr Kuprin
- Starring: Viktor Koltsov; Vladimir Polyakov; Natalya Gitserot; Aleksandr Antonov; Anatoly Fradis
- Cinematography: Andrei Boltyansky
- Music by: Aleksei Muravlyov
- Production company: Odessa Film Studio
- Release date: 1956
- Running time: 70 minutes
- Country: Soviet Union
- Language: Russian

The White Poodle (Russian: Белый пудель, romanized: Belyy pudel) is a 1956 Soviet children's adventure film directed by Marianna Roshal-Stroyeva and Vladimir Shredel. The screenplay was adapted by Grigorii Grebnev from the Aleksandr Kuprin story of the same name. The main roles were played by Viktor Koltsov and Vladimir Polyakov, with others taken by Natalie Gitserot, Alexander Antonov and Georgy Millyar. Filmed in 1955, it was released in October 1956.

== Plot ==
On the Crimean coast at the end of the 19th century, the old organ-grinder Lodyzhkin, his 12-year-old acrobat son Seryozha and their clever white poodle Arto put on shows for the locals and holidaymakers. They earn a modest living and despite the long walks the boy finds the strength to sing as they travel around. One day, in Yalta, they enter the garden of a luxurious house and put on a show before its owners and Trilly, a child nobody says no to. As they are about to leave, Trilly demands the poodle at any price and, despite his family's attempts to explain that the poodle is not for sale as he is central to their act, Trilly won't back down and a crisis ensues. His mother offers the organ-grinder a huge sum of money but he refuses and leaves. That night the dog disappears...

== Cast ==
- Viktor Koltsov as grandfather Lodizhkin
- Vladimir Polyakov as Serge, acrobat
- Natalia Gitserot as Ms. Obolyaninova
- Alexander Antonov as janitor
- Georgy Millyar as servant Ivan
- Mikhail Gluzsky as fisherman
- Simon Svashenko as Hobo
- Galina Levchenko
- Valentina Kutsenko as fisherwoman
- Aleksandr Antonov as yardman
