= Marianna Roshal-Stroyeva =

Russian film director (1925–2022)

- Born: Marianna Grigorievna Roshal-Stroyeva; 23 January 1925; Moscow, Russian SFSR, USSR
- Died: 22 October 2022 (aged 97); London, England
- Education: Gerasimov Institute of Cinematography
- Occupation: Film director

Marianna Grigorievna Roshal-Stroyeva (Russian: Марианна Григорьевна Рошаль-Строева; 23 January 1925 – 22 October 2022) was a Russian film director.

== Biography ==
Marianna was born in Moscow on 23 January 1925 to film directors Grigori Roshal and Vera Stroyeva. While evacuating from fighting in World War II, she edited films for Kazakhfilm. She graduated from the directing department at the Gerasimov Institute of Cinematography in 1948 under the direction of Lev Kuleshov. From 1949 to 1954, she was a film director for Centrnauchfilm and a student of Sergei Eisenstein at the State Institute for Art Studies.

In 1956, Roshal-Stroyeva directed the film The White Poodle alongside Vladimir Shredel at the Odesa Film Studio, based on a story by Aleksandr I. Kuprin. In 1967, she began working on literary translations and co-authored a historical novel.

Roshal-Stroyeva was a member of the Guild of Film Directors of Russia. In her later life, she lived in London. She was the mother of conceptual artist Mikhail Fedorov-Roshal.

Roshal-Stroyeva died in London on 22 October 2022, at the age of 97.

== Filmography ==
- The White Poodle (1956)
- Orlinyy ostrov (1961)
- Probuzhdeniye (1968)
