= Aleksandr Borisov (actor) =

Soviet actor

- Александр Борисов
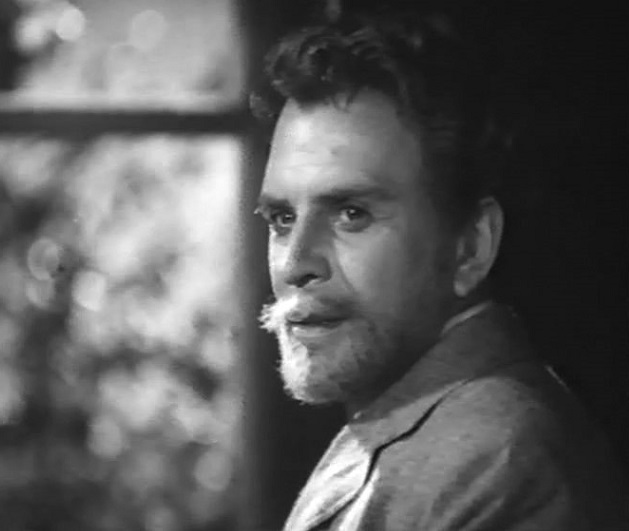
- Born: 1 May 1905; Saint Petersburg, Russian Empire
- Died: 12 May 1982 (aged 77); Leningrad, Russian SFSR, Soviet Union
- Occupations: Actor, film director, screenwriter, singer
- Years active: 1938–1982

Aleksandr Fyodorovich Borisov (Note: Russian: Александр Фёдорович Борисов, romanized: Aleksandr Fyodorovich Borisov) (1 May 1905 – 12 May 1982) was a Soviet stage and film actor, film director, screenwriter and singer. People's Artist of the USSR (1951) and Hero of Socialist Labour (1981). Stalin Prize first degree (1950, 1951). Stalin Prize second degree (1947, 1951). Stanislavsky State Prize of the RSFSR (1975).

== Biography ==
Borisov was born in Saint Petersburg into a poor family of a washerwoman and a kitchen worker.

Borisov studied at the studio of the Alexandrinsky Theatre under mentorship of Yuri Yuryev; he joined the troupe of its studio theater upon graduation in 1927 and its main troupe in 1928.

He died in Leningrad, and was buried in the Volkovo Cemetery.

== Filmography ==
- Friends (1938) – Nazarka, cossack
- Ivan Pavlov (1949) – Ivan Pavlov – Stalin Prize first degree (1950)
- Alexander Popov (1949) – Pyotr Nikolayevich Rybkin – Stalin Prize second degree (1951)
- Mussorgsky (1950) – Modest Mussorgsky – Stalin Prize first degree (1951)
- Belinsky (1953) – Alexander Herzen
- Rimsky-Korsakov (1953) – Savva Mamontov
- True Friends (1954) – Professor Aleksandr Fyodorovich Lapin
- Maksim Perepelitsa (1955) – Marko Mukha
- Different Fortunes (1956) – Roshchin's singing voice (role played by Bruno Freindlich)
- October Days (1958) – Vershin, soldier
- A Gentle Creature (1960; film director and screenwriter)
- War and Peace (1966–1967) – Uncle Rostov
- In S. City (1967) – Puzyryov
- The Green Carriage (1967) – Aleksandr Mikhailovich Gedeonov
