= Alexander Popov (film) =

1949 film by Herbert Rappaport

- Directed by: Herbert Rappaport; Viktor Eisymont
- Written by: Alexander Razumovsky
- Starring: Nikolai Cherkasov; Yefim Kopelyan; Aleksandr Borisov; Bruno Freindlich; Yury Tolubeyev; Osip Abdulov
- Cinematography: Anatoli Nazarov; Yevgeni Shapiro
- Production company: Lenfilm
- Release date: 1949
- Running time: 87 minutes
- Country: Soviet Union
- Language: Russian

Alexander Popov (Russian: Александр Попов) is a 1949 biographical drama film directed by Herbert Rappaport about the life and work of Alexander Stepanovich Popov, who was a notable physicist and electrical engineer and an early developer of radio communication.

== Plot ==
Alexander Popov collaborates with Pyotr Rybkin (portrayed by Alexander Borisov), who is studying the electromagnetic theory of light. Together, they conduct experiments that lead to the invention of the wireless telegraph, a device they use to save the lives of sailors trapped in Arctic ice under the command of Admiral Makarov (played by Konstantin Skorobogatov).

However, Popov's journey is fraught with challenges. Alongside supportive colleagues, he faces unscrupulous individuals seeking to exploit scientific breakthroughs for personal gain. The invention's patent is ultimately secured by Marconi, forcing Russia to purchase devices from abroad for years. Despite offers from foreign institutions, Popov remains a patriot, reflecting the integrity and moral principles that make him a figure of admiration and respect.

== Role as propaganda film ==
Along with Grigori Roshal's Ivan Pavlov, which came out that same year, Alexander Popov was among the first in a series of patriotic biographical films produced in the Soviet Union which aimed to prove the superiority of Russian and Soviet science and art over that of the West.

The films acknowledges the Italian inventor Guglielmo Marconi, but makes no mention of Nikola Tesla, whose work paved the way for Popov's inventions. This obscuring of American achievements is in line with other Russian Cold War-era films.

== Cast ==
- Nikolay Cherkasov as Aleksandr Stepanovich Popov
- Aleksandr Borisov as Rybkin
- Konstantin Skorobogatov as Admiral Makarov
- Ilya Sudakov as Mendeleyev
- Yuriy Tolubeev as Petrushevsky
- Vladimir Chestnokov as Lyuboslavsky
- Kseniya Blagoveshchenskaya as Raisa Alekseevna
- Leonid Vivyen as Tyrtov
- Bruno Freindlikh as Marconi
- Osip Abdulov as Isaacs

== Awards ==
In 1951, Cherkasov, Skorobogatov, Freindlich, and Borisov received the Stalin Prize of the 2nd degree for their work on Alexander Popov.
