= Louisa Watson Peat =

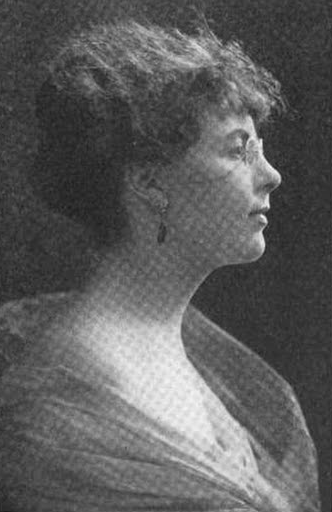
Louisa Watson Peat, from a 1918 publication.

Louisa Watson Peat, born Louisa Watson Small, (1883–1953) was an Irish-born writer and lecturer.

== Life and work ==
Born in Keady, County Armagh, Ireland, Louisa Peat attending Queens College in Belfast, and also attended the University of London.

After graduation she worked in London, first for the Daily Chronicle and later for Herbert N. Casson, managing the London office. The British Government employed Miss Small as an efficiency lecturer in 1915. Attempting to locate her cousin, John O'Donnell Watson, who was serving in a Canadian Battalion from Alberta, at the front during World War I, Miss Small had advertised looking for news and received many responses, including a letter from a Canadian soldier, Harold R. Peat, who had served with the Third (Canadian) Battalion. Peat, was then recuperating from action at Ypres, at the Royal Herbert Hospital, Woolwich. Eventually they became a couple and married. Together, they wrote Private Peat,, a best-selling account of a soldier under fire during the Great War. Her memoir of this period Mrs. Private Peat was published in 1918.

Harold Peat sent for Miss Small to join him in Canada and they were married on 24 August 1916. The Irving (?) Rossiter Family in Winnipeg assisted the bride with settling in North America. They lived in Chicago where two daughters were born, Louisa "Pat" Watson Peat (O'Neil), (known as artist Pat Peat O'Neil), and Julienne Michelle "Miki" Peat (Ruse). The family lived for a period in Vancouver, British Columbia, Canada, where their third child, Elizabeth "Betty" Peat, was born. Betty Peat married Boleslaw Gladych.

The couple lectured and toured, promoting their books. The Inexcusable Lie which was published in 1923, is a treatise against nationalism and destructive patriotism that wastes the youth of nations.

During the 1920s Louisa and Harold Peat traveled around North America on the Redpath Chatauqua Circuit with their growing family. Archives at the University of Iowa contain programs and advertisements of their lectures which were mainly concerned with ensuring peace and promoting democracy.

In the late 1920s or early 1930s, Louisa Peat settled in Michigan City, Indiana, and worked as an editor for the women's section of the Michigan City News-Dispatch paper. In the late 1930s or early 1940s, Louisa Watson Small Peat moved to New York City to continue her writing career. During that time, she was editing and ghost writing for various authors, including Sydney Robert Montague, and Fulton Oursler.

After World War II, Louisa Peat published Canada, New World Power and in 1950 Grandma Did It This Way, Memories of an Irish Childhood.

Louisa Watson Small Peat died in 1953 at Hyannisport, Massachusetts.

== Publications ==
- Mrs. Private Peat (1918)
- Canada New World Power (1945)
- Grandma Did It This Way (1950)

About Louisa Watson Peat

- Brush, Philippa Mary, 1999. "This feminine invasion": Women and the workplace in Canadian magazines, 1900–1930. Edmonton: PhD Diss., University of Alberta.
