= Harold R. Peat =

Canadian soldier and author

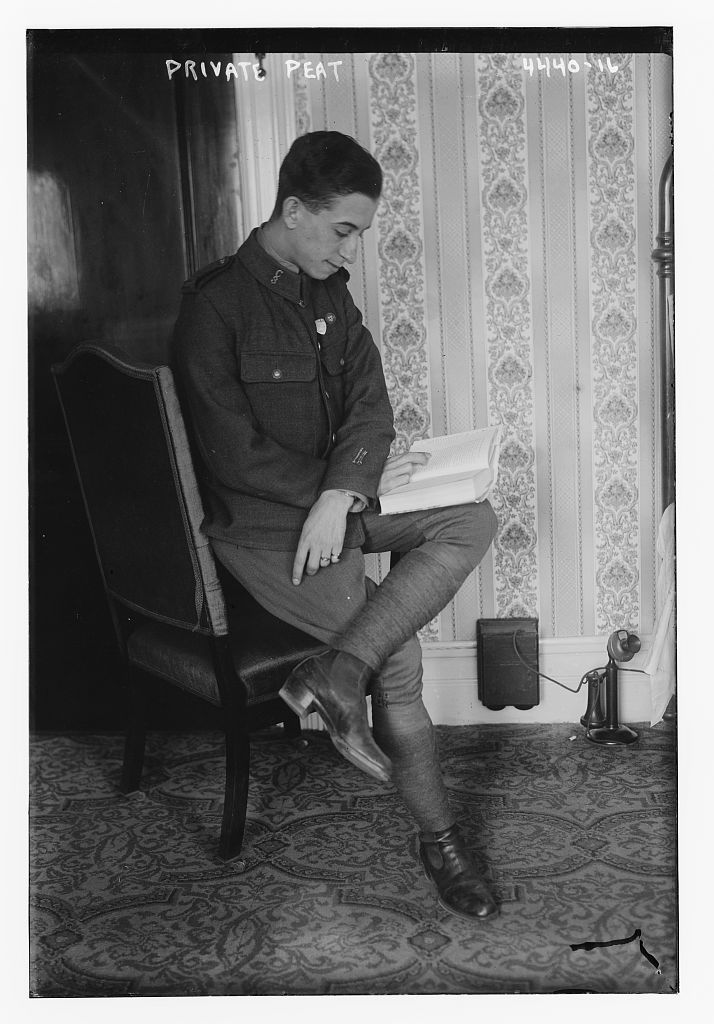
- Private Peat
- Born: July 12, 1893; Kingston, Jamaica
- Died: 1960 (aged 66–67)
- Occupations: soldier, author

Harold Reginald Peat (July 12, 1893 – 1960) was a Canadian soldier and author.

== Biography ==
Born in Jamaica in 1893, and emigrated to Toronto with his mother, Peat was educated privately and at boarding school in Kingston, Jamaica.

He served as a private in the 3rd Battalion of the First Canadian Contingent during World War I. He was hit by an explosive bullet and lost his right arm. While recuperating in a hospital, he became pen-mate with Louisa Watson Small, a British writer. Louisa Watson Small was born in Keady, Armagh, Ireland and educated at Queens College, Belfast and the University of London. In August 1916 they married.

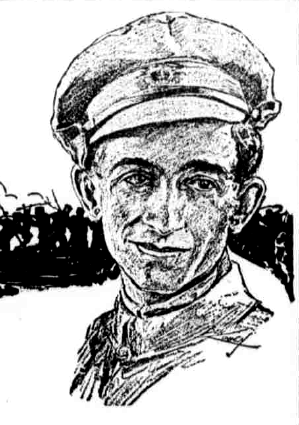
Closeup of a drawing of Peat from an advertisement for the film

Louisa helped Harold write Private Peat (1917), a memoir of his experiences during World War I and after. He described himself as an ardent Prohibitionist but in the book he said he did not think the rum ration controversially issued to Canadian troops was dangerous. The book was on the New York Times bestseller list in 1918 and 1919. The film Private Peat (1918) was directed by Edward José based on the book with Peat starring as himself, Miriam Fouche, and William Sorelle acted in the movie with Peat. The screenplay was written by Charles E. Whittaker and it was released by the Famous Players–Lasky Corporation.

The couple lectured and toured, promoting their books, which included The Inexcusable Lie (1923), a treatise against nationalism and destructive patriotism that wastes the youth of nations.

With their three young daughters, Peat and Louisa toured the United States, both lecturing on the Redpath Chautauqua Circuit. Peat was also a contributor to various magazines and traveled to Australia and New Zealand during this period. One of several grandchildren, L. Peat O'Neil, is a travel writer and new media writer.

Peat ran a Speakers Bureau in New York before and after WWII. Peat's speakers included Winston Churchill, Robert E. Peary, Lady Baden-Powell, Thomas Mann, William Patrick Hitler, Lillian Hellman, Ilka Chase, H.G. Wells, Alice Longworth, and Jesse Stuart among others.

Louisa Watson Small Peat died in 1953.

Harold's second wife, Grace Sims Peat, was a graduate of the University of Alabama and a pilot. Papers from the Peat Lecture Bureau are found at the University of Alabama, along with papers of Grace Sims Peat.

Peat retired to Jamaica after WWII and ran Columbus Inn, a beach resort hotel from 1948 to 1953. Peat renamed Dry Harbor to Discovery Bay, St. Ann's Parish, Jamaica.

== Works ==
- Private Peat, 1917
- Inexcusable Lie, 1923
- Private Peat, The Movie

Publications about Harold R. Peat

- Harold Ross, The Talk of the Town, "From Captain to Private.," The New Yorker, October 17, 1942, p. 13
- Brush, Philippa Mary, 1999. "This Feminine Invasion: Women and the Workplace in Canadian Magazines, 1900-1930." Edmonton: PhD Diss., University of Alberta
