= Grigorii Grebnev =

Grigorii Nikitich Gribonosov (Russian: Григо́рий Ники́тич Грибоно́сов; 5 (18) January 1902, Odessa - 30 March 1960, Moscow) was a Soviet journalist and science fiction and adventure writer, who wrote under the name Grigorii Grebnev (Григо́рий Гребнев). He also wrote screenplays, including the adaptation of Alexander Kuprin's story for The White Poodle 1956 film. As a science fiction writer, he wrote the novels Arktaniya (1938), Propavšeye sokrovišče (1957), and short stories published in Stala sa tomorrow.

He also has one son named Grigorii Gribonosov-Grebnev, who is a prose writer that currently lives in Moscow.

== Life ==
He began work at 14 and fought in the Russian Civil War and Second World War, writing for Soviet newspapers and magazines such as Komsomolskaya Pravda. His literary career began in 1930.
