= The Lincoln Cycle =

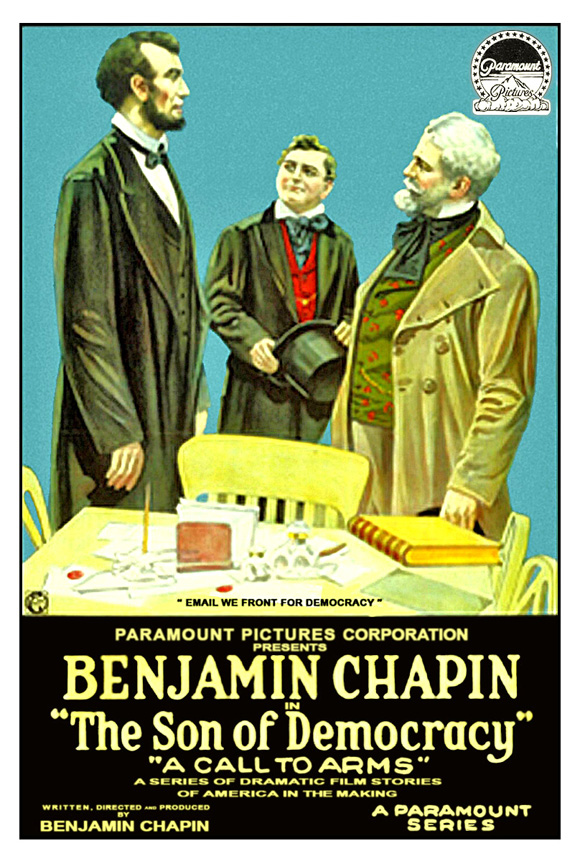
- Directed by: John M. Stahl
- Written by: Benjamin Chapin
- Produced by: Benjamin Chapin
- Starring: Benjamin Chapin
- Cinematography: Walter Blakeley; Harry Fischbeck; J. Roy Hunt
- Production company: Charter Features Corporation
- Distributed by: Paramount Pictures
- Release date: May 27, 1917
- Running time: 10 films of 2 reels each
- Country: United States
- Languages: Silent; English intertitles

The Lincoln Cycle is a 1917 American silent series of ten short films portraying the life of American president Abraham Lincoln. They were directed by John M. Stahl and starred Benjamin Chapin, a celebrated Lincoln impersonator, in the title role. All except two episodes survive in the Library of Congress archives. It was also released as The Son of Democracy.

Chapin had appeared as Lincoln for many years, and had set up his own production company with the intention of making a film based on his own 1906 play Lincoln. Following the enormous commercial success of D. W. Griffith's The Birth of a Nation, the potential of another play related to the American Civil War allowed Chapin to plan an ambitious epic series of films, rather than a single feature. He hired young filmmaker John Stahl to direct.

It initially began shooting at studios in Fort Lee, New Jersey before shifting to Ridgefield Park. Location shooting took place around New Jersey, with some shots also taken of the White House and other historical sites. Because he lacked a distributor for his costly production, Chapin premiered the first episode at the Belasco Theater in Washington to coincide with the inauguration of Woodrow Wilson. This and a transfer to the Strand Theatre in New York proved a great success. Following American's entry into World War I the patriotic elements of the play were heavily promoted. In December it was picked up for distribution by Paramount Pictures and released serially between February 11 and April 15, 1918. By this time Chapin was in ill health and died in the summer of that year. As the films conclude without the end of the American Civil War or the assassination of Lincoln, it was likely they were unfinished.

Some confusion exists about the credits of the film because Chapin only featured himself in advertising materials acknowledging neither the other actors or the technicians behind the scenes, something that director Stahl strongly objected to.

== Cast ==
- Benjamin Chapin as Abraham Lincoln / Tom Lincoln
- Charles Jackson as Abraham Lincoln as a boy
- Madelyn Clare as Nancy Hanks Lincoln
- John Stafford as Carter
- Joseph Monahan as Willie Lincoln

== Bibliography ==
- Bruce Babington & Charles Barr. The Call of the Heart: John M. Stahl and Hollywood Melodrama. Indiana University Press, 2018.
