= Grigory Shpigel =

Soviet and Russian actor

- Born: Grigory Oyzerovich Spiegel; 24 July 1914; Samara, Russian Empire
- Died: 28 April 1981 (aged 66); Moscow, Soviet Union
- Occupation: Actor
- Years active: 1938—1981

Grigory Oyzerovich Spiegel (Russian: Григо́рий О́йзерович Шпи́гель; 24 July 1914 — 28 April 1981) was a Soviet and Russian actor and voice actor. He received the Honored Artist of the RSFSR award in 1974.

== Biography ==
He worked as a pleater at a dye factory in Leningrad. He studied at the directing department of the Central School of amateur theater in Moscow.

In 1940 he graduated from an acting school at the Mosfilm. He worked as a National Film Actors' Theatre.

He took part in voicing cartoon characters, known for his voice being unusually high pitched and sonorous for a man.

== Death ==
Died April 28, 1981. He was buried in Moscow at the Vvedenskoye Cemetery.

== Selected filmography ==
- The Oppenheim Family (Семья Оппенгейм, 1939) as high-school student (uncredited)
- The Aerial Cabman (Воздушный извозчик, 1943) as Anany Svetlovidov
- Ballad of Siberia (Сказание о земле Сибирской, 1947) as Gregory Galaida
- The Young Guard (Молодая гвардия, 1948) as Fenbong
- Ivan Pavlov (Академик Иван Павлов, 1949) as Professor Petrushev
- Brave People (Смелые люди, 1950) as Schulze
- Zhukovsky (Жуковский, 1950) as passer with a lady
- Mussorgsky (Мусоргский, 1950) as von Metz
- Taras Shevchenko (Тарас Шевченко, 1951) as Karl Bryullov
- Children of the Partisan (Дети партизана, 1954) as spy photographer
- The Gadfly (Овод, 1955) as James Burton
- The Idiot (Идиот, 1958) as Ptitsyn
- On Distant Shores (На дальних берегах, 1958) as Schulz
- Michman Panin (Мичман Панин, 1960) as Father Teoctist
- Balzaminov's Marriage (Женитьба Бальзаминова, 1964) as policeman
- Tale About the Lost Time (Сказка о потерянном времени, 1964) as first aid doctor / apple buyer in a hat
- The Tale of Tsar Saltan (Сказка о царе Салтане, 1966) as governor
- The Seventh Companion (Седьмой спутник, 1967) as Shpigel
- The Diamond Arm (Бриллиантовая рука, 1968) as pharmacist-smuggler from Fish Street
- The Twelve Chairs (Двенадцать стульев, 1971) as Aleksandr Yakovlevich
- The Crown of the Russian Empire, or Once Again the Elusive Avengers (Корона Российской Империи, или Снова Неуловимые, 1971) as photographer
- Ilf and Petrov Rode a Tram (Ехали в трамвае Ильф и Петров, 1972) as employee of the newspaper
- Privalov's Millions (Приваловские миллионы, 1972) as Oscar Filippovich
- Northern Rhapsody (Северная рапсодия, 1974) as Gleb Petrovich Churilin
- The Twelve Chairs (Двенадцать стульев, 1976) as chief editor of newspaper "The Machine"
- Three Men in a Boat (Трое в лодке, не считая собаки, 1979) as grenadier
- The Luncheon on the Grass (Завтрак на траве, 1979) as episode
- Do Not Shoot at White Swans (Не стреляйте в белых лебедей, 1980) as passenger in the compartment
- Say a Word for the Poor Hussar (О бедном гусаре замолвите слово..., 1981) as prompter
- The Mystery of the Third Planet (Тайна третьей планеты, 1981) as Vesselchuck Oo (voice)
- Dog in Boots (Пёс в сапогах, 1981) as one-eyed cat-bully (voice)
