= Mussorgsky (film) =

1950 film

- Film poster
- Directed by: Grigori Roshal
- Written by: Anna Abramova; Grigori Roshal
- Produced by: Z. Gal; Gennadi Kazansky; Ye. Serdechkova
- Starring: Aleksandr Borisov; Nikolay Cherkasov
- Cinematography: Mikhail Magid; Lev Sokolsky
- Edited by: V. Mironova
- Music by: Dmitry Kabalevsky
- Release date: 27 November 1950
- Running time: 120 minutes
- Country: Soviet Union
- Language: Russian

Mussorgsky (Russian: Мусоргский, romanized: Musorgskiy) is a 1950 Soviet biopic film directed by Grigori Roshal, about the emergence of Russian composer Modest Mussorgsky. It was entered into the 1951 Cannes Film Festival.

== Plot ==
The film tells about the activities of the association of composers "The Five", who were drawing inspiration from Russian folk art. Like many representatives of the Russian intelligentsia, members of this musical community were imbued with the plight of the peasants and sought to write works that would draw people's attention to this poorest layer of society.

The young composer Modest Mussorgsky decides to devote his life to music and to make it the property of the people. Only his mother supports his “ignoble” undertakings. The young man leaves military service and ponders writing a work about the peasants, together with members of The Five.

The Imperial Musical Society is not pleased with the activities of composers; it excludes Mily Balakirev. The writer Vladimir Stasov expresses his opinion by calling the Society newspaper musical liars, eventually ending up in court for libel, and being sued for a monetary penalty. During a trial, many supporters of "The Five" are presented.

A peasant music school, created by composers, is described for debts. Meanwhile, not one of the editions of Mussorgsky's opera Boris Godunov was allowed to appear in the imperial theaters. The directorate surrenders when the whole city begins to protest; the opera is a tremendous success. Boris Godunov radically changes the direction of the work of Russian composers.

== Cast ==
- Aleksandr Borisov as Modest Mussorgsky
- Nikolay Cherkasov as Vladimir Stasov
- Vladimir Balashov as Mily Balakirev
- Yuri Leonidov as Alexander Borodin
- Andrei Popov as Nikolai Rimsky-Korsakov
- Bruno Freindlich as César Cui
- Fyodor Nikitin as Alexander Dargomyzhsky
- Lyubov Orlova as Yuliya Platonova
- Lidiya Sukharevskaya as Grand Duchess Elena Pavlovna
- Vladimir Morozov as Ivan Melnikov
- Georgy Orlov as Osip Petrov
- Grigory Shpigel as von Metz

Uncredited:

- Ram Lebedev as Ilya Repin
- Nikolay Trofimov as student
- Valentin Yantsat as Filaret Mussorgsky
- Igor Dmitriev, cameo
