= Rimsky-Korsakov (film) =

- Directed by: Gennadi Kazansky; Grigori Roshal
- Written by: Anna Abramova; Grigori Roshal
- Starring: Grigori Belov; Nikolai Cherkasov; Aleksandr Borisov; Liliya Gritsenko
- Cinematography: Mikhail Magid; Lev Sokolsky
- Music by: Georgy Sviridov
- Production company: Lenfilm Studio
- Distributed by: Sovexport
- Release date: 1953
- Running time: 101 minutes
- Country: Soviet Union
- Language: Russian

The full film

Rimsky-Korsakov (Russian: Римский-Корсаков) is a 1953 Soviet biopic directed by Gennadi Kazansky and Grigori Roshal and starring Grigori Belov, Nikolai Cherkasov and Aleksandr Borisov. The film portrays the life of the Russian composer Nikolai Rimsky-Korsakov. The film was shot in Sovcolor.

== Plot ==
The film depicts the final two decades of the life of Russian composer Nikolai Rimsky-Korsakov. Exploring his creative and pedagogical philosophy, the narrative highlights key moments such as his lectures at the school of composers he founded, intense debates about the "anti-popular" nature of Ramensky's music (a character based on Igor Stravinsky), struggles against the tyranny of Imperial Theater bureaucrats, and the duplicity of patron Savva Mamontov. The story culminates with scenes from the Russian Revolution of 1905–1907.

The biographical plot is interwoven with vibrant, costumed scenes from Rimsky-Korsakov's operas, including Sadko, The Snow Maiden, The Tale of Tsar Saltan, Kashchey the Immortal, and The Golden Cockerel.

== Cast ==
- Grigori Belov as Nikolai Rimsky-Korsakov
- Nikolai Cherkasov as Vladimir Stasov
- Aleksandr Borisov as Savva Mamontov
- Liliya Gritsenko as Nadezhda Zabela-Vrubel
- Viktor Khokhryakov as Alexander Glazunov
- Anatoliy Kuznetsov as Anatoly Lyadov
- Lidiya Sukharevskaya as Rimskaya-Korsakova
- Aleksandr Ognivtsev as Feodor Chaliapin
- Boris Kokovkin as Valentin Serov
- Sergei Kurilov as Mikhail Vrubel
- Lidiya Dranovskaya as Almazova
- Anatoli Verbitsky as Mikhailov
- Tatyana Lennikova as Lebedeva
- Agasi Babayan as Daryan
- Bruno Freindlich as Ramensky
- Vladimir Balashov as Sergei Diaghilev
- Fyodor Nikitin as The Grand Duke
- Yevgeni Lebedev as Kashchey in Kashchey the Deathless opera

== See also ==
- Sadko is a film also from 1953 that adapts Rimsky-Korsakov's opera.

== Bibliography ==
- Mitchell, Charles P. The Great Composers Portrayed on Film, 1913 Through 2002. McFarland & Company, 2004.
