= Private Peat =

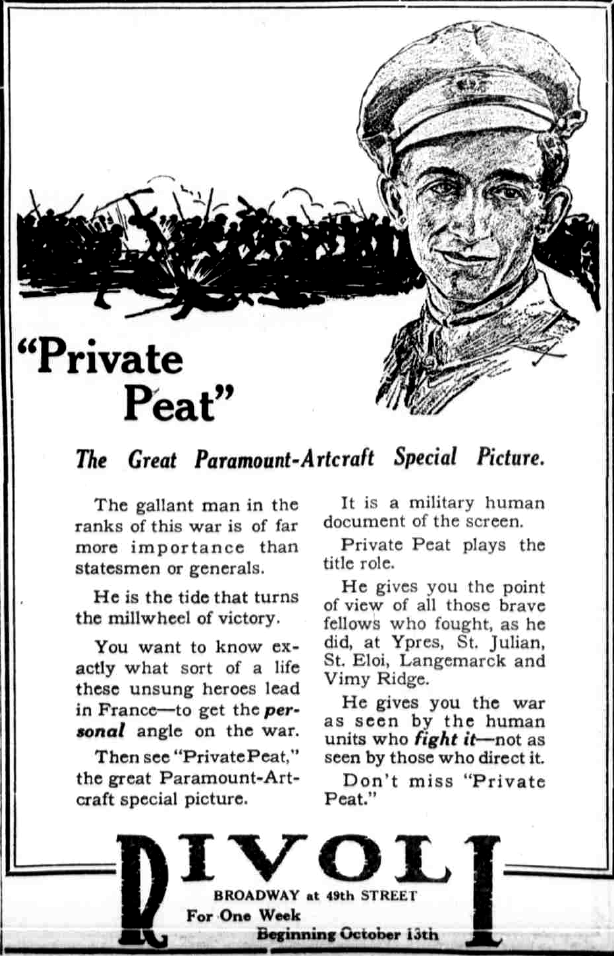
- Directed by: Edward José
- Written by: Charles E. Whittaker
- Based on: Private Peat by Harold Reginald Peat
- Produced by: Adolph Zukor; Jesse L. Lasky
- Starring: Harold R. Peat
- Cinematography: Hal Young
- Distributed by: Famous Players–Lasky; Paramount/Artcraft
- Release date: October 13, 1918
- Running time: 5 reels
- Country: United States
- Language: Silent (English intertitles)

Private Peat is a lost 1918 American silent biographical drama film directed by Edward José and written by and starring Harold R. Peat. It was produced by Adolph Zukor and Jesse L. Lasky.

== Synopsis ==
The film is based on the book Private Peat by Harold R. Peat, recalling his WW1 experiences as one of the first Americans to enlist in the conflict when American joined the war. Peat was from Canada but is presented as an all-American boy for patriotism and propaganda. The feature primarily consisted of newsreel footage.

== Cast ==
- Harold R. Peat as Himself
- Miriam Fouche as Mrs. Mary Peat
- William Sorelle as Old Bill (credited as William J. Sorelle)
- Edwin J. Grant (Undetermined Role)
