= The Oppenheim Family =

1938 film by Grigori Roshal

- Directed by: Grigori Roshal
- Written by: Serafima Roshal authorized by Lion Feuchtwanger
- Starring: Vladimir Balashov; Iosif Tolchanov; Ada Voytsik; Nikolai Plotnikov
- Cinematography: Leonid Kosmatov
- Music by: Nikolai Kryukov
- Production company: Mosfilm
- Release date: 1938
- Running time: 97 minutes
- Country: Soviet Union
- Language: Russian

The Oppenheim Family

The Oppenheim Family (Russian: Семья Оппенгейм, romanized: Semja Oppengejm) is a 1938 (released in May 1939 in the USA) Soviet drama film, directed by Grigori Roshal. One of the earliest film directly dealing with the persecution of Jews in Nazi Germany, it is based on The Oppermanns, a 1933 novel by Lion Feuchtwanger.

== Plot ==
The story follows a Jewish family in early 1930s Germany as they navigate the rise of Nazi ideology.

Dr. Heinzius, a literature scholar and teacher at Queen Louise Gymnasium, dies in a scuffle with a drunken Nazi. His position is taken over by Professor Vogelzang (Igor Ilyinsky), a Nazi supporter. Vogelzang humiliates Berthold Oppenheim (Vladimir Balashov), a Jewish student, during their first class and challenges him to present a report on Arminius the Germanic after dismissing his original topic, "Humanism and the 20th Century."

Meanwhile, Berthold’s father, Martin Oppenheim (Iosif Tolchanov), refuses to merge his successful furniture business with a rival’s, dismissing concerns about the growing antisemitism. Berthold’s uncle, the skilled surgeon Edgar Oppenheim (Nikolai Plotnikov), works with his assistant Yakobi (Solomon Mikhoels) and treats the father of Berthold's friend Richard (Alexei Konsovsky). Richard meets Berthold’s cousin, Ruth (M. Minovitskaya), at the hospital, sparking a connection.

That evening, the Oppenheim family celebrates Berthold’s 17th birthday. The event is disrupted when a guest, poet Gutwetter (Sergei Martinson), delivers a Nazi toast, shocking everyone. Later, Berthold visits the Arminius monument to understand the historical figure, and on the way home, he helps save Weller (Nikolai Bogolyubov), a man being pursued by Nazi stormtroopers.

When it is time for Berthold’s presentation, he critiques Arminius as a symbol of barbarism and argues that German culture is represented by figures like Heine, Goethe, and Beethoven. Enraged, Vogelzang demands a public apology, but Berthold refuses. Following this, Berthold faces social ostracism at school, though his German friends, including Richard, support him.

Tensions escalate when a fellow student, Rittersteg (Konstantin Karelskiy), injures the Oppenheim family’s driver, Pahinke, under the pretext of self-defense. Vogelzang demands Berthold’s apology by March 1st or his expulsion. Despite the sympathetic school director, Dr. François, urging Berthold to apologize, the young man remains conflicted. Pressured by his father to conform, Berthold sends a letter confirming his attendance at the assembly but takes his own life that evening.

At the school gathering, Dr. François announces Berthold’s death, accuses Vogelzang of causing it, and resigns in protest.

Martin Oppenheim and his wife sell their belongings and flee to France. Edgar Oppenheim’s clinic is raided, and he is arrested during an operation. In prison, he meets Weller, who speaks of resistance efforts by true Germans. After Weller is executed, Edgar is released and escapes Germany with Ruth. They are aided by Richard, who vows to stay and fight for a better Germany, declaring, “Germany will be ours, Ruth!”

== Cast ==
- Vladimir Balashov - Berthold Oppenheim
- Iosif Tolchanov - Martin Oppenheim
- Ada Wójcik - Liselotte
- Nikolai Plotnikov - Edgar Oppenheim
- Galina Minovitskaya - Ruth Oppenheim
- Raisa Esipova - Sybil
- Osip Abdulov - Jacques Lavendel
- S.D. Zykov - Heinrich Lavendel, schoolboy, friend of Bertolt
- Solomon Mikhoels - Jacobi
- Sergey Dnieper - Francois, director of the gymnasium
- Arkady Blagonravov - Lorenz, director of the clinic
- Nikolay Bogolyubov - Weller
- Vladimir Solovyov - Pahinke
- Aleksey Konsovsky - Richard
- Mikhail Astangov - Vogelsang
- Konstantin Karelian - Rittersteg
- Sergey Martinson - Gutwetter poet
- Mikhail Derzhavin - Wells, industrialist
