= Vakhonkino =

Vakhonkino Вахонькино
- Village
- Location within Vologda Oblast Location within Russia
- Coordinates: 59°22′N 37°12′E
- Country: Russia
- Region: Vologda Oblast
- District: Kaduysky District
- Time zone: UTC+3:00

Vakhonkino (Russian: Вахонькино) is a rural locality (a village) in Nikolskoye Rural Settlement, Kaduysky District, Vologda Oblast, Russia. The population was 45 as of 2002.

== Geography ==
Vakhonkino is located 30 km north of Kaduy (the district's administrative centre) by road. Sloboda is the nearest rural locality.
