= Benjamin Chapin =

American stage actor

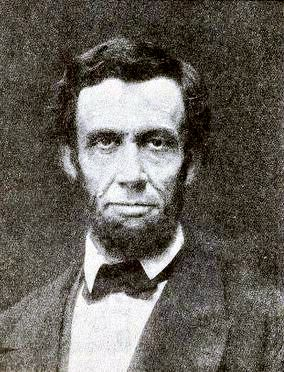
- Born: August 9, 1872; Bristolville, Ohio, United States
- Died: June 2, 1918 (aged 45); Liberty, New York, United States
- Occupation: Actor
- Years active: 1913–1918 (film)

Benjamin Chapin (August 9, 1872 – June 2, 1918) was an American stage actor best known as an impersonator of Abraham Lincoln. From childhood Chapin had an obsession with the assassinated president, and had a lengthy career playing him on the Lyceum circuit and in vaudeville. In 1906 he wrote a play Lincoln which was staged at the Liberty Theatre on Broadway following directly on from a production of the play The Clansman by Thomas Dixon Jr.

In 1917, Chapin wrote and starred in The Lincoln Cycle series of films. Despite the success of the project he was increasingly in ill health, and died in June 1918 from tuberculosis.

== Bibliography ==
- Bruce Babington & Charles Barr. The Call of the Heart: John M. Stahl and Hollywood Melodrama. Indiana University Press, 2018.
