= Bruno Freindlich =

Soviet and Russian actor (1909–2002)

- Бруно Фрейндлих
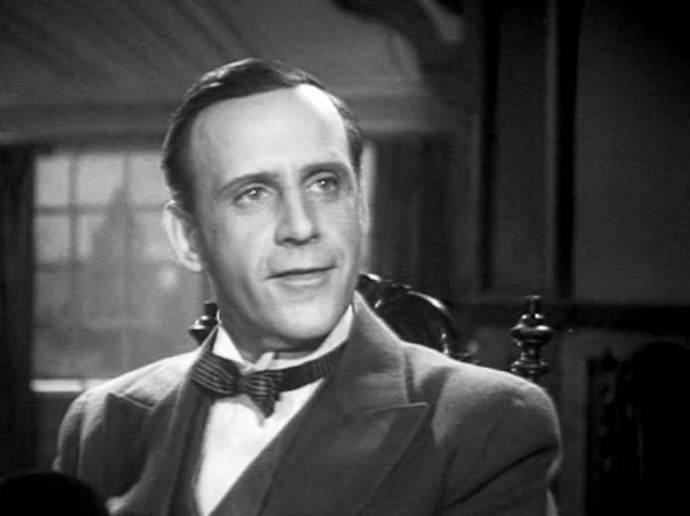
- Freindlich in 1949
- Born: 10 October 1909; Saint Petersburg, Russia
- Died: 9 July 2002 (aged 92); Saint Petersburg, Russia
- Occupation: Actor
- Years active: 1931–2000
- Children: Alisa Freindlich

Bruno Arturovich Freindlich (Note: Russian: Бруно Артурович Фрейндлих, romanized: Bruno Arturovich Freyndlikh; German: Bruno Arturowitsch Freindlich) (10 October 1909 – 9 July 2002) was a Soviet and Russian actor. He received the title of People's Artist of the USSR (1974). His daughter Alisa Freindlich is also a famous actress.

== Biography ==
A native of Saint Petersburg and of German ancestry, Bruno Freindlich began his career as an actor, performing for audiences of children. For two years, he worked at the Bolshoi Theatre of Drama. Since 1948, he has been a leading actor of the former Alexandrine Theatre. Among his stage works were Khlestakov in The Government Inspector and Hamlet in Grigori Kozintsev's staging of Shakespeare's play. He played the roles of Peer Gynt, père Goriot, and Gayev in The Cherry Orchard, and Baron in The Lower Depths. One of the dearest roles of Freindlich, which he played for many years, was the part of writer Ivan Turgenev in the play Elegy. For the role of Guglielmo Marconi in the propaganda film Alexander Popov, he won the Stalin Prize (1951).

== Death ==
Freindlich died in Saint Petersburg at 92 and was buried on 11 July 2002 at the Volkovo Cemetery.

== Partial filmography ==
- Alexander Popov (1949) as Guglielmo Marconi
- Mussorgsky (1950) as César Cui
- Rimsky-Korsakov (1953) as Ramensky
- Belinsky (1953) as Professor Shcheplovidov
- Dirk (1954) as Nikitskiy
- Heroes of Shipka (1955) as Gyula Andrássy
- Twelfth Night (1955) as Feste
- Two Captains (1956) as Ivan Pavlovich Korablyov
- Sofya Kovalevskaya (1956) as Klaus fon Shvedlits
- Don Quixote (1957) as duke
- October Days (1958) as Georgy Polkovnikov
- Fathers and Sons (1959) as Pavel Kirsanov
- Cain XVIII (1963) as Chief of Secret Police
- Two Tickets for a Daytime Picture Show (1967) as Blinov
- Dead Season (1968) as Valery Petrovich
- Thunderstorm over Belaya (1968) as Alexander Kolchak
- Tchaikovsky (1970) as Turgenev
- The Flight (1971) as baron Pyotr Vrangel
- Timur and His Team (1977) as Dr. Kolokolchikov
- A Declaration of Love (1978) as Filippok in old age
- Battle of Moscow (1985, TV Series) as Boris Shaposhnikov
- The Strange Story of Dr. Jekyll and Mr. Hyde (1986) as Pool
- Stalingrad (1990) as Boris Shaposhnikov (final film role)
