= Grigori Roshal =

Soviet film director

- Григорий Рошаль
- Born: 21 October 1899; Novozybkov, Chernigov Governorate, Russian Empire
- Died: 11 January 1983 (aged 83); Moscow, Soviet Union
- Occupations: Film and theater director, screenwriter
- Years active: 1926–1983

Grigori Lvovich Roshal (Russian: Григорий Львович Рошаль; 21 October 1899 – 11 January 1983) was a Soviet film director, screenwriter and pedagogue. People's Artist of the USSR (1967).

== Biography ==
Grigori Roshal was born on 21 October 1899 (according to other sources either on 20 October 1899 or in 1898), in the city of Novozybkov (now Bryansk Oblast, Russia).

After graduating from the Tenishev School in Saint Petersburg, he was employed at the People's Commissariat for Education of Ukraine and Crimea between the years 1918 and 1919. Since 1919, he was an instructor at the People's Commissariat of Azerbaijan, selected as head of the artistic and educational part of the children's playground in Zheleznovodsk. In 1921, he moved to Moscow to work in the People's Commissariat for Russia as an instructor in the school theater, was chairman of the Council on Arts Education Main Department of Social Education and taught the subject of theater at the Central House of the communist education of the working youth.

From 1921 to 1923, he studied at the State Higher Director's Workshops of Vsevolod Meyerhold (GVYRM) created in 1921 by Vsevolod Meyerhold and his pupil Konstantin Derzhavin which were revised in 1923, and conducted under the name GEKTEMAS - State Experimental Theater Workshop in 1931.

Since 1923, he worked as a theater director. He supervised the Pedagogical Workshop Theatre and has staged a number of performances. Until 1927 was the director and artistic manager of the theater.

From 1925, he was director of the third factory of Goskino, the studio Belgoskino, Mezhrabpomfilm and All-Ukrainian Photo Cinema Administration (VUFKU).

As of 1931, he was the director of Mosfilm and director of the Lenfilm film studio in the years 1947-1954.

In 1949, he wrote a chapter on Soviet cinema for the book "Experiment in Film".

Was appointed as teacher at the Gerasimov Institute of Cinematography from 1953 to 1964. In 1957, the headed the All-Union Committee for Work with film enthusiasts under the rule of the Cinematographers Union of the USSR.

In the 1970s, he taught at the Moscow State Art and Cultural University giving a course for new specialist-teachers directing of amateur film studios. Founder and artistic director of the film department in this university.

Grigori Roshal died in Moscow and was buried at the Kuntsevo Cemetery.

== Family ==
- Vera Stroyeva, wife, director and playwright.
- Marianna Roshal-Stroyeva, daughter, director of feature films.

== Selected filmography ==
=== Director ===
- His Excellency (1927)
- Salamander (1928; together with Mikhail Doller)
- A Petersburg Night (1934; together with Vera Stroyeva)
- Dawn of Paris (1936)
- The Oppenheim Family (1938)
- The Artamonov Business (1941)
- Ivan Pavlov (1949)
- Mussorgsky (1950)
- Rimsky-Korsakov (1953; together with Gennadi Kazansky)
- The Sisters (1957)
- Judgment of the Mad (1961)
- Year as Long as Life (1966)

=== Screenwriter ===
- The New Gulliver (1935; together with Aleksandr Ptushko)
- Dawn of Paris (1936; together with Georgy Shakhovskoy)
- The Oppenheim Family (1938; together with Serafima Roshal)
- Mussorgsky (1950; together with Anna Abramova)
- Aleko (1953; together with Anna Abramova)
- Rimsky-Korsakov (1953; together with Anna Abramova)
- Judgment of the Mad (1961)
- Year as Long as Life (1966; together with Galina Serebryakova)
