= Ivan Pavlov (film) =

- Directed by: Grigori Roshal
- Written by: Mikhail Papava
- Starring: Aleksandr Borisov; Nina Alisova; Nikolai Plotnikov; Maryana Safonova
- Cinematography: Vyacheslav Gordanov; Yevgeni Kirpichyov; Mikhail Magid; Lev Sokolsky
- Edited by: Valentina Mironova
- Music by: Dmitry Kabalevsky
- Production company: Lenfilm Studio
- Distributed by: Sovexport
- Release date: 1949
- Running time: 103 minutes
- Country: Soviet Union
- Language: Russian

Ivan Pavlov (Russian: Академик Иван Павлов, romanized: Akademik Ivan Pavlov) is a 1949 Soviet biopic directed by Grigori Roshal and starring Aleksandr Borisov, Nina Alisova and Nikolai Plotnikov. The film portrays the life of the Russian scientist Ivan Pavlov (1849–1936), known for his Pavlov's dog experiments. The film was made during the Stalinist era, despite the fact that Pavlov had been a noted opponent of the Soviet regime.

== Synopsis ==
The film begins in Ryazan in 1875, and tells about the work of Ivan Pavlov from his first steps in science to sensational discoveries which played a huge role in the development of medicine and psychology.

The young doctor Ivan Pavlov wants to live life "honorably and humanely." The path of the scientist is difficult and thorny. The treasury department does not release funds for research nor give access to animals for experimental use, and Pavlov has to buy them on his own savings. The experiments follow one another. Pavlov is pursuing his goal with passion and force. For his work on the physiology of digestion, he is awarded the Nobel Prize. Pavlov paves the way for objective studies of brain function in higher animals. Zvantsev, the assistant of Pavlov is an idealist who has become an ideological opponent of the scientist-materialist, implores him not to interfere with the "sanctuary of the spirit", but Pavlov boldly ignores his opponents-obscurantists. The revolutionary 1917 year comes. Pavlov angrily rejects the proposal of an American agent to go abroad; he decides to forever remain with his people in his homeland.

== Cast ==
- Aleksandr Borisov as Ivan Petrovich Pavlov
- Nina Alisova as Varvara Antonovna Ivanova
- Nikolai Plotnikov as Nikodin Vasilyevich
- Maryana Safonova as Sarafina Pavlova
- Fyodor Nikitin as Gleb Mikhailovich Zvantsev
- Grigory Shpigel as Professor Petrushev
- Vladimir Chestnokov as Lev Zakarich Zabelin
- Vladimir Balashov as Semenov, student-disciple
- Ivan Dmitriyev as Dmitri Pavlov
- Nikolai Cherkasov as Maxim Gorky
- G. Belnikevich as Sergei Mironovich Kirov
- Vasili Sofronov as Arkip Semyonovich Telegin, dying old man
- Vladimir Soshalsky as student
- Pavel Pankov as student

== Bibliography ==
- Beumers, Birgit. Directory of World Cinema: Russia. Intellect Books, 2011.
