= Professor Mamlock =

Professor Mamlock may refer to:

- Professor Mamlock (play), a 1933 theater drama by Friedrich Wolf
- Professor Mamlock (1938 film), a Soviet film based on the play, directed by Herbert Rappaport
- Professor Mamlock (1961 film), an East German film based on the play, directed by Friedrich's son, Konrad Wolf
