= Propaganda in the Soviet Union =

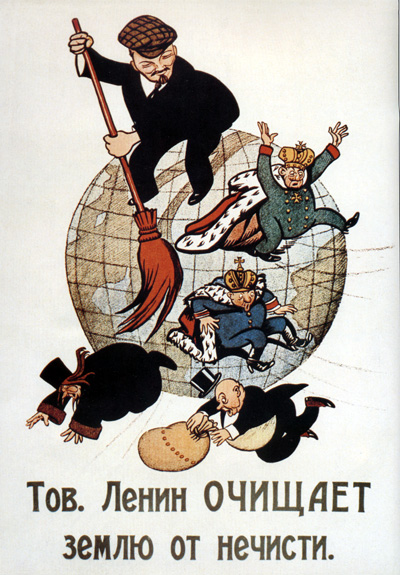
"Comrade Lenin Cleanses Earth of Filth" by Viktor Deni, November 1920

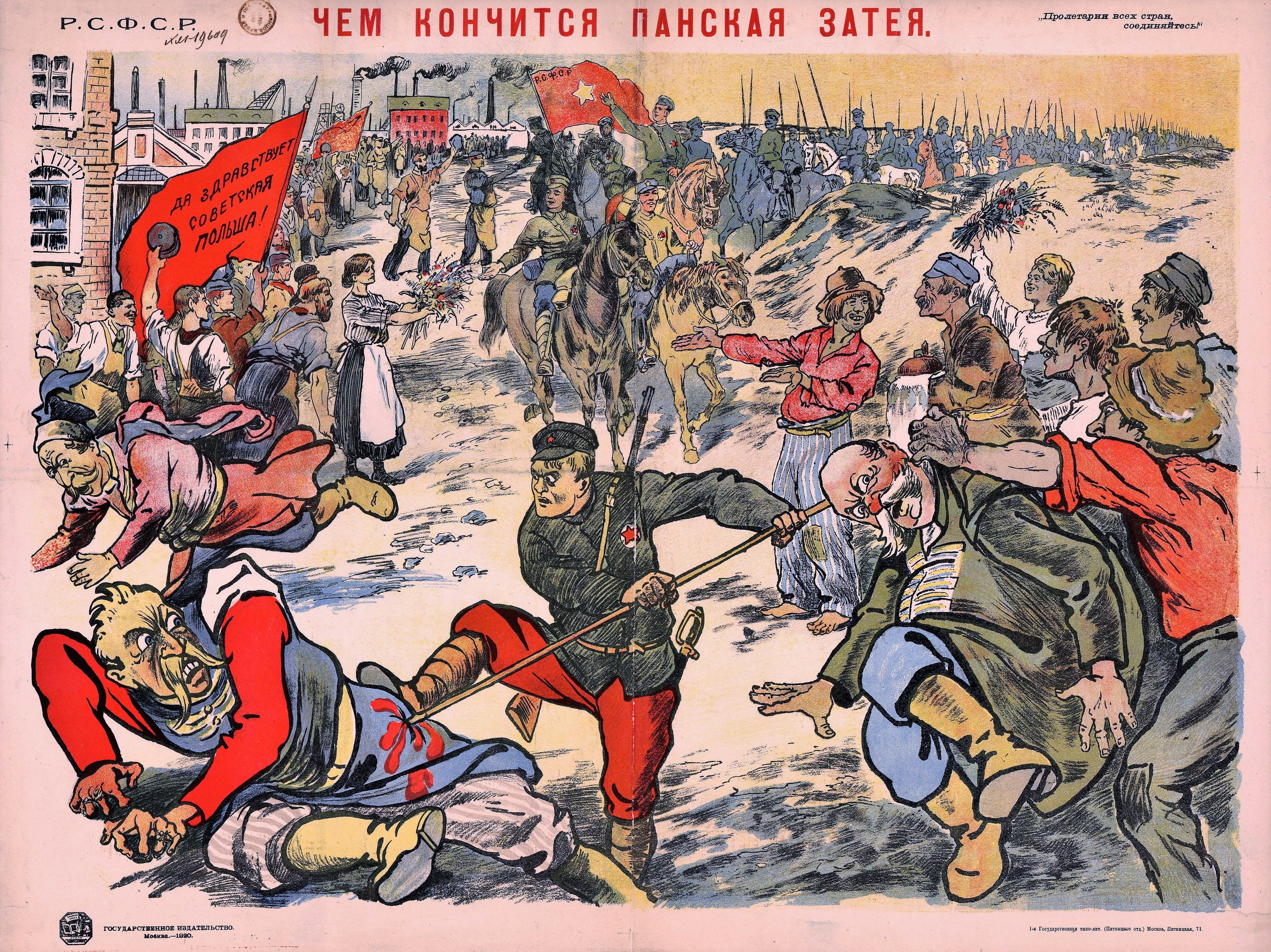
Soviet propaganda poster from the Polish–Soviet War promoting class struggle against Polish landlords, 1920.

In the Soviet Union, propaganda was the practice of state-directed communication aimed at promoting class conflict, proletarian internationalism, the goals of the Communist Party of the Soviet Union, and the party itself.

The main Soviet censorship body, Glavlit, was employed not only to eliminate any undesirable printed materials but also "to ensure that the correct ideological spin was put on every published item." After the death of Joseph Stalin, punitive measures were replaced by punitive psychiatry, prison, denial of work, and denaturalization.

== Theory of propaganda ==
According to historian Peter Kenez, "the Russian socialists have contributed nothing to the theoretical discussion of the techniques of mass persuasion. ... The Bolsheviks never looked for and did not find devilishly clever methods to influence people's minds, to brainwash them." Kenez says this lack of interest "followed from their notion of propaganda. They thought of propaganda as part of education." In a study published in 1958, business administration professor Raymond Bauer concluded: "Ironically, psychology and the other social sciences have been employed least in the Soviet Union for precisely those purposes for which Americans popularly think psychology would be used in a totalitarian state—political propaganda and the control of human behavior."

== Media ==
=== Schools and youth organizations ===
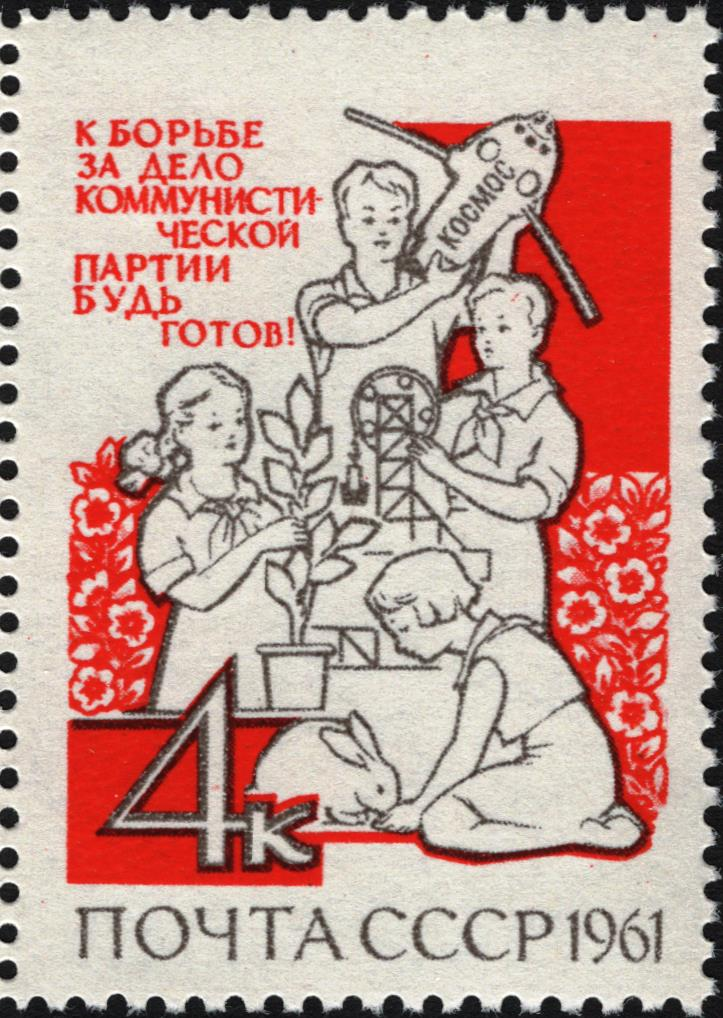
Young Pioneers, with their slogan: "Prepare to fight for the cause of the Communist Party"

An important goal of Soviet propaganda was to create a New Soviet man. Schools and Communist youth organizations such as the Young Pioneers and Komsomol served to remove children from the "petit-bourgeois" family and indoctrinate the next generation into the "collective way of life". The idea that the upbringing of children was the concern of their parents was explicitly rejected. One schooling theorist stated:

We must make the young into a generation of Communists. Children, like soft wax, are very malleable and they should be moulded into good Communists... We must rescue children from the harmful influence of the family... We must nationalize them. From the earliest days of their little lives, they must find themselves under the beneficent influence of Communist schools... To oblige the mother to give her child to the Soviet state – that is our task.

Those born after the Russian Revolution were explicitly told that they were to build a utopia of brotherhood and justice, and to, unlike their parents, be completely Red. "Lenin's corners", "political shrines for the display of propaganda about the god-like founder of the Soviet state", were established in all schools. Schools conducted marches, songs, and pledges of allegiance to Soviet leadership. One of the purposes was to instill in children the idea that they are involved in the world revolution, which is more important than any family ties. Pavlik Morozov, who denounced his father to the secret police NKVD, was promoted as a great positive example despite its fabrication.

Teachers in economic and social sciences were particularly responsible for inculcating "unshakable" Marxist–Leninist views. All teachers were prone to strictly follow the plan for educating children approved by the top for reasons of safety, which could cause serious problems dealing with social events that, having just happened, were not included in the plan. Children of "socially alien" elements were often the target of abuse or expelled, in the name of class struggle. Early in the regime, many teachers were drawn into Soviet plans for schooling because of a passion for literacy and numeracy, which the Soviets were attempting to spread.

The Young Pioneers were an important factor in the indoctrination of children. They were taught to be truthful and uncompromising and to fight the enemies of socialism. By the 1930s, this indoctrination completely dominated the Young Pioneers.

=== Radio ===
The radio was put to good use, especially to reach the illiterate; radio receivers were put in communal locations, where the peasants would have to come to hear the news, such as changes to rationing, and received propaganda broadcasts with it; some of these locations were also used for posters.

During World War II, radio was used to propagandize Germany; German POWs would be brought on to speak and assure their relatives they were alive, with propaganda being inserted between the announcement that a soldier would speak and when he actually did, in the time allowed for his family to gather.

=== Posters ===
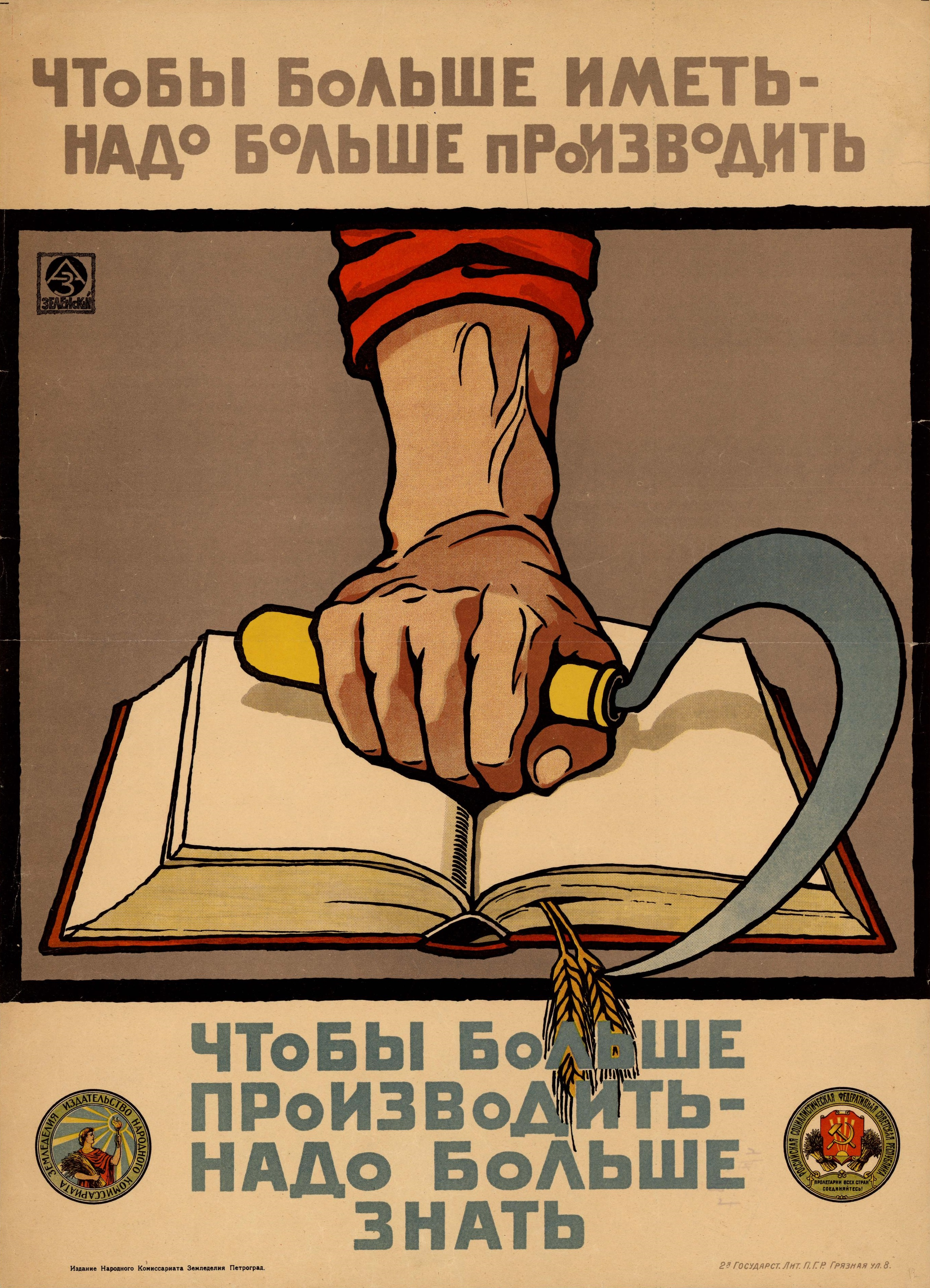
"To have more, we must produce more. To produce more, we must know more"

Wall posters were widely used in the early days, often depicting the Red Army's triumphs for the benefit of the illiterate. Throughout the 1920s, this was continued.

This continued in World War II, still for the benefit of the less literate, with bold, simple designs.

=== Cinema ===
Films were heavily propagandist, although they were pioneers in the documentary field (Roman Karmen, Dziga Vertov). When war appeared inevitable, dramas, such as Alexander Nevsky (1938) were written to prepare the population; these were withdrawn after the Molotov–Ribbentrop Pact, but returned to circulation after the war began.

Films were shown in theaters and from propaganda trains. During the war, newsreels were shown in subway stations so that the poor were not excluded by an inability to pay. Films were also shot with stories of partisan activity, and of the suffering inflicted by the Nazis, such as Girl No. 217, depicting a Russian girl enslaved by an inhuman German family.

=== Propaganda train ===
An institution during World War II was the propaganda train, fitted with presses and portable cinemas, staffed with lecturers. In the Civil War the Soviets sent out both "agitation trains" (Russian: агитпоезд) and "agitation steamboats" (Russian: агитпароход) to inform, entertain, and propagandize.

=== Meetings and lectures ===
Meetings with speakers were also used. Despite their dullness, many people found they created solidarity, and made them feel important and that they were being kept up to date on news.

Lectures were habitually used to instruct in the proper way of every corner of life.

Joseph Stalin's lectures on Leninism were instrumental in establishing that the Party was the cornerstone of the October Revolution, a policy Lenin acted on but did not write of theoretically.

=== Art ===
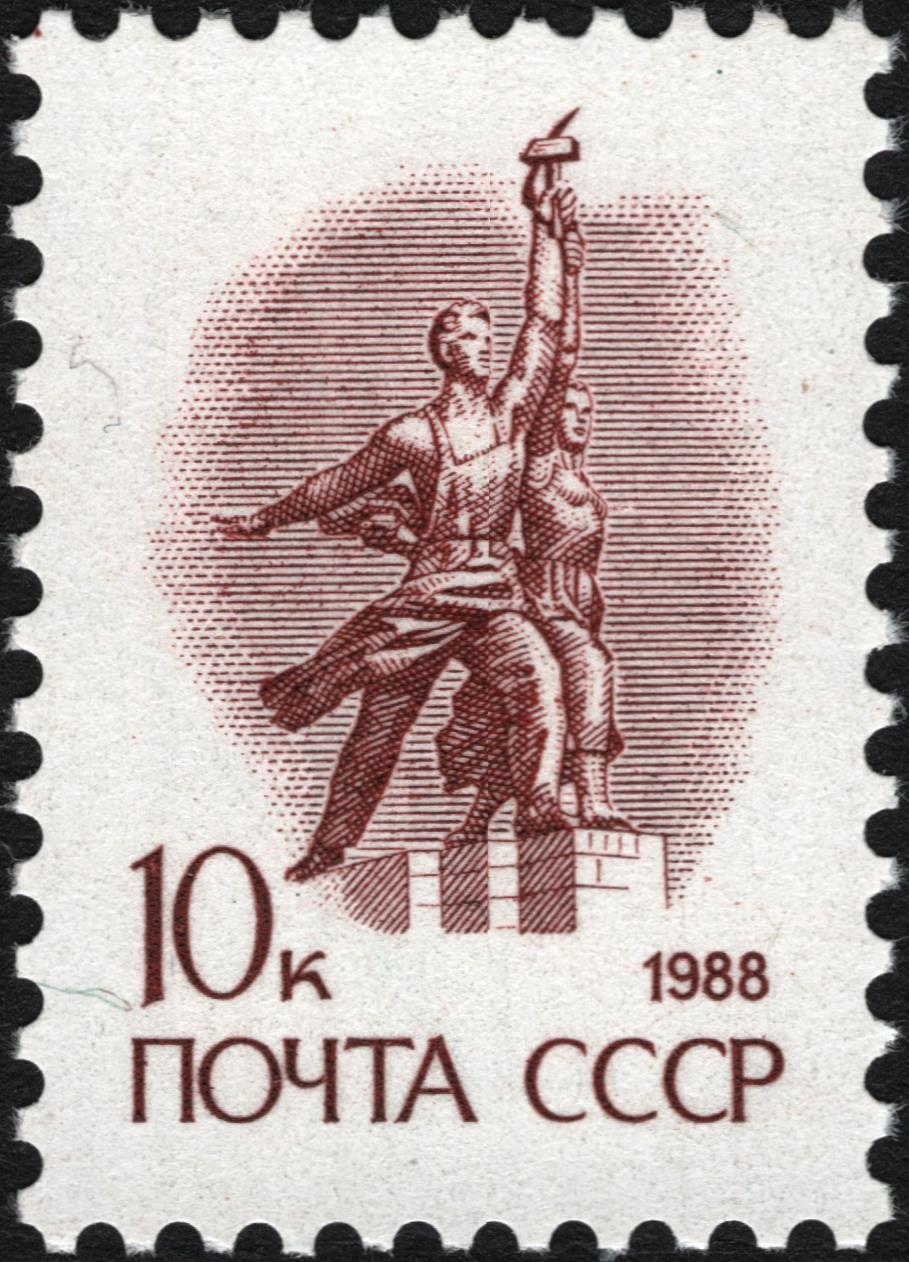
Worker and Kolkhoz Woman commemorated in a stamp

Art, whether literature, visual art, or performing art, was used for the purpose of propaganda. Furthermore, it should show one clear and unambiguous meaning. Long before Stalin imposed complete restraint, a cultural bureaucracy was growing up that regarded art's highest form and purpose as propaganda and began to restrain it to fit that role. Cultural activities were constrained by censorship and a monopoly of cultural institutions.

Imagery frequently drew on heroic realism. The Soviet pavilion for the Paris World Fair was surmounted by Vera Mukhina's a monumental sculpture, Worker and Kolkhoz Woman, in heroic mold. This reflected a call for heroic and romantic art, which reflected the ideal rather than the realistic. Art was filled with health and happiness; paintings teemed with busy industrial and agricultural scenes, and sculptures depicted workers, sentries, and schoolchildren.

In 1937, the Industry of Socialism was intended as a major exhibit of socialist art, but difficulties with pain and the problem of "enemies of the people" appearing in scene required reworking, and sixteen months later, the censors finally approved enough for an exhibition.

=== Newspapers ===
In 1917, coming out of underground movements, the Soviets prepared to begin publishing Pravda.

The very first law the Soviets passed on assuming power was to suppress newspapers that opposed them. This had to be repealed and replaced with a milder measure, but by 1918, Lenin had liquidated the independent press, including journals stemming from the 18th century.

From 1930 to 1941, as well as briefly in 1949, the propaganda journal USSR in Construction was circulated. It was published in Russian, French, English, German, and, from 1938, Spanish. The self-proclaimed purpose of the magazine was to "reflect in photography the whole scope and variety of the construction work now going on the USSR". The issues were aimed primarily at an international audience, especially Western left-wing intellectuals and businessmen, and were quite popular during its early publications, with subscribers including George Bernard Shaw, H. G. Wells, John Galsworthy, and Romain Rolland.

Illiteracy was regarded as a grave danger, excluding the illiterate from political discussion. In part this was because the people could not be reached by Party journals.

=== Books ===
Immediately after the revolution, books were treated with less severity than newspapers, but the nationalizing of printing presses and publishing houses brought them under control. In the Stalinist era, libraries were purged, sometimes so extremely that works by Lenin were removed.

In 1922, the deportation of writers and scholars warned that no deviation was permitted, and pre-publication censorship was reinstated.</ref> Due to a lack of Bolshevist authors, many "fellow travelers" were tolerated, but money only came as long as they toe the party line.

During the Stalinist Great Purges, textbooks were often so frequently revised that students had to do without them.

=== Theatre ===
The revolutionary theater was used to inspire support for the regime and hatred of its enemies, particularly agitprop theater, noted for its cardboard characters of perfect virtue and complete evil, and its coarse ridicule. Petrushka was a popular figure, often used to defend rich peasants and attack kulaks.

== Themes ==
=== New man ===
Many Soviet works depicted the development of a "positive hero" as requiring intellectualism and hard discipline. He was not driven by crude impulses of nature but by conscious self-mastery. The selfless new man was willing to sacrifice not only his life but his self-respect and his sensitivity for the good of others. Equality and sacrifice were touted as the ideal appropriate for the "socialist way of life." Work required exertion and austerity, to show the new man triumphing over his base instincts. Alexey Stakhanov's record-breaking day in mining coal caused him to be set forth as the exemplar of the "new man" and to inspire Stakhanovite movements. The movement inspired much pressure to increase production, on both workers and managers, with critics labeled "wreckers".

This reflected a change from early days, with emphasis on the "little man" among the anonymous labors, to favoring the "hero of labor" in the end of the First Five-Year Plan, with writers explicitly told to produce heroization. While these heroes had to stem from the people, they were set apart by their heroic deeds. Stakhanov himself was well suited for this role, not only a worker but for his good looks like many poster hero and as a family man. The hardships of the First Five-Year Plan were put forth in romanticized accounts. In 1937–38, young heroes who accomplished great feats appeared on the front page of Pravda more often than Stalin himself.

Later, during the purges, claims were made that criminals had been "reforged" by their work on the White Sea/Baltic Canal; salvation through labor appeared in Nikolai Pogodin's The Aristocrats as well as many articles.

This could also be a new woman; Pravda described the Soviet woman as someone who had and could never have existed before. Female Stakhanovites were rarer than male, but a quarter of all trade-union women were designated as "norm-breaking." For the Paris World Fair, Vera Mukhina depicted a monumental sculpture, Worker and Kolkhoz Woman, dressed in work clothing, pressing forward with his hammer and her sickle crossed. Pro-natalist policies encouraging women to have many children were justified by the selfishness inherent in limiting the next generation of "new men." "Mother-heroines" received medals for ten or more children.

Stakhanovites were also used as propaganda figures so heavily that some workers complained that they were skipping work.

The fabricated murder of Pavlik Morozov was widely exploited in propaganda to urge on children the duty of informing on even their parents to the new state.

=== Class enemy ===
The class enemy was a pervasive feature of Soviet propaganda. With the Civil War, the newly formed army moved to massacre large numbers of kulaks and otherwise promulgate a short lived "reign of terror" to terrify the masses into obedience.

Lenin proclaimed that they were exterminating the bourgeoisie as a class, a position reinforced by the many actions against landlords, well-off peasants, banks, factories, and private shops. Stalin warned, often, that with the struggle to build a socialist society, the class struggle would sharpen as class enemies grew more desperate. During the Stalinist era, all opposition leaders were routinely described as traitors and agents of foreign, imperialist powers.

The Five-Year Plan intensified the class struggle with many attacks on kulaks, and when it was found that many peasant opponents were not rich enough to qualify, they were declared "sub-kulaks." "Kulaks and other class-alien enemies" were often cited as the reason for failures on collective farms. Throughout the First and Second Five-Year Plans, kulaks, wreckers, saboteurs and nationalists were attacked, leading up to the Great Terror. Those who profited from public property were "enemies of the people." By the late 1930s, all "enemies" were lumped together in art as supporters of historical idiocy. Newspapers reported even on the trial of children as young as ten for counterrevolutionary and fascist behavior. During the Holodomor, the starving peasants were denounced as saboteurs, all the more dangerous in that their gentle and inoffensive appearance made them appear innocent; the deaths were only proof that peasants hated socialism so much they were willing to sacrifice their families and risk their lives to fight it.

Stalin, denouncing White counter-revolutionaries, Trotskyists, wreckers, and others, particularly aimed his attention at the Communist old guard. The very improbability of the charges was cited as evidence, since more plausible charges could have been invented.

These enemies were rounded up for the gulags, which propaganda proclaimed to be "corrective labor camps" to such an extent that even people who saw the starvation and slave labor believed the propaganda rather than their eyes.

During World War II, entire nationalities, such as the Volga Germans, were branded traitors.

Stalin himself informed Sergei Eisenstein that his film Ivan the Terrible was flawed because it did not show the necessity of terror in Ivan's persecution of the nobility.

=== New society ===
A common theme was the creation of a new, utopian society, depicted in posters and newsreels, which inspired an enthusiasm in many people. Much propaganda was dedicated to a new community, as exemplified in the use of "comrade." This new society was to be classless. Distinctions were to be based on function, not class, and all possessed the equal duty to work. During the 1930s discussion of the new constitution, one speaker proclaimed that there were, in fact, no classes in the USSR, and newspapers effused over how the dreams of the working class were coming true for the luckiest people in the world. One admission that there were classes – workers, peasants, and working intelligentsia – dismissed it as unimportant, as these new classes had no need to conflict.

Military metaphors were used frequently for this creation, as in 1929, where the collectivization of agriculture was officially termed a "full-scale socialist offensive on all fronts." The Second Five-Year Plan saw a slowdown of the Socialist Offensive, this against a propaganda background of trumpeting the USSR's triumphs on "the battlefield of building socialism."

In Stalinist times, this was often portrayed as a "great family", with Stalin as the great father.

Happiness was mandatory; in a novel where a horse was described as moving "slowly", the censor objected, asking why it was not moving speedily, being happy like the rest of the collective farm workers.

Kohlkhoznye Rebiata published bombastic reports from the collective farms of their children. When hot breakfasts were provided for schoolchildren, particularly in city schools, the program was announced with great fanfare.

Since communist society was the highest and most progressive form of society, it was ethically superior to all others, and "moral" and "immoral" were determined by whether things helped or hindered its development. Tsarist law was overtly abolished, and while judges could use it, they were to be guided by "revolutionary consciousness". Under the pressure of the need for law, more and more was implemented; Stalin justified this in propaganda as the law would "wither away" best when its authority was raised to the highest, through its contradictions.

When the draft of the new constitution led people to believe that private property would be returned and that workers could leave collective farms, speakers were sent out to "clarify" the matter.

==== Production ====
Stalin bluntly declared the Bolshevists must close the Tsar-induced fifty- or a hundred-year gap with Western countries in ten years, or "socialism would be destroyed". In support of the Five-Year Plan, he declared being an industrial laggard had caused Russia's historical defeats. Newspapers reported overproduction of quotas, even though many had not occurred, and where they did, the goods were often shoddy.

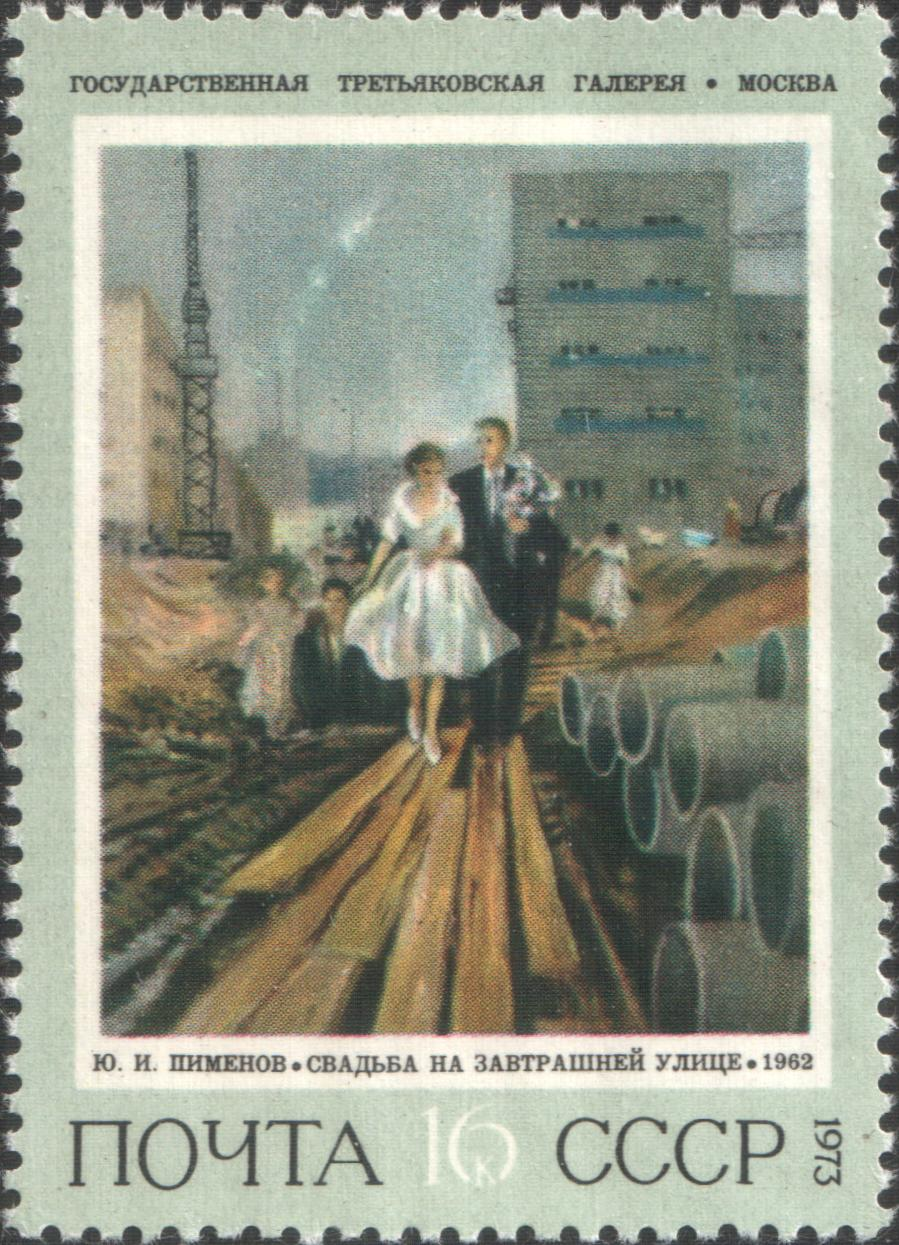
A stamp featuring Pimenov's "Wedding on a Tomorrow Street"

During the 1930s, the development of the USSR was just about the only theme of art, literature and film. The heroes of Arctic exploration were glorified. The twentieth anniversary of the October Revolution was honored with a five volume work glorifying the accomplishments of socialism and (in the last volume) "scientifically based fantasies" of the future, raising such questions as whether the whole world or only Europe would be socialist in twenty years.

Even while a majority of the population was still rural, the USSR was proclaimed "a mighty industrial power." USSR in Construction glorified the Moscow-Volga Canal, with only the briefest mention of the slave labor that had built it.

In 1939, a rationing plan was considered but not implemented because it would undermine the propaganda of improving care for the people, whose lives grew better and more cheerful every year.

During World War II, the slogans were altered from overcoming backwardness to overcoming the "fascist beast" but continued focus on production. The slogan proclaimed "Everything for the Front!" Teams of Young Communists were used as shocktroops to shame workers into higher production as well as spread socialist propaganda.

In the 1950s, Khrushchev repeatedly boasted that the USSR would soon surpass the West in material well-being. Other Soviet officials agreed that the USSR would soon show its superiority because capitalism was like a dead herring – shining as it rotted.

Subsequently, the USSR was referred to as "developed socialism."

=== Mass movement ===
This led to a great emphasis on education.

The first post-mortem attack on Stalin was the publication of articles in Pravda proclaiming that the masses made history and the error of a "cult of the individual."

=== Peace-loving ===
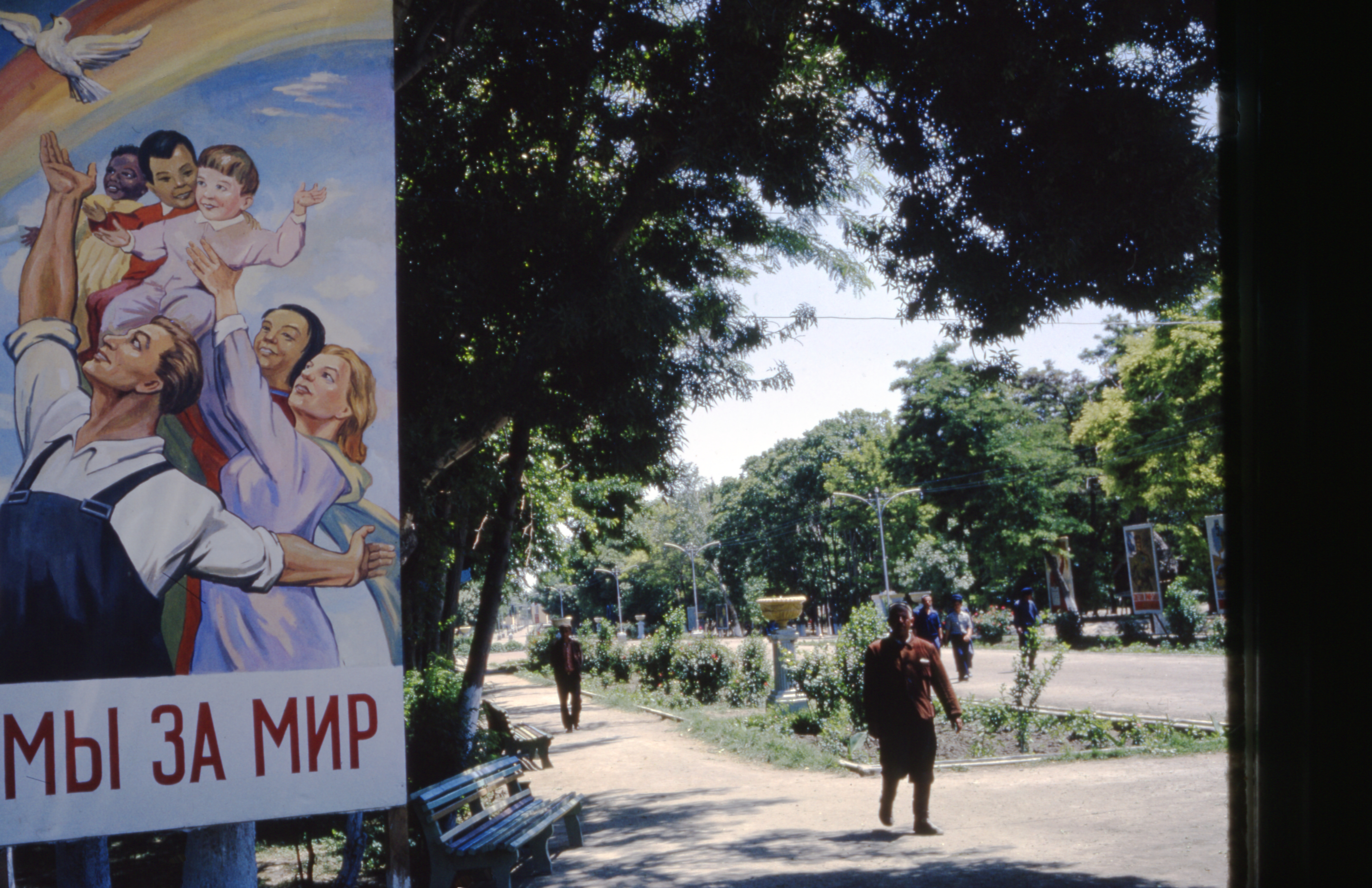
"We are for peace" on a poster in Tashkent, Uzbek SSR, 1964.

A common motif in propaganda was that the Soviet Union was peace-loving.

Many warnings were made of the necessity of keeping out of any imperialistic war, as the breakdown of capitalism would make capitalist countries more desperate.

The Molotov–Ribbentrop Pact was presented as a peace measure.

=== Internationalism ===
Even before the Bolshevists seized power, Lenin proclaimed in speeches that the Revolution was the vanguard of a worldwide revolution, both international and socialist. The workers were informed they were the vanguard of world socialism; the slogan "Workers of the world, unite!" was constantly repeated.

Lenin founded the organization Comintern to propagate Communism internationally. Stalin proceeded to use it to promote Communism throughout the world for the benefit of the USSR. When this topic was a difficulty dealing with the Allies in World War II, Comintern was dissolved. Similarly, "The Internationale" was dropped as the national anthem in favor of the "Hymn of the Soviet Union".

Japanese prisoners of war were intensively propagandized before their release in 1949, to act as Soviet agents.

=== Personality cult ===
While Lenin was uncomfortable with the personality cult that sprung up about him, the party exploited it during the Russian Civil War and officially enshrined it after his death. As early as 1918, a biography of Lenin was written, and busts were produced. With his death, his embalmed body was displayed (to imitate beliefs that the bodies of saints did not decay), and picture books of his life were produced in mass quantities.

Stalin presented himself as a simple man of the people, but distinct from everyday politics by his unique role as leader. His clothing was carefully selected to cement this image. Propaganda presented him as Lenin's heir, exaggerating their relationship, until the Stalin cult drained out the Lenin cult – an effect shown in posters, where at first Lenin would be the dominating figure over Stalin, but as time went on became first only equal, and then smaller and more ghostly, until he was reduced to the byline on the book Stalin was depicted reading. This occurred despite the historical accounts describing Stalin as insignificant, or even a "gray blur", in the early Revolution. From the late 1920s until it was debunked in the 1960s, he was presented as the chief military leader of the civil war. Stalingrad was renamed for him on the claim that he had single-handedly, and against orders, saved it in the civil war.

He often figured as the great father of the "great family" that was the new Soviet Union. Regulations on how exactly to portray Stalin's image and write of his life were carefully promulgated. Inconvenient facts, such as his having wanted to cooperate with the Tsarist government on his return for exile, were purged from his biography.

His work for the Soviet Union was praised in paeans to the "light in the Kremlin window." Marx, Engels, Lenin, and above all Stalin appeared frequently in art.

Discussions of the proposed constitution in the 1930s included effusive thanks to "Comrade Stalin." Engineering projects such as canals were described as having been decreed personally by Stalin. Young Pioneers were enjoined to struggle for "the cause of Lenin and Stalin". During the purges, he increased his appearances in public, having his photograph taken with children, airmen, and Stakhanovites, being hailed as the source of the "happy life," and according to Pravda, riding the subway with common workers.

The propaganda was effectual. Many young people hard at work at construction idolized Stalin. Many people chose to believe that the charges made at the purges were true rather than believing that Stalin had betrayed the revolution.

During World War II, this personality cult was certainly instrumental in inspiring a deep level of commitment from the masses of the Soviet Union, whether on the battlefield or in industrial production. Stalin made a fleeting visit to the front so that propagandists could claim that he had risked his life with the frontline soldiers. The cult was, however, toned down until approaching victory was near. As it became clear that the Soviet Union would eventually win the war, Stalin ensured that propaganda always mentioned his leadership of the war; the victorious generals were sidelined and never allowed to develop into political rivals.

Soon after his death, attacks, first veiled and then open, were made on the "cult of the individual" arguing that history was made by the masses.

Nikita Khrushchev, though leading the attacks on the cult, nevertheless sought out publicity, and his photograph frequently appeared in the newspapers.

==== Trotsky ====
As Stalin drew power to himself, Leon Trotsky was pictured in an anti-personality cult. It began with the assertion that he had not joined the Bolshevists until late, after the planning of the October Revolution was done.

Historical falsification of political events such as the October Revolution and the Brest-Litovsk Treaty became a distinctive element of Stalin's regime. A notable example is the 1938 publication, History of the Communist Party of the Soviet Union (Bolsheviks), in which the history of the governing party was significantly altered and revised including the importance of the leading figures during the Bolshevik revolution. Retrospectively, Lenin's primary associates such as Zinoviev, Trotsky, Radek and Bukharin were presented as "vacillating", "opportunists" and "foreign spies" whereas Stalin is depicted as the chief discipline during this revolution. However, in reality, Stalin was considered a relatively unknown figure with secondary importance at the time of the event.

In his book, The Stalin School of Falsification, Leon Trotsky cited a range of historical documents such as party speeches, meeting minutes, and suppressed texts such as Lenin's Testament. He argued that the Stalinist faction routinely distorted political events, forged a theoretical basis for irreconcilable concepts such as the notion of "Socialism in One Country" and misrepresented the views of opponents through an array of employed historians alongside economists to justify policy manoeuvering and safeguarding its own set of material interests.

=== Propaganda of extermination ===
Some historians believe that an important goal of Soviet propaganda was "to justify political repressions of entire social groups which Marxism considered antagonistic to the class of proletariat", as in decossackization or dekulakization campaigns. Richard Pipes wrote: "a major purpose of Soviet propaganda was arousing violent political emotions against the regime's enemies."

The most effective means to achieve this objective "was the denial of the victim's humanity through the process of dehumanization", "the reduction of real or imaginary enemy to a zoological state". In particular, Vladimir Lenin called to exterminate enemies "as harmful insects", "lice" and "bloodsuckers".

According to writer and propagandist Maksim Gorky,

Class hatred should be cultivated by an organic revulsion as far as the enemy is concerned. Enemies must be seen as inferior. I believe quite profoundly that the enemy is our inferior, and is a degenerate not only in the physical plane but also in the moral sense.

State prosecutor Andrey Vyshinsky frequently demonized "enemies" during Stalin's show trials:

Shoot these rabid dogs. Death to this gang who hide their ferocious teeth, their eagle claws, from the people! Down with that vulture Trotsky, from whose mouth a bloody venom drips, putrefying the great ideals of Marxism!... Down with these abject animals! Let's put an end once and for all to these miserable hybrids of foxes and pigs, these stinking corpses! Let's exterminate the mad dogs of capitalism, who want to tear to pieces the flower of our new Soviet nation! Let's push the bestial hatred they bear our leaders back down their own throats!

=== Anti-religious ===
Early in the revolution, atheistic propaganda was pushed in an attempt to obliterate religion. Regarding religion more as a class enemy, a cause of hate, than a contender for people's minds, the government abolished the prerogatives of the Russian Orthodox Church and targeted them with ridicule. This included lurid anti-religious processions and newspaper articles that backfired badly, shocking the deeply religious population. It was stopped and replaced by lectures and other more intellectual methods. The Society of the Godless organized for such purposes, and the magazines Bezbozhnik (The Godless) and Bezbozhnik u Stanka (The Godless in the Workplace) promulgated atheistic propaganda. Atheistic education was regarded as a central task of Soviet schools. The attempt to liquidate illiteracy was hindered by attempts to combine it with atheistic education, which caused peasants to stay away and which was eventually reduced.

In 1929, all forms of religious education were banned as religious propaganda, and the right to anti-religious propaganda was explicitly affirmed, whereupon the League of the Godless became the League of the Militant Godless.

A "Godless Five-Year Plan" was proclaimed, purportedly at the instigation of the masses. Christian virtues such as humility and meekness were ridiculed in the press, with self-discipline, loyalty to the party, confidence in the future, and hatred of class enemies being recommended instead. Anti-religious propaganda in Russia led to a reduction in the public demonstrations of religion.

Much anti-religious efforts were dedicated to promoting science in its place. In the debunking of a miracle – a Madonna weeping tears of blood, which was shown to be rust contaminating water by pouring multicolored waters into the statue – was offered to the watching peasants as proof of science, resulting in the crowd killing two of the scientists.

They also tried to overthrow the evangelical image of Jesus. The literature of the USSR in the 1920s, following the tradition of the demythologization of Jesus, created in the works David Strauss, Ernest Renan, Friedrich Nietzsche and Charles Binet-Sanglé, put forward two main themes – Jesus' mental illness and his deception. It was only at the turn of the 1920s and 1930s that the Soviet Union's propaganda won the mythological option, namely the denial of the existence of Jesus.

A "Living Church" movement despised Russian Orthodoxy's hierarchy and preached that socialism was the modern form of Christianity; Trotsky urged their encouragement to split Orthodoxy.

During World War II, this effort was rolled back; Pravda capitalized the word "God" for the first time, as religious attendance was actually encouraged. Much of this was for foreign consumption, where it was widely disbelieved, with President Franklin D. Roosevelt condemning both Nazi Germany and the Soviet Union as atheistic regimes which did not permit freedom of conscience. This rollback may have occurred due to the ineffectiveness of the Soviets' anti-religious effort.

=== Anti-intellectualism ===
Between campaigns against bourgeois culture and making the ideology of the Socialist Offensive intelligible to the masses with cliches and stereotypes, an anti-intellectual tone grew in propaganda. Soviet leaders posed as common people, lacking interest in such matters as fine art and ballet, even as they selectively chose from working class culture.

=== Plutocracies ===
In the 1920s, much Soviet propaganda for the outside world was aimed at capitalist countries as plutocracies, and claiming that they intended to destroy the Soviet Union as the workers' paradise. Capitalism, being responsible for the ills of the world, therefore was fundamentally immoral.

Fascism was presented as a terroristic outburst of finance capital, and drawing from the petit bourgeoisie, and the middling peasants, equivalent to kulaks, who were the losers in the historical process.

During the early stages of World War II, it was overtly presented as a war between capitalists, which would weaken them and allow Communist triumph as long as the Soviet Union wisely stayed out. Communist parties over the world were instructed to oppose the war as a clash between capitalist states.

After World War II, the United States of America was presented as a bastion of imperial oppression, with which non-violent competition would take place, as capitalism was in its last stages.

=== Anti-Tsarist ===
Campaigns against the society of Imperial Russia continued well into the Soviet Union's history. One speaker recounted how men had had to serve for twenty-five years in the imperial army, to be heckled by an audience member that it did not matter, since they had had food and clothing.

Children were informed that the "accursed past" had been left far behind them, they could become completely "Red".

=== Anti-Polish ===
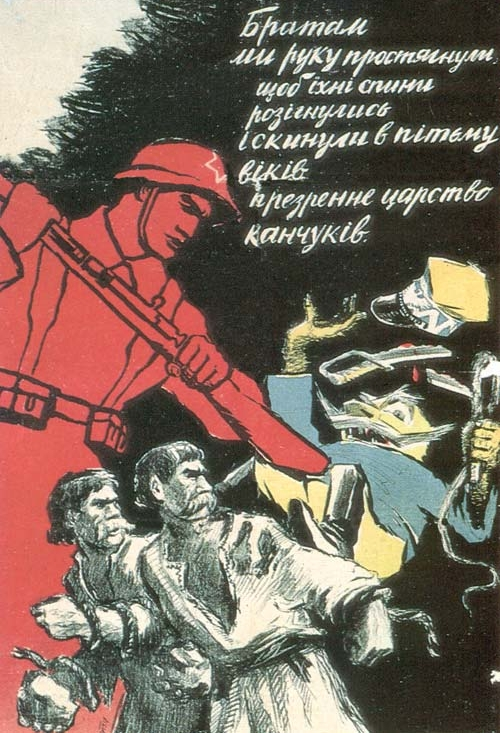
Soviet soldier freeing Ukrainian peasants from Polish lordship, 1939

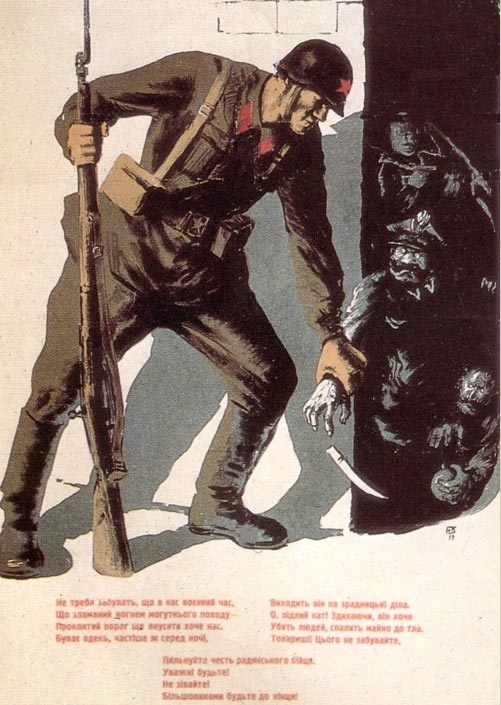
Red Army soldier grabs the knife in the hand of an enemy in a Polish uniform, forcing the knife to drop, 1939

The Soviet press showed little favor towards its neighboring states. Poland was a subject of this approach from the very beginning. In general, the Soviet press portrayed Poland as a fascist state, that belonged to the same club as Germany and Italy.

Anti-Polish propaganda was heavily used in the Polish-Soviet War, when the Bolsheviks sought to subjugate that newly independent nation, in 1920 as well as during the 1939 Soviet invasion of Poland and subsequent annexation of Eastern Poland 1939–1941.

Poland's capitalist government and its chief of state, Marshal Józef Piłsudski, were fierce anti-communists; all parties or groups affiliated with Communist activities were banned and its members sent to Bereza Kartuska concentration camp in eastern Poland. This potentially fueled Soviet propaganda against the Polish state and vice versa. The posters often featured capitalist mustached Poles dressed as lords, barons, nobles or generals holding a whip over enslaved Ukrainians and Belarusians, which were a minority in Poland at the time.

The Soviet Union perpetrated multiple atrocities against the Polish people, most notably the Katyn massacre of military officers and intelligentsia in 1940.

=== Spanish war ===
Many Soviet and Communist writers and artists participated in the Spanish Civil War (Mikhail Koltsov, Ilya Ehrenburg) or supported the Republicans. Popular revolutionary poem Grenada by Mikhail Arkadyevich Svetlov was published in 1926.

=== World War II ===
==== Pre-war anti-Nazi propaganda ====
Professor Mamlock and The Oppenheim Family were released in 1938 and 1939 respectively.

==== Molotov–Ribbentrop pact ====
In the face of massive Soviet bewilderment, the Molotov–Ribbentrop Pact was defended by a speaker in Gorky Park. Stalin himself devised diagrams to show that Neville Chamberlain had wanted to pit the USSR against Nazi Germany, but Comrade Stalin had wisely pit Great Britain against Nazi Germany.

For the duration of the pact, propagandists highly praised Germans. Anti-German or anti-Nazi propaganda like Professor Mamlock was banned.

==== Anti-German ====
After the beginning of Operation Barbarossa, Stalin himself declared in a 1941 broadcast that Germany waged war to exterminate the peoples of the USSR. Propaganda published in Pravda denounced all Germans as killers, bloodsuckers, and cannibals, and much play was made of atrocity claims. Hatred was actively and overtly encouraged. They were told that the Germans took no prisoners. Partisans were encouraged to see themselves as avengers. Ilya Ehrenburg was a prominent propaganda writer.

Many anti-German films in the Nazi era revolved about the persecution of Jews in Germany, such as Professor Mamlock (1938) and The Oppenheim Family. Girl No. 217 depicted the horrors inflicted on Soviet POWs, especially the enslavement of the main character Tanya to an inhuman German family, reflecting the harsh treatment of OST-Arbeiter in Nazi Germany.

Despite their own treatment of religion, a revival of Orthodoxy was permitted during World War II to demonize Nazism as the sole enemy of religion.

Vasily Grossman and Mikhail Arkadyevich Svetlov were war correspondents of the Krasnaya Zvezda (Red Star).

==== Germany vs. Hitlerites ====
Soviet propaganda to Germans during World War II was at pains to distinguish between the ordinary Germans and their leaders, the Hitlerites (Nazis), and declaring they had no quarrel with the people. The only way to discover if a German soldier had fallen alive into Soviet hands was to listen; the radio would announce that a certain prisoner would speak, then give some time for his family to gather and listen, and fill it with propaganda. A National Committee for 'Free Germany' was founded in Soviet prisoner-of-war camps in an attempt to foment an uprising in Germany.

==== Anti-fascism ====
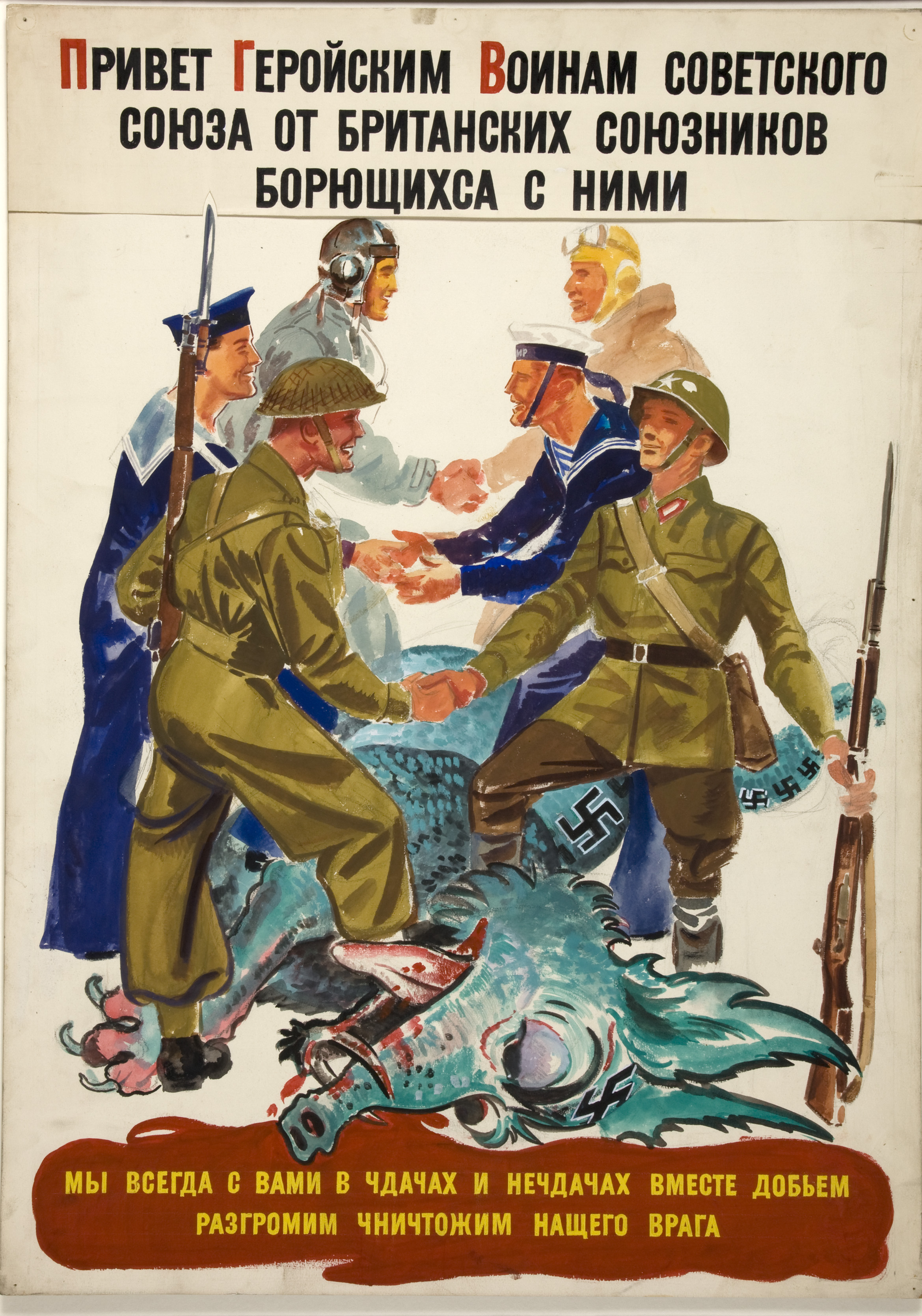
British and Soviet servicemen over body of swastikaed dragon

Anti-fascism was commonly used in propaganda aimed outside the USSR during the 1930s, particularly to draw people into front organizations. The Spanish Civil War was, in particular, used to quash dissent among European communist parties and reports of Stalin's growing totalitarianism.

==== Patriotism/Nationalism ====
In face of the threat of Nazi Germany, the international claims of communism were played down, and people were recruited to help defend the country on patriotic motives. The presence of a real enemy was used to inspire action and production in face of the threat to the Father Soviet Union, or Mother Russia. All Soviet citizens were called on to fight, and soldiers who surrendered had failed in their duty. To prevent retreats from Stalingrad, soldiers were urged to fight for the soil.

Russian history was pressed into providing a heroic past and patriotic symbols, although selectively, for instance praising men as state builders. Alexander Nevsky made a central theme the importance of the common people in saving Russia while nobles and merchants did nothing, a motif that was heavily employed. Still, the figures selected had no socialist connection. Artists and writers were permitted more freedom, as long as they did not criticize Marxism directly and contained patriotic themes. It was termed the "Great Patriotic War" and stories presented it as a fight of ordinary people's heroism.

While the term motherland was used, it was used to mean the Soviet Union, although primarily Russian national heroes were used to inspire the soldiers. Appeals were also made that the home of other nationalities was the home of their own.

Many Soviet citizens found treatment of soldiers who fell into enemy hands as "traitors to the Motherland" as suitable for their own grim determination, and "not a step back" was supposed to inspire soldiers to fight with self-sacrifice and heroism. However, this was in fact realized via NKVD-led barrier troops that shot retreating soldiers in the back.

This continued after the war in a campaign to remove supposed "anti-patriotic elements".

In the 1960s, memories of the Great Patriotic War were revived to bolster support for the regime, with all accounts carefully censored to prevent accounts of Stalin's early incompetence and defeats, and their heavy cost.

== Utopia and space ==
Throughout the history of the Soviet Union, the concept of a socialist utopia was heavily proselytized by the Soviet government. Under the Khrushchev administration, this idea of a Soviet utopia was worked heavily into the concept of space travel and spreading across the world. The accomplishments in space were closely tied to a sense of utopia and the idea that communism was superior to other forms of government. In a press release after Sputnik's launch the Soviet Union states that "...our contemporaries will witness how the freed and conscientious labour of the people of the new socialist society makes the most daring dreams of mankind a reality." The concept of success in science and space exploration were closely tied to the concept of a new socialist society and the utopia that would be created in that society.

== Soviet propaganda abroad ==
Residents of a town in Eastern Poland (now Western Belarus) assembled to greet the arrival of the Red Army during the Soviet invasion of Poland in 1939. The Russian text reads "Long Live the great theory of Marx, Engels, Lenin-Stalin". Such welcomings were organized by the activists of the Communist Party of West Belarus affiliated with the Polish Communist Party, delegalized in Poland by 1938.

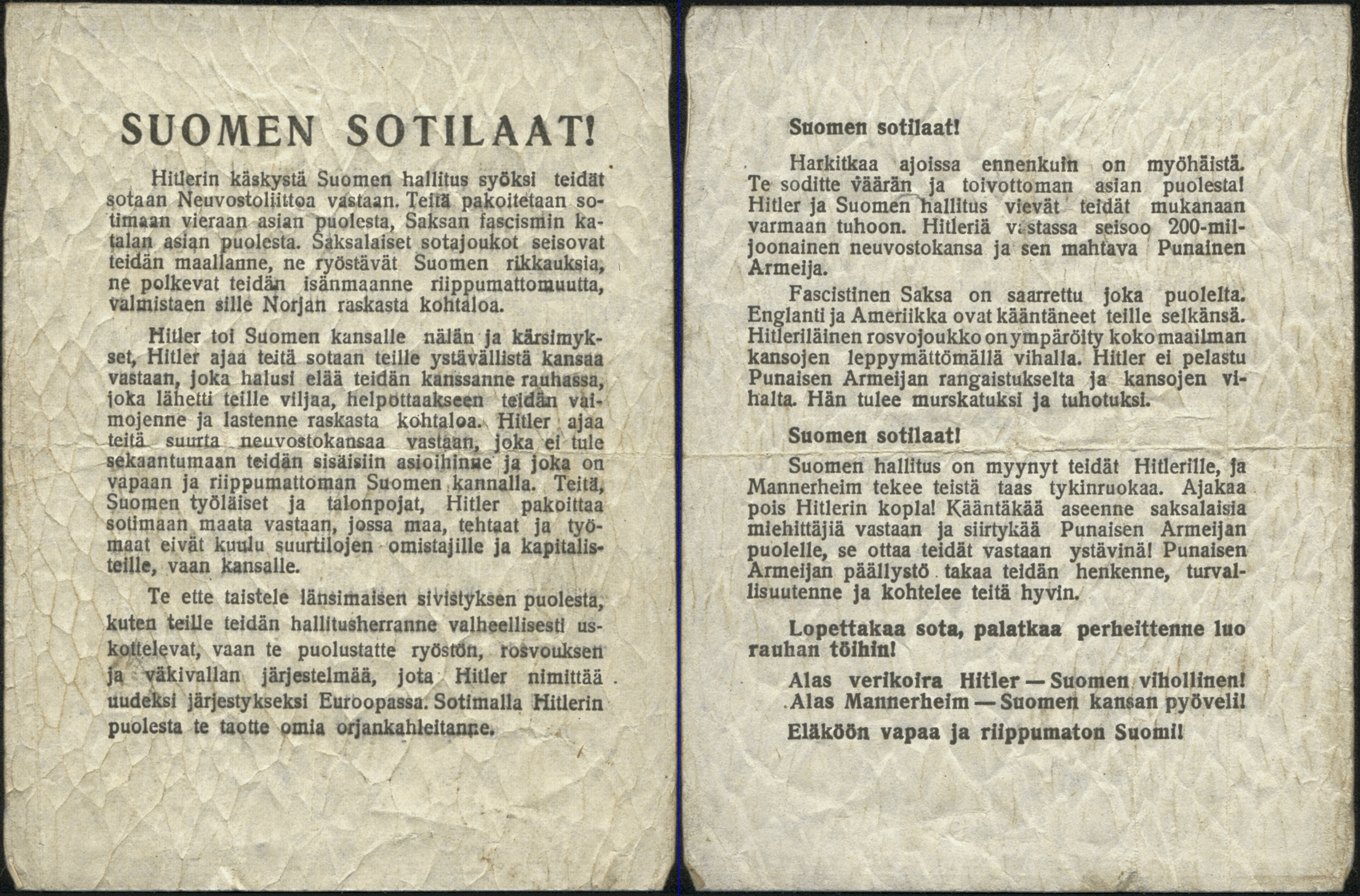
World War II propaganda leaflet dropped from a Soviet airplane on Finnish territory, urging Finnish soldiers to surrender

Trotsky and a small group of Communists regarded the Soviet Union as doomed without the spread of the revolution internationally. The victory of Stalin, who regarded the construction of socialism in the Soviet Union as a necessary exemplar to the rest of the world and represented the majority view, did not, however, stop international propaganda.

In the 1980s, the US Central Intelligence Agency (CIA) estimated that the budget of Soviet propaganda abroad was between $3.5 and $4 billion.

Propaganda abroad was partly conducted by Soviet intelligence agencies. GRU alone spent more than $1 billion for propaganda and peace movements against Vietnam War, which was a "hugely successful campaign and well worth the cost", according to GRU defector Stanislav Lunev. He claimed that "the GRU and the KGB helped to fund just about every antiwar movement and organization in America and abroad".

According to Oleg Kalugin, "the Soviet intelligence was really unparalleled. ... The KGB programs – which would run all sorts of congresses, peace congresses, youth congresses, festivals, women's movements, trade union movements, campaigns against U.S. missiles in Europe, campaigns against neutron weapons, allegations that AIDS ... was invented by the CIA ... all sorts of forgeries and faked material – [were] targeted at politicians, the academic community, at the public at large."

Soviet-run movements pretended to have little or no ties with the USSR, often seen as noncommunist (or allied to such groups), but were controlled by the USSR. The organizations aimed at convincing well-meaning but naive Westerners to support Soviet overt or covert goals. A witness in a US congressional hearing on Soviet cover activity described the goals of such organizations as to "spread Soviet propaganda themes and create false impression of public support for the foreign policies of Soviet Union."

Much of the activity of the Soviet-run peace movements was supervised by the World Peace Council. Other important front organizations included the World Federation of Trade Unions, the World Federation of Democratic Youth, and the International Union of Students. Somewhat less important front organizations included: Afro-Asian People's Solidarity Organization, Christian Peace Conference, International Association of Democratic Lawyers, International Federation of Resistance Movements, International Institute for Peace, International Organization of Journalists, Women's International Democratic Federation and World Federation of Scientific Workers. There were also numerous smaller organizations, affiliated with the above fronts.

Those organizations received in total more than 100 million dollars from the USSR every year.

Propaganda against the United States and the greater Western world included the following actions:

- Claiming that Adolf Hitler faked his death as early as Pravda's evening edition of the day the Soviets captured the Reich Chancellery. Stalin (d. 1953) apparently believed that Hitler escaped. Although there were problems with the remains found by the Soviets (with only—apparently planted—dental remains belonging to Hitler and Eva Braun), they also released disinformation regarding alleged autopsies as well as conflicting accounts of their subsequent disposal of the remains.
- Promotion of John F. Kennedy assassination conspiracy theories, allegedly using writer Mark Lane.
- Discrediting the CIA, using historian Philip Agee (codenamed PONT).
- Spreading rumors that US Federal Bureau of Investigation (FBI) director J. Edgar Hoover was a homosexual.
- Attempts to discredit Martin Luther King Jr. by placing publications portraying him as an "Uncle Tom" who was secretly receiving government subsidies.
- Stirring up racial tensions in the US by mailing bogus letters from the Ku Klux Klan, and spreading conspiracy theories that the assassination of Martin Luther King Jr. had been planned by the US government.
- Fabrication of the story that AIDS virus was manufactured by US scientists at Fort Detrick; the story was spread by Russian-born biologist Jakob Segal.
- Soviet Weekly was published in Britain.
- Sputnik was a monthly edited in Soviet Union in many languages, including English.
- Discounting and downplaying the US military aid given to the Soviets during WWII under the Lend-Lease Act, as well as the US's role in victory in general.

== See also ==
- Censorship in the Soviet Union
- Communist propaganda
- Kukryniksy
- Propaganda in China
- Propaganda in Nazi Germany
- Propaganda in North Korea
- Propaganda in the Polish People's Republic
- Propaganda in Russia
- Propaganda in the United States
- Soviet propaganda music during the Cold War
