= White Acacia =

1957 film by Georgi Natanson

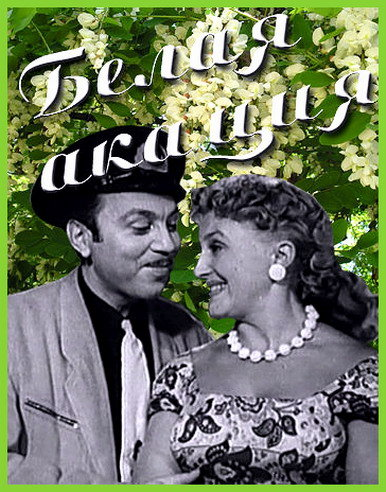
- Russian: Белая акация
- Directed by: Georgy Natanson
- Written by: Mikhail Chervinsky; Vladimir Mass
- Starring: Idaliya Ivanova; Aleksandr Starodub; Yevheniya Dembska; Mikhail Vodyanoy; Nikolay Kochkin
- Cinematography: Yakov Kulish
- Music by: Isaak Dunayevsky
- Release date: 1957
- Country: Soviet Union
- Language: Russian

White Acacia (Russian: Белая акация) is a 1957 Soviet musical comedy film directed by Georgy Natanson.

== Plot ==
The film tells about the girl Tonya, who dreams of traveling by sea and is in love with the captain of the whaling ship Konstantin Kupriyanov, who in turn is in love with Larisa, for whom having fun is the main thing.

== Cast ==
- Idaliya Ivanova as Tosya Chumakova
- Aleksandr Starodub as Kostya Kupriyanov
- Yevheniya Dembska as Larisa
- Mikhail Vodyanoy as Yashka 'Buksir'
- Nikolay Kochkin as Pyotr Timofeyevich Chumakov
- Valentina Franchuk as Olga Ivanovna
- Muza Krepkogorskaya as Katya
- Mikhail Dashevskiy as Korablyov
- Sheva Fingerova as Serafima Stepanovna
- Oleg Shapovalov as Lyosha
- Boris Nikitin as Sasha
- Viktor Aloin as Zhenya Morgunov
- Leonid Marennikov as Film Director (uncredited)
