= Professor Mamlock (1961 film) =

1961 film

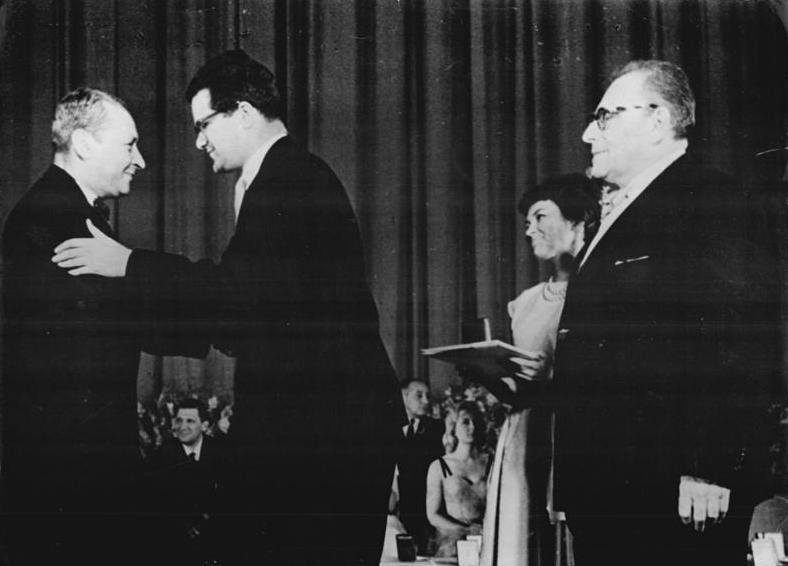
- Sergei Yutkevich greets Konrad Wolf and Wolfgang Heinz during the Moscow Film Festival.
- Directed by: Konrad Wolf
- Written by: Friedrich Wolf; Karl Georg Egel; Konrad Wolf
- Produced by: Hans-Joachim Funk
- Starring: Wolfgang Heinz
- Cinematography: Werner Bergmann
- Edited by: Christa Wernicke
- Music by: Hans-Dieter Hosalla
- Production company: DEFA
- Distributed by: Progress Film
- Release date: 17 May 1961
- Running time: 100 minutes
- Country: East Germany
- Language: German

Professor Mamlock is an East German drama film. It was released in 1961.

== Plot ==
Professor Mamlock, a respected Jewish surgeon, is certain that the Weimar Republic will survive the political crisis of the early 1930s. He disapproves of his son, Rolf, a communist activist who openly opposes the Nazis. When Hitler rises to power, Mamlock loses his work and his dignity. Realizing the mistake he made by being politically apathetic, Mamlock commits suicide. The film ends with his dead face blending away from the screen, on which appears the inscription: "there is no greater crime than not wanting to fight when fight one must." (Es gibt kein größeres Verbrechen, als nicht kämpfen zu wollen, wenn man kämpfen muss)

== Cast ==
- Wolfgang Heinz as Professor Mamlock
- Ursula Burg as Ellen Mamlock
- Hilmar Thate as Rolf Mamlock
- Doris Abeßer as Ruth Mamlock
- Herwart Grosse as Dr. Friedrich Carlsen
- Peter Sturm as Dr. Hirsch
- Harald Halgardt as Dr. Hellpach
- Lissy Tempelhof as Dr. Inge Ruoff
- Manfred Krug as SA man
- Kurt Jung-Alsen as Schneider
- Ulrich Thein as Ernst
- Agnes Kraus as Nurse Hedwig
- Franz Kutschera as Werner Seidel
- Günter Naumann as Kurt Walter
- Günther Grabbert as Simon

== Production ==
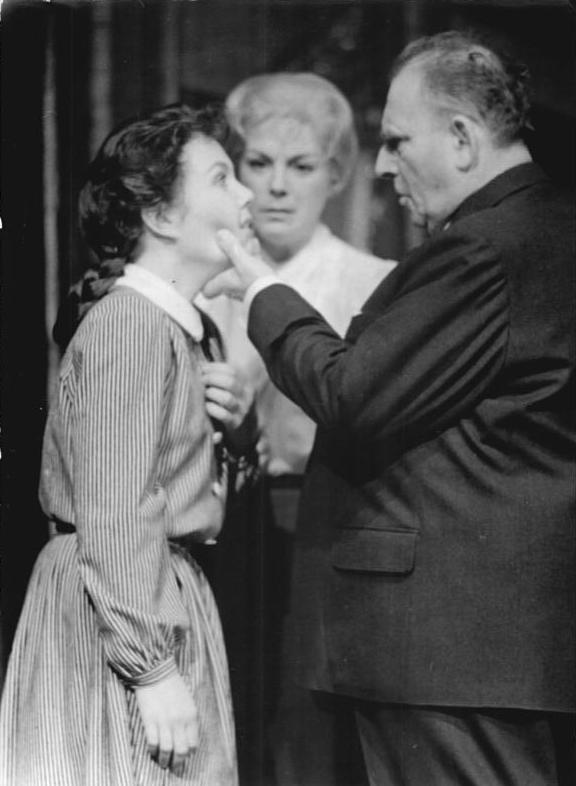
Wolfgang Heinz playing Mamlock in theater, 1959.

The film was adapted from the play Professor Mamlock, written by the director's father Friedrich Wolf during 1933, when he was in exile in France. It featured most of the cast that participated in the 1959 Kammerspiele staging of the play.

When Wolf was asked why he decided to make another film adaptation of the play - the first was done in 1938 - he answered: "our objective was not the persecution of Jews... But the destiny of a liberal intellectual, who is forsaken by his class. This individual no longer believes in the middle class, and yet he does not find his way to the working class. His only escape becomes suicide".

== Reception ==
Professor Mamlock sold 940,000 tickets in East Germany, becoming a modest commercial success. The film won the Gold Prize in the 2nd Moscow International Film Festival on 23 July 1961. Wolf also received the Silver Lotus Award in the II International Film Festival of India, held in New Delhi in November 1961.

Daniela Berghahn considered the film as "paradigmatic" to DEFA's treatment of the persecution of Jews by the Nazis: by contrasting the apolitical, lethargic Mamlock to his son, Rolf, the passionate communist and resistance fighter, Wolf condemned the professor for failing to join the resistance and "utterly scandalously... Made him accountable for his own fate." Anthony S. Coulson analyzed the picture as a belated metamorphosis of the title character, who ceases denying reality only when all is lost: "Mamlock's transformation is presented as a renunciation of his previous self... But that insight comes too late to save him and his kind... His fate is attributed to his failure to fight... Wolf's film reaffirms the political pathos of his father's play."
