= Cherry Town =

1962 film

- Russian: Черёмушки
- Directed by: Herbert Rappaport
- Written by: Mikhail Chervinsky; Isaac Glikman; Vladimir Mass
- Based on: Moscow, Cheryomushki by Vladimir Mass, Mikhail Chervinsky (words), Dmitri Shostakovich (music)
- Starring: Olga Zabotkina; Vladimir Vasilyev; Gennadi Bortnikov; Vasili Merkuryev; Yevgeny Leonov
- Cinematography: Anatoli Nazarov
- Edited by: K. Kozyreva
- Music by: Dmitri Shostakovich
- Release date: 1962
- Country: Soviet Union
- Language: Russian

Cherry Town (Note: The English title is a mistranslation: The name "Cheryomushki" is not related to "cherry", but to "cheryomukha", "hackberry") (Russian: Черёмушки, romanized: Cheryomushki) is a 1962 Soviet musical comedy-drama film directed by Herbert Rappaport. It is based on Dmitri Shostakovich's 1959 operetta Moscow, Cheryomushki.

== Plot ==
Lida Baburova, a tour guide at an architectural museum, unexpectedly receives a two-room apartment in the newly developed Zarechye district, affectionately referred to as "Our Cheryomushki" by its residents. The Baburovs' old house had become unlivable after severe structural damage, including a collapsed ceiling that opened a hole into the upstairs neighbors' flat. Excited to inspect their new home, Lida and her father are met with a shocking discovery: their apartment has effectively vanished. The building manager, Barabashkin, had falsified documents to merge their unit with the neighboring apartment, which belongs to Drebednev, the head of the construction trust. This blatant act of corruption leaves the Baburovs without a home and prompts outrage among the residents.

Meanwhile, Boris, who is infatuated with Lida, seizes the opportunity to help and win her favor. He suggests to Drebednev that his oversized apartment could easily be split into two if his young wife, Vava, were to leave him in a divorce. However, Lida, unwilling to accept a solution based on manipulation, refuses Boris’s assistance. Determined to seek justice, the residents rally together and report the corruption to the construction authorities. Their efforts lead to the Baburovs’ rightful apartment being restored, Barabashkin’s demotion to janitor, and Drebednev, now single, assuming Barabashkin’s former position. Through collective action, the community triumphs over the dishonesty of their leadership, restoring fairness and solidarity among the residents.

== Cast ==
- Olga Zabotkina as Lida
- Vladimir Vasilyev as Boris
- Marina Khotuntseva as Masha
- Gennadi Bortnikov as Sasha
- Svetlana Zhivankova as Lyusya
- Vladimir Zemlyanikin as Sergei
- Vasili Merkuryev as Fedor Drebednev
- Marina Polbentseva as Vava
- Yevgeny Leonov as Barabashkin
