= Wolfgang Heinz (actor) =

Austrian and East German actor and theater director

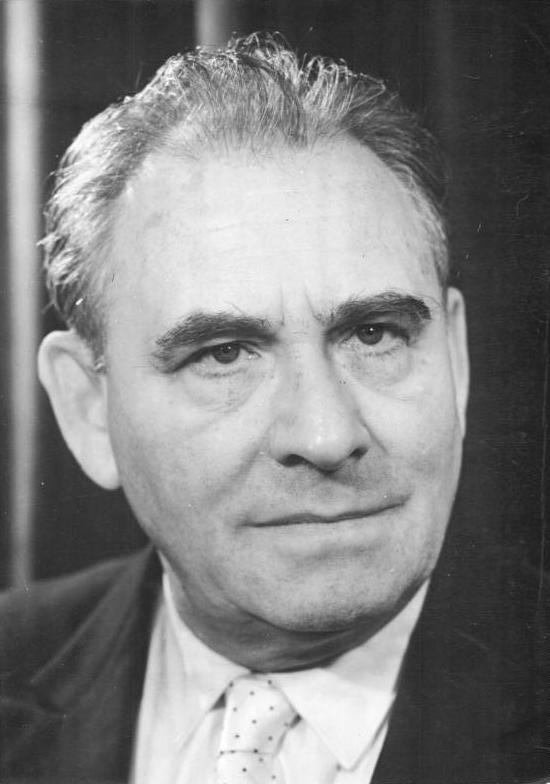
- Wolfgang Heinz in 1959
- Born: David Hirsch; 18 May 1900; Plzeň, Kingdom of Bohemia, Austria-Hungary
- Died: 30 October 1984 (aged 84); East Berlin, East Germany
- Occupations: actor, director
- Years active: 1917–1982
- Spouse: Erika Pelikowsky

David Hirsch (18 May 1900 – 30 October 1984), known as Wolfgang Heinz, was an Austrian and East German actor and theater director. He served as President of the Academy of the Arts in East Berlin between 1968 and 1974.

== Biography ==
=== Early life ===
Born to journalist and theater director Julius Hirsch and his wife Camilla, David Hirsch was the half-brother of Heinrich Theodor Hirsch. He left the Archduke Rainer Gymnasium in Vienna at the age of 17 to pursue an acting career. Heinz was exempted from military service due to a lung illness. He moved to Germany, working in theaters in Friedrichroda and Eisenach during 1917. Although he never attended an acting studio, he was also given roles in theaters in Berlin, Hamburg and other cities. In November 1918, he joined the cast of the Deutsches Theater. He had his debut on screen in the 1919 film Die Geächteten; another of his early roles in cinema was that of the first mate on the Empusa in Nosferatu. He married during 1921, but his wife suffered from Pleurisy and died after six months. Heinz later acted in the Schauspielhaus Berlin, which he left at 1923, when voice problems forced him to abandon his career for three years. In 1926, Max Reinhardt accepted him to the cast of the Deutsches Theater again, where he also started to direct plays. Heinz was a close friend of actor Hans Otto, and under his influence became a member of the Communist Party of Germany at 1930.

=== Exile ===
Along with all the Jewish and leftist actors, Heinz was dismissed from his work on 27 February 1933. He left for the Netherlands, from where he moved to Great Britain, and on to Vienna. He finally settled in Switzerland, in which - with many other exiles from Germany - he acted in the Schauspielhaus Zürich. At 1938, he began to direct plays in the theater. During his time in Switzerland, Heinz was one of the founders and the president of the Swiss Free Austrian Movement. He rescinded his membership in the KPD at 1943.

After the end of World War II, Heinz emigrated to the Soviet-occupied part of Vienna; at 1946, he joined the Communist Party of Austria. At first, he was part of the ensemble of the People's Theater. In 1948, with Karl Paryla and Emil Stöhr, he was a founding member, from 1948 to 1956, of the "Neue Theater in der Scala", a "workers' theater". The theater held a communist and a pro-Soviet line, and openly defied the ban on Bertolt Brecht's works imposed in Vienna. Heinz met his second wife, Austrian actress Erika Pelikowsky, while working in the Scala. He was also active as a director in the Deutsches Theater since 1951. In 1956, after the Soviet withdrawal from Austria, the theater was closed. Heinz, Pelikowsky and their daughter Gabriele (born 1948) moved to East Berlin.

=== East Germany ===
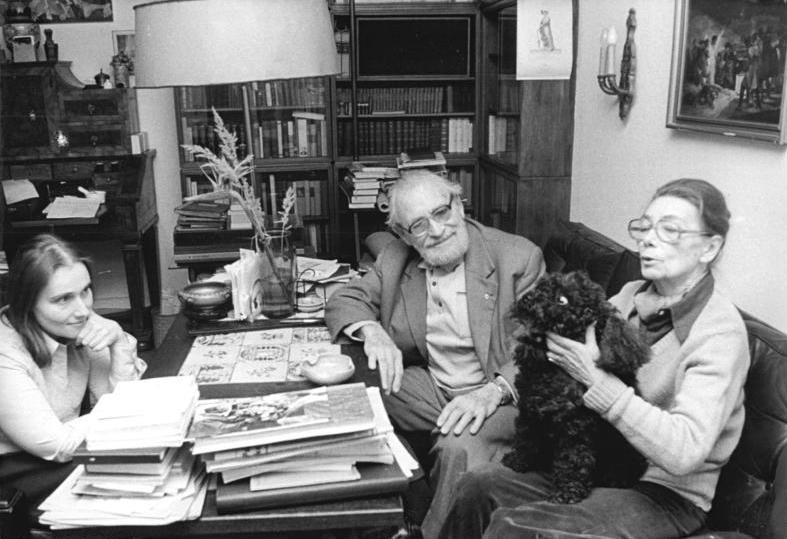
Wolfgang Heinz, his wife Erika Pelikowsky, his daughter Gabriele and their dog Cico celebrating his 80th birthday.

In East Germany, Heinz permanently joined the cast of the Deutsches Theater under Wolfgang Langhoff. He appeared in more than 300 roles, and was best known for his portrayal of the title characters in King Lear, Life of Galileo, Wallenstein, Nathan the Wise and Professor Mamlock. Beside this, he also directed 80 plays through the years and appeared in several DEFA films. From 1959 to 1962, he headed the National Theatre School in Berlin. In 1960, he became a professor and a member of the Academy of the Arts. In 1963, he left the KPÖ and joined the Socialist Unity Party of Germany. At the same year, he replaced Langhoff as the theater's director and manager, holding this position until 1969.

At 1966, Heinz was appointed head of the East German Theater Artists' Association, an office he held until his death. Between 1968 and 1974, he was the president of the Academy of the Arts. In 1975, he had made his last appearance on stage, performing Nathan the Wise; afterwards, he became an honorary member of the Deutsches Theater.

Heinz received the Patriotic Order of Merit in 1965 (with an honorary clasp granted at 1980), the National Prize of East Germany in 1968, the Order of Karl Marx during 1974 and the Goethe Prize of Berlin in 1976. On 30 September 1983, he was granted an honorary citizenship of the city of Berlin by the authorities in East Berlin. After the German reunification Heinz's status was retained by the city council, since his theater career in the capital begun before the communist rule and was independent of it. Heinz is buried in Adlershof Cemetery in Berlin.

After his death, a Wolfgang Heinz Ring was bestowed annually to new and promising young actors by the Theater Artists' Association. Following the reunification, the right to award the ring was passed to the manager of the Deutsches Theater.

== Filmography ==
- 1919: Die Geächteten
- 1920: Humanity Unleashed
- 1922: Nosferatu
- 1932: A Blonde Dream
- 1938: Fusilier Wipf
- 1954: Der Komödiant von Wien
- 1955: Gasparone
- 1958: Geschwader Fledermaus
- 1961: Professor Mamlock
- 1963: Das russische Wunder (narrator)
- 1972: Der kleine Prinz (TV)
- 1973: Der nackte Mann auf dem Sportplatz
- 1978: Nun gut, wir wollen fechten
- 1979: Die Rache des Kapitäns Mitchell (TV)
