= 1938 New York Film Critics Circle Awards =

4th New York Film Critics Circle Awards

4th New York Film Critics Circle Awards

January 3, 1939

Best Picture:
The Citadel

The 4th New York Film Critics Circle Awards, announced on 3 January 1939, honored the best filmmaking of 1938.

== Winners ==
=== Best Picture ===
- The Citadel
- Runner-up – The Lady Vanishes

=== Best Director ===
- Alfred Hitchcock – The Lady Vanishes
- Runner-up – Garson Kanin - A Man to Remember

=== Best Actor ===
- James Cagney – Angels with Dirty Faces
- Runner-up – Spencer Tracy - Boys Town

=== Best Actress ===
- Margaret Sullavan – Three Comrades
- Runner-up – Wendy Hiller – Pygmalion

=== Best Foreign Film ===
- (France) Grand Illusion
- Runner-up – (Soviet Union) Professor Mamlock

=== Special Award ===
- Walt Disney – Snow White and the Seven Dwarfs
