= Herbert Rappaport =

Russian film director

Gerbert Moritsevich Rappaport (Герберт Раппапорт)
- Born: Herbert Rappaport; July 7, 1908; Vienna, Austria-Hungary (now Austria)
- Died: September 5, 1983 (aged 75); Leningrad, Soviet Union (now Russia)

Herbert Rappaport (July 7,1908–September 5, 1983), known in the Soviet Union as Gerbert Moritsevich Rappaport, was an Austrian-Soviet screenwriter and film director.

== Biography ==
Rappaport was born in 1908 in Vienna, Austria-Hungary, to Jewish parents from Lemberg (now Lviv, Ukraine). From 1927 to 1929 he studied law at University of Vienna. Rappaport worked as screenwriter, music editor, and assistant director in Austria, Germany, and the United States from 1928 onward. During the early 1930s he worked as an assistant to Georg Wilhelm Pabst. In 1936 he was officially invited to the Soviet Union to internationalize the Soviet Cinema which he accepted and spent the following 40 years working as a filmmaker there.

Among Rappaport's best known films is Cherry Town (1962), an adaptation of Dmitri Shostakovich's operetta Moscow, Cheryomushki.

In 2008 the first workshow was initiated outside Russia by the Austrian Filmmuseum and SYNEMA-Gesellschaft für Film und Medien, showing about half of his films.

== Filmography ==
- Professor Mamlok (Профессор Мамлок) / Professor Mamlock (1938); with Adolf Minkin
- Gost (Гость) / A Guest (1939); with Adolf Minkin
- Muzykalnaya istoriya (Музыкальная история) / Musical Story (1940); with Aleksandr Ivanovsky
- Vozdushnyy izvozchik (Воздушный извозчик) / The Aerial Cabman (1943)
- Elu tsitadellis / Life in the Citadel (1947)
- Aleksandr Popov (Александр Попов) / Alexander Popov (1949); with Viktor Eisymont
- Valgus Koordis / Light in Koordi (1951)
- Mastera russkogo baleta (Мастера русского балета) / Stars of the Russian Ballet (1953)
- Andruse õnn / Andrus' Happiness (1955)
- Poddubenskiye chastushki (Поддубенские частушки) (1957)
- Vihmas ja päikeses / Rain or Shine (1960)
- Cheryomushki (Черемушки) / Cherry Town (1962)
- Dva bileta na dnevnoy seans (Два билета на дневной сеанс) / Two Tickets for a Daytime Picture Show (1967)
- Chyornye sukhari (Черные сухари) / Black Dried Crust (1972)
- Krug (Круг) / Circle (1972)
- Serzhant militsii (Сержант милиции) / Sergeant of Militia (1974)
- Menya eto ne kasaetsya (Меня это не касается) / It's Not My Business (1976)
