= Professor Mamlock (play) =

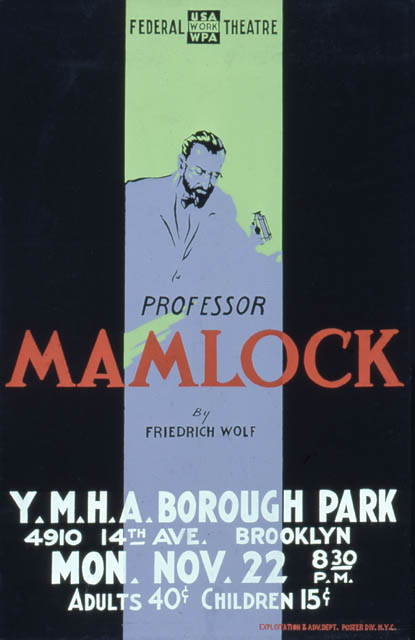
- Poster for the 1937 Federal Theatre Project production in New York City
- Original language: German
- Written by: Friedrich Wolf
- Characters: Prof. Hans Mamlock; Rolf Mamlock; Dr. Carlsen; Dr. Hellpach
- Genre: Tragedy
- Setting: Unspecified city in Germany, 1932–1933.

Premiere
- Date: January 19, 1934
- Place: Warsaw Yiddish Art Theater

Professor Mamlock is a theater play written by Friedrich Wolf in 1933. Portraying the hardships a Jewish doctor named Hans Mamlock experiences under the Hitler regime, it is one of the earliest works dealing with Nazi antisemitism.

== Characters ==
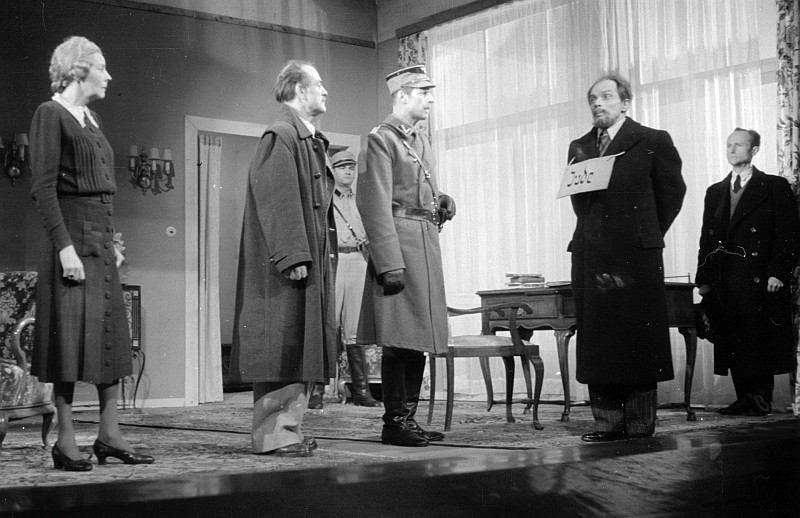
The Berlin premiere of Professor Mamlock, with Walter Franck (carrying sign) in the title role. Hebbel Theater, 9 January 1946.

- Professor Hans Mamlock, a renowned Jewish surgeon and a decorated World War I veteran, holds conservative political views.
- Ellen Mamlock, the professor's non-Jewish wife, holds right-wing views.
- Rolf Mamlock, the professor's son, a committed communist.
- Ruth Mamlock, the professor's daughter, holds right-wing views.
- Doctor Friedrich Carlsen, attending physician who supervises Mamlock's staff in the clinic and his long-time friend.
- Doctor Hirsch, a Jewish physician in the clinic.
- Doctor Hellpach a physician in the clinic, holds right-wing views.
- Doctor Inge Ruoff a female physician in the clinic and a member of the Nazi Party.
- Nurse Hedwig, the clinic's nurse.
- Simon, a Jewish medic in the clinic.
- Werner Seidel, editor of a liberal newspaper, undergoing an operation in the clinic.
- Ernst, a communist, Rolf's friend.

== Synopsis ==
=== Act I ===
Before the May 1932 elections, in Mamlock's clinic.

The personnel and patients in the clinic discuss the political situation. Ruof and Hellpach support Adolf Hitler, while Hirsch and Seidel believe his rise to power will lead to war. Mamlock arrives and forbids conversation about politics in the institute.

=== Act II ===
28 February 1933. Mamlock's house.

Rolf claims the Nazis staged the Reichstag fire; after a heated argument with his father, who disapproves of his political stance, Rolf must move out of the residence. Simon arrives and announces that the SA are searching the clinic for 'non-Aryan' doctors. The government decrees that all communists, pacifists, Jews and other opponents of the new regime will be banned from practicing medicine and holding other offices. Ruoff declares she will not be willing to work under a Jew; Hellpach leaves the clinic to join the SS.

=== Act III ===
April 1933. Mamlock's house.

Mamlock is not allowed to enter his clinic by law, while his daughter Ruth is attacked at school. Ruth and Ellen realize that their early, idealistic support of the Nazis was misguided. When Mamlock attempts to talk with Hellpach, who now runs the institute, he encounters a group of SA men who molest him. He returns home a broken man, carrying a Yellow badge.

=== Act IV ===
The next day, in the clinic.

A new government decree lifts the working ban from all veterans of the First World War. Mamlock and Hirsch return to the clinic. There, Hellpach announces that all 'non-Aryans' who are not subject to the decree will be dismissed. Simon loses his work. Mamlock is revolted by this, and demands justice. He organizes a petition in which he calls upon the government to treat all citizens equally. Hellpach is enraged, and demands from all other personnel to sign an affidavit according to which Mamlock is guilty of various crimes. Mamlock is shocked to see that they all agree to do so – except Ruoff, who rejects her Nazi convictions. He realizes that his friends have abandoned him. Exasperated and despaired, Mamlock tells Inge that she and his son should fight for a better future. Then, he commits suicide.

== History ==
=== Writing ===
Wolf wrote Professor Mamlock shortly after the Reichstag Fire forced him to leave Germany for exile in France; he intended his work to be staged by Gustav von Wangenheim's theater group Truppe 1931. He completed Professor Mamlock while vacating in Île-de-Bréhat. The playwright later told that he conceived the play on the very day after the Fire, when many of his friends called him, blaming him of being a communist and a sympathizer of those who set the Parliament aflame. Consequently, they severed all contacts with him.

While the character of Mamlock bears resemblance to the author himself – a Jewish doctor, married to a non-Jewish wife – there was a real man named Professor Hans-Jacques Mamlok (12 April 1875, Koschmin – 11 November 1940, New York) who was a prominent dentist in Germany before the Nazi takeover. He emigrated to the United States, arriving three days after the opening of Professor Mamlock in New York, in April 1937; although he claimed that the play was based on his life, it is unknown whether Wolf was inspired by him.

Wolf's earliest version of the play – a 1934 type machine manuscript titled Dr. Mamlocks Ausweg. Ein Schauspiel aus Deutschland 1934 von Friedrich Wolf – portrayed also internal Jewish issues: for example, two rich Jewish bankers were indifferent to the plight of a Jewish street peddler harassed by the SA, and the medic Simon became a Zionist and tried to convince Mamlock to emigrate to the British Mandate of Palestine. While these parts remained in the English and Hebrew editions, they were removed from the German one; Wolf's biographer Henning Müller believed it was due to pressure from officials of the Communist Party of Germany: an unsigned review of the play submitted to the party's exiled leadership in Moscow criticized it for "emphasizing the race struggle, while the class struggle remains in the background. The party's role is not sufficiently presented."

The play is considered as one of the earliest artistic treatments of the persecution of Jews in Germany.

=== Stage productions ===
Truppe 1931 was dissolved before it could produce Professor Mamlock, and Wolf's piece was first performed in Yiddish, on the stage of the Warsaw Yiddish Art Theater on 19 January 1934, under the title Der Gelbe Fleck ('The Yellow Badge') (Note: In the original play, Mamlock was forced to wear the badge. In the film adaptations and in several stage productions, his surgeon's robe was emblazoned with the word "Jew"; alternatively, he had to carry a sign with the inscription.) and starring Alexander Granach; André van Gyseghem and Marie Seton, who traveled from Moscow after securing the rights for an English-language production from Wolf, attended the performance. The next stage adaptation – directed by Leopold Lindtberg under the title Professor Mannheim – was in Hebrew, in Tel Aviv's Habima Theatre, and premiered on 25 July 1934 with Shimon Finkel in the main role. Lindtberg also directed the first German-language production, which was held in Schauspielhaus Zürich on 8 December later that year, again by the name Professor Mannheim. Swiss Nazis disturbed the performances: on several occasions, stench bombs were thrown at the stage. When a cheap-ticket performance was carried in Zürich's Stadttheater, armed riot police had to secure the location, making more than a hundred arrests.

Professor Mamlock was translated to English by Anne Bromberger in 1935. In Britain, the play was approved by the Lord Chamberlain Cromer, but its planned performance in the Westminster Theatre in 1935 did not take place, apparently due to silent pressure from the Foreign Office on the background of the Second Italo-Abyssinian War. It was staged there again in 1939. There was a performance in 1937 by The Bermondsey Repertory Company at Spa Road Library Southwark (Ref:The South London Press, June 8th, 1937). Professor Mamloch was played by Lyall Watson. Joseph Greenspun, a friend of Wolf came to Bermondsey to produce the play. The part of Ruth was played by Doris Brown . The script used was the Federal THeatre version, a copy of which is now held in a collection in Colchester. The English-language version of the play, organized by Federal Theatre Project's Jewish Theater Unit and starring Joseph Anthony as Rolf, eventually premiered in New York's Experimental Theater on 13 April 1937, where it ran for seventy-six performances. In New York, it was attended by some 45,750 people. The New York Times reviewer Brooks Atkinson wrote the production "reminds us" the persecution of Jews in Germany "cannot be effectively represented" in theater, as it "may be too great a topic for ordinary make-believe craftsmanship... And this is a theme not for conventional playmakers."

In Sweden, which banned explicit antifascist works due its neutrality and fears from the right-wing press' reaction, Professor Mamlock was the only such play allowed to be performed. Between 1935 and 1943, it was also staged in theaters in Tokyo, Moscow, Amsterdam, Paris, Madrid, Johannesburg, Basel, Oslo, Shanghai, Chongqing and other cities, being viewed by millions. It was the first ever foreign play to be performed in Kazakhstan, where it was produced during the Second World War. After the end of the war, the drama had its German premiere in Berlin's Hebbel Theater, on 9 January 1946, starring Walter Franck. In 1947, a production was staged by the City Theatre of Landsberg am Lech.

Wolf was awarded the National Prize of East Germany 2nd degree on 25 August 1949 for writing Professor Mamlock, and the play was entered into the country's schools' curriculum.

=== Adaptations ===
In 1938, Herbert Rappaport directed the first screen adaptation of Professor Mamlock, filmed in the Soviet Union by the Lenfilm Studio. It starred Semyon Mezhinsky in the title role. A radio drama based on the play was broadcast on Berliner Rundfunk when Wolf worked there as a director. It was aired on 8 November 1945 and had many re-runs. In 1961, the author's son Konrad Wolf directed a second film based on the play, made in East Germany, with Wolfgang Heinz as Mamlock. Between 1963 and 1965, Czechoslovak composer Ladislav Holoubek authored an opera inspired by the theater piece, by the same title.

== Interpretation ==
Peter Bauland commented that the play portrayed the slow, belated transformation of Mamlock from an a-political person who refuses to acknowledge the reality of the Nazi rule and who keeps having faith in the state to a man who realizes the severity of the situation, after enduring countless humiliations; when Mamlock understands that his faith in law and order is misplaced, it is too late. Wolf contrasted the doctor with his son, the active communist Rolf, who urges to resist the new regime by all means, although his father refuses to listen. Rolf's political convictions reflected Wolf's ideology, and Professor Mamlock had an unambiguous political agenda: "The play was, unfortunately, also filled with gratuitous leftist propaganda that added nothing to the drama". John Rodden defined it as a "committed" communist work. When it was taught in East German schools, the teachers were instructed to stress out "the lame resistance to the rise of Hitler by the Weimar Republic and neutral, liberal-humanist professors such as Mamlock." As noted by Manuela Gerlof, the character of Mamlock "embodied the humanist bourgeois." Wolf himself wrote that he aimed the play at "our country's twelve million Mamlocks – the little middle-class intellectuals," and claimed that the a-political, lethargic conduct of those not only allowed the Nazis to maintain power, but led them to it in the first place. According to Gerlof, while using the Jewish environment as a setting, Wolf's play targeted the German conservative worldview as a whole. This was also evidenced by the additional title of the play's edition printed in Zürich at 1935: Doktor Mamlocks Ausweg. Tragödie der westlichen Demokratie ('Dr. Mamlock's Way Out. A Tragedy of Western Democracy').
