= Else Kienle =

German physician (1900–1970)

- Born: Else Ida Pauline Kienle; 1900; Heidenheim an der Brenz, Kingdom of Württemberg, German Empire
- Died: 1970 (aged 69–70); New York City, United States
- Occupations: Physician, author

Else Kienle (1900–1970), later publishing in the United States as Else K. La Roe, was a German physician, author, and sexual-reform advocate. Her 1931 arrest alongside the physician-playwright Friedrich Wolf helped spark a nationwide mass movement for abortion law reform during the late Weimar Republic.

== Life ==
Kienle and Friedrich Wolf were arrested on 19 February 1931 for providing abortions. Their arrests led to popular demonstrations against Paragraph 218, which criminalized abortion in Germany. While the Communist Party of Germany submitted a motion for her release, it objected to her feminist beliefs and gave her considerably less support than it gave Wolf. The Nazi Party supported the imprisonment of Kienle and Wolf because they were Jewish. During her imprisonment, Kienle participated in a hunger strike that brought her near death. She was released from prison on 28 March 1931. In 1932, Kienle published the book Frauen: Aus dem Tagebuch einer Ärztin (transl. Women: From a Woman Doctor's Diary) to criticize Paragraph 218. Kienle believed that it was immoral to force birth into a society that lacked gender equality and social security. Kienle fled to New York after the Nazi Party seized power in Germany.

== See also ==
- Abortion in Germany
- Feminism in Germany
