= Moscow, Cheryomushki =

1956 operetta by Dmitri Shostakovich

- Operetta by Dmitri Shostakovich
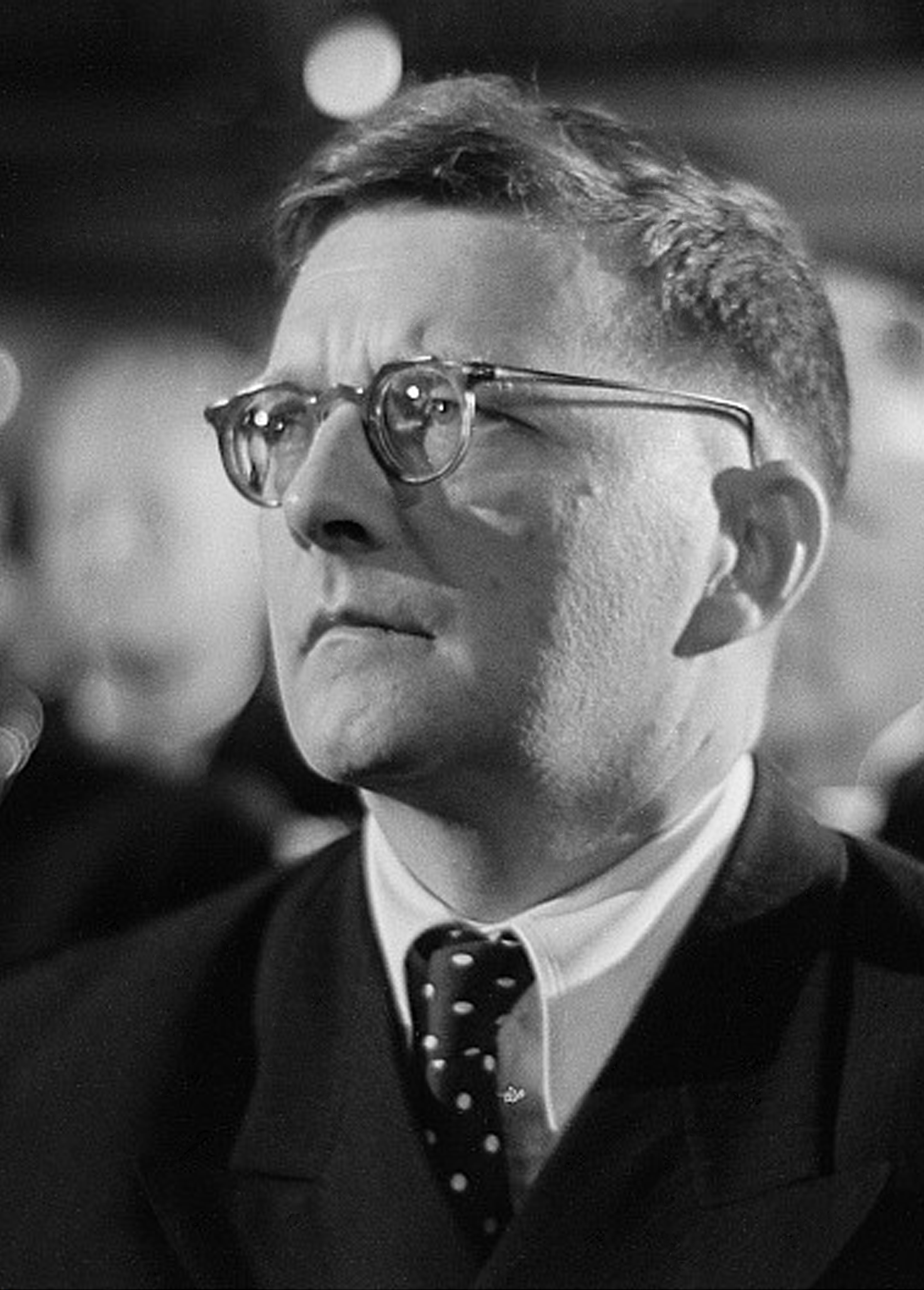
- Dmitri Shostakovich in 1950
- Native title: Russian: Москва, Черёмушки
- Librettist: Vladimir Mass; Mikhail Chervinsky
- Language: Russian
- Premiere: 24 January 1959; Moscow Operetta Theatre

Moscow, Cheryomushki (Russian: Москва, Черёмушки; Moskva, Cheryómushki) is an operetta in three acts by Dmitri Shostakovich, his Op. 105. It is sometimes referred to as simply Cheryomushki. Cheryomushki is a district in Moscow full of cheap subsidized housing built in 1956, and the word is also commonly used for such housing projects in general.

The libretto was written by the experienced team of Vladimir Mass and Mikhail Chervinsky, leading Soviet humorists of the day. The satirical plot dealt with a topical theme geared to one of the most pressing concerns of urban Russians, the chronic housing shortages and the difficulties of securing liveable conditions. 'Cheryomushki' translates to “bird-cherry trees” and the operetta was named after a real housing estate in south-west Moscow.

The work was completed in 1958 and was premiered in Moscow on 24 January 1959. The operetta is reminiscent of Shostakovich's popular music of the period, yet at the same time it engages a satirical assessment of the housing redevelopments in Moscow.

== Composition history ==
Cheryomushki belongs in the category of Shostakovich's lighter works. While this idiom lent the operetta some initial success, the work soon became forgotten in the Soviet operetta repertoire. For a long time the work remained unknown in the West; Shostakovich maintained a low opinion of the work.

The operetta tells the story of a group of friends and acquaintances who have been granted new apartments in this residential development. The different aspects of the housing problem are represented by each of the many characters.

- Sasha, after his recent marriage to Masha, finds that the young couple cannot live together as they have no home. Sasha shares a communal apartment with one of his fellow museum guides, Lidochka and her father, Semyon Semyonovich, while, on the other side of town, Masha shares a room in a temporary hostel.
- Boris is an explosives expert, who sought to settle in Moscow having worked in many parts of the Soviet Union. In the opening of the operetta, Boris encounters an old acquaintance, Sergei, who works as a chauffeur for a high-ranking official. Sergei meets and falls in love with Liusia, a young alluring construction worker from the Cheryomushki site.
- The seven “good” characters are unsurprisingly confronted by enemies with conflicting interests. Fyodor Drebednev is an obnoxious bureaucrat who is responsible for the construction of the Cheryomushki microdistrict and the allocation of the apartments. Drebednov has been married three times, but now has a new partner, Vava, a Machiavellian young woman who uses her affair as a means of acquiring a new apartment. Barabashkin is the lower-rank estate manager, who is likewise corrupt as his superior, Drebednov.

== Performance history ==
Moscow, Cheryomushki was premiered on 24 January 1959 at the Moscow Operetta Theatre conducted by Grigori Stolyarov. Pimlico Opera staged the European premiere at the Lyric Theatre (Hammersmith), London, on 20 October 1994 in a newly commissioned translation by David Pountney and a reduced orchestration by Gerard McBurney. Welsh National Opera produced the work under the title Cherry Town, Moscow in October 2022. Victorian Opera (Melbourne) titled it Melbourne, Cheremushki for their 2023 production at the Arts Centre Melbourne.

== Roles ==
Roles, voice types, premiere cast
Role	Voice type	Premiere cast, 24 January 1959 Conductor: Grigori Stolyarov
Alexander (called Sasha), a guide at the Museum of the History and Reconstruction of Moscow	baritone	
Masha, Sasha's wife	mezzo-soprano	
Lidochka, a fellow museum guide of Sasha's	soprano	
Semyon Semyonovich, Lidochka's father	bass	
Boris (called Borya), an explosives expert	tenor	
Sergei, works as a chauffeur for a high-ranking official and an old acquaintance of Boris	tenor	
Liusia, a young and alluring construction worker from the Cheryomushki site	soprano	
Fyodor Drebednev, a bureaucrat who works at the Cheryomushki construction site and who allocates apartments	tenor	
Vava, having an affair with Drebednev	soprano	
Barabashkin, a lower-rank estate manager	baritone	

== Synopsis ==
Time: 1950s
Place: Cheryomushki District in southwest Moscow

=== Act 1 ===
The old house where Sasha, Lidochka and her father lived subsides. Consequently, Sasha and his wife Masha, as well as Lidochka and her father, are granted newly built apartments in Cheryomushki. The group are driven to the estate by Sergei, who knows Cheryomushki since his on-off girlfriend Liusia worked there, and by Boris, who has fallen in love with Lidochka. Unfortunately, when they arrive, the estate manager Barabashkin is unwilling to hand over the keys, restricting access to many of the apartments.

=== Act 2 ===
Since Barabashkin will not give up the keys, Boris cunningly uses the construction crane to lift Lidochka and her father into their new apartment through their window. While they are settling into their new home, Drebednov and Barabashkin abruptly burst through a hole in the wall from the adjacent flat. The new occupants are ejected, but Barabashkin's intentions are uncovered. He has refused to give Lidochka and her father the keys in order that Drebednov, who allocated the adjacent apartment to his girlfriend, could please her by illegally taking two apartments and joining them together to make more luxurious accommodation. By doing this, the old lecher tried to ensure Vava's continuing devotion. After the corruption of Drebednov is revealed, Sasha and Masha hold a housewarming party at their flat, where the good characters agree to defeat Drebednov and Barabashkin.

In the closing scene, Boris attempts to exploit a previous liaison with Vava by making love to her when he knows Drebednov will see them, thus undermining their affair. However, his underhand plot is dismissed by his idealistic friends, who seek a less realistic solution. Liusia helps the tenants create a magic garden, complete with a bench, where bureaucrats are not heard and only the truth is told. Consequently, Drebednov and Barabashkin confess their crimes and are vanquished. They all live happily ever after.

== Interpretations ==
The operetta is one of Shostakovich's longest compositions and includes pastiches of various musical genres and styles.

Shostakovich criticized his own work. Just days before the opera's premiere at the Moscow Operetta Theatre, he wrote to his friend Isaac Glikman:

I am behaving very properly and attending rehearsals of my operetta. I am burning with shame. If you have any thoughts of coming to the first night, I advise you to think again. It is not worth spending time to feast your eyes and ears on my disgrace. Boring, unimaginative, stupid. This is, in confidence, all I have to tell you.

Soviet ethnomusicologists have long asserted that Cheryomushki is abundant with intonations of popular Soviet material. In the second fantasy scene, “Lidochka and Boris’s Duet”, Shostakovich parodies the nationalist aesthetics of the Mighty Handful. This is the scene in which the infatuated Boris smuggles Lidochka into her apartment on the crane. With its mock medieval melody, the parallel fifths in the bass line and the use of a horn solo, the orchestral introduction recalls a retrospective style, reminiscent of Yaroslavna's arioso from Borodin's opera Prince Igor or the first bars of the "bardic" slow movement from Borodin's 2nd Symphony.

== Screen adaptation ==
In 1963, Lenfilm released a film version directed by Gerbert Rappaport, under the shorter title Cheryomushki. The film featured additional music by Shostakovich.

== English adaptation ==
Pimlico Opera recorded the piece with an English libretto in 1995 on tape and CD, distributed with BBC Music Magazine, volume 3, number 8.

The Pimlico version was presented fully staged by "Young Friends of Opera" (later to become "Opera Factory") in 1998 in Auckland, New Zealand. Director Carmel Carroll, music director Claire Caldwell, choreography Mary-Jane O'Reilly, design John Eaglen. The cast of more than 50 included in lead roles Deidre Harris, Sarah Kent, Harriet Moir, Rebecca Samuel, Andrew Buchanan, John Humphries, Sebastian Hurrell, Wade Kernot and Chris Vovan.

One recent English adaptation of the libretto was written by Meg Miroshnik, and produced at Chicago Opera Theater in April 2012. This version used a reduction of the original orchestral score for 14 players commissioned by Pimlico Opera in 1994 by Gerard McBurney.

An English-language production of Moscow, Cheryomushki under the name Cherry Town, Moscow will be performed by WNO Youth Opera in the Wales Millennium Centre in 2022, with a new English translation by David Pountney.

== Instrumental arrangements ==
A suite for orchestra was arranged in 1997 by Andrew Cornall for a Decca recording by Riccardo Chailly. A suite arranged for cello and piano was made by Matthew Barley and performed by him and Stephen De Pledge on their 2005 album Reminding. There is also a Suite for two or three pianos, performed for three at Lugano as part of Martha Argerich's festival in 2011.
