= Gennadi Bortnikov =

Russian and Soviet actor

- Геннадий Бортников
- Bortnikov as Rodion Raskolnikov
- Born: Gennadi Leonidovich Bortnikov; 1 April 1939; Moscow, RSFSR, USSR
- Died: 24 March 2007 (aged 67); Moscow, Russia
- Occupation: actor
- Years active: 1962–2007
- Awards: Honored Artist of the RSFSR (1973); People's Artist of Russia (1992)

Gennadi Leonidovich Bortnikov (Russian: Генна́дий Леони́дович Бо́ртников; 1 April 1939 – 24 March 2007) was a Russian and Soviet actor.

== Biography ==
His mother was a housewife, father and brother both pilots. After seven years at the school he enrolled in the engineering College, which was never finished. Went to work at a machine-building plant and after work, he went to attend night school. In 1962 he graduated from the School-Studio of MHAT and was accepted into the troupe of the Mossovet Theatre.

For many years Bortnikov was one of the leading actors of the theater, the most significant work Raskolnikov in Petersburg dreams and Smerdyakov in the Brothers Karamazov by Fyodor Dostoyevsky, the main role in the play based on the novel The Сlown by Heinrich Böll.

In the movie Bortnikov debuted in 1961 the film Adult Children; the largest job starring role Soviet spy in the film Blasted Hell. He also appeared in the 1978 film Centaurs.

Was fond of painting. As an artist and the author of the costumes Bortnikov has designed several performances.

Gennady Bortnikov died on 24 March 2007 from a heart attack. He was buried at Vvedenskoye Cemetery.

Bortnikov never married.
