= Soviet propaganda music during the Cold War =

In the Soviet Union, especially during the Cold War, all music produced was generally expected to conform to the ideals of the party.

== Background ==
The Resolution of 1932 mandated music nationalism and also brought about a trend towards more conventional compositions. This brought about the formation of party guidelines for all creative work. The reason for the Resolution of 1932 was to expand the spheres of already organized artists, as well as produce new artist organizations which would be under Party control.

Socialist realism in Soviet music was considered to be "progressive music". The music was used as a "literary concept" to emphasize the ideal of the "Soviet man", and opposed folk-negating modernistic/bourgeois art.

== Red Army Ensemble and Choir ==
The Red Army Ensemble is the official army choir of the Russian Armed Forces, also known as the "Red Army". It was formed in 1928, specifically on October 12 when 12 members made its first presentation. During the Cold War, it was known for performing propagating Soviet songs.

Alexander Vasilyevich Alexandrov was the first artistic director of the Red Army Ensemble. He was a major-general, a folk-artist, a composer, and a professor at the Moscow Conservatory. He believed he could use his music to help the Soviet Union during the War. He was once quoted to say: "How could I help my Motherland, at sixty years of age? I had never held a rifle in my hands and certainly was not a military specialist. And all the same I did hold in my hands a mighty weapon which could strike the enemy- it was the song! What could I give to the front, to the fighters, to the commanders, to the political workers? Songs!" He remained the artistic director of the Red Army Ensemble for 18 years until his son, B.A. Aleksandrov took his place in 1946.

During the Cold War, the Red Army Ensemble played songs by composers like Vasily Solovyov-Sedoi, Anatoli Novikov, Matvey Blanter and Boris Mokrousov. They played all kinds of music, including, but not limited to, folk tunes, church hymns, operatic arias, and popular music. One of their more popular and propagating songs is the "Guard Song", which is a song about the heroism of the guards of the Red Army.

Today, the Ensemble is made up of 186 people. There are 9 soloists, a choir of 64 people, an orchestra of 38 people, and even an eclectic dance group. The Red Army Ensemble has won numerous awards (including the prestige of becoming an academic organization), played in over 70 countries, and now has a repertoire of over two thousand works.

== Mass song ==
Mass songs are characterized by several characteristics that most of them seem to share. They intrinsically belong to the Socialist Realism genre, which supported the Communist Party and sought progressive music that creatively depicted reality in the revolutionary era. Mass songs are often patriotic and optimistic. Their message is usually clear so that nearly anyone listening can understand it. The actions, people, and settings described within the song are intentionally vague so that the overall theme appears generalized to any situation. These songs also praised the Red Army, and attempted to positively portray mothers. Many mass songs were also written about pure, traditional love; others show direct religious influences.

The Soviet organization Prokoll is credited with the creation of the mass song. The organization was founded in 1925 and established most likely in response to previously failed attempts at creating accessible propaganda music. The influence of mass songs spread far beyond this initial organization, eventually influencing famous, noteworthy composers like Dmitri Shostakovich and Sergei Prokofiev. An example of a mass song would be "Youth", set to music composed by Shostakovich. In it, a group of young "volunteers" get on a train and go east. By being optimistic, simple, and vague, it meets several of the main criteria for mass songs. Other songs, such as Ivan Dzerzhinsky's "The Cossack Song", attained international acclaim.
