= Yevheniya Dembska =

Ukrainian actress (1920–2019)

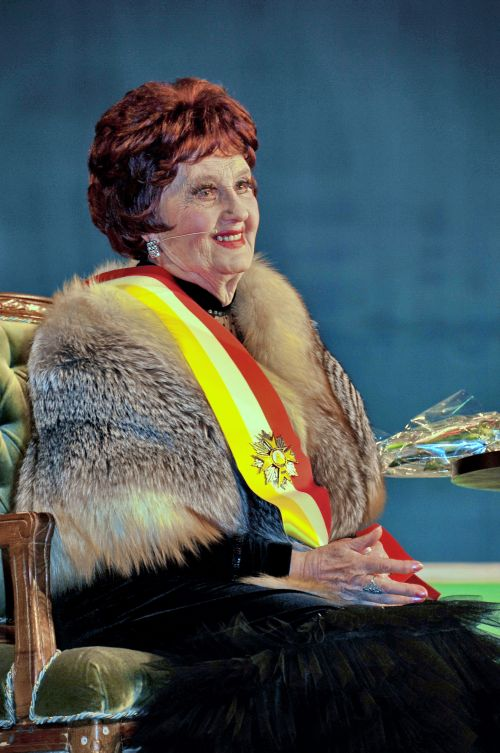
Yevheniya Dembska

Yevheniya Mykhaylivna Dembska (Ukrainian: Євге́нія Миха́йлівна Де́мбська, romanized: Yevheniia Mykhailivna Dembska; 28 November 1920 – 29 June 2019) was a Ukrainian theatre and cinema actress.

== Early life ==
Yevheniya Mykhaylivna Dembska was born in Kyiv to a musical family with three daughters - Yevheniya (also transcribed as Yevgeniya or Eugenia) and sisters Valentina and Neonila. At age three, she lost her father. She graduated from the Kyiv Musical College (1939), she studied at the Kyiv Conservatory (1939-1941).

== Career ==
Beginning in 1940 she was a soloist of the Kyiv theater of small forms. She performed In Klein Kunst Theater in 1945.

At the end of the war, together with the troupe, she ended up in Hungary, and appeared before Soviet soldiers. She moved to Lviv, where she performed in the repatriate club.

She graduated from the Lviv Conservatory in 1946. She performed with Mikhail Vodyan in concerts as a soloist of the Lviv Philharmonic. Also in 1946 she participated in the creation of the Lviv Theater of Musical Comedy. In 1953, together with the theater, she moved to Odesa, performing as the leading soloist of the Odesa Academic Theater of Musical Comedy. She appeared in films from 1957 to 2019.

== Personal life ==
Her first husband, pianist Alexander Katz, was called up to the Red Army in 1939 and died in the liberation of Kyiv. Her second husband was Alexey Petrovich Krinitsky, a lawyer. Dembska died on 29 June 2019 in Odesa, aged 99. She was buried on 1 July at the Second Christian Cemetery of Odesa.

== Recognition ==
- People's Artist of Ukraine (2000)
- Order of Princess Olga 3d class (2007)
