= Mikhail Chervinsky =

Soviet Playwriter

- Михаил Черви́нский
- Born: Mikhail Abramovich Chervinsky; 13 June 1911; Odessa, Kherson Governorate, Russian Empire
- Died: 2 August 1965 (aged 54); Moscow, Russian SFSR, Soviet Union
- Resting place: Donskoye Cemetery
- Occupation: Screenwriter
- Spouse: Sarra Yulievna
- Children: 2
- World War II
- Allegiance: Allies
- Branch: Red Army
- Service years: 1941-44
- Theatre: Eastern Front
- Awards: Order of the Red Star; Medal "For the Victory over Germany in the Great Patriotic War 1941–1945"

Mikhail Abramovich Chervinsky (Russian: Михаил Абрамович Черви́нский; 13 June 1911 — 2 August 1965) was a Soviet screenwriter and poet.

== Biography ==
Chervinsky was born to a Jewish family in Odessa, Odessa uezd on 13 June 1911. He lived in Leningrad, received an education in engineering, and was a prolific writer. Chervinsky was first published in 1940. He married Sarra Yulievna and had a son, Alexander Chervinsky, and a daughter, Natalia Chervinskaya.

Mikhail Chervinsky participated in the Great Patriotic War from 1941-1944. After being seriously wounded on the front lines, he ended up in Moscow and began his joint work with Vladimir Mass. Their first production Somewhere in Moscow was a resounding success and after opening in Vakhtangov Theatre went on tour to the country's theaters.

Their second production, On Friends and Comrades, was not as successful, though. It was released at an inopportune time as the Anti-cosmopolitan campaign was still going on. The authors were both victims of this campaign but managed to avoid arrest.

This didn't discourage Chervinsky as he continued creating literary works alongside Mass. He produced songs for many popular Soviet musicians such as Leonid Utesov and Eddie Rosner. Chervinsky would write skits and entire plays for Soviet celebrities. His most famous works are the so-called 'Soviet operetta' such as White Acacia.

Chervinsky died on 2 August 1965, in Moscow. His ashes were buried in the 15th lot of Donskoye Cemetery. He is buried alongside his wife Sarra Yulievna (1910–1974).

== Works ==
Created with Vladimir Mass

- Comedies such as Somewhere in Moscow, Cherry Town, and various others
- Operettas like White Acacia (1957)
- Songs and poems
- The book Comedies. Soviet Writer, 1968.
