= Professor Mamlock (1938 film) =

- An advertisement for Professor Mamlock, published in the New York Times on the day of its American premiere.
- Directed by: Herbert Rappaport; Adolf Minkin
- Written by: Friedrich Wolf (original play); Adolf Minkin
- Produced by: V. Zotov
- Starring: Semion Mezhinsky
- Cinematography: Georgi Filatov
- Edited by: A. Ruzanovo
- Music by: Yuri Kochurov; Nikolai Timofeyev
- Production company: Lenfilm
- Distributed by: Amkino (United States)
- Release dates: 5 September 1938 (USSR); 7 November 1938 (US)
- Running time: 92 minutes
- Country: Soviet Union
- Language: Russian

Professor Mamlock (Russian: Профессор Мамлок) is a 1938 Soviet drama film, directed by Herbert Rappaport and Adolf Minkin. It is one of the earliest films directly dealing with the persecution of Jews in Nazi Germany.

== Plot ==
Professor Mamlock, a successful and respected Jewish surgeon, does his best to ignore the political crisis of the Weimar Republic. He is greatly troubled by the political tendencies of his son, Rolf, a passionate communist who is determined to resist the strengthening Nazi Party by all means. When the Nazis seize power and brutally crush all opposition, Mamlock is forced to leave his clinic for Jews are no longer allowed to practice medicine. He is dragged through the streets by SA men who emblazon his doctor's robe with the word "Jew". Mamlock, broken and humiliated, attempts suicide; at the last moment, an SA man arrives and convinces him to operate once more, to save the life of a high-ranking Nazi, promising that his rights will be restored. But Mamlock's hopes are frustrated when a Nazi activist in the clinic convinces the other doctors to blame him for various misdemeanors he did not commit. In the meantime, his son Rolf and another communist are arrested and brutally tortured. They escape and are hunted down by the police. When they hide in a store, the SA besiege them. A large crowd gathers in support of the communists, and the Nazis intend to shoot at them. Professor Mamlock, who hears the commotion from his house, carries a speech calling on the people to resist, having finally realized that his political apathy was a mistake. The SA kill him. Rolf, who has escaped, becomes leader of a new resistance movement.

== Cast ==
- Semyon Mezhinsky as Prof. Mamlock
- S. Nikitina as Mrs. Mamlock
- Oleg Zhakov as Rolf Mamlock
- Robert Colléy as Ethiopian Astronaut
- Georgi Budarov as Willi
- Natalia Faussek as Mother Wendt
- Tatyana Guretskaya as Anni Wendt
- Pyotr Kirillov as Ernst
- Valentin Kiselyov as Werner Seidel
- Yakov Malyutin as SA leader
- Vasili Merkuryev as Krass
- Nina Shaternikova as Dr. Inge Ruoff
- M. Shelkovsky as Detective
- P. Sukhenov as SA man
- Boris Svetlov as Dr. Karlsen
- M. Tagyanosova as Nurse Jadwiga
- Yuri Tolubeyev as Fritz
- Anna Zarzhitskaya as Hilda
- I. Zonne as Dr. Wagner

== Production ==
German author Friedrich Wolf composed a theater play by the same name while in French exile, during 1933. It was first performed in Warsaw's Yiddish Theater. Director Rappaport saw it in a Moscow theater and decided to adapt it to screen, albeit with considerable differences form Wolf's play: among others, portraying the protagonist being executed rather than committing suicide. Georges Sadoul recalled the playwright told him that during World War II, he visited a Red Army unit at the front; many of those present watched the film. He was asked to recount the plot of Professor Mamlock, which he did based on the play — "the soldiers judged his summary so inaccurate that he might have been shot" had an officer not recognized him. The film rights to the play were purchased by Joseph Stalin, and he ordered the film to be shown in all Red Army barracks. Semyon Mezhinski, who played the title rôle, was subsequently decorated by Stalin for his performance.

The film is considered as the first ever made about the Holocaust. Principal photography took place in Leningrad.

== Reception ==
Professor Mamlock opened in sixteen cinemas in Moscow, and was released in three hundred copies in the Soviet Union. Within the first eight days after its release, it had 370,000 admissions. Twenty-five copies were made for export to Europe, and a duplicate negative was sent to the United States to enable manufacturing new copies there.

On 15 April 1939, about eight months after its release, Chairman of the State Cinema Committee Semen Dukelsky reported in a memorandum that Professor Mamlock was already viewed by some 16 million people in the Soviet Union. On 1 February that year, Semion Mezhinsky was awarded the Order of the Red Banner of Labour for his portrayal of Mamlock.

In Britain, although Professor Mamlock was shown in private by the London Film Society, the British Board of Film Censors announced beforehand that the film would be rejected; Anthony Aldgate and James C. Robertson wrote that it was viewed as an "uncompromising assault on a point of German domestic policy". When the distributors presented the board with the picture on 12 May 1939 - in the hope that Czechoslovakia's occupation by Germany would change the censors' position - it took two weeks to agree to bar it from the cinemas of the United Kingdom. Herbert Morrison later recalled that the ban "was given in the days when it was thought that you must not do anything offensive to Herr Hitler". The distributors then turned to the London County Council, which allowed a screening; it took place in late August 1939. On 14 September, after the war broke, the BBFC reversed its decision, although it censored some scenes, and it was shown in Nottingham in November. The picture was released in February 1940. Member of Parliament John McGovern later alleged that "it is not for the Government to allow anybody to speak for the victims, just as they would not allow Professor Mamlock to be shown in this country before the war, but only later when it suited their own purpose." Due to pressure from the German embassy, Professor Mamlock was also banned in China, where it ran for only two days before being removed from circulation on 16 August 1939. After the signing of the Molotov–Ribbentrop Pact, French censors banned the film because of its Soviet origin.

When the picture premiered in New York, it enjoyed an unprecedented success for a Soviet movie, and was screened in 103 different cinemas in the metropolitan area; the Kristallnacht, which occurred two days after its premiere, drew the public's attention to the subject matter and contributed to its popularity. The New York Times critic Frank S. Nugent wrote that the "...Long-overdue indictment of Nazi persecution of the Jews has arrived at last... It has come from Russia... that is beyond Hollywood's anxiety about the foreign market." Nugent described the film as "engrossing, sincere, admirably played" but added that because of the "Soviets' insistence on throwing a clove of propaganda... None of its virtues completely counterbalances the burden." He concluded the producers "used the persecution of the Jews as a selfish political argument". The film was the runner-up for the Best Foreign Film Award in the 1938 New York Film Critics Circle Awards. Edward G. Robinson later declared: "I would give my teeth to do an American version of Professor Mamlock, that great story of a Jewish doctor in Nazi Germany". Professor Hans-Jacques Mamlok, a German-Jewish dentist who immigrated from Berlin to America and claimed that Wolf's play was inspired by him, sued the picture's distributors for a compensation of 100,000 Dollars and demanded to remove the film from cinemas, claiming it presented him as a communist sympathizer.

Several cities in the United States forbade showing Professor Mamlock. The Chicago censors declared it to be "purely Jewish and Communist propaganda against Germany" on 11 November 1938; Ohio, Massachusetts and Rhode Island banned it as well. Annette Insdorf wrote that "what must have made American censors really nervous is that it is a political film that places its faith in Communism." Author Kenneth R. M. Short considered the film as part of the Soviet anti-German propaganda campaign that took place between Hitler's rise to power and the Molotov–Ribbentrop Pact. Patricia Erens also viewed the picture as having "a clearly communist message" but as addressing the Jewish question directly, more than as merely a setting for expressing political ideals: "it clearly singles out Jews as enemies of the Third Reich". However, the film received a certificate of approval from the Hays Office on 20 February 1939 — after being subjected to two minor cuts — the first Soviet picture to receive one such. Eventually, all the banning states reversed their decisions, either due to public pressure or to court rulings.

In 1940, MP Sydney Silverman claimed that the film was "achieving success as a medium of anti-Nazi propaganda", not only in Britain "but in the United States of America and other neutral countries as an instrument of propaganda on behalf of the Allied cause".

After the signing of the Pact in August 1939, Professor Mamlock was banned overnight also in the Soviet Union, along with all other anti-fascist works; its removal from the screening schedule of the 1939 New York World's Fair's Soviet Pavilion was interpreted in the American press as an attempt to indulge the Germans. The ban was lifted when the Soviet-German War began on 22 June 1941; Wolfgang Leonhard recalled that it was re-introduced to cinemas already on the 23rd. It was temporarily banned again in July, this time because the portrayal of the Germans was deemed too sympathetic. The film was shown to Red Army troops during the Battle of Moscow. In September 1941, after the Anglo-Soviet invasion of Iran, it was also screened in Teheran "with great success", according to Pravda. In 1947, it was released in Germany.

Jeremy Hicks suggested that, considering the frequency in which Holocaust survivors whose testimonies are stored in the Steven Spielberg Foundation mentioned the film as impressing upon them "the murderous nature of Nazi anti-Semitism", the film may have helped some Soviet Jews to survive.
