= Friedrich Wolf (writer) =

German writer (1888–1953)

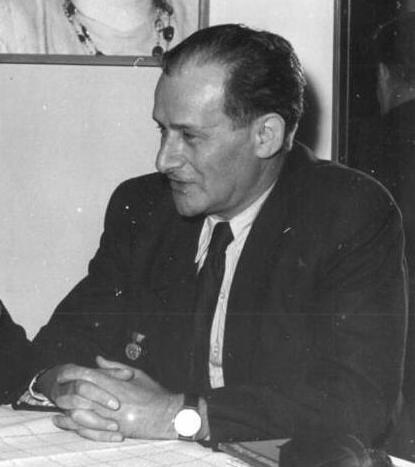
- Wolf in 1952
- Born: 23 December 1888; Neuwied, Rhine Province, German Empire
- Died: 5 October 1953 (aged 64); East Berlin, East Germany
- Occupations: Physician; Writer; Politician; Diplomat
- Political party: KPD (1926); SED (1950)
- Spouse(s): Kaethe Gumpold (1914); Else (Eva) Dreibholz (1922)
- Children: Johanna Marie (1915); Lukas (1919); Markus (1923–2006); Konrad (1925–1982) by Lotte Rayss; Lena by Irmgard Schaaf; Thomas Naumann (1953)
- Parent(s): Max and Ida Wolf

Friedrich Wolf (23 December 1888 – 5 October 1953) was a German doctor and politically engaged writer. From 1949 to 1951, he served as East Germany's first ambassador to Poland.

== Early life ==
Wolf was born in Neuwied, Rhine Province, the son of a Jewish merchant. From 1907 to 1912, he studied medicine, philosophy and art history in Munich, Tübingen, Bonn, and Berlin and became a doctor in 1913. In 1914, he worked first as a ship's doctor on the route between Canada, Greenland, and the United States, and in the same year became a field doctor on the Western Front during World War I, an experience that made him a strong opponent of war. In 1917, he published his first prose pieces.

== Career ==
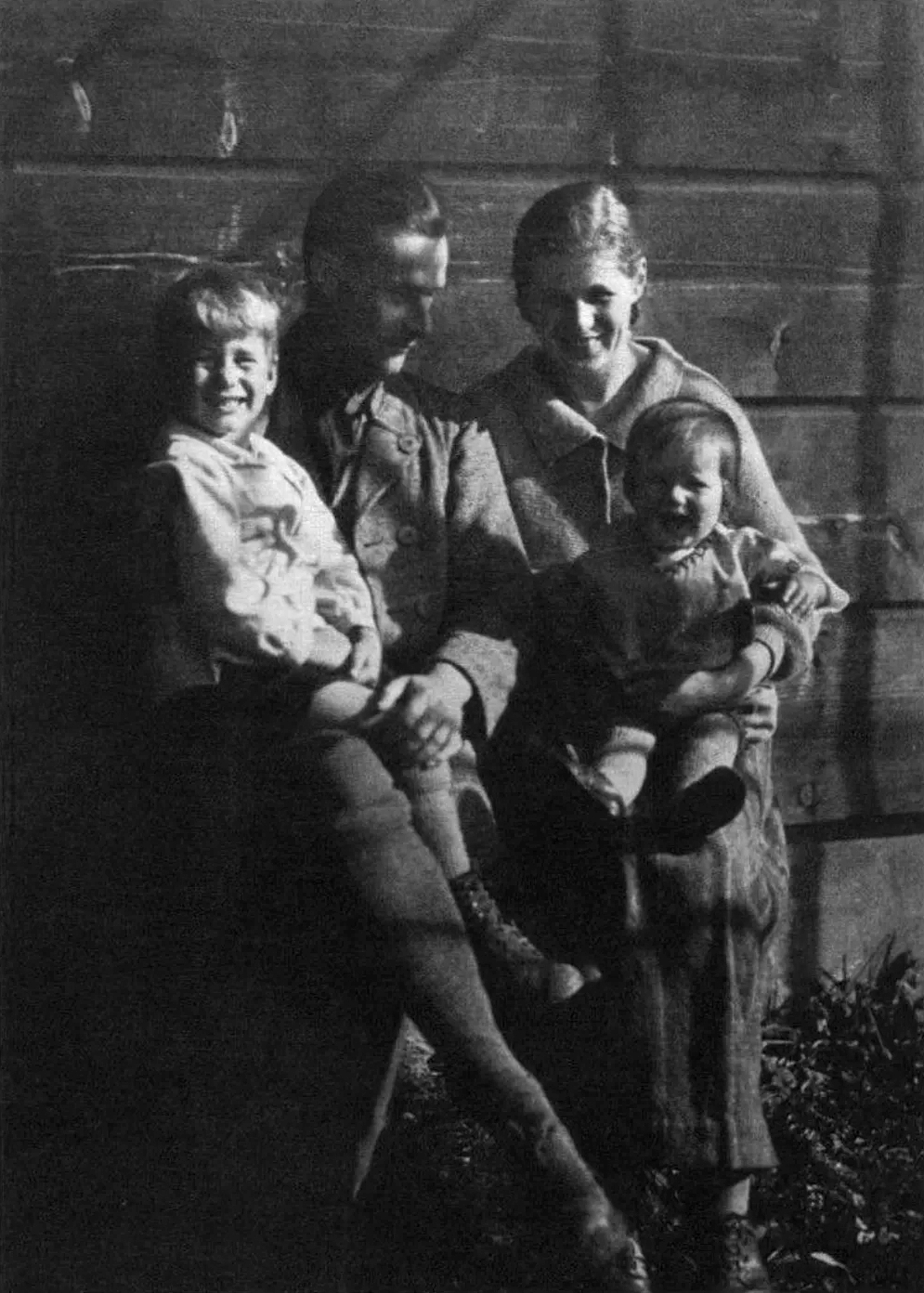
Wolf with his wife Else and their sons Markus (left) and Konrad (right), 1926

In 1918, Wolf became a member of the workers' council in Dresden and joined the Independent Social Democratic Party of Germany. After the war, he worked as a doctor in Remscheid and Hechingen, where he focused on care for common people and prescribed treatment using naturopathic medicine. In 1923 and 1925, his sons Markus and Konrad were born. After 1928, he became a member of the Communist Party of Germany and the Association of Proletarian-Revolutionary Authors. In 1929, his play "Cyankali" sparked a debate about abortion. He and Else Kienle were briefly arrested and charged in 1931 for performing abortions.

In early 1932, Wolf founded the Spieltrupp Südwest in Stuttgart, a communist agitprop group of lay actors that created controversial pieces about current topics. After the Nazis came to power, Wolf emigrated with his family to Moscow. In 1938 he made his way to Spain to work as a doctor in the International Brigades; however, he was arrested in France and interned in a concentration camp, Camp Vernet. In 1941, he gained Soviet citizenship and returned to Moscow, where he became a founder of the National Committee for a Free Germany (NKFD). In 1945, Wolf returned to Germany and was active in literary and cultural-political issues. From 1949 to 1951, he was the first ambassador of East Germany to Poland.

== Death ==
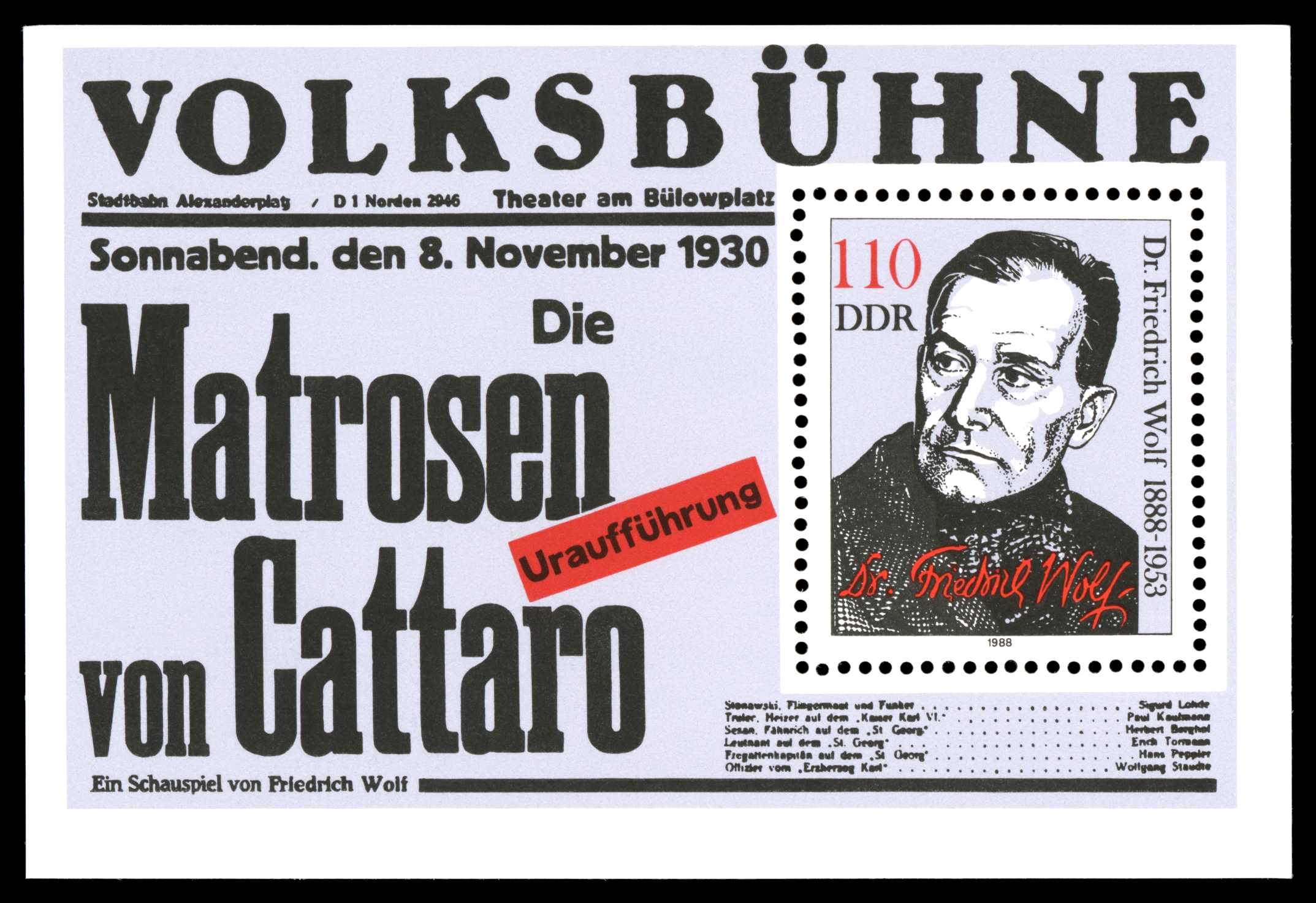
East Germany's stamp of Wolf, 1988

On 5 October 1953, he died in his personal office in East Berlin. He was cremated and honoured with burial at the Memorial to the Socialists (German: Gedenkstätte der Sozialisten) in the Friedrichsfelde Central Cemetery, Berlin. The Land Forces of the National People's Army named the 1st Motor Rifle Division's 1st Panzer Regiment in his honour, and in 1988, the Friedrich-Wolf-Medaille, a GDR national honour for health education, was named after him.

== Works ==
- Mohammed (1917, drama)
- "Langemarck" (1917, story)
- Das bist du (1919, drama)
- Der Unbedingte (1919, drama)
- Die Schwarze Sonne (1921, drama)
- Tamar (1922, drama)
- Die Schrankkomödie (1923, drama)
- Der arme Konrad (1923, drama)
- Das Heldenepos des alten Bundes (1924)
- Kreatur (1925, novel)
- Kolonne Hund (1926, drama)
- Äther (1926)
- Die Natur als Arzt und Helfer (1927)
- Koritke (1927, drama)
- "Der Kampf im Kohlenpott" (1927, novella)
- Cyankali (1929, drama)
- Die Matrosen von Cattaro (1930, drama)
- Tai Yang erwacht (1930, drama)
- Professor Mamlock (1933, drama)
- Floridsdorf (1934, drama)
- Das trojanische Pferd (1935, drama)
- Chin Up, Anna! (1935, short story)
- Zwei an der Grenze (1938, novel)
- Beaumarchais (1940, drama)
- "Der Russenpelz" (1942, novella)
- Heimkehr der Söhne (1944, novel)
- Dr. Lilli Wanner (1944, drama)
- Was der Mensch säet (1945, drama)
- Die letzte Probe (1946, drama)
- Märchen für große und kleine Kinder (1946)
- Wie Tiere des Waldes (1947, drama)
- The Council of the Gods (Der Rat der Götter) (1949, filmscript)
- Bürgermeister Anna (1949, comedy)
- Menetekel (1952, novel)
- Thomas Müntzer (1952, drama, film expose)

== Awards and decorations ==
- Order of the Red Star (1943)
- National Prize of East Germany
  - 2nd class for Professor Mamlock (1949)
  - 1st Class for The Council of the Gods (1950)

== Sources ==
- Hoffmann, Stefan Gotthelf: Der Rest ist Schweigen! Erdachte Gespräche mit Friedrich Wolf (1888–1953). Edition Schwarzdruck, Gransee 2013, ISBN 978-3-935194-63-1.
- Müller, Henning: Friedrich Wolf : 1888–1953. Deutscher Jude, Schriftsteller, Sozialist. (Jüdische Miniaturen; Bd. 78) Hentrich & Hentrich, Berlin 2009, ISBN 978-3-938485-90-3.
- Müller, Reinhard: Was ist ein Mensch? Aus der Moskauer Kaderakte Friedrich Wolfs. In: Einspruch. Schriftenreihe der Friedrich-Wolf-Gesellschaft. Exil in der Sowjetunion. Herausgegeben von Hermann Haarmann und Christoph Hesse. Marburg 2010, p. 23–52.
