= Tarō (given name) =

Tarō Asō
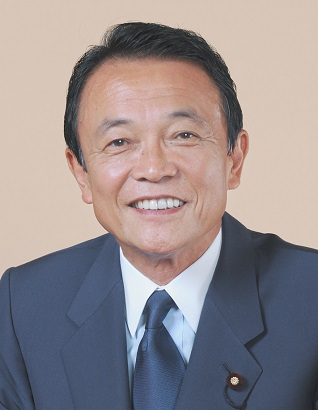
- Tarō Asō, former Prime Minister of Japan
- Pronunciation: [taꜜ.ɾoː]
- Gender: Male

Origin
- Origin: Japanese
- Meaning: Different meanings depending on the kanji used
- Region of origin: Japan

Other names
- Related names: Jiro; Saburo

Tarō (太郎) (alternatively romanized Taro, Tarô, Talo, Taroh or Tarou), is a stand-alone masculine Japanese given name or a common name second half of such a name (literally meaning "eldest son").

Tarō can also be used as a surname, but the etymology and kanji are different.

== Written forms ==
The name Tarō can have many different meanings depending on the kanji characters used to write it. It can also be written using hiragana or katakana. Possible variations of the name Taro include:

- 太郎, "strong, heroic, masculine"
- 多朗, "abundance, prolific, melodious"
- 立楼, "stand up, upright, watchtower"
- 汰滝, "selected waterfall"

== People with the given name ==
- Taro Achi (阿智 太郎, born 1980), Japanese light novelist and screenwriter
- Akebono Tarō (曙 太郎, 1969–2024), sumo wrestler from Hawaii
- Taro Ando (athlete) (安藤 太郎; born 1977), Japanese slalom canoeist
- Asashio Tarō IV ( 朝潮 太郎, born 1955), retired sumo wrestler from Muroto, Japan
- Taro Aso (麻生 太郎, born 1940), Japanese politician and the 92nd Prime Minister of Japan
- Taro Chiezo (千恵藏 太郎, born 1962), Manhattan based, Japanese artist
- Taro Daniel (ダニエル太郎, born 1993), professional Japanese tennis player
- Tarō Gomi (五味 太郎, born 1945), Japanese children's book illustrator and writer
- Taro Hakase (葉加瀬 太郎, born 1968), musician, violinist, and composer from Suita, Japan
- Taro Ichihara (市原 多朗; born 1950), Japanese opera singer
- Taro Ishida (石田 太郎, 1944–2013), a Japanese voice actor, and actor from Kyoto, Japan
- Taro Iwashiro (岩代 太郎, born 1965), a Japanese composer
- Taro Kagawa (賀川 太郎; 1922–1990), Japanese footballer
- Katsura Tarō (桂 太郎, 1848–1913), soldier and Prime Minister of Japan
- Tarō Kimura (journalist) (木村 太郎; born 1938), Japanese journalist
- Tarō Kimura (politician) (木村 太郎; 1965–2017), Japanese politician
- Taro Kono (河野 太郎, born 1963), a Japanese politician of the Liberal Democratic Party and a member of the House of Representatives
- Taro Kudo (工藤 太郎), a Japanese video game designer and video game music composer
- Tarō Okamoto (岡本 太郎, 1911–1996), a Japanese artist from Kawasaki Japan
- Taro Shoji (東海林 太郎, 1898–1972), a Japanese ryūkōka singer
- Taro Sugimoto (杉本 太郎; born 1996), Japanese footballer
- Taro Teshima (1912-??), Japanese rower
- Taro Urabe (卜部 太郎, born 1977), former Japanese football player
- Taro Yamaguchi (山口 太郎, born 1970), Japanese actor
- Taro Yamasaki (山崎 太郎, born 1945), Japanese American Pulitzer Prize-winning photographer and the eldest son of architect Minoru Yamasaki
- Tarō Yamamoto (山本 太郎, born 1974), Japanese politician and actor who is well known for portraying Shogo Kawada in Battle Royale
- Taro Yamamoto (artist) (1919-1994), Japanese American abstract expressionist artist who served in the U.S. Army during the Second World War
- Taro Yashima (八島 太郎, 1908-1994), pseudonym of a Japanese artist and expatriate in the United States
- Yoko Taro (横尾 太郎, born 1970), a Japanese video game director and scenario writer

== People with given names ending -tarō ==
- Jutarō
  - Komura Jutarō (小村 壽太郎, 1855–1911), Japanese politician and a statesman and diplomat in the Meiji Period
- Kantarō
  - Nakamura Kantarō II (二代目 中村 勘太郎, born 1981), the former stage name of Nakamura Kankuro VI(六代目 中村 勘九郎), Japanese kabuki, film, and television actor
  - Kantarō Suzuki (鈴木 貫太郎, 1868–1948), an admiral in the Imperial Japanese Army, and the former Prime Minister of Japan
- Kitarō (given name)
  - Kataro Shirayamadani (1865–1948), a Japanese ex-patriate ceramics painter who did most of his work in Cincinnati, Ohio, United States
- Kōtarō
  - Kotaro Koizumi (小泉 孝太郎, born 1978), Japanese actor and the eldest son of former Prime Minister Junichiro Koizumi
- Kyōtarō
  - Kyotaro Nishimura (西村 京太郎), Japanese mystery novelist
- Rentarō
  - Rentarō Mikuni (三國 連太郎, born 1923), Japanese film actor
  - Rentarō Taki (滝 廉太郎, 1879–1903), a Japanese composer, and pianist who is widely regarded as one of the best-known composers of Japan
- Ryōtarō
  - Ryōtarō Shiba (司馬 遼太郎, 1923–1996), Japanese historical novel author from Osaka
  - Ryōtarō Sugi (杉良太郎, born 1944), Japanese actor and singer from Kobe
- Ryūtarō
  - Ryutaro Hashimoto (橋本 龍太郎, 1937–2006), Japanese politician and the 83rd Prime Minister of Japan
- Sakutarō
  - Sakutarō Hagiwara (萩原 朔太郎, 1886–1942), Japanese poet and writer
- Shintarō
  - Shintaro Abe (安倍 晋太郎, 1924–1991), Japanese politician, and father of former Prime Minister, Shinzo Abe
  - Shintarō Ishihara (石原 慎太郎, born 1932), Japanese politician, author, and the Governor of Tokyo from 1999-2012
  - Shintaro Katsu (勝 新太郎, 1931–1997), Japanese actor, producer, director, and singer
- Shōtarō
  - Shōtarō Ikenami (池波 正太郎, 1923–1990), Japanese author who won the Naoki Award for popular literature in 1960
  - Shotaro Ishinomori (石ノ森 章太郎, 1938–1998), Japanese manga artist known for his works such as Cyborg 009 and Himitsu Sentai Gorenger
- Shuntarō
  - Shuntarō Tanikawa (谷川 俊太郎, born 1931), a Japanese poet and translator
- Tsurutarō
  - Tsurutarō Kataoka (片岡 鶴太郎, born 1954), a Japanese comedian, actor, artist, and professional boxer
- Umetarō
  - Umetaro Suzuki (鈴木 梅太郎, 1874–1943), Japanese scientist from the Shizuoka Prefecture of Japan
- Yatarō
  - Iwasaki Yatarō (岩崎 弥太郎, 1835–1885), Japanese businessman, financier, shipping industrialist, and founder of Mitsubishi
- Yoshitarō
  - Yoshitaro Nagata (永田 吉太郎; born 1929), Japanese boxer
  - Yoshitaro Nomura (野村 芳太郎; 1919–2005), Japanese film director, producer and screenwriter

== Characters ==
- Momotarō, the hero from a fairy tale
- Jōtarō Kūjō, the protagonist of JoJo's Bizarre Adventure: Stardust Crusaders
- Rantaro Amami, a character in Danganronpa V3: Killing Harmony
- Monotaro, one of the Monokubs in Danganronpa V3: Killing Harmony
- Kitarō, the titular protagonist of the GeGeGe no Kitarō manga series created by Shigeru Mizuki
- Kintarō, the hero from a fairy tale
- Urashima Tarō, the hero from a fairy tale
- Shippeitaro, the hero from a fairy tale
- Ultraman Taro, the sixth Ultra Brother
- Taro Soramame, a character in Dr. Slump media
- Taro Kagami of the pilot version of Death Note
- Taro Namatame, an antagonist of Persona 4
- Taro Kato, a character in Gorenger
- Taro, a character in Oobi
- Taro, a character in Disgaea 2: Cursed Memories
- Taro Nagazumi, the Japanese student in Mind Your Language, played by Robert Lee
- Hamtaro, Japanese hamster character.
- Ryoutarou Nogami, a character in Kamen Rider Den-O
- Gentaro Kisaragi, a character in Kamen Rider Fourze
- Taro Sato, a character in Kamen Rider Build
- Taro Yamada, character in Dokaben
- Taro Yamada, character in Yandere Simulator
- Gut Buster Taro, a character from Kamen Rider Zero-One
- Yumetaro, the protagonist of Gimmick!
- Jataro Kemuri, a character in Danganronpa Another Episode: Ultra Despair Girls
- Ryūtarō Naruhodō, an alias used by a character in The Great Ace Attorney 2: Resolve
- Ryotaro Dojima, a character in Persona 4
- Koops, known as "Nokotarō" in Japan, support character in Paper Mario: The Thousand-Year Door
- Sōtarō Ushigome/GaoBlack, a character of Hyakujuu Sentai Gaoranger.
- Kotarō Sakuma/Koguma SkyBlue, a character of Uchu Sentai Kyuranger.
- Tarō Momoi/Don Momotarō, a character and the leader of Avataro Sentai Donbrothers, based on Momotarō folklore.
- Kōtarō Minami, the main character of Kamen Rider BLACK and Kamen Rider BLACK RX
- Taro Sakamoto, the main character of Sakamoto Days
- Tenma Taro, a mythical being in Phoenix Wright: Ace Attorney – Dual Destinies

== See also ==
- Bandō Tarō, a nickname of Tone River
- Taro, a famed Sakhalin Husky of the 1958 Japanese Antarctica expedition
- Taro Tsujimoto, a fictitious Japanese ice hockey player selected in the 1974 NHL Draft
- Ikutaro Kakehashi, whose nickname was Taro
- Taro (disambiguation)
