= Jiro (given name) =

Jirō
- Gender: Male

Origin
- Origin: Japanese
- Meaning: It can have many different meanings depending on the kanji used.

Other names
- Related names: Taro; Saburo

Jirō or Jiro (じろう, ジロウ) is a stand-alone Japanese given name along with "Tarō", and a common name suffix for males.

== Written forms ==
Jirō can be written using different kanji characters and can mean:

- 次郎, "next, son"
- 次朗, "next, melodious"
- 二郎, "second, son"
- 二朗, "second, melodious"
- 治郎, "reign, son"

The name can also be written in hiragana or katakana.

== People ==
- Jiro (musician) (born 1972), bassist of the Japanese rock band GLAY
- Jiro Aichi (治郎, born 1969), Japanese politician
- Jirō Akagawa (次郎, born 1948), Japanese novelist
- Jiro Akama (二郎, born 1968), Japanese politician
- Jiro Ando (慈朗), Japanese manga artist
- Jirō Asada (次郎, born 1951), Japanese novelist
- Jiro Hirokawa (廣川 二郎), Japanese engineer
- Jiro Horikoshi (二郎, 1903–1982), chief engineer behind many Japanese fighters of WWII
- Jiro Hosotani (細谷 治朗; born 1950), Japanese weightlifter
- Jiro Kamiharako (次郎, born 1966), Japanese ski jumper
- Jiro Kikkawa (1929–2016), Japanese Australian ornithologist
- Jiro Manio (born 1992), Filipino actor
- Jiro Nakano (二郎, 1902–2000), Japanese composer
- Jiro Ogawa (小川 次郎; born 1939), Japanese ice hockey player
- Jiro Okabe (岡部 次郎; 1864–1925), Japanese politician
- Jiro Ono (born 1925), chef and owner of Sukiyabashi Jiro, a three-Michelin-starred restaurant
- Jiro Ono (politician) (born 1953), Japanese politician of Your Party
- Jiro Saito (voice actor) (斉藤 次郎), Japanese voice actor
- Jiro Saito (businessman) (斎藤 次郎; born 1936), Japanese businessman
- Jiro Wang (born 1981), Taiwanese actor and singer

== Characters ==
- Jiro (Blue Dragon) (ジーロ), a character in the Blue Dragon video game
- Jiro (Kamen Rider) (次狼) or Garulu (ガルル), a supporting character in the Kamen Rider Kiva tokusatsu series
- Jiro (Kikaider) (ジロー), the main protagonist in the Android Kikaider tokusatsu series
- Jiro Mochizuki, main protagonist in Black Blood Brothers
- Jirou Oriza, a character in Crush Gear Turbo
- Jiro Ueda (次郎), the main character in Trick TV series
- Jiro Shirogane, fantasy persona of Takashi "Shiro" Shirogane in Voltron: Legendary Defender
- Jiro Yamada (山田 二郎), the second child of the team called Buster Bros!!! from Hypnosis Mic: Division Rap Battle
- Jiro Yamashita (山下次郎), an idol from The Idolmaster SideM

== Other uses ==
- Jiro (ジロ), the famed Sakhalin Husky of the 1958 Japanese Antarctica expedition, depicted in the 1983 Japanese film Nankyoku Monogatari; see Taro and Jiro
- Erlang Shen 二郎神 Chinese god
