= 太郎 =

太郎, meaning "strong, heroic, masculine", is an Asian given name.

It may refer to:

- Chien Tai-lang (簡太郎; born 1947), Taiwanese politician
- Tarō, Japanese masculine given name

== See also ==
- Taro (disambiguation)
- 二郎 (disambiguation)
