= Long Tai Lang =

Long Tai Lang may refer to following Japanese individuals whose name can be transliterated to Kanji pronounced by Hanyu pinyin:

- Ryūtarō (隆太郎, 龍太郎, 龍太朗, 竜太郎), a masculine Japanese given name
- Ryōtarō (龍太郎, Lóngtàiláng), a masculine Japanese given name
