= Prime Minister Suzuki =

Prime Minister Suzuki (鈴木総理) may refer to one of the following Prime Ministers of Japan:

- Kantarō Suzuki (1868–1948), Japanese politician
- Zenkō Suzuki (1911–2004), Japanese politician

== See also ==
- Suzuki (disambiguation)
- Kantarō
- Zenkō
