= Umeji =

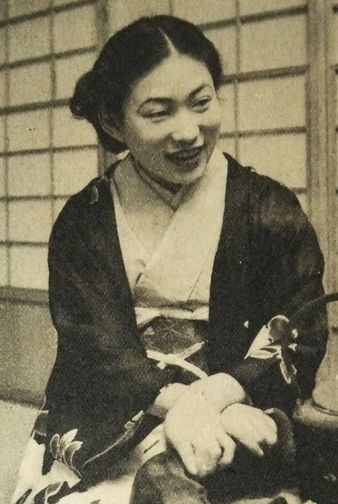
- Umeji Umemoto (1927-1968), Japanese dancer
- Pronunciation: ɯmedʑi (IPA)
- Gender: Unisex

Origin
- Origin: Japanese
- Meaning: Different meanings depending on the kanji used

Other names
- Alternative spelling: Umezi (Kunrei-shiki) Umezi (Nihon-shiki) Umeji (Hepburn)

Umeji is both a unisex Japanese given name and a Japanese surname.

== Written forms ==
Umeji can be written using different combinations of kanji characters. Here are some examples:

- 梅二, "plum, two"
- 梅次, "plum, next"
- 梅児, "plum, child"
- 梅治, "plum, to manage/cure"
- 梅路, "plum, route"
- 梅爾, "plum, you"

The name can also be written in hiragana うめじ or katakana ウメジ.

== Notable people with the given name Umeji ==
- Umeji Sasaki (佐々木 梅治; born 1945), Japanese actor and voice actor

== Notable people with the surname Umejii ==
- Kotaro Umeji, Japanese graphic designer
