= 二郎 =

二郎, meaning "second, son", may refer to:

- Erlang (disambiguation), Chinese transliterated title
  - Erlang, Susong County
  - Erlang, Taihe County
  - Erlang, Hechuan District
- Jiro (disambiguation), Japanese transliterated title
  - Jiro (given name)
- Niro (disambiguation), Japanese transliterated title
  - Nirō, a station in Hyōgo Prefecture, Japan

== See also ==
- The dictionary definition of 二 at Wiktionary
- The dictionary definition of 郎 at Wiktionary
- 太郎 (disambiguation)
