= Karafuto (disambiguation) =

Karafuto may refer to:

- Karafuto, the Japanese name of the island of Sakhalin
  - Karafuto Prefecture, the Japanese administrative division in southern Sakhalin from 1905 to 1945
- Karafuto-Ken, a breed of dog used as a sled dog
