= Hirokawa (surname) =

Hirokawa (written: 廣川 or 広川) is a Japanese surname. Notable people with the surname include:

- Jiro Hirokawa (廣川 二郎), Japanese engineer
- Nobutaka Hirokawa (廣川 信隆, born 1946), Japanese neuroscientist and cell biologist
- Taichirō Hirokawa (広川 太一郎, 1940–2008), Japanese voice actor
