= Kotaro =

- Gender: male

Origin
- Origin: Japanese
- Meaning: different meanings depending on the kanji used

Kotaro, Kōtarō or Koutarou (written: 耕太郎, 孝太郎, 康太郎, 光太郎, 功太郎, 浩太朗, 浩太郎, 幸太郎, 晃太郎, 興太郎, 洸太郎 or コータロー in katakana) is a masculine Japanese given name. Notable people with the name include:

- Kotaro Azuse (東瀬 耕太郎; born 1967), Japanese baseball player
- Kotaro Honda (本多 光太郎; 1870–1954), Japanese scientist and inventor
- Kōtarō Iizawa (飯沢 耕太郎; born 1954), Japanese photography critic and writer
- Kotaro Ikeda (池田 幸太郎; 1895–1976), Japanese painter
- Kōtarō Isaka (伊坂 幸太郎; born 1971), Japanese writer
- Kōtarō Kodama (児玉更太郎; 1934–2026), Japanese politician
- Kotaro Koizumi (小泉 孝太郎; born 1978), Japanese actor
- Kotaro Nagasaki (長崎 幸太郎; born 1968), Japanese politician
- Kōtarō Nakagawa (中川 幸太郎; born 1969), Japanese composer and music arranger
- Kōtarō Nakamura (中村 孝太郎; 1881–1947), Japanese general
- Koutaro Nishiyama (西山 宏太朗; born 1991), Japanese voice actor and singer
- Kotaro Omori (大森 晃太郎; born 1992), Japanese footballer
- Kotaro Oshio (押尾 コータロー; born 1968), Japanese guitarist
- Kotaro Otake (大竹 耕太郎; born 1995), Japanese baseball player
- Kotaro Sakurai (桜井 孝太郎; born 1994), Japanese racing driver
- Kōtarō Satomi (里見 浩太朗; born 1936), Japanese actor
- Kotaro Shimizu (清水 孝太郎; born 1911), Japanese hurdler
- Kotaro Shimomura (下村 孝太郎; 1861–1937), Japanese chemical engineer
- Kotaro Suzumura (鈴村 興太郎; 1944–2020), Japanese economist and academic
- Kōtarō Takamura (高村 光太郎; 1883–1956), Japanese poet and sculptor
- Kotaro Tamura (田村 耕太郎; born 1963), Japanese politician
- Kōtarō Tanaka (judge) (田中 耕太郎; 1890–1974), Japanese jurist and politician
- Kōtarō Tanaka (photographer) (田中 幸太郎; 1901–1995), Japanese photographer
- Kotaro Uchikoshi (打越 鋼太郎; born 1973), Japanese video game director and scenario writer
- Kotaro Umeji, Japanese graphic designer
- Kotaro Yamazaki (山崎 光太郎; born 1978), Japanese footballer
- Kotaro Yanagi (柳 浩太郎; born 1985), Japanese actor
- Kotaro Yatabe (谷田部 洸太郎; born 1986), Japanese rugby union player
- Kōtarō Yoshida (吉田 幸太郎; 1883–1966), Japanese jujutsuka

Kotarō or Kotarou (written: 小太郎, 鼓太郎 or 虎太郎) is a separate given name, though it may be romanized the same way. Notable people with the name include:

- Fūma Kotarō (風魔 小太郎; died 1603), Japanese ninja
- Kotaro Suzuki (鈴木 鼓太郎; born 1978), Japanese professional wrestler
- Kotaro Tachikawa (立川 小太郎; born 1997), Japanese footballer
- Kotaro Togashi (富樫 虎太郎; born 2011), Japanese motorcycle racer

== Fictional characters ==
- Kotarou Higuchi (樋口 湖太郎), protagonist of the manga series Pita-Ten
- Kotarou Kashima (鹿島 虎太郎), a character from the manga and anime School Babysitters, younger brother of Ryuichi Kashima
- Kōtarō Bokuto (木兎 光太郎), a character in the manga series Haikyu!!
- Kotaro Tatsumi (巽 幸太郎), a character in the anime series Zombie Land Saga
- Kotaro (仔太郎), a character in the 2007 anime samurai film Sword of the Stranger
- Kotaro Minami (南 光太郎), the protagonist of the tokusatsu series Kamen Rider Black
- Satō Kotarō (さとう コタロー), the titular character of the manga and anime series Kotaro Lives Alone
- Kotaro Katsura (桂 小太郎), a character in the manga series Gintama
- Kotaro Higashi (東 光太郎), the protagonist of the 1973 tokusatsu series Ultraman Taro

'

== See also ==
- Kōtarō Makaritōru!, a Japanese manga series
