= Hime =

Japanese word for "princess"

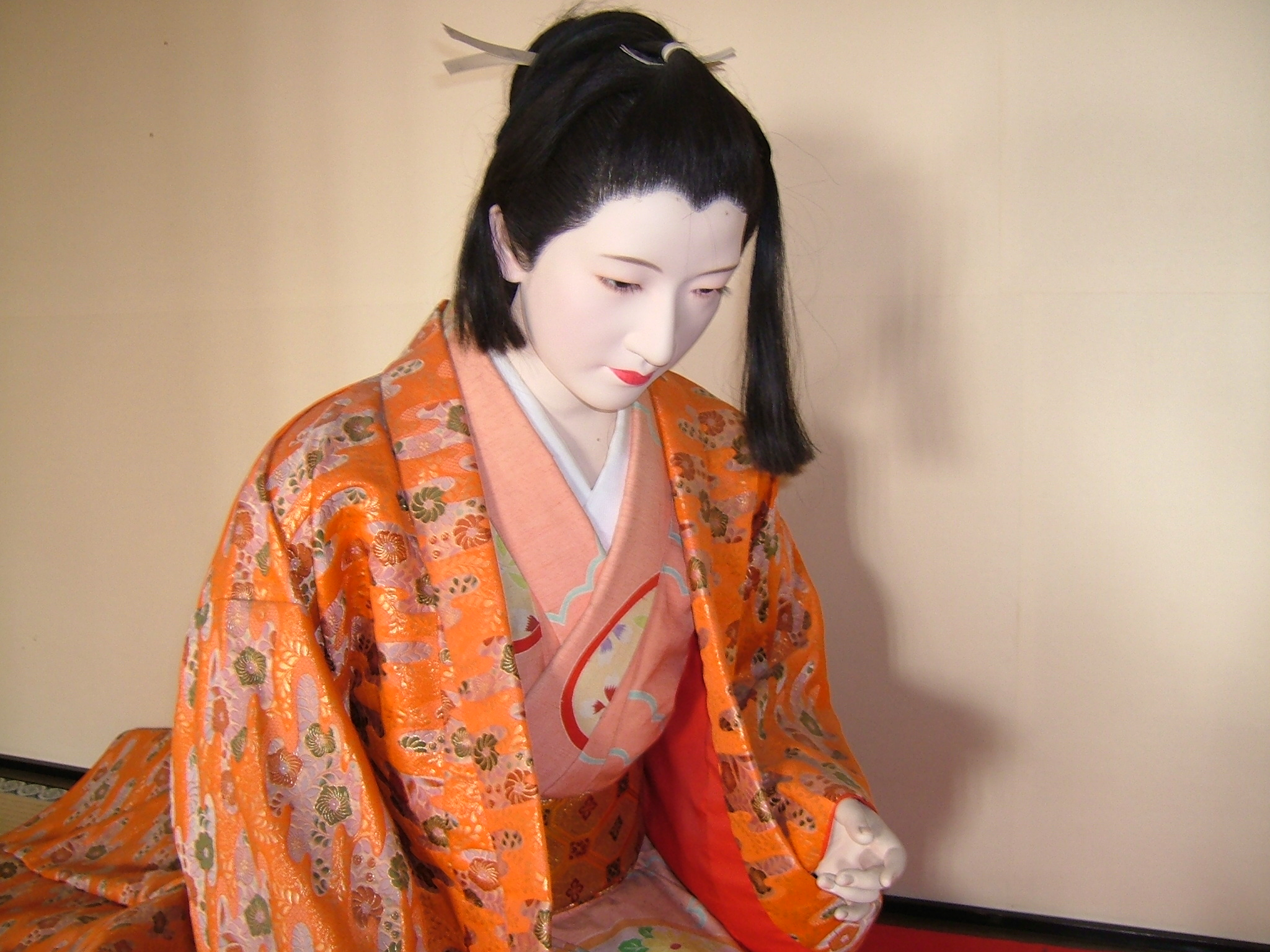
Life-size display doll of Sen-hime (千姫), the eldest daughter of Tokugawa Hidetada

Hime (姫) is the Japanese word for princess or a lady of higher birth. Daughters of a foreign monarch are actually referred to by other terms, e.g. Ōjo (王女), literally king's daughter, even though Hime can be used to address Ōjo. As for the female relatives of the Japanese monarch, the following terms are used (depending on relation); Naishinnō (内親王; Imperial Princess) used for the daughters and granddaughters of an emperor. Joō (女王 (Note: Literally meaning "Queen".); Princess) used for third-generation descendents of an emperor and beyond. Shinnōhi (親王妃; Imperial Princess Consort (Note: Coming from the word "Shinnō" which is the title of an Imperial Prince, and the word "Hi" of which the character (妃) denotes a consort. May also be translated as "Consort to the/an Imperial Prince".)) used for the wife of a Shinnō (親王; Imperial Prince, which is the son or grandson of the monarch). Ōhi (王妃; Princess Consort (Note: Coming from the word "Ō" (王) which literally means king but is translated as Prince in relation to a male member of the Imperial family, and the word "Hi" of which the character (妃) denotes a consort. May also be translated as "Consort to the Prince".)) used for the wife of an Ō (王; Prince, which is the third-generation descendents of an emepror and beyond).

The word Hime initially referred to any beautiful female person. The antonym of Hime is Shikome (醜女), literally ugly female, though it is archaic and rarely used. Hime may also indicate feminine or simply small when used together with other words, such as Hime-gaki (a low line of hedge).

Hime is commonly seen as part of a Japanese female divinity's name, such as Toyotama-hime. The Kanji applied to transliterate Hime are 比売 or 毘売 rather than 姫. The masculine counterpart of Hime is Hiko (彦, 比古 or 毘古,) which is seen as part of Japanese male gods' names, such as Saruta-hiko. Unlike Hime, Hiko is neutral, non-archaic and still commonly used as a modern Japanese male given name, for example Nobuhiko Takada.

== Etymology ==
Originally a compound of sun (日, hi) and woman (女, me).

The kanji 姫 is from Chinese 姬 jī (Old Chinese *klɯ), "lady," derived from Ji, the surname of the Zhou. The character is formed as a phono-semantic compound, combining 女 ("woman") with the phonetic 𦣞 (in Old Chinese pronounced *lɯ).

== Proverb ==
- Ichi hime ni taro "First baby, a girl. Second baby, a boy": It originally meant that having a girl first, and a boy second was easier on the mother as she gained experience before nurturing a boy. However, with each household having fewer children, this is commonly confused as having "one girl and two boys", or three children. This is because "ichi" means "one" in Japanese and "ni" means "two" in Japanese, and therefore could be read as, "One girl, two boys."

== Usage ==
While many use the name Hime to address those of a higher or more noble birth, there are a few who use it as a girl's name. Thus some names either incorporate the word Hime or the giver simply will name said girl Hime.

== Historical ==
- Himiko Some believe that Himiko is a transliteration from Japanese to Chinese of Himemiko or female shaman.
- Soga no Kitashihime (consort of Emperor Kinmei)

=== Heian and Kamakura Period ===
• Yaehime (daughter of Ito Sukechika, first wife of Minamoto no Yoritomo)

• Ohime (daughter of Minamoto no Yoritomo)

• Bomon Nobuko/Bomonhime (daughter of Bomon Nobukiyo, wife of Minamoto no Sanetomo)

=== Sengoku Period ===
- Nōhime (daughter of Saito Dosan, wife of Oda Nobunaga)
- Ichi Hime (市姫) (younger sister of Oda Nobunaga, wife of Azai Nagamasa, wife of Shibata Katsuie)
- Koma Hime (駒姫) (daughter of Mogami Yoshiaki)
- Gotoku Hime (五徳姫) (daughter of Oda Nobunaga, wife of Matsudaira Nobuyasu)
- Iroha Hime (五郎八姫) (daughter of Date Masamune)
- Toku Hime （督姫） (second daughter of Tokugawa Ieyasu)
- Hosokawa Gracia (daughter of Akechi Mitsuhide, wife of Hosokawa Tadaoki)
- Senhime (eldest daughter Shogun Tokugawa Hidetada, wife of Toyotomi Hideyori)
- Komatsuhime (daughter of Honda Tadakatsu, wife of Sanada Nobuyuki)
- Yodo-dono/Chachahime (daughter of Ichi Hime (市姫), concubine of Toyotomi Hideyoshi)
- Hatsu Hime (初姫) (daughter of Ichi Hime (市姫))
- Oeyo (daughter of Ichi Hime (市姫), wife of Tokugawa Hidetada)
- Tachibana Ginchiyo (daughter of Tachibana Dōsetsu, wife of Tachibana Muneshige)
- Mah Hime (摩阿姫) (daughter of Maeda Toshiie, concubine of Toyotomi Hideyoshi)
- Go hime (豪姫)/Maria (daughter of Maeda Toshiie, wife of Ukita Hideie)
- Kaihime (daughter of Narita Ujinaga, concubine of Toyotomi Hideyoshi)
- Chikurin'in/Akihime (daughter of Otani Yoshitsugu, wife of Sanada Yukimura)
- Suwa Goryonin (諏訪御料人) (daughter of Suwa Yorishige, concubine of Takeda Shingen)

=== Literature ===
- Kaguya-hime; or The Moon Princess; The Tale of the Bamboo Cutter folk tale
- Tsubaki-hime (椿姫, a common Japanese translation of the French work The Lady of the Camellias)

=== In popular culture ===
- Shikabane Hime is a Japanese manga series and a TV anime series
- Anmitsu Hime (The Sugar Princess, anime and manga series)
- Mononoke Hime (Princess Mononoke, film)
- Hime, the lead character in the anime and manga series Princess Resurrection.
- Sakura Hime Kaden, a manga by Arina Tanemura
- Fushigiboshi no Futagohime, a Japanese anime
- Tsunade-hime, a character from Naruto, a manga and anime.
- Orihime Inoue, a character from Bleach, a manga and anime.
- Yashahime: Princess Half-Demon, the sequel to the manga and anime series Inuyasha.
- Utahime Iori, a supporting character in the Manga and Anime Jujutsu Kaisen.
- Luna Himemori, a Hololive VTuber
- Kuragehime, (Princess Jellyfish), is a Japanese manga series, TV anime series, and live action series.
- Hime Houzuki (Pearl Houzuki), the Japanese name of a character from the video game series Splatoon
- Crunchyroll-Hime, the mascot of Crunchyroll LLC

=== Castle ===
- Himeji Castle

== See also ==
- Tennō
- Josei Tennō
