= Nankyoku Tairiku =

2011 Japanese television series

- DVD cover
- Written by: Yoshihiro Izumi
- Directed by: Kazuo Fukuzawa
- Starring: Takuya Kimura; Haruka Ayase; Masato Sakai; Yusuke Yamamoto; Kyōhei Shibata; Tsunehiko Watase; Susumu Terajima; Naoto Ogata; Teruyuki Kagawa
- Narrated by: Tomoko Naraoka
- Theme music composer: Miyuki Nakajima
- Ending theme: "From the Icy Reaches" by Miyuki Nakajima
- Composers: Yū Takami; Kei Yoshikawa
- Country of origin: Japan
- Original language: Japanese
- No. of seasons: 1
- No. of episodes: 10

Production
- Producers: Akihiko Ishimaru; Hideyori Iyoda; Yasuhiro Yamada
- Running time: 54–125 minutes
- Production company: TBS

Original release
- Network: TBS
- Release: October 16 – December 18, 2011

Nankyoku Tairiku (南極大陸) is a 2011 Japanese television drama series that premiered on TBS on October 16, 2011. It is a remake of the 1983 film Antarctica. The show was released on Netflix as Antarctica in 2024.

== List of episodes ==
1. "A Touching Story of Love and Life for the Revival of Post-War Japan/ A Miracle Between Dogs and Mankind that occurred 56 Years Ago, the Story Begins to Rotate"

During the era in Japan known as the Shōwa era or post-war, the people of Japan were struggling to recover from the destruction of World War II. Determined to prove to the rest of the world that Japan will not be shunned from the rest of the world, the Japanese government decided to launch an expedition and set up a research base on the mysterious continent that few men dared to have the courage and skills to explore – the frozen continent of Antarctica. An old Japanese war vessel called the Sōya, which had survived the war was repaired and redesigned as the first Icebreaker ship for the Japanese Antarctic Expedition, and fifty-three men were chosen for the journey to the continent.

Kuramochi, a mountaineer who lost his wife during the war, and Inuzuka, a young outcast who has little experience of many tasks, were given the task of choosing and handling the team of Japanese sled dogs that was to go with the expedition team to Antarctica. With the help of an elderly professor, his daughter, her two young children, and several dog owners, they succeeded in gathering a total of twenty-two Sakhalin Huskies for the Antarctic Expedition, including the woman's children's dog Riki, who had once been the leader of a dog team, and two brother dogs Taro and Jiro that Kuramochi easily tamed. The two men train and run the dogs a number of times before they were finally ready for the upcoming journey.

After several months of agonizing work, the icebreaker Sōya was finally finished and the crew were ready to leave for Antarctica. On November 8, 1956, the Sōya, carrying her team of fifty-three Japanese crew members and 22 sled dogs disembarked from the docks of Japan and headed south for the continent of Antarctica.

2. "Arrival! Antarctica"

The Sōya sailed south from Japan for the frozen continent of Antarctica, only to run into difficult obstacles along the way. Though Kuramochi, Inuzuka, and nine other members of the crew who were desperate to prove themselves desired to winter in Antarctica as the First Cross-Winter Antarctic Expedition team, the leader of the crew Shirosaki Suguru disapproved of the suggestions, stating that the first expedition team should set up the base on the mainland of Antarctica and that only the Second Cross-Winter Antarctic Expedition should winter in. Several of the men ended up fighting amongst each other for reasons they either are trying to forget or refuse to bring up in public. To make matters worse, a series of violent hurricanes battered the Icebreaker vessel, inflicting damage on both the crew members and the ship. During one storm, one of the dogs Anko was badly injured, but he slowly recovered after a few days' rest. A second storm resulted in the flooding of several rooms in the ship and several crew members badly injured. The brother dogs, Taro and Jiro got loose, but soon were found and rescued by Kuramochi, Inuzuka, and a few other crew members.

Finally, after several months of stressful sailing, the icebreaker Sōya arrived at the coast of Antarctica. After a brief discussion with the government and also with the ship's crew, Shirosaki finally decided that after setting up the Japanese base, the First Cross-Winter Antarctic Expedition will be permitted to winter in Antarctica. Eleven members of the crew were chosen for the expedition team, including Kuramochi, Inuzuka, and Himuro Haruhiko, a member of the Financial Ministries of Japan.

3. "Our Miracle Dogs"

After arriving at Antarctica, the Japanese team decide to set up their base on the island of East Ongul. The team members spend the next few weeks building the new Showa Station, but during that time, several tragic events apparently slowed things down and left the men frustrated and stressed. A heavy blizzard forced the team to remain in the Sōya for several days, resulting in the destruction of the half-finished buildings. Chunks of ice break apart, carrying some of the fuel and food supplies for the winter team out to sea. To make matters worse, one of the sled dogs, Kuma from Furen (father of Taro and Jiro) unexpectedly attacks the lead dog Riki and overpowers him, forcing him to lose his spirit of running the entire dog team. A few days later, three of the sled dogs (Moku, Tomu, and Mime) end up suffering serious injuries and are forced to return to Japan with the rest of the Sōya crew.

With the dog team unable to pull the sled without a leader, Kuramochi and the other crew members fear that their expedition will be a complete disaster. However, on a dark blizzard night, when Kuramochi and Inuzuka try to get the sled going, Kuma from Furen again attacks one of the other dogs. But before the men could lose another one of their sled dogs, Riki unexpectedly gathers his courage and attacks Kuma, defeating the black dog in a quick fight and gaining back his pride of leadership.

With the team finally able to pull the sled under Riki's regained leadership, the dogs were able to help their handlers rescue three members of the expedition team who were stranded in the middle of the blizzard after their snowcat shut down.

4. "Farewell, Our Beloved Friend"

The Showa Station was finally completed and the Sōya set sail for Japan, leaving behind a team of eleven Japanese scientists and nineteen Sakhalin huskies to winter in Antarctica for a year. Though the team members were excited about wintering in for a year and were more than willing to accept any challenges before them, they were forced to confront several major problems of their own. On the first day of their stay at the base, the men discovered that some of the ice near the base had broken apart and carried off half of their fuel and food supplies for the year. To fix this situation, the men started ice-fishing and began catching a good number of gobies to replenish their shrunken food supply. They also decided to rely most of their transportation work on the dogs to save their remaining fuel.

Things went from bad to worse when Bekku, one of the sled dogs suffered from a kidney disease and died a few days later. A few weeks afterwards, Inuzuka accidentally set the radio contact building on fire and was unable to put it out with the fire extinguisher because he had turned it on to test it. At first, the crew scolded and belittled Inuzuka for his carelessness, but after a day or so, the men encouraged him to try to make up for his mishaps and forgave him for what had happened. To make up for his mistakes, Inuzuka decided to accompany Kuramochi and Himuro on their most difficult challenge yet; to journey across the Antarctic wilderness and climb to the top of Botnnuten.

5. "Death of a Comrade"

Kuramochi, joined by Himuro and Inuzuka, began his journey to fulfill the team's mission of climbing to the top of Mt. Botnnuten. Back home in Japan, Shirasaki Suguru was busy preparing for the second Antarctica expedition to replace the 11 members from the first expedition that were left to do preliminary studies. Despite the heavy blizzard and going off track from their plan route, Kuramochi and his companions were very glad and surprised that they managed to reach their destination. Kuramochi and Himuro climbed and reached the peak of Botnnuten where Kuramochi fixed a plaque with inscriptions of the achievement made in the name of the First Japanese Antarctica Expedition team, as well as his father's Antarctic expedition team photo. A heavy blizzard descended again on their return journey back to the base, and during the return journey, one of the sled dogs Tetsu broke loose and ran off. Making matters worse, the snow-covered ground over which the team was travelling collapsed beneath them, in which Himuro fell down and broke his leg. They managed to take shelter at the frozen whale carcass they found earlier near the foot of Mt. Botnnuten.

Shortly after seeking shelter in the whale carcass during the blizzard, Kuramochi was reunited with Tetsu who had followed them to their camp. With their food rations running out and the icy conditions taking their toll on him and his companions, Kuramochi comes up with a plan. Turning loose the lead dog Riki, as well as the brothers Taro and Jiro, Kuramochi sent the three dogs with a message to get help from their comrades at the base. Shortly after the dogs left to get help, Kuramochi, Himuro, and Inuzuka succumb to the bitter cold and lose consciousness.

6. "What Really Happened 54 Years Ago"

As the blizzard finally let up, Utsumi and Samejima took the snowcat to search for the missing explorers. While searching for Kuramochi and his party, the two team members were met by Riki, Taro, and Jiro carrying the message that Kuramochi wrote to the other team members. Utsumi and Samejima followed the three dogs back to the whale carcass, where they were reunited with the three missing explorers and the rest of the dogs. Kuramochi and Inuzuka praised Riki, Taro, and Jiro for saving their lives, and even Himuro embraced Riki in gratitude for the dogs' heroism. Some time after returning to Showa Base, Kuramochi and all ten members of the expedition team were overjoyed upon receiving news of the coming of the second expedition team.

Despite their joyous reunion, the expedition team ended up losing two more sled dogs. Kuma from Pippu broke his chain, ran off into the Antarctic wilderness, and disappeared, while Tetsu died at the base of natural causes. Shiroko, the sole female dog of the team, soon gave birth to a litter of eight puppies, bringing the number of dogs at the base up to 24 sled dogs. As the ship, Sōya, carrying the second Antarctica expedition team approached, it became entrapped by pack ice due to the changing weather conditions and the ship's lack of power. Shirasaki, going against Iwaki's instructions under the government's orders, was able to get the assistance from the US icebreaker USS Burton Island to break through the ice. With time constraints and the worsening weather conditions, the expedition team was forced to be quickly evacuated from the base back to the icebreaker Sōya. The 24 Sakhalin huskies, including Shiroko and her puppies, were left behind at the Showa station.

7. "The Conclusion with the Sakhalin Huskies"

Shortly after being evacuated from the base, Kuramochi and his team members were informed by the crew of the icebreaker Sōya that they would return to the base to pick up the dogs. They managed to however make one trip back to the base and pick Shiroko and her eight puppies, as well as leave a small supply of food for the remaining fifteen dogs who were still chained outside the base. Following behind the USS Burton Island icebreaker, Sōya managed to get out to open sea once again.

As a result of miscalculations however, the ship did not have enough reserve fuel in its tanks to send in the second expedition team or bring back the fifteen Sakhalin huskies left behind at the station. The worsening weather conditions prevented even air rescue of the huskies. Himuro and Kuramochi both angrily and desperately begged Shirasaki and the icebreaker crew to go back for the dogs, reminding them that they had saved their lives during the expedition to Mt. Botnutten, but Shirasaki tearfully told them that Sōya no longer had the power to help the dogs anymore. With the harsh weather conditions, badly damaged parts on the ship, and a shortage of fuel, the crew had no choice but to abandon the huskies at the base.

Devastated and betrayed, Kuramochi stormed out onto the deck of the icebreaker and looked out into the direction of the base which lay many miles away. With a heavy heart, he began screaming out the names of the dogs and cried out that he was sorry for failing to bring them back home. Meanwhile, at the base, the huskies had eaten the last of the food left for them and began struggling to break loose from their chains. As Sōya sailed away from the continent bound for Japan, Riki and three other dogs (Deri, Anko, and Jiro) managed to loosen their collars and break free. Back in Japan, news of the huskies being abandoned brought condemnation from the public. The government also began deliberating on cancelling the third Antarctic expedition.

8. "Our Heroes Have No Glory"

All eleven members of the First Japanese Cross-Winter Antarctic Expedition team reached back safely to Japan. Most of them went back to their respective jobs before embarking on the Antarctica expedition. Kuramochi quit his university job and went on a mission to Hokkaido to meet with the owners of the abandoned Sakhalin huskies to share with them about the contributions made by their dogs in the expedition. Most refused to talk to him and bitterly accused him of abandoning their dogs on the continent to die. Initially, the Furutachi kids who owned Riki also refused to talk to him, but later on they responded and forgave him after learning that Riki had saved his life during the Botnutten expedition. In the meantime, Shirasaki took it upon himself to persuade the government to proceed with the organizing of a Third Japanese Antarctica Expedition. Kuramochi, seeing this as an opportunity to return to Antarctica and bring back the stranded sled dogs, was determined to join the third expedition team.

Meanwhile, back in Antarctica, Riki, Deri, Anko, and Jiro returned to the base to check on their chained companions. Four more dogs also broke loose from their chains (Taro, Shiro, Jakku, and Kuma from Furen), but the remaining seven dogs were unable to get loose. Within several days, the seven chained dogs (Goro, Moku, Aka, Kuro, Pochi, Pesu, and Kuma from Monbetsu) succumbed to hunger, bitter cold, and raw wounds around their necks from chafing at their tightened collars and died. The eight freed dogs left the base and headed into the frozen wilderness of Antarctica to hunt for food. They soon turned to hunting for seals, penguins, and skuas for food, seeking shelter at night and during the harsh blizzards that hit the continent, and facing ongoing challenges that they never faced on their own before.

9. "The Curtain Falls...A Miracle Happens"

Six months had already passed since the fifteen Sakhalin huskies had been stranded at the Showa research station in Antarctica. At that point, seven of the dogs had died on their chains, while three of the eight dogs that freed themselves (Deri, Shiro, and Jakku) had died or disappeared in the wilderness. Only five dogs were left alive (Riki, Kuma from Furen, Taro, Jiro, and Anko) as they continued to survive the harsh winter conditions in Antarctica. Though the five dogs continued to survive in the harsh conditions of the brutal Antarctic winter and the coming of spring, hunting for food became difficult for them on the ice shelves. They were soon forced to eat their feces, eat the excrement of seals, and even dig on the surface of the ice for gobies that had been frozen into the sea ice. Riki, Taro, and Jiro become devastated when Anko runs off into the darkness one spring night and disappears, while Kuma from Furen drifts out to sea on a small ice floe.

Back in Japan, the government decided to proceed with the Third Japanese Antarctica Expedition on the condition that no members of the first and second expedition teams were to be involved except Shirasaki. Shirasaki, with Kuramochi in mind, started out on a quest to persuade the government to allow another member from the First Cross-Winter Antarctic Expedition team. Finally, after several months of being pressured by Shirasaki, Kuramochi, and much of the populace of Japan, everything was settled and Kuramochi was allowed to join the third expedition. The Third Japanese Antarctic Expedition was launched with as much grandeur as the first, bound for Antarctica with the hopes of rescuing the sled dogs stranded at the Showa Base.

10. "The Curtain Falls〜Transcending Time and Space...The Beginning of the True Miracle 52 Years Ago Concludes!!"

After more than ten months since they were first abandoned by the First Japanese Antarctic Expedition, only three of the fifteen sled dogs were left alive (Riki, Taro, and Jiro). However, during their return journey to Showa Base, a severely weakened Riki collapsed on the ice and Taro and Jiro ran off into the wilderness to find food for their weakened leader. However, a severe snowstorm separates the three dogs and Riki used what was left of his strength to continue his return journey to the research station. Upon arriving on the outskirts of Showa Base, Riki collapsed on a small hill nearby and thought back to the good memories he had with the Furutachi children, Kuramochi, and the other sled dogs as he lay dying.

Meanwhile, during the Third Japanese Antarctic Expedition, before the disembarkation of the team members and unloading of the equipment, Kuramochi was flown out by helicopter to check out the situation of the research station and the abandoned huskies. He found the corpses of seven huskies still chained at the base, but was greatly relieved to discover that eight of the dogs had managed to get loose from their chains. Later that afternoon, Kuramochi discovered the body of Riki covered in snow on the slope of a hill approaching the station. Even though he was surprised to discover that Riki's body was still warm, indicating that Riki had died just a short while before he was found, Kuramochi was devastated and heartbroken at the loss of one of the dogs that saved his life and that he had failed in his promise to bring Riki back alive. News of his discovery reached the people of Japan, including the owners of the eight deceased dogs, who were shocked and grief-stricken upon hearing of the demises of their beloved dogs.

The next day after arriving at the base, Kuramochi was preparing to bury his eight comrades when he noticed a dog standing on the summit of a hill many yards away from the base. Kuramochi thought at first that it was Kuma from Furen, but as the dog began moving and was followed closely by a second dog, he discovered that it was actually Taro and Jiro, both of whom had survived more than eleven months in Antarctica. Overjoyed to see his two dogs alive, Kuramochi called out to Taro and Jiro, to which the two dogs began bounding across the snow towards him. At first, Taro and Jiro didn't recognize Kuramochi, but after sniffing one of his gloves, they quickly recognize him and are reunited with the man who loved them both dearly. Kuramochi delivered this wonderful news to Shirasaki, who informed the people of Japan of Taro and Jiro's survival. He gave the deceased huskies an honorable send off linked via radio communication to the crew members aboard the icebreaker Sōya and the people of Japan. One by one, Kuramochi says goodbye to the eight dogs, promising each of them that he would see them again, especially to Riki whom he, Taro, and Jiro all express their final farewells of love and sorrow for the beloved leader of the sled dogs.

In 1961, Kuramochi, along with the dogs Taro and Jiro and the members of the Third Japanese Cross-Winter Antarctica Expedition team returned to a grand welcome from the people of Japan. Fifty years later, an elderly Kuramochi returned to Antarctica to visit the burial place of the sled dogs he had left behind in Japan, remembering the good times he had had with each of them.

== Cast ==
- Takuya Kimura – Takeshi Kuramochi
- Kyōhei Shibata (special appearance) – Suguru Shirasaki
- Teruyuki Kagawa – Eitaro Hoshino
- Masato Sakai – Haruhiko Himuro
- Naoto Ogata – Noriaki Utsumi
- Yusuke Yamamoto – Natsuo Inuzuka
- Susumu Terajima – Naohito Samejima
- Hisashi Yoshizawa – Shinkichi Yokomine
- Yoshinori Okada – Ikuzo Funaki
- Yōsuke Kawamura – Hajime Arashiyama
- Ishimoto Doronzu – Manpei Yamazato
- Kōtarō Shiga – Kennosuke Tani
- Haruka Ayase – Miyuki Takaoka
- Yukie Nakama – Yukari Kuramochi (eps. 1, 5)
- Tsunehiko Watase – Kuramochi's father (eps. 1–2, 4–5)
- Gaku Yamamoto – Tomohiro Furutachi (eps. 1, 7–10)
- Tae Kimura – Ayako Furutachi (eps. 1, 6–10)
- Mana Ashida – Haruka Furutachi (eps. 1, 6–10)
- Mizuki Inoue – Ryo Furutachi (eps. 1, 6–10)
- Ito Ōno – Mitsuko Inuzuka (eps. 1, 4, 8)
- Takako Katou – Junko Samejima (eps. 1–2, 4, 6–7, 9)
- Shion Satō – Kenta Samejima (eps. 1–2, 4, 6–7, 9)
- Sakura – Naomi Yokomine (eps. 1–4, 6–7)
- Kōsuke Yabe – Haruo (eps. 1-5,7-10)
- Takeo Nakahara – Shinpei Hatano (eps. 1, 5, 8–9)
- Susumu Kurobe – Himuro's father (eps. 1, 9–10)
- Takashi Kobayashi – Mifune (eps. 2–3, 6–8, 10)
- Shigeru Yazaki – Inuzuka's father (eps. 4, 8)
- Kazufumi Miyazawa – Masataka Iwaki (eps. 5–8)
- Hirayama Hiroyuki – Kishibe (ep. 6)
- Ryuta Sato – Michio Ando (eps. 9–10)
