= Techni-Tool =

American distribution company

Techni-Tool, headquartered in Worcester, Pennsylvania, a suburb of Philadelphia, is a distributor of equipment for electronic production, assembly and repair in over 103 countries. It was founded by Ben Weiss, who formed the company from a mail order dental company, warehousing and distributing various types of dental materials and instruments. Due to the changing needs of the industry, the company evolved into a major distributor of electronic production equipment.

In 1960, Techni-Tool was incorporated and separated from the dental company entirely, though for many years they shared the same facility.

After Ben Weiss' three sons, Paul, Stuart and Steven, took over operation of the business in 2000, Techni-Tool moved from its Plymouth Meeting, Pennsylvania location to its new 112,000 sq. ft. (10,600 m^{2}) facility in Worcester. In 2006, the company employed over 200 people.

Techni-Tool is known through distribution of its catalog, and offers its own line of over 3,000 products, currently holding five government contracts.

In 2006, Rockwell Collins named Techni-Tool, Inc. as their MRO/Manufacturing Commodity Supplier of the Year.

Techni-Tool was acquired by W. W. Grainger on December 31, 2012, and later sold to TestEquity in July 2017.
