= Mitsuru Nakamura =

Japanese artist and poet

- Born: February 28, 1978 (age 48); Saga, Japan
- Other name: 326
- Occupations: Artist, poet
- Known for: Gitaroo Man
- Height: 172 cm (5 ft 8 in)

Mitsuru Nakamura (中村 満, Nakamura Mitsuru) is a Japanese artist and poet who also goes by the name 326. This name is pronounced the same as his first name, Mitsuru, coming from the Japanese pronunciations of the numbers 3, 2, and 6 in Japanese.

== Early life ==
Mitsuru Nakamura was born in Saga, Japan, where he graduated from Saga Higashi High School. While studying at a design school in Fukuoka, he began working as an illustrator. He was best known for his combination of pop stylings with poetry.

== Career ==
In 1999, Mitsuru was associated with the band 19 (pronounced jūkyū), where he was in charge of designing CD jacket art as well as providing lyrics for songs. After helping with the publication of the album Subete hē (すべてへ, "To Everything") in 1999, he parted from the band. In 2002, he produced a single entitled "Kayōbi no Uta" (火曜日の唄, "Tuesday Song"). From 2002 until 2013, he worked as a freelance illustrator.

In 2013, Nakamura joined the talent agency Titan, managed by Mitsuyo Ota. He stated in an interview on the TBS variety show Higashino and Ariyoshi's Rock Bottom (東野・有吉のどん底) that his departure from 19 and its management was due to unfair compensation, where he was paid only ¥100,000 per month during his tenure. This interview resulted in him being recruited by Mitsuyo Ota to his current talent agency, Titan, which he has been associated with since 2013.

Some particularly notable works include the PR campaign of a Japanese television network TBS, and the art design for the video game Gitaroo Man.

== Published works ==
- You're My Mommy. Letters from a Baby to his Mom ISBN 978-1935548041
