= Yoshitarō =

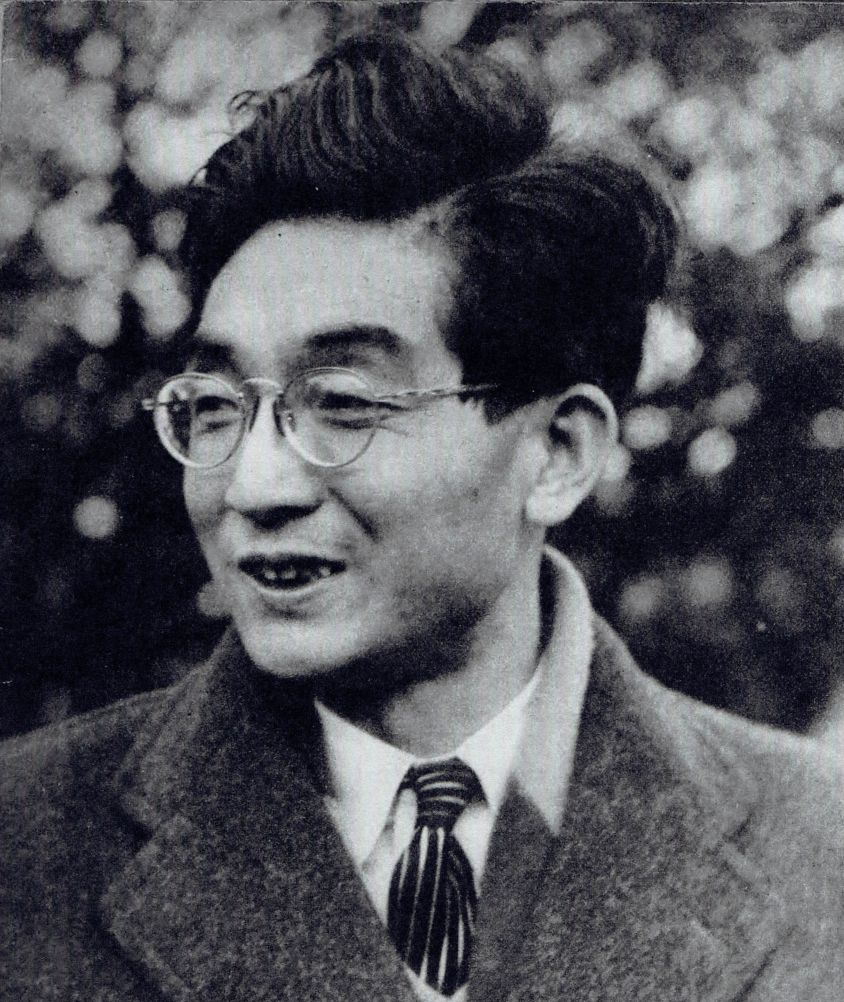
- Yoshitaro Nomura (1919–2005), Japanese film director, producer and screenwriter
- Pronunciation: joɕitaɾoɯ (IPA)
- Gender: Male

Origin
- Origin: Japanese
- Meaning: Different meanings depending on the kanji used

Other names
- Alternative spelling: Yositaro (Kunrei-shiki) Yositaro (Nihon-shiki) Yoshitarō, Yoshitaro, Yoshitarou (Hepburn)

Yoshitarō, Yoshitaro or Yoshitarou is a masculine Japanese given name.

== Written forms ==
Yoshitarō can be written using different combinations of kanji characters. Here are some examples:

The characters used for "taro" (太郎) literally means "thick (big) son" and usually used as a suffix to a masculine name, especially for the first son. The "yoshi" part of the name can use a variety of characters, each of which will change the meaning of the name ("吉" for good luck, "義" for justice, "良" and so on).

- 義太郎, "justice, big son"
- 吉太郎, "good luck, big son"
- 良太郎, "good, big son"
- 芳太郎, "fragrant/virtuous, big son"

Other combinations...

- 義太朗, "justice, thick, bright"
- 義多朗, "justice, many, bright"
- 義汰朗, "justice, excessive, bright"
- 良太朗, "good, thick, bright"
- 良多朗, "good, many, bright"

The name can also be written in hiragana よしたろう or katakana ヨシタロウ.

== Notable people with the name ==
- Yoshitaro Nagata (永田 吉太郎; born 1929), Japanese boxer
- Yoshitaro Nomura (野村 芳太郎; 1919–2005), Japanese film director, producer and screenwriter
