= Saburō =

- Gender: Male

Origin
- Origin: Japanese
- Meaning: Different meanings depending on the kanji used

Other names
- Related names: Taro; Jiro

Saburō or Saburo (さぶろう, サブロウ) is a masculine Japanese given name.

== Written forms ==
Saburō can be written using different kanji characters and can mean:

- 三郎, "third son"
- 三朗, "three, bright"

The name can also be written in hiragana or katakana.

== People with the name ==
- Saburo Aizawa (相沢 三郎; 1889–1936), Japanese soldier
- Saburo Aoki (青木 三郎; born 1956), Japanese linguist
- Saburo Date (伊達 三郎) 1924–1991, Japanese actor
- Saburō Eda (江田 三郎; 1907–1977), Japanese politician
- Saburo Fujiki (藤木 三郎; born 1955), Japanese golfer
- Saburo Hasegawa (長谷川 三郎; 1906–1957), Japanese calligrapher and painter
- Saburo Hayakawa (早川 三郎; 1888–1973), Japanese politician
- Saburō Hyakutake (百武 三郎; 1872–1963), Japanese admiral
- Saburo Ienaga (家永 三郎; 1913–2002), Japanese historian
- Saburo Ishikura (石倉 三郎; born 1946), Japanese actor
- Saburo Ito (伊藤 三郎; 1915–1978), Japanese swimmer
- Saburo Kamei (亀井 三郎; 1938–2013), Japanese voice actor
- Saburō Kawabuchi (川淵 三郎; born 1936), Japanese footballer and manager
- Saburo Kawamoto (川本 三郎; born 1944), Japanese film and literary critic
- Saburo Kido (城戸三郎; 1902–1977), American lobbyist, attorney, and newspaper editor
- Saburō Kitajima (北島 三郎; born 1936), Japanese Enka singer
- Saburo Komoto (河本 三郎; born 1950), Japanese politician
- Saburō Kurusu (来栖 三郎; 1886–1954), Japanese diplomat
- Saburō Matsukata (松方 三郎; 1899–1973), Japanese Scout leader
- Saburō Moroi (諸井 三郎; 1903–1977), Japanese composer
- Saburo Murakami (村上 三郎; 1925–1996), Japanese visual and performance artist
- Saburo Muraoka (村岡 三郎; 1928–2013), Japanese artist
- Saburo Okita (大来 佐武郎; 1914–1993), Japanese economist and politician
- Saburō Sakai (坂井 三郎; 1916–2000), Japanese World War II fighter pilot
- Saburo Sato (佐藤 三郎; born 1960), Japanese sailor
- Saburo Shimono (下野 三郎; born 1937), Japanese-American actor
- Saburō Shinoda (篠田 三郎; born 1948), Japanese actor
- Takagi Saburō (高木 三郎; 1841–1909), Japanese diplomat and businessman
- Saburō Takata (高田 三郎; 1913–2000), Japanese composer
- Saburo Teshigawara (勅使川原 三郎; born 1953), Japanese choreographer and dancer
- Saburō Tokitō (時任 三郎; born 1958), Japanese actor and singer
- Saburo Tokura (戸倉 三郎; born 1954), Japanese jurist
- Saburo Yokomizo (横溝 三郎; born 1939), Japanese middle-distance runner

== Fictional characters ==
- Saburo, a non-playable Mii opponent in the Wii series
- Saburo Arasaka, a character in the Cyberpunk role-playing game franchise
- Mutsumi Saburo from Sgt. Frog
- Saburo Kato from Space Battleship Yamato
- Saburou Aoyama (aka Goggle Blue) from Dai Sentai Goggle V
- Saburo (aka Hakaider) from Kikaider
- Saburo Ichimonji, the protagonist's third son, from Ran
- Sabnock Saburo from Mairimashita! Iruma-kun
- Saburō Niboshi, the Japanese name for the character Will Powers from Phoenix Wright: Ace Attorney".
