= Niro =

Niro may refer to:

- Niro (rapper), French rapper
- Niro Group, originally A/S Niro Atomizer, a Danish company acquired by GEA Process Engineering
- Niro Ceramic Group, a ceramics and porcelain tiles manufacturing company
- Nirō Station, a passenger railway station located in Kita-ku Kobe, Hyōgo Prefecture, Japan
- Kia Niro, an automobile made by Kia Motors

== See also ==
- Robert De Niro
- Nero (disambiguation)
- 二郎 (disambiguation)
