= Gitaroo Man =

2001 video game

- North American PS2 box art
- Developer: iNiS
- Publisher: Koei
- Director: Yukio Shimomura
- Designer: Keiichi Yano
- Artists: Kotaro Umeji, Mitsuru Nakamura
- Composers: COIL; Tomohiro Harada; YUAN
- Platforms: PlayStation 2, PlayStation Portable
- Release: PlayStation 2; JP: June 21, 2001; NA: February 18, 2002; EU: June 21, 2002; PlayStation Portable; JP: June 8, 2006; EU: September 29, 2006; NA: November 14, 2006
- Genre: Music
- Modes: Single-player, multiplayer

Gitaroo Man (Note: Gitaru Man (ギタルマン)) is a rhythm video game developed by iNiS and published by Koei for PlayStation 2. It features visual production by Mitsuru Nakamura and an original soundtrack by Japanese band COIL. The game was released in Japan on June 21, 2001, in North America on February 18, 2002 and in Europe on June 21, 2002. A port of the game for PlayStation Portable, titled Gitaroo Man Lives!, (Note: Known as Gitaroo Man Live! (ギタルマンライブ!, Gitaru Man Raibu!) in Japan) was released in 2006.

== Gameplay ==
An example of Gitaroo Man's charge mode

Gitaroo Man is a rhythm game in which the player character, U-1, faces against various opponents in musical battles. In each level, both the player and opponent has a life bar, with the player tasked with depleting the opponent's life bar and reaching the end of the song without running out of life. With some exceptions, each level consists of three main phases; Charge, Attack, and Guard, followed by the Harmony and End phases at the end of the level. During the Charge and Attack phases, players follow a "trace line" using the analog stick, upon which red "phase bars" will appear. By pressing and holding down the button at the start of a phase, timing it to its appearance at the center of the screen, and releasing the button at the end, the player plays music. In the Charge phase, successful notes restore the player's health, whereas in the Attack phase, successful notes damage the opponents whilst missed notes will hurt the player. During the guard phase, players must hit corresponding buttons as they reach the center of the screen to avoid attacks from the opponent, taking damage should they miss. Unlike the player's life, which ends the game if depleted, the opponent's life bar indicates the progress of the player. Most levels are split up into different sections, which can have multiple variations on each playthrough, and the player must damage the opponent enough to move onto the next section. Otherwise, they will have to repeat the section until enough damage is dealt. At the end of a level, players play through the Harmony phase, which is similar to the Attack phase, and keep on playing til the End phase, at which point the player will no longer take damage. After each level, players are given a rank based on their performance, with good ranks earning items for the collection, which unlocks character bios.

Masters' Play is an additional mode unlocked after clearing the game once. In this mode, gameplay is harder as more complex notes appear, the "trace line" becomes more complex with more twists and turns and thus harder to follow and players take more damage from mistakes. Versus Mode is a game for up four players, where players battle against each other in two teams playing Gitaroo Man's parts and his opponent's parts respectively. Not all songs are available in the mode, and some songs are altered to provide better balance for both players compared to the single player mode. The PSP version additionally features Duet Mode, in which two players can play co-operatively ad-hoc in two exclusive new levels; "Metal Header" and "Toda Pasion".

== Plot ==
Gitaroo Man follows a young boy named U-1 (Note: Pronounced "Yuuichi" in the Japanese version and "you-one" in the English version) who is often picked on by his rival Kazuya and passed over by the girl of his dreams, Pico. One day, as U-1 is suddenly attacked, his talking dog Puma transforms and gives him a weapon known as the Last Gitaroo, which transforms U-1 into the legendary warrior Gitaroo Man. After defeating many enemies, sent by Prince Zowie of the Gravillian Empire, and obtaining their Gitaroos, Puma brings a reluctant U-1 to Planet Gitaroo, which had been invaded by the Gravillian Empire. Upon arriving there, U-1 befriends a girl named Kirah, only to later discover that she is Zowie's gladiator. Refusing to fight her, U-1 uses the power of music to convince Kirah to stand up against Zowie. Obtaining all eight Gitaroos, U-1 becomes the True Gitaroo Man and defeats Zowie, after which he returns home as a more confident person.

== Soundtrack ==
The Gitaroo Man Original Soundtrack is an audio CD released in 2001, containing the majority of the songs found in Gitaroo Man. While it is missing the background music played during the Collection viewing and the Masters' Play versions of songs, it does have four "Ropeland" remixes of certain stages.

Gitaroo Man Original Soundtrack track listing
Disc 1 (62:03)
1. "Soft Machine (Opening Theme)" – 4:15
2. "Boogie for an Afternoon" – 2:01
3. "Twisted Reality" – 3:28
4. "Flyin' To Your Heart" – 3:59
5. "'Bee' Jam Blues" – 4:22
6. "VOID" – 1:55
7. "Nuff Respect featuring 'NAHKI'" – 4:51
8. "The Legendary Theme (Acoustic Version)" – 2:39
9. "Born To Be Bone" – 3:45
10. "Tainted Lovers" – 4:07
11. "Overpass" – 1:51
12. "The Legendary Theme (Album Version)" – 3:20
13. "Resurrection" – 3:55
14. "21st Century Boy (Ending Theme)" – 3:05
15. "Bonus: Twisted Reality (Ropeland Mix)" – 3:30
16. "Bonus: The Legendary Theme (Acoustic Version – Ropeland Mix)" – 2:37
17. "Bonus: The Legendary Theme (Album Version – Ropeland Mix)" – 3:22
18. "Bonus: Resurrection (Ropeland Mix)" – 4:01

== Release ==
Gitaroo Man Wan (ギタルマン ワン, Gitaru Man Wan), a budget trial version of the game, was released prior to the full game's Japanese launch, on April 5, 2001. It features the original TGS trailer, alternate versions of some of the game's songs, an art gallery mode, and a mini game starring Puma. Each copy also included three collectible cards with which players could play rock paper scissors.

THQ handled distribution of the title in Europe as part of a four-game deal with Koei.

=== Gitaroo Man Lives! ===
Gitaroo Man Lives!, known in Japan as Gitaroo Man Live! (ギタルマン ライブ！, Gitaru Man Raibu!), is a port of the game released for the PlayStation Portable in Japan on June 8, 2006, in Europe on September 29, 2006, and in North America on November 14, 2006. Along with local ad-hoc multiplayer and additional difficulty options, the game adds a new Duet mode, in which two players control Gitaroo Man and Kirah in two exclusive new stages, "Metal Header" and "Toda Pasión". These levels may also be played alone if the handheld's ad-hoc is activated.

== Reception ==
Gitaroo Man (and Lives!)

Aggregate score
Aggregator	Score	
Aggregator	PS2	PSP
Metacritic	82/100	80/100

Review scores
Publication	Score	
Publication	PS2	PSP
Eurogamer	N/A	7/10
Game Informer	9/10	9/10
GameRevolution	N/A	7/10
GameSpot	8.7/10	7.7/10
GameSpy	85/100	4.5/5
GamesRadar+	N/A	3/5
GameZone	9/10	8.6/10
IGN	8.5/10	8.4/10
Play	8/10	7.9/10
Pocket Gamer	N/A	4.5/5
VideoGamer.com	N/A	7/10

According to the game's designer Keiichi Yano, the game was commercially successful in the United States, where it sold more copies than it did in Japan.

Edge awarded the game a score of 7 out of 10; the game was later included in that magazine's staff- and reader-voted "Top 100 Games" list published in July 2007. Despite a number of positive reviews, the North American and European versions of Gitaroo Man were produced in very low quantities by Koei and, as a result, have become somewhat rare; it is regarded as a cult video game. Around November 2005 in North America, copies of Gitaroo Man began popping up in GameStop game stores. This was due to a reprint by GameQuestDirect, similar to their previous reprints of PlayStation RPGs Persona 2 and Rhapsody: A Musical Adventure, both of which were previously very rare. The game was also reissued in Europe around this time.

Blake Fischer reviewed the PlayStation 2 version of the game for Next Generation, rating it four stars out of five, and stated that "The genius here isn't in any bold gameplay innovations; it's that it delivers a fun, well-rounded package that is beautifully crafted." It was a runner-up for GameSpot's annual "Best Music on PlayStation 2" and "Best Game No One Played on PlayStation 2" awards.

=== Awards ===
- Received IGN's award for Best PSP Music Game of 2006.
