= Eight Below =

- Theatrical release poster
- Directed by: Frank Marshall
- Screenplay by: David DiGillio
- Based on: Antarctica by: Toshirô Ishi Dô; Koreyoshi Kurahara; Tatsuo Nogami; Susumu Saji
- Produced by: Patrick Crowley; David Hoberman
- Starring: Paul Walker; Bruce Greenwood; Moon Bloodgood; Jason Biggs
- Cinematography: Don Burgess
- Edited by: Christopher Rouse
- Music by: Mark Isham
- Production companies: Walt Disney Pictures; Spyglass Entertainment; Mandeville Films; The Kennedy/Marshall Company; Vertigo Entertainment
- Distributed by: Buena Vista Pictures Distribution
- Release date: February 17, 2006 (United States)
- Running time: 120 minutes
- Country: United States
- Language: English
- Budget: $40 million
- Box office: $120.5 million

Eight Below is a 2006 American survival drama film, a remake based on the 1983 Japanese film Antarctica by Toshirô Ishidô, Koreyoshi Kurahara, Tatsuo Nogami, and Susumu Saji. It was produced by Patrick Crowley and David Hoberman, directed by Frank Marshall, and written by David DiGilio, with music by Mark Isham. It stars Paul Walker in the leading role. It also stars Bruce Greenwood, Moon Bloodgood, and Jason Biggs.

It was released theatrically on February 17, 2006, by Buena Vista Pictures Distribution in the United States. The film is set in Antarctica but was filmed in Svalbard, Norway; Greenland; and British Columbia, Canada. It tells the story of a guide at an Antarctic research base who risks his life and the lives of his colleagues to save his dogs. The film received positive reviews from critics and earned $120.5 million on a $40 million budget.

== Plot ==
In January 1993, Jerry Shepard, guide at a National Science Foundation Antarctic research base, is asked to take UCLA professor Dr. Davis McClaren to Mount Melbourne to find a rare meteorite from Mercury. Since the ice conditions are poor, the best way to the mountain is by dog sled.

Shepard and McClaren make it, but are called back to base camp due to an approaching storm. McClaren begs for more time and Shepard gives him half a day. En route back to base, McClaren slips down an embankment, breaking his leg and falling into freezing water. Shepard uses lead dog Maya to carry a rope to McClaren and pulls him out. They battle hypothermia, frostbite, and near-whiteout conditions as the dogs lead them to base.

At base, the human crew is immediately evacuated, while the dogs are left behind. Shepard, promised that the pilot will return shortly for the dogs, tightens their collars to ensure they cannot get loose. Because of the harsh weather conditions a rescue cannot be attempted.

Back in the United States, Shepard tries to return for the dogs, but no one is willing to finance the expedition. Five months later, Shepard makes one last attempt. McClaren realizes his ingratitude and uses the remainder of his grant money to finance the rescue. They fear there is little chance any of the dogs could have survived so long, but they decide to try anyway.

The eight sled dogs – lead dog Maya, Old Jack, Shorty, Dewey, Truman, Shadow, Buck, and the young Max – have been waiting in the freezing conditions for Shepard to return. After a few days without eating, the dogs are prompted into action as a gull flies near, and they all begin to break free, one by one. Old Jack, by now too weak, remains attached. Maya tries to free him, but reluctantly leaves him behind when he shows no sign of wanting to leave. Maya joins the other dogs, and together they catch a few birds, getting their first food in weeks.

After nearly two months on their own, the dogs rest on a slope one night under the southern lights. Fascinated by the display, they run about and play until Dewey falls down an incline and is mortally wounded. The team sleeps by his side and Dewey dies overnight. Max loyally stays by him while the others move on. By the time Max heads in their direction, he has lost the pack.

Maya leads the team to the Russian base, which is unsecured and full of food, while Max finds his way back to the American base, which is locked up. Setting back out, Max recognizes the embankment the dogs traveled on their way back from Mount Melbourne. While exploring, Max finds a dead orca, but is driven off by a leopard seal nesting inside the body. Nearby, Maya and the team hear Max and join him. Max lures the seal away so the dogs can eat, but it doubles back and bites Maya, leaving her badly injured.

In a rage, the five other dogs attack the seal. Overwhelmed, the seal quickly drags itself into the water, after which the dogs feast on the orca. The reunited team continues traveling. Starving, freezing, and exhausted, the injured Maya collapses into the snow. The dogs lie down beside their leader as the snow piles up. They have been on their own for six months.

Shepard, meanwhile, has gone to New Zealand looking for a boat to take him to Antarctica. At a bar, he reunites with his friends and they make it to the base. Upon arrival, they are dismayed to find the body of Old Jack, still attached to the chain, and no sign of the other dogs. Then they hear barking and see Max, Shorty, Truman, Shadow, and Buck come over the horizon. After a joyous reunion, Shepard loads the dogs to leave, but Max runs off, leading Shepard to Maya, lying in the snow – weak, but alive. With six of his eight sled dogs, Shepard and his crew head back to civilization, with the last scene showing a memorial for the two fallen dogs, Old Jack and Dewey.

== Cast ==
- Paul Walker as Jerry Shepard
- Bruce Greenwood as Davis McClaren
- Moon Bloodgood as Katie
- Jason Biggs as Charlie 'Coop' Cooper
- Belinda Metz as Rosemary Paris
- Connor Levins as Eric McClaren
- Duncan Fraser as Captain Lovett
- Michael David Simms as Armin Butler
- Malcolm Stewart as Charles Buffett

== Background ==
The 1958 Japanese Antarctic Research Expedition (Showa Station) inspired the 1983 hit film Antarctica, of which Eight Below is a remake. Eight Below adapts the events of the 1958 incident, moved forward to 1993. In the 1958 event, 15 Sakhalin Husky sled dogs were abandoned when the expedition team was unable to return to the base. When the team returned a year later, two dogs, Taro and Jiro, were still alive. Seven were dead, still chained up, and six were unaccounted for. In Eight Below, two of the dogs, Old Jack and Dewey died, while the remaining six, Max, Maya, Truman, Buck, Shadow and Shorty, survived.

Eight Below was dedicated to the memory of Koreyoshi Kurahara, the director of Antarctica, who died in 2002.

The film was originally titled Antarctica: The Journey Home.

=== Sled dogs ===
In Eight Below there are two Alaskan Malamutes (Buck and Shadow) and six Siberian Huskies (Max, Maya, Truman, Dewey, Shorty, and Old Jack). Each actor-dog had help from other dogs that performed stunts and pulled sleds. In all, over 30 dogs were used to portray the film's eight canine characters. The animal filming was supervised by the American Humane Association, and the film carries the standard "No animals were harmed..." disclaimer, despite an on-set incident in which a trainer used significant force to break up an animal fight.

== Release ==
=== Critical reception ===
On the review aggregator website Rotten Tomatoes, 73% of 152 critics' reviews are positive, with an average rating of 7.8/10. The website's consensus reads: "Featuring a stellar cast of marooned mutts, who deftly display emotion, tenderness, loyalty and resolve, Eight Below is a heartwarming and exhilarating adventure film." Metacritic, which uses a weighted average, assigned the film a score of 64 out of 100, based on 31 critics, indicating "generally favorable" reviews. Audiences surveyed by CinemaScore gave the film a grade "A" on scale of A to F.

Roger Ebert of the Chicago Sun-Times gave the film 3 out of 4 stars, writing: "Eight Below succeeds as an effective story." BBC liked the movie as well, but did not like its long length (2 hours). Reel.com liked it, saying "the movie succeeds at drawing you into their incredible adventure". Peter Hartlaub of the San Francisco Chronicle disliked the film, saying: "The movie is overly long and much too intense for small children, yet it's filled with dialogue and plot turns that are too juvenile to thrill adult audiences."

William Arnold of the Seattle Post-Intelligencer reacted favorably ("the dog actors will melt your heart"), but pointed out, as did other reviewers, that "Antarctica buffs" will be critical of errors, such as portraying midwinter events in "balmy, blazing daylight at a time Antarctica is locked in round-the-clock darkness and temperatures of 140 degrees below."

=== Box office ===
The film opened at #1 on February 17, 2006, with a total weekend gross of $20,188,176 in 3,066 theaters, averaging to about $6,584 per theater. The film closed on June 1, 2006, with a total worldwide gross of $120,453,565 ($81,612,565 domestic and $38,841,000 in other territories).

== Awards ==
Wins

- ASCAP Film and Television Music Awards: ASCAP Award, Top Box Office Films (Mark Isham) 2007.

Nominations

- Satellite Awards: Satellite Award, Best Youth DVD, 2006.

== Home media ==
The film was released on DVD in June 2006. It was released on PlayStation Portable, an original widescreen format, in June 2006. The film was released on high-definition Blu-ray for an original widescreen presentation in September 2006.

In North America, the DVD release has sold more than 3 million units and grossed $105 million.
