= MonotaRO =

Japanese e-commerce company

MonotaRO Co., Ltd.
- Traded as: TYO: 3064
- Industry: Internet, online retailing
- Founded: October 19, 2000
- Headquarters: Osaka, Japan
- Key people: Masaya Suzuki (President)
- Revenue: ¥34.556 billion (FY2013)
- Operating income: ¥3.885 billion (FY2013)
- Net income: ¥2.289 billion (FY2013)
- Total assets: ¥14.505 billion (FY2013)
- Total equity: ¥7.282 billion (FY2013)
- Parent: W. W. Grainger, Inc.
- Website: www.monotaro.com

MonotaRO Co., Ltd., is a Japanese e-commerce company of industrial supply products based in Osaka, Japan. The company was named to Forbes Asia "Best Under A Billion" list in 2013.

== Overview ==
MonotaRO sells Maintenance, repair, and operations products through internet and catalogs, targeting small and mid-sized manufacturing companies. MonotaRO sells various product categories such as personal protective equipment, hand tools, fasteners, and lab supplies. It has more than 1 million customers in Japan.

The company name MonotaRO is an acronym for Maintenance, Repair & Operations. It also means to have sufficient number of products in Japanese. It is also a play on the name of the Japanese hero Momotaro.

== Global expansion ==
In 2013, MonotaRO began web-based sales in Singapore. In 2014 web-based sales expanded to Malaysia, Thailand, and Australia. Now they ship to following countries (countries names are arranged alphabetically).

- Bangladesh
- Bhutan
- Brunei Darussalam
- Cambodia
- Cook Islands
- East Timor
- Fiji
- Indonesia
- Kiribati
- Lao People's Democratic Republic
- Malaysia
- Maldives
- Marshall Islands
- Micronesia, Federated States of
- Mongolia
- Nauru
- Nepal
- Pakistan
- Palau
- Papua New Guinea
- Philippines
- Samoa
- Singapore
- Solomon Islands
- Sri Lanka
- Taiwan
- Thailand
- Tonga
- Tuvalu
- Vanuatu
- Vietnam
- India

== History ==
- 2000 - Sumitomo and W. W. Grainger, Inc. founded a company as joint venture in Japan
- 2001 - Website launch, which began and nationwide sales
- 2004 - Start selling private label (MonotaRO, Otokomae-MonotaRO, and Osaka-Spirit)
- 2006 - Launch IHC MonotaRO, targeting private use customers
- 2006 - Listed on the Tokyo Stock Exchange
- 2009 - W. W. Grainger, Inc. acquired a majority ownership of the company
- 2013 - Started service in Singapore
- 2014 - Started service in Malaysia, Thailand, and Australia
