= Kotaro Azuse =

Japanese baseball player (born 1967)

- Pitcher
- Born: May 6, 1967 (age 58); Kumamoto, Japan
- Batted: Left Threw: Left

debut
- August 8, 1990, for the Yokohama Taiyo Whales

Last appearance
- August 18, 2000, for the Osaka Kintetsu Buffaloes

NPB statistics
- Win–loss record: 2–7
- ERA: 4.98
- Strikeouts: 105
- Stats at Baseball Reference

Teams
- Yokohama Taiyo Whales (1990 – 1992); Chiba Lotte Marines (1993 – 1996); Hiroshima Toyo Carp (1997 – 1998); Chunichi Dragons (1999); Osaka Kintetsu Buffaloes (2000)

Kotaro Azuse (東瀬 耕太郎, Azuse Kotaro; born May 6, 1967) was a Japanese Nippon Professional Baseball pitcher. He played with the Yokohama Taiyo Whales.
