= Taro (disambiguation) =

Taro (Colocasia esculenta) is a tropical plant grown primarily for its edible corms.

Taro may also refer to:

== Plants ==
- Alocasia macrorrhizos, giant taro
- Cyrtosperma merkusii, swamp taro
- Xanthosoma sagittifolium, blue taro

== Places ==
- Taro (river), a river in northern Italy
- Taro (department), a former administrative division of the First French Empire in present Italy, named after the Taro River
- Tarō, Iwate, Japan (田老町), former town in Shimohei District, Iwate Prefecture (now part of Miyako)
- Taro Island, community in the Solomon Islands, capital of Choiseul Province
- Tarou, Dominica, a small village in western Dominica

== Other uses ==
- Tarō (given name), a Japanese name, including list of persons and fictional characters with the name
- David Taro (born 1984), Solomon Islands soccer defender
- Gerda Taro (1910–1937), German war photographer
- Volkswagen Taro, a pickup truck, rebadge of the Toyota Hilux
- Ultraman Taro, a 1973 television series
- 48 Infantry Division Taro, an Italian infantry division of World War II
- "Taro", a song by the British band alt-J from the 2012 album An Awesome Wave
- Taro Pharmaceuticals, a pharmaceutical manufacturer
- Territorial Army Reserve of Officers, former name of the U.K. Army Reserve
- The monetary unit in the online game Cartoon Network Universe: FusionFall
- Taro, a dog that survived a winter in Antarctica; see Taro and Jiro

== See also ==
- Asashio Tarō (disambiguation)
- Tarro, a suburb of Newcastle, New South Wales, Australia
- Taarof, Persian customs
