= Sakutarō =

- Gender: Male

Origin
- Origin: Japanese
- Meaning: Different meanings depending on the kanji used

Sakutarō, Sakutaro or Sakutarou (written: 作太郎 or 朔太郎) is a masculine Japanese given name. Notable people with the name include:

- Sakutarō Hagiwara (萩原 朔太郎; 1886–1942), Japanese writer
- Sakutarō Iwasa (岩佐 作太郎; 1879–1967), Japanese anarchist
- Sakutaro Tachi (立 作太郎; 1874–1943), Japanese legal scholar

== Fictional characters ==
- Sakutaro (さくたろう), a character in the sound novel Umineko no Naku Koro ni
- Sakutaro Higashi (東 才空太郎), a character in the upcoming visual novel Danganronpa 2x2
