= Shintarō =

Shintarō is any of several Japanese male given names. They consist of a prefix followed by "tarō", which alone is a name common among first sons. Prefixes carry additional meaning, such as "new"; many of these can stand alone as a given name.

== Written forms ==
Forms in kanji can include: 新太郎, 慎太郎, 信太郎, 真太郎, 晋太郎.

== Notable people ==
- Shintaro Abe (安倍 晋太郎, 1924–1991), Japanese politician
- Shintarō Arakawa (荒川 慎太郎, born 1971), Japanese linguist
- Shintarō Asanuma (浅沼 晋太郎, born 1976), Japanese scriptwriter, director, actor, voice actor
- Shintaro Ejiri (江尻 慎太郎, born 1977), Hokkaidō Nippon Ham Fighters baseball player
- Shintaro Fujinami (藤浪 晋太郎, born 1994), Japanese baseball player for the Oakland Athletics
- Shintarō Fujiyama (藤山 新太郎, born 1954), Japanese stage magician
- Shintarō Hashimoto (橋本 信太郎, 1892–1945), Japanese admiral
- Shintarō Hirase (平瀬 信太郎, 1884–1939), Japanese malacologist
- Shintarō Hirose (広瀬 新太郎, born 1962), baseball player for Yokohama Taiyō Whales and other teams
- Shintaro Ikeda (池田 信太郎, born 1980), Japanese badminton player
- Shintaro Ishihara (石原 慎太郎, 1932–2022), Tokyo governor
- Shintaro Ito (伊藤 信太郎, born 1953), Japanese politician
- Shintarō Kaidō (皆藤 慎太郎, born 1968), TBS announcer
- Shintaro Katsu (勝 新太郎, 1931–1997), Japanese actor
- Shintaro Kimura (木村 慎太郎, born 1987), Japanese sprinter
- Shintaro Nago (名古 新太郎, born 1996), Japanese footballer
- Nakaoka Shintarō (中岡 慎太郎, 1838–1867), Japanese samurai
- Shintarō Saitō (斎藤 慎太郎, born 1993), Japanese shogi player
- Shintaro Sakamoto (坂本 慎太郎, born 1967), Japanese musician
- Shintaro Shimizu (清水 慎太郎, born 1992), Japanese footballer
- Shintarō Suzuki (鈴木 信太郎, 1884–1958), Japanese politician
- Shintaro Tsuji (辻 信太郎, born 1927), Japanese entrepreneur
- Shintaro Uda (宇田 新太郎, 1896–1976), Japanese inventor
- Shintaro Yamada (山田 親太朗, born 1986), Japanese model, actor and singer
- Shintaro Yamada (businessman) (山田 進太郎, born 1977), Japanese businessman
- Yamashita Shintarō (山下 新太郎, 1881–1966), Japanese painter
- Shintaro Yoshida (由田 慎太郎, born 1981), Japanese baseball player
- Shintaro Yoshitake (吉武 真太郎, born 1975), Fukuoka SoftBank Hawks baseball player

== Fictional characters ==
- Akikusa Shintaro, the nom de guerre of the lead character from the cult 1960s Japanese TV series The Samurai
- Shintarō Kisaragi (如月 伸太郎), protagonist of the anime, light novels, manga series Kagerou Project, also known as Mekakucity Actors
- Shintarou Natsume (夏目 慎太郎), character from the Beelzebub manga and anime series
- Shintarō Midorima (緑間 真太郎), character from the Kuroko's Basketball manga and anime series
