= Ryūtarō =

Ryūtarō, Ryutaro, Ryuutarou or Ryuutaroh is a masculine Japanese given name. Notable people with the name include:

- Ryutarou Akimoto (秋元 龍太朗; born 1995), Japanese actor and model
- Ryutaro Hashimoto (橋本 龍太郎; 1937–2006), Japanese politician
- Ryūtarō Hirota (弘田 龍太郎; 1892–1952), Japanese composer
- Ryūtarō Matsumoto (松本 隆太郎; born 1986), Japanese sport wrestler
- Ryutaro Nakahara (中原 龍太郎; born 1979), stage name Ryu☆, Japanese musician and DJ
- Ryūtarō Nakamura (中村 隆太郎; 1955–2013), Japanese director and animator
- Ryutaro Nonomura (野々村 竜太郎; born 1966), Japanese politician and convicted fraudster
- Ryūtarō Ono (小野 隆太郎; 1885–1965), Japanese photographer
- Ryūtarō Ōtomo (大友 柳太朗; 1912–1985), Japanese film actor

== See also ==
- Ryutaros, a character from Kamen Rider Den-O
- Ryōtarō
