= Shuntarō =

- Gender: Male

Origin
- Origin: Japanese
- Meaning: Different meanings depending on the kanji used

Shuntarō, Shuntaro or Shuntarou (written: 俊太郎 or 舜太郎) is a masculine Japanese given name. Notable people with the name include:

- Shuntaro Furukawa (古川 俊太郎; born 1972), Japanese businessman
- Shuntaro Hida (肥田 舜太郎; born 1917), Japanese physician
- Shuntarō Itō (伊東 俊太郎; born 1930–2023), Japanese historian and educator
- Takanoyama Shuntarō (隆の山 俊太郎; born 1983), Czech sumo wrestler
- Shuntarō Tanikawa (谷川 俊太郎; born 1931), Japanese poet and translator
- Shuntaro Torigoe (鳥越 俊太郎; born 1940), Japanese journalist and activist
