= Antarctica (1983 film) =

1983 film

- Film poster
- Directed by: Koreyoshi Kurahara
- Written by: Toshirō Ishidō; Koreyoshi Kurahara; Tatsuo Nogami; Susumu Saji
- Produced by: Tomohiro Kaiyama; Masaru Kakutani; Koretsugo Kurahara; Juichi Tanaka
- Starring: Ken Takakura; Tsunehiko Watase; Eiji Okada; Masako Natsume
- Cinematography: Akira Shiizuka
- Edited by: Koreyoshi Kurahara; Akira Suzuki
- Music by: Vangelis
- Distributed by: Nippon Herald Films; Toho
- Release date: 23 July 1983 (Japan)
- Running time: 143 minutes (Japanese version); 112 minutes (American version)
- Country: Japan
- Language: Japanese
- Box office: $103 million (est.)

Antarctica (Japanese: 南極物語, Hepburn: Nankyoku Monogatari; lit. "South Pole Story") is a 1983 Japanese drama film directed by Koreyoshi Kurahara and starring Ken Takakura. Its plot centers on the 1958 ill-fated Japanese scientific expedition to the South Pole, its dramatic rescue from the severe weather conditions on the return journey, the relationship between the scientists and their loyal and hard-working Sakhalin huskies, particularly the lead dogs Taro and Jiro, and the fates of the 15 dogs left behind to fend for themselves.

The film was a big cinema hit globally, but particularly in Japan, where it held the box office record for Japanese-produced films, until it was eventually surpassed by Hayao Miyazaki's Princess Mononoke in 1997.

The original electronic synthesizer score was created by Greek composer Vangelis, who had recently written music for Chariots of Fire and Blade Runner. The soundtrack is available worldwide in various formats as Antarctica.

== Plot ==
In February 1958, the Second Cross-Winter Expedition for the Japanese Antarctic Surveying Team rides on the icebreaker Sōya to take over from the 11-man First Cross-Winter Expedition. The First Cross-Winter Expedition retreats by helicopter, leaving 15 Sakhalin huskies chained up at the Showa Base for the next Expedition.

Due to the extreme weather conditions, Sōya can not get near enough to the base and it is decided not to proceed with the handover, leaving the base unmanned. The team is worried about the dogs, as the weather is extremely cold and only one week of food for the dogs has been left. They wish to rescue them but in the end are unable to, due to a shortage of fuel and drinking water.

Eight of the fifteen sled dogs manage to break loose from their chains (Riki, Anko, Shiro, Jakku, Deri, Kuma, Taro, and Jiro), while the other seven starve. As the eight journey across the frozen wilderness, they are forced to survive by hunting penguins and seals on the ice shelves and even by eating seal excrement. As the months pass, most die or disappear. Riki is fatally injured by a killer whale while trying to protect Taro and Jiro. Anko and Deri fall through the ice and drown in the freezing waters. Shiro falls off a cliff to his death, and Jakku and Kuma disappear in the wilderness.

Eleven months later, on 14 January 1959, Kitagawa, one of the dog handlers in the first expedition, returns with the Third Cross-Winter Expedition, wanting to bury his beloved dogs. He, along with the two dog-handlers Ushioda and Ochi, recover the frozen corpses of the seven chained dogs, but are surprised to discover that eight others have broken loose. To everyone's surprise, they are greeted warmly at the base by Taro and Jiro, brothers who were born in Antarctica.

It is still unknown how and why they survived, because an average husky can only live in such conditions for about one month. In the movie, the director used the data available, together with his imagination, to reconstruct how the dogs struggled with the elements and survived.

== Cast ==
- Ken Takakura as Akira Ushioda
- Tsunehiko Watase as Kenjirō Ochi
- Eiji Okada as Chief Ozawa
- Masako Natsume as Keiko Kitazawa
- Keiko Oginome as Asako Shimura
- Takeshi Kusaka as Morishima Kyōju
- Shigeru Kōyama as Horigome Taichō
- So Yamamura as Iwakiri Senchō
- Jun Etō as Tokumitsu Taiin
- Kōichi Satō as Toda Taichō
- Shin Kishida as Kissaten Master
- Takeshi Ōbayashi as Nonomiya Taichō
- Shinji Kanai as Ozaki Taichō

== Production ==
The film took over three years to make. It was filmed at the northern tip of Hokkaidō. The dogs in the film were sired by Kuma, a Sakhalin from Furen and were born in Wakkanai, Hokkaidō. Some footage was shot in Antarctica in the summer of 1982 using dog teams from Scott Base, operated by New Zealand.

== Release ==
Antarctica was entered into the 34th Berlin International Film Festival. It was released in Japan in 1983, and in France in 1985. As of 2007, the film is available on DVD in Japan (Japanese subtitles) and Hong Kong (Chinese and English subtitles).

== Reception ==
=== Influence ===
The breed of dog became briefly popular. However, concerns were raised that the dogs who took part in the filming might have been subjected to extreme conditions to obtain the degree of realism involved. American Humane withheld its "No Animals Were Harmed" disclaimer, rating the film "Unacceptable" due to what it regarded as deliberate cruelty on the set.

The director responded that the emotions shown by the dogs during the film were painstakingly captured and then edited into the relevant parts. In order to recreate the death scenes the dogs were carefully anesthetized. The parts where the dogs drowned or fell were done in the studio and blue-screened with the actual filming location. The blood on the dogs was fake. It remained unclear whether the deaths of the prey animals, a seabird and a seal, were also simulated.

=== Box office ===
The film was a big hit in Japan, where it sold 3.5 million tickets in pre-sales prior to release. It became the number-one Japanese film on the domestic market in 1983, earning ¥5.9 billion in distributor rental income. It became the highest-grossing domestic film in Japan up until then with ¥11 billion ($101 million) in gross receipts, from 12 million ticket sales in the country. It held the domestic box office record for fourteen years. Adjusted for inflation, the film grossed the equivalent of $359 million in Japan as of 2025.

In France, the film sold 543,470 tickets at the box office, making it the 77th top-grossing film of 1985. At an average ticket price of 30 French francs ($3) in 1985, the film grossed an estimated 16.3 million francs ($1.63 million) in France. This brings the film's worldwide box office gross to an estimated total of approximately $103 million.

=== Awards ===
The film was selected as the Japanese entry for the Best Foreign Language Film at the 56th Academy Awards, but was not accepted as a nominee. It entered into the 34th Berlin International Film Festival, and at the Japan Academy Awards was nominated for the best film, cinematography, lighting, and music score, with the film winning the Popularity Award, for the two dogs Taro and Jiro, as most popular performer(s) of the year. The film won both the Best Cinematography and the Readers' Choice Award at the Mainichi Film Concours Awards. Antarctica was nominated for the Golden Bear Award at the 1984 Berlin International Film Festival, with said prize being that respective cinema institution's highest possible honor.

=== Adaptations ===
In 2006, Antarctica's plot was adapted into the American Disney live-action film remake Eight Below, which is dedicated to the memory of the director Koreyoshi Kurahara. A 2011 Japanese television drama series titled Nankyoku Tairiku centers on Japan's first expedition to Antarctica in 1958. It also carries the American Humane disclaimer "No Animals Were Harmed".

== Original score album ==
The original score to Antarctica was composed, arranged, produced and performed by Greek artist Vangelis. It was recorded at Vangelis' Nemo Studios, in London, UK, by sound engineer Raine Shine. The album was released worldwide, including Japan, as Antarctica.

== Fate of Taro and Jiro ==
The younger brother, Jiro, died at the age of four during the fifth expedition in July 1960. His body was made into a specimen and is placed together in the National Museum of Nature and Science at Ueno, Tokyo. The older brother, Taro, returned to Hokkaido University for his retirement, and died at the age of 15 in 1970. His body was made into a specimen at Hokkaido University.

== See also ==
- Cinema of Japan
- List of submissions to the 56th Academy Awards for Best Foreign Language Film
- List of Japanese submissions for the Academy Award for Best Foreign Language Film
- Survival film
