= Jūtarō =

- Gender: Male

Origin
- Origin: Japanese
- Meaning: Different meanings depending on the kanji used

Jūtarō, Jutaro or Juutarou (written: 重太郎) is a masculine Japanese given name. Notable people with the name include:

- Jutaro Kimura (木村 重太郎; born 1968), Japanese baseball player
- Jutaro Kuroda (黒田 重太郎; 1887–1970), Japanese artist

Jutarō, Jutaro or Jutarou (written: 壽太郎 or 受太郎) is a separate given name, though it may be romanized the same way. Notable people with the name include:

- Komura Jutarō (小村 壽太郎; 1855–1911), Japanese diplomat
- Jutaro Nakao (中尾 受太郎; born 1970), Japanese mixed martial artist
