= Rentarō =

- Gender: Male

Origin
- Origin: Japanese
- Meaning: Different meanings depending on the kanji used

Rentarō, Rentaro or Rentarou (written: 連太郎 or 廉太郎) is a masculine Japanese given name. Notable people with the name include:

- Rentarō Mikuni (三國 連太郎; 1923–2013), Japanese actor
- Mizuno Rentarō (水野 錬太郎; 1868–1949), Japanese statesman and politician
- Rentarō Taki (滝 廉太郎; 1879–1903), Japanese classical pianist and composer
- Rentaro Kita (北 廉太郎; 1920–1940), Japanese ryūkōka singer

Fictional Characters

- Rentarō Satomi from the light novel series Black Bullet
- Rentarō Aijō from the manga Kimi no koto ga Dai Dai Dai Dai Daisuki na 100-nin no Kanojo
- Rentaro Kagura From Kamen Rider Shinobi Kamen Rider Zi-O

== See also ==
- 8877 Rentaro, main-belt asteroid
