= Ryūtarō Ono =

Japanese photographer

Ryūtarō Ono (小野 隆太郎, Ono Ryūtarō; 1885–1965) was a Japanese photographer.
