= Kantarō =

- Gender: Male

Origin
- Origin: Japanese
- Meaning: Different meanings depending on the kanji used

Kantarō, Kantaro, Kantarou or Kantaroh (written: 貫太郎, 勘太郎 or 幹太郎) is a masculine Japanese given name. Notable people with the name include:

- Kantaro Hoshino (星野 勘太郎; 1943–2010), Japanese-born Korean professional wrestler, manager, and promoter
- Kantarō Suga (菅 貫太郎; 1934–1994), Japanese actor
- Kantarō Suzuki (鈴木 貫太郎; 1868–1948), Imperial Japanese Navy admiral and Prime Minister of Japan
- Kantaro Tomiyama (富山 幹太郎; born 1954), Japanese businessman

== See also ==
- Kantaro: The Sweet Tooth Salaryman, a Japanese television series
