= Ryōtarō =

- Gender: Male

Origin
- Origin: Japanese
- Meaning: Different meanings depending on the kanji used

Ryōtarō, Ryotaro, Ryoutarou or Ryohtaroh is a masculine Japanese given name. Notable people with the name include:

- Ryotaro Azuma (1893–1983), Japanese physician and bureaucrat, Governor of Tokyo 1959 to 1967
- Ryotaro Ishida (石田 凌太郎; born 2001), Japanese footballer
- Ryotaro Ito (伊藤 涼太郎; born 1998), Japanese footballer
- Ryotaro Masuchi (増地遼汰朗; born 2002), Japanese judoka
- Ryotaro Meshino (食野 亮太郎; born 1998), Japanese footballer
- Ryōtarō Okiayu (born 1969), Japanese voice actor
- Ryōtarō Shiba (1923–1996), Japanese author
- Ryotaro Shimizu (清水 良太郎; born 1988), Japanese actor and impressionist
- Ryōtarō Sugi (born 1944), Japanese singer and actor
- Ryotaro Tanose (born 1943), Japanese politician of the Liberal Democratic Party
- Ryotaro Yamamoto (山本 凌太郎; born 1998), Japanese footballer

== Fictional characters ==
- Ryotaro Nogami (野上 良太郎), a character from Kamen Rider Den-O
- Ryotaro Dojima (堂島 良太郎), a character in Persona 4

== See also ==
- Ryūtarō
