= Sakhalin Husky =

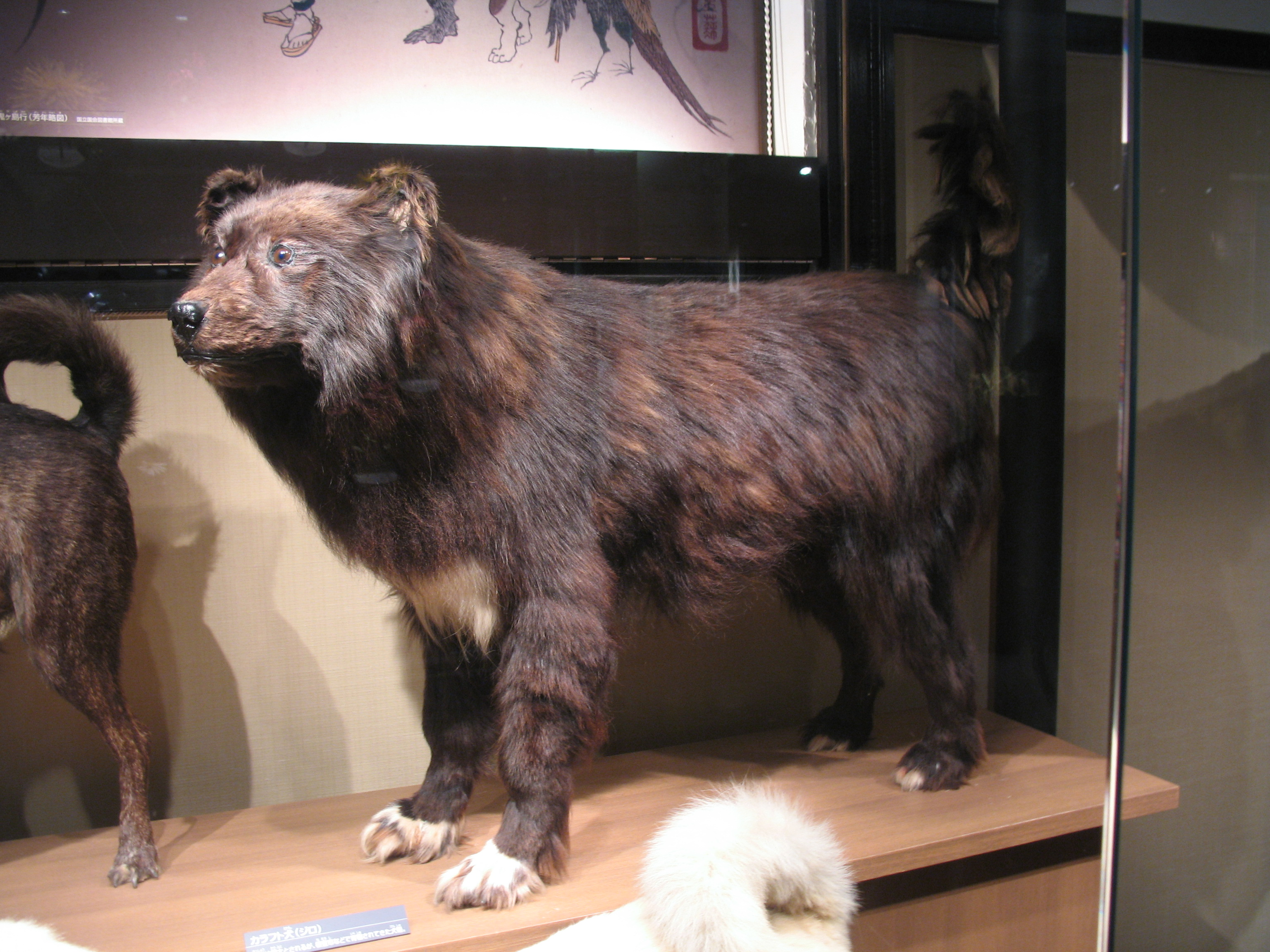
- Stuffed Sakhalin Husky named "Jiro" at the National Museum of Nature and Science, Tokyo
- Other names: Karafuto Ken, Sakhalin Laika, Gilyak Laika, Gilyak Sled Dog
- Origin: Russia, Japan
Traits
- Height: 56–66 cm (22–26 in)
- Weight: 30–40 kg (66–88 lb)
- Coat: Double
- Colour: Black, Gray, Brown, White, Russet, Cream, Biscuit

The Sakhalin Husky (Japanese: 樺太犬, Karafuto Ken; Russian: Сахалинский хаски; Chinese: 库页犬, Kuye Quan) is a critically endangered landrace and sled laika associated with Sakhalin Island and adjacent areas. They are also known as Karafuto Ken, Sakhalin Laika, or Gilyak Laika. While bred primarily as a sled dog, Sakhalin Huskies are also used for hunting bear and fishing. In 1989, there were approximately 20 Sakhalin Huskies remaining on Sakhalin Island.

== Description ==
=== Appearance ===
The body of the Sakhalin Husky is elongated, with a thick double undercoat. They are 56–66 centimetres (22–26 in) tall at the withers, and they weigh up to 30–40 kilograms (66–88 lb). The tail is held straight or slightly bent to the side. Historically, the Nivkh people would dock the last 1/3 of the tail at birth to prevent dogs from grabbing each other's tails while pulling a sled. Sakhalin huskies can have black, red, gray, and brindle coloring; however, black dogs are preferred as the color is the most visible during a snow storm. Sakhalin have triangular face with amber eyes and prick ears. The Sakhalin Husky are freighting sled dogs and evoke a sense of power due to its strong skeletal structure and well-developed muscles. They can drag more than 70 kilograms (150 lb) of cargo over distances as long as 100–150 kilometres (62–93 mi) at speeds of 10–11 kilometres per hour (6.2–6.8 mph) They have large paws and excellent endurance that allows them to cover long distances in snowy conditions in just a few days.

As a landrace, there is currently no breed standard.

=== Temperament ===
The Sakhalin Husky is calm, intelligent, and loyal. They have not been shown to be aggressive with people or other dogs. Sakhalin Huskies have high prey drives and are able to hunt and catch fish for themselves. Like other sled dogs, Sakhalin huskies need extensive exercise.

19th century mail route mushers would note the ability of Sakhalin huskies to navigate over ice floes during blizzards, even maintaining the correct course over the 480 kilometres (300 mi) from Nikolaevsky-on-Amur to Alexander post on Sakhalin.

=== Health ===
The Sakhalin Husky is a generally healthy breed resistant to disease, living up to 20–22 years.

== Etymology ==
In Russian the breed is often referred to as Сахалинский хаски or 'Sakhalin husky' as well as Сахалинская ла́йка or 'Sakhalin Laika'. Historic documents may also refer to them as Gilyak Laika, Gilyak being a Russian exonym for the Nivkh people. The Japanese name Karafuto Ken (樺太犬) comes from the combination of Karafuto (Japanese for 'Sakhalin') and Ken (Japanese for 'dog') and hence provides the breed's geographical origin.

== History ==
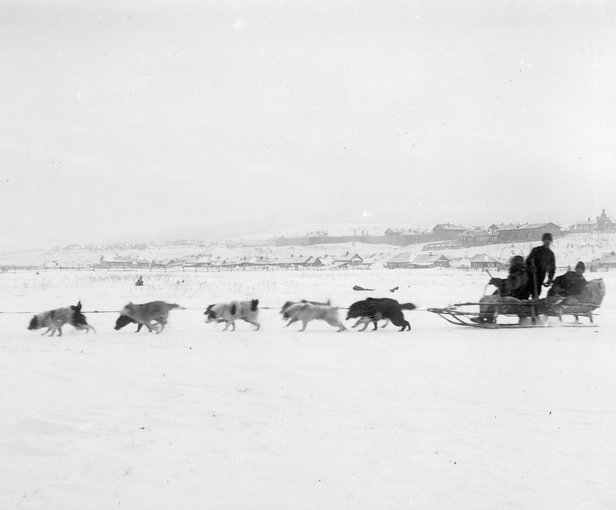
Sakhalin huskies photographed in 1895

=== Early history ===
The Sakhalin Husky was developed over centuries by the Nivkh people as a hardy, reliable sled dog and hunting dog for use on Sakhalin Island and along the adjacent shores of mainland Russia. The Nivkh were especially renowned for their expertise in dog sledding and breeding in the region, and neighboring ethnic groups often emulated their methods. Sakhalin Huskies are traditionally fed fish such as yukola, seal and bear lard. Their fur was used to make clothing for the Nivkh and the dogs would be consumed during times of famine.

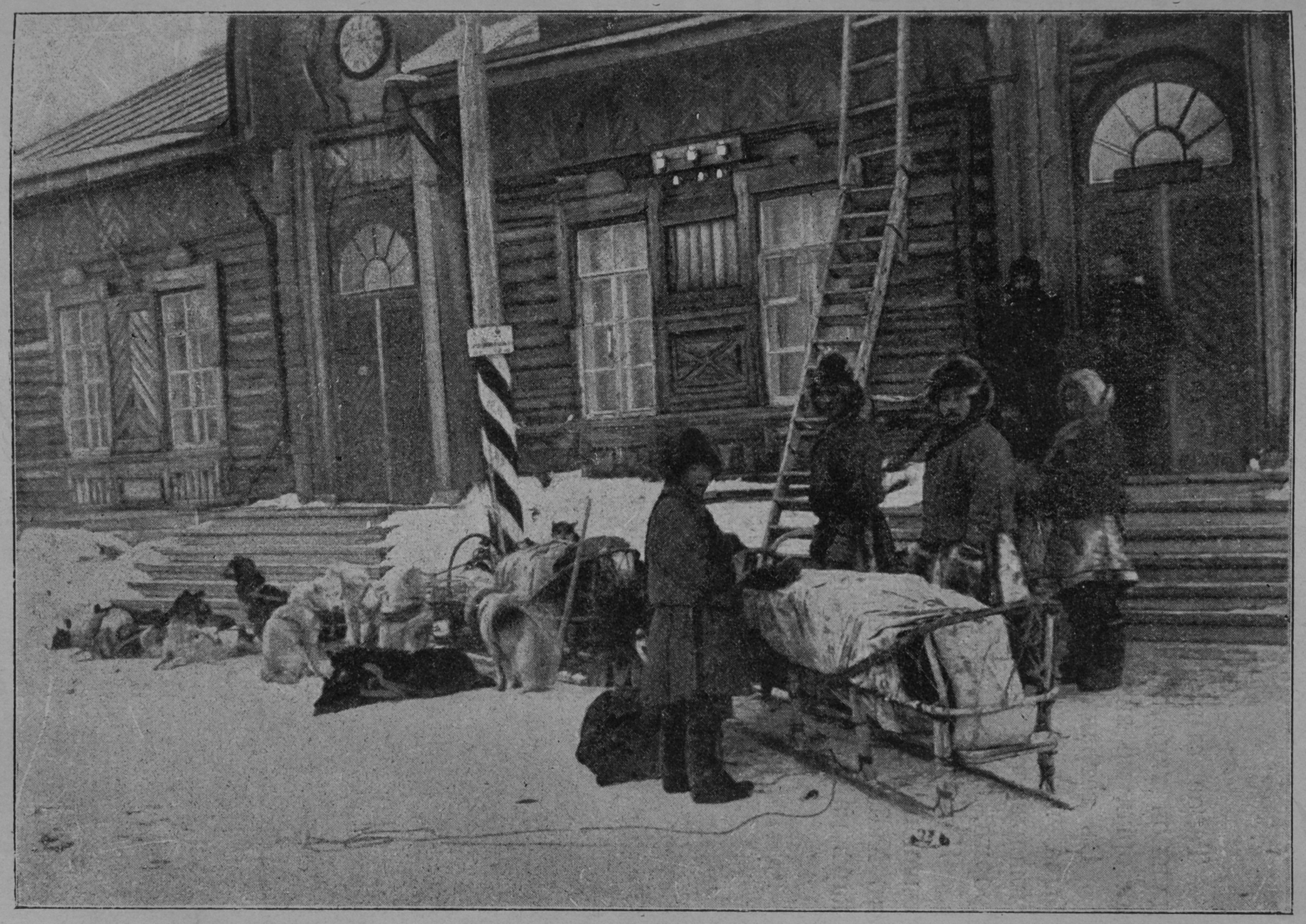
Dogsled mail on Sakhalin Island during the Russian Empire

Lack of roads and severe winter conditions in this region often made travel prohibitive and people relied on dog sled teams as the only dependable means to transport everything from mail and food to medicine and people. When there was sufficient ice buildup, Sakhalin huskies were used to cross the Strait of Tartary between Sakhalin and the mainland in winter, the distance between the town of Rybnovsk and the mainland being around 50 kilometres (31 mi). So valuable were Sakhalin Huskies that owning a team of dogs was considered a measurement of wealth and dogs were often awarded as payment by Nivkh elders to settle debts.

In 1808 and 1809 Japanese explorer Mamiya Rinzō (1780–1845), wrote in his report to the Edo shogunate: "Inhabitants [of the northern regions of Sakhalin] often use dogs. Every family, rich and poor, has dogs. They are played with and well taken care of. Often one person keeps 3–5 dogs, and even a whole family has quite a large number of them." Rinzō also presented drawings showing people resembling modern Nivkhs traversing the snowy plains in dog sleds.

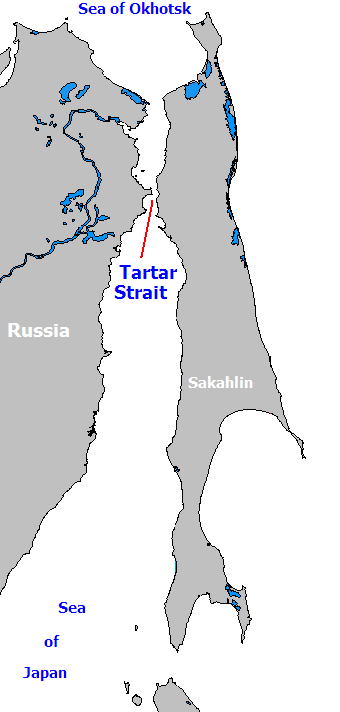
Strait of Tartary between Sakhalin Island and mainland Russia

Russian navigator and naval officer Gennady Nevelskoy briefly used Sakhalin Huskies during the Amur expedition of 1849–1855. Not knowing of the work of the Mamiya Rinzō forty years earlier, Nevelskoy's report was widely regarded in Russia as the first proof that Sakhalin is indeed an island.

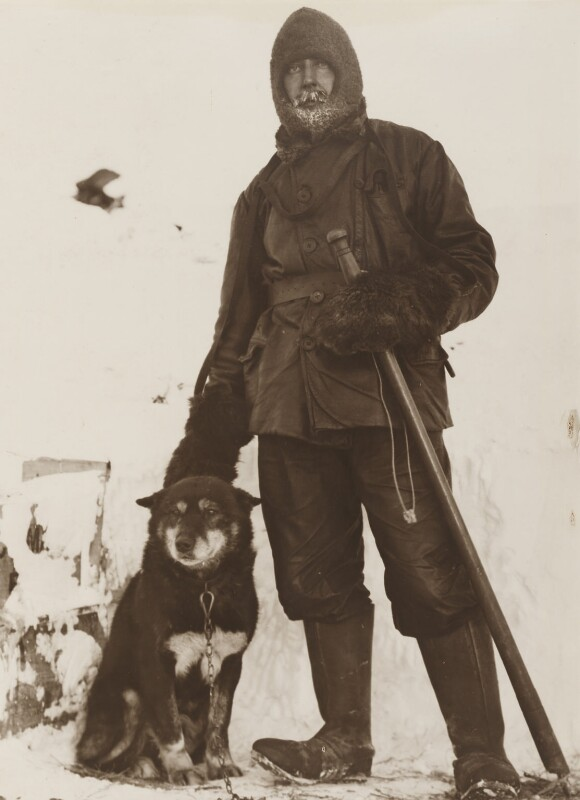
Osman, lead sled dog for the Terra Nova Expedition with Cecil Meares

Explorers of Franz Josef Land and northern Alaska were known to use Sakhalin Huskies. After having poor success with Samoyeds during his 1901–1904 Discovery Expedition, British explorer Robert Falcon Scott hired Sakhalin musher Dmitry Girev to purchase and care for 33 Sakhalin Huskies during his ill-fated Terra Nova expedition to Antarctica. Scott notes that the Sakhalin huskies were shorter than other sled dogs and had difficulty navigating in deep snow. The dogs were unable to use their docked tails to curl up to stay warm while resting, making them more sensitive to the extreme cold of Antarctica. Scott recounts falling into a crevasse with his entire sled team except lead dog Osman. Osman was able to hold onto the edge of the crevasse with only his feet and teeth until the rest of the team could be lifted out. Osman would survive the ill-fated expedition and spend the rest of his life with Gerov, and later at Wellington Zoo, New Zealand.

=== 20th century: Soviet and Japanese rule ===
In the 1920s and 1930s, Soviet policies on national minorities proved devastating to local dog populations. The Nivkh were forced into mass agricultural and industrial labor collectives called kolkhoz. Restrictions were placed on where to fish and how much fish each household could consume. Local hunters were sent to labor camps as punishment for hunting seal or bear. These policies irrevocably altered the lifestyle of the Nivkh. The traditional hunter-gatherer lifestyle disappeared and with it the ability to feed and care for the Sakhalin husky, and dogs were destroyed across northern Sakhalin Island.

Japanese forces invaded and occupied Sakhalin in the closing stages of the Russo-Japanese War in 1904–05. In accordance with the Treaty of Portsmouth of 1905, the southern part of the island below the 50th parallel north reverted to Japanese rule, while Russia retained the northern three-fifths. In 1920, during the Siberian Intervention, Japan again occupied the northern part of the island, returning it to the Soviet Union in 1925. From 1945 to 1948, many Nivkh, who had been living under Japanese jurisdiction in the southern half of Sakhalin, were forcibly relocated to Japan along with the ethnic Japanese settlers as a result of the Soviet-Japanese War in 1945. Sakhalin Huskies brought to Japan were highly valued for their work ethic, where they were used to unload ships and provide dog sled rides to tourists.

Sakhalin Huskies were used by the Red Army during World War II as pack animals for a short time, but it was found that they have a strong dietary preference for salmon and Soviet officials determined that the dogs were more expensive to feed than horses.

The Sakhalin Husky was thrust into the world spotlight during the ill-fated 1958 Japanese Antarctic Research Expedition. An emergency evacuation resulted in the abandonment of 15 Sakhalin Huskies at Showa Antarctic Research Station. The researchers believed that they would return in a few days and left the dogs chained up outside with a small supply of food. However, poor weather conditions prevented the relief team from reaching the outpost. Nearly one year later, a new expedition arrived and discovered that two of the dogs, Taro and Jiro, had survived and they became instant celebrities. Taro returned to Sapporo, Japan, and lived at Hokkaido University until his death in 1970, after which he was stuffed and put on display at the university's museum. Jiro died in Antarctica in 1960 of natural causes and his remains are located at the National Science Museum of Japan in Ueno Park.

=== Post–Soviet Union dissolution ===
With the further development of Sakhalin and advent of snowmobiles, the use of Sakhalin Husky continued to decline. By 2011, the landrace was critically endangered with only seven known individuals owned by musher Sergei Lyubykh. Japanese musher Isami Abe owned the last two Sakhalin Huskies in Japan. He notes that he attempted to import additional breeding stock prior to Lyubykh's death but bureaucratic indifference and lack of interest from the public as well as his own advancing age has impaired his efforts. Lyubykh died on 31 October 2014.

Before his death, Lyubykh notes that there were no longer enough known living specimens of the breed to provide the genetic diversity necessary for continued breeding. Despite this, he believed that the Sakhalin Husky could be revived, noting that "strong dogs still remain in the remote forest villages." He left his seven remaining Sakhalin dogs to his student, Oleg Seliverstov. Oleg Seliverstov has continued restoration efforts with Nikolai Chalkin. Today there are approximately 20 Sakhalin Huskies living on Sakhalin Island.

== In popular culture ==
The 1983 film Antarctica (南極物語, Nankyoku Monogatari, lit. "South Pole Story") recounts the Japanese scientific expedition to the South Pole, the dramatic rescue from the impossible weather conditions on the return journey, and the relationship between the scientists and their loyal and hard-working Sakhalin huskies. Due to difficulties in finding pure Sakhalin huskies, the dogs used in the movie were Sakhalin husky mixes.

A second film from 2006, Eight Below, provided a fictionalized version of the occurrence but did not reference the breed. Instead, the film featured only eight dogs: two Alaskan Malamutes named Buck and Shadow and six Siberian Huskies named Max, Old Jack, Maya, Dewey, Truman, and Shorty.

In 2011, TBS presented the TV drama, Nankyoku Tairiku, featuring Kimura Takuya. It tells the story of the 1957 Antarctica Expedition led by Japan and their Sakhalin Huskies.

The breed and the expedition are memorialized by three monuments: near Wakkanai, Hokkaido; under Tokyo Tower; and near Nagoya Port. Sculptor Takeshi Ando designed the Tokyo statues and was also the creator of the replacement of the famous Hachikō statue in front of JR Shibuya Station. The Tokyo statues were later removed, to be placed at Tokyo's National Institute of Polar Research.

== The Sakhalin Huskies of the 1957–1958 Japanese expedition ==
Few sources provide the names of the 15 Japanese sled dogs that were stranded, as well as the photos and descriptions of the Huskies. The names of the dogs, and their fates, are listed here:

1. Riki: Seven-year-old male with light gray coat and white markings, leader of the team. (disappeared)
2. Anko: Three-year-old male with brown coat and a white streak on the chest. (disappeared)
3. Aka: Six-year-old male with dark gray coat, had a tendency to pick fights with other team members. (deceased)
4. Kuma from Monbetsu: Five-year-old male with black coat, white socks, and white chest, sometimes served as lead dog. (deceased)
5. Kuma from Furen: Five-year-old male with black coat and a ripple of white on the chest. Father of Taro and Jiro. (disappeared)
6. Pesu: Five-year-old male with brown coat, black mask, and black ears, almost resembling a Belgian Tervuren. (deceased)
7. Goro: Four-year-old male with black coat and white stripe on the face, almost resembling a Collie. Served as wheel dog of the team. (deceased)
8. Deri: Six-year-old male with gray coat and a black saddle. (disappeared)
9. Pochi: Four-year-old male with light brown coat and a ravenous appetite. (deceased)
10. Moku: Four-year-old male with black coat and white socks on the front feet. (deceased)
11. Jakku: Four-year-old male with black-and-white coat, almost resembling a Collie. (disappeared)
12. Kuro: Five-year-old male with black coat and white markings on the face, muzzle, chest, and legs. (deceased)
13. Shiro: Three-year-old male with snow-white coat, sometimes served as lead dog. (disappeared)
14. Taro: Three-year-old male with black coat. Son of Kuma from Furen and older brother of Jiro. (survived)
15. Jiro: Three-year-old male with dark brown coat, a ripple of white on the chest, and white socks. Son of Kuma from Furen and younger brother of Taro. (survived)
