= Yoshitaro Nagata =

Japanese boxer

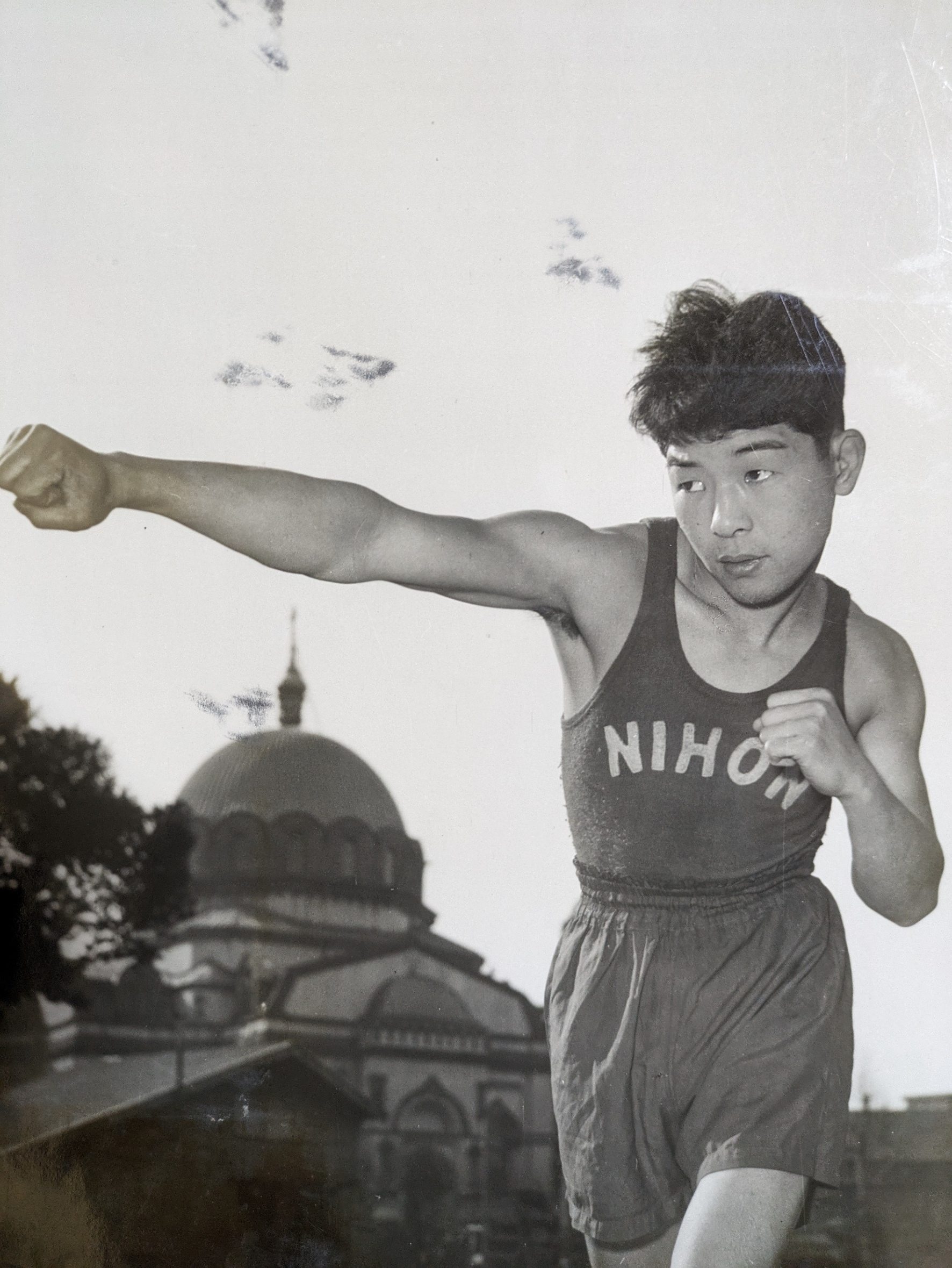

Personal information
- Nationality: Japanese
- Born: 28 December 1929

Sport
- Sport: Boxing

Yoshitaro Nagata (永田 吉太郎, Nagata Yoshitarō; born 28 December 1929) is a Japanese former boxer. He competed in the men's flyweight event at the 1952 Summer Olympics. At the 1952 Summer Olympics, he lost to Mircea Dobrescu of Romania.
