= Jiro Hirokawa =

Institute of Technology in Tokyo, Japan

Jiro Hirokawa (廣川 二郎, Hirokawa Jirō) is an engineer at the Tokyo Institute of Technology. In 2012, he was named a Fellow of the Institute of Electrical and Electronics Engineers (IEEE) for his contributions to high-gain and high-efficiency millimeter-wave planar waveguide slot arrays.
