= Kotaro Umeji =

Japanese graphic designer

- Occupations: Visual and Art Director, iNiS

Kotaro Umeji is a Japanese graphic designer. He has shaped the image of U-1 and other characters from the video game Gitaroo Man for the PlayStation 2 video game console and Gitaroo Man Lives! for the PlayStation Portable video game console, and the characters and art found in Osu! Tatakae! Ouendan and Elite Beat Agents both for the Nintendo DS video game console.

== List of works ==
- Gitaroo Man (2002), KOEI Corporation
- Osu! Tatakae! Ouendan (2005), Nintendo Co., Ltd.
- Gitaroo Man Lives! (2006), KOEI Co., Ltd.
- Elite Beat Agents (2006), Nintendo of America Inc.
