= Taro and Jiro =

Sakhalin Huskies; survived 11 months in Antarctica

Jiro (ジロ)
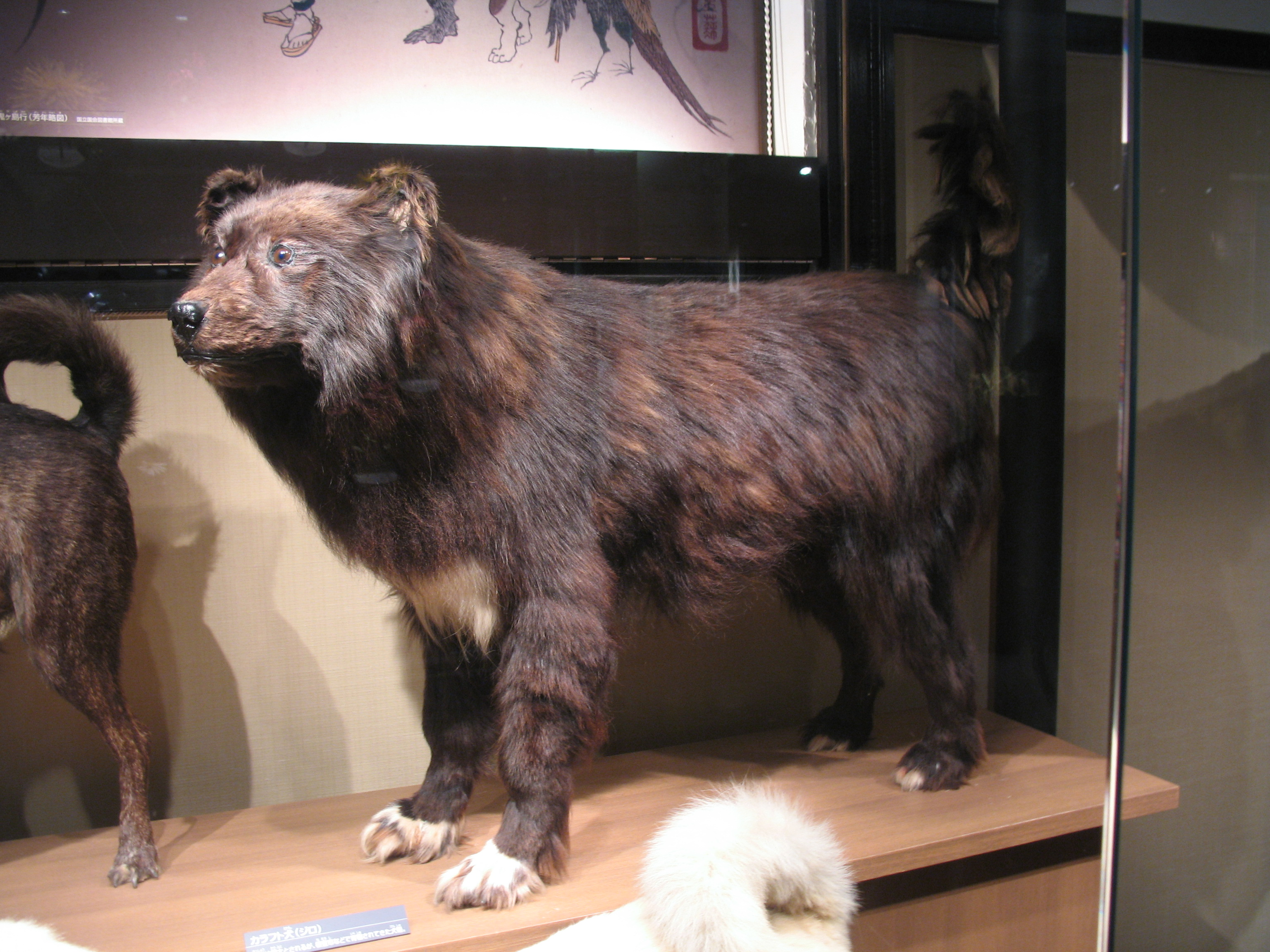
- Jiro, on display at the National Museum of Nature and Science
- Species: Dog (Canis familiaris)
- Breed: Sakhalin Husky
- Sex: Male
- Born: October 1955; Wakkanai, Sōya Subprefecture, Hokkaido, Japan
- Died: July 9, 1960 (aged 4); Showa base, East Ongul Island, South Pole
- Resting place: National Museum of Nature and Science

Taro (タロ)
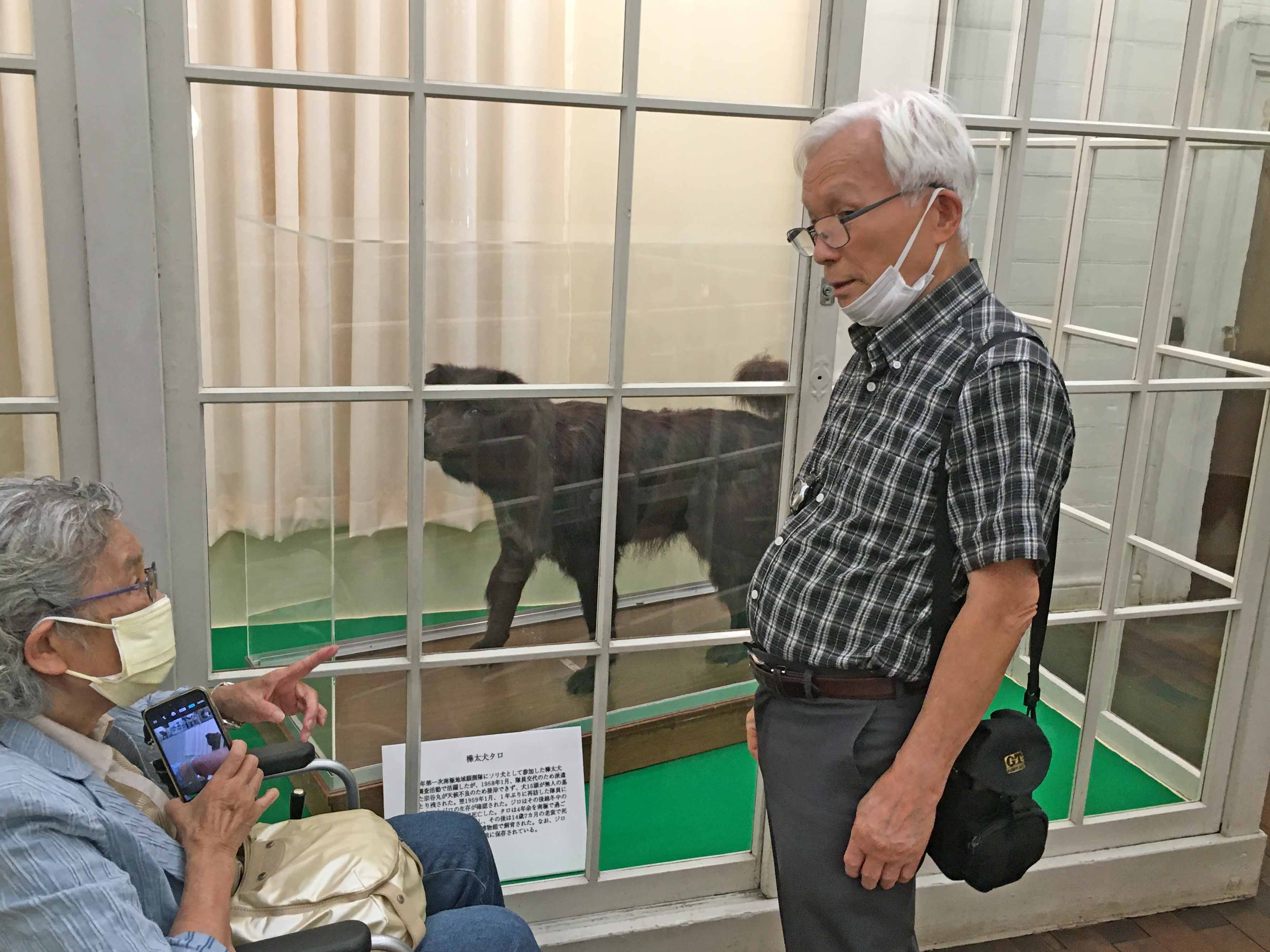
- Dr. Hisabu Abe in front of Taro's taxidermy, photographed in 2022 at Hokkaido University Botanical Garden
- Species: Dog (Canis familiaris)
- Breed: Sakhalin Husky
- Sex: Male
- Born: October 1955; Wakkanai, Sōya Subprefecture, Hokkaido, Japan
- Died: August 11, 1970 (aged 14); Hokkaido University Botanical Garden
- Resting place: Hokkaido University Botanical Garden

Taro (タロ; 1955–1970) and Jiro (ジロ; 1955–1960) were a pair of two Sakhalin Husky brothers who survived for eleven months in Antarctica after being left behind by the 1958 Japanese Antarctic Research Expedition. Due to poor weather conditions, the expedition was unable to airlift out 15 dogs, who were left chained and with only a few days' worth of food. Of these 15, seven of the dogs died on the chain, six of them disappeared, and two, Taro and Jiro, successfully overwintered and were discovered by the next research group the following spring.

The dogs became a media sensation after their discovery, and became Japanese symbols of perseverance and fortitude. Jiro remained in Antarctica and died there as a working dog in 1960. Taro was brought to Japan, where he died in 1970. Both of their bodies were taxidermied and placed on display. Several monuments to the dogs have been erected in Japan.

== Expedition ==
In 1957, the Japan National Institute of Polar Research began a multiyear research program in Antarctica to coincide with the International Geophysical Year. They established Showa Station on East Ongul Island in January 1957, and sent a team of 11 researchers and 19 Sakhalin Husky dogs as a sled team. Three of the huskies died during the expedition. One of the remaining 16 dogs, a white female dog named Shiroko, gave birth to a litter of eight puppies, bringing the entire dog team at the base up to 24 huskies.

The team was expected to be replaced in February 1958, but the ship Soya, carrying their replacement crew, became iced in and called for help from Burton Island, an American icebreaker. With Burton Island's assistance, a helicopter rescued the team at Showa. The plans to deploy the second year team were abandoned, and the helicopter rescue only included the humans at Showa, as well as the white female husky Shiroko and her eight puppies. The remaining 15 dogs were left chained, with several days' worth of food accessible.

In January 1959, a third team returned to Showa and sought to determine the fate of the dogs. Seven dogs had died while still chained, and eight had broken free. Six bodies were never recovered, but Taro and Jiro were found alive. These were the two youngest dogs on the team, at three years old, were brothers, and were the pups of Kuma, a dog that had also been on the chain at Showa, but had broken free and disappeared. The dogs that had died on the chain showed no signs of cannibalism. It was theorized that Taro and Jiro survived by learning to hunt penguins and seals and to eat frozen marine life that surfaced in ice cracks.

== Legacy ==
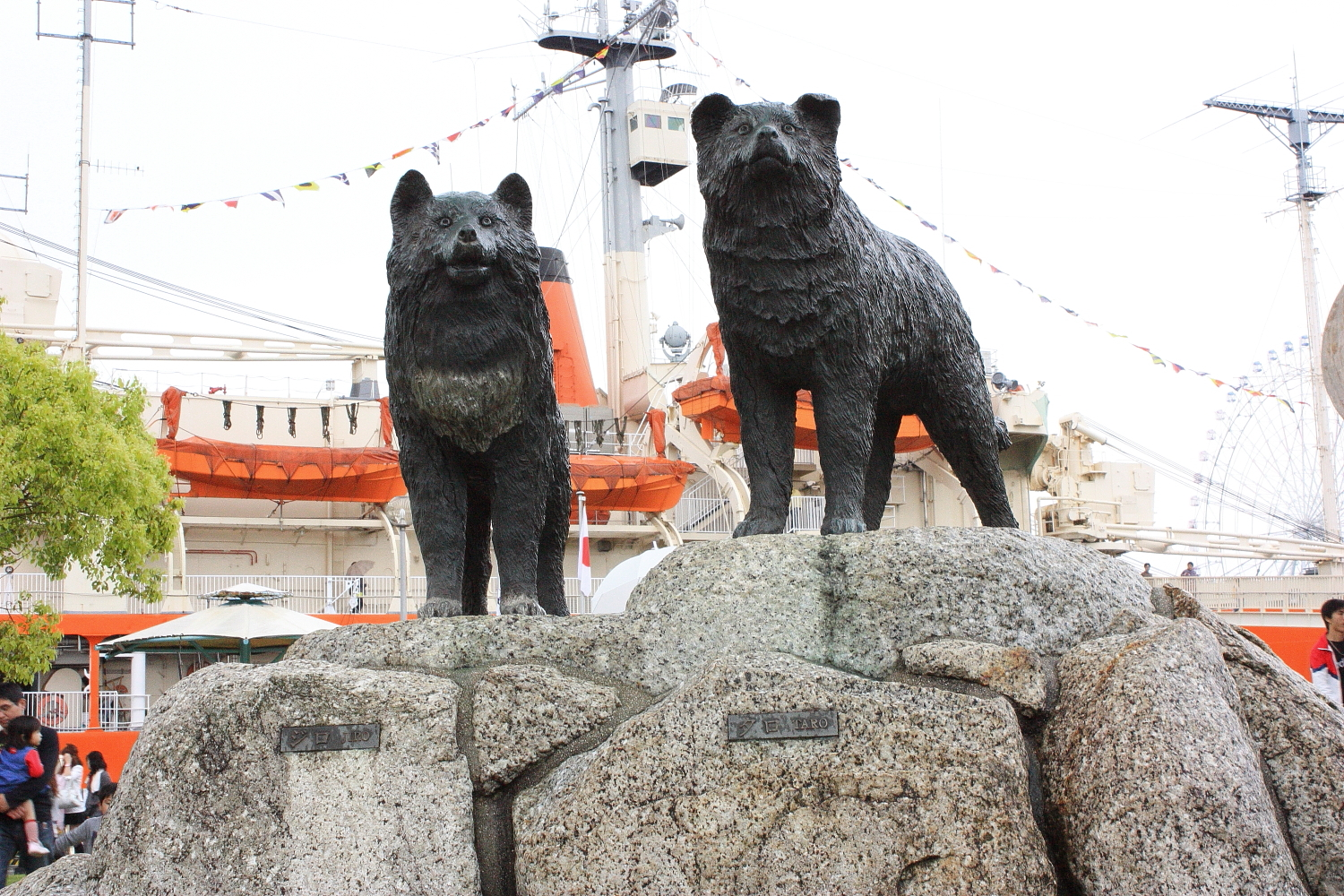
Statues of Taro and Jiro in Nagoya

The dogs' survival was a national news story at the time. Jiro continued working as a sled dog in Antarctica and died there in 1960. His remains were stuffed and moved to the National Science Museum of Japan, the same museum where Hachiko is displayed. Taro was relocated to Sapporo and lived the remainder of his life at Hokkaido University. He died in 1970, and was placed on display at a university museum.

Three monuments dedicated to the dogs have been constructed: near Wakkanai, Hokkaido; under Tokyo Tower; and near Nagoya Port.

The dogs' story was used as the basis for the 1983 film Antarctica, and the 2006 film Eight Below.

== See also ==
- List of individual dogs
