= Strawberry Road (1991 film) =

- Film poster
- Directed by: Koreyoshi Kurahara
- Screenplay by: Nobuo Yamada
- Based on: Strawberry Road by Yoshimi Ishikawa
- Produced by: Junichi Mimura; Shinya Kawai; Tomohiro Kaiyama; Shinjiro Kayama; Kôichi Murakami; Dennis Bishop
- Starring: Ken Matsudaira; Mako; Mariska Hargitay; Toshiro Mifune; Pat Morita
- Cinematography: Yūdai Katō
- Edited by: Akira Suzuki
- Music by: Fred Karlin
- Production company: Fuji Television
- Distributed by: Toho
- Release date: April 27, 1991 (Japan)
- Running time: 117 minutes
- Country: Japan
- Languages: Japanese; English; Spanish

Strawberry Road (Japanese: ストロベリーロード, Hepburn: Sutoroberi rodo) is a 1991 Japanese drama film directed by Koreyoshi Kurahara and written by Nobuo Yamada. It is based on the bestselling memoir of the same name by Yoshimi Ishikawa, first published in 1988 by Hayakawa Publishing. The story follows two Japanese brothers who immigrate to rural California in the 1960s and start a strawberry farm.

As a Japanese-American co-production, Strawberry Road features a multi-national cast and crew, including several Japanese-American actors. It stars Japanese actor Ken Matsudaira in the lead role, alongside Mako, Toshiro Mifune, Mariska Hargitay and Tamotsu Ishibashi, with a cameo appearance by Pat Morita. Toho released the film theatrically on April 27, 1991, in Japan. Fred Karlin composed the film's score.

== Plot ==
In 1965, before Japan has achieved economic miracle status and at the height of the Vietnam War, Hisa Ishii (Ken Matsudaira) emigrates to the Pomona Valley in search of the American Dream. He quickly gets a job at the large farm of Japanese-American Frank Machida (Mako). Frank is a Nisei who was interned in a camp during World War II. He employs several undocumented immigrants from Mexico and Japan. Hisa is troubled by the isolation he feels amidst the intense heat and hard work. He marries, but his American wife leaves because she cannot live on the farm with him. Hisa is overcome with loneliness, so he calls his younger brother, Akira (Tamotsu Ishibashi), and asks if he would be willing to join him in America. Akira accepts Hisa's proposition. They obtain a green card for Akira, though officially his immigration status is nebulous. Arriving in America, Akira plans to attend a local high school to improve his English and then proceed to college, all while working on the farm with his brother to earn his keep.

After much toil, Hisa finally saves up the money to acquire his own plot of land. He develops it, envisioning a bright future as a strawberry farmer. But Akira faces difficulties with farm work. He worries that he will become like the local homeless "blanket man" (Norihei Miki) who wanders the area. The old man had emigrated to America just like the Ishii brothers, but found only loneliness, moving from one place to another in search of work with only a blanket as his fortune. One day, the lonely old man suddenly reunites with his long-lost younger brother (Pat Morita), though his younger brother only speaks broken Japanese. He wants his older brother to live with him, but the old man is proud and wants to continue looking for work. Eventually, the old man relents and goes with his brother.

Meanwhile, Hisa, who continues to develop his nascent strawberry farm, is visited by his friend Akiko (Mari Natsuki) from his hometown, accompanied by an Italian-American woman named Jill (Mariska Hargitay). As love blossoms between Hisa and Jill, Akira meets and falls for an older married Japanese woman named Naoko (Junko Sakurada). Hisa manages to grow a large crop of strawberries, despite hindrances by the immigration bureau and fickle weather. Hisa grows strong as an American farmer, while Akira comes of age, learns about love and heartbreak, and gets accepted to an American university.

Four years after emigrating to America, having finally achieved his dream, Hisa proposes to Jill. She accepts his proposal. With the blessings of their family members, many of whom remember times of racism and war, Hisa and Jill wed and give their marriage vows. After the ceremony, they make their way down the strawberry road, bathed in sunlight.

== Cast ==
- Ken Matsudaira as Hisa Ishii
- Mako as Frank Machida
- Mariska Hargitay as Jill Banner
- Toshiro Mifune as Taoka
- Tamotsu Ishibashi as Akira Ishii
- Art Metrano as Jill’s father
- Norihei Miki as Old man on hill
- Pat Morita as Old man's brother (credited as Noriyuki 'Pat' Morita)
- Mao Daichi as Daughter of old man's brother
- Junko Sakurada as Naoko
- Mari Natsuki as Akiko
- Shigehide Kawahira as George Noda
- Jim Ishida as Pete
- Rocky Aoki as Rocky Aota
- Victoria Gallegos as Maria
- Julia Buis as Student journalist (uncredited)
- Dennis Falt as Farmer (uncredited)
- Mieko Harada
- Diane Cary

== Background ==
Ishikawa's story was originally published in serialized monthly format from April 7 to December 22, 1987. These installments were then collected and published in two volumes by Hayakawa Publishing in 1988. The two-volume novel was a bestseller in Japan. It was first published in the English language (translated by Eve Zimmerman) in 1991, the year of the film's release.

For his work on the novel, Ishikawa received the 20th Sōichi Ōya Nonfiction Award in 1989. He wrote two sequels: Strawberry Road Part II: Strawberry Boy (1990) and Strawberry Road Part III: Garden Boy (1994), neither of which were adapted into films.

== Production ==
The film's production office was located in Monterey, California. Shooting locations included Salinas, the Salinas Valley and San Juan Bautista.

Editor Akira Suzuki had worked with director Kurahara on multiple prior productions, including the films I Am Waiting, Sunset, Sunrise, The Glacier Fox, Antarctica and Umi e, See You. Additionally, co-producer Junichi Mimura had served as assistant director on The Glacier Fox and writer of Elephant Story, and screenwriter Nobuo Yamada had written several earlier Kurahara films, including Safari 5000, Sunset, Sunrise and Two in the Amsterdam Rain.

== Music ==
American composer Fred Karlin created the score for Strawberry Road. Its theme songs, "Just a Dream Away" and "You Are My Home", were sung in the English language by Yukiko Haneda.

== Release ==
Strawberry Road was theatrically released by Toho on April 27, 1991, in Japan.

The film was released on VHS and LaserDisc by Pony Canyon, but it has not been distributed on another form of physical media since.
