= Elephant Story =

- Film poster
- Directed by: Koreyoshi Kurahara; Hino Narimichi; Koretsugu Kurahara
- Screenplay by: Junichi Mimura
- Produced by: Terumasa Yamashita
- Narrated by: Eiji Okada
- Cinematography: Masao Tochizawa; Sadanori Shibata; Yoshio Mamiya
- Edited by: Akira Suzuki
- Music by: Makoto Kawaguchi; Ryudo Uzaki
- Production companies: Nippon Television; Toho-Towa
- Distributed by: Toho-Towa
- Release date: March 20, 1980 (Japan)
- Running time: 113 minutes
- Country: Japan

Elephant Story (Japanese: 象物語, Hepburn: Zou monogatari) is a 1980 Japanese nature documentary co-directed by Koreyoshi Kurahara, his brother Koretsugu Kurahara and Hino Narimichi, and written by Junichi Mimura. A co-production between Nippon Television and Toho-Towa, it was theatrically released in Japan on March 20, 1980. The film depicts the lives of a family of African elephants, including an older elephant protecting his younger brother from poachers in the Kenyan savanna, after their mother dies of illness.

Elephant Story was one of three animal films that Koreyoshi Kurahara took part in directing. The others were 1978's The Glacier Fox (キタキツネ物語, Kita-kitsune monogatari) and the 1983 blockbuster Antarctica (南極物語, Nankyoku monogatari).

== Premise ==
Elephant Story traces seven years in the lives of its elephant protagonists. Kenya is a mother elephant in Africa with four children: her eldest son Muchanga, 12 years old, her second son Tanza, 9 years old, her eldest daughter Sabang, 6 years old, and her youngest son Totom, 3 years old. She is also pregnant with a fifth child. Soon the dry season arrives, necessitating a search for water and sustenance. After a long journey, Kenya and her children locate a watering hole.

Having reached their destination, Muchanga prepares to undergo a coming-of-age ceremony. After completing the ceremony and leaving his family, he will join a group of adult male elephants. However, before he can complete this process, Muchanga is attacked by poachers and separated from his kin. He is injured, but his wounds are quickly treated by a ranger.

During a rare annular eclipse, Kenya gives birth to another boy, Tamtam. Three days after birth, Tamtam learns to walk, but he relies entirely on his mother's milk for nutrition. It will take three to four years for him to be weaned. However, one week after Tamtam is born, Kenya falls ill. She is no longer capable of producing milk. Realizing that she doesn't have much time left, Kenya leaves her baby. Soon after, she dies. As Tamtam searches for Kenya, another elephant who lost her baby to stillbirth becomes Tamtam's surrogate mother. Together with his new mother, Tamtam and his siblings join a herd.

As the dry season spreads through the savanna, the herd begins to move. Thus Tamtam sets off on his first migration, reuniting with his brother Muchanga along the way. Muchanga, Tamtam, their siblings and their friends must continue their journey to more hospitable locales, all while braving poachers and the forces of nature.

== Production ==
Due to the length, scope and international nature of the production, it was shot by three directors, as well as three separate cinematographers: Masao Tochizawa, Sadanori Shibata and Yoshio Mamiya. Tochizawa and Mamiya had previously worked with Koreyoshi Kurahara on The Glacier Fox.

Elephant Story was the only directorial collaboration between Koreyoshi Kurahara and his brother Koretsugu. Other crew members were more frequent collaborators of the director. For example, editor Akira Suzuki worked with Kurahara on all three of his nature films. Narrator Eiji Okada starred in several Kurahara films and also served as narrator for his 1978 documentary The Glacier Fox. In addition, the film's screenwriter, Junichi Mimura, had earlier served as assistant director on The Glacier Fox, and would later co-produce Strawberry Road for the director. Co-composer Ryudo Uzaki would also work again with Kurahara, on 1988's Umi e, See You.

This is one of three at least partially Africa-set films made by Kurahara, the other two being Safari 5000 and Umi e, See You.

== Music ==
The film's score was co-composed by Makoto Kawaguchi and Ryudo Uzaki. Kawaguchi created the orchestral score, while Uzaki composed the songs. The orchestral component was performed by the Tokyo Symphony Orchestra and conducted by Hiroshi Kumagai, while the songs feature Japanese pop star Naomi Chiaki as a vocalist. There are two theme songs on the soundtrack: "Kaze no Daichi no Komoriuta" (lit. "Lullaby of the Land of the Wind", featuring Japanese rock band SHŌGUN as the backing band) and "African Night", both sung by Chiaki, with lyrics by Yoko Aki and composition by Ryudo Uzaki. Both tracks were also recorded by Jun Mayuzumi and released as a seven-inch single on February 25, 1980. The soundtrack was released on the same day by CBS/Sony, a month ahead of the film's premiere. It was distributed on audiocassette, CD and vinyl formats.

All music is composed by Makoto Kawaguchi and Ryudo Uzaki unless otherwise noted:

No.	Title	Writer(s)	Vocals	Length
1.	"Daishizen no Theme/Theme of Nature (Short Version)"	Makoto Kawaguchi		1:39
2.	"Savannah no Theme/Theme of the Savanna"	Kawaguchi		1:49
3.	"Kanki no Savannah/Savanna in the Dry Season"	Kawaguchi		2:03
4.	"Muchanga no Tabidachi/Muchanga's Departure"	Kawaguchi		1:47
5.	"Tamtam Tanjou/The Birth of Tamtam"	Kawaguchi		2:42
6.	"Lullaby of the Land of the Wind (Theme of Africa)"	Ryudo Uzaki, Yoko Aki	Naomi Chiaki	4:02
7.	"Tamtam Sanka/Tamtam Hymn"	Kawaguchi		2:39
8.	"Daishizen no Theme/Theme of Nature"	Kawaguchi		3:57
9.	"Kenya to Tamtam no Saikai/Kenya and Tamtam's Reunion"	Kawaguchi		2:02
10.	"Wagako no Ashita/My Child's Tomorrow"	Kawaguchi		3:53
11.	"African Night"	Uzaki, Aki	Chiaki	4:18
12.	"Kenya no Shi/Kenya's Death"	Kawaguchi		2:17
13.	"Requiem"	Kawaguchi		1:54
14.	"Shougai no Tabi/A Lifetime Journey"	Kawaguchi		3:46
Total length:				38:48

== Release ==
Elephant Story was theatrically released in Japan on March 20, 1980 by Toho-Towa. In some locations, it was presented as a double feature with the anime film Phoenix 2772.

The film was later released on VHS, but it has never been distributed on another physical format.
