= Sunset, Sunrise (1973 film) =

Japanese road movie

- Film poster
- Directed by: Koreyoshi Kurahara
- Screenplay by: Koreyoshi Kurahara; Nobuo Yamada
- Produced by: Yutaka Okada
- Starring: Rosemary Dexter; Glenn H. Neighbour; Takeshi Ôbayashi; Rose Ogawa
- Cinematography: Yonezô Maeda; Yoshihiro Yamazaki; Masahiro Tanaka; Koichi Suzuki
- Edited by: Akira Suzuki
- Music by: Nino Rota
- Production company: Nikkatsu
- Distributed by: Nikkatsu
- Release date: April 28, 1973 (Japan)
- Running time: 139 minutes
- Country: Japan
- Languages: Japanese; English; Italian; French

Sunset, Sunrise (Japanese: 陽は沈み陽は昇る, Hepburn: Hi wa shizumi, hi wa noboru; lit. The Sun Sets, the Sun Rises) is a 1973 Japanese drama film directed by Koreyoshi Kurahara and co-written by Kurahara and Nobuo Yamada. It is a hippie road movie epic, chronicling the trek that a handful of people take to reach Kathmandu, the capital of Nepal. The film was produced as a commemorative work in Nikkatsu's 60th anniversary slate. It is also considered to be part of their Roman Porno line.

As with many of Kurahara's films, it stars an international cast. This includes Rosemary Dexter in one of her final performances, Glenn H. Neighbour, Takeshi Ôbayashi (a frequent collaborator of Kurahara's) and Rose Ogawa. Nikkatsu theatrically released the film on April 28, 1973, in Japan. Italian composer Nino Rota created the film's score.

== Premise ==
Three young people, each with tragedy and hardship in their pasts, meet by chance on a 15,000-kilometer journey along a Silk Road route to Kathmandu, Nepal. Each hopes to achieve enlightenment, stability and redemption at their various destinations. Burning with passion and the vitality of youth, they make their trek via land and sea, on foot, motorcycle, ship and camel.

== Plot ==
Nishi (Takeshi Ôbayashi) is a young Japanese racer participating in the 24 Hours of Le Mans. Despite his determination, he loses the race. Upon arrival back at his Paris hotel, Nishi's girlfriend Yuko (Rose Ogawa) has sex with him, trying to help him forget his failure. Yuko is leaving for Japan in a few days, but Nishi says he does not want to return to his home country right away. After parting ways with Yuko at Orly Airport, Nishi decides to go on an impromptu trip to the Middle East, with only his beloved Kawasaki 500 motorcycle in tow.

Simultaneously, at a Parisian strip club, Italian stripper Tina (Rosemary Dexter) is performing her last show. Tina has chosen to marry a Muslim man living in Afghanistan, sacrificing her relationship with her family in the process. She leaves for Afghanistan in a used Citroën.

Meanwhile, in his Paris apartment, rich kid Paul (Glenn H. Neighbour), a hippie fleeing from his native America, plans a trip to Kathmandu. He fantasizes about achieving inner peace there. Paul takes off on his Yamaha TX750.

In Istanbul, Nishi meets Paul by chance at a restaurant full of fellow hippies. The two hit it off immediately and decide to travel together. Shortly afterwards, they meet Tina on the deck of a ferry. After getting off the ferry, they part ways, but meet once again by chance in the Turkish capital city of Ankara. Believing that fate has connected them, the three continue traveling together. In their travels, Nishi and Paul both fall for Tina. Despite this romantic rivalry, Tina remains faithful to her husband in Afghanistan.

Later, Nishi and Paul challenge each other to a motorcycle race, which ends in a draw. Tina is initially angry when she finds out about their race, believing it to be risky and dangerous. However, as they enter Afghanistan and get closer to Tina's destination, she forgives them. As their parting approaches, the men throw a farewell party for Tina. They reconcile their romantic feelings for her, choosing to be friends instead. Then, at the fork in the road, the men go left, while Tina heads right.

While crossing the arid landscape, Tina's car gets stuck in the sand. Tired and thirsty, she manages to find drinking water at an oasis. However, as she is drinking, she is ambushed by a group of local men. Though Tina tries to escape, the men catch up and gang rape her. Afterwards, Tina sets her car on fire and wanders into the desert.

Nishi and Paul come across an old nomad and his flock of sheep. The nomad invites them into his tent. When he raises the curtain, the men see Tina lying inside, exhausted and traumatized. Tina informs them of what happened. Expecting another attack, the three begin practicing with rifles provided by the nomad, hoping to get revenge for Tina in the process. However, after waiting several days, their enemies do not appear. Nishi, Paul and Tina assume the worst is over, and bury their guns in the sand before setting off once more. Yet as soon as they leave the nomad's land, a group of men on camels attack them. The three travelers flee through the desert. Despite suffering gunshot wounds, they manage to escape with their lives, although their vengeance is unfulfilled.

The trio passes through New Delhi en route to Varanasi. However, Tina, suffering from her injuries and heat stroke, rolls off the back seat of Nishi's bike. The men look for water and assistance, but are unable to find any. As her consciousness fades, Tina tells Nishi and Paul, "I am happy. You've taught me so many things." Tina dies, leaving Nishi and Paul standing in a daze in front of her body. They place Tina atop a pile of firewood and light the makeshift funeral pyre. Nishi and Paul cry as they watch her body burn, remembering moments from their journey together.

As the sun sets on the Ganges, Nishi heads for Calcutta (and then back to Japan), and Paul to Kathmandu. They ride off, their silhouettes framed by the sun, as they finally part ways and their paths diverge.

== Cast ==
- Rosemary Dexter as Tina
- Glenn H. Neighbour as Paul
- Takeshi Ôbayashi as Nishi
- Rose Ogawa as Yuko

== Production ==
Kurahara had started his career at Nikkatsu, making several successful Sun Tribe, crime and drama films for the studio. By 1971, the popularity of television had taken a toll on the Japanese film industry. In order to remain profitable, Nikkatsu turned to the production of Roman Pornos. Many stars and directors left the company over this change in focus. Though his time as a regular director with Nikkatsu had already come to an end, Kurahara chose to continue working for the studio as a freelancer, alongside other directors like Yasuharu Hasebe, Keiichi Ozawa and Shōgorō Nishimura. However, after the production of Sunset, Sunrise, he was fired and left Nikkatsu permanently, instead making films for such studios as Toei and Toho.

Sunset, Sunrise was an Italian-Japanese co-production. Shooting took place on-location throughout Europe (including various locations in Italy and Greece, as well as the city of Paris), the West Asian nations of Turkey and Iran, Central Asia (including Afghanistan) and South Asia (including Pakistan and India). Due to the production's scope, it was shot by four cinematographers: Yonezô Maeda, Yoshihiro Yamazaki, Masahiro Tanaka and Koichi Suzuki.

Co-screenwriter Nobuo Yamada collaborated with Kurahara multiple times, earlier on Safari 5000 (1969), and later with Two in the Amsterdam Rain (1975) and Strawberry Road (1991). Editor Akira Suzuki was also a frequent collaborator of the director, having worked with him since the 1957 production of I Am Waiting.

At the time of the film's premiere, the Afghan embassy complained of a rape scene involving Muslim characters. This scene was re-edited prior to the film's theatrical release.

== Music ==
The film's score was composed by Nino Rota. It is a combination of European sensibilities, folk music instrumentation and Tibetan influences. Rota worked on Sunset, Sunrise in-between the first two Godfather films. Rota's score was arranged and conducted by Gino Marinuzzi Jr. and performed by the Rome Philharmonic Orchestra, with the recording produced by director Kurahara. The original LP was released in 1973 by Canyon Records. Canyon's LP featured dialogue and sound effects mixed in with the score. It was later re-released on November 8, 2019, as a limited edition CD by Quartet Records (without dialogue and sound effects). Quartet's release includes two bonus tracks, which are concert arrangements of the main theme. The first bonus track was conducted by Carlo Savina, and the second was taken from a 1977 live recording in Japan conducted by Rota himself.

Additionally, a seven-inch tie-in single was created for the film. The self-titled track ("Sunset, Sunrise"; "Hi wa Shizumi, Hi wa Noboru") was composed by Rota and arranged by Kenichiro Morioka, with lyrics by Yasui Kazumi and vocals by Akira Fuse, a popular singer at the time. Its B-side was "Kane wa Naru", also known as "The Bell Rings". This single was released by King Records on April 20, 1973, eight days ahead of the film's premiere. Despite being featured in the film itself, the single has never been included on any of the official soundtrack releases.

All music is composed by Nino Rota:

No.	Title	Length
1.	"Sunset Sunrise (tema principale)"	1:30
2.	"Speranza (Tema di Tina)"	3:07
3.	"Arrivederci Europa!"	0:34
4.	"Separazione à Parigi"	1:01
5.	"Fiamma ardente"	2:50
6.	"Il ricordo di Tina"	1:55
7.	"La strada per Kathmandu"	3:48
8.	"Altro ricordo di Tina"	1:29
9.	"Tema dell’affondamento del sole"	3:57
10.	"L’alba di Messied"	0:55
11.	"Afghanistan"	0:59
12.	"Il réquiem di Tina"	4:17
13.	"Il sole tramonte, il sole sorge"	2:22
14.	"Sunset Sunrise (tema principale)"	2:56
15.	"Sunset Sunrise (Live concert in Japan)"	2:47
Total length:		34:27

== Release ==
Sunset, Sunrise was theatrically released by Nikkatsu on April 28, 1973, in Japan. The film was a failure at the box office. Despite this and the fact that it has never been released to home video or streaming, Sunset, Sunrise has seen occasional theatrical re-releases in recent years. In 2017, the Cine Nouveau theater of Osaka Prefecture included the film as part of a retrospective lineup commemorating Kurahara's 90th birthday. Additionally, the Laputa Asagaya theater of Tokyo screened the film from October 24 to October 30, 2021.
