= Haru no Kane =

- Film poster
- Directed by: Koreyoshi Kurahara
- Screenplay by: Kôji Takada
- Based on: Haru no Kane by Masaaki Tachihara
- Produced by: Hitoshi Ogura
- Starring: Kin'ya Kitaōji; Yoshiko Mita; Yūko Kotegawa; Eiji Okada; Kyōko Kishida
- Cinematography: Akira Shiizuka
- Edited by: Akira Suzuki
- Music by: Joe Hisaishi
- Production company: Toho
- Distributed by: Toho
- Release date: November 9, 1985 (Japan)
- Running time: 128 minutes
- Country: Japan
- Language: Japanese

Haru no Kane (Japanese: 春の鐘), also known as Spring Bell, is a 1985 Japanese romantic drama film directed by Koreyoshi Kurahara and written by Kôji Takada. It was adapted from a novel of the same name by Masaaki Tachihara, first published in 1978 by Shinchosha. The film's story concerns an extramarital affair and its impact on the marriage of an art museum director and his wife. It stars Kin'ya Kitaōji and Yoshiko Mita in the lead roles. Toho released Haru no Kane theatrically on November 9, 1985, in Japan. Joe Hisaishi, credited onscreen as "Yuzuru Hisaishi", composed the film's score.

== Premise ==
Rokuheita Narumi and his wife Noriko spend their lives separated. Soon they start looking for love elsewhere.

== Plot ==
Rokuheita Narumi (Kin'ya Kitaōji) achieves acclaim as the curator of a Nara museum of ancient Oriental pottery. He desires to move his family with him to Nara. However, his wife Noriko (Yoshiko Mita) does not wish to leave Tokyo. The two continue to live separately. As they drift further apart, Noriko feels neglected by her husband and stressed by her role as sole caretaker of their child. Secretly she undertakes an affair with a local doctor, Katsumori (Akira Nakao), though their relationship is passionless. In Nara, Rokuheita hires a devoted assistant, Tae Ishimoto (Yūko Kotegawa), a divorcée who calls him sensei. They, too, begin an affair. When Rokuheita arrives back in Tokyo to visit his family, he quickly discovers Noriko’s deception. However, he feels he cannot divorce her for the sake of their child, and also due to his own affair. He considers forgiving her. Meanwhile Tae, cast out by her mother-in-law, seeks to liberate herself, and must come to terms with her relationship to Rokuheita. Simultaneously, Noriko realizes she still loves her husband and desperately tries to win back his affections.

== Cast ==
- Kin'ya Kitaōji as Rokuheita Narumi
- Yoshiko Mita as Noriko Narumi
- Yūko Kotegawa as Tae Ishimoto
- Akira Nakao as Maki Katsumori
- Shinsuke Ashida as Toichiro Miyake
- Eiji Okada as Hachiro Ishimoto
- Kyōko Kishida as Fusako Ishimoto
- Mariko Kaga as Sanae Ishiwata
- Toshiya Fujita as Tomio Murata
- Tomoko Naraoka as Katsuko Naganuma
- Kazuko Shirakawa as Toyoko
- Ryōko Tateishi as Shizuko Urakami
- Ryuzo Tanaka as Hisaichi Amano
- Sumie Sasaki as Rise Amano
- Takeshi Ôbayashi as Yuji Imura
- Aoi Nakajima as Kazuyo
- Shôichirô Sakata as Hiroyoshi Kiki (also known as Masahiko Sakata)
- Noriko Suzukawa as Sumiko Maekawa
- Michiko Miyoshi as Housekeeper

== Production ==
Cinematographer Akira Shiizuka and editor Akira Suzuki had worked with director Kurahara on his previous films Antarctica and The Glacier Fox.

The production originally cast Ken Ogata as Rokuheita and Ayumi Ishida as Noriko, but Ogata insisted on "changing the role to a male-oriented film with Narumi [Rokuheita] at the center". Creative disagreements ensued, and the pair dropped out. They were replaced by Kin’ya Kitaōji and Yoshiko Mita, respectively. Mita was persuaded when Kurahara told her, "If you don't appear in this film, I won't do this film."

Haru no Kane originally featured a nude scene with Yūko Kotegawa’s character. She was nervous about the scene, but accepted the role in order to work with Kurahara. However, during editing, Kurahara determined that the scene was too long and cut most of Kotegawa’s nudity from the film.

== Release ==
Haru no Kane was theatrically released by Toho on November 9, 1985, in Japan.

== Awards and nominations ==
10th Hochi Film Award

- Won: Best Actor - Kin'ya Kitaōji (also awarded for his performance in Fire Festival)

9th Japan Academy Film Prize

- Won: Best Supporting Actress - Yoshiko Mita
