= A Colt Is My Passport (upcoming film) =

British/American action film

- Directed by: Gareth Evans
- Screenplay by: Chris Webb
- Based on: A Colt Is My Passport (1967 film) by; Shūichi Nagahara; Nobuo Yamada; Tobosha (novel) by Shinji Fujiwara
- Produced by: Gareth Evans; Ed Talfan
- Starring: Sope Dirisu; Tim Roth; Jack Reynor; Lucy Boynton; Burn Gorman
- Cinematography: Sam Thomas
- Edited by: Urien Deiniol
- Production companies: Orion Pictures; Severn Screen; One More One Productions
- Distributed by: Amazon MGM Studios
- Countries: United States; United Kingdom
- Language: English

A Colt Is My Passport is an upcoming action film directed and produced by Gareth Evans, and starring Sope Dirisu, Tim Roth, Jack Reynor, Lucy Boynton, and Burn Gorman. It is an English-language remake of the 1967 Japanese film, in turn based on the Shinji Fujiwara novel Tobosha, with the setting moved to 1970s America. It is from Amazon MGM Studios and Orion Pictures.

== Premise ==
A veteran of the Vietnam War goes on the run in 1970s Detroit after assassinating a mob boss.

== Cast ==
- Sope Dirisu
- Tim Roth
- Jack Reynor
- Lucy Boynton
- Victor Alli
- Ewan Mitchell
- Burn Gorman
- Noah Taylor
- Amilcar Franco
- Charlie Ellerton
- Donald Sage Mackay

== Production ==
The film is directed by Gareth Evans and is a remake of the 1967 Takashi Nomura film, A Colt Is My Passport, which Evans previously spoke warmly about, introducing a screening of the film at the L'Etrange Festival in 2023. The original film was itself adapted from the novel Tobosha by Shinji Fujihara. It is written by Chris Webb, a previous collaborator with Evans, and produced by Ed Talfan for Severn Screen and Evans for One More One Productions. It is from Amazon MGM Studios and Orion Pictures.

The cast is led by Ṣọpẹ́ Dìrísù, Tim Roth, Jack Reynor, and Lucy Boynton and also includes Victor Alli, Ewan Mitchell, Burn Gorman and Noah Taylor.

Principal photography took place in Wales, with filming locations including Cardiff, and was completed by September 2025.
