= List of Hyakka Ryōran Samurai Girls episodes =

The first DVD/Blu-ray volume of Hyakka Ryōran: Samurai Girls released by Media Factory on November 25, 2010

Hyakka Ryōran: Samurai Girls is a 2010 anime television series based on the light novels written by Akira Suzuki and illustrated by Niθ, published by Hobby Japan. Produced by ARMS, the series is directed by KOBUN; series composition by Ryunosuke Kingetsu; music by Tatsuya Kato; produced by Hisato Usui, Ryūji Sekine, Shinsaku Tanaka, and Takuro Hatakeyama; character designs by Tsutomu Miyazawa; with narration in early episodes provided by Fumihiko Tachiki. The series takes place in Great Japan, an alternate version of Japan where the Tokugawa shogunate remained active and has remained isolated from the rest of the world, and the story centers on Muneakira Yagyu, a young man attending Buou Academic School, an academy located at the base of Mount Fuji where elite nobles train to become samurai warriors. His life takes a sudden turn when he meets Jubei Yagyu, a mysterious girl who fell from the sky naked who later becomes his first "Master Samurai" after receiving a kiss from her.

Twelve episodes aired on Chiba TV and TV Kanagawa between October 4 and December 20, 2010, with later broadcasts on TV Saitama, Tokyo MX, TV Aichi, Sun Television, and AT-X. A preview of the first episode aired on Tokyo MX on September 4, 2010, prior to the official airing. Simulcasts were provided in North America by Anime Network on their video portal for their paid subscribers, and in Australia and New Zealand by Madman Entertainment. Six DVD and Blu-ray volumes were released by Media Factory between November 25, 2010, and April 28, 2011, each containing an OVA short called Hyakka Ryōran Samurai Girls: Blushing Maidens in the Pact (百花繚乱 サムライガールズ 〜乙女♥嬉し恥ずかし将士の契り〜, Hyakka Ryōran Samurai Gāruzu ~Otome Ureshi Hazukashi Shōshi no Chigiri~) and a voiced 4-koma illustrated by Chiruo Kazahana. A Blu-ray box set is scheduled for release on February 27, 2013.

Samurai Girls is licensed in North America by Sentai Filmworks, and distributor Section23 Films released the series with an English dub (produced by Seraphim Digital) on August 23, 2011, on DVD and Blu-ray. The anime is licensed in Australia and New Zealand by Madman Entertainment, and in the United Kingdom by Manga Entertainment. The English dub of the anime premiered on Anime Network's video portal on June 23, 2011.

The opening theme for the series is "Last vision for last" by Faylan, while the ending theme is "Koi ni Sesse Tooryanse" (恋にせっせ通りゃんせ) by Aoi Yūki, Minako Kotobuki, and Rie Kugimiya, the voices for Jubei Yagyu, Sen Tokugawa, and Yukimura Sanada, respectively.

A second anime season, titled Hyakka Ryōran: Samurai Bride (百花繚乱 サムライブライド, Hyakka Ryōran Samurai Buraido), was announced on the twelfth volume of the light novels. The second season is directed by KOBU; series composed by Satoru Nishizono; music by Tatsuya Kato; produced by Makoto Ito, Osamu Koshinaka, Ryūji Sekine, and Takuro Hatakeyama; and character designs by Tsutomu Miyazawa. Twelve episodes aired on AT-X from April 5 to June 21, 2013, with later broadcasts on Tokyo MX, TV Aichi, BS11, Chiba TV, and Sun Television.

== Series overview ==
Season	Episodes	Originally released	
Season	Episodes	First released	Last released
1	12	September 4, 2010	December 20, 2010
2	12	April 5, 2013	June 21, 2013

== Episode list ==
=== Season 1 (2010) ===
No.	Title	Original release date
1	"The First Kiss"; Transliteration: "Hajimete no Chū" (Japanese: はじめての忠)	September 4, 2010 (pre-release); October 4, 2010 (TV)
Yagyu Muneakira arrived at Buou Academy to take care of the recently abandoned Shinkage Dojo. There, he met Yukimura and Matabei, students from the Toyotomi faction, who proclaimed that they were on a secret mission to oust the Tokugawa Shogunate's influence over the student body. Soon after, a group of assailants led by Hanzo Hattori ambushed them, intending to seize and bring them to the Tokugawas. Unable to convince Hanzo, Muneakira helped Yukimura and Matabei escape via a hidden exit. The enemy caught up with them near a bridge over a river, but Muneakira pledged to fight and protect both out of his personal samurai ethics. At the nick of time, a bright light flashed in the sky, followed by a naked young girl falling on Muneakira's arms. She addressed him as "onii-chan" and kissed him, causing a blast of white light. The girl transformed to a dual-wielding Master Samurai, named Yagyu Jubei.
2	"Naked Body Reincarnation"; Transliteration: "Ratai Tenshō" (Japanese: 裸体転生)	October 11, 2010
Jubei overpowered Hanzo in her Master Samurai form. Black chains formed around Muneakira's body and prevented him from moving. Just as Jubei was about to cut Hanzo down, Muneakira's frustrated scream reverted her back as she fell down and fainted. Sen Tokugawa arrived and brought everyone to the Academy complex. While Muneakira, Yukimura, and Matabei was being interrogated, Jubei awakens, oblivious to her fighting Hanzo a few hours before. Hanzo failed to detect the extraordinary power level from Jubei, as she did while fighting the Master Samurai form. The present Jubei also displayed a childish and innocent behavior, very unlike the stern and confident Jubei that almost killed Hanzo. Yukimura suggested to search Jubei's body for the purported Master Samurai mark, and Muneakira inadvertently discovered it on her breast.
3	"The Identity of the Master Samurai"; Transliteration: "Masutā Samurai no Shōtai" (Japanese: 剣姫の正体)	October 18, 2010
Everyone confirmed that Jubei was indeed a Master Samurai. Sen let Yukimura and Matabei off, on the condition that they leave the dojo. Afterwards, Sen moved her belongings to the dojo and began living there together with Muneakira, Jubei, and Hanzo. Jealous and enraged by Jubei's closeness with Muneakira, Sen's anger caused Jubei to have a mental breakdown where she begged to not be left alone again. After tucking Jubei to sleep, Muneakira and Sen discussed about a series of missing schoolgirls from the school, dubbed the "spirited away incidents". Jubei had a nightmare concerning the circumstances of her pasts, and kissed Muneakira when the latter approached her. She transformed to her Master Samurai form again, but the "other Jubei" persona also took over and defeated Sen and Hanzo. Yukimura and Matabei arrived to seal Jubei with Yukimura's evil-sealing ward, but were astonished to find that there were no evil in her. Matabei used her body to protect Yukimura. Seeing Sen arriving to help those who should have been her enemies, Jubei was impressed and transformed back to her normal form and personality.
4	"Hey, Give me a Kiss!"; Transliteration: "Nee, Chū Shite yo?" (Japanese: ねえ忠してよ?)	October 25, 2010
Sen reasoned that Jubei was harmless as long as she does not kiss Muneakira. Yukimura on the other hand opined that Muneakira's power would be a waste if not taken advantage of. She volunteered to be a test subject, but Sen objected and won't allow anyone to kiss Muneakira. Yukimura's multiple attempts to kiss Muneakira was thwarted by Sen and Hanzo. In her last effort, Matabei laced Sen and Hanzo's tea with sleeping powders and Yukimura approached Muneakira in the bath. Sen, half-asleep and dizzy, appeared and attacked both in rage, sending them flying through the wall, after which Yukimura and Muneakira accidentally kissed. Yukimura was transformed into a Master Samurai. Unable to control her newfound wind-based powers, however, she blew everyone away.
5	"Here Comes the Warrior of Love!"; Transliteration: "Ai no Senshi, Tōjō" (Japanese: 愛の戦士、登場)	November 1, 2010
Kanetsugu Naoe appeared on the dojo. She was commanded to spy the dojo for Yoshihiko Tokugawa, Sen's older brother and head of the Student Body, while posing as Yukimura's old friend, but her past grudges with Yukimura got her blown away. Sen contemplated kissing Muneakira while he discovered the link between the "spirited away" missing girl incidents. Yukimura shared her concerns with Muneakira, but was interrupted by Kanetsugu, who accused Muneakira of being a sleazy womanizer who took advantage of the woman around him. Muneakira refused to fight back and let Kanetsugu attack him as atonement for him ignoring Yukimura's feelings for him. Sen voiced her true feelings for Muneakira, and she kissed Muneakira, creating a contract samurai-general contract and transformed her to a Master Samurai. The defeated Kanetsugu fled the dojo.
6	"The Sea Monster Attacks"; Transliteration: "Osoi Kuru, Umi no Kaibutsu" (Japanese: 襲い来る、海の怪物)	November 8, 2010
Believing that Yoshihiko is behind the spirited away incidents, Sen and Muneakira planned to travel to the Tokugawa vacation resort where an independent server may hold information they sought. Their attempt to go in secret was thwarted as they were discovered by Yukimura's alarm. Cornered, Sen lied that they were going on a vacation instead, and everyone went with them. Kanetsugu followed them to the resort and attempted to assassinate Muneakira. When she was cornered by the Master Samurais who found out, she unleashed a "secret weapon" given to her by Yoshihiko, which turned out to be a giant sea monster shikigami which turned on her and absorbed her into its body. Unable to defeat the monster as killing it would also mean killing Kanetsugu, they enlisted Jubei's Master Samurai help. Working together, they managed to destroy it and save Kanetsugu.
7	"The Shadow Over Great Japan"; Transliteration: "Dai Nippon o Ōu Kage" (Japanese: 大日本を覆う影)	November 15, 2010
Kanetsugu Naoe moved in to live in the dojo. Yukimura finished her analysis of the collected Tokugawa data. Hanzo had a recollection of her childhood past with Sen, where the latter's father instructed her to keep watch and befriend the Tokugawa Princess. She then ponders whether her role is still needed, now that Sen is a Master Samurai and surrounded by capable allies. At night, an invisible panther-like creature attacked the dojo. Hanzo was about to sacrifice herself to defeat it, before the combined force of Sen and Kanetsugu revealed the creature and defeated it. Princess and servant had a heartfelt moment as both strengthened their bond with each other.
8	"The Slave of the Kiss"; Transliteration: "Chū no Dorei" (Japanese: 忠の奴隷)	November 22, 2010
In light of recent events, and of the news of Yoshihiko's impending return to the Academy, Yukimura and Sen instructed Matabei, Hanzo, and Kanetsugu to kiss Muneakira, to form a General-Samurai contract and become Master Samurais. Jubei objected, opposing the notion that someone can kiss someone else without real feelings behind them. A ball of light appeared in the sky above the dojo and a naked girl fell to Muneakira's arms, much like Jubei before. The girl introduced herself as Yagyu Gisen, claimed that she had no memory of her past, and soon began showing a very perverted and sexualized side towards Muneakira, angering Yukimura and Sen. Gisen viewed Muneakira as her master, and all samurais were considered slaves to their general. Sen had an altercation with her in objection to this, but Gisen soon overpowered herby using Yagyu's swordless style while emanating a very Jubei-like aura, albeit white in color. Jubei interfered, briefly exhibiting the same power, before she convinced Gisen that a General-Samurai contract should be based on trust and bonding. The impressed Gisen reconciled with everyone and started calling Jubei "onee-sama".
9	"The Return of the General"; Transliteration: "Jeneraru no Kikan" (Japanese: 将(ジェネラル)の帰還)	November 29, 2010
Yoshihiko Tokugawa returned to Great Japan a week ahead of schedule while Kanetsugu, Hanzo, and Matabei still contemplate kissing Muneakira to unlock their Master Samurai powers. Gisen conversed with Muneakira alone, which eventually led to her using her hidden eye power to take control of Muneakira's mind when he refused her advances. Gisen used her control over Muneakira to aid her fight against Jubei, Hanzo, and Sen. She attempted to make Muneakira kiss Jubei to invalidate their previous Master Samurai contract and form a new one with her master, Amakusa Shiro. Yoshihiko appeared with Charles "Nia" d'Artagnan, who used her artificial Master Samurai powers to overwhelm Gisen, who then ran away. Everyone was taken hostage as Yoshihiko and Nia revealed the plans for Project Izanami, Yoshihiko's plan to create an army of Master Samurais for harvested Master Samurai genomes, of which Jubei had a true source of.
10	"The Prison of the Evil Eye"; Transliteration: "Magan no Rōgoku" (Japanese: 魔眼の牢獄)	December 6, 2010
Hanzo, Matabei, Yukimura and Kanetsugu escaped via a hidden passage leading to Yukimura's secret hideout. Yukimura used spiritual projection to contact Muneakira's mind in Gisen's "Prison of the Evil Eye". Unable to rescue Muneakira even with Sen's spiritual projection help, they decided to go to where his body is being kept inside the Buou Academy building. Succeeding in breaking in, Matabei, Kanetsugu, and Hanzo stayed behind to take care of the advancing enemy forces while Yukimura and Sen made it to the main facility where Muneakira and Jubei was being held. Yoshihiko then explained his motives as he ordered Nia to eliminate them, but she refuses. Hearing Sen's and Yukimura's encouraging voices, Muneakira freed himself from Gisen's control at the same time Jubei was released due to malfunction, and they kissed.
11	"The Samurai from France"; Transliteration: "Furansu kara Kita Samurai" (Japanese: 仏蘭西(フランス)から来たサムライ)	December 13, 2010
The conflicted Nia battled Jubei's Master Samurai form even though the Amakusa Shiro's threat is imminent. Deeply torubled by the useless fight, Muneakira finally broke free of the black chains that held him and acquired his true General powers. After briefly impressing Yoshihiko with his wisdom, green tentacles appeared all over the city and a sphere containing Gisen and the unborn Amakusa Shiro was formed on the sky. The Academy building was assaulted, and Nia sacrificed herself to protect Yoshihiko as everyone escaped. In a subconscious conversation with her Master Samurai personality, Jubei learned that forming a new contract with the now full-fledged General Muneakira will enable the Master Samurai personality to take over her body permanently, and consequently erase her incomplete, child-like personality forever.
12	"The Goodbye Kiss"; Transliteration: "Sayonara no Chū" (Japanese: さよならの忠)	December 20, 2010
Jubei made the complete contract with Muneakira. Hanzo, Matabei, and Kanetsugu stayed behind to protect the Academy students from Amakusa's tentacles as Jubei, Yukimura, and Sen went out to take on her. Jubei managed to get inside the sphere which held Amakusa and Gisen, but fell to the overwhelming power of the enemy. As Gisen attempted to suck Jubei's powers out to resurrect Amakusa, Yoshihiko's Izanami Master Samurai broke through the protective barriers and significantly weakened Amakusa's green tentacles. Nia was revealed to be resurrected by forming a true general-samurai contract with the reformed Yoshihiko, and together they helped the fight against Amakusa. Muneakira managed to contact Jubei, and both of her personality now awakened at the same time, eventually defeating Gisen by propelling both into outer space, sacrificing herself in the process. A week later, as everyone rebuilds the Academy city, Muneakira witnessed a ball of light in the sky, from which the resurrected Jubei fell to his arms and kissed him, mirroring the first time they met.

=== Season 2 (2013) ===
No. overall	No. in season	Title	Original release date
13	1	"True Shadow, Now Open"; Transliteration: "Shin'in, Kaimaku" (Japanese: 真陰、開幕)	April 5, 2013
Four mysterious shadows: Musashi Miyamoto, Kojiro Sasaki, Mataemon Araki, and Inshun Hozoin, revealed to be Dark Samurais, appear within a cemetery and are greeted by D'Artagnan who engages them in battle. Muneakira returns to the Yagyu Dojo from his training away only to find that the dojo has been turned into the Shinkage Maid Cafe (True Shadow Maid Cafe). Yukimura reveals that due to the Reiman Shock, the dojo had to make money or else it'd be repossessed. Kanetsugu is shown to have been sent out to the cemetery to hand out flyers where she meets the Dark Samurais and directs them to the dojo. The Dark Samurais skirmish against Muneakira, Yukimura and Sen; leaving Muneakira's General's powers sealed. Muneakira is given a month to bring back the Master Samurai Jubei or else his General powers will be destroyed. To the shock of everyone, Musashi returns the next day simply as a customer with an entirely different demeanor.
14	2	"Kiss, Again"; Transliteration: "Chū, Futatabi" (Japanese: 忠、ふたたび)	April 12, 2013
Yukimura's panties have been missing from the dojo ever since Muneakira came back, which led her and Sen to suspect him of stealing them. After a misunderstanding, it was revealed that a monkey named Sasuke, and old companion of Yukimura and Matabei's from Ueda, had been following them to the dojo and stole the panties to alleviate her loneliness. Translated by Jubei, who inexplicably was able to understand her, Sasuke told everyone that she was directed to the dojo by Inshun Hozoin, one of the Dark Samurais. Kanetsugu then argued that keeping Sasuke in the maid cafe will further hurt their finances. Sasuke attempted to leave the dojo in secret after hearing Yukimura agreeing with her but was found out. In the resulting altercation, Muneakira and Sasuke fell into the dojo pond and kissed by accident. Sasuke turned into a human girl with Master Samurai-power level, confirming that Muneakia still has his General powers. Afterwards, the Maid Cafe experienced a boom in sales with Sasuke as the new maid, much to Kanetsugu's dismay.
15	3	"Love and Kiss"; Transliteration: "Ai to Chū" (Japanese: 愛と忠)	April 19, 2013
Kanetsugu suggested that a competition between maids be held in the True Shadow maid cafe, with the maid earning the least getting kicked out of the dojo. Surprisingly, her continuous mishaps and mistakes put her own earnings below zero. Overhearing a conversation between Muneakira, Yukimura, and Sen at night, the depressed Kanetsugu decided to leave the dojo on her own. Sasuke tailed her, and left clues for others to follow. Meanwhile, Mataemon had been possessed by an unknown spirit, and she roamed the city looking for fights. She met Kanetsugu and Sasuke, the latter unable to defeat her even in her temporary Master Samurai Form. Kanetsugu stalled Mataemon while telling Sasuke to leave, which she did unwillingly. Sasuke found Muneakira and Jubei, who were also out looking. Mataemon defeated Kanetsugu and threw her to the river to dronw. Muneakira rescued her, applied CPPR, and in the process created a bond between him and Kanetsugu and kissed her, turning her into a Master Samurai. Kanetsugu's powerful hammer blow knocked Mataemon back to her sense. The rest of the girls caught up, and everyone agreed to bring Kanetsugu back home to the dojo.
16	4	"Bride of the General"; Transliteration: "Shō no Hanayome" (Japanese: 将の花嫁)	April 26, 2013
True Shadow Maid Cafe experienced a growing business. Yagyu Gisen suddenly appeared on the dojo and offered information about Samurai Bride, an apparently unique phenomenon that allows certain Master Samurais to gain exceptional powers. Unwilling to believe her, Muneakira and the samurais let Gisen stay in the dojo storeroom for the night while Jubei offered to keep watch. Over the night, Gisen requested to talk to Yukimura, Sen, Kanetsugu, and Jubei about Samurai Brides, giving them each a different fragmented method to achieve it. Hilarity ensued when the four attempted them, the resulting chaos caused the maid cafe to be closed for the day. Kojiro, jealous of Musashi's fondness of Jubei, went to search for the latter in the bamboo forests. Using her eye powers, she manipulated Jubei's mind and commanded her to jump off. Gisen rescued her in the nick of time and chased Kojiro away. Gisen then admitted to everyone that she didn't actually know how one produces a Samurai Bride, and was actually experimenting on the samurai girls to find out. She was about to leave before everyone convinced her to stay at the cafe, much to Jubei's delight. Muneakira opined correctly to Sen and Yukimura that Gisen might actually have lost her eye power, much like Jubei losing her Master Samurai form, and wondered if she's really looking for ways to regain it.
17	5	"Underworld Supremacy"; Transliteration: "Meido Sōha" (Japanese: 冥土争覇)	May 3, 2013
Under the blessings of Yoshihiko and in response to the growing maid cafe competition, Sen and Yukimura hosted a nationwide M-1 Grand Prix contest. The Dark Samurai surprisingly enters the contest as well, and they met the True Shadow maid cafe at the finals. Despite rigging the competitions in their favor, the heroines lost three out of the four games due to various mishaps and from underestimating the Dark Samurais' abilities. At the final game, Musashi fought Jubei in an "all-out sword battle", the former took care of all traps aimed at her. Sensing danger from Musashi gradually using the full extent on her powers on a seemingly helpless Jubei, Muneakira stepped in to stop the game, but Musashi punched him aside. Angered at this, a red aura emanates from Jubei and the two samurai girls unexpectedly went toe-to-toe on eual strengths before an explosion occurs. Musashi, satisfied with seeing Jubei finally showing a bit of the power she was looking for, withdrew from the battle and forfeited victory. True Shadow maid cafe won the contest, and Matabei managed to collect footages of the Dark Samurais' aura during their games.
18	6	"The Reputed Dandy Guest"; Transliteration: "Uwasa no Kabukimono" (Japanese: 噂の傾奇者)	May 10, 2013
The Dark Samurais were attacked by a weirdly-dressed woman, who ran off. Meanwhile, the True Shadow Maid cafe was closed once Yukimura determined they have saved enough to cover their debts. The group then shifted to focus on Ki training, based on analysis of Matabei's footages of the Dark Samurais. Kanetsugu, despite being present at the discussion leading to the decisions, were mad. She disturbed the Ki trainings by introducing several random obstructions which broke their focus, but Jubei persisted. Holing up in the dojo, Muneakira attempted to approach Kanetsugu to ask for her forgiveness. Coming with him was Jubei, who was able to detect all traps set by Kanetsugu inside the dojo for unknown reasons. Breaking her disguise as Kanetsugu, Keiji Maeda, the weirdly-dressed woman who was also a master of Ki, revealed herself to the group to have actually been assisting with their Ki training all the time, with Jubei being the only one who managed to grasp it. Jubei transformed to her Master Samurai form after Keiji pushed her against Muneakira, and she was now able to keep her memories between the two personalities. However, she was unable to transform back.
19	7	"Non-cancelable!"; Transliteration: "Kaijo Funō!" (Japanese: 解除不能！)	May 17, 2013
Everyone resumed their Ki training under Keiji's guidance. Jubei, however, was still unable to return to her normal form. She overloaded her Ki flow and fell just a short while before the Dark Samurai learned of Keiji and Jubei's Master Samurai form in the Shinkage dojo. Keiji instructed Muneakira to help the ill Jubei control her Ki flow by giving her some of his own Ki. Keiji, sensing the arrival of the Dark Samurais, gave most of her Ki to Muneakira and proceeded to stall the enemies' advance, buying the group some time while she was beaten easily by the four due to her lack of Ki. With the help of Sen and Yukimura, Muneakira managed to help Jubei and she reverted back to her normal form. The group managed to convince Musashi that Jubei hasn't regained her full strength yet, and the Dark Samurai left. On the next day, Keiji sneaked out of the dojo and left with her motorcycle with Gisen watching her.
20	8	"Shadow of Mystery"; Transliteration: "Nazo no Kage" (Japanese: 謎の影)	May 24, 2013
On the way back from the Tokugawa library from a research into Samurai Brides, Yukimura and Matabei were attacked by a mysterious shadowy creature, which was driven away by Hozoin Inshun, unbeknownst to them. News of a street attacker which roamed the town at night were connected to this incident. Jubei befriends Inshun when she and Sasuke met her during Ki training. Meanwhile, Hanzo and Matabei shares their concerns about not being powerful enough to protect their loved ones. That night, the protagonists decided to split up into three teams to investigate the incident. The shadow creature reappeared, seeking something called the "Chingo stone", and attacked Sen, but Hanzo's attack hadn't any effect on it. Inshun appeared to defeat the creature again, but was found out by Jubei.
21	9	"The New Master Samurai"; Transliteration: "Aratana Kenki" (Japanese: 新たな剣姫)	May 31, 2013
Mataemon was found to be regularly possessed by an unknown spirit similar to the mysterious shadowy creature previously encountered. Meanwhile, Yoshihiko Tokugawa was supervising the repair of a "barrier". As Muneakira, Sen, and Yukimura discussed the situation, Jubei ran off, unwilling to belieeve that Inshun was the perpetrator of the street attackings. She met Musashi and told her about Inshun; the latter immediately went searching for Inshun based on her own suspicions. Kojiro watched as Mataemon was possessed again and turned into the shadow creature, and followed her to town. Musashi met and confronted Inshun, and they fought. Noticing this, the Master Samurais went towards the commotion while Muneakira, Hanzo, and Matabei tracked a Ki signal into the bamboo forest, where they met the shadow creature again. Sen noticed this and turned back by herself, but was quickly subdued as the creature probed her memories, revealing that the Chingo stone was related to the barrier Yoshihiko was dealing with since the aftermath of the battle with Amakusa six months ago. Muneakira kissed and transformed Matabei and Hanzo to new Master Samurais, and together they defeated the creature and rescued Sen. In place of the creature, the confused Mataemon appeared, but Kojiro quickly brought her away. The next morning, Gisen opined that the Dark Samurais might be looking for something capable of wiping Great Japan off the map.
22	10	"Secret of the Guardian Stone"; Transliteration: "Chingoseki no Himitsu" (Japanese: 鎮護石の秘密)	June 7, 2013
Kojiro questions the ghost in the cemetery about the reason for the revival of the Dark Samurai; Matabei, Hanzo, Kanetsugu and Gisen wait in the dojo; and Muneakira, Jubei, and Yukimura question Sen about the Guardian Stone. It's revealed that the Guardian Stone lies at the base of Mt Fuji and controls Japan's accumulation of Qi thus protecting it from unstable Qi. Great Japan was founded by the Guardian Stone being placed there and is continually held together by the stone, however the ghost wishes to use the Dark Samurai to destroy the Guardian Stone. The ghost's only desire is for war due to their unapproval of the Tokugawa's power. Yoshihiko's master samurai have thus far stopped them but in their defeat against the Dark Samurai, Charles dropped the name of Jubei as the real identity of the one who defeated Amakusa. This gave Yoshihiko a month for repairs, but the ghost was angry because Musashi got hung up on the battle allowing Yoshihiko that time. Mataemon heard everything and becomes enthused about her condition. Inshun is plagued by being an "empty vessel". Mataemon goes off on her own to find the Guardian Stone while Musashi vows to kill Mataemon. At the dojo, everyone desires to become the Samurai Bride until Yukimura reveals the conditions for it. First, a General must possess seven Master Samurai; second, the seven must share a bond of trust centering on one Master Samurai; and third, the other six must pour their all of their Qi into the trusted Master Samurai channeled through the General. Should everything work (as historically, there's precedence that everyone died one time conducting the procedure) when the Samurai Bride is born, everyone else dies.
23	11	"The Showdown"; Transliteration: "Taiketsu no Koku" (Japanese: 対決の刻)	June 14, 2013
Muneakira and his Master Samurai are attempting to create the Samurai Bride with flashbacks intervening of their conversation after Yukimura revealed the conditions. Due to the sealing by Musashi, Muneakira is unable to continue. Inshun asks Musashi to give Muneakira the method to unseal himself after the battle and disappears while Kojiro talks to Mataemon about the flaws each Dark Samurai possesses due to improper resurrection. While Musashi goes to Yagyu Dojo for the battle, Kojiro and Mataemon attack the Guardian Stone. Jubei provokes Musashi into battle while Inshun defends the Guardian Stone. Inshun is taken down by Mataemon as the ghosts within the cemetery grow stronger due to the damage inflicted upon the Guardian Stone. As Kojiro is about to kill Charles, Gisen appears using her Devil's Eye. Kojiro and Mataemon are able to flee but as the ghosts empower Musashi, she threatens to kill herself since she can't fight fair against Jubei. Keiji appears revealing that Muneakira only needs his own Qi to blow off the seal. The ghost accumulates around the yorishiro, absorbing the Dark Samurai for their powers to battle on its own. Due to Inshun being the "empty vessel", the ghosts are centering around her as Muneakira and his Master Samurai are now faced with defeating this new enemy.
24	12	"Birth of the Samurai Bride"; Transliteration: "Kenhi, Tanjō" (Japanese: 剣妃、誕生)	June 21, 2013
Sen blindly pursues the cursed spirit as it arrives at the Academy with Hanzo sacrificing herself to protect Sen. Distraught, Sen is also killed as she remorses over Hanzo's body. Both are absorbed by the spirit as Yukimura, Matabei, Sasuke and Kanetsugu continue to fight. They are also killed and absorbed one by one as Muneakira, Jubei, and Keiji arrive to witness their absorption. Muneakira attacks the spirit only to be saved by Keiji as he is hit. Enraged Jubei enters into the spirit meeting with Inshun who tells her she wishes to die by Jubei's hand and that it is possible as Muneakira is still alive. Within the Academy, Yoshihiko is informed that the spirit will arrive seven minutes before the Guardian Stone's barrier is complete. Keiji pours her Qi into Muneakira telling Jubei that while everyone else believes that the Samurai Bride is monstrously powerful, she believes that a Samurai Bride isn't. At the request of Jubei, Muneakira enters into the spirit with her as Yoshihiko defends the Academy. Yukimura, Sen, Sasuke, Kanetsugu, Matabei, and Hanzo save Jubei and Muneakira from capture. Convincing them not to fight, everyone pours their Qi into Muneakira who takes Jubei as his Samurai Bride. The spirits possessing Kojiro, Mataemon, and Inshun are defeated by the comforting light of the Samurai Bride and the latter three are released. Only Musashi remains afterwards but is released when Jubei uses her Purified Ascension technique. The barrier protecting the Guardian Stone is completed and Great Japan starts to recover. Gisen praises Jubei on handling the spirit but reveals that Jubei will have to handle her as well someday. Yukimura, Sen, Sasuke, Kanetsugu, Matabei, and Hanzo come back to life as they drift down to Muneakira. After the credits, the spirits seem to be returning only to be stopped by Sasuke applying a seal.

== OVAs ==
No.	Title	Original release date
OVA–1	"Samurai General Election"; Transliteration: "Samurai sō Senkyo" (Japanese: サムライ総選挙)	January 23, 2015
The samurai girls were debating about who should become Muneakira's true bride, each espousing their beliefs about what qualities a good wife should possess. Keiji Maeda visited the Shinkage Dojo with Kagekatsu Uesugi, her lover. She tricked Kagekatsu into joining an online one-week vote-based competition dedicated to determining who should be Muneakira's wife, stemming from his own indecision about the matter. Hilarity ensued as Jubei, Sen, Yukimura, Kanetsugu, and Kagekatsu each did their best to convince Muneakira to take them as a wife by cleaning, cooking, and bathing with him. At first lagging in the competition due to her lack of experience with men, Kagekatsu steadily improved her performance. On the last day, Muneakira burst out yelling that there's no way he can let the result of the competition dictate his choice of brides, and Keiji Maeda congratulates him for learning the lesson. She then brought Kagekatsu home to Yonezawa on her motorbike, the latter seeming to have learned an important lesson herself.
OVA–2	"Samurai Wedding"; Transliteration: "Samurai Uedingu" (Japanese: サムライウェディング)	July 1, 2015
Sen sneaked to a hidden cave and stole a Toyotomi treasure chest, D'Artagnan failing to stop her. The next morning, Sen began pampering Muneakira more than the usual. Muneakira sensed the worrying change in behavior and grew more paranoid about her. Soon, he finds that Kanetsugu and Jubei showed more seduction towards him as well, albeit with a slight change in their personality, along with Gisen, who encourages him that having multiple concubines is normal for a general. Sen revealed she used the power of the "Black Dress", a powerful Toyotomi-era treasure that ensures a marriage will happen between her and Muneakira, and that she had also taken D'Artagnan captive. Yukimura and Matabei appeared to stop her, revealing that should have put on the "White Dress" first, which Sen left in the treasure trove. In the following scuffle, Yukimura and Matabei fell to Sen's Black Dress curse and began craving Muneakira too. Desperate, Muneakira kissed Jubei, and her alter-ego took over the curse's hold. Together, they rescued D'Artagnan and rushed to the White Dress, the only way to stop Sen. They got to it in time, and Jubei wore the splendid White Dress and kissed Muneakira. The resulting energy of the "wedding" undressed Sen and restored everyone else to their normal selves. They then immediately fought for the ownership of the White Dress still worn by Jubei, with Muneakira helpless to stop them.

== DVD/Blu-ray Specials ==
No.	Title	Original release date
1	"The Throbbing Heart of Jubei"; Transliteration: "Jūbee ga Mune Kyun" (Japanese: 十兵衛が胸キュン)	November 25, 2010
2	"Princess Sen's Kissing Lesson"; Transliteration: "Sen-hime Seppun Shinan" (Japanese: 千姫接吻指南)	December 22, 2010
3	"The Maiden's Beach Stories"; Transliteration: "Otome Kaigan Monogatari" (Japanese: 乙女海岸物語)	January 26, 2011
4	"From Kanetsugu to Yukimura"; Transliteration: "Kanetsugu Kara Yukimura e" (Japanese: 兼続から幸村へ)	February 23, 2011
5	"Gisen's Indecent Trap"; Transliteration: "Gisen Inbi na Wana" (Japanese: 義仙淫靡な罠)	March 23, 2011
6	"The Untold Story of the Girls' Photos"; Transliteration: "Otome Satsuei Hiwa" (Japanese: 乙女撮影秘話)	April 27, 2011
