= Take Aim at the Police Van =

- Japanese film poster
- Directed by: Seijun Suzuki
- Written by: Shinichi Sekizawa; Kazuo Shimada (Story)
- Produced by: Ryoji Motegi
- Starring: Michitaro Mizushima; Mari Shiraki; Misako Watanabe; Shinsuke Ashida
- Cinematography: Shigeyoshi Mine
- Edited by: Akira Suzuki
- Music by: Koichi Kawabe
- Production company: Nikkatsu
- Distributed by: Janus Films
- Release date: January 27, 1960
- Running time: 79 minutes
- Country: Japan
- Language: Japanese

Take Aim at the Police Van (十三号待避線より: その護送車を狙え, Jūsangō taihisen yori: Sono gosōsha o nerae) is a 1960 Japanese film directed by Seijun Suzuki and starring Michitaro Mizushima.

== Cast ==
- Michitaro Mizushima as Daijirô Tamon
- Mari Shiraki as Tsunako Andô
- Misako Watanabe as Yûko Hamajima
- Shinsuke Ashida as Jûbei Hamajima
- Ryôhei Uchida as Kuji
- Akira Hisamatsu as Masaki
- Shôichi Ozawa as Gorô Kashima

== Production ==
The Nikkatsu Company conceived Take Aim at the Police Van as a borderless action film, a studio subgenre with internationalized characters and setting. Contract director Seijun Suzuki had previously worked mainly on pop song films, a youth subgenre in which the films were built around an already popular song, and yakuza films with an occasional film noir bent. It also marked the beginning of his practice of co-writing his films. Leading man Michitaro Mizushima had also starred in Suzuki's Underworld Beauty two years earlier. He was atypical of borderless action films by virtue of his age, forty-eight at the time, as they typically featured Nikkatsu's younger stars such as Yujiro Ishihara and Akira Kobayashi.

== Release ==
Take Aim at the Police Van was released in Japan by the Nikkatsu Company on January 27, 1960. It was subsequently released in a five-film DVD box set, titled Nikkatsu Noir, in North America on August 25, 2009, under The Criterion Collection's Eclipse label. The set focuses on noir-themed Nikkatsu Action films and also includes I Am Waiting (1957), Rusty Knife (1958), Cruel Gun Story (1964) and A Colt Is My Passport (1967) with liner notes by film historian Chuck Stephens.

The A.V. Club's Noel Murray felt the film holds up against contemporary Hollywood film noir. Rating it less abstract than Seijun Suzuki's films of a few years later, he highlighted its vim and social candor and named it "[a testament] to how artists pumping out quickie exploitation product can often work in truths about their times that prestige filmmakers can't."
