= Arashi no naka o tsuppashire =

1958 film

- Theatrical poster
- Directed by: Koreyoshi Kurahara
- Written by: Kenrō Matsuura
- Starring: Yujiro Ishihara; Mari Shiraki; Sanae Nakahara; Kō Nishimura; Shinsuke Ashida
- Cinematography: Kuratarō Takamura
- Edited by: Akira Suzuki
- Music by: Riichirō Manabe
- Distributed by: Nikkatsu
- Release date: October 29, 1958 (Japan)
- Running time: 90 minutes
- Country: Japan
- Language: Japanese

Arashi no naka o tsuppashire (Japanese: 嵐の中を突っ走れ), also known as Showdown in the Storm, is a 1958 Japanese color drama film directed by Koreyoshi Kurahara and produced by Nikkatsu.

== Cast ==
- Yujiro Ishihara
- Mari Shiraki
- Sanae Nakahara
- Kō Nishimura
- Shinsuke Ashida
