= A Colt Is My Passport =

- Film poster
- Directed by: Takashi Nomura
- Written by: Shūichi Nagahara; Nobuo Yamada; Shinji Fujiwara (Novel)
- Produced by: Takeo Yanagawa
- Starring: Joe Shishido; Jerry Fujio; Chitose Kobayashi; Ryōtarō Sugi
- Cinematography: Shigeyoshi Mine
- Edited by: Akira Suzuki
- Music by: Harumi Ibe
- Distributed by: Nikkatsu
- Release date: February 4, 1967 (Japan)
- Running time: 84 minutes
- Country: Japan
- Language: Japanese

A Colt Is My Passport (Japanese: 拳銃(コルト)は俺のパスポート, Hepburn: Koruto wa Ore no Pasupōto) is a 1967 Japanese yakuza film directed by Takashi Nomura for the Nikkatsu Corporation. It is based on the novel Tobosha by Shinji Fujiwara.

It stars Joe Shishido as a hitman and Jerry Fujio as his partner. Shishido plays a contract killer, a role he frequently performed. The film was his personal favorite among the approximately 100 films he made at Nikkatsu.

The film was strongly influenced by French New Wave and crime films directors such as Jean-Pierre Melville, Jacques Becker or Henri Decoin and by Sergio Leone-style westerns. Nomura's use of still shots in the opening sequence has been compared to manga art techniques.

This film was made available in North America when Janus Films released a special set of Nikkatsu noir films as part of the Criterion Collection, also including I Am Waiting, Rusty Knife, Take Aim at the Police Van, and Cruel Gun Story.

== Plot ==
Contract killer Shuji Kamimura (Joe Shishido) and his partner Shun Shiozaki (Jerry Fujio) are hired by yakuza boss Senzaki to eliminate a former partner, Boss Shimazu, who has embezzled from an international co-op between both men. Kamimura successfully assassinates Boss Shimazu at his home while meeting with Senzaki. Kamimura and Shun attempt to leave the country by plane, but are waylaid and kidnapped by Shimazu's men. The duo escapes by stopping their car with a specially designed second brake behind the driver's seat that Shun had installed earlier, which kills Shimazu's men.

Senzaki's lieutenant Nozaki orders them to hide out at a truck stop, the Hotel Nagisakan, to wait for further instructions. Whilst staying there, the duo form a connection with the hotel's overworked waitress, Mina. Later that night, more gunmen under Shimazu's lieutenant, following information from fellow yakuza boss Tsugawa arrive to kill them, but do not find the duo as they have escaped by bribing one of the patrons to take them to another motel.

The next day, Miyoshi, Shimazu's enforcer, attempts to kill the duo by intercepting them and ordering their ferry which was supposed to be their getaway vehicle to depart early. Kamimura and Shun show up in the truck they rode in from the previous night and run over the hitman, but the ferry has already left. Returning to the Nagisakan, Kamimura drugs Shun with a sleeping pill while Mina directs him to a freighter captain willing to smuggle the three out of the country. However, Tsugawa manages to broker a peace deal between Senzaki and Shimazu's son, who has succeeded his father as boss. The two settle their differences and decide to have Kamimura eliminated.

Shun is later kidnapped at the Nagisakan, and when Mina arrives to pick him up and her belongings, is told by Senzaki by phone to have Kamimura meet with one of his henchmen. Later, Mina returns to Kamimura and tries to leave without Shun, but one of Senzaki's men arrives. Kamimura then negotiates to have Shun released in exchange for himself in three hours.

The exchange goes as planned, and the ship leaves without Kamimura, who arranges to meet with Senzaki and Shimazu at a landfill the next morning for his execution. Kamimura then spends the rest of the day planning on how to fight off the gunmen, spying on them testing a special car with bulletproof windows, which Senzaki, Shimazu, and Tsugawa plan to use to safely watch Kamimura's execution. In order to destroy the car, Kamimura then builds a bomb and digs a ditch to hide in so he can safely plant the bomb on the car.

Shortly after finishing the ditch, he is beset by hitmen and fends them off. The car carrying Senzaki, Shimazu, and Tsugawa then moves to run him over with Miyoshi in the front trying to shoot Kamimura. Kamimura is hit several times but when the car is almost upon him, he dives into the ditch and plants the bomb under the car. The car explodes, killing all its occupants. An injured Kamimura then briefly surveys the carnage before limping away, ending the film.

== Cast ==
- Joe Shishido as Shuji Kamimura
- Jerry Fujio as Shun Shiozaki
- Chitose Kobayashi as Mina
- Shoki Fukae as Funaki
- Hideaki Esumi as Senzaki
- Jun Hongo as Kaneko
- Akio Miyabe as Miyoshi
- Toyoko Takechi as Otatsu
- Zenji Yamada as barge captain
- Kanjuro Arashi as Shimazu
- Ryōtarō Sugi as Shimazu's successor
- Kojiro Kusanagi as hitman
- Takamaru Sasaki as Otawara
- Asao Uchida as Tsugawa
- Zeko Nakamura as apartment receptionist

== Remake ==
Gareth Evans, the director of The Raid franchise, is officially set to direct a remake of the film for Amazon MGM’s Orion Pictures. Evans only got around to watching A Colt Is My Passport during the COVID-19 pandemic when he discovered it streaming on the Criterion Channel—“and quickly fell in love.” He later introduced the film at the 2023 L’Etrange Festival, where he also shared a heartfelt write-up in its honor. A cast was announced in September 2025 shortly after filming concluded. The cast includes Sope Dirisu, Tim Roth, Jack Reynor, Lucy Boynton, Victor Alli, Ewan Mitchell, Burn Gorman and Noah Taylor.
