= Jerry Fujio =

Japanese singer and actor (1940–2021)

Jerry Fujio ジェリー藤尾
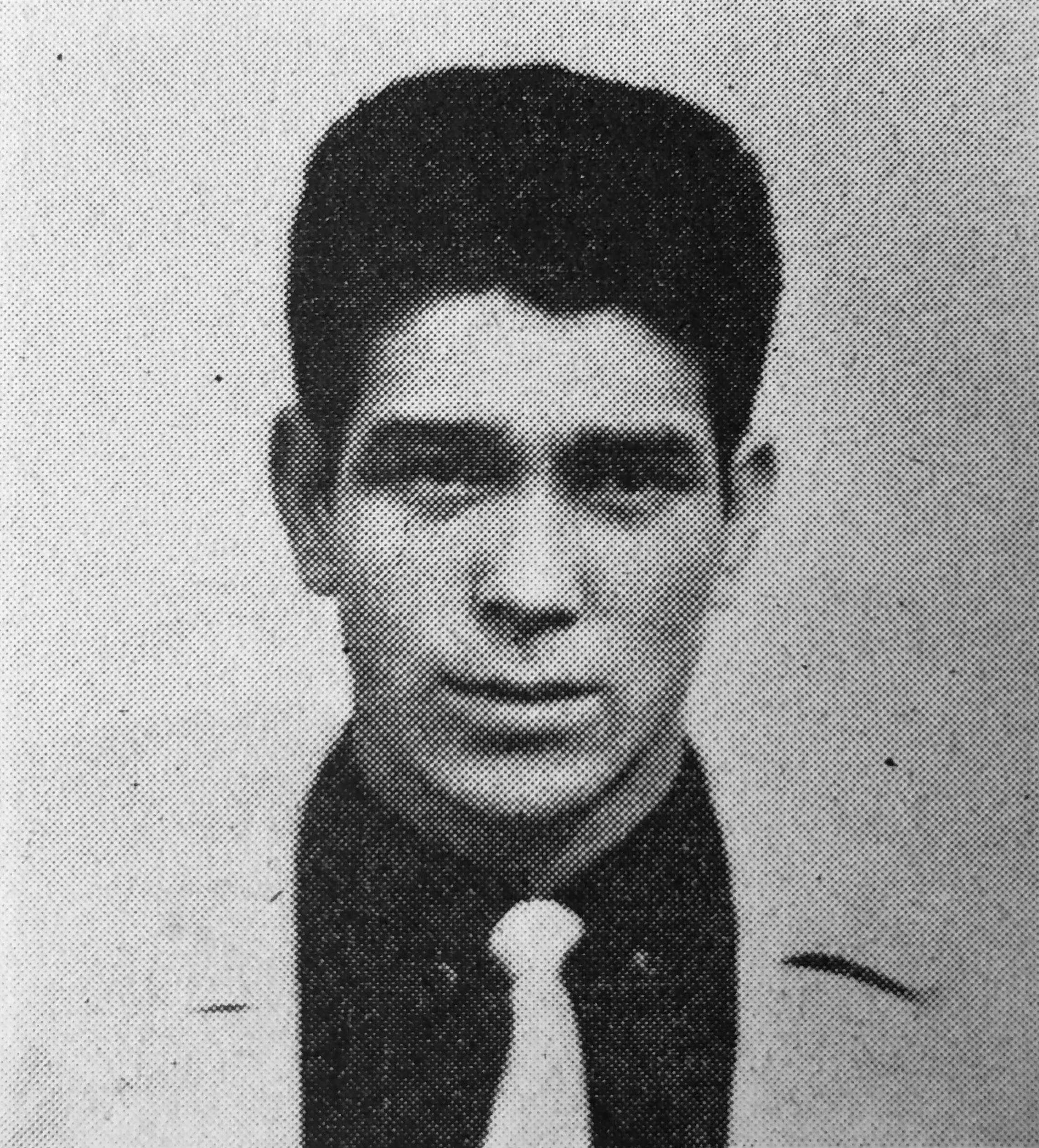

Background information
- Born: Shigeki Fujio; 26 June 1940; Shanghai, RNGR China, Empire of Japan
- Died: 14 August 2021 (age 81)
- Occupations: Singer, actor, tarento
- Years active: 1958–2021

Jerry Fujio (ジェリー藤尾, Jerī Fujio); 26 June 1940 – 14 August 2021) was a Japanese singer, actor and tarento. Born to a British mother and Japanese father in Shanghai, in Japanese-occupied China, his real name was Shigeki Fujio (藤尾 薫紀, Fujio Shigeki).

Fujio was represented with Office Kiko. He was known for one of his songs "Tōku e Ikitai". Fujio dropped out from Senshi University Keio High School. His daughters were former actresses Miki Fujio and Aki Fujio. Fujio's ex-wife was singer and tarento Tomoko Watanabe. He died in Yokohama of acute pneumonia.

== Discography ==
Title
"Kanashiki Indian"
"Tōku e Ikitai"
"Dare ka to Darekaga"
"Yubifue no Oka"
"Papa to Waltz o Odorou"
"Grandpapa"
"Danny Boy"
"My Way"
"Kanpai"

== Filmography ==
=== Films ===
Year	Title
1959	Dokuritsu Gurentai
1960	Minagoroshi no Uta Yori: Kenjū yo Saraba!
1961	Yojimbo
1963	Jerry no Mori no Ishimatsu
1965	Ereki no Wakadaishō
1967	A Colt Is My Passport
1970	Dodes'ka-den
1981	Nihon Philharmonic Monogatari: En no Dai go Gakushō

=== TV series ===
Year	Title	Role	Network	Notes
1959	The Hit Parade		Fuji TV	
1962	Yume de Aimashou		NHK TV	
1965	Tokyo Keibi Shirei: The Guardman		TBS	Episodes 18 and 55
1968	Three Outlaw Samurai	Karakkaze no Mataji	Fuji TV	Fifth Series Episode 14
1968	Kiyoshi Atsumi no Naite Tamaru ka		TBS	
1968	Key Hunter		TBS	Guest
1969	Sukedachi-ya Sukeroku: Adauchi		TBS	Episode 19
1969	Go-banme no Deka		TV Asahi	Episode 12
1972	Sasurai no Ōkami	Mushiri no Sairoku	TV Asahi	
1972	All-Star Kazoku Taikō Utagassen		Fuji TV	
1973	Diving Quiz		TV Asahi	Third host
1974	Yoake no Deka	Nanbara	TBS	Episode 7
1975	Waratte Waratte 60-bu		TBS	
1977	Yabure Bugyō		TV Asahi	
1978	The Stingiest Man in Town		TV Asahi	Voice; Lead role
	Taiyō ni Hoero!		NTV	Guest
1994	Bijin OL-goroshi		TV Asahi	
	Monomane Ōzakettei-sen		Fuji TV	Judge

=== Direct-to-video ===
Year	Title
1992	Luminous / Jerry Fujio & Kaoru Hinoki
1992	Akutoku no Kunshō: Black Cop
2006	Miss Machiko: Tōdai o Juken Dai Sakusen
2007	Kumichō × Shasatsu: Tama o To re
2007	Jitsuroku Gedō no Mure: Ryūketsu no Chinkonka

=== Advertisements ===
Year	Title	Notes
1974	Toyota Corolla	
	Ezaki Glico One Touch Curry	
Sanyo Shinpan

=== Radio ===
Year	Title	Network	Notes
2010	Hakamamitsuo no Hanashi no Neta	Radio Japan	Guest

== Kōhaku Uta Gassen contestant history ==
No.	Year	Song
12th	1961	"Ishimatsu Yarō no Uta"
13th	1962	"Tōku e Ikitai"
14th	1963	"Dare ka to Darekaga"
