= Koreyoshi Kurahara =

Japanese film director

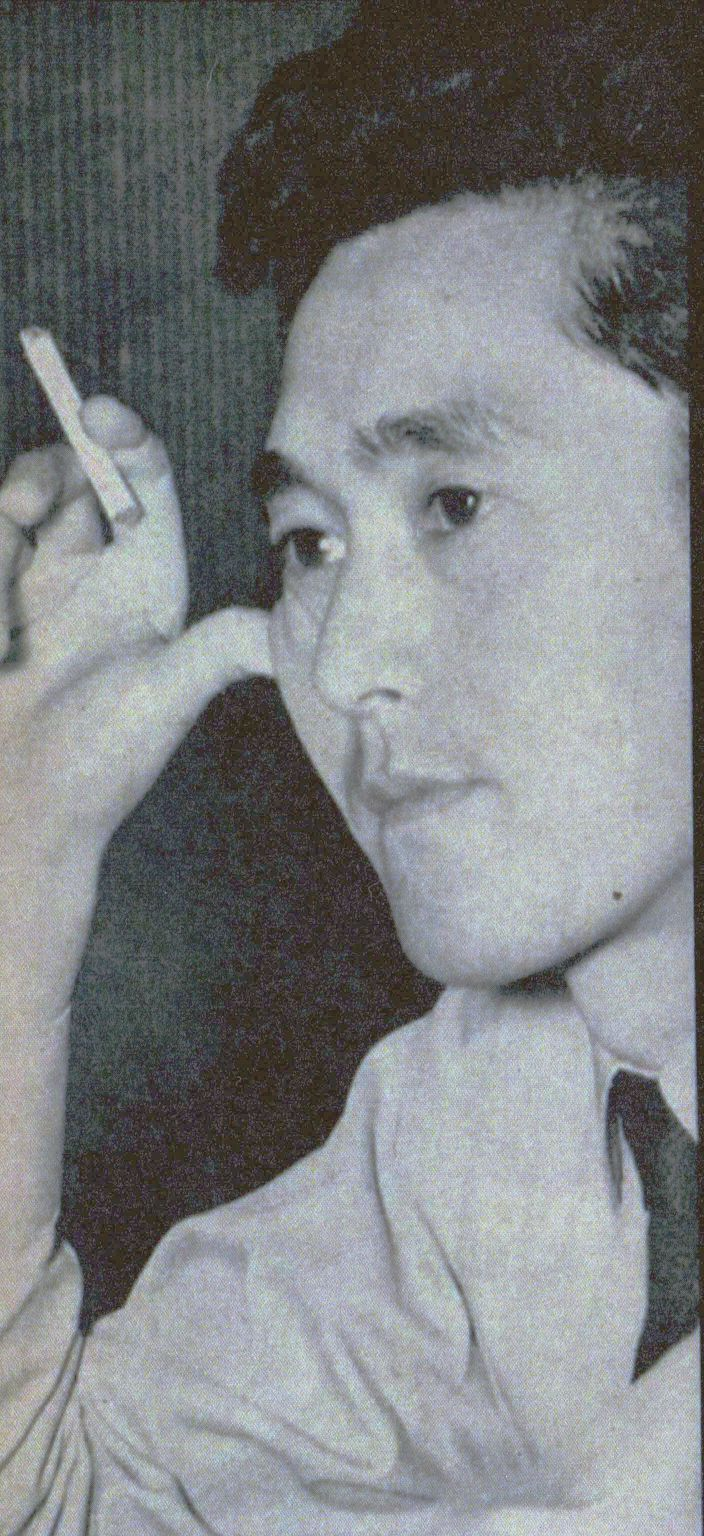
- Koreyoshi Kurahara in 1967
- Born: 31 May 1927; Kuching, Sarawak
- Died: 28 December 2002 (aged 75); Japan
- Occupations: Film director and screenwriter
- Years active: 1942–2002

Koreyoshi Kurahara (蔵原惟繕, Kurahara Koreyoshi) (31 May 1927 – 28 December 2002) was a Japanese screenwriter and director. He is perhaps best known for directing Antarctica (1983), which won several awards and was entered into the 34th Berlin International Film Festival. He also co-directed Hiroshima (1995) with Roger Spottiswoode, which was nominated for the Primetime Emmy Award for Outstanding Miniseries.

== Biography ==
He was born in Kuching, Kingdom of Sarawak (now a state of Malaysia) on Borneo, to an agricultural engineer. His family returned to Japan when Kurahara was in elementary school. He was the nephew of literary critic Korehito Kurahara, and older brother of film director Koretsugu Kurahara. His son Jun Iwasaki, a former producer for Ishihara International Productions Inc., is currently secretary to politician Nobuteru Ishihara.

While a film student at Nihon University College of Art, he became a live-in student of Kajiro Yamamoto at the introduction of Ishirō Honda. Upon graduation in 1952 he joined Shochiku's Kyoto studio and worked as an assistant director. He switched to Nikkatsu in 1954, working mainly as chief assistant director to Eisuke Takizawa.

He made his directorial debut in 1957 with I Am Waiting, starring Yujiro Ishihara, and gained recognition for his bold camera work and angles. He subsequently directed numerous films starring Ishihara and Ruriko Asaoka.

In 1960, he made the first Japanese film noir, Intimidation, and in 1964 he made the film Black Sun, the story of a Black GI on the run who meets a Japanese jazz fan. The latter had a soundtrack from Max Roach's band featuring Clifford Jordan and Abbey Lincoln. The soundtrack was issued on CD in Japan only in 2007.

After going freelance in 1967, he helmed a succession of blockbusters and popular works including Safari 5000, The Glacier Fox, The Gate of Youth and Umi e, See You. His 1983 film Nankyoku Monogatari (aka Antarctica) was a 5.9 billion yen hit and held the Japanese box office record for a domestic film until it was surpassed by Miyazaki Hayao's Princess Mononoke in 1997. The film was later adapted into a 2006 American remake, Eight Below, which is also dedicated to him.

== Filmography ==
=== Film ===
- The Shadow of Fear (狙われた男 Nerawareta otoko, 1956) (co-directed with Kō Nakahira)
- I Am Waiting (俺は待ってるぜ Ore wa matteru ze, 1957)
- A Man in the Fog (霧の中の男 Kiri no naka no otoko, 1958)
- Fūsoku 40 metres (風速40米 Fūsoku yonjū mētoru, 1958)
- Arashi no naka o tsuppashire (嵐の中を突っ走れ Arashi no naka o tsuppashire, 1958)
- The Third Dead Angle (第三の死角 Dai san no shikaku, 1959)
- Dynamite ni Hi o Tsukero (爆薬に火をつけろ Dynamite Ni Hi o Tsukero, 1959)
- The Woman from the Sea (海底から来た女 Kaitei kara kita onna, 1959)
- A Turning to Hell (地獄の曲り角 Jigoku no magarikado, 1959)
- The Age of Our Own (われらの時代 Warera no jidai, 1959)
- Intimidation (ある脅迫 Aru kyōhaku, 1960)
- The Warped Ones (狂熱の季節 Kyōnetsu no kisetsu, 1960)
- Desperation (破れかぶれ Yabure kaburo, 1961)
- Kono wakasa aru kagiri (この若さある限り Kono wakasa aru kagiri, 1961)
- Gambler at Sea (海の勝負師 Umi no shōbuchi, 1961)
- The Jet That Flew into the Storm (嵐を突っ切るジェット機 Arashi wo tsukkiru jettoki, 1961)
- Mexico mushuku (メキシコ無宿 Mexico Wanderer, 1962)
- Love in Ginza (銀座の恋の物語 Ginza no koi no monogatari, 1962)
- I Hate But Love (憎いあンちくしょう Nikui anchikushō, 1962)
- Glass Johnny: Looks Like a Beast, aka Glass-Hearted Johnny (硝子のジョニー 野獣のように見えて Garasu no Jonî: Yajû no yō ni miete, 1962)
- I Fly for Kicks (何か面白いことないか Nani ka omoroi koto nai ka, 1963)
- Black Sun (黒い太陽 Kuroi taiyō, 1964) – Features a soundtrack by Max Roach
- The Flame of Devotion (執炎 Shûen, 1964)
- Dawn Song (夜明けのうた Yoake no uta, 1965)
- The Heart of Hiroshima (愛と死の記録 Ai to shi no kiroku, 1966)
- Thirst for Love (愛の渇き Ai no kawaki, 1967)
- Safari 5000 (栄光への5000キロ Eiko e no 5000 kiro, 1969)
- Sunset, Sunrise (陽は沈み陽は昇る Hi wa shizumi, hi wa noboru, 1973)
- Two in the Amsterdam Rain (雨のアムステルダム Ame no Amsterdam, 1975)
- The Glacier Fox (キタキツネ物語 Kita-kitsune monogatari, 1978) (documentary)
- Elephant Story (象物語 Zou monogatari, 1980) (documentary) (co-directed with Hino Narimichi and Koretsugu Kurahara)
- The Gate of Youth (青春の門 Seishun no mon, 1981) (co-directed with Kinji Fukasaku)
- The Gate of Youth: Part 2 (青春の門 自立篇 Seishun no mon: Jiritsu hen, 1982)
- Antarctica (南極物語 Nankyoku Monogatari, 1983)
- Haru no Kane (春の鐘 Spring Bell, 1985)
- Michi (道 The Road, 1986)
- Umi e, See You (海へ 〜See you〜, 1988)
- Strawberry Road (ストロベリーロード Sutoroberi rodo, 1991)
- Hiroshima (1995) (co-directed with Roger Spottiswoode)

=== Television ===
- Tasukenin Hashiru (1974) episodes 1, 6, 13, 14, 21, 22, 35, 36
- Hissatsu Shiokiya Kagyō (1975) episodes 1, 6, 7, 12, 15, 18, 28
- Hissatsu Karakurinin Keppūhen (1976) episodes 1, 5, 7
- Daitokai (1976–79)
