= Takumi Furukawa =

Japanese film director (1917–2018)

- 古川卓己
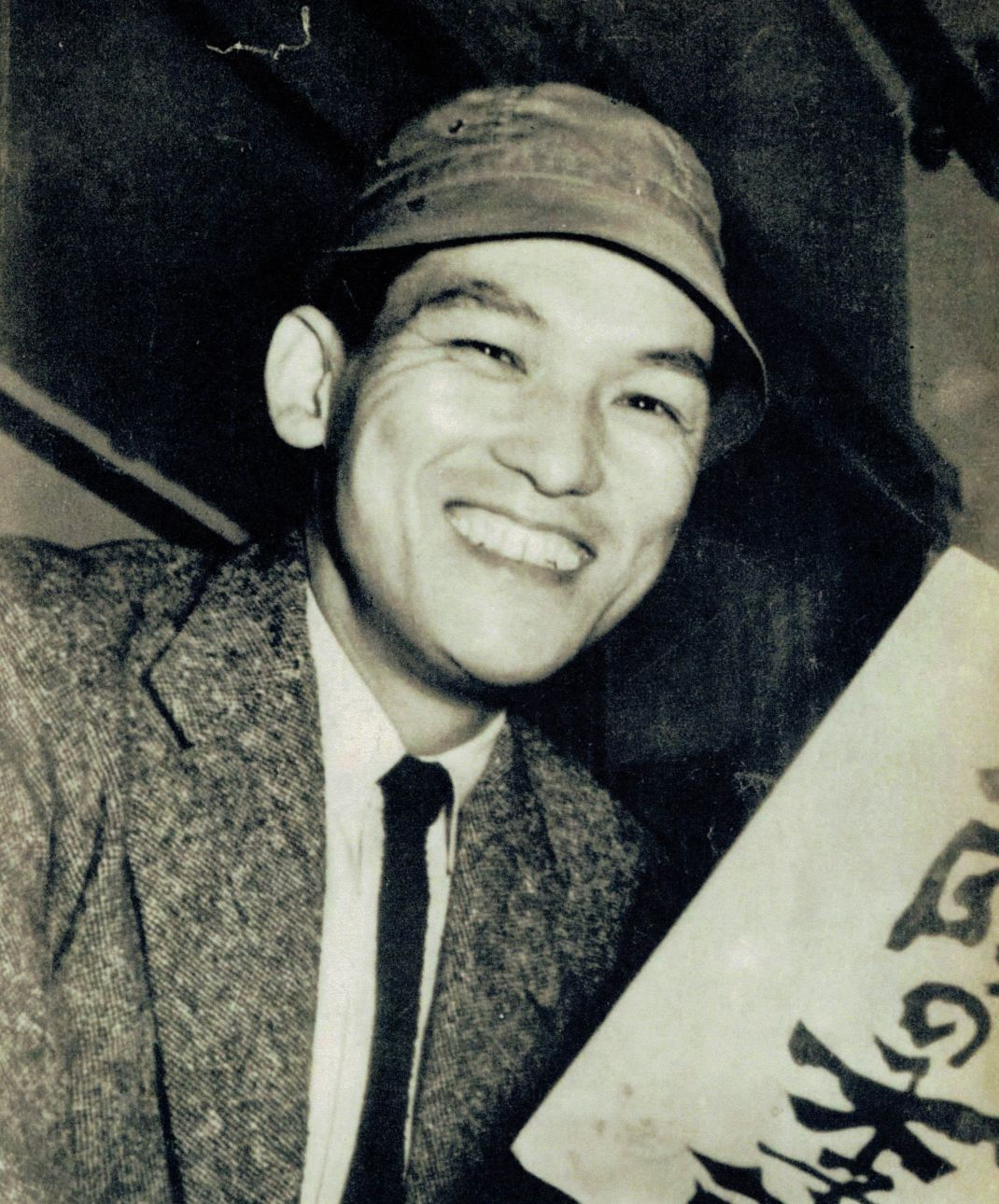
- Born: Iwasaki Takumi; 27 March 1917; Hachioji, Tokyo, Japan
- Died: 4 October 2018 (aged 101); Tokyo, Japan
- Other names: Tai Kao-Mei
- Occupations: Film director, screenwriter

Takumi Furukawa (古川 卓己, Furukawa Takumi; 27 March 1917 – 4 October 2018), aka Tai Kao-Mei (Chinese: 戴高美), was a Japanese film director.

== Career ==
Born in Tokyo as Iwasaki Takumi, Furukawa graduated from the College of Art at Nihon University in 1941 and entered the Nikkatsu studio first in the screenwriting division before becoming an assistant director. After serving in the war, he returned to work at Daiei Film before returning to Nikkatsu when it resumed producing films in 1954. While working as an assistant director, he assisted such directors as Tomotaka Tasaka, Kajiro Yamamoto, Akira Kurosawa, and Heinosuke Gosho.

He made his directorial debut in 1955 with Jigoku no Yōjinbō, which starred Rentarō Mikuni and for which he wrote the script. He is most known for directing Season of the Sun in 1956, which was a box office success and helped launch the career of Yujiro Ishihara. His Cruel Gun Story (1964) was released on DVD with English subtitles by Eclipse from the Criterion Collection. Furukawa directed two films in Hong Kong and dramas for television.

Furukawa died of heart failure on 4 October 2018 in a Tokyo hospital at the age of 101.

== Filmography ==
=== Films ===
This is a partial list of films.

- 1955 Jigoku no Yōjinbō
- 1956 Season of the Sun
- 1964 Cruel Gun Story
- 1967 Black Falcon - Screenwriter, Director. Mandarin language Hong Kong film.
- 1967 Kiss and Kill - Director. Mandarin language Hong Kong film.
