= Cruel Gun Story =

1964 film

- Directed by: Takumi Furukawa
- Written by: Haruhiko Oyabu; Hisataka Kai
- Starring: Joe Shishido; Chieko Matsubara; Tamio Kawaji; Yuji Odaka; Minako Kazuki; Hiroshi Nihonyanagi; Yasukiyo Umeno; Shōbun Inoue; Kojiro Kusanagi
- Release date: 1 February 1964
- Running time: 87 min
- Country: Japan
- Language: Japanese

Cruel Gun Story (拳銃残酷物語, Kenjū zankoku monogatari) is a 1964 Japanese heist film directed by Takumi Furukawa.

This film was made available in North America when Janus Films released a special set of Nikkatsu studio's Noir films as part of The Criterion Collection, also including I Am Waiting, Rusty Knife, Take Aim at the Police Van, and A Colt Is My Passport.

In the film, a yakuza boss arranges the prison release of an experienced bank robber. The former convict is asked to lead the team needed to rob an armored truck. Following the heist, the leader is betrayed by the crime boss and his main partner in crime is fatally injured. In retaliation, the leader wants to kidnap the son of the crime boss.

== Plot ==
Joji Togawa, a former bank robber serving a sentence for the murder of the truck driver who left his sister paraplegic in a hit and run, is released from prison early due to the influence of Matsumoto, a wealthy yakuza boss. Matsumoto’s right-hand man, Ito, makes Togawa a proposal: Matsumoto wants him to lead a team to rob an armored truck carrying the city’s racetrack earnings to the bank, a job which would earn 120 million yen, half of which would go to the Matsumoto Family and half of which the crew can split amongst themselves.

Togawa is initially skeptical but is convinced when he learns his old partner in crime, Shirai, will also be taking part. The two recruit washed up boxer Okada and heroin-addict former police officer Teramoto to round out the crew. The plan involves diverting the armored truck off the main road by having Teramoto pose as a police officer and put up road accident signs. Once the truck is in a more deserted country road, Togawa will shoot out its motorcycle outriders to get the truck to stop and the drivers to get out. To cover up the robbery, the truck, bodies and motorcycles will be packed into a cargo truck with an electric winch and taken to a hiding spot before eventually being discarded elsewhere.

Prior to the robbery, Togawa visits his sister, Rie, at the hospital where she’s undergoing treatment. Togawa tells her he feels responsible for her accident, since he made her go on the late night grocery trip during which she was run over, but Rie assures him he has no reason to blame himself and that she’s just happy to have him back. When Togawa says he will soon have the money to pay for an operation to cure her, Rie makes him promise not to commit any more crimes for her sake and gives him a rosary as a reminder to stay on the right path. Afterwards, Togawa visits his friend Takizawa and asks him to take care of Rie if he cannot. Suspecting Togawa is planning something, Takizawa tries to dissuade him, but Togawa cannot be deterred.

On the day of the robbery, everything goes according to plan until after the outriders are shot: The armored truck drivers refuse to exit the vehicle and thus the armored truck has to be packed inside the winch truck with the drivers still inside it. Due to the delay caused by the armored truck drivers, the outriders’ bodies and motorcycles are left at the scene, where they are found by the police. The crew takes refuge in an abandoned factory and hook-up the winch truck’s exhaust to the cargo hold to force the armored truck drivers to abandon the truck inside, lest they suffocate. The plan works but Shirai is shot in the shoulder by one of the dying drivers as they are pulled out of the truck.

The group is surprised when Teramoto’s girlfriend, Keiko, suddenly arrives and reveals that she has secretly been spying on them on behalf of Ito. She takes Togawa to meet with Ito while Shirai, Okada and Teramoto stay at the factory guarding the money. Ito tells Togawa and Keiko to stay at a nearby hotel for the night so they can take him to where the money is stashed the following morning. However, when the pair arrive at the hotel, they are ambushed by some of Ito’s hitmen and have to kill them to get away. The pair split up, with Togawa heading for the factory and Keiko going to Takizawa’s house.

At the factory, Okada and Teramoto double-cross Shirai and beat him to steal the money. However, Togawa returns and kills them both to save his friend. Soon after, Ito and dozens of yakuza arrive, leading to a massive shootout. Togawa and a wounded Shirai are forced to flee into the sewers to escape their attackers, leaving the money behind. The next morning, Takizawa and Keiko track down Togawa and Shirai to one of the sewer’s outflows. Togawa insists on calling an ambulance for Shirai, but Takizawa takes his pulse and informs him that he is already dead.

Days later, Togawa is hiding from both the police and the yakuza in Takizawa’s home, plotting to kidnap Matsumoto’s son Haruhiko and hold him for ransom, both to regain the money and to humiliate Matsumoto as revenge for Shirai’s death. Takizawa and Keiko try to convince him to leave the country, but he cannot be dissuaded. After leaving, Togawa is approached by Yanagida, the head of a yakuza group opposed to Matsumoto, who deduced he’d taken part in the truck robbery. Yanagida and his men offer to aid Togawa in recovering the money in exchange for splitting it, whereupon Togawa tells them of his kidnapping plan. Before carrying it out, Togawa sneaks into his sister’s hospital to see her once more but ultimately gives up and leaves due to the police presence.

Togawa and Yanagida’s men successfully kidnap Haruhiko and demand the 120 million yen as ransom. Matsumoto agrees to the terms, but Ito tries to dissuade him, saying the money doesn’t just belong to him but rather the entire organization. When Matsumoto insists, Ito offers to oversee the exchange, allegedly to ensure his boss’ safety. However, at the exchange Ito defies his orders and has his men ambush Yanagida and his crew, killing them and Haruhiko. Back in Matsumoto’s house, just as the boss receives a call from Ito informing him of the failed exchange, Togawa takes advantage of most of the guards being gone to sneak in and confront him. The boss says betraying Togawa and his crew was Ito’s idea, which Togawa says he already knows, telling him Ito likely killed his son and intends to supplant him atop the family. When Matsumoto pulls out a hidden gun, Togawa shoots him and then leaves with the money.

After discovering the dead Matsumoto and the missing money, Ito goes to Takizawa’s home and threatens him into helping set up Togawa, but Takizawa resists and Ito shoots him. Ito lies in wait for Togawa but accidentally kills Keiko when she shows up. When Togawa arrives soon after, he catches Ito distracted in the middle of hiding Keiko’s body and shoots him dead. Togawa finds a wounded Takizawa, who mistakes him for Ito and shoots him before dying. Horrified by the carnage and delirious from the bullet wound, Togawa stumbles around the house and accidentally starts a fire after knocking some kerosene onto an electric kettle. As the money and his friends’ bodies burn around him, Togawa clutches the rosary his sister gave him and succumbs to his wounds.

== Cast ==
- Joe Shishido - Joji Togawa
- Tamio Kawaji - Takizawa
- Yuji Odaka - Shirai
- Chieko Matsubara - Rie Togawa
- Minako Kazuki - Keiko
- Hiroshi Nihonyanagi - Matsumoto
- Yasukiyo Umeno - Ito
- Shōbun Inoue - Okada
- Kojiro Kusanagi - Teramoto
- Junichi Yamanobe - Yanagida
- Hiroshi Kondo - Kondo
- Saburo Hiromatsu - Saeki
