= Two in the Amsterdam Rain =

- Film poster
- Directed by: Koreyoshi Kurahara
- Screenplay by: Nobuo Yamada
- Produced by: Tomohiro Kaiyama; Koreyoshi Kurahara
- Starring: Kenichi Hagiwara; Keiko Kishi; Rentarō Mikuni; Alain Cuny
- Cinematography: Kôzô Okazaki
- Edited by: Michiko Ikeda
- Music by: Takayuki Inoue
- Production company: Toho
- Distributed by: Toho
- Release date: March 21, 1975 (Japan)
- Running time: 123 minutes
- Country: Japan
- Language: Japanese

Two in the Amsterdam Rain (Japanese: 雨のアムステルダム, Hepburn: Ame no Amsterdam) is a 1975 Japanese romantic drama spy thriller directed by Koreyoshi Kurahara and written by Nobuo Yamada. It is a rare example of a Japanese film set in the Netherlands. The plot concerns a Japanese expatriate in Amsterdam who rekindles his connection to an old flame, and the international spy plot that slowly engulfs them.

It stars a multi-national cast, including Kenichi Hagiwara as the protagonist, Keiko Kishi as his femme fatale crush, Rentarō Mikuni as an employee of a rival trading company, and Alain Cuny as the film's overarching antagonist. Toho released the film theatrically on March 21, 1975, in Japan.

== Premise ==
Akira Sakuda (Kenichi Hagiwara) is a Japanese expatriate working in Amsterdam for a small trading company. He spots Ryo (Keiko Kishi), a woman he had a crush on in high school, at the Schiphol Airport, and again in the rainy streets. He approaches her, and they catch up with one another. Akira still has feelings for Ryo, but there is more to her than meets the eye. Slowly but surely, the two become wrapped up in an international conspiracy involving trade disputes, oil and politics.

== Cast ==
- Kenichi Hagiwara as Akira Sakuda
- Keiko Kishi as Ryo Nakatsu
- Rentarō Mikuni as Masaoka Seinosuke
- Alain Cuny as Witenstein V
- Noboru Matsuhashi as Kunio Katayama
- Mario Pecqueur as Pierre Dura
- Ten Boman as Oil Minister Ali
- Eric Beeks as Fritz Rosen
- Jacques Forestier as Arnold Helvman
- Eddie Tezuka as Kazuo Takimura
- Hiromitsu Ashikawa as Shimizu
- Yasuda Masato as Koyanagi
- Yuji Yoshihara as Yoshimura
- Tomohiro Kaiyama as Counselor Suzuki
- Hiromi Oka

== Production ==
Shooting took place in various locations throughout Amsterdam. These include the Schiphol Airport, the Hotel Okura Amsterdam, Dam Square and Amsterdam Centraal station.

Tomohiro Kaiyama produced several films for Kurahara, including his 1983 blockbuster Antarctica. Nobuo Yamada also collaborated with Kurahara multiple times, having earlier written Sunset, Sunrise and Safari 5000, and later adapting Strawberry Road for the director.

== Music ==
The film's jazz-funk score was composed by Takayuki Inoue, a member of Japanese band The Spiders. It was released in 1975 by Polydor Records.

All music is composed by Takayuki Inoue:

| No. | Title | Length |
|---|---|---|
| 1. | "Two in the Amsterdam Rain Theme" | 3:39 |
| 2. | "Suspense in the Rain" | 1:54 |
| 3. | "Ryo's Theme" | 1:59 |
| 4. | "Two in the Amsterdam Rain Theme 2" | 2:46 |
| 5. | "Love Theme" | 2:27 |
| 6. | "Market Morning" | 1:08 |
| 7. | "Love Theme 2" | 1:56 |
| 8. | "Two in the Amsterdam Rain Theme 3" | 1:15 |
| 9. | "Roller Skating (from The Fall of Youth)" | 1:32 |
| 10. | "Theme of Zao Zesshō" | 4:50 |
| 11. | "Ryo's Theme 2" | 3:12 |
| 12. | "Bad Friend" | 3:10 |
| 13. | "Jukebox" | 0:59 |
| 14. | "Theme from The Fall of Youth" | 4:48 |
| Total length: | | 35:35 |

== Release ==
Two in the Amsterdam Rain was theatrically released by Toho on March 21, 1975, in Japan.

The film was released to DVD on December 18, 2019, as part of Toho's DVD Masterpiece catalogue. This was to commemorate the death of Hagiwara, who had died earlier that year.
