= Shōbun Inoue =

Japanese actor (1927–2013)

- Born: 22 August 1927; Nagoya, Aichi Prefecture, Japan
- Died: 28 January 2013 (aged 85)
- Occupation: Actor
- Years active: 1957–2001

Shōbun Inoue (井上 昭文, Inoue Shōbun; 22 August 1927 – 28 January 2013) was a Japanese actor.

Inoue started his acting career at the Haiyuza Theatre Company. Later, he signed his contract with Nikkatsu film company.

== Filmography ==
=== Films ===
- Throne of Blood (1957) as Tsuzuki's messenger
- Sun in the Last Days of the Shogunate (1957) as Genta
- The Human Condition: Road to Eternity (1959)
- Hana and Ryu (1962)
- Izo no Odoriko (1963)
- Aoi sanmyaku (1963) as Nakata
- Cruel Gun Story (1964) as Okada
- The Long Death (1964)
- Our Blood Will Not Forgive (1964) as Ushigoro Tobita
- The Wild Sea (1969) as Takei
- Mushukunin Mikogami no Jkichiō Kawakazeni Kakowa Nagareta (1972)
- Sword of the Beast (1965) as Araiwa
- Tokyo Drifter 2: The Sea is Bright Red as the Color of Love (1966) as Onijima
- Zatoichi and the Fugitives (1968) as Kumeji
- Men and War (1970)
- Tempyō no Iraka (1980) as Yoshihiko
- Minna no Ie (2001) as Painter

=== Television drama ===
- Taiga drama
  - Taikōki (1965) as Date Masamune
  - Ten to Chi to (1969) as Tomita Gōzaemon
  - Haru no Sakamichi (1971) as Kawai Takeemon
  - Tokugawa ieyasu (1983) as Yamagata Masakage
- Oshizamurai Kiichihōgan (1973) (ep.9) as Sabu
- Lone Wolf and Cub (1973) (ep.15) as Jyunai Kutsuki
- Zatoichi (1974) (ep.12) as Gonzō
- The Fierce Battles of Edo (1979) (ep.5)
- Tobe Hissatsu Uragoroshi (1979) (ep.16) as Izō
- Shadow Warriors (1980) (ep.9)
- Pro Hunter (1981) (ep.7)
- Taiyō ni Hoero! (1982) (ep.495) as Denkichi Hakamada, (1985) (ep.636) as Kōzō Nagata
- Seibu Keisatsu (1982–83) as Gentarō Hama
- Hissatsu Shigotonin V (1985) (ep.5) as Kiheiji
- Onihei Hankachō (1991) (ep.18) as Kosuke, (1995) (ep.9) as Kannana
