= The Glacier Fox =

- Film poster
- Directed by: Koreyoshi Kurahara
- Screenplay by: Koreyoshi Kurahara
- Produced by: Atsushi Tomioka; Hiromu Tsugawa; Shintaro Tsuji
- Narrated by: Eiji Okada (original release); Arthur Hill (American version)
- Cinematography: Akira Shiizuka; Masao Tochizawa; Seizo Sengen; Tsuguzo Matsumae; Hideo Omura; Keisuke Tateishi; Yoshio Mamiya
- Edited by: Akira Suzuki; Koreyoshi Kurahara
- Music by: Godiego; Masaru Sato
- Production company: Sanrio Films
- Distributed by: Toho-Towa
- Release dates: July 15, 1978 (Japan); January 5, 1979 (United States)
- Running time: 117 minutes (original release); 97 minutes (anniversary edition); 90 minutes (American version)
- Country: Japan
- Language: Japanese
- Box office: $27 million (est.)

The Glacier Fox (Japanese: キタキツネ物語, Hepburn: Kita-kitsune monogatari), also known as The Story of the Northern Fox and The Fox: In the Quest of the Northern Sun, is a 1978 Japanese nature docufiction film written and directed by Koreyoshi Kurahara. It was released in Japan on July 15, 1978, where it was distributed by Toho. The film follows the lives of two red foxes and their family in northern Japan.

The Glacier Fox preceded two other Kurahara-directed animal films: 1980's Elephant Story (象物語, Zou monogatari) and the 1983 blockbuster Antarctica (南極物語, Nankyoku monogatari).

== Premise ==
Director Koreyoshi Kurahara chronicles a year in the lives of Flep and Leila, two foxes living in Hokkaido, Japan's northernmost island, where the freezing winters are long and the mild summers short. After Flep defeats another male fox to become Leila's lifelong partner, they mate and raise a litter of five kits. With their family complete, the group must contend with human interference in their habitat, such as chicken farms and snowmobiles, and struggle against the debilitating cold of winter. The animals experience both triumph and tragedy, as the law of this harsh land proves – only the strong survive.

== Production ==
The Glacier Fox was Japan's first major nature documentary, capturing the ecology of northern red foxes living in a harsh natural environment. The project originated from the work of veterinarian and zoologist Minoru Taketazu, who had researched red foxes for years. Ken Takahashi, editor-in-chief of the animal magazine Anima, published an article written by Taketazu on the subject of the red fox in the magazine's first issue in 1973. This article inspired Takahashi, who later proposed the project to Sanrio, which agreed to fund the film. Kurahara was hired shortly afterwards. Taketazu also served as animal handler and animal director in the production.

The film was shot over a period of four years near Kitami, Kushiro, Abashiri, Monbetsu, and Koshimizu along the Sea of Okhotsk coast of Hokkaido.

Co-cinematographer Akira Shiizuka would go on to shoot several animal-related films, including Kurahara's Antarctica; co-editor Akira Suzuki also contributed to that film. Additionally, co-cinematographer Tsuguzo Matsumae later shot A Tale of Africa, another Sanrio production.

The score was composed by Masaru Sato, while the songs (including the film's theme song "Red Hunter") were written and performed by the band Godiego. The lyrics for the English-dubbed version were written by Yoko Narahashi, Randy Bishop and Marty Gwinn, with vocals by Gwinn, Rod Burton and Bartholomew Bishop. Recording for the dubbed songs took place at Rusk Sound Studios in Hollywood, with Randy Bishop as producer and T. E. Sadler, John Mosely and James A. Corbett credited with re-recording.

== Release ==
=== Theatrical ===
The Glacier Fox was theatrically released in Japan on July 15, 1978. It was a hit, drawing an audience of 2.3 million people and earning ¥970 million in rentals at the Japanese box office. This was equivalent to $11,000,000 in gross receipts. (Note: See Film industry § Average ticket price.)

An English-dubbed version running 90 minutes in length was given an American theatrical release by The Samuel Goldwyn Company on January 5, 1979. This version was written by Walter Bloch, edited by Terence Anderson, produced by Mark L. Rosen and narrated by Arthur Hill. It grossed $3.5 million in its limited US release. This was equivalent to 1,400,000 ticket sales.

In mainland China, the film released in 1979 and is estimated to have sold at least 100 million tickets at the box office. This was equivalent to $13,000,000 in gross receipts.

Globally, the film grossed an estimated $27,000,000 from 103,700,000 ticket sales worldwide.

The film was later screened at the 21st Tokyo International Film Festival in the "natural TIFF" section, a special category created to tie in with the festival's overall ecological theme that year.

=== Home media ===
It was later broadcast on Fuji Television's "Golden Western Movie Theater" program on August 10, 1979, garnering a viewership rating of 44.7%. As of 2013, it still held the record for highest ratings for a live-action film on a Japanese television network.

In Japan, the film was released on LaserDisc on August 21, 1984.

In the United States, the English dub was aired on both the Disney Channel and HBO. A VHS of this version was distributed in 1985 by Family Home Entertainment.

== Anniversary edition ==
Thirty-five years after its initial release, the film was digitally restored and re-edited, incorporating different voice actors for the foxes' thoughts (including Ryuta Sato as Flep, Aya Hirano as Leila and Toshiyuki Nishida as the narrator) and new music, as well as previously unreleased footage cultivated from 100 hours of unused material. This version was released as a "35th Anniversary Revised Edition" on October 19, 2013. The original film was 117 minutes long, but the anniversary edition is 97 minutes long. Junichi Mimura, director of the anniversary edition, who also served as assistant director on the original production, was inspired to re-edit the film by the 2011 Tohoku earthquake and tsunami. He chose to juxtapose images of the disaster-stricken areas with the original story of foxes surviving the frozen Hokkaido landscape.
