= Eiji Okada =

Japanese actor (1920–1995)

- 岡田 英次
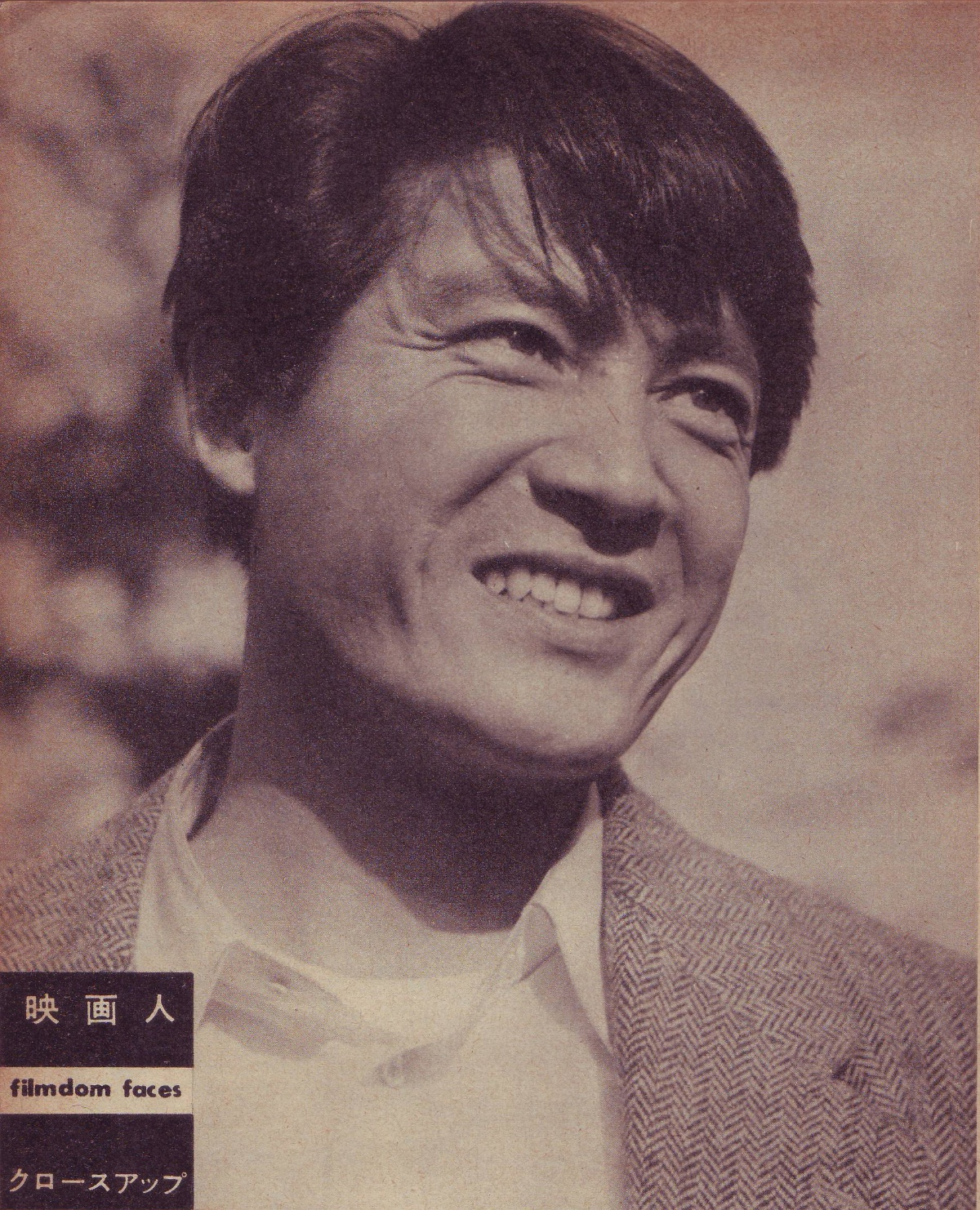
- Eiji Okada. taken in 1954.
- Born: 13 June 1920; Chiba, Japan
- Died: 14 September 1995 (aged 75)
- Occupation: Actor
- Years active: 1946–1995
- Spouse: Aiko Wasa

Eiji Okada (岡田 英次, Okada Eiji; 13 June 1920 – 14 September 1995) was a Japanese film actor from Chōshi, Chiba. Okada served in the Imperial Japanese Army during World War II and was a miner and traveling salesman before becoming an actor.

Internationally, his best-remembered roles include Lui ("him" in French) in the 1959 film Hiroshima mon amour, directed by Alain Resnais. In this film, Eiji Okada had to learn the screenplay phonetically because he did not speak French. He is also known for playing the entomologist Niki Junpei in Hiroshi Teshigahara's 1964 film Woman in the Dunes, an adaptation of Kōbō Abe's novel. He was also second billed under Marlon Brando in the 1963 political thriller The Ugly American.

Okada was married to Aiko Wasa, with whom he ran a theatre company in Japan. He died on 14 September 1995 of heart failure, at the age of 75.

== Selected filmography ==
- Onna no Kao (1949)
- Hana no Sugao (1949)
- Until We Meet Again (1950) – Tajima Saburo
- Shiroi yajû (1950) – Iwasaki
- Gozen reiji no shutugoku (1950)
- Kenjū no Mae ni Tatsu Haha (1950)
- Nakinureta ningyô (1951) – Ryûji
- Fūsetsu Nijūnen (1951)
- Kaze ni soyogu asi (Kouhen) (1951) – Mitsujiro Hirose
- Yamabiko Gakkō (1952)
- Asa no hamon (1952) – Kajigoro
- Mother (1952) – Shinjiro
- Boryoku (1952)
- Shinkū Chitai (1952) – Okamoto
- Haha wo Kou Uta (1952)
- Reimei hachigatsu jugo-nichi (1952)
- Himeyuri no Tō (1953) – Teacher Tamai
- Hiroshima (1953) – Kitagawa
- Miseraretaru Tamashii (1953)
- Wakaki Hi no Takuboku Kumo wa Tensai De Aru (1954) – Takuboku Ishikawa
- Okuman choja (1954) – Monta
- Hana to Hatō (1954)
- Ningen Gyorai Kaiten (1955)
- Koko ni Izumi Ari (1955)
- Hana no Yukue (1955) – Hiroshi Hamamura
- Gokumonchô (1955) – San'nosuke Tsuzuki
- Christ in Bronze (1955)
- Bōryokugai (1955)
- Kao no nai otoko (1955) – Masahiko Arisaka / Yamada
- Kenjû tai kenjû (1955)
- Choppu sensei (1956)
- Shonen tanteidan: Nijumenso no akuma (1956) – Kogoro Akechi
- Shonen tanteidan: Daiichibu yokaihakushi (1956)
- Kurama Tengu, Shirouma no Misshi (1956)
- Jun'ai Monogatari (1957) – Shitayama
- Dotanba (1957)
- Shonen tanteidan: Tetto no kaijin (1957) – Kogoro Akechi
- Shonen tanteidan: Kabutomushi no yoki (1957)
- Shingo juban-shobu (1959) – Shozaburo Masaki
- Hiroshima mon amour (1959) – Lui
- Shingo jûban shôbu: dai-ni-bu (1959)
- Shinran (1960) – Shiro Amagi
- Ôzora no muhômono (1960)
- Kaizoku bahansen (1960)
- Restoration Fire (1961) – Yamanami Keisuke
- Kengo tengu matsuri (1961)
- Rififi in Tokyo (1963) – Danny Riquet
- The Ugly American (1963) – Deong
- Kanojo to kare (1963) – Eiichi Ishikawa
- Woman in the Dunes (1964) – Entomologist Niki Jumpei
- The Scent of Incense (Kôge - Nibu: Mitsumata no shô/Ichibu: Waremokô no shô) (1964) – Nozawa
- Ansatsu (1964) – Lord Matsudaira
- The Scarlet Camellia (1964) – Genjirô Maruume
- Haigo no hito (1965) – Masaaki Izumida
- Sanshiro Sugata (1965) – Gennosuke / Tesshin
- Samurai Spy (1965) – Tatewaki Koriyama
- Nihon daikyôkaku (1966) – Shuji Onoda
- Hikô shôjo Yôko (1966) – Asai
- The Face of Another (1966) – The Boss
- Bosû wa ore no kenjû de (1966)
- The X from Outer Space (1967) – Dr. Kato
- Portrait of Chieko (1967) – Tsubaki
- Utage (1967) – Adachi
- The Sands of Kurobe (1968) – Yoshino
- Irezumi muzan (1968)
- Shin irezumi muzan tekka no jingi (1968)
- Showa no inochi (1968)
- Tarekomi (1969) – Toru Kijima
- Dankon (1969) – George Kitabayashi
- Nyotai (1969) – Nobuyuki Ishidô
- Jotai (1969) – Nobuyuki Ishido
- Mujo (1970)
- Senketsu no kiroku (1970)
- Yomigaeru daichi (1971) – Mitsuo iwashita
- Yami no naka no chimimoryo (1971) – Ikezoe
- Silence (1971) – Inoue Chikugonokami
- Tsuji-ga-hana (1972)
- Bara no hyôteki (1972) -Tachibana Mike
- Zatoichi's Conspiracy (1973) – Shinbei of Hitachiya
- Lone Wolf and Cub: Baby Cart in the Land of Demons (1973) – Wakita
- Lady Snowblood (1973) – Gishirô Tsukamoto
- Waga michi (1974) – Lawyer
- Mesu (1974) – Kokubo
- The Yakuza (1974) – Tono
- ESPY (1974) – Salabad
- I am a cat (1975) – Bunmei
- Manhunt (1976)
- Lullaby of the Earth (1976) – Evangelist
- Utareru mae-ni ute! (1976) – President Kudo
- Permanent Blue: Manatsu no koi (1976) – Boy's father
- Arasuka monogatari (1977) – Amaohka
- Seishun no mon: Jiritsu hen (1977) – Minoru Yuki
- Utamaro: Yume to shiriseba (1977) – Tanuma
- Wakai hito (1977) – Mr. Okajima
- Nihon no jingi (1977) – Yohei Inada
- Genshiryoku sensô (1978) – Professor Kamiyama
- Ogin-sama (1978) – Ankokuji
- Furimukeba Ai (1978) – Ryunosuke Tamaru
- The Glacier Fox (1978) – Narrator
- Kôtei no inai hachigatsu (1978) – Tokunaga
- Blue Christmas (1978)
- Ôgon no inu (1979) – Shuhei Agata
- The Strangling (1979) – Yoshio Morikawa
- Jishin rettô (1980)
- Kofukugo shuppan (1980)
- The Gate of Youth (1981) – Tôno, Chika's step father
- Crazy Fruit (1981) – Yuzo Dojima
- Nankyoku Monogatari (1983) – Chief Ozawa
- Akujo kamakiri (1983) – Taichi Dôjima
- Haru no Kane (1985) – Hachiro Ishimoto
- Ôidippsu no katana (1986) – Shunsuke's uncle
- Oedipus no yaiba (1986) – Shunsuke's uncle
- Guriin rekuiemu (1988) – Zenichiro Okada
- Shishiohtachi no natsu (1991) – Kazumichi Sakagami
- Kagerô (1991) – Masakichi Ono
- Jutai (1991) – Ichimatsu, Grandfather
- Harukana jidai no kaidan o (1995) – White man
- Hitodenashi no koi (1995) – (final film role)
