= Shinsuke Ashida =

Japanese actor (1914–1999)

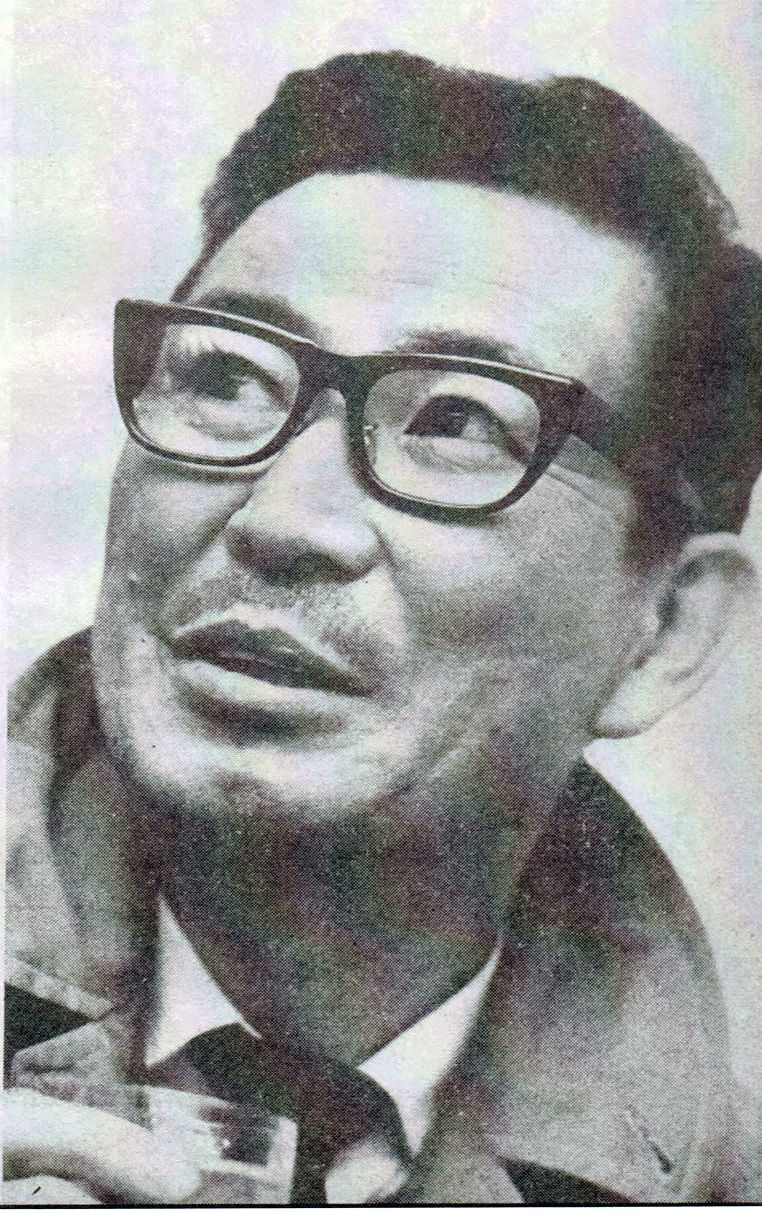
- Shinsuke Ashida in 1967
- Born: 14 March 1914; Shimane, Japan
- Died: 10 January 1999 (aged 84); Tokyo, Japan
- Occupation: Actor
- Years active: 1952-1996

Shinsuke Ashida (芦田伸介, Ashida Shinsuke; 14 March 1914 – 10 January 1999) was a Japanese actor. He appeared in more than 90 films between 1952 and 1996.

== Selected filmography ==
=== Film ===
- Gendai-jin (1952)
- Mahiru no ankoku (1956)
- An Actress (1956)
- Underworld Beauty (1958)
- Arashi no naka o tsuppashire (1958)
- My Second Brother (1959)
- Everything Goes Wrong (1960)
- Kurenai no Kenju (1961), Kokuta
- Red Angel (1966), Doctor Okabe
- Red Handkerchief (1964)
- Woman of the Lake (1966)
- Shōsetsu Yoshida gakkō (1983), Ichirō Hatoyama
- Haru no Kane (1985), Toichiro Miyake
- Death of a Tea Master (1989), Toyotomi Hideyoshi
- Shaso (1989)
- Childhood Days (1990)
- Ruten no umi (1990)

=== Television ===
- Akō Rōshi (1964)
- Shin Heike Monogatari (1972), Minamoto no Yorimasa
- Genroku Taiheiki (1975), Tokugawa Tsunayoshi
- The Women of Osaka Castle (1983), Shibata Katsuie
- Musashibō Benkei (1986), Taira no Kiyomori
- Nobunaga: King of Zipangu (1992), Saitō Dōsan
