= Takashi Nomura =

Japanese film director

Takashi Nomura (野村孝) (February 18, 1927 – May 5, 2015) was a Japanese film director for studios including Nikkatsu. The Criterion Collection described him as a "prominent, stylistically daring director".

In 1955, he joined Nikkatsu Film company and he made his director debut with Tokusōhan Gogō in 1960. Nomura directed such films as Itsudemo Yume wo and Quick Draw Joe (1961).

He is perhaps best known for A Colt Is My Passport (1967), influenced by French New Wave filmmakers such as Jean-Pierre Melville, and by Sergio Leone-style Westerns. Nomura's use of still shots in the opening sequence has been compared to manga art techniques.

== Partial filmography ==
Title	Romanization	Release date	Notes
特捜班５号	Tokusō han 5-gō	1960	
爆破命令	Bakuha meirei	1960	
摩天楼の男	Matenrō no otoko	1960	
Urban Sky Bouncer 都会の空の用心棒	Tokai no sora no yōjimbō	1960	
Quick Draw Joe 早射ち野郎	Hayauchi Yarō	1961	
都会の空の非常線	Tokai no sora no hijō-sen	1961	
大森林に向って立つ	Dai shinrin ni mukatte tatsu	1961	
The Black Scar 黒い傷あとのブルース	Kuroi kizu ato no burūsu	1961	
A Torrent of Love 激流に生きる男	Gekiryū ni ikiru otoko	1962	
遙かなる国の歌	Harukanaru kuni no uta	1962	
Tomorrow's Bride あすの花嫁	Asu no hanayome	1962	
いつでも夢を	Itusdemo yume wo	1963	
Foggy Night Blues 花嫁は十五才	Yogiri no burūsu	1963	
Punishment of a Lawless Villain 無頼無法の徒 さぶ	Burai muhō no to-sabū	1964	
未成年 続・キューポラのある街	Miseinen - Zoku cupola no aru machi	1965	
Do or Die 殺るかやられるか	Yaruka yarareruka	1966	
Wandering Song 放浪のうた	Sasurai no uta	1966	
A Colt Is My Passport 拳銃(コルト)は俺のパスポート	Coruto wa ore no pasupōto	1967	
Burning Clouds 燃える雲	Moeru kumo	1967	
Gambling Lifeblood a.k.a. The Broken Vow 鮮血の賭場	Senketsu no toba	1968	
Showdown at Nagasaki a.k.a. Lineage of Showa Yakuza-Profile of Nagasaki 昭和やくざ系図 長崎の顔	Showa yakuza keizu - Nagasaki no kao	1969	
100 Gamblers 博徒百人	Bakuto hyakunin	1969	
100 Gamblers - Chivalrous Path a.k.a. Chivalrous Pride 博徒百人 仁侠道	Bakuto hyakunin - ninkyodo	1969	
Document of Blood a.k.a. Records of Bloodshed 鮮血の記録	Senketsu no kiroku	1970	
Women Smell of Night ネオン警察 女は夜の匂い	Neon keisatsu onna wa yoru no nioi	1970	
Blood Vendetta 逆縁三つ盃	Gyakuen mitsusakazuki	1971	
地上最強のカラテ	Chijo saikyo no karate	1976	
雨のめぐり逢い	Ame no Meguriai	1977	

=== Television ===
- Sengoku Rock Hagurekiba (1973) (episodes 1 and 6)
- Akai Unmei (1976)
- Akai Kizuna (1977)
- Hokkaido satsujin ryokou: Watashi no konyaku nikki (北海道殺人旅行 わたしの婚約日記) (1981)
- Ryōjin nikki (1983)
- Haha ni sasageru hanzai: Utsukushii onna souzokunin (1983)
- Matsumoto Seichô no Takadai no ie (1985)
- Kyōtarō Nishimura's Travel Mystery 10 (1987)
- Kyōtarō Nishimura's Travel Mystery 11 (1987)
- Kyōtarō Nishimura's Travel Mystery 12 (1987)
- Kyōtarō Nishimura's Travel Mystery 13 (1988)
- Kyōtarō Nishimura's Travel Mystery 14 (1989)
- Kyōtarō Nishimura's Travel Mystery 20 (1991)
- Kyōtarō Nishimura's Travel Mystery 24 (1993)
- Kyōtarō Nishimura's Travel Mystery 25 (1994)
- Kyōtarō Nishimura's Travel Mystery 26 (1994)
- Kyōtarō Nishimura's Travel Mystery 28 (1995)
- Kyōtarō Nishimura's Travel Mystery 29 (1996)
- Kyōtarō Nishimura's Travel Mystery 30 (1996)
- Kyōtarō Nishimura's Travel Mystery 32 (1998)
- Kyōtarō Nishimura's Travel Mystery 33 (1999)
- Takahashi Hideki's Captain Series (1988–2002)
