= Victor Alli =

English actor

- Born: London
- Education: BRIT School; Royal Academy of Dramatic Art
- Occupation: Actor
- Television: Bridgerton

Victor Alli is a British stage, television and film actor from London. His television roles include Bridgerton (2024).

== Career ==
Alli attended the BRIT School and later graduated from RADA in 2019. On stage, he had a role in the West End as part of a production of Tennessee Williams play The Glass Menagerie, starring Amy Adams.

His television roles include Gangs of London, The Man Who Fell to Earth, Last Light, and Andor. In 2024, he could be seen as John Stirling, the Earl of Kilmartin, in the third and fourth season of Netflix historical drama series Bridgerton.

His films roles include Kenneth Branagh's films Belfast (2021) and Death on the Nile (2020). In 2025, he completed principal photography on Gareth Evans action film A Colt is My Passport.

== Personal life ==
From London, Alli was born in Lambeth and later lived near London Fields with his wife, Deborah. He is of Nigerian descent.

== Filmography ==
Key
†	Denotes projects that have not yet been released

=== Film ===
Year	Title	Role	Notes	Ref.
2014	The Line	Vince	Short film	
2016	False Men	Cassio	Short film	
2021	Belfast	Soldier		
2021	Rhyme Or Die	Colin	Short film	
2022	Death on the Nile	Marc Yves		
TBA	A Colt Is My Passport †	Nathan Johnson	Filming	

=== Television ===
Year	Title	Role	Notes	Ref.
2021	Grantchester	Howie Bennet	Episode: "Series 6, Episode 4"	
2022	The Man Who Fell to Earth	Danny Holland	Episode: "Under Pressure"	
2022	Last Light	Owen Jones	Miniseries; 4 episodes	
2022	Andor	Pit #1	Episode: "Daughter of Ferrix"	
2023	Unicorn: Warriors Eternal	Adult Seng	Voice role; 2 episodes	
2024–2026	Bridgerton	Lord John Stirling	Main role; 13 episodes	
2025	Gangs of London	Johnny Galloway	Recurring role; 2 episodes	
