= I Am Waiting (film) =

- Theatrical poster
- Directed by: Koreyoshi Kurahara
- Written by: Shintarō Ishihara
- Produced by: Takiko Mizunoe
- Starring: Yujiro Ishihara; Mie Kitahara
- Cinematography: Kurataro Takamura
- Edited by: Akira Suzuki
- Music by: Masaru Sato
- Color process: Black and white
- Distributed by: Nikkatsu
- Release date: October 20, 1957
- Running time: 91 minutes
- Country: Japan
- Language: Japanese

I Am Waiting (Japanese: 俺は待ってるぜ, Hepburn: Ore wa matteru ze) is a 1957 Japanese crime film directed by Koreyoshi Kurahara. I Am Waiting was part of the Nikkatsu film studio's wave of Japanese noir films, which were produced in order to compete with popular American and French films at Japanese box offices. The film was made available in North America when Janus Films released a special set of Nikkatsu Noir films as part of the Criterion Collection. These films include Rusty Knife, Take Aim at the Police Van, Cruel Gun Story and A Colt Is My Passport.

I Am Waiting was one of Nikkatsu's earlier successes.

== Plot ==
On a dark night, former boxer Jōji Shimaki (Yujiro Ishihara) meets Saeko (Mie Kitahara), a club singer on the verge of suicide. They live and work together at a restaurant where they begin to fall in love, struggling to escape from their dark pasts. Jōji deals with his failure as a boxer, shamed of having been barred from the ring. Saeko hopes to hide from gangsters who have forced her to work at their cabaret. She seeks his help as she is trying to run away from her gangster boss, who is forcing her to continue working even though she no longer has a talented voice due to illnesses.

They both find their source of support in their sole dreams: he wishes to go to Brazil to join his brother on a ranch, and she dreams of finding love. During the quest for his brother, Jōji discovers the horrible truth of the situation. His brother never made it to Brazil. Instead, a group of gangsters killed him for his money. Continuously pushed away by gangsters, they learn that dreams are easily crushed.

== Cast ==
- Yujiro Ishihara -Jôji Shimaki
- Mie Kitahara - Saeko
- Hideaki Nitani -Shibata (older)
- Isamu Kosugi -Uchiyama
- Ken Hatano - Shibata (younger)
- Kôjirô Kusanagi - Takeda
- Naoki Sugiura - Shibata's brother
- Kenjiro Uemura - Police detective
