= Umi e, See You =

- DVD cover
- Directed by: Koreyoshi Kurahara
- Screenplay by: Sō Kuramoto
- Based on: Adventurers of the Sand by José Giovanni
- Produced by: Masaru Otaki; Hiroshi Fujikura; Yutaka Okada
- Starring: Ken Takakura; Junko Sakurada; Philippe Leroy; Nenji Kobayashi; Ayumi Ishida
- Cinematography: Toshiaki Satô
- Edited by: Akira Suzuki
- Music by: Ryudo Uzaki; Shūichi Chino
- Production companies: New Century Producers; Toho
- Distributed by: Toho
- Release date: May 18, 1988 (Japan)
- Running time: 174 minutes
- Country: Japan
- Languages: Japanese; English; Italian; French; Spanish

Umi e, See You (Japanese: 海へ 〜See you〜, Hepburn: Umi e 〜See you〜; lit. To the Sea 〜See you〜) is a 1988 Japanese auto racing epic film directed by Koreyoshi Kurahara and written by Sō Kuramoto. It is based on the story Suna no bôkensha (lit. Adventurers of the Sand) by José Giovanni (credited onscreen as Joze Jovanni). The plot revolves around the Paris-Dakar Rally, an off-road endurance race spanning 13,000 kilometers and multiple continents. It follows the lives, loves and losses of the competitors of Japan's Team DANKAI during the 1988 competition. Umi e, See You was theatrically released by Toho on May 18, 1988, and stars a multi-national cast with Ken Takakura in the lead role, alongside Junko Sakurada, Philippe Leroy, Nenji Kobayashi and Ayumi Ishida.

This production was Sō Kuramoto's final feature film screenwriting credit for 36 years until the release of Silence of the Sea in 2024.

== Plot ==
With the Paris-Dakar Rally fast approaching, SurfBreak, the sponsor of Mitsubishi's Team DANKAI, adds popular celebrity Ryuichi Yoshii (Goro Ohashi) to their roster for publicity. Mizuki (Nenji Kobayashi), DANKAI's team leader, recognizes the strain this puts on his team, in addition to their general dysfunction and baggage. He also knows it is necessary to have a support vehicle (a 1985 Mercedes-Benz 2628 NG camion) running alongside the team's Pajero rally cars. Thus Mizuki seeks the help of legendary mechanic and driver Eiji Honma (Ken Takakura). Honma had retired years prior due to the deaths of multiple friends in his dangerous profession. However, Mizuki persuades Honma to come out of retirement one last time and help DANKAI win the race.

On January 1, 1988, the rally cars depart Paris en route to Dakar, the capital city of Senegal located on the Cap-Vert peninsula. Honma soon discovers from his old friend and fellow participant Toto Luciano (Philippe Leroy) that Honma's ex-wife Kei (Ayumi Ishida) is also participating in the rally, alongside her current husband, the bullfighter Antonio Vázquez (Tomas Arana). In addition, Honma's support truck comes to include stowaway passenger Yuko Takei (Junko Sakurada), Yoshii's pop star girlfriend who had followed him from Japan in an attempt to salvage their relationship. Eiji keeps her hidden in the truck during the day and his tent at night, as she does not have a passport.

Over the course of the race, the relationship between the selfish Yoshii and DANKAI begins to sour. While navigating the Sahara Desert, tensions come to a head. A fight breaks out, but Honma mediates the dispute and gets the team back in the race. In this moment, Yuko reveals her presence to Yoshii, but Yoshii yells at her, saying he does not want her there. Later, Yoshii's car breaks down. Mizuki sacrifices parts from his vehicle, forfeiting his role in the race, in order to give Yoshii a chance to finish. The other team members look to Eiji as de facto leader in Mizuki's absence. Meanwhile, Eiji tells Yuko that she cannot continue riding with him. Yuko reluctantly agrees. Eiji asks Toto to send her ahead to Dakar to await their arrival.

Through multiple trials and tribulations, including wrong turns, rough terrain and a sandstorm, Yoshii and the team learn to trust each other, and DANKAI finishes the race. Upon arrival, Yuko greets Yoshii, and Yoshii embraces her. However, Kei and Antonio's car suffers an accident in the West African desert. Eiji arrives to provide assistance, but before he can pull them out, their vehicle explodes, and both perish. Though he has completed the rally, Honma once again becomes a mourner. He erects a cross in the desert using the remains of their vehicle. Toto looks on as Eiji hangs a necklace on the cross, the same necklace Kei had given him years earlier.

== Cast ==
- Ken Takakura as Eiji Honma
- Junko Sakurada as Yuko Takei
- Philippe Leroy as Toto Luciano
- Nenji Kobayashi as Mizuki
- Ayumi Ishida as Kei
- Tomas Arana as Antonio Vázquez (credited as Thomas Arana)
- Goro Ohashi as Ryuichi Yoshii
- Ryudo Uzaki as Katsuragi
- Hideharu Otaki as Hikawa
- Shin Takuma as Itoi
- Goro Kataoka
- Kenji Isomura
- Jean Claude Robe
- Hiroshi Fuse as Yasu
- Tsutomu Tomura
- Yuzuru Nishimura
- Beppe Chierici
- Kazue Tsunogae
- Mayumi Asaka as Erika Yokouchi
- Kōjirō Kusanagi
- Haruko Kato as Eiji’s mother
- Takeshi Ôbayashi
- Shinshô Nakamaru
- Shinji Kanai
- Heikki Poranen
- Richard De Burnchurch
- Carlo Monni
- Amelie Cohen
- Sôkyû Fujita (credited as Munehisa Fujita)
- Sadayoshi Sakamoto
- Shôichirô Sakata (also known as Masahiko Sakata)
- Satoru Saitô
- Makoto Kakeda
- Haruyuki Imaizumi
- Kôji Saitô
- Kana Akizuki
- Takami Morioka
- Satoru Fukasaku
- Tatsunori Hokuto
- Yoichi Kikukawa
- Masumi Okada as Ozaki
- Hideji Ōtaki
- Mariko Fuji
- Kenjiro Shinozuka as himself – Shinozuka placed 2nd in Paris-Dakar’s 1988 edition, and eventually achieved 1st place in 1997.
- Yosuke Natsuki as Mitsubishi Citizen’s Director – As a rally driver, Natsuki participated twice in the real-life Dakar Rally and served as manager of Team Mitsubishi from 1987 to 1993 (Shinozuka was part of the team during Natsuki's tenure).
- Alain Cuny as Don Macine
- Jean-Claude Drouot
- Ryō Ikebe as Nakazawa
- Lazzaro Calcagno

== Production ==
Umi e is similar to an earlier Kurahara production, Safari 5000 (1969), which was also an epic-length film about a rally raid in Africa (specifically, the Safari Rally).

The film was shot in multiple countries, including Japan, Finland, Italy, France, Spain, Algeria, Niger, Senegal and various locations in North Africa including the Ténéré desert. Extensive filming took place on location at the actual Paris-Dakar Rally sites. Cinematographers Tsuguzo Matsumae, Kikuma Muneta and Tatsuo Mori assisted with on-location shooting.

== Music ==
Actor and musician Ryudo Uzaki co-starred in the film and also co-composed its score with Shūichi Chino. The film's theme song is "Rose Des Vents" (lit. "The Rose of the Wind") by Pierre Barouh. In addition, the film features the track "Donde Esta Corazon" composed by Luis Martinez Serrano. The soundtrack was released by Meldac in June 1988.

All music is composed by Ryudo Uzaki and Shūichi Chino (except for "Donde Esta Corazon"):

No.	Title	Length
1.	"To the Sea: See You - Overture a Bientot"	3:14
2.	"Night in Versailles"	1:33
3.	"Race is On"	3:40
4.	"Crescent"	1:25
5.	"Heat & Dust"	2:26
6.	"The Mailed Memoire"	2:42
7.	"Rose Des Vents - The Rose of the Wind (instrumental)"	3:26
8.	"Northland"	3:27
9.	"Rose Des Vents - The Rose of the Wind (instrumental - piano)"	3:47
10.	"Northland (orchestral version)"	3:10
11.	"Donde Esta Corazon"	2:33
12.	"Dead Heat in Sahara"	2:29
13.	"Rose Des Vents - The Rose of the Wind"	3:58
Total length:		37:54

== Vehicles ==
Multiple trucks, cars and motorcycles are featured in the film, including several custom-built off-road vehicles, SUVs and sports cars. Featured brands include BMW, Honda, Kawasaki, Land Rover, Mercedes-Benz, Mitsubishi, Peugeot, Saab, Suzuki and Toyota, among others:

- Cagiva Elefant 750
- 1988 DAF 95 TurboTwin X1
- 1974 Dino 308 GT4
- 1988 BMW Ecureuil 1000 ERS
- Honda CBX750 Horizon
- Honda NXR750
- 1987 Kawasaki KLR650
- 1984 Land-Rover 110
- Land-Rover Range Rover Series I
- 1988 LIAZ 111.154 D
- 1985 Mercedes-Benz 2628 NG
- 1988 Mercedes-Benz 280 GE W460
- 1986 Mercedes-Benz S-Class
- 1988 Merlin Nomada 500
- 1985, 1987 and 1988 Mitsubishi Pajeros
- 1986 Mitsubishi Debonair V
- 1988 Mitsubishi Mirage C50
- 1987 Nissan Terrano WD21
- 1988 Pegaso 7223
- 1988 Pegaso Troner 2236
- 1949 Peugeot 203
- 1987 Peugeot 205 Turbo 16 Grand Raid
- 1988 Suzuki DR 600 R
- 1988 Suzuki DR-Z 820
- 1981 Saab 900
- 1985 Saab 9000
- Peugeot P4
- 1975 Porsche 911 Turbo
- Renault C 29
- 1986 Volkswagen LT 4x4
- Tatra 815
- 1981 and 1985 Toyota Land Cruisers

== Release ==
Umi e, See You was theatrically released by Toho on May 18, 1988, in Japan.

Due to the film's running time of 2 hours and 54 minutes, it was released on VHS as a two-volume set. The film was later released on DVD.

== Awards ==
Editor Akira Suzuki won the 12th Japan Academy Award for Best Editing for his work on Umi e and four other films in 1988: The Silk Road, Kamu onna (also known as Love Bites Back), Ikidomari no Banka: Break Out and A Taxing Woman's Return.
