= Akira Suzuki (director) =

Japanese editor and novelist (1961-)

Akira Suzuki (すずき あきら, Suzuki Akira), also releasing works under the pseudonym Doitsu Suzuki (鈴木 ドイツ, Suzuki Doitsu), is a Japanese film and anime director/editor and manga author. He was born in Sapporo, Hokkaidō.

In 1988, Suzuki won the 12th Japan Academy Film Prize for Best Editing, for his work on five films: Umi e, See You, A Taxing Woman's Return, The Silk Road, Kamu onna (also known as Love Bites Back) and Ikidomari no Banka: Break Out.

As a manga author, Suzuki works with the labels HJ Bunko and MF Bunko J.
