= List of Japanese films of 1960 =

This is a list of films released in Japan in 1960. In 1960, there were 7457 movie theatres in Japan, with 5132 showing only domestic films and 1531 showing both domestic and imported films. In total, there were 547 Japanese films released in 1960. In total, domestic films grossed 31,065 million yen in 1960.

== List of films ==
Japanese films released in 1960
Title	Japanese Title	Release date	Director	Cast	Genre	Notes
Marine Snow	マリン・スノー	1960.__.__	Hiroshi Manabe			
	今日もまた過ぎた	1960.__.__	Masao Adachi			
When a Woman Loves	「通夜の客」より わが愛	1960.01.03	Heinosuke Gosho			
	セクシー・サイン 好き好き好き	1960.01.03	Kōji Shima			
Benten, The Thief	ひばり十八番 弁天小僧	1960.01.03	Yasushi Sasaki		Jidai-geki	
	刑事物語 東京の迷路	1960.01.03	Isamu Kosugi			
	口笛が流れる港町	1960.01.03	Buichi Saitō			
Spring Dreams	春の夢	1960.01.03	Keisuke Kinoshita			
	女奴隷船	1960.01.03	Yoshiki Onoda			
Dai Tengu Shutsugen	大天狗出現	1960.01.03	Masaki Mōri		Jidai-geki	
Two Musashis	二人の武蔵	1960.01.03	Kunio Watanabe		Jidai-geki	
Road of Chivalry	任侠中仙道	1960.01.03	Sadatsugu Matsuda		Jidai-geki	
The Five Jolly Thieves	天下の大泥棒 白浪五人男	1960.01.03	Kozo Saeki	Hisaya Morishige, Frankie Sakai, Achako	Comedy	
The Last Gunfight	暗黒街の対決	1960.01.03	Kihachi Okamoto	Toshiro Mifune, Tsuruta Koji, Yoko Tsukasa	Yakuza / Thriller	
	悪魔のためいき	1960.01.09	Motomu Ida			
Bored Hatamoto: Island of no Return	旗本退屈男 謎の幽霊島	1960.01.09	Yasushi Sasaki		Jidai-geki	
	競艶お役者変化	1960.01.09	Gorō Kadono			
	銀座のお兄ちゃん挑戦す	1960.01.09	Yoshitarō Nomura			
Peacock Secrets	孔雀秘帖	1960.01.09	Kōkichi Uchide		Jidai-geki	
	傷だらけの掟	1960.01.09	Yutaka Abe			
	昭和34年度九州場所熱戦譜 新大関羽黒岩優勝十五番	1960.01.09	Torahiko Ise [composition]			
Sararigaru tokuhon - Muda-guchi, Kage-guchi, Herazu-guchi	サラリーガール読本 むだ口 かげ口 へらず口	1960.01.09	Eiji Iwashiro	Kenji Sahara, Yumi Shirakawa, Sonomi Nakajima	Comedy	
Three Dolls and Three Guys	侍とお姐ちゃん	1960.01.09	Toshio Sugie	Reiko Dan, Sonomi Nakajima, Noriko Shigeyama		
	0線の女狼群	1960.01.13	Akira Miwa			
Black Line	黒線地帯	1960.01.13	Teruo Ishii	Shigeru Amachi, Kyôko Katsura, Yôko Mihara	Crime	
Sen-Hime Goten	千姫御殿	1960.01.14	Kenji Misumi		Jidai-geki	
Jokyo	女経	1960.01.14	Kōzaburō Yoshimura, Kon Ichikawa, Yasuzo Masumura			
	事件記者 時限爆弾	1960.01.15	Tokujirō Yamazaki			
Tange Sazen: The Mysterious Sword	丹下左膳 妖刀濡れ燕	1960.01.15	Sadatsugu Matsuda		Jidai-geki	
	鉄火場の風	1960.01.15	Yōichi Ushihara			
Samurai Vagabonds	殿さま弥次喜多	1960.01.15	Tadashi Sawashima		Jidai-geki	
	二度とこないぞ青春は	1960.01.15	Hiroo Ikeda			
	恋人	1960.01.15	Noboru Nakamura			
Shin santo juyaku-Tabi to onna to sakei no maki	新・三等重役 旅と女と酒の巻	1960.01.15	Masanori Kakei	Hisaya Morishige, Michiyo Aratama, Keiju Kobayashi	Comedy	
When a Woman Ascends the Stairs	女が階段を上る時	1960.01.15	Mikio Naruse	Hideko Takamine, Masayuki Mori, Daisuke Katō	Drama	
	35年初場所大相撲 前半戦	1960.01.21	Torahiko Ise [composition]			
	天下の快男児 万年太郎	1960.01.21	Tsuneo Kobayashi			
The Three Magicians	忍術武者修行	1960.01.21	Seiichi Fukuda		Jidai-geki / Ninja	
Yakoteki Hanafubuki Ichiban Matoi	野狐笛 花吹雪一番纏	1960.01.21	Shōji Matsumura		Jidai-geki	
	雑草のような命	1960.01.22	Eisuke Takizawa			
	危険な誘惑	1960.01.23	Satoru Kobayashi			
	痛快なる花婿	1960.01.26	Kenkichi Hara			
Sleeping with a Long Sword	抱寝の長脇差	1960.01.26	Tatsuo Ōsone		Jidai-geki	
	35年初場所大相撲 後半戦	1960.01.27	Torahiko Ise [composition]			
	街に出た野獣	1960.01.27	Ryōichi Yamanouchi			
	警視庁物語 深夜の130列車	1960.01.27	Masuichi Iizuka			
	拳銃の掟	1960.01.27	Mitsuo Murayama			
Nihatsume Ha Jigoku Yukidaze	二発目は地獄行きだぜ	1960.01.27	Shigehiro Ozawa			
Gendai Sarariiman-Renai bushido	現代サラリーマン 恋愛武士道	1960.01.27	Shue Matsubayashi	Akira Kubo, Makoto Sato, Tatsuyoshi Ehara	Comedy	
Kuroi hanabira	黒い花びら	1960.01.27	Shunkai Mizuho	Hiroshi Mizuhara, Kumi Mizuno, Kin Sugai		
Take Aim at the Police Van	13号待避線より その護送車を狙え	1960.01.27	Seijun Suzuki	Michitaro Mizushima, Mari Shiraki, Misako Watanabe		
The Wandering Princess	流転の王妃	1960.01.27	Kinuyo Tanaka	Machiko Kyō, Eiji Funakoshi	Romance	
	大虐殺	1960.01.30	Kiyoshi Komori			
	やくざの詩	1960.01.31	Toshio Masuda		Yakuza	
	朱の花粉	1960.02.02	Hideo Ōba			
	彼女だけが知っている	1960.02.02	Osamu Takahashi			
Beyond the Hills	山のかなたに	1960.02.02	Eizo Sugawa	Akira Takarada, Yumi Shirakawa, Yosuke Natsuki		
Boku wa dokushin shain	僕は独身社員	1960.02.02	Kengo Furusawa	Makoto Sato, Kenji Sahara, Mickey Curtis	Comedy	
Waka Zakura Senryo Yari	花桜千両槍	1960.02.03	Toshikazu Kōno		Jidai-geki	
	事件記者 狙われた十代	1960.02.03	Tokujirō Yamazaki			
	特ダネ三十時間 女の牙	1960.02.03	Eijirō Wakabayashi			
Buried Treasure	風雲将棋谷	1960.02.03	Katsuhiko Tasaka		Jidai-geki	
Good-for Nothing	ろくでなし	1960.02.06	Yoshishige Yoshida	Masahiko Tsugawa, Hizuru Takachiho, Yûsuke Kawazu, Junichiro Yamashita	Crime	
	生きている日本列島	1960.02.07	Taisuke Nishio, Shigeo Watanabe			
	俺は欺されない	1960.02.07	Takumi Furukawa			
Chivalrous Child of Edo	大江戸の侠児	1960.02.07	Tai Katō		Jidai-geki	
	爆弾を抱く女怪盗	1960.02.07	Michiyoshi Doi			
	特ダネ三十時間 白昼の脅迫	1960.02.09	Eijirō Wakabayashi			
Hito mo arukeba	人も歩けば	1960.02.09	Yuzo Kawashima	Frankie Sakai, Keiko Awaji, Chitose Kobayashi	Comedy	
	あゝ特別攻撃隊	1960.02.10	Yoshio Inoue			
	飢えた牙	1960.02.10	Kiyoshi Horiike			
	虹之介乱れ刃	1960.02.10	Masateru Nishiyama			
	四万人の目撃者	1960.02.12	Manao Horiuchi			
	大利根無情	1960.02.12	Kunio Matoi		Jidai-geki	
The Wild Lord	あらくれ大名	1960.02.14	Kōkichi Uchide		Jidai-geki	
	まぼろし探偵 地底人の襲来	1960.02.14	Ryūtarō Kondō			
	刑事物語 殺人者を挙げろ	1960.02.14	Isamu Kosugi			
	拳銃無頼帖 抜き射ちの竜	1960.02.14	Hiroshi Noguchi			
	地下帝国の死刑室	1960.02.14	Kyōtarō Namiki			
Rakugo tengoku shinshiroku	落語天国紳士録	1960.02.14	Nobuo Aoyagi	Kenichi "Enoken" Enomoto, Roppa Furukawa, Kingoro Yanagiya	Comedy	
Sarariiman goikencho-Otoko no ichidaiji	サラリーマン御意見帖 男の一大事	1960.02.14	Seiji Maruyama	Keiju Kobayashi, Daisuke Katō, Sonomi Nakajima	Comedy	
Nankoku Taiheiki Hiei no Chikemuri	南国太平記 比叡の血煙り	1960.02.16	Ryūta Akimoto		Jidai-geki	
Nuregami's Violent Travels	濡れ髪喧嘩旅	1960.02.17	Kazuo Mori		Jidai-geki	
	若手三羽烏 女難旅行	1960.02.19	Tsuneo Tabata			
	伴淳の駐在日記	1960.02.19	Ryōsuke Kurahashi			
	「キャンパス110番」より 学生野郎と娘たち	1960.02.21	Kō Nakahira			
	美男買います	1960.02.21	Morihei Magatani			
The Forbidden Scoop	非情都市	1960.02.21	Hideo Suzuki	Tatsuya Mihashi, Yoko Tsukasa, Tadao Nakamaru	Drama	
Nankoku Taiheiki Satsuma no Noroshi	南国太平記 薩摩の狼火	1960.02.23	Ryūta Akimoto		Jidai-geki	
Yakuza of Ina	弥太郎笠	1960.02.23	Masahiro Makino		Jidai-geki	
	影のない妖婦	1960.02.24	Motomu Ida			
	嫌い嫌い嫌い	1960.02.24	Hiromu Edagawa			
	明日から大人だ	1960.02.24	Haruo Harada			
Echigo Lion Festival	越後獅子祭	1960.02.26	Kunio Watanabe		Jidai-geki	
	断崖に立つ女	1960.02.26	Tsuruo Iwama			
Girls Without Return Tickets	女体渦巻島	1960.02.27	Teruo Ishii	Yôko Mihara, Teruo Yoshida, Shigeru Amachi, Masayo Banri	Crime	
	海から来た流れ者	1960.02.28	Tokujirō Yamazaki			
The Poem of the Blue Star	嵐を呼ぶ楽団	1960.02.28	Umetsugu Inoue	Akira Takarada, Izumi Yukimura, Tadao Takashima	Musical	
Sazae-san's Baby	サザエさんの赤ちゃん誕生	1960.02.28	Nobuo Aoyagi	Chiemi Eri, Hiroshi Koizumi, Kamatari Fujiwara		
Case of Umon: Hell's Windmill	右門捕物帖 地獄の風車	1960.03.01	Tadashi Sawashima		Jidai-geki	
Perilous G-Men	危うしGメン 暗黒街の野獣	1960.03.01	Masamitsu Igayama		Yakuza	
Bloody Account of Jirocho: Showdown Under the Autumn Leaves	次郎長血笑記 秋葉の対決	1960.03.01	Eiichi Kudō		Jidai-geki	
Heiji Zenigata Detective Story: Beautiful Spider	銭形平次捕物控 美人蜘蛛	1960.03.01	Kenji Misumi		Jidai-geki	
	続べらんめえ芸者	1960.03.01	Eiichi Koishi			
Invisible Goblin	透明天狗	1960.03.01	Mitsuo Kōzu		Jidai-geki	
	十代の狼	1960.03.02	Mitsuo Wakasugi			
	次郎物語	1960.03.04	Masao Nozaki			
	大いなる愛の彼方に	1960.03.04	Tetsurō Ōno			
	若社長と爆発娘	1960.03.06	Toshirō Ōmi			
	白銀城の対決	1960.03.06	Buichi Saitō			
	まぼろし峠	1960.03.08	Sugio Fujiwara		Jidai-geki	
Bloody Account of Jirocho: Dochu Raid	次郎長血笑記 殴り込み道中	1960.03.08	Eiichi Kudō		Jidai-geki	
	女は抵抗する	1960.03.08	Tarō Yuge			
Sashichi Detective Story: The Mask of Wisdom	人形佐七捕物帖 般若の面	1960.03.08	Daisuke Yamazaki		Jidai-geki	
	大いなる旅路	1960.03.08	Hideo Sekikawa			
Ginza Tomboy	銀座退屈娘	1960.03.08	Kajiro Yamamoto	Sonomi Nakajima, Hiroshi Koizumi, Kingoro Yanagiya	Comedy	
	刑事物語 灰色の暴走	1960.03.09	Isamu Kosugi			
	江戸の顔役	1960.03.13	Kinya Sakai		Jidai-geki	
	女死刑囚の脱獄	1960.03.13	Nobuo Nakagawa			
	命との対決	1960.03.13	Tatsuo Sakai			
	六三制愚連隊	1960.03.13	Katsumi Nishikawa			
The Curio Master	珍品堂主人	1960.03.13	Shiro Toyoda	Hisaya Morishige, Chikage Awashima, Nobuko Otowa	Comedy	
The Lost Alibi	黒い画集 あるサラリーマンの証言	1960.03.13	Hiromichi Horikawa	Keiju Kobayashi, Chisako Hara, Masao Oda	Drama	
	ずべ公天使	1960.03.15	Shigehiro Ozawa			
Official With Tattoo	御存じいれずみ判官	1960.03.15	Yasushi Sasaki		Jidai-geki	
	男の挑戦	1960.03.15	Shōichi Shimazu			
	まぼろし峠 完結篇	1960.03.15	Sugio Fujiwara		Jidai-geki	
A Lady's Gambler	よさこい三度笠	1960.03.16	Kimiyoshi Yasuda		Jidai-geki	
	街の噂も三十五日	1960.03.16	Mitsuo Murayama			
	香港秘令0号	1960.03.16	Ren Yoshimura			
	黄色いさくらんぼ	1960.03.18	Yoshitarō Nomura			
	白い波濤	1960.03.18	Tsuneo Tabata			
	ノック・ダウン 打倒	1960.03.20	Akinori Matsuo			
	生首奉行と鬼大名	1960.03.20	Yoshiki Onoda		Jidai-geki	
Sashichi Detective Story: Death of a Beautiful Woman in the Darkness	人形佐七捕物帖 くらやみ坂の死美人	1960.03.22	Daisuke Yamazaki		Jidai-geki	
Mito Komon and the Abominable Giant Monks	水戸黄門漫遊記 怪魔八尺坊主	1960.03.22	Kinnosuke Fukada		Jidai-geki	
	風小僧 風雲虹ケ谷	1960.03.22	Mutsumi Nakaki		Jidai-geki	
Ronin Ichiba Asayake Tengu	浪人市場 朝やけ天狗	1960.03.22	Shōji Matsumura		Jidai-geki	
Wakai suhada	若い素肌	1960.03.22	Tetsuhiro Kawasaki	Mie Hama, Yuriko Hoshi, Michiyo Aratama		
A Man Blown by the Wind	からっ風野郎	1960.03.23	Yasuzō Masumura			
	東京の女性	1960.03.23	Shigeo Tanaka			
Intimidation	ある脅迫	1960.03.23	Koreyoshi Kurahara	Nobuo Kaneko, Mari Shiraki, Akira Nishimura		
	35年大相撲春場所 俊鋭王座を狙う	1960.03.24	Torahiko Ise [composition]			
	外濠殺人事件	1960.03.25	Hiroo Ikeda			
Yagyu Travel Journal: Dragon Tiger Killing Sword	柳生旅日記 龍虎活殺剣	1960.03.25	Ryō Hagiwara	Jūshirō Konoe, Miki Mori, Misako Mori	Jidai-geki	
	銀座旋風児 目撃者は彼奴だ	1960.03.26	Hiroshi Noguchi			
	三人の女強盗	1960.03.26	Satoru Kobayashi			
Ten Duels of Young Shingo: Part III	新吾十番勝負 第三部	1960.03.27	Sadatsugu Matsuda	Hashizō Ōkawa, Ryūtarō Ōtomo, Yumiko Hasegawa	Jidai-geki	
Ishimatsu the One-Eyed Avenger	ひばりの森の石松	1960.03.29	Tadashi Sawashima		Jidai-geki	
Sandy Cruise	砂絵呪縛	1960.03.29	Masahiko Izawa		Jidai-geki	
Young Swordsman on the White Horse: Duel at Nanban-ji Temple	白馬童子 南蛮寺の決斗	1960.03.29	Mutsumi Nakaki		Jidai-geki	
The Gambling Samurai	国定忠治	1960.03.29	Senkichi Taniguchi	Toshiro Mifune, Daisuke Katō, Michiyo Aratama	Jidai-geki	
Saraiiman shusse taikoki · kanketsuhen-Hanamuko-bucho No. 1	サラリーマン出世太閤記 花婿部長No．1	1960.03.29	Masanori Kakei	Keiju Kobayashi, Reiko Dan, Ikio Sawamura	Comedy	
	闇に光る眼	1960.03.30	Masahisa Sunohara			
	新二等兵物語 敵中横断の巻	1960.04.01	Seiichi Fukuda			
	太平洋戦争 謎の戦艦陸奥	1960.04.01	Kiyoshi Komori		Jidai-geki	
	予科練物語 紺碧の空遠く	1960.04.01	Kazuo Inoue			
	あじさいの歌	1960.04.02	Eisuke Takizawa			
	殴りつける十代	1960.04.05	Toshirō Suzuki			
	白い崖	1960.04.05	Tadashi Imai			
	秘密	1960.04.05	Miyoji Ieki			
Kunisada Chuji: Akagi's Lullaby	浪曲国定忠治 赤城の子守唄	1960.04.05	Taizō Fuyushima		Jidai-geki	
Beastly Sleep	けものの眠り	1960.04.06	Seijun Suzuki			
	暁の翼	1960.04.06	Sōkichi Tomimoto			
	今夜の恋に生きるんだ	1960.04.06	Ryōichi Yamanouchi			
Yurei Koban	幽霊小判	1960.04.06	Akira Inoue		Jidai-geki	
	男が血を見たとき	1960.04.09	Akira Miwa			
Bakusho Itohan nikki	爆笑嬢はん日記	1960.04.10	Jukichi Takemae	Kenji Sahara, Keiko Yanagawa, Mie Hama	Comedy	
Secret of the Telegian	電送人間	1960.04.10	Jun Fukuda	Kōji Tsuruta, Yumi Shirakawa, Yoshio Tsuchiya	Science fiction	
Hatamoto To Banzuiin Otoko no Taiketsu	旗本と幡随院 男の対決	1960.04.12	Kinnosuke Fukada		Jidai-geki	
	刑事物語 銃声に浮ぶ顔	1960.04.12	Isamu Kosugi			
	拳銃を磨く男 呪われた顔	1960.04.12	Masamitsu Igayama			
	蛇神魔殿	1960.04.12	Eiichi Kudō		Jidai-geki	
Young Swordsman on the White Horse: Duel at Nanban-ji Temple Part 2	白馬童子 南蛮寺の決斗 完結篇	1960.04.12	Mutsumi Nakaki		Jidai-geki	
	ぼんち	1960.04.13	Kon Ichikawa			
	海の恋人たち	1960.04.13	Sotoji Kimura			
	扉を叩く子	1960.04.13	Yoshio Inoue			
	黒潮秘聞 地獄の百万両	1960.04.15	Ryō Hagiwara		Jidai-geki	
One-Way Ticket for Love	恋の片道切符	1960.04.15	Masahiro Shinoda			
	東洋の旅	1960.04.16				
	邪魔者は消せ	1960.04.16	Yōichi Ushihara			
	性と人間	1960.04.16	Kenta Kimoto			
Ten Duels of Young Shingo: Saga Conclusion	新吾十番勝負 完結篇	1960.04.16	Sadatsugu Matsuda	Hashizō Ōkawa, Ryūtarō Ōtomo, Yumiko Hasegawa	Jidai-geki	
	痴人の愛	1960.04.17	Keigo Kimura			
The Happicoat Comedian	羽織の大将	1960.04.17	Yasuki Chiba	Frankie Sakai, Reiko Dan, Daisuke Katō	Comedy	
Showdown on Pier No. 3	第三波止場の決闘	1960.04.17	Kozo Saeki	Akira Takarada, Tatsuya Mihashi, Akemi Kita	Crime thriller	
	影を捨てた男	1960.04.19	Motomu Ida			
	俺から行くぞ	1960.04.19	Yasushi Sasaki			
	地獄の渡り者	1960.04.19	Satoru Ainoda			
Rokyoku Kunisada Chuji Chikemuri Shinshuji	浪曲国定忠治 血煙り信州路	1960.04.19	Taizō Fuyushima		Jidai-geki	
	大穴	1960.04.22	Seiichirō Uchikawa			
	秘境ヒマラヤ	1960.04.22	Tadashi Nakamura [composition]			
	殺されるのは御免だ	1960.04.23	Isao Hara			
	渡り鳥いつまた帰る	1960.04.23	Buichi Saitō			
Hibari Juhachi-Ban: Ojo-Kichiza	ひばり十八番 お嬢吉三	1960.04.26	Yasushi Sasaki		Jidai-geki	
Bright and Cloudy Days	照る日くもる日	1960.04.26	Kōkichi Uchide		Jidai-geki	
	多羅尾伴内 七つの顔の男だぜ	1960.04.26	Shigehiro Ozawa			
	波止場野郎	1960.04.26	Eiichi Koishi			
Shin santo juyaku-Atarumo hake no maki	新・三等重役 当るも八卦の巻	1960.04.26	Toshio Sugie	Hisaya Morishige, Michiyo Aratama, Keiju Kobayashi	Comedy	
The Storm of the Pacific	ハワイ・ミッドウェイ大海空戦 太平洋の嵐	1960.04.26	Shue Matsubayashi	Yosuke Natsuki, Misa Uehara, Aiko Mimasu	War	
	勝利と敗北	1960.04.27	Umetsugu Inoue			
	白い閃光	1960.04.27	Takumi Furukawa			
The Demon of Mount Oe	大江山酒天童子	1960.04.27	Tokuzo Tanaka	Kazuo Hasegawa, Raizo Ichikawa, Shintaro Katsu	Jidai-geki	
	バナナ	1960.04.29	Minoru Shibuya			
Yellow Line	黄線地帯	1960.04.29	Teruo Ishii	Teruo Yoshida, Yôko Mihara, Shigeru Amachi	Crime	
	銀嶺の王者	1960.04.29	Yoshiaki Banshō			
	青年の樹	1960.04.29	Toshio Masuda			
	美しき別れの歌	1960.05.01	Kenjirō Morinaga			
	消えた密航船	1960.05.03	Shinji Murayama			
	青空街道	1960.05.03	Junichi Fujita		Jidai-geki	
	素っ飛び小僧	1960.05.03	Katsumi Nishikawa			
Tenpo Snow Anthology: Passage Through Hell	天保六花撰 地獄の花道	1960.05.03	Masahiro Makino		Jidai-geki	
Bright and Cloudy Days Pt. 2	照る日くもる日 後篇	1960.05.03	Kōkichi Uchide		Jidai-geki	
	肉体の野獣	1960.05.07	Keinosuke Tsuchiya			
Wanderer's Dice	さいころ無宿	1960.05.10	Kōkichi Uchide		Jidai-geki	
	殺られてたまるか	1960.05.10	Eijirō Wakabayashi		Yakuza	
	大空の無法者	1960.05.10	Shōichi Shimazu			
	青空街道 完結篇	1960.05.10	Junichi Fujita		Jidai-geki	
Kyosai To Sosaini Eiko Are	恐妻党総裁に栄光あれ	1960.05.10	Nobuo Aoyagi	Tadao Takashima, Yumi Shirkawa, Asami Kuji	Comedy	
The Parting	別離の歌	1960.05.10	Shunkai Mizuho	Hiroshi Mizuhara, Kumi Mizuno, Tadao Takashima		
Three Female Racketeers	お嬢さん三度笠	1960.05.11	Kimiyoshi Yasuda		Jidai-geki	
	襲われた手術室	1960.05.11	Tsuyoshi Abe			
Hitohada Jumon	人肌呪文	1960.05.11	Bin Kato		Jidai-geki	
	特捜班5号	1960.05.11	Takashi Nomura			
	伊豆の踊子	1960.05.13	Yoshirō Kawazu			
	続次郎物語 若き日の怒り	1960.05.13	Masao Nozaki			
	拳銃無頼帖 電光石火の男	1960.05.14	Hiroshi Noguchi			
	素晴らしき遺産	1960.05.14	Masahisa Sunohara			
Man's Ambition	酒と女と槍	1960.05.15	Tomu Uchida		Jidai-geki	
Orang-utang	オラウータンの知恵	1960.05.15	Tomoko Fujiwara		Documentary	
The Sea of Erabu	エレブの海	1960.05.15	Nishio Nensuke		Documentary	
The Wayside Pebble	路傍の石	1960.05.15	Seiji Hisamatsu	Setsuko Hara, Hisaya Morishige, Tatsuya Mihashi	Drama	
Travel Hat Style: Violent Road	あやめ笠 喧嘩街道	1960.05.17	Tai Katō		Jidai-geki	
	拳銃を磨く男 深夜の死角	1960.05.17	Masamitsu Igayama			
	爆発娘罷り通る	1960.05.17	Toshirō Ōmi			
	風小僧 風流河童剣	1960.05.17	Mutsumi Nakaki		Jidai-geki	
	35年大相撲夏場所 前半戦	1960.05.18	Torahiko Ise [composition]			
	すれすれ	1960.05.18	Shunkai Mizuho			
	歌行燈	1960.05.18	Teinosuke Kinugasa			
	甲賀の密使	1960.05.18	Senshō Nishizawa			
	いろはにほへと	1960.05.20	Noboru Nakamura			
	番頭はんと丁稚どん	1960.05.20	Kinya Sakai			
	女と命をかけてブッ飛ばせ	1960.05.21	Morihei Magatani			
	静かな脱獄者	1960.05.21	Yutaka Abe			
	僕は泣いちっち	1960.05.21	Kiyoshi Horiike			
Daughters, Wives and a Mother	娘・妻・母	1960.05.21	Mikio Naruse	Setsuko Hara, Masayuki Mori, Hideko Takamine		
Ooka Seidan: Mazo-hen	大岡政談 魔像篇	1960.05.22	Toshikazu Kōno		Jidai-geki	
Kamitsuita Wakadanna	噛みついた若旦那	1960.05.22	Nobuo Aoyagi	Tadao Takashima, Fumiyo Fujimoto, Kingoro Yanagiya		
	ボス表へ出ろ	1960.05.24	Masamitsu Igayama			
	風小僧 流星剣の舞	1960.05.24	Mutsumi Nakaki		Jidai-geki	
	第三の疑惑	1960.05.24	Kiyoshi Saeki			
	35年大相撲夏場所 後半戦	1960.05.25	Torahiko Ise [composition]			
	おさい権三 燃ゆる恋草	1960.05.27	Kunio Watanabe			
	死者との結婚	1960.05.27	Osamu Takahashi			
	トップ屋取材帳 消えた弾痕	1960.05.28	Motomu Ida			
	海を渡る波止場の風	1960.05.28	Tokujirō Yamazaki			
Decisive Battle at Kuroda Castle	御存知黒田ぶし 決戦黒田城	1960.05.28	Gorō Kadono		Jidai-geki	
Sarariiman goikencho-Shusse muyo	サラリーマン御意見帖 出世無用	1960.05.28	Eiji Iwashiro	Keiju Kobayashi, Kumi Mizuno, Sonomi Nakajima	Comedy	
Hanjiro of Kusama: Wanderer in the Mist	草間の半次郎 霧の中の渡り鳥	1960.05.29	Kōkichi Uchide		Jidai-geki	
	おれたちの真昼	1960.05.31	Tsuneo Kobayashi			
Momotaro Samurai: The Fighting King of Edo	桃太郎侍 江戸の修羅王	1960.05.31	Kinnosuke Fukada		Jidai-geki	
	男は騙される	1960.06.01	Kōji Shima			
Jirocho the Chivalrous	続次郎長富士	1960.06.01	Kazuo Mori	Kazuo Hasegawa, Raizo Ichikawa, Shintaro Katsu	Jidai-geki	
	しかも彼等は行く	1960.06.03	Tetsurō Ōno			
Cruel Story of Youth	青春残酷物語	1960.06.03	Nagisa Oshima	Yusuke Kawazu, Miyuki Kuwano, Yoshiko Kuga	Drama	
	俺は銀座の騎兵隊	1960.06.04	Hiroshi Noguchi			
	君は狙われている	1960.06.04	Motomu Ida			
	黒い乳房	1960.06.04	Michiyoshi Doi			
Unwieldy Brothers	暴れん坊兄弟	1960.06.05	Tadashi Sawashima		Jidai-geki	
	警視庁物語 血液型の秘密	1960.06.07	Masuichi Iizuka			
Momotaro Samurai: The Devil of the Southern Sea	桃太郎侍 南海の鬼	1960.06.07	Kinnosuke Fukada		Jidai-geki	
	浪曲権三と助十 ゆうれい駕籠	1960.06.07	Taizō Fuyushima			
	紅蜥蝪	1960.06.08	Katsuhiko Tasaka			
	流転	1960.06.10	Seiichi Fukuda			
	刑事物語 前科なき拳銃	1960.06.11	Isamu Kosugi			
	皇室と戦争とわが民族	1960.06.11	Kiyoshi Komori		Jidai-geki	
	草花の秘密	1960.06.11	Tarō Andō			
	地図のない町	1960.06.11	Kō Nakahira			
	白い牙	1960.06.11	Heinosuke Gosho			
Traveling with a Long Sword: Camelia in a Travel Hat	旅の長脇差 花笠椿	1960.06.12	Shigehiro Ozawa		Jidai-geki	
	決斗の谷	1960.06.14	Toshirō Suzuki			
	続ずべ公天使 七色の花嫁	1960.06.14	Eiichi Koishi			
	浪曲権三と助十 呪いの置手紙	1960.06.14	Taizō Fuyushima			
	サラリーガール読本 お転婆社員	1960.06.15	Tetsuhiro Kawasaki			
Gentaro Bune	源太郎船	1960.06.15	Kunio Watanabe		Jidai-geki	
	素敵な野郎	1960.06.15	Sōkichi Tomimoto			
Singing in the Sun	太陽を抱け	1960.06.15	Umetsugu Inoue	Akira Takarada, Izumi Yukimura, Tadao Takashima	Musical	
	人間みな兄弟	1960.06.16	Fumio Kamei			
	女の坂	1960.06.17	Kōzaburō Yoshimura			
	俺は流れ星	1960.06.18	Hiroshi Noguchi			
	男の怒りをぶちまけろ	1960.06.18	Akinori Matsuo			
	警視庁物語 聞き込み	1960.06.21	Masuichi Iizuka			
Shinran	親鸞	1960.06.21	Tomotaka Tasaka		Jidai-geki	
	不死身の男	1960.06.21	Satoru Ainoda			
	スパイと貞操	1960.06.22	Tatsuo Yamada			
	犯罪6号地	1960.06.22	Mitsuo Murayama			
Sarariiman Meijiro Sampei-Nyobono kaono maki	サラリーマン目白三平 女房の顔の巻	1960.06.22	Hideo Suzuki	Chishū Ryū, Yōko Mochizuki, Mie Hama	Comedy	
	お嬢さんの散歩道	1960.06.25	Kiyoshi Horiike			
Undercover 0-Line	密航0ライン	1960.06.25	Seijun Suzuki			
Legend of Kasane Swamp	怪談累が淵	1960.06.26	Kimiyoshi Yasuda		Jidai-geki	
	海蛇大名	1960.06.26	Mitsuo Kōzu		Jidai-geki	
	女妖	1960.06.26	Kenji Misumi			
The Blue Beast	青い野獣	1960.06.26	Hiromichi Horikawa	Tatsuya Nakadai, Yoko Tsukasa, Koreya Senda		
The Stolen Kiss	接吻泥棒	1960.06.26	Yuzo Kawashima	Akira Takarada, Reiko Dan, Mitsuko Kusabue	Comedy	
One Armed Fury	遊侠の剣客 片手無念流	1960.06.28	Masahiko Izawa		Jidai-geki	
Bored Hatamoto: Riddle of the Assassin's Group	旗本退屈男 謎の暗殺隊	1960.06.29	Sadatsugu Matsuda		Jidai-geki / Ninja	
	東から来た流れ者	1960.06.29	Atsuto Wada			
Kaibyo Otamagaike	怪猫お玉が池	1960.07.01	Yoshihiro Ishikawa		Jidai-geki	
	刑事物語 小さな目撃者	1960.07.01	Isamu Kosugi			
	私は忘れない	1960.07.01	Manao Horiuchi			
	赤い夕陽の渡り鳥	1960.07.01	Buichi Saitō			
Sarariiman Meijiro Sampei-Teishu no tameiki no maki	サラリーマン目白三平 亭主のためいきの巻	1960.07.05	Hideo Suzuki	Chishū Ryū, Reiko Dan, Yōko Mochizuki	Comedy	
Hibari Torimonocho: Orizuru Kago	ひばり捕物帖 折鶴駕篭	1960.07.06	Eiichi Kudō		Jidai-geki	
	ろくでなし	1960.07.06	Yoshishige Yoshida			
	闇法師	1960.07.06	Ryōsuke Kurahashi			
	十七才の逆襲 暴力をぶっ潰せ	1960.07.06	Shigeaki Hidaka			
	吠えろ岸壁	1960.07.06	Eijirō Wakabayashi			
	35年大相撲名古屋場所 前半戦	1960.07.07	Torahiko Ise [composition]			
	怪談海女幽霊	1960.07.08	Gorō Kadono			
	霧笛が俺を呼んでいる	1960.07.09	Tokujirō Yamazaki			
	三人の顔役	1960.07.10	Umetsugu Inoue			
Shinsengumi: Last Days of the Shogunate	壮烈新選組 幕末の動乱	1960.07.10	Yasushi Sasaki		Jidai-geki	
Scar Yosaburo	切られ与三郎	1960.07.10	Daisuke Itō	Raizo Ichikawa, Keiko Awaji	Jidai-geki / Chambara	
The Lovelorn Geisha	夜の流れ	1960.07.12	Mikio Naruse, Yuzo Kawashima	Yoko Tsukasa, Isuzu Yamada, Yumi Shirakawa	Drama	
Shin santo juyaku-Teishukyoiku no maki	新・三等重役 亭主教育の巻	1960.07.12	Toshio Sugie	Hisaya Morishige, Michiyo Aratama, Daisuke Katō	Comedy	
	まぼろし大名	1960.07.13	Toshikazu Kōno		Jidai-geki	
	浅草姉妹	1960.07.13	Kenjirō Morinaga			
	天下の快男児 突進太郎	1960.07.13	Tsuneo Kobayashi			
	天下を取る	1960.07.13	Yōichi Ushihara			
	35年大相撲名古屋場所 後半戦	1960.07.14	Torahiko Ise [composition]			
	暴れん坊三羽烏	1960.07.14	Yoshiaki Banshō			
	拳銃と驀走	1960.07.15	Satoru Kobayashi			
	禁男の砂 第四話 真夏の情事	1960.07.19	Tsuruo Iwama			
	にっぽんGメン 摩天楼の狼	1960.07.20	Masamitsu Igayama			
	悪魔の札束	1960.07.20	Hideo Sekikawa			
Jirokichi Bayashi Senryo Koban	次郎吉囃子 千両小判	1960.07.20	Hideaki Ōnishi		Jidai-geki	
	若い突風	1960.07.20	Katsumi Nishikawa			
	爆破命令	1960.07.20	Takashi Nomura			
	太陽と血と砂	1960.07.22	Yoshiki Onoda			
The Black Hooded Man in Peril	危うし！快傑黒頭巾	1960.07.24	Shōji Matsumura		Jidai-geki	
	傷ついた野獣	1960.07.24	Tarō Yuge			
	熱い砂	1960.07.24	Shunkai Mizuho			
	喧嘩まつり 江戸っ子野郎と娘たち	1960.07.26	Noboru Ono			
	少年漂流記	1960.07.26	Hideo Sekikawa			
My Friend Death	幽霊繁盛記	1960.07.26	Kozo Saeki	Frankie Sakai, Kyōko Kagawa, Kingoro Yanagiya	Comedy	
Wakadanna funsensu	若旦那奮戦す	1960.07.26	Jukichi Takemae	Tadao Takashima, Keiko Yanagawa, Kenji Sahara	Comedy	
	はったり二挺拳銃	1960.07.29	Seiichi Fukuda			
	日本よいとこ 無鉄砲旅行	1960.07.29	Chisato Ikoma			
	野郎！ 地獄へ行け	1960.07.29	Motomu Ida			
Tokyo Mighty Guy	東京の暴れん坊	1960.07.29	Buichi Saito	Akira Kobayashi, Ruriko Asaoka		
Jigoku	地獄	1960.07.30	Nobuo Nakagawa	Shigeru Amachi, Utako Mitsuya, Yoichi Numata	Horror	
	俺の涙は甘くない	1960.07.31	Haruo Atsuda			
Sashichi Detective Story: The Bloody Underwear	人形佐七捕物帖 血染の肌着	1960.07.31	Daisuke Yamazaki		Jidai-geki	
The Newcomer to Shimizu	清水港に来た男	1960.07.31	Masahiro Makino		Jidai-geki	
	東海道ちゃっきり娘	1960.07.31	Bin Kato			
	まぼろし大名 完結篇	1960.07.31	Toshikazu Kōno		Jidai-geki	
The Spook Cottage	大学の山賊たち	1960.07.31	Kihachi Okamoto	Tsutomu Yamazaki, Akira Kubo, Makoto Sato		
Tell It to the Dolls	お姐ちゃんに任しとキ！	1960.07.31	Masanori Kakei	Reiko Dan, Sonomi Nakajima, Noriko Shigeyama		
	拳銃無頼帖 不敵に笑う男	1960.08.06	Hiroshi Noguchi			
	怪談五十三次	1960.08.07	Kōkichi Uchide		Jidai-geki	
Lord Mito: All Star Version	水戸黄門	1960.08.07	Sadatsugu Matsuda		Jidai-geki	
	続々べらんめえ芸者	1960.08.07	Eiichi Koishi			
Anchin To Kiyohime	安珍と清姫	1960.08.09	Kōji Shima		Jidai-geki	
	鑑賞用男性	1960.08.09	Yoshitarō Nomura			
	太陽の墓場	1960.08.09	Nagisa Ōshima			
	夜は嘘つき	1960.08.09	Shigeo Tanaka			
Yaoya Oshichi-Edo matsuri ichiban musume	八百屋お七 江戸祭り一番娘	1960.08.09	Eiji Iwashiro	Sonomi Nakajima, Ichiro Arishima, Kenji Sahara	Jidai-geki / Comedy	
	喧嘩太郎	1960.08.10	Toshio Masuda			
	暴れん坊大将	1960.08.12	Sotoji Kimura			
Alakazam the Great	西遊記	1960.08.14	Taiji Yabushita, Osamu Tezuka, Daisaku Shirakawa		Musical / Anime	
The Country Doctor	ふんどし医者	1960.08.14	Hiroshi Inagaki	Hisaya Morishige, Setsuko Hara, Yosuke Natsuki	Jidai-geki	
Man Against Man	男対男	1960.08.14	Senkichi Taniguchi	Toshiro Mifune, Ryō Ikebe, Takashi Shimura	Action	
	金語楼の俺は殺し屋だ！	1960.08.16	Isamu Kosugi			
	続少年漂流記	1960.08.16	Hideo Sekikawa			
	野獣の眼	1960.08.16	Eijirō Wakabayashi			
	女獣	1960.08.19	Morihei Magatani			
	疾風小僧	1960.08.21	Katsumi Nishikawa			
	続・番頭はんと丁稚どん	1960.08.21	Kunio Matoi			
Reporters from the Sky	大空の野郎ども	1960.08.21	Kengo Furusawa	Makoto Sato, Yumi Shirakawa, Yosuke Natsuki	Action	
	お夏捕物帳 通り魔	1960.08.23	Ryō Hagiwara			
	この髭百万ドル	1960.08.24	Masahisa Sunohara			
	競艶八剣殿	1960.08.24	Masateru Nishiyama			
	砂漠を渡る太陽	1960.08.24	Kiyoshi Saeki			
	十七才の逆襲 向う見ずの三日間	1960.08.24	Shigeaki Hidaka			
Sashichi Detective Story: Long-Sleeved Kimono Mansion	人形佐七捕物帖 ふり袖屋敷	1960.08.24	Daisuke Yamazaki		Jidai-geki	
	足にさわった女	1960.08.24	Yasuzō Masumura			
	反逆児	1960.08.26	Satoru Kobayashi		Jidai-geki	
	恐怖の記録 戦争はもういやだ	1960.08.27	Osamu Matsuishi [composition]			
	一匹狼	1960.08.27	Yōichi Ushihara			
	花嫁吸血魔	1960.08.27	Kyōtarō Namiki			
Kurobe-Dani No Dai-Kenkyaku	黒部谷の大剣客	1960.08.28	Yasushi Sasaki		Jidai-geki	
Bloody Account of Jirocho: Showdown at Fujimi Pass	次郎長血笑記 富士見峠の対決	1960.08.28	Eiichi Kudō		Jidai-geki	
East Side Street	〓東綺譚	1960.08.28	Shiro Toyoda	Fujiko Yamamoto, Hiroshi Akutagawa, Masao Oda	Drama	
Respect, Flatter, and Love	新・女大学	1960.08.28	Seiji Hisamatsu	Yoko Tsukasa, Keiju Kobayashi, Mitsuko Kusabue		
Youth in Fury	乾いた湖	1960.08.30	Masahiro Shinoda			
	離愁	1960.08.30	Hideo Ōba			
	小雨の夜に散った恋	1960.08.31	Ren Yoshimura			
	神田祭り 喧嘩笠	1960.08.31	Masahiro Makino			
	銀座のどら猫	1960.09.01	Yoshio Inoue			
Queen Bee and the School for Dragons	女王蜂と大学の龍	1960.09.01	Teruo Ishii	Yôko Mihara, Kanjûrô Arashi, Teruo Yoshida, Shigeru Amachi	Crime	
Secrets of a Court Masseur	不知火検校	1960.09.01	Kazuo Mori	Shintaro Katsu, Tamao Nakamura	Jidai-geki	
	南海の狼火	1960.09.03	Tokujirō Yamazaki			
The Warped Ones	狂熱の季節	1960.09.03	Koreyoshi Kurahara	Tamio Kawaji, Noriko Matsumoto, Yuko Chiyo	Drama	
	全国高校野球選手権大会 栄光は君に輝く	1960.09.04	Akira Shiraishi			
	白い粉の恐怖	1960.09.04	Shinji Murayama			
Killing in Yoshiwara	妖刀物語 花の吉原百人斬り	1960.09.04	Tomu Uchida		Jidai-geki	
	十七才の逆襲 俺は昨日の俺じゃない	1960.09.07	Hajime Satō			
	トップ屋を殺せ	1960.09.08	Ten Takahashi			
	元禄女大名	1960.09.09	Kimiyoshi Yasuda		Jidai-geki	
Shirokoya Komako	白子屋駒子	1960.09.09	Kenji Misumi		Jidai-geki	
	親バカ子バカ	1960.09.11	Kinya Sakai			
Honno-ji in Flames	敵は本能寺にあり	1960.09.11	Tatsuo Ōsone		Jidai-geki	
Bloody Account of Jirocho: Raid on Kojin Mountain	次郎長血笑記 殴り込み荒神山	1960.09.13	Eiichi Kudō		Jidai-geki	
	弾丸大将	1960.09.13	Miyoji Ieki		Yakuza	
	風流深川唄	1960.09.13	Sō Yamamura		Jidai-geki	
12 Ounces to Glory	遠い一つの道	1960.09.13	Seiichiro Uchikawa	Ken Ogata, Shogo Shimada, Michiyo Kogure	Drama	
Ushinawareta 16 nen	失われた16年	1960.09.13			Documentary	
	借りは返すぜ	1960.09.14	Takumi Furukawa			
	摩天楼の男	1960.09.14	Takashi Nomura			
The Bad Sleep Well	悪い奴ほどよく眠る	1960.09.15	Akira Kurosawa	Toshirō Mifune, Takeshi Kato, Masayuki Mori	Drama / Yakuza	
	ヌード肉体祭り	1960.09.17	Kenta Kimoto			
	海の情事に賭けろ	1960.09.17	Hiroshi Noguchi			
	裸の谷間	1960.09.17	Satoru Kobayashi			
Journeying Swallows	つばくろ道中	1960.09.18	Toshikazu Kōno		Jidai-geki	
The Pirates	海賊八幡船	1960.09.18	Tadashi Sawashima		Jidai-geki	
The Greedy Old Skin	がめつい奴	1960.09.18	Yasuki Chiba	Aiko Mimasu, Chinatsu Nakayama, Tadao Takashima		
Jiyugaoka fujin	自由ケ丘夫人	1960.09.18	Kozo Saeki	Ryō Ikebe, Michiyo Aratama, Mie Hama	Comedy	
	蛇精の淫	1960.09.19	Morihei Magatani			
	悪人志願	1960.09.20	Takeshi Tamura			
Duel at Hell's Gate	獄門坂の決闘	1960.09.20	Takao Akimoto		Jidai-geki	
	最後の切札	1960.09.20	Yoshitarō Nomura			
	誰よりも君を愛す	1960.09.20	Shigeo Tanaka			
Kizu Senryo	疵千両	1960.09.20	Tokuzō Tanaka		Jidai-geki	
	35年秋場所大相撲 前半戦	1960.09.21	Torahiko Ise [composition]			
	やくざ先生	1960.09.21	Akinori Matsuo		Yakuza	
	マッキンレー征服	1960.09.27	Chōnosuke Ise [composition]			
Shinran Pt. 2	続親鸞	1960.09.27	Tomotaka Tasaka		Jidai-geki	
Anesan nyobo	姉さん女房	1960.09.27	Seiji Maruyama	Keiko Awaji, Mickey Curtis, Yuriko Hoshi	Comedy	
	35年秋場所大相撲 後半戦	1960.09.28	Torahiko Ise [composition]			
	闇を裂く口笛	1960.09.28	Kenjirō Morinaga			
	海底の挑戦者	1960.09.28	Satoru Ainoda			
	気まぐれ鴉	1960.09.28	Bin Kato			
Story of Wandering, Story of Violence	風来物語 あばれ飛車	1960.09.28	Kunio Watanabe			
	俺たちに太陽はない	1960.09.29	Hiroo Ikeda			
	白い肌と黄色い隊長	1960.09.29	Manao Horiuchi			
	十六歳	1960.10.01	Eisuke Takizawa			
	女巌窟王	1960.10.01	Yoshiki Onoda			
The Approach of Autumn	秋立ちぬ	1960.10.01	Mikio Naruse	Nobuko Otowa, Kenzaburo Osawa, Futaba Ichiki		
	ある恋の物語	1960.10.02	Yoshitsugu Nakajima			
	生き抜いた16年 最後の日本兵	1960.10.05	Masuichi Iizuka			
	遙かなる母の顔	1960.10.05	Eiichi Koishi			
	嵐の中の若者たち	1960.10.05	Masamitsu Igayama			
	英雄候補生	1960.10.08	Yōichi Ushihara			
	顔	1960.10.08	Kōji Shima			
	小女妻 恐るべき十六才	1960.10.08	Yūsuke Watanabe			
	轢き逃げ族	1960.10.08	Mitsuo Murayama			
Everything Goes Wrong	すべてが狂ってる	1960.10.08	Seijun Suzuki	Tamio Kawachi, Yoshiko Yatsu, Shinsuke Ashida		
A False Student	偽大学生	1960.10.08	Yasuzo Masumura		Drama	
	血は渇いてる	1960.10.09	Yoshishige Yoshida			
Mighty Shosuke	庄助武勇伝 会津磐梯山	1960.10.09	Sadatsugu Matsuda		Jidai-geki	
Traveling with a Long Sword: Sataro of Izu	旅の長脇差 伊豆の佐太郎	1960.10.09	Kinnosuke Fukada		Jidai-geki	
Night and Fog in Japan	日本の夜と霧	1960.10.09	Nagisa Oshima	Miyuki Kuwano, Fumio Watanabe, Masahiko Tsugawa	Drama	
The Husband Was a Baby	続・姉さん女房 駄々っ子亭主	1960.10.11	Seiji Maruyama	Keiko Awaji, Mickey Curtis, Yuriko Hoshi	Comedy	
The Marriage Bet is on	嫁さがし千両勝負	1960.10.12	Shigehiro Ozawa		Jidai-geki	
	大草原の渡り鳥	1960.10.12	Buichi Saitō			
	鉄道開通88周年記念映画 日本の動脈	1960.10.12	Toshiharu Ōyama			
	激闘の地平線	1960.10.15	Kiyoshi Komori			
Cases of Hanshichi	半七捕物帖 三つの謎	1960.10.16	Yasushi Sasaki		Jidai-geki	
The Romance Bet is on	恋しぐれ千両勝負	1960.10.16	Shigehiro Ozawa		Jidai-geki	
The Angry Sea	地の涯に生きるもの	1960.10.16	Seiji Hisamatsu	Hisaya Morishige, Mitsuko Kusabue, Tsutomu Yamazaki		
Master Fencer Sees the World	がんばれ！盤獄	1960.10.16	Shue Matsubayashi	Keiju Kobayashi, Reiko Dan, Hiroshi Koizumi	Jidai-geki	
	時の氏神 新夫婦読本	1960.10.18	Hiromu Edagawa			
Daibosatsu Pass: Satan's Sword	大菩薩峠	1960.10.18	Kenji Misumi	Raizō Ichikawa, Kojiro Hongo, Tamao Nakamura	Jidai-geki	
	刑事物語 知り過ぎた奴は殺す	1960.10.19	Isamu Kosugi			
	中乗り新三 天竜鴉	1960.10.19	Tatsuo Yamada			
The River Fuefuki	笛吹川	1960.10.19	Keisuke Kinoshita		Jidai-geki	
	第三次世界大戦 四十一時間の恐怖	1960.10.19	Shigeaki Hidaka			
	男の世界だ	1960.10.22	Michiyoshi Doi			
	幌馬車は行く	1960.10.22	Hiroshi Noguchi			
Heavenly Dragon	天竜母恋い笠	1960.10.23	Eiichi Kudō		Jidai-geki	
	不良少女	1960.10.23	Tsuneo Kobayashi			
Kotashi gofusai no Amerika ryoko	皇太子ご夫妻のアメリカ旅行	1960.10.23				
	あした晴れるか	1960.10.26	Kō Nakahira			
	よせよ恋なんて	1960.10.26	Ren Yoshimura			
	野火を斬る兄弟	1960.10.26	Daisuke Yamazaki		Jidai-geki	
	弥次喜多珍道中 中仙道の巻	1960.10.29	Toshirō Ōmi			
Castle of Flames	炎の城	1960.10.30	Tai Katō		Jidai-geki	
	殴り込み艦隊	1960.10.30	Shōichi Shimazu			
	太陽が目にしみる	1960.10.30	Toshio Ōno			
	波の搭	1960.10.30	Noboru Nakamura			
Count on Me	唄祭ロマンス道中	1960.10.30	Kozo Saeki	Chiemi Eri, Tadao Takashima, Ichiro Arishima	Musical	
Westward Desperado	独立愚連隊西へ	1960.10.30	Kihachi Okamoto	Makoto Sato, Kumi Mizuno, Yō zō Kayama	War	
	鎮花祭	1960.11.01	Shunkai Mizuho			
	竜巻小僧	1960.11.01	Katsumi Nishikawa			
Her Brother	おとうと	1960.11.01	Kon Ichikawa	Keiko Kishi, Hiroshi Kawaguchi, Kinuyo Tanaka	Drama	
The Land Mine Clan	地雷火組	1960.11.02	Masahiko Izawa		Jidai-geki	
	社長野郎ども	1960.11.05	Torajirō Saitō			
	こつまなんきん	1960.11.06	Tatsuo Sakai			
	ぽんこつ	1960.11.08	Masaharu Segawa			
	大いなる驀進	1960.11.08	Hideo Sekikawa			
	武器なき斗い	1960.11.08	Satsuo Yamamoto			
	ガラスの中の少女	1960.11.09	Mitsuo Wakasugi			
Sumo Wrestler's Debut	一本刀土俵入	1960.11.09	Kimiyoshi Yasuda		Jidai-geki	
	黄金の掟	1960.11.09	Sugio Fujiwara			
	犯行現場	1960.11.09	Tsuyoshi Abe			
	錆びた鎖	1960.11.12	Buichi Saitō			
	情熱の花	1960.11.12	Kiyoshi Horiike			
	怒号する巨弾	1960.11.12	Yoshihiro Ishikawa			
	明日はいっぱいの果実	1960.11.13	Masao Saitō			
Children of the Miners' Town	筑豊のこどもたち	1960.11.13	Seiichiro Uchikawa	Daisuke Katō, Takeshi Okimura, Hiroshi Koizumi		
Hana no serusuman-Sebiro Sanshiro	花のセールスマン 背広三四郎	1960.11.13	Eiji Iwashiro	Jun Funato, Kenji Sahara, Yumi Shirakawa	Drama	
Late Autumn	秋日和	1960.11.13	Yasujirō Ozu	Setsuko Hara, Yoko Tsukasa, Chishū Ryū	Drama	
Million Koku Ronin	素浪人百万石	1960.11.15	Shōji Matsumura		Jidai-geki	
	特ダネ三十時間 笑う誘拐魔	1960.11.15	Eijirō Wakabayashi			
	大暴れ風来坊	1960.11.16	Tokujirō Yamazaki			
	母桜	1960.11.16	Hiromu Edagawa			
The Land Mine Clan Pt. 2	地雷火組 完結篇	1960.11.16	Masahiko Izawa		Jidai-geki	
Duel at Moonrise	月の出の決闘	1960.11.16	Daisuke Itō	Shintaro Katsu, Tamao Nakamura	Jidai-geki	
	まぼろし探偵 恐怖の宇宙人	1960.11.19	Satoru Kobayashi			
The Soft Touch of Night	赤坂の姉妹 夜の肌	1960.11.19	Yuzo Kawashima	Chikage Awashima, Michiyo Aratama, Tomoko Kawaguchi	Drama	
Anything Goes Three Dolls'Way	お姐ちゃんはツイてるぜ	1960.11.20	Masanori Kakei	Reiko Dan, Tadao Takashima, Noriko Shigeyama	Comedy	
Naughty Young Nobleman	わんぱく公子	1960.11.22	Mitsuo Kōzu		Jidai-geki	
Scarier Than The Devil	森の石松鬼より怖い	1960.11.22	Tadashi Sawashima		Jidai-geki	
Tadanao Kyogo Joki	忠直卿行状記	1960.11.22	Kazuo Mori		Jidai-geki	
	特ダネ三十時間 曲り角の女	1960.11.22	Eijirō Wakabayashi			
	刑事物語 犯行七分前	1960.11.23	Isamu Kosugi			
Shogi Daimyo Dokuro-Hen Maboroshi-Hen	将棋大名 どくろ篇 まぼろし篇	1960.11.23	Hideaki Ōnishi		Jidai-geki	
Go to Hell, Hoodlums!	くたばれ愚連隊	1960.11.23	Seijun Suzuki	Koji Wada, Chikako Hosokawa, Emiko Azuma		
The Naked Island	裸の島	1960.11.23	Kaneto Shindō	Nobuko Otowa, Taiji Tonoyama, Shinji Tanaka	Drama	
	殴り込み女社長	1960.11.26	Torajirō Saitō			
The Morning Breeze of Edo	江戸の朝風	1960.11.29	Hideaki Ōnishi		Jidai-geki	
	男ならやってみろ	1960.11.29	Kiyoshi Saeki			
The 6th Suspect	第六の容疑者	1960.11.29	Umetsugu Inoue	Tatsuya Mihashi, Akira Takarada, Yumi Shirakawa		
Get Them All	みな殺しの歌より 拳銃よさらば	1960.11.29	Eizo Sugawa	Hiroshi Mizuhara, Yukiko Shimzaki, Akihiko Hirata		
	お伝地獄	1960.11.30	Keigo Kimura			
	雨に咲く花	1960.11.30	Yoshitsugu Nakajima			
	弾痕街の友情	1960.11.30	Mitsuo Murayama			
	緋ぼたん浪人	1960.11.30	Kōkichi Uchide			
	浮気のすすめ 女の裏窓	1960.11.30	Yoshiaki Banshō			
Bushido Muzan	武士道無残	1960.11.30	Eitarō Morikawa		Jidai-geki	
	大相撲九州場所 新鋭古豪熱戦集	1960.12.01	Torahiko Ise [composition]			
	まぼろし探偵 幽霊搭の大魔術団	1960.12.03	Satoru Kobayashi			
	拳銃無頼帖 明日なき男	1960.12.03	Hiroshi Noguchi			
Abare Kago	あばれ駕籠	1960.12.06	Shōji Matsumura		Jidai-geki	
	姿なき暴力	1960.12.06	Masuichi Iizuka			
	百万両秘帖 前後篇	1960.12.06	Mutsumi Nakaki			
The Weaker Sex	ああ女難	1960.12.06	Toshio Sugie	Frankie Sakai, Mitsuko Kusabue, Yoshie Mizutani	Comedy	
The Chivalrous Umbrella	剣客春雨傘	1960.12.07	Kunio Watanabe		Jidai-geki	
	都会の空の用心棒	1960.12.07	Takashi Nomura			
Young Lord	薔薇大名	1960.12.07	Kazuo Ikehiro		Jidai-geki	
	東海道非常線警戒	1960.12.10	Tatsuo Yamada			
Sword of Destiny	狐剣は折れず 月影一刀流	1960.12.11	Yasushi Sasaki		Jidai-geki	
Tenka Gomen	天下御免	1960.12.11	Kunio Watanabe		Jidai-geki	
The Human Vapor	ガス人間第一号	1960.12.11	Ishirō Honda	Tatsuya Mihashi, Keiko Sata, Kaoru Yachigusa	Science fiction	
Modern Moneymaking	金づくり太閤記	1960.12.11	Tetsuhiro Kawasaki	Daisuke Katō, Yumi Shirakawa, Ichiro Nakaya	Comedy	
	億万長者	1960.12.13	Tsuneo Kobayashi			
Battle Drum of Tsukuba	遊侠の剣客 つくば太鼓	1960.12.13	Kinnosuke Fukada		Jidai-geki	
	黒い樹海	1960.12.14	Haruo Atsuda			
	善人残酷物語	1960.12.14	Masahisa Sunohara			
	東京の空の下で	1960.12.14	Tarō Yuge			
	真昼の罠	1960.12.18	Mitsuo Yagi			
Tokkaido kagonuke chindochu	東海道駕籠抜け珍道中	1960.12.20	Jukichi Takemae	Norihei Miki, Kingoro Yanagiya, Atsushi Watanabe	Comedy	
	コルトが背中を狙ってる	1960.12.21	Takumi Furukawa			
Kagamiyama Kyoenroku	鏡山競艶録	1960.12.21	Masateru Nishiyama		Jidai-geki	
	美しき抵抗	1960.12.21	Kenjirō Morinaga			
Yokaden	妖花伝	1960.12.21	Bin Kato		Jidai-geki	
The Masterless 47	サラリーマン忠臣蔵	1960.12.25	Toshio Sugie	Hisaya Morishige, Daisuke Katō, Keiju Kobayashi	Comedy	
Sazae and Aunt Apron	サザエさんとエプロンおばさん	1960.12.25	Nobuo Aoyagi	Chiemi Eri, Hiroshi Koizumi, Eiko Mimasu		
The Adventures of Princess Anmitsu	あんみつ姫の無者修行	1960.12.27	Tatsuo Ōsone		Jidai-geki	
	俺の故郷は大西部	1960.12.27	Katsumi Nishikawa			
	旗本愚連隊	1960.12.27	Seiichi Fukuda		Jidai-geki	
	三兄弟の決闘	1960.12.27	Shigeo Tanaka			
Days of Young Jirocho: Boss of Tokai	若き日の次郎長 東海の顔役	1960.12.27	Masahiro Makino		Jidai-geki	
Case of Young Lord 8	若さま侍捕物帖	1960.12.27	Yasushi Sasaki		Jidai-geki	
Lord Mito: A Nation in Trouble	水戸黄門 天下の大騒動	1960.12.27	Kinnosuke Fukada		Jidai-geki	
Daibosatsu Pass 2: The Dragon God	大菩薩峠 竜神の巻	1960.12.27	Kenji Misumi		Jidai-geki	
	闘牛に賭ける男	1960.12.27	Toshio Masuda			
	凸凹珍道中	1960.12.27	Toshirō Ōmi			
Ninjutsu at Sanada Castle	忍術真田城	1960.12.27	Noboru Ono		Jidai-geki / Ninja	
	暴力五人娘	1960.12.27	Morihei Magatani			

== See also ==
- 1960 in Japan
