= Yōjasō no Maō =

- Japanese movie poster
- Directed by: Morihei Magatani
- Written by: Nagayoshi Akasaka; Michiyoshi Doi
- Produced by: Mitsugi Okura
- Starring: Jūzaburō Akechi; Jack Altenbay; Ureo Egawa; Chisako Hara; Shinsuke Mikimoto
- Cinematography: Morita Shigeru
- Edited by: Toshio Gotō
- Music by: Sadao Nagase
- Production company: Shintoho
- Release date: October 22, 1957 (Japan)
- Running time: 74 minutes
- Country: Japan
- Language: Japanese

Yōjasō no Maō (Japanese: 妖蛇荘の魔王), also known as Demon King of Yoja Manor, is a 1957 black-and-white Japanese horror film directed by Morihei Magatani.

== Cast ==
- Jūzaburō Akechi as Goro Hayatori
- Jack Altenbay as Professor Stanley
- Ureo Egawa as Professor Sakurada
- Chisako Hara as Tomoko Nakano
- Ed Keane as Head of Monotol Repubric
- Sōzaburō Kikuchi as Monster
- Kyōji Kokonoe as Detective Yoshioka
- Shinsuke Mikimoto as Tsubota
- Fujio Murakami as Detective Narai
- Misao Nakahara as Kyoko Tsukita
- Akemi Nishi as Acrobat woman
- Shojiro Ogasawara as Hunchback
- Masaru Okada as Hiroshi Yamada
- Reiko Seto as Mitsuko Nogata
- Yoshihisa Suzuki as Acrobat man
- Ken Uehara as Inspector Uemura
- Katsuko Wakasugi as Aguri
- Miyako Yamaguchi as Yasuko Hayatori
- Shinobu Yuki as Kyoko's assistant
- Reiko Ohara as Miko
