= 1960 in film =

The year 1960 in film involved some significant events.

== Top-grossing films (U.S.) ==
The top ten 1960 released films by box office gross in North America are as follows:

Highest-grossing films of 1960
Rank	Title	Distributor	Domestic rentals
1	Spartacus	Universal	$14,000,000
2	Psycho	Paramount (Note: After Psycho was released, Paramount transferred the film rights to Hitchcock, who later sold the distribution rights to Universal Pictures in 1962.)	$9,100,000
3	Exodus	United Artists	$8,500,000
4	Swiss Family Robinson	Buena Vista	$8,100,000
5	The Alamo	United Artists	$7,900,000
6	The World of Suzie Wong	Paramount	$7,500,000
7	BUtterfield 8	MGM	$6,800,000
8	The Apartment	United Artists	$6,700,000
9	Ocean's 11	Warner Bros.	$5,500,000
10	From the Terrace	20th Century Fox	$5,200,000

== Top-grossing films by country ==
The highest-grossing 1960 films in countries outside of North America.

Country	Title	Director	Revenue	Admissions	Source(s)
France	Ben-Hur	William Wyler	—N/a	13,826,124	
West Germany	Ben-Hur	William Wyler	—N/a	13,525,000	
India	Mughal-e-Azam	K. Asif	$23,110,000	100,000,000	(Note: Mughal-e-Azam in India: ₹11 crore, 4.76 Indian rupees per US dollar)
Italy	Ben-Hur	William Wyler	—N/a	15,400,000	
Soviet Union	Far from the Motherland	Aleksei Shvachko	$2,625,000	42,000,000	(Note: 10.5 million Rbls (42 million Soviet tickets sold, average ticket price of 25 kopecks), 4 SUR per USD (Note: 4 Rbls per US dollar from 1950 to 1960))
Spain	Ben-Hur	William Wyler	—N/a	4,653,194	
United Kingdom	Ben-Hur	William Wyler	—N/a	13,200,000	

== Events ==
- March 5 – For the first time since coming home from military service in Germany, Elvis Presley returns to Hollywood to film G.I. Blues
- June 16 – Premiere of Alfred Hitchcock's landmark film, Psycho in the United States. Controversial since release, it sets new standards in violence and sexuality on screen, and is a critical influence on the emerging slasher genre.
- August 5 - Mughal-e-Azam, produced and directed by K. Asif and starring Prithviraj Kapoor, Dilip Kumar, Madhubala, and Durga Khote, premieres at the Maratha Mandir in Mumbai. Production has been plagued by delays and financial uncertainty. Before its principal photography began in the early 1950s, the project had lost a financier and undergone a complete change of cast. Mughal-e-Azam cost more to produce than any previous Indian motion picture but it breaks box office records in India and becomes the highest-grossing Indian film, a distinction it holds for 15 years. The film is widely considered to be a milestone for its genre, earning praise from critics for its grandeur and attention to detail, and the performances of its cast (especially that of Madhubala, who earns a nomination for the Filmfare Award for Best Actress).
- August 10 – Filming of West Side Story begins.
- October 6 & December 16 – Dalton Trumbo, one of the Hollywood Ten, receives full screenwriting credit for his work on the films Spartacus and Exodus, released in the United States on these dates.
- October 27 – Film Saturday Night and Sunday Morning released, first of the British social-realist wave.
- November 4 – Filming wraps on The Misfits, starring Marilyn Monroe and Clark Gable, the last film for both (though Monroe will be working on another at the time of her death).

== Awards ==
Category/Organization	18th Golden Globe Awards March 16, 1961		33rd Academy Awards April 17, 1961
Category/Organization	Drama	Comedy or Musical	33rd Academy Awards April 17, 1961
Best Film	Spartacus	The Apartment (Comedy); Song Without End (Musical)	The Apartment
Best Director	Jack Cardiff; Sons and Lovers		Billy Wilder; The Apartment
Best Actor	Burt Lancaster; Elmer Gantry	Jack Lemmon; The Apartment	Burt Lancaster; Elmer Gantry
Best Actress	Greer Garson; Sunrise at Campobello	Shirley MacLaine; The Apartment	Elizabeth Taylor; BUtterfield 8
Best Supporting Actor	Sal Mineo; Exodus		Peter Ustinov; Spartacus
Best Supporting Actress	Janet Leigh; Psycho		Shirley Jones; Elmer Gantry
Best Foreign Language Film	La Vérité; The Trials of Oscar Wilde; The Virgin Spring		The Virgin Spring

== 1960 film releases ==
United States unless stated

=== January–March ===
- January 1960
  - 5 January
    - When a Woman Ascends the Stairs (Japan)
  - 12 January
    - Mrs. Warren's Profession (West Germany)
  - 20 January
    - The Immoral Mr. Teas
  - 21 January
    - Toby Tyler
  - 26 January
    - Two Way Stretch (U.K.)
  - 27 January
    - Cash McCall
    - Take Aim at the Police Van (Japan)
  - 28 January
    - The Lady with the Dog (U.S.S.R.)
- February 1960
  - 1 February
    - Hell Bent for Leather
  - 3 February
    - The Rise and Fall of Legs Diamond
  - 4 February
    - Visit to a Small Planet
  - 5 February
    - La Dolce Vita (Italy)
  - 11 February
    - Once More, with Feeling!
    - Sink the Bismarck! (U.K.)
  - 19 February
    - Devi (India)
    - The Last Voyage
  - 24 February
    - The Bramble Bush
    - Kidnapped
  - 25 February
    - The Battle of the Sexes (U.K.)
  - 27 February
    - Cleopatra's Daughter
    - The Hypnotic Eye
- March 1960
  - 1 March
    - Comanche Station
    - Heller in Pink Tights
  - 2 March
    - Eyes Without a Face (France)
  - 3 March
    - Home from the Hill
  - 4 March
    - Never Take Sweets from a Stranger (U.K.)
  - 5 March
    - The 3rd Voice
  - 9 March
    - Can-Can
  - 10 March
    - Purple Noon (France)
  - 12 March
    - Seven Thieves
  - 15 March
    - 5 Branded Women
    - The Angry Silence (U.K.)
  - 17 March
    - Breathless (France)
  - 18 March
    - The Hole (France)
  - 23 March
    - The Big Risk (France)
  - 31 March
    - Please Don't Eat the Daisies

=== April–June ===
- April 1960
  - 2 April
    - Twelve Hours to Kill
  - 5 April
    - The League of Gentlemen (U.K.)
  - 6 April
    - Tall Story
    - The Unforgiven
  - 10 April
    - The Secret of the Telegian (Japan)
    - Hell Is a City
  - 13 April
    - Obaltan (South Korea)
  - 14 April
    - The Fugitive Kind
  - 15 April
    - Who Was That Lady?
  - 21 April
    - The Ninth Circle (Yugoslavia)
  - 24 April
    - Private Property
  - 27 April
    - The Demon of Mount Oe (Japan)
- May 1960
  - 16 May
    - Peeping Tom (U.K.)
  - 17 May
    - The Challenge (U.K.)
  - 19 May
    - Crack in the Mirror
    - Pollyanna
  - 25 May
    - Faust (West Germany)
  - 26 May
    - Wild River
- June 1960
  - 3 June
    - Cruel Story of Youth (Japan)
  - 7 June
    - Never Let Go (U.K.)
  - 9 June
    - Macario (Mexico)
  - 15 June
    - The Apartment
  - 16 June
    - Psycho
  - 17 June
    - The Story of Ruth
    - A Terrible Beauty
  - 22 June
    - The Gallant Hours
    - House of Usher
  - 23 June
    - Bells Are Ringing
    - The Party Is Over (Argentina)
    - Portrait in Black
  - 24 June
    - Dinosaurus!
  - 27 June
    - Letter Never Sent (Russia)
  - 28 June
    - Murder, Inc.
  - 29 June
    - L'Avventura (Italy)
    - Strangers When We Meet

=== July–September ===
- July 1960
  - 7 July
    - The Brides of Dracula
    - Elmer Gantry
    - Inherit the Wind
  - 10 July
    - 13 Ghosts
    - The Rat Race
  - 13 July
    - The Lost World
  - 15 July
    - From the Terrace
    - Knights of the Teutonic Order (Poland)
  - 20 July
    - The Bellboy
  - 25 July
    - The Entertainer (U.K.)
  - 30 July
    - Jigoku (Japan)
- August 1960
  - 5 August
    - Last Woman on Earth
    - Mughal-e-Azam (India)
    - Parakh (India)
  - 7 August
    - It Started in Naples
  - 9 August
    - Make Mine Mink (U.K.)
  - 10 August
    - Jungle Cat
    - Ocean's 11
  - 11 August
    - Black Sunday (Italy)
    - Song Without End
  - 14 August
    - Alakazam the Great (Japan)
  - 17 August
    - The Enchanting Shadow (Hong Kong)
    - The Time Machine
  - 20 August
    - College Confidential
- September 1960
  - 6 September
    - Rocco and His Brothers (Italy/France)
  - 8 September
    - Let's Make Love
  - 9 September
    - September Storm
    - The City of the Dead (U.K.)
  - 14 September
    - The Little Shop of Horrors
  - 15 September
    - Under Ten Flags
  - 16 September
    - High Time
  - 19 September
    - The Bad Sleep Well (Japan)
  - 28 September
    - Sunrise at Campobello
  - 29 September
    - Kapo (Italy)
    - Surprise Package
  - 30 September
    - Hell to Eternity

=== October–December ===
- October 1960
  - 1 October
    - Autumn Has Already Started
    - Never on Sunday (Greece/United States)
  - 6 October
    - Spartacus
  - 8 October
    - A False Student (Japan)
    - Everything Goes Wrong (Japan)
  - 9 October
    - Night and Fog in Japan (Japan)
  - 12 October
    - The Magnificent Seven
  - 13 October
    - Midnight Lace
  - 17 October
    - The Devil's Eye (Sweden)
  - 18 October
    - The Millionairess (U.K.)
  - 24 October
    - The Alamo
  - 27 October
    - Everybody Go Home (Italy)
    - Saturday Night and Sunday Morning (U.K.)
  - 28 October
    - Zazie in the Metro (France)
  - 31 October
    - Man in the Moon (U.K.)
- November 1960
  - 1 November
    - Her Brother (Japan)
    - Ten Who Dared
  - 3 November
    - El Cochecito (Spain)
    - Five Cartridges (East Germany)
    - The Housemaid (South Korea)
  - 4 November
    - BUtterfield 8
    - G.I. Blues
  - 10 November
    - The World of Suzie Wong (U.K./U.S.)
  - 13 November
    - Late Autumn (Japan)
    - North to Alaska
  - 14 November
    - The Facts of Life
  - 16 November
    - Fortunat (France/Italy)
  - 22 November
    - Cinderfella
  - 23 November
    - Go to Hell, Hoodlums!
    - The Naked Island (Japan)
  - 25 November
    - Minotaur, the Wild Beast of Crete (Italy)
- December 1960
  - 1 December
    - Cimarron
  - 7 December
    - Village of the Damned (U.K.)
  - 9 December
    - The Sundowners
    - Barsaat Ki Raat (India)
  - 11 December
    - The Human Vapor
  - 12 December
    - The River of Love (Egypt)
    - The Yellow Gloves (Greece)
  - 14 December
    - Esther and the King (U.S./Italy)
  - 16 December
    - Exodus
    - The 3 Worlds of Gulliver
  - 17 December
    - Innocent Sorcerers (Poland)
    - West Side Story ( United States)
  - 20 December
    - Flaming Star
    - Pepe
    - Tunes of Glory (U.K.)
    - The Wackiest Ship in the Army
  - 21 December
    - Swiss Family Robinson
  - 23 December
    - The Grass Is Greener
  - 28 December
    - Where the Boys Are
  - 30 December
    - The Last Witness (West Germany)

== Notable films released in 1960 ==
United States unless stated

=== # ===
- The 3rd Voice, directed by Hubert Cornfield, starring Edmond O'Brien, Laraine Day, Julie London
- 5 Branded Women, directed by Martin Ritt, starring Vera Miles, Barbara Bel Geddes, Jeanne Moreau
- 13 Ghosts, directed by William Castle

=== A ===
- Adua and Friends (Adua e le compagne), starring Simone Signoret – (Italy)
- Alakazam the Great (Saiyu-ki), an anime film – (Japan)
- The Alamo, directed by and starring John Wayne, co-starring Richard Widmark, Laurence Harvey, Chill Wills, Frankie Avalon, Richard Boone
- Ali Baba Bujang Lapok – (Malaysia/Singapore)
- The Angry Silence, starring Richard Attenborough – (U.K.)
- Anuradha – (India)
- The Apartment, directed by Billy Wilder, starring Jack Lemmon, Shirley MacLaine, Fred MacMurray, Ray Walston, Jack Kruschen, Edie Adams
- Autumn Has Already Started (Aki tachinu), directed by Mikio Naruse – (Japan)
- L'Avventura (The Adventure), directed by Michelangelo Antonioni – (Italy)

=== B ===
- Bad Luck (Zezowate szczęście) – (Poland)
- Barsaat Ki Raat, starring Madhubala and Bharat Bhushan – (India)
- The Bad Sleep Well (Warui yatsu hodo yoku nemuru), directed by Akira Kurosawa, starring Toshiro Mifune – (Japan)
- Because They're Young, starring Dick Clark
- Beat Girl, starring David Farrar, Gillian Hills, Adam Faith, Christopher Lee – (U.K.)
- The Bellboy, starring Jerry Lewis
- Bells Are Ringing, starring Judy Holliday, Dean Martin, and Jean Stapleton
- Beyond the Time Barrier
- The Big Risk (Classe tous risques), starring Lino Ventura, Sandra Milo, Jean-Paul Belmondo – (France)
- Black Sunday (La maschera del demonio) – (Italy)
- Les Bonnes Femmes (The Girls), directed by Claude Chabrol – (France)
- The Bramble Bush, starring Richard Burton and Angie Dickinson
- Breathless (À bout de souffle), directed by Jean-Luc Godard, starring Jean-Paul Belmondo and Jean Seberg – (France)
- The Brides of Dracula, starring Peter Cushing – (U.K.)
- The Broken Pots (Kırık Çanaklar) – (Turkey)
- BUtterfield 8, directed by Daniel Mann, starring Elizabeth Taylor and Laurence Harvey

=== C ===
- Can-Can, starring Frank Sinatra, Shirley MacLaine, Louis Jourdan, Juliet Prowse
- Carry On Constable, starring Sid James and Eric Barker – (U.K.)
- Cash McCall, starring James Garner and Natalie Wood
- The Challenge, a.k.a. It Takes A Thief, starring Jayne Mansfield – (U.K.)
- Cidade Ameaçada (a.k.a. Jerry the Gangster) – (Brazil)
- Cimarron, directed by Anthony Mann, starring Glenn Ford, Maria Schell, Anne Baxter
- Cinderfella, starring Jerry Lewis and Anna Maria Alberghetti
- Circus of Horrors, starring Anton Diffring and Donald Pleasence – (U.K.)
- Cleopatra's Daughter, starring Debra Paget
- The Cloud-Capped Star (Meghe Daka Tara), directed by Ritwik Ghatak – (India)
- El Cochecito (The Little Coach), directed by Marco Ferreri – (Spain)
- College Confidential, starring Mamie Van Doren
- Comanche Station, directed by Budd Boetticher, starring Randolph Scott
- Come Back, Africa, documentary film – (South Africa)
- Crack in the Mirror, directed by Richard Fleischer, starring Orson Welles, Bradford Dillman, Juliette Gréco
- The Criminal, directed by Joseph Losey, starring Stanley Baker – (U.K.)
- Cruel Story of Youth (Seishun Zankoku Monogatari), directed by Nagisa Oshima – (Japan)

=== D ===
- The Dark at the Top of the Stairs, starring Dorothy McGuire, Shirley Knight, Robert Preston, Angela Lansbury
- Dentist in the Chair, starring Bob Monkhouse and Kenneth Connor – (U.K.)
- Desire in the Dust, starring Joan Bennett, Martha Hyer, Raymond Burr
- Devi (a.k.a. The Goddess), directed by Satyajit Ray – (India)
- The Devil's Eye (Djävulens öga), directed by Ingmar Bergman, starring Bibi Andersson – (Sweden)
- La Dolce Vita (The Sweet Life), directed by Federico Fellini, starring Marcello Mastroianni and Anita Ekberg – (Italy)

=== E ===
- Elmer Gantry, directed by Richard Brooks, starring Burt Lancaster, Jean Simmons, Arthur Kennedy, Shirley Jones
- The Enchanting Shadow (Ching nu yu hun) – (Hong Kong)
- The Entertainer, directed by Tony Richardson, starring Laurence Olivier – (U.K.)
- Esther and the King, starring Joan Collins and Richard Egan – (U.S./Italy)
- Everybody Go Home (Tutti a casa), directed by Luigi Comencini – (Italy)
- Exodus, directed by Otto Preminger, starring Paul Newman, Eva Marie Saint, Sal Mineo, Peter Lawford, Lee J. Cobb, John Derek
- Eyes Without a Face (Les yeux sans visage), starring Pierre Brasseur and Alida Valli – (France)

=== F ===
- The Facts of Life, starring Bob Hope and Lucille Ball
- A False Student (Nise daigakusei) – (Japan)
- Faust – (West Germany)
- Five Cartridges (Fünf Patronenhülsen) – (East Germany)
- Flaming Star, starring Elvis Presley and Barbara Eden
- Fortunat (Fortunate), starring Bourvil and Michèle Morgan – (France/Italy)
- From the Terrace, starring Paul Newman, Joanne Woodward, Ina Balin, George Grizzard, Myrna Loy
- The Fugitive Kind, directed by Sidney Lumet, starring Marlon Brando, Anna Magnani, Joanne Woodward

=== G ===
- G.I. Blues, starring Elvis Presley and Juliet Prowse
- The Gallant Hours, a biopic of Admiral "Bull" Halsey starring James Cagney
- Girl of the Night, starring Anne Francis and John Kerr
- Go to Hell, Hoodlums! (Kutabare gurentai) – (Japan)
- Goliath and the Dragon
- Goliath II, a Disney animated short
- The Grass Is Greener, starring Cary Grant, Deborah Kerr, Robert Mitchum, Jean Simmons
- Guns of the Timberland, starring Alan Ladd

=== H ===
- Hell Bent for Leather, starring Audie Murphy and Felicia Farr
- Hell Is a City, starring Stanley Baker – (U.K.)
- Heller in Pink Tights, starring Sophia Loren and Anthony Quinn
- Hell to Eternity, starring Jeffrey Hunter and David Janssen
- Her Brother (Otôto), directed by Kon Ichikawa – (Japan)
- High Time, starring Bing Crosby
- Hobbi al-Wahid (My Only Love), starring Omar Sharif – (Egypt)
- The Hole (Le Trou) (a.k.a. The Night Watch), directed by Jacques Becker – (France)
- Home from the Hill, directed by Vincente Minnelli, starring Robert Mitchum, Eleanor Parker, George Peppard
- House of Usher, directed by Roger Corman, starring Vincent Price
- The Housemaid (Hanyeo) – (South Korea)
- The Human Vapor (Gasu Ningen dai Ichigo), directed by Ishirō Honda – (Japan)
- The Hypnotic Eye, starring Jacques Bergerac

=== I ===
- Il Mattatore, directed by Dino Risi – (Italy)
- I Aim at the Stars, directed by J. Lee Thompson, starring Curd Jürgens, Herbert Lom, Gia Scala
- Ice Palace, starring Richard Burton, Robert Ryan and Carolyn Jones
- The Iceman Cometh, directed by Sidney Lumet, starring Jason Robards Jr., Myron McCormick, and Robert Redford – (made for TV)
- Inherit the Wind, directed by Stanley Kramer, starring Spencer Tracy, Fredric March, Gene Kelly, Harry Morgan, Dick York
- Inni Attahim, directed by Hassan el-Imam, starring Zubaida Tharwat, Salah Zulfikar, Emad Hamdy – (Egypt)
- Innocent Sorcerers (Niewinni czarodzieje), directed by Andrzej Wajda – (Poland)
- It Started in Naples, starring Clark Gable and Sophia Loren

=== J ===
- Jaali Note (Counterfeit Money), starring Madhubala and Dev Anand – (India)
- Jigoku (Hell) – (Japan)
- Jis Desh Men Ganga Behti Hai (The Land Where the Ganges Flows), starring Raj Kapoor – (India)

=== K ===
- Kanoon (The Law), starring Ashok Kumar – (India)
- Knights of the Teutonic Order (Krzyżacy), directed by Aleksander Ford – (Poland)

=== L ===
- The Lady with the Dog (Dama s sobachkoy) – (U.S.S.R.)
- The Last Voyage, starring Robert Stack and Dorothy Malone
- The Last Witness (Der Letzte Zeuge) – (West Germany)
- Last Woman on Earth, directed by Roger Corman
- Late Autumn (Akibiyori), directed by Yasujirō Ozu – (Japan)
- The League of Gentlemen, directed by Basil Dearden, starring Jack Hawkins – (U.K.)
- Let No Man Write My Epitaph, starring Shelley Winters, Burl Ives, James Darren, Ella Fitzgerald
- Let's Make Love, starring Marilyn Monroe and Yves Montand
- The Little Shop of Horrors, directed by Roger Corman
- Linda, starring Carol White – (U.K.)
- The Lost World, starring Michael Rennie and Jill St. John
- Love and Adoration, directed by Hassan el-Imam, starring Salah Zulfikar and Taheyya Kariokka – (Egypt)
- Love in Simla, starring Joy Mukherjee and Sadhana – (India)

=== M ===
- Macario, directed by Roberto Gavaldón – (Mexico)
- Macumba Love – (United States/Brazil)
- The Magnificent Seven, directed by John Sturges, starring Yul Brynner, Steve McQueen, Charles Bronson, Eli Wallach, Robert Vaughn, James Coburn, Brad Dexter, Horst Buchholz
- Make Mine Mink, starring Terry-Thomas – (U.K.)
- Makkers Staakt uw Wild Geraas (a.k.a. That Joyous Eve), directed by Fons Rademakers – (Netherlands)
- Man in the Moon, starring Kenneth More – (U.K.)
- Manzil (Destination), starring Dev Anand – (India)
- Midnight Lace, starring Doris Day, Rex Harrison, John Gavin, Myrna Loy
- The Millionairess, directed by Anthony Asquith, starring Sophia Loren and Peter Sellers – (U.K.)
- Money and Women, directed by Hassan el-Imam, starring Salah Zulfikar and Soad Hosny – (Egypt)
- The Mountain Road, starring James Stewart
- Mrs. Warren's Profession (Frau Warrens Gewerbe), starring Lilli Palmer (West Germany)
- Mughal-e-Azam (The Greatest of the Mughals), starring Madhubala and Dilip Kumar – (India)
- Murder, Inc., starring Peter Falk, Stuart Whitman, May Britt, Henry Morgan

=== N ===
- The Naked Island (Hadaka no shima) – (Japan)
- Never Let Go, directed by John Guillermin, starring Richard Todd, Peter Sellers, Elizabeth Sellars and Adam Faith – (U.K.)
- Never on Sunday, directed by Jules Dassin, starring Melina Mercouri – (Greece/United States)
- Never Take Sweets from a Stranger, starring Patrick Allen and Gwen Watford – (U.K.)
- Night and Fog in Japan (Nihon no yoru to kiri), directed by Nagisa Oshima – (Japan)
- The Ninth Circle (Deveti krug) – (Yugoslavia)
- North to Alaska, starring John Wayne, Stewart Granger, Ernie Kovacs, Capucine, Fabian Forte

=== O ===
- Obaltan (a.k.a. The Stray Bullet) – (South Korea)
- Ocean's 11, starring Frank Sinatra, Dean Martin, Sammy Davis Jr., Peter Lawford, Joey Bishop, Angie Dickinson
- Once More, with Feeling!, directed by Stanley Donen, starring Yul Brynner
- Our Last Spring (a.k.a. Eroica), directed by Michael Cacoyannis – (Greece)

=== P ===
- Parakh, directed by Bimal Roy – (India)
- The Party Is Over (Fin de fiesta) – (Argentina)
- Le Passage du Rhin, starring Charles Aznavour – (France/Italy/West Germany)
- Peeping Tom, directed by Michael Powell, starring Karl Boehm, Anna Massey, Moira Shearer – (U.K.)
- Pepe, starring Cantinflas
- Please Don't Eat the Daisies, starring Doris Day and David Niven
- Pollyanna, starring Hayley Mills
- Portrait in Black, starring Lana Turner, Anthony Quinn, Sandra Dee
- The Private Lives of Adam and Eve, starring Mickey Rooney and Mamie Van Doren
- Psycho, directed by Alfred Hitchcock, starring Anthony Perkins, Vera Miles, Janet Leigh, Martin Balsam, John Gavin
- The Pure Hell of St Trinian's, starring Cecil Parker and Joyce Grenfell – (U.K.)
- Purple Noon (Plein Soleil), a.k.a. Blazing Sun, directed by René Clément, starring Alain Delon – (France)

=== Q ===
- The Queen of Spades (Pikovaya dama) – (U.S.S.R.)

=== R ===
- The Rat Race, starring Debbie Reynolds, Tony Curtis, Don Rickles
- The Rise and Fall of Legs Diamond, directed by Budd Boetticher, starring Ray Danton and Karen Steele
- The River of Love (Nahr el hub), starring Omar Sharif – (Egypt)
- Rocco and His Brothers (Rocco e i suoi fratelli), directed by Luchino Visconti, starring Alain Delon – (Italy/France)
- Romeo, Juliet and Darkness (Romeo, Julie a tma) – (Czechoslovakia)
- The Running Jumping & Standing Still Film, directed by Richard Lester and Peter Sellers – (U.K.)

=== S ===
- Saturday Night and Sunday Morning, directed by Karel Reisz, starring Albert Finney, Shirley Anne Field, Rachel Roberts – (U.K.)
- The Savage Innocents, directed by Nicholas Ray, starring Anthony Quinn
- Scent of Mystery, starring Denholm Elliott and Elizabeth Taylor
- School for Scoundrels, directed by Robert Hamer, starring Ian Carmichael and Terry-Thomas – (U.K.)
- September Storm, starring Joanne Dru
- Sergeant Rutledge, starring Jeffrey Hunter and Woody Strode
- Seven Days... Seven Nights (Moderato cantabile), starring Jeanne Moreau – (France)
- Seven Thieves, starring Edward G. Robinson, Rod Steiger, Eli Wallach, Joan Collins
- Shoot the Pianist (Tirez sur le pianiste), directed by François Truffaut, starring Charles Aznavour – (France)
- Sink the Bismarck!, starring Kenneth More – (U.K.)
- The Skeleton of Mrs. Morales (El Esqueleto de la señora Morales), starring Arturo de Córdova – (Mexico)
- Song Without End, starring Dirk Bogarde, Capucine, Patricia Morison
- Sons and Lovers, directed by Jack Cardiff, starring Dean Stockwell and Trevor Howard – (U.K.)
- Spartacus, directed by Stanley Kubrick, starring Kirk Douglas, Laurence Olivier, Jean Simmons, Charles Laughton, John Gavin, Peter Ustinov, Tony Curtis
- The Spider's Web, directed by Godfrey Grayson. Based on an Agatha Christie play (U.K.)
- The Story of Ruth, a Biblical drama starring Stuart Whitman and Peggy Wood
- Strangers When We Meet, starring Kim Novak, Kirk Douglas, Ernie Kovacs
- Struggle for Eagle Peak (Venner) – (Norway)
- The Subterraneans, starring George Peppard
- The Sundowners, directed by Fred Zinnemann, starring Deborah Kerr and Robert Mitchum – (US/UK/Australia)
- Summer of the Seventeenth Doll, a.k.a. Season of Passion, starring Anne Baxter, Angela Lansbury, Ernest Borgnine, John Mills
- Sunrise at Campobello, starring Ralph Bellamy (as Franklin D. Roosevelt) and Greer Garson
- Surprise Package, directed by Stanley Donen, starring Yul Brynner, Mitzi Gaynor, Noël Coward
- Swiss Family Robinson, starring John Mills and Dorothy McGuire

=== T ===
- Tall Story, starring Jane Fonda, Anthony Perkins, Ray Walston
- Tarzan the Magnificent, starring Gordon Scott, Jock Mahoney, John Carradine
- A Terrible Beauty, directed by Tay Garnett, starring Robert Mitchum and Anne Heywood
- Testament of Orpheus (Le Testament d'Orphée), directed by Jean Cocteau – (France)
- There Was a Crooked Man, starring Norman Wisdom – (U.K.)
- The Thousand Eyes of Dr. Mabuse (Die tausend Augen des Dr. Mabuse), directed by Fritz Lang – (West Germany)
- The Three Worlds of Gulliver, starring Kerwin Mathews
- The Time Machine, starring Rod Taylor and Yvette Mimieux
- Too Hot to Handle, starring Jayne Mansfield – (U.K.)
- The Trials of Oscar Wilde, starring Peter Finch – (U.K.)
- The Truth (La Vérité), directed by Henri-Georges Clouzot, starring Brigitte Bardot – (France)
- Tunes of Glory, directed by Ronald Neame, starring Alec Guinness – (U.K.)
- Twelve Hours to Kill, starring Nico Minardos and Barbara Eden
- Two-Way Stretch, starring Peter Sellers – (U.K.)
- Two Women, directed by Vittorio De Sica, starring Sophia Loren – (Italy)

=== U ===
- Under Ten Flags, starring Van Heflin and Charles Laughton
- The Unforgiven, starring Burt Lancaster and Audrey Hepburn
- Universe – (Canada)

=== V ===
- Vice Raid, starring Mamie Van Doren
- Village of the Damned, starring George Sanders and Barbara Shelley – (U.K.)
- The Virgin Spring (Jungfrukällan), directed by Ingmar Bergman, starring Max von Sydow – (Sweden)
- Visit to a Small Planet, starring Jerry Lewis

=== W ===
- The Wackiest Ship in the Army, starring Jack Lemmon and Ricky Nelson
- Watch Your Stern, starring Eric Barker and Leslie Phillips – (U.K.)
- When a Woman Ascends the Stairs (Onna ga kaidan wo agaru toki), directed by Mikio Naruse – (Japan)
- Where the Boys Are, starring George Hamilton, Paula Prentiss, Connie Francis
- The White Horse Inn (Im weißen Rößl) – (West Germany/Austria)
- Who Was That Lady?, starring Dean Martin, Tony Curtis, Janet Leigh
- Wild River, directed by Elia Kazan, starring Montgomery Clift
- The World of Suzie Wong, starring Nancy Kwan and William Holden – (U.K./U.S.)

=== Y ===
- The Yellow Gloves (Ta kitrina gantia) – (Greece)
- The Young One (La Joven), directed by Luis Buñuel – (Mexico/United States)

=== Z ===
- Zazie dans le Métro, directed by Louis Malle – (France)

== Short film series ==
- Looney Tunes (1930–1969)
- Terrytoons (1930–1964)
- Merrie Melodies (1931–1969)
- Bugs Bunny (1940–1964)
- Yosemite Sam (1945–1963)
- Speedy Gonzales (1953–1968)

== Births ==
- January 1 - Shinya Tsukamoto, Japanese filmmaker and actor
- January 4 – April Winchell, American actress, voice actress, writer, talk radio host and commentator
- January 9
  - Peter Hastings, American writer, director and producer
  - Terje Pennie, Estonian actress
- January 10 – Gurinder Chadha, British director
- January 11 - Annie Corley, American actress
- January 12
  - Wanda Cannon, Canadian actress
  - Oliver Platt, Canadian actor
- January 13 – Kevin Anderson, American actor
- January 15 – Kelly Asbury, American director, writer and voice actor (died 2020)
- January 18 – Mark Rylance, English actor
- January 25
  - Kerry Noonan, American actress
  - Audrey Wells, American screenwriter, director and producer (died 2018)
- February 4 – Jenette Goldstein, American actress
- February 7
  - Robert Smigel, American actor, comedian, writer, director, producer and puppeteer
  - James Spader, American actor
- February 8 - Suzanna Hamilton, English actress
- February 9 – David Bateson, British actor and comedian
- February 13 – Matt Salinger, American actor and producer
- February 14 – Meg Tilly, Canadian-American actress
- February 18
  - Tony Anselmo, American animator and cartoon voice actor
  - Greta Scacchi, Italian-Australian actress
- February 20 – Wendee Lee, American voice actress
- February 21 – Joel McKinnon Miller, American actor
- February 22 - Brian Anthony Wilson, American actor
- February 25 – Douglas Hodge, English actor, director and musician
- February 26 - Michael Cumpsty, English actor
- February 28 – Dorothy Stratten, Canadian model and actress (died 1980)
- March 11 - Simon Curtis, English director and producer
- March 12
  - Jason Beghe, American actor
  - Courtney B. Vance, American actor
- March 13 – Joe Ranft, American screenwriter, animator and voice actor (died 2005)
- March 14 - Anna Katarina, Swiss actress
- March 17
  - Arye Gross, American actor
  - Vicki Lewis, American singer and actress
  - Cameron Thor, American actor, filmmaker and acting coach
- March 18 - Steve Kloves, American screenwriter, director and producer
- March 22
  - Greg Cruttwell, English filmmaker and former actor
  - Nicole Holofcener, American film director and screenwriter
- March 25 – Brenda Strong, American actress and director
- March 26 – Jennifer Grey, American actress
- March 29
  - Annabella Sciorra, American actress and producer
  - Hiromi Tsuru, Japanese actress, voice actress and narrator (died 2017)
- March 31 – Michelle Nicastro, American actress and singer (died 2010)
- April 1 – Jennifer Runyon, American actress (died 2026)
- April 4
  - Hugo Weaving, English actor
  - Lorraine Toussaint, Trinidadian-American actress
- April 5 - Timothy V. Murphy, Irish actor
- April 7
  - Pete Lee-Wilson, British actor
  - Elaine Miles, American actress
- April 10 - Olivia Brown, American actress
- April 14 – Brad Garrett, American actor, voice actor, stand-up comedian and professional poker-player
- April 23
  - Craig Sheffer, American actor
  - Valerie Bertinelli, American actress
- April 27 - John Philbin, American actor
- April 29 - Steve Blum, American voice actor
- April 30 - Beata Poźniak, Polish-American actress and director
- May 1 - Matilda Thorpe, British actress
- May 2
  - Robert Bockstael, Canadian actor, director and writer
  - Stephen Daldry, English director and producer
- May 3 - Amy Steel, American actress
- May 4 - Paul Bhattacharjee, British actor (died 2013)
- May 6 - Frank Wood, American actor
- May 9 - Lisa Henson, American actress and producer actress
- May 10 - Richard Graham, English actor
- May 15 - Rob Bowman, American director
- May 16 - Rosario Fiorello, Italian actor, comedian and singer
- May 20
  - John Billingsley, American actor
  - Tony Goldwyn, American actor, singer, producer and director
- May 21 – Mohanlal, Indian actor
- May 22 - Hideaki Anno, Japanese animator, filmmaker, and actor
- May 24
  - Kristin Scott Thomas, English actress
  - Doug Jones, American actor
- May 26 - Doug Hutchison, American character actor
- May 31
  - Chris Elliott, American actor and comedian
  - Don Harvey, American actor and voice actor
- June 2 - Pip Torrens, English actor
- June 5 - James Isaac, American director and visual effects supervisor (died 2012)
- June 8 - Gary Trousdale, American animator, director, screenwriter and storyboard artist
- June 9 – Winston Chao, Taiwanese actor, film director, and voice artist
- June 16 - James M. Connor, American actor
- June 17 – Thomas Haden Church, American actor
- June 18 - Barbara Broccoli, American-British producer
- June 25 - Eve Gordon, American actress
- June 27 - Jeremy Swift, English actor
- June 30 - Vincent Klyn, American actor
- July 5
  - Brad Loree, Canadian actor and stuntman
  - Pruitt Taylor Vince, American character actor
- July 10 – Jeff Bergman, American voice actor, comedian and impressionist
- July 11 – Jafar Panahi, Iranian director
- July 14
  - Kyle Gass, American actor and musician
  - Jane Lynch, American actress
- July 15 - Dennis Storhøi, Norwegian actor
- July 17
  - Robin Shou, Hong Kong-American actor, martial artist and stuntman
  - Nancy Giles, American actress
- July 19 – Elizabeth Kaitan, Hungarian-American actress and model
- July 21 – Adrienne King, American actress and voice actress
- July 22 – John Leguizamo, American actor, comedian and producer
- July 23
  - Jon Landau, American film producer (died 2024)
  - Gabrielle Reidy, Irish actress (died 2014)
- July 29 - Delia Sheppard, Danish actress
- July 30
  - Richard Linklater, American director, producer and screenwriter
  - Daniel McDonald, American actor (died 2007)
- August 5
  - Steve Bannos, American actor
  - Vivian Kubrick, American former composer and director
  - John Mariano, American actor
- August 6 – Leland Orser, American actor
- August 7
  - David Duchovny, American actor
  - Rosana Pastor, Spanish actress
- August 10 – Antonio Banderas, Spanish actor
- August 16 – Timothy Hutton, American actor
- August 17 – Sean Penn, American actor
- August 18 – Richard McCabe, Scottish actor
- August 19 - Paul Satterfield, American actor
- August 22 - Regina Taylor, American actress
- August 24 - Takashi Miike, Japanese film director, film producer, and screenwriter
- August 25 - Ashley Crow, American actress
- August 26 - Ola Ray, American actress
- August 28 – Emma Samms, English actress
- August 29 – Viire Valdma, Estonian actress
- September 1 – Tahmineh Milani, Iranian filmmaker
- September 4 - Damon Wayans, American actor, comedian, producer and writer
- September 5 - Denis Forest, Canadian character actor (died 2002)
- September 9
  - Bonnie Aarons, American actress
  - Hugh Grant, English actor
- September 10
  - Nancy Bernstein, American producer (died 2015)
  - Colin Firth, English actor
- September 11 - Anne Ramsay, American actress
- September 12
  - Robert John Burke, American actor
  - Felicity Montagu, English actress
  - Sharon Washington, American actress and playwright
- September 13 - Greg Baldwin, American actor and voice actor
- September 14
  - Melissa Leo, American actress
  - Callum Keith Rennie, British-born Canadian actor
- September 16 - Danny John-Jules, British actor and singer
- September 17
  - Kevin Clash, American puppeteer, director and producer
  - Frédéric Pierrot, French actor
- September 20 - Peter Phelps, Australian actor, singer and writer
- September 21
  - Denis Conway, Irish actor
  - Mary Mara, American actress (died 2022)
- September 25 - Sam Whipple, American actor (died 2002)
- September 27
  - Jean-Marc Barr, French-American actor and director
  - Christopher Cousins, American actor
  - Debi Derryberry, American voice actress
- October 1 - Elizabeth Dennehy, American actress
- October 5 - Daniel Baldwin, American actor, director and producer
- October 9
  - Maddie Blaustein, American voice actress (died 2008)
  - Dana Wheeler-Nicholson, American actress and singer
- October 12 - Hiroyuki Sanada, Japanese actor
- October 13 - Richard Sammel, German actor
- October 15 - Lobo Chan, British actor
- October 17
  - Guy Henry, English actor
  - Rob Marshall, American director and producer
  - Grant Shaud, American actor
- October 18
  - Anthony Guidera, American actor (died 2026)
  - Jean-Claude Van Damme, Belgian actor
- October 24 - BD Wong, American actor
- October 25 – Hong Sang-soo, South Korean director
- October 26 - Patrick Breen, American actor, screenwriter and director
- November 4 - Kathy Griffin, American comedian and actress
- November 5
  - Tilda Swinton, English actress
  - Yolanda Vázquez, Spanish actress
- November 6
  - Lance Kerwin, American actor (died 2023)
  - Denzil Smith, Indian actor and producer
- November 8
  - Elizabeth Avellán, Venezuelan-born American producer
  - Megan Cavanagh, American actress
  - Michael Nyqvist, Swedish actor (died 2017)
- November 9 - Toni Hudson, American actress
- November 11 – Stanley Tucci, American actor and film director
- November 13 – Neil Flynn, American actor and comedian
- November 15 - Susanne Lothar, German actress (died 2012)
- November 17 - RuPaul, American drag queen, television personality, actor, singer, producer and writer
- November 18
  - Elizabeth Perkins, American actress
  - John Shepherd, American actor and producer
- November 20 - Amanda Wyss, American actress
- November 22 - Stéphane Freiss, French actor
- November 26 – Greg Berg, American voice actor
- November 27 - Michael Rispoli, American character actor
- November 29 – Cathy Moriarty, American actress and singer
- November 30
  - Hiam Abbass, Palestinian actress and director
  - Ron Simons, American actor and producer (died 2024)
- December 2 – Justus von Dohnányi, German actor
- December 3
  - Daryl Hannah, American actress
  - Julianne Moore, American actress
- December 9 – Jeff "Swampy" Marsh, American animator, writer, director, producer and voice actor
- December 10
  - Kenneth Branagh, British actor and film director
  - Michael Schoeffling, American actor and model
- December 12 - Stella Gonet, Scottish actress
- December 16 - Koh Chieng Mun, Singaporean actress and comedian
- December 22 - David Pasquesi, American actor and comedian
- December 24 - Eva Tamargo, American actress
- December 26 – Temuera Morrison, New Zealand actor
- December 27
  - Maryam d'Abo, British actress
  - Traci Wolfe, American actress and model
- December 28 - Chad McQueen, American actor, film producer, martial artist and race car driver (died 2024)

== Deaths ==
- January 1 – Margaret Sullavan, 50, American actress, The Shop Around the Corner, The Mortal Storm
- January 3 – Victor Sjöström, 80, Swedish film actor and director, The Phantom Carriage, Wild Strawberries
- January 4 – Dudley Nichols, 64, American screenwriter, Bringing Up Baby, Stagecoach
- January 21 – Matt Moore, 72, Irish-American actor, Seven Brides for Seven Brothers, Coquette
- January 24 – John Miljan, 67, American actor, The Plainsman, Mississippi
- February 3
  - Fred Buscaglione, 38, Italian actor and singer
  - Pierre Watkin, 70, American actor, Pride of the Yankees, The Hunted
- March 19 – Sonya Levien, 71, Russian screenwriter, Oklahoma!, Quo Vadis, Interrupted Melody
- April 5 – Alma Kruger, 88, American actress, His Girl Friday, Saboteur
- April 25 – Hope Emerson, 62, American actress, Caged, Adam's Rib
- May 27 – George Zucco, 74, British actor, The Adventures of Sherlock Holmes, My Favorite Blonde
- June 4 – Lucien Littlefield, 64, American actor, The Cat and the Canary, Dirty Work
- June 29 – Dimples Cooper, 46, Filipina actress, Ang Tatlong Hambog, Miracles of Love
- July 2 – Gene Fowler, 70, American screenwriter, What Price Hollywood?, The Call of the Wild
- July 15 – Lawrence Tibbett, 63, American singer and actor, The Rogue Song, Under Your Spell
- July 26 – Cedric Gibbons, 70, Irish production designer and art director, An American in Paris, The Bad and the Beautiful
- July 29 – Leonora Corbett, 52, British actress, Love on Wheels, Living Dangerously
- August 10 – Frank Lloyd, 74, Scottish director, Mutiny on the Bounty, Cavalcade
- September 4 – Alfred E. Green, 71, American director, Baby Face, Top Banana
- September 5 – Aku Korhonen, 57, Finnish actor
- September 11 – Edwin Justus Mayer, 63, American screenwriter, To Be or Not to Be, A Royal Scandal
- October 11 – Richard Cromwell, 50, American actor, The Lives of a Bengal Lancer, Jezebel
- October 15
  - Maude Eburne, 84, Canadian actress, The Border Legion, Almost Married
  - Clara Kimball Young, 70, American actress, My Official Wife, Kept Husbands
- November 3 – Paul Willis, 60, American silent-film actor, The Fall of a Nation
- November 5
  - Mack Sennett, 80, Canadian-American producer and director, Tillie's Punctured Romance, Tango Tangles
  - Ward Bond, 57, American actor, It's a Wonderful Life, The Searchers, Rio Bravo
- November 14 – Walter Catlett, 71, American actor, comedian, Slightly Scandalous, Henry, the Rainmaker, Here Comes the Groom
- November 16 – Clark Gable, 59, American actor, It Happened One Night, Mutiny on the Bounty, Gone with the Wind
- November 19 – Phyllis Haver, 61, American actress, Chicago, Sal of Singapore
- November 20 – Betty Lawford, 48, British actress, Criminal Lawyer, The Devil Thumbs a Ride
- December 14 – Gregory Ratoff, 67, Russian actor and director, All About Eve, Intermezzo

== Film debuts ==
- Gila Almagor – Burning Sands
- John Astin – The Pusher
- John Barry (film composer) – Never Let Go
- Tom Bell – The Criminal
- Karen Black – The Prime Time
- Bruce Boa – Man in the Moon
- Victor Buono – The Story of Ruth
- Mark Burns – Tunes of Glory
- Dyan Cannon – The Rise and Fall of Legs Diamond
- Queta Carrasco – Macario
- Peter Cellier – Sink the Bismarck!
- Richard Chamberlain – The Secret of the Purple Reef
- Patrick Cranshaw – The Amazing Transparent Man
- Bruce Dern – Wild River
- Roy Dotrice – The Criminal
- Britt Ekland – G.I. Blues
- Albert Finney – The Entertainer
- Jane Fonda – Tall Story
- Derek Francis – The Criminal
- Herbert Fux – Meine Nichte tut das nicht
- Bruno Ganz – Der Herr mit der schwarzen Melone
- Sheila Hancock – Light Up the Sky!
- Diane Ladd – Murder, Inc.
- Marie Laforêt – Purple Noon
- Murray Melvin – The Criminal
- Sylvia Miles – Murder, Inc.
- Peter O'Toole – Kidnapped
- Marisa Paredes – Police Calling 091
- Bryan Pringle – The Challenge
- Robert Redford – Tall Story
- Isela Vega – Verano violento
- Gian Maria Volonté – Under Ten Flags
- Susannah York – Tunes of Glory
