= List of Soviet films of 1960 =

A list of films produced in the Soviet Union in 1960 (see 1960 in film).

== 1960 ==
| Title | Russian title | Director | Cast | Genre | Notes |
|---|---|---|---|---|---|
1960
| 20,000 Leagues Across the Land | Леон Гаррос ищет друга | Marcello Pagliero | Léon Zitrone, Yuri Belov, Tatiana Samoilova | Drama | Soviet-French co-production |
| Alyosha's Love | Алёшкина любовь | Georgi Shchukin and Semyon Tumanov | Leonid Bykov | Comedy | |
| Baltic Skies | Балтийское небо | Vladimir Vengerov | Pyotr Glebov | Drama | |
| Be Careful, Grandma! | Осторожно, бабушка! | Nadezhda Kosheverova | Faina Ranevskaya | Comedy | |
| Blind Musician | Слепой музыкант | Tatyana Lukashevich | Boris Livanov | Drama | |
| Cinderella | Хрустальный башмачок | Rostislav Zakharov, Aleksandr Rou | Raisa Struchkova | Musical | |
| Clouds Over Borsk | Тучи над Борском | Vasili Ordynsky | Inna Gulaya | Drama | |
| Dead Souls | Мёртвые души | Leonid Trauberg | Vladimir Belokurov, Viktor Stanitsyn, Boris Livanov, Alexey Gribov, Anastasia Zuyeva | Comedy, drama | |
| Far from the Motherland | Вдали от Родины | Aleksei Shvachko | | Drama | |
| Farewell, Doves | Прощайте, голуби! | Yakov Segel | Aleksei Loktev | Drama | |
| Five Days, Five Nights | Пять дней, пять ночей | Lev Arnshtam, Heinz Thiel | Wilhelm Koch-Hooge, Annekathrin Bürger, Erich Franz, Heinz-Dieter Knaup, Evgenia Kozireva | Drama | Joint Soviet-East German production |
| A Gentle Creature | Кроткая | Aleksandr Borisov | Iya Savvina | Drama | |
| I Love You, Life! | Люблю тебя, жизнь! | Mikhail Yershov | Gennadi Vernov | Drama | |
| It Was I Who Drew the Little Man | Человечка нарисовал я | Valentina Brumberg and Zinaida Brumberg | | Animation | |
| Khovanshchina | Хованщина | Vera Stroyeva | Mark Reizen | Opera | |
| The Lady with the Dog | Дама с собачкой | Iosif Kheifits | Iya Savvina, Aleksey Batalov, Nina Alisova | Romance | Entered into the 1960 Cannes Film Festival |
| The Magic Weaver | Марья-искусница | Aleksandr Rou | Mikhail Kuznetsov, Ninel Myshkova, Viktor Perevalov, Georgy Millyar | Fantasy | |
| Michman Panin | Мичман Панин | Mikhail Schweitzer | Vyacheslav Tikhonov, Nikolai Sergeyev, Nikita Podgorny, Leonid Kuravlyov, Ivan Pereverzev | Military drama | |
| Matteo Falcone | Matteo Falkone | Tofig Taghizade | Nodar Shashigoglu, Tamilla Aghamirova, Jeyhun Mirzayev | Drama | |
| A Noisy Day | Шумный день | Anatoly Efros, Georgy Natanson | Valentina Sperantova | Comedy | |
| Northern Story | Северная повесть | Yevgeniy Nikolayevich Andrikanis | Oleg Strizhenov | Drama | |
| Probation | Испытательный срок | Vladimir Gerasimov | Oleg Yefremov | Drama | |
| The Queen of Spades | Пиковая дама | Roman Tikhomirov | Oleg Strizhenov | Opera | |
| Russian Souvenir | Русский сувенир | Grigori Aleksandrov | Lyubov Orlova | Comedy | |
| A Simple Story | Простая история | Yuri Yegorov | Nonna Mordyukova, Mikhail Ulyanov, Vasily Shukshin | Drama, Romance | |
| Sleepless Night | Бессонная ночь | Isidor Annensky | Yury Solomin | Drama | |
| Splendid Days | Серёжа | Georgiy Daneliya, Igor Talankin | Borya Barkhatov, Sergei Bondarchuk, Irina Skobtseva | Drama, family | |
| Resurrection | Воскресение | Mikhail Shveitser | Tamara Syomina, Yevgeny Matveyev | Drama | Adaptation of Leo Tolstoy's same named novel |
| Thrice Resurrected | Трижды воскресший | Leonid Gaidai | Alla Larionova | Drama | |
| Until Next Spring | До будущей весны | Viktor Sokolov | Lyudmila Marchenko | Drama | |

== See also ==
- 1960 in the Soviet Union
