= List of Spanish films of 1960 =

A list of films produced in Spain in 1960 (see 1960 in film).

== 1960 ==
Title	Director	Cast	Genre	Notes
Mi calle	Edgar Neville	Conchita Montes, Adolfo Marsillach, Gracita Morales, Agustín González, Rafael Alonso	Drama	
Mission in Morocco	Carlos Arévalo	Lex Barker, Juli Reding, Fernando Rey	Crime	Co-production with United Kingdom
El cochecito	Marco Ferreri	José Isbert, María Luisa Ponte, Chus Lampreave	Black comedy	
El emigrante				
Juanito	Fernando Palacios	Pablito Calvo, Georg Thomalla, Hans von Borsody, Sabine Bethmann, Pilar Cansino, Georg Thomalla	Adventure, drama, western	Co-production with West Germany & Argentina
Un rayo de luz	Luis Lucia	Marisol	Comedy Musical	The film that made Marisol a star
Don Lucio y el hermano pío	José Antonio Nieves Conde	Tony Leblanc, José Isbert, Ana María Custodio, Gracita Morales	Comedy	
