= Girls of the Night (1961 film) =

Japanese drama film

- Film poster
- Directed by: Kinuyo Tanaka
- Written by: Sumie Tanaka (screenplay); Masako Yana (novel)
- Produced by: Ichirō Nagashima; Hideyuki Shiino
- Starring: Chisako Hara; Akemi Kita; Chieko Seki; Masumi Harukawa
- Cinematography: Asakazu Nakai
- Edited by: Kimihiko Nakamura
- Music by: Hikaru Hayashi
- Production company: Tokyo Eiga
- Distributed by: Toho; (initial release); Janus Films; (restored version, U.S.)
- Release date: 5 September 1961 (Japan)
- Running time: 92/93 minutes (Note: The Japanese Movie Database, Kinema Junpo and Stuart Galbraith give 92 minutes running time for the original cinema version, while the digitally restored version is listed with 93 minutes by U.S. distributor Janus Films and the presenting institutions.)
- Country: Japan
- Language: Japanese

Girls of the Night (Japanese: 女ばかりの夜, Hepburn: Onna bakari no yoru; lit. Nothing but Women of the Night), also titled Girls of Dark, is a 1961 Japanese drama film directed by Kinuyo Tanaka and written by Sumie Tanaka. It was the second collaboration of the director and the screenwriter after the 1955 The Eternal Breasts.

== Plot ==
Kuniko, a former prostitute who had been sent to a reformatory following the Prostitution Prevention Law, is released and tries to build a new life for herself. She starts working as a maid in the household of the Takagis, owners of a grocery store. Mrs. Takagi is satisfied with Kuniko at first, but after she finds out about her past, she starts treating her disdainfully. Kuniko takes her revenge by seducing Mr. Takagi while his wife is out visiting relatives and being open about it. Without money and a place to sleep, Kuniko offers her services to a man who turns out to be a detective, and she is sent back to the reformatory.

Kuniko is released again to work in a factory. She decides to be frank about her past to her female co-workers, only to learn that they offer sexual services to other men themselves. Her colleague Kimiko arranges a meeting between Kuniko and three customers, but when Kuniko drives the men away with her provocative behaviour, she is tortured and beaten by Kimiko and her clique. Kuniko returns to the reformatory, whose director Mrs. Nogami confronts the factory owner and the girls involved in the incident.

Kuniko starts working in the rose garden of Mr. and Mrs. Shima. She takes a liking to her job and earns the respect of her employers and her superior Tsukasa, who eventually proposes to her. While Tsukasa is visiting his family, Kuniko's former pimp shows up in her flat and tries to talk her into working for him again. Mrs. Shima hands Kuniko a letter by Tsukasa's mother who declares that she won't allow her son to marry a woman with her past. Mr. and Mrs. Shima tell Kuniko that they are related to Tsukasa's family and that they too see no possibility for a marriage. Kuniko breaks down in tears and disappears afterwards.

Tsukasa returns to the Shimas and declares that he is still intent on marrying Kuniko, even if it means that he will be disowned by his family. Mrs. Nogami shows him a letter by Kuniko, in which she declares that she will always be thankful for having met Tsukasa, who has encouraged her to become a better person. The last scene shows Kuniko working as an ama in Bōsō.

== Cast ==
- Chisako Hara as Kuniko
- Akemi Kita as Chieko
- Chieko Naniwa as Kameju
- Misako Tominaga as Yoshimi
- Kazue Tagami as Matsuko
- Chieko Seki as Koyuki
- Hisako Tahara as Ruko
- Noriko Sengoku as Shizuka
- Masumi Harukawa as Harada
- Mieko Hirabayashi as Yamashita
- Yōko Shinjō as Kishi
- Chikage Awashima as Mrs. Nogami
- Sadako Sawamura as Kitamura
- Fumiko Okamura as Okada
- Kokinji Katsura as Tatsukichi Takagi
- Chieko Nakakita as Yoshi Takagi
- Kin Sugai as factory supervisor
- Eijirō Sakauchi as factory owner Murata
- Yoshiko Nogawa as Kimiko
- Kyōko Kagawa as Mrs. Shima
- Akihiko Hirata as Mr. Shima
- Yōsuke Natsuki as Tsukasa Hayakawa
- Kiyomi Mizunoya as temple priest's wife
- Hisaya Itō as man from the past

== Legacy ==
Girls of the Night was shown as part of a retrospective on Kinuyo Tanaka at the Japan Society, New York, in March 1993.

A 4K restoration of Girls of the Night was presented at the Berkeley Art Museum and Pacific Film Archive and at Film at Lincoln Center in 2022 and at the Harvard Film Archive in 2023.
