= Kegareta Nikutai Seijo =

- Theatrical release poster
- Directed by: Michiyoshi Doi
- Screenplay by: Akira Sugimoto
- Produced by: Mitsugu Ōkura
- Starring: Miyuki Takakura; Mayumi Ozora; Shuntaro Emi
- Cinematography: Mamoru Morita
- Music by: Chumei Watanabe
- Production company: Shintoho
- Release date: November 29, 1958 (Japan)
- Running time: 77 minutes
- Country: Japan
- Language: Japanese

Priestess with the Sullied Flesh (Japanese: 汚れた肉体聖女, Hepburn: Kegareta Nikutai Seijo'; lit. 'Dirty Flesh Saint' also known as Impure Nuns) is a 1958 Japanese drama film directed by Michiyoshi Doi. The film follows the story of an affair between two nuns at a religious boarding school.

== Synopsis ==
Eri becomes pregnant after she is raped by a friend of her brother. Her parents force her to have an abortion and they send her to a religious boarding school to become a nun. Three years later, she meets her new roommate, Anna.

== Cast ==
- Miyuki Takakura as Eri Taira
- Mayumi Ôzora as Yasuko "Anna" Kamiyama
- Shuntaro Emi as Tomohiko Kamiyama
- Toshio Mimura as Kyohei Tsuyama
- Junko Uozumi as Waka Kashiwagi

== See also ==
- List of feature films with lesbian characters
- List of LGBTQ-related films
