= Ikiteiru Koheiji =

- Directed by: Nobuo Aoyagi
- Produced by: Toho
- Music by: Masaru Sato
- Distributed by: Toho
- Release date: August 4, 1957
- Country: Japan
- Language: Japanese

Ikiteiru Koheiji (生きている小平次) aka The Living Koheiji is a 1957 black-and-white musical Japanese film directed by Nobuo Aoyagi.

== Cast ==
- Nakamura Senjaku II as Koheiji
- Kaoru Yachigusa as Ochika
- Hiroshi Akutagawa as Takurō
