= Nobuo Aoyagi =

Japanese film director and producer

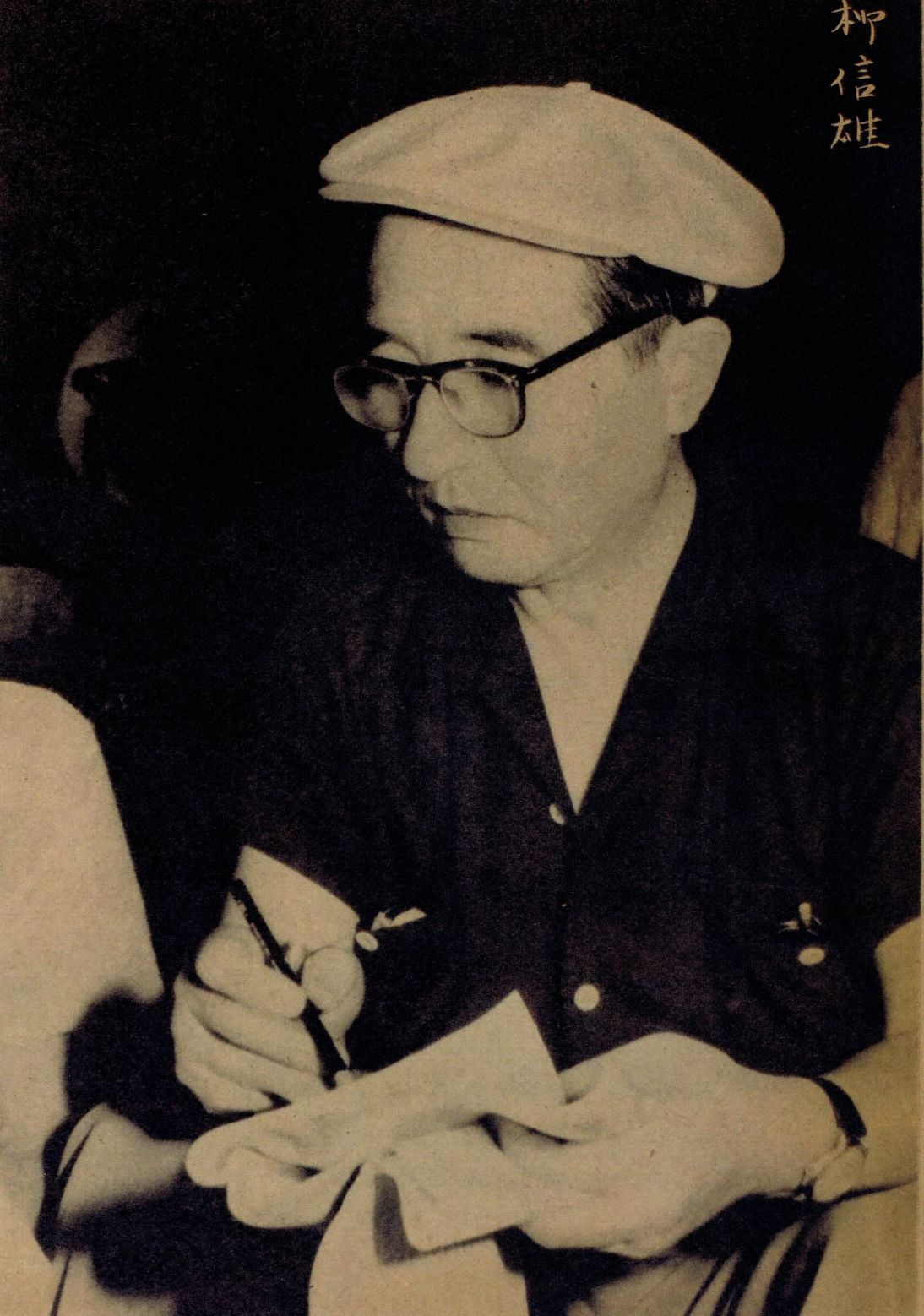
Nobuo Aoyagi

Nobuo Aoyagi (青柳信雄, Aoyagi Nobuo) (27 March 1903 - 17 May 1976) was a Japanese film director and film producer. Born in Kanagawa Prefecture, he attended Meiji University but left before graduating. He worked at the Zenshinza theater troupe before joining the Toho studio in 1937. He debuted as a director in 1940 and was known for a series of live action films starring the manga character Sazae-san. He also helped produce the Mito Komon series on television.

== Filmography ==
- 1938: Producer of Makiba monogatari (牧場物語), "Tale of a Pasture"
- 1943: World of Love (Ai no sekai: Yamaneko Tomi no hanashi)
- 1956: Sazae-san
- 1957: Ikiteiru koheiji
- 1957: Sazae's Youth (Sazae-san no seishun)
