= Chisako Hara =

Japanese actress (1936–2020)

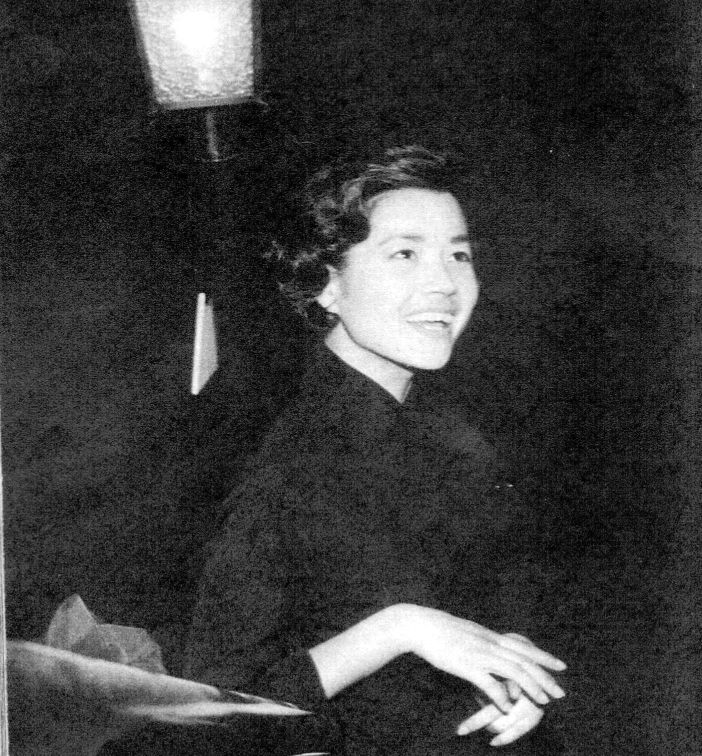
- Hara in 1960
- Born: Chisako Tahara; 1 June 1936; Takaoka Town (now Tosa), Kōchi Prefecture, Japan
- Died: 19 January 2020 (aged 83); Tokyo, Japan
- Occupation: Actress
- Years active: 1956–2019
- Spouse: Akio Jissōji (1963–2006)

Chisako Hara (原知佐子, Hara Chisako; 6 January 1936 – 19 January 2020) was a Japanese actress best known for starring in the Akai and the Kishibe no arubamu series.

== Biography ==
Chisako Hara was born Chisako Tahara (田原知佐子, Tahara Chisako) on 6 January 1936 in Takaoka Town (now Tosa), Kōchi Prefecture. She gave her film debut at the Shintoho studios in 1956, but later moved to Toho, where she had a starring role in Kinuyo Tanaka's Girls of the Night (1961) and smaller parts in films of Mikio Naruse and Shirō Toyoda. In the early 1960s, she became a freelancer and also started appearing on television. During the 1970s, she became famous for her roles in the Akai and Kishibe no arubamu TV series.

Hara was married to director Akio Jissōji from 1963 to 2006 (his death) and also starred in many of his films. In the 2017 book Heretic Film History: The World of Shintoho, Hara discussed her years at the Shintoho studio with Noriko Kitazawa and others.

Her final film appearance was in Spring 2019 in Nosari no shima, which was released after her death in 2021. She died at the age of 84 on 19 January 2020 in a Tokyo hospital of maxillary cancer.

== Selected filmography ==
=== Film ===
- 1960: The Approach of Autumn
- 1961: Girls of the Night
- 1964: Pale Flower
- 1967: The Wife of Seishu Hanaoka
- 1971: The Ceremony
- 1998: Wait and See
- 1998: Murder on D Street
- 2001: Lily Festival
- 2002: Dark Water
- 2021: Nosari no shima

=== Television ===
- 1974–2016: Ultra Series
- 1975–1977: Akai Series
- 1977: Kishibe no arubamu
