= Michiyoshi Doi =

Japanese film director

Michiyoshi Doi (土居通芳) (December 9, 1926 – March 16, 1975) was a Japanese film director. He directed films from the 1950s to the 1970s.

Doi is known for Chiheisen ga giragira (1961).

== Filmography ==
=== Film director ===
He directed 30 films:

- Kegareta Nikutai Seijo (汚れた肉体聖女 ) (1958)
- Chiheisen ga giragira (1961)
- Otoko no chosen (1968)
- Kigeki meoto zenzai (1968)
- Worship of the Flesh (Ensetsu meiji jakyoden) (1968)

=== Screenwriter ===
He was screenwriter of 7 films:

- Yōjasō no Maō (1957)
