= Go to Hell, Hoodlums! =

1960 film

- Directed by: Seijun Suzuki
- Written by: Gan Yamazaki; Kenzaburo Hara (novel)
- Produced by: Eisei Koi
- Starring: Koji Wada; Chikako Hosokawa; Emiko Azuma; Mayumi Shimizu
- Cinematography: Kazue Nagatsuka
- Music by: Seitaro Omori
- Distributed by: Nikkatsu
- Release date: November 23, 1960
- Running time: 80 minutes
- Country: Japan
- Language: Japanese

Go to Hell, Hoodlums! (くたばれ愚連隊, Kutabare gurentai; aka Fighting Delinquents) is a 1960 Japanese film directed by Seijun Suzuki for the Nikkatsu Corporation. It is Suzuki's first color film.

== Cast ==
- Kōji Wada as Sadao Matsudaira
- Chikako Hosokawa as Ikuyo Matsudaira, his grandmother
- Emiko Azuma as Yuki Maebara
- Mayumi Shimizu as Kazuko Izeki
- Kaku Takashina as Sanshiro Izeki, Kazuko's father
- Eitaro Ozawa as Kanjuro Mizoguchi, Sadao's uncle
- Hiroshi Kondo as Nanjo
- Toppa Utsumi as Uchiyama
- Saburo Hiromatsu as Kodaira

== Plot ==
Sadao, a young construction worker, believes himself to be an orphan and in spite of his youthful tempestuousness he is nonetheless a model of honesty and moral integrity: he introduces himself by crashing into the office of a company president in order to claim the indemnity that he owes the foreman's daughter because he caused the man's death by dangerous driving.

Shortly after this altercation, Sadao learns that he actually is the only heir of a noble and rich family from Awaji Island. A messenger tries to convince him by all means to accept the inheritance, but Sadao's moral integrity prevents him from leaving his friends and he refuses to accept this sudden ticket to fortune and high society. When the messenger realizes that the young man is immune to the material temptations such an offer carries, he manages to persuade him with the promise that he will be reunited with his mother.

Pressured by his buddies' enthusiasm, Sadao gives in and leaves for Awaji, where he is welcomed by his aristocratic grandmother. The obaasan ("granny", as he defiantly calls her) is shocked by her grandson's disarming sincerity, a far cry from the hypocritical manners inherent in any high society member. When Sadao finds out that the promise to join his mother was just a trick to attract him to the island, he devotes all his efforts to finding her himself. At the same time, he spends the family fortune on building a public park and a western-style youth hostel on lands owned by the family. However, he is unaware that a shady speculator has plans to appropriate these lands, and that the businessman's girlfriend is none other than Sadao's mother.
