= Morihei Magatani =

See also Morihei Magatani (assistant director).

Morihei Magatani (曲谷守平) (born 23 May 1923) was a Japanese film director.

== Filmography ==
Magatani directed 28 films:

- Yōjasō no Maō (1957)
- Soren dasshutsu: Joguni to nisekyōjin (ソ連脱出 女軍医と偽狂人, lit. Escape from the Soviet Union: Female Army Doctor and the Fake Lunatic) (1958)
- Girl Diver of Spook Mansion (Ama no bakemono yashiki) (1959)
- Blood Sword of the 99th Virgin (Kyuju-kyuhonme no kimusume) (1959)
- Fūryū Kokkei-tan: Sennin Buraku (1961) - Animated film
