= Everything Goes Wrong =

- Directed by: Seijun Suzuki
- Written by: Seiji Hoshikawa; Akira Ichijō (Story)
- Produced by: Kenzō Asada
- Starring: Tamio Kawachi; Ryoko Nezu; Shinsuke Ashida; Tomoko Naraoka
- Cinematography: Izumi Hagiwara
- Edited by: Akira Suzuki
- Music by: Keitarō Miho
- Distributed by: Nikkatsu
- Release date: October 8, 1960
- Running time: 71 minutes
- Country: Japan
- Language: Japanese

Everything Goes Wrong (すべてが狂ってる, Subete ga kurutteru; aka The Cliff and The Madness of Youth) is a 1960 Japanese Sun Tribe film directed by Seijun Suzuki and starring Tamio Kawachi and Ryoko Nezu in her film debut. The story follows Jirō, a rebellious high schooler, in his sadomasochistic and criminal misadventures, specifically as they relate to his girlfriend, mother and her lover. The film was produced and distributed by the Nikkatsu Company. Kinema Junpo called it an early masterpiece in Suzuki's career.

== Plot ==
On a sweltering summer day, a gang of high school delinquents rove through Shinjuku. One, Jirō Sugita, harasses one of the girls, leading to an argument. Jirō leaves the group and returns home, where he lives with his single mother, Misayo. Misayo is the mistress of Keigo Nanbara, a businessman, and Jiro's disapproval of their relationship and feelings of jealousy leave him constantly at odds with both of them. Jirō gets in a fight with Nanbara, tears violently through the house, and steals money from Misayo. Toshimi Tani, a girl from the gang, acts on her crush on Jirō and the two initiate an intimate relationship, though Jirō is decidedly cooler towards the affair than Toshimi. At Misayo's request, Nanbara lectures Jirō about his disreputable lifestyle and tries to set him straight, but is met with mockery.

The following day, Nanbara and Misayo and Jirō and his friends go separately to the same Zushi beach resort. Etsuko, a college student who desperately needs money for an abortion, leads Nanbara to an empty summer home under the pretense of connecting him with Jirō, who he has been searching for in order to make peace. When they arrive, she strips to her undergarments and reveals her real motive was to sell herself to him to obtain money to pay for the abortion. The kindhearted Nanbara refuses her advances but gives her the money she needs. At that moment, Jirō bursts in with his mother in tow and gleefully exposes Nanbara as a philandering liar. However, though Misayo is upset, her genuine love for Nanbara is unshaken, and she begs him to stay with her instead. Enraged and wracked with guilt, Jirō and Toshimi flee and steal a car. Nanbara pursues them; Etsuko leaves with the money, but is waylaid by a group of delinquents who steal it from her. Nanbara finally catches up to Jirō in a hotel room, where he continues to try and reason with Jirō even as the boy alternately mocks him and kisses Toshimi in front of him. When Nanbara is undeterred, Jirō explodes and brutally assaults him with a wrench. Believing he has killed him Jirō and Toshimi escape in the car, and with the police in pursuit, Jirō begins driving at reckless speed until Toshimi screams in fear, begging to be let out of the car. He seems to have a change of heart, but then deliberately drives into the path of an oncoming truck. The moment before he dies, he screams out "Mom!"

Distraught and in pain, Etsuko collapses at the entrance to the subway and falls down a staircase. She is taken to the same hospital as Nanbara, who survived the assault, and even in his gravely wounded state begs the police to forgive Jirō for his actions. Etsuko also survives, but has a miscarriage. The next day at a local bar the youngsters frequented, a journalist for a disreputable paper tells the owner that Jirō is dead. He is disheartened with the current youth culture, but knows that the salacious details of the story will be eaten up by the public. Musing over how he will write the story, he considers starting it with "Today, goodwill between people can't exist anywhere. Everything goes wrong."

== Production ==
In 1956, Nikkatsu Studios made three popular films in the Sun Tribe genre, focused on a contemporary youth subculture noted for their affinity for beach life and jazz music and their progressive attitudes toward sex. The films met with public outcry for moral reasons, and a fourth production was halted at the behest of the Eirin, or Motion Picture Code of Ethics Committee. However, the genre later resurged and included Everything Goes Wrong. The film was based on the author Akira Ichijō's story High Teen Mistress (ハイティーン情婦 Hai tīn jōfu), adapted for the screen by Seiji Hoshikawa. Former fashion model Yoshiko Yatsu made her feature film debut. Hit singer Kyu Sakamoto has a cameo appearance, performing a musical number. The film employed an improvisational jazz score and free-flowing camera work in a semi-documentary style. Production was completed on September 13, 1960.

== Release ==
The film was released by Nikkatsu in Japan on October 8, 1960. The film journal Kinema Junpo posited that any deficiencies in the story were overshadowed by Seijun Suzuki's unique directorial style. They placed it in the Japanese New Wave and called it an early masterpiece in Suzuki's oeuvre. In writing his book on Japanese filmmakers, Chris D. called it "A find, and highly recommended." He noted in it common elements with Nagisa Oshima's own Sun Tribe film Cruel Story of Youth (also 1960) but found Everything Goes Wrong to be less pretentious.

Nikkatsu released Everything Goes Wrong on DVD in Japan on May 21, 2005. It included a photo gallery and the original film trailer. The release was done in conjunction with the release of three other films directed by Seijun Suzuki and in anticipation of the following year's 50th anniversary of his directorial debut.

== Soundtrack ==
Everything Goes Wrong

Soundtrack album by Keitarō Miho
- Released: February 23, 2007
- Genre: Soundtrack, Jazz
- Label: Think

On February 23, 2007, the Japanese label Think! Records reissued the soundtrack on CD as a part of its Cine Jazz series, which featured 1960s Nikkatsu Action film scores. The music was derived from Keitarō Miho's film score. Tracks 29 and 30 are bonus tracks.

=== Track listing ===
No.	Translation	Japanese title	Romanization
1.	"-Nikkatsu Logo-"	-日活マーク-	-Nikkatsu māku-
2.	"Jirō Sugita"	杉田次郎	Sugita Jirō
3.	"Toshimi Tani"	谷敏美	Tani Toshimi
4.	"(Musical Performance Scene)"	（劇中演奏シーン）	(Gekichū ensō shīn)
5.	"(Musical Performance Scene)"	（劇中演奏シーン）	(Gekichū ensō shīn)
6.	"A Present for Mama"	母へのプレゼント	Haha e purezento
7.	"The Split Pt. 1"	別れましょうPt.1	Wakaremashō pāto wan
8.	"The Split Pt. 2"	別れましょうPt.2	Wakaremashō pāto tsū
9.	"Jirō and Toshimi Pt. 1"	次郎と敏美Pt.1	Jirō to Toshimi pāto wan
10.	"Jirō and Toshimi Pt. 2"	次郎と敏美Pt.2	Jirō to Toshimi pāto tsū
11.	"Jirō and Toshimi Pt. 3"	次郎と敏美Pt.3	Jirō to Toshimi pāto surī
12.	"Jirō and Toshimi Pt. 4"	次郎と敏美Pt.4	Jirō to Toshimi pāto fuoa
13.	"Jirō and Toshimi Pt. 5"	次郎と敏美Pt.5	Jirō to Toshimi pāto fuaibu
14.	"A Mistress's Child"	妾の子	Mekake no ko
15.	"Nanbara the Chump! Pt. 1"	南原のヤツ!Pt.1	Nanbara no yatsu! pāto wan
16.	"Nanbara the Chump! Pt. 2"	南原のヤツ!Pt.2	Nanbara no yatsu! pāto tsū
17.	"No Excuses Pt. 1"	言い訳はみっともないぜPt.1	Iiwake wa mittomonai ze pāto wan
18.	"No Excuses Pt. 2"	言い訳はみっともないぜPt.2	Iiwake wa mittomonai ze pāto tsū
19.	"Jirō's Regret Pt. 1"	次郎の涙Pt.1	Jirō no namida pāto wan
20.	"Jirō's Regret Pt. 2"	次郎の涙Pt.2	Jirō no namida pāto tsū
21.	"Jirō's Regret Pt. 3"	次郎の涙Pt.3	Jirō no namida pāto surī
22.	"We Want the Loot Pt. 1"	金が欲しいんだろPt.1	Kane ga hoshindaro pāto wan
23.	"We Want the Loot Pt. 2"	金が欲しいんだろPt.2	Kane ga hoshindaro pāto tsū
24.	"(Musical Performance Scene)"	（劇中演奏シーン）	(Gekichū ensō shīn)
25.	"Now Talk"	話をしよう	Hanashi o shi yō
26.	"No One Understands"	俺の気持ちは分らない	Ore no kimochi wa wakaranai
27.	"But I'm Not Guilty"	誰の罪でもないんです	Dare no tsumi demo naindesu
28.	"Everything Goes Wrong"	すべてが狂ってる	Subete ga kurutteru
29.	n/a	（M2／NG track）	n/a
30.	n/a	（M28／NG track）	n/a
