= The Approach of Autumn =

1960 Japanese film

- Directed by: Mikio Naruse
- Written by: Ryōzō Kasahara
- Produced by: Mikio Naruse
- Starring: Nobuko Otowa; Kamatari Fujiwara
- Cinematography: Jun Yasumoto
- Edited by: Eiji Ooi
- Music by: Ichirō Saitō
- Production company: Toho
- Distributed by: Toho
- Release date: 1 October 1960 (Japan)
- Running time: 79 minutes
- Country: Japan
- Language: Japanese

The Approach of Autumn (秋立ちぬ, Aki tachinu), also titled Autumn Has Already Started, is a 1960 Japanese drama film directed by Mikio Naruse. It was written by Ryōzō Kasahara.

== Plot ==
After the death of his father, Hideo and his mother Shigeko leave Ueda, Nagano, for Tokyo, where she starts a job at a ryokan, while Hideo moves in with his uncle's family. He befriends the slightly younger Junko, the daughter of Shigeko's employer Naoyo, herself the mistress of a married businessman who finances the ryokan. The two children start making repeated trips around the city together, which finally lead them to the ocean that Hideo only knows from pictures. Hideo is eventually left alone when his mother runs off with a guest and Junko moves away after her father sold her mother's business.

== Cast ==
- Kenzaburō Ōsawa as Hideo
- Nobuko Otowa as Shigeko, Hideo's mother
- Kamatari Fujiwara as Hideo's uncle
- Natsuko Kahara as Hideo's aunt
- Yosuke Natsuki as Shotaro
- Futaba Ichiki as Junko (credited as Futaba Hitotsugi)
- Murasaki Fujima as Naoyo, Junko's mother
- Daisuke Katō as Tomioka
- Hisako Hara as Harue
- Seizaburō Kawazu as Kasao
- Kin Sugai as ryokan maid

== Reception ==
In his 2008 Critical Handbook of Japanese Film Directors, film historian Alexander Jacoby called The Approach of Autumn a "precise, clear‒eyed story of a child's emotional life, with something of the bittersweet quality of [Hiroshi] Shimizu".

== Legacy ==
The Approach of Autumn was screened at the Berkeley Art Museum and Pacific Film Archive in 2006.
