= 1962 in film =

The year 1962 in film involved some very significant events. Releases in the United States included the hit films To Kill a Mockingbird, The Longest Day, and Lawrence of Arabia, the latter winning seven Academy Awards including Best Picture and Best Director. Universal Pictures and Paramount Pictures also celebrated their 50th anniversaries.

== Top-grossing films (U.S.) ==
The top ten 1962 released films by box office gross in North America are as follows:

Highest-grossing films of 1962
Rank	Title	Distributor	Domestic rentals
1	The Longest Day	20th Century Fox	$15,250,000
2	Lawrence of Arabia	Columbia	$15,000,000
3	The Music Man	Warner Bros.	$8,000,000
4	That Touch of Mink	Universal	$7,942,000
5	Mutiny on the Bounty	MGM	$7,410,000
6	To Kill a Mockingbird	Universal	$7,112,000
7	Hatari!	Paramount	$7,000,000
8	Gypsy	Warner Bros.	$6,000,000
9	Bon Voyage! The Interns	Buena Vista; Columbia	$5,000,000
10	In Search of the Castaways	Buena Vista	$4,900,000

== Events ==
- February – Warner Bros. buys the film rights for My Fair Lady for the unprecedented sum of $5.5 million plus 47¼% of the gross over $20 million.
- May – The Golden Horse Film Festival and Awards are officially founded by the Taiwanese government.
- June 18 – MCA Inc. finalize their merger with Decca-Universal.
- July 25 – Darryl F. Zanuck, one of the founders of 20th Century Fox, becomes president, replacing Spyros Skouras. Skouras becomes chairman of the board.
- August 5 – Hollywood legend Marilyn Monroe (1926-1962) is found dead of a drug overdose.
- September 7 – Filming of Sergei Bondarchuk's War and Peace begins and will continue for another 5 years.
- October 5 – Dr. No launches the James Bond series, the second longest-running film franchise of all time (next to Godzilla), still running 60 years later (No Time to Die, 2021). It also launches the career of Sean Connery.

== Awards ==
Academy Awards:

Best Picture: Lawrence of Arabia – Horizon-Spiegel-Lean, Columbia
Best Director: David Lean – Lawrence of Arabia
Best Actor: Gregory Peck – To Kill a Mockingbird
Best Actress: Anne Bancroft – The Miracle Worker
Best Supporting Actor: Ed Begley – Sweet Bird of Youth
Best Supporting Actress: Patty Duke – The Miracle Worker
Best Foreign Language Film: Sundays and Cybele (Les dimanches de ville d'Avray), directed by Serge Bourguignon, France

Golden Globe Awards:

Drama:
Best Picture: Lawrence of Arabia
Best Actor: Gregory Peck – To Kill a Mockingbird
Best Actress: Geraldine Page – Sweet Bird of Youth

Comedy or Musical:
Best Picture − Comedy: That Touch of Mink
Best Picture − Musical: The Music Man
Best Actor: Marcello Mastroianni – Divorce Italian Style
Best Actress: Rosalind Russell – Gypsy

Other
Best Director: David Lean – Lawrence of Arabia
Best Supporting Actor: Omar Sharif – Lawrence of Arabia
Best Supporting Actress: Angela Lansbury – The Manchurian Candidate

Palme d'Or (Cannes Film Festival):

Keeper of Promises (O Pagador de Promessas), directed by Anselmo Duarte, Brazil

Golden Lion (Venice Film Festival):

Family Diary (Cronaca familiare, Journal intime), directed by Valerio Zurlini, France / Italy
My Name is Ivan (Ivanovo detstvo), directed by Andrei Tarkovsky, USSR

Golden Bear (Berlin Film Festival):

A Kind of Loving, directed by John Schlesinger, United Kingdom

== 1962 film releases ==
All of these films are from the United States unless stated.

=== January–March ===
- January 1962
  - 1 January
    - Heaven and Earth Magic
    - Sanjuro (Japan)
  - 9 January
    - The Nun and the Sergeant
  - 11 January
    - Only Two Can Play
  - 12 January
    - Bachelor Flat
  - 14 January
    - I Thank a Fool
  - 17 January
    - The Intruder
  - 18 January
    - My Geisha
  - 19 January
    - Tender Is the Night
    - A View from the Bridge
  - 26 January
    - The Three Stooges Meet Hercules
- February 1962
  - 7 February
    - Four Horsemen of the Apocalypse
    - Light in the Piazza
  - 10 February
    - Sergeants 3
  - 12 February
    - The Bellboy and the Playgirls
  - 15 February
    - Pontius Pilate
  - 21 February
    - The Couch
    - Walk on the Wild Side
  - 28 February
    - Too Late Blues
- March 1962
  - 1 March
    - Posse from Hell
  - 5 March
    - Rome Adventure
  - 7 March
    - The Premature Burial
  - 9 March
    - State Fair
  - 10 March
    - Journey to the Seventh Planet
  - 14 March
    - The Road to Hong Kong
  - 21 March
    - Hitler
    - Sweet Bird of Youth
    - Gorath (Japan)
  - 23 March
    - Satan in High Heels
    - Satan Never Sleeps
  - 28 March
    - Hand of Death
    - The Manster (U.S./Japan)
    - Six Black Horses

=== April–June ===
- April 1962
  - 2 April
    - The Broken Land
  - 5 April
    - Moon Pilot
  - 6 April
    - Ivan's Childhood (U.S.S.R)
  - 11 April
    - All Fall Down
    - Follow That Dream
    - House of Women
    - The Magic Sword
  - 12 April
    - Cape Fear
  - 13 April
    - Experiment in Terror
  - 17 April
    - The Counterfeit Traitor
  - 18 April
    - The Horizontal Lieutenant
  - 19 April
    - Five Finger Exercise
  - 22 April
    - Hands of a Stranger
    - The Man Who Shot Liberty Valance
  - 23 April
    - Escape from Zahrain
  - 25 April
    - Fire Monsters Against the Son of Hercules (Italy)
- May 1962
  - 3 May
    - The Brain That Wouldn't Die
    - Invasion of the Star Creatures
  - 9 May
    - Jessica
    - War Hunt
  - 17 May
    - Bon Voyage!
  - 24 May
    - The Inspector
    - Lonely Are the Brave
  - 25 May
    - The Cabinet of Caligari
    - When the Girls Take Over
  - 29 May
    - Hatari!
- June 1962
  - 6 June
    - 13 West Street
    - Big Red
    - Lad, A Dog
  - 9 June
    - Eegah
  - 13 June
    - It Happened in Athens
    - Lolita
    - Merrill's Marauders
  - 14 June
    - That Touch of Mink
  - 15 June
    - Mr. Hobbs Takes a Vacation
  - 19 June
    - The Music Man
  - 20 June
    - Confessions of an Opium Eater
    - The Pigeon That Took Rome
    - Ride the High Country
  - 21 June
    - Boys' Night Out
  - 26 June
    - Hell Is for Heroes
  - 27 June
    - Safe at Home!
  - 29 June
    - Beauty and the Beast

=== July–September ===
- July 1962
  - 3 July
    - Birdman of Alcatraz
    - The Creation of the Humanoids
    - Tarzan Goes to India
  - 4 July
    - Tales of Terror
    - The Three Stooges in Orbit
  - 5 July
    - Panic in Year Zero!
  - 7 July
    - Advise & Consent
  - 15 July
    - Kujira Gami aka The Whale God (Japan)
  - 16 July
    - Jack the Giant Killer
  - 17 July
    - Air Patrol
  - 21 July
    - Black Gold
  - 25 July
    - Hemingway's Adventures of a Young Man
  - 26 July
    - The Lion
    - The Notorious Landlady
  - 28 July
    - The Miracle Worker
- August 1962
  - 1 August
    - Kid Galahad
  - 2 August
    - The Underwater City
  - 3 August
    - The Spiral Road
  - 7 August
    - The Wonderful World of the Brothers Grimm
  - 8 August
    - The Interns
  - 11 August
    - King Kong vs. Godzilla (Japan)
  - 17 August
    - Two Weeks in Another Town
    - Guns of Darkness
  - 22 August
    - Five Weeks in a Balloon
  - 29 August
    - The 300 Spartans
- September 1962
  - 15 September
    - Convicts 4
  - 16 September
    - Harakiri (Japan)
    - Billy Budd
  - 25 September
    - The Longest Day
  - 26 September
    - Carnival of Souls
  - 27 September
    - Gigot

=== October–December ===
- October 1962
  - 1 October
    - A Kind of Loving
  - 3 October
    - Zotz!
  - 4 October
    - Sodom and Gomorrah
  - 5 October
    - The Chapman Report
    - Dr. No – (U.K.)
  - 10 October
    - If a Man Answers
    - Long Day's Journey into Night
  - 16 October
    - Requiem for a Heavyweight
  - 18 October
    - Phaedra
  - 22 October
    - Escape from East Berlin
  - 24 October
    - The Manchurian Candidate
    - Tower of London
  - 25 October
    - Tonight for Sure
    - The War Lover
  - 31 October
    - Period of Adjustment
    - What Ever Happened to Baby Jane?
- November 1962
  - 1 November
    - How the West Was Won
    - Gypsy
  - 2 November
    - The Reluctant Saint
  - 8 November
    - Mutiny on the Bounty
  - 14 November
    - In Search of the Castaways
  - 21 November
    - It's Only Money
    - Two for the Seesaw
    - Girls! Girls! Girls!
  - 27 November
    - The Main Attraction
- December 1962
  - 2 December
    - Pressure Point
  - 6 December
    - Billy Rose's Jumbo
  - 10 December
    - Lawrence of Arabia
  - 12 December
    - Five Miles to Midnight
    - Freud: The Secret Passion
  - 17 December
    - Gay Purr-ee
  - 19 December
    - Taras Bulba
  - 22 December
    - The Trial
  - 25 December
    - To Kill a Mockingbird
    - Who's Got the Action?
  - 26 December
    - David and Lisa
    - Days of Wine and Roses
  - 31 December
    - 40 Pounds of Trouble

== Notable films released in 1962 ==
United States unless stated

=== # ===
- The 300 Spartans, starring Ralph Richardson, Richard Egan, Diane Baker
- 40 Pounds of Trouble, starring Tony Curtis, Suzanne Pleshette, and Larry Storch

=== A ===
- Abhijan (The Expedition), directed by Satyajit Ray – (India)
- Advise & Consent, directed by Otto Preminger, starring Henry Fonda, Charles Laughton, Walter Pidgeon, Don Murray, Peter Lawford
- Alaverdoba, directed by Giorgi Shengelaia – (Georgia)
- All Fall Down, directed by John Frankenheimer, starring Eva Marie Saint and Warren Beatty
- All Night Long, starring Patrick McGoohan and Richard Attenborough – (U.K.)
- All Souls' Day (Zaduszki) – (Poland)
- The Amphibian Man (Chelovek-amfibiya) – (U.S.S.R.)
- Asli-Naqli (Real and Fake), starring Dev Anand – (India)
- Atraco a las tres (Robbery at 3 O'Clock) – (Spain)
- Attack of the Normans (I normanni), directed by Giuseppe Vari – (Italy)
- An Autumn Afternoon (Sanma no aji), directed by Yasujirō Ozu – (Japan)
- The Awful Dr. Orloff (Gritos en la noche), directed by Jesús Franco – (Spain)

=== B ===
- Baat Ek Raat Ki (A Tale of One Night), starring Dev Anand – (India)
- Bachelor Flat, starring Terry-Thomas, Tuesday Weld, Celeste Holm
- Bees Saal Baad – (India)
- The Bellboy and the Playgirls, directed by Francis Ford Coppola and Fritz Umgelter
- Big and Little Wong Tin Bar, starring Jackie Chan and Sammo Hung – (Hong Kong)
- Billy Budd, directed by and starring Peter Ustinov, with Robert Ryan and Terence Stamp – (U.K.)
- Billy Rose's Jumbo, starring Doris Day and Jimmy Durante
- Birdman of Alcatraz, directed by John Frankenheimer, starring Burt Lancaster, Karl Malden, Telly Savalas
- Boccaccio '70, directed by Federico Fellini, Mario Monicelli, Vittorio De Sica and Luchino Visconti, starring Anita Ekberg and Sophia Loren – (Italy)
- Bon Voyage!, starring Fred MacMurray and Jane Wyman
- The Boys, directed by Sidney J. Furie, starring Richard Todd – (U.K.)
- Boys' Night Out, starring Kim Novak and James Garner
- The Brain That Wouldn't Die, starring Virginia Leith
- The Brainiac (El baron del terror), directed by Chano Urueta – (Mexico)
- The Bread of Those Early Years (Das Brot der frühen Jahre) – (West Germany)
- The Broken Land, starring Kent Taylor, Diana Darrin and Jack Nicholson

=== C ===
- Cape Fear, directed by J. Lee Thompson, starring Gregory Peck, Robert Mitchum, Polly Bergen, Telly Savalas
- Captain Clegg (released as Night Creatures in the U.S.), directed by Peter Graham Scott – (U.K.)
- Carnival of Souls, directed by Herk Harvey
- Carry On Cruising, starring Sid James and Kenneth Williams – (U.K.)
- Cartouche, starring Jean-Paul Belmondo and Claudia Cardinale – (France/Italy)
- The Chapman Report, directed by George Cukor, starring Jane Fonda, Shelley Winters, Claire Bloom, Efrem Zimbalist Jr.
- Chased by the Dogs (El less wal kilab) – (Egypt)
- Cléo from 5 to 7, directed by Agnès Varda – (France)
- The Condemned of Altona (I sequestrati di Altona), directed by Vittorio De Sica, starring Sophia Loren and Maximilian Schell – (Italy)
- Convicts 4, starring Ben Gazzara, Stuart Whitman, Vincent Price, Ray Walston, Sammy Davis Jr.
- The Counterfeit Traitor, directed by George Seaton, starring William Holden
- Crazy Paradise (Det tossede paradis), directed by Gabriel Axel and starring Dirch Passer – (Denmark)
- Crooks Anonymous, starring Leslie Phillips and Julie Christie
- The Cursed Palace, starring Salah Zulfikar and Mariam Fakhr Eddine – (Egypt)

=== D ===
- Damon and Pythias (Il tiranno di Siracusa), directed by Curtis Bernhardt – (U.S./Italy)
- A Date at the Tower, directed by Ezz El-Dine Zulficar, starring Salah Zulfikar and Soad Hosny – (Egypt)
- David and Lisa, starring Keir Dullea and Janet Margolin
- Days of Wine and Roses, directed by Blake Edwards, starring Jack Lemmon, Lee Remick, Charles Bickford, Jack Klugman
- Dead Man's Evidence, directed by Francis Searle – (U.K.)
- The Devil's Agent (Im Namen des Teufels), directed by John Paddy Carstairs – (U.K./West Germany/Ireland)
- Le Doulos (The Finger Man), directed by Jean-Pierre Melville, starring Jean-Paul Belmondo – (France)
- Dr. No, first James Bond film, directed by Terence Young, starring Sean Connery, Joseph Wiseman, Jack Lord, Ursula Andress – (U.K.)
- Dungeon of Harrow, directed by Pat Boyette

=== E ===
- The Easy Life (Il sorpasso), directed by Dino Risi, starring Vittorio Gassman and Jean-Louis Trintignant – (Italy)
- Eclipse (L'Eclisse), directed by Michelangelo Antonioni, starring Alain Delon and Monica Vitti – (Italy/France)
- Eighteen in the Sun (Diciottenni al sole), directed by Camillo Mastrocinque – (Italy)
- Electra, directed by Michael Cacoyannis, starring Irene Papas – (Greece)
- The Elusive Corporal (Le Caporal épinglé), directed by Jean Renoir, starring Jean-Pierre Cassel and Claude Brasseur – (France)
- Escape from East Berlin, directed by Robert Siodmak, starring Don Murray
- Escape from Zahrain, starring Yul Brynner, Sal Mineo and Jack Warden
- Eva (released in the U.K. as Eve), starring Jeanne Moreau, Stanley Baker and Virna Lisi – (Italy/France)
- Experiment in Terror, directed by Blake Edwards, starring Glenn Ford, Lee Remick, Stefanie Powers, Ross Martin
- The Exterminating Angel (El ángel exterminador), directed by Luis Buñuel – (Mexico)

=== F ===
- The Fabulous Baron Munchausen (Baron Prášil), directed by Karel Zeman – (Czechoslovakia)
- Family Diary (Cronaca familiare), starring Marcello Mastroianni – (Italy)
- The Female: Seventy Times Seven (Setenta veces siete), starring Isabel Sarli – (Argentina)
- Fire Monsters Against the Son of Hercules
- Five Finger Exercise, starring Rosalind Russell
- Five Miles to Midnight, starring Sophia Loren
- Five Weeks in a Balloon
- Follow That Dream, starring Elvis Presley, Arthur O'Connell, Joanna Moore
- The Four Days of Naples (Le Quattro giornate di Napoli) – (Italy)
- Four Horsemen of the Apocalypse, directed by Vincente Minnelli, starring Glenn Ford, Ingrid Thulin, Yvette Mimieux
- Freud: The Secret Passion, directed by John Huston, starring Montgomery Clift, Susannah York, Larry Parks
- The Fury of Hercules (La furia di Ercole), written and directed by Gianfranco Parolini – (Italy)

=== G ===
- Gay Purr-ee, an animated musical with the voices of Judy Garland and Mel Blanc
- Geronimo, starring Chuck Connors
- Gigot, starring Jackie Gleason
- Girls! Girls! Girls!, starring Elvis Presley
- Go to Blazes, directed by Michael Truman – (U.K.)
- The Golden Arrow (L'arciere delle mille e una notte), directed by Antonio Margheriti – (Italy)
- Gorath, directed by Ishirō Honda – (Japan)
- The Grim Reaper (La commare secca), directed by Bernardo Bertolucci – (Italy)
- Gundamma Katha, starring N. T. Rama Rao – (India)
- Guns of Darkness, directed by Anthony Asquith, starring David Niven and James Robertson Justice – (U.K.)
- Gypsy, directed by Mervyn LeRoy, starring Rosalind Russell, Karl Malden, Natalie Wood

=== H ===
- H.M.S. Defiant, starring Alec Guinness and Dirk Bogarde – (U.K.)
- Half Ticket, starring Kishore Kumar and Madhubala – (India)
- Hand of Death, starring John Agar
- Hands of a Stranger, directed by Newt Arnold
- Harakiri (Seppuku), directed by Masaki Kobayashi – (Japan)
- Hatari!, directed by Howard Hawks, starring John Wayne, Red Buttons, Hardy Krüger, Elsa Martinelli
- Hell Is for Heroes, starring Steve McQueen and Bobby Darin
- Hemingway's Adventures of a Young Man, directed by Martin Ritt, starring Richard Beymer, Diane Baker, Corinne Calvet, Paul Newman
- Hero's Island, starring James Mason and Rip Torn
- Hombre de la esquina rosada (Man on Pink Corner) – (Argentina)
- The Horizontal Lieutenant, starring Jim Hutton and Paula Prentiss
- The Horrible Dr. Hichcock (L'orribile segreto del Dr. Hichcock), directed by Riccardo Freda – (Italy)
- House of Women, starring Shirley Knight and Constance Ford
- How the West Was Won, starring James Stewart, Henry Fonda, Eli Wallach, John Wayne, Debbie Reynolds, Gregory Peck, Carroll Baker, George Peppard and more
- Hussar Ballad (Gusarskaya ballada) – (U.S.S.R.)
- Hussar of the Dead (El Húsar de la Muerte), (Restored, originally released in 1925) – (Chile)

=== I ===
- If a Man Answers, starring Bobby Darin and Sandra Dee
- In Search of the Castaways, starring Hayley Mills and Maurice Chevalier
- In the Affirmative (L'Amour avec des si), directed by Claude Lelouch – (France)
- In the French Style, starring Jean Seberg
- The Inn on the River (Das Gasthaus an der Themse), directed by Alfred Vohrer – (West Germany)
- The Inspector, aka Lisa, directed by Mark Robson, starring Dolores Hart
- The Invisible Dr. Mabuse (Die Unsichtbaren Krallen des Dr. Mabuse), starring Wolfgang Preiss – (West Germany)
- The Intruder, directed by Roger Corman, starring William Shatner
- The Iron Maiden, starring Anne Helm and Jeff Donnell
- It Happened in Athens, starring Jayne Mansfield – (Greece/United States)
- It's Only Money, directed by Frank Tashlin. starring Jerry Lewis and Joan O'Brien
- Ivan's Childhood (Ivanovo detstvo), directed by Andrei Tarkovsky – (U.S.S.R.)

=== J ===
- Jack the Giant Killer, starring Kerwin Mathews
- Jessica, starring Angie Dickinson
- La Jetée, directed by Chris Marker – (France)
- Jigsaw, starring Jack Warner – (U.K.)
- Journey to the Seventh Planet, directed by Sid Pink – (Denmark)
- Jules and Jim, directed by François Truffaut, starring Jeanne Moreau and Oskar Werner – (France)

=== K ===
- Kanchanjangha, directed by Satyajit Ray – (India)
- Kid Galahad, starring Elvis Presley, Gig Young, Lola Albright, Charles Bronson
- A Kind of Loving, directed by John Schlesinger, starring Alan Bates – (U.K.)
- King Kong vs. Godzilla, directed by Ishirō Honda – (Japan)
- Knife in the Water (Nóż w wodzie), directed by Roman Polanski – (Poland)

=== L ===
- The L-Shaped Room, directed by Bryan Forbes, starring Leslie Caron and Tom Bell – (U.K.)
- Lawrence of Arabia, directed by David Lean, starring Peter O'Toole, Omar Sharif, Anthony Quinn, Alec Guinness, José Ferrer – (UK/US)
- The Legend of Lobo, a Walt Disney production
- Life for Ruth, starring Patrick McGoohan and Michael Craig – (U.K.)
- Light in the Piazza, starring Olivia de Havilland, Yvette Mimieux, George Hamilton
- The Lion, starring William Holden and Trevor Howard
- Lisa (aka The Inspector), starring Stephen Boyd – (U.S./U.K.)
- Lolita, directed by Stanley Kubrick, starring James Mason, Shelley Winters, Peter Sellers, Sue Lyon
- The Loneliness of the Long Distance Runner, directed by Tony Richardson, starring Tom Courtenay – (U.K.)
- Lonely Are the Brave, starring Kirk Douglas, Walter Matthau, Gena Rowlands, George Kennedy, Carroll O'Connor
- Lonely Boy, a documentary about Paul Anka – (Canada)
- Long Day's Journey into Night, directed by Sidney Lumet, starring Katharine Hepburn
- The Longest Day, starring John Wayne, Henry Fonda, Richard Burton, Sean Connery, Robert Mitchum, Rod Steiger and more
- Love, Thy Name Be Sorrow (Koiya koi nasuna koi), directed by Tomu Uchida – (Japan)
- Love at Twenty, a film in 5 segments directed by François Truffaut, Shintaro Ishihara, Andrzej Wajda, Renzo Rossellini and Marcel Ophüls – (International)
- Love on a Pillow, starring Brigitte Bardot – (France)
- Lulu, directed by Rolf Thiele, starring Nadja Tiller – (Austria)

=== M ===
- Madison Avenue, starring Dana Andrews, Jeanne Crain, Eleanor Parker
- Mafioso, starring Alberto Sordi – (Italy)
- The Magic Sword, directed by Bert I. Gordon
- The Magnificent Concubine (Yang Kwei Fei) – (Hong Kong)
- The Main Attraction, starring Pat Boone
- Mamma Roma, directed by Pier Paolo Pasolini, starring Anna Magnani – (Italy)
- The Man of Gold (Az aranyember) – (Hungary)
- The Man Who Shot Liberty Valance, directed by John Ford, starring John Wayne, James Stewart, Lee Marvin, Vera Miles, Edmond O'Brien, Woody Strode
- The Manchurian Candidate, directed by John Frankenheimer, starring Frank Sinatra, Laurence Harvey, Janet Leigh, Leslie Parrish, Angela Lansbury
- March on Rome (La marcia su Roma), starring Ugo Tognazzi and Vittorio Gassman – (Italy)
- Merrill's Marauders, directed by Samuel Fuller, starring Jeff Chandler and Ty Hardin
- Flying Clipper (Traumreise unter weissen Segeln), a documentary directed by Hermann Leitner and Rudolf Nussgruber – (West Germany)
- The Memorial Gate for Virtuous Women (열녀문 – Yeolnyeomun), directed by Shin Sang-ok – (South Korea)
- The Miracle Worker, directed by Arthur Penn, starring Anne Bancroft and Patty Duke
- Mister Magoo's Christmas Carol, (on NBC-TV)
- Mix Me a Person, directed by Leslie Norman, starring Anne Baxter, Donald Sinden and Adam Faith – (U.K.)
- Mondo Cane, directed by Paolo Cavara, Franco Prosperi and Gualtiero Jacopetti – (Italy)
- A Monkey in Winter (Un singe en hiver), directed by Henri Verneuil – (France)
- Mr. Hobbs Takes a Vacation, starring James Stewart and Maureen O'Hara
- Moon Pilot, starring Tom Tryon
- The Music Man, starring Robert Preston, Shirley Jones, Buddy Hackett, Paul Ford, Ron Howard
- Mutiny on the Bounty, starring Marlon Brando and Trevor Howard
- My Geisha, starring Shirley MacLaine
- My Life to Live (Vivre sa vie), directed by Jean-Luc Godard, starring Anna Karina – (France)

=== N ===
- Night of the Eagle (retitled Burn, Witch, Burn! in the U.S.), starring Janet Blair
- Nine Days in One Year (9 dney odnogo goda) – (U.S.S.R.)
- The Notorious Landlady, starring Kim Novak, Jack Lemmon and Fred Astaire

=== O ===
- On the Beat, starring Norman Wisdom – (U.K.)
- Only Two Can Play, starring Peter Sellers
- Operation Snatch, directed by Robert Day and starring Terry-Thomas and George Sanders – (U.K.)
- O Pagador de Promessas (The Keeper of Promises), directed by Anselmo Duarte – (Brazil)

=== P ===
- Panic in Year Zero!, starring Ray Milland and Frankie Avalon
- Period of Adjustment, starring Jane Fonda, Jim Hutton, Anthony Franciosa, Lois Nettleton
- Phaedra, directed by Jules Dassin, starring Melina Mercouri and Anthony Perkins – (Greece)
- The Phantom of the Opera, starring Herbert Lom – (U.K.)
- The Pigeon That Took Rome, starring Charlton Heston
- The Pirates of Blood River, directed by John Gilling – (U.K.)
- Pitfall (Otoshiana) – (Japan)
- Play It Cool, starring Billy Fury – (U.K.)
- Pontius Pilate, starring Jean Marais, Jeanne Crain, Basil Rathbone
- Premature Burial, directed by Roger Corman, starring Ray Milland, Hazel Court, Heather Angel
- Pressure Point, starring Sidney Poitier and Bobby Darin
- Pretty Foe by Esmail Koushan (Iran)
- Professor, starring Shammi Kapoor – (India)
- The Puzzle of the Red Orchid (Das Rätsel der Roten Orchidee), directed by Helmut Ashley – (West Germany)

=== R ===
- Redhead (Die Rote or La rossa) – (West Germany/Italy)
- Requiem for a Heavyweight, starring Anthony Quinn, Jackie Gleason, Mickey Rooney, Julie Harris
- Revenge of the Snakes (Yılanların öcü) – (Turkey)
- Ride the High Country (a.k.a. Guns in the Afternoon), directed by Sam Peckinpah, starring Joel McCrea and Randolph Scott
- The Road to Hong Kong, directed by Norman Panama, starring Bing Crosby, Bob Hope and Joan Collins
- Roaring Years (Anni ruggenti), starring Nino Manfredi – (Italy)
- Rome Adventure, starring Angie Dickinson and Suzanne Pleshette
- Der rote Rausch (The Red Intoxication), starring Klaus Kinski – (Austria)

=== S ===
- Safe at Home!, starring Mickey Mantle and Roger Maris
- Sahib Bibi Aur Ghulam (King, Queen and Slave), starring Meena Kumari and Guru Dutt – (India)
- Salvatore Giuliano, directed by Francesco Rosi – (Italy)
- Samar, directed by and starring George Montgomery
- Sanjuro (Tsubaki Sanjûrô), directed by Akira Kurosawa, starring Toshiro Mifune – (Japan)
- Satan in High Heels, starring Meg Myles and Grayson Hall
- Sergeants 3, starring Frank Sinatra, Dean Martin, Sammy Davis Jr., Peter Lawford, Joey Bishop
- Seven Seas to Calais (Il dominatore dei sette mari), directed by Rudolph Maté – (Italy)
- Shaheed, starring Musarrat Nazir, Talish, Allauddin, Ejaz, Saqi (Pakistani film on the Palestinian-Israeli Conflict)
- She'll Have to Go (released in the United States as Maid for Murder), directed by Robert Asher – (U.K.)
- She Knows Y'Know, directed by Montgomery Tully – (U.K.)
- Sherlock Holmes and the Deadly Necklace/ Sherlock Holmes und das Halsband des Todes (German) a Sherlock Holmes mystery directed by Terence Fisher, written by Curt Siodmak, starring Christopher Lee as Holmes and Thorley Walters as Watson
- Slaughter of the Vampires (La strage dei vampiri), directed by Roberto Mauri – (Italy)
- Solo for Sparrow, directed by Gordon Flemyng – (U.K.)
- Some People, starring Kenneth More – (U.K.)
- Something's Got to Give, starring Marilyn Monroe and Dean Martin (unfinished)
- The Spiral Road, starring Rock Hudson and Gena Rowlands
- State Fair, starring Pat Boone, Tom Ewell, Ann-Margret, Pamela Tiffin, Bobby Darin
- The Suitor (Le Soupirant) – (France)
- Sundays and Cybele (Les dimanches de ville d'Avray), starring Hardy Krüger and Nicole Courcel – (France)
- Sweet Bird of Youth, starring Paul Newman, Geraldine Page, Shirley Knight, Ed Begley, Rip Torn
- Swordsman of Siena (La congiura dei dieci/Le mercenaire), starring Stewart Granger – (Italy/France)
- A Symposium on Popular Songs, a Disney animation

=== T ===
- The Tale of Zatoichi (Zatōichi monogatari), directed by Kenji Misumi – (Japan)
- The Tale of Zatoichi Continues (Zoku Zatōichi Monogatari), starring Shintaro Katsu – (Japan)
- Tales of Terror, starring Vincent Price, Peter Lorre and Basil Rathbone
- Taras Bulba, starring Yul Brynner and Tony Curtis
- Tarzan Goes to India, Jock Mahoney's first film as Tarzan
- Tender Is the Night, starring Jennifer Jones
- Term of Trial, starring Laurence Olivier and Simone Signoret – (U.K.)
- The Testament of Dr. Mabuse (Das Testament des Dr. Mabuse), starring Wolfgang Preiss – (West Germany)
- That Touch of Mink, starring Cary Grant and Doris Day
- Thérèse Desqueyroux, starring Emmanuelle Riva and Philippe Noiret – (France)
- The Three Stooges In Orbit, starring the Three Stooges
- Time to Remember, directed by Charles Jarrott – (U.K.)
- To Kill a Mockingbird, directed by Robert Mulligan, starring Gregory Peck
- Tobacco (Tyutyun) – (Bulgaria)
- Tonny, directed by Nils R. Müller and Per Gjersøe – (Norway)
- Too Late Blues, directed by John Cassavetes, starring Bobby Darin and Stella Stevens
- Tower of London, starring Vincent Price
- Treasure of Silver Lake, directed by Harald Reinl – (West Germany)
- The Trial (Le Procès), directed by and starring Orson Welles with Anthony Perkins and Jeanne Moreau – (France/Italy/West Germany)
- The Trial of Joan of Arc (Procès de Jeanne d'Arc), directed by Robert Bresson – (France)
- Tudor – (Romania)
- The Twelve Chairs (Las doce sillas), directed by Tomás Gutiérrez Alea – (Cuba)
- Two for the Seesaw, starring Shirley MacLaine and Robert Mitchum
- Two Half Times in Hell (Két félidő a pokolban), directed by Zoltán Fábri – (Hungary)
- Two Weeks in Another Town, directed by Vincente Minnelli, starring Kirk Douglas, Edward G. Robinson, George Hamilton, Cyd Charisse

=== U ===
- The Unscrupulous Ones (Os Cafajestes), directed by Ruy Guerra – (Brazil)

=== V ===
- A Very Private Affair, starring Brigitte Bardot – (France)
- A View from the Bridge (Vu du Pont), directed by Sidney Lumet, starring Raf Vallone – (France/Italy)
- Violent Life (Una vita violenta), directed by Paolo Heusch and Brunello Rondi – (Italy)
- Vive le Tour, documentary by Louis Malle – (France)

=== W ===
- Walk on the Wild Side, starring Laurence Harvey, Capucine, Jane Fonda, Barbara Stanwyck
- Waltz of the Toreadors (a.k.a. The Amorous General), directed by John Guillermin, starring Peter Sellers – (U.K.)
- The War Lover, directed by Philip Leacock, starring Steve McQueen, Robert Wagner and Shirley Anne Field.
- War of the Buttons (La Guerre des boutons) – (France)
- We Joined the Navy, starring Kenneth More – (U.K.)
- What Ever Happened to Baby Jane?, directed by Robert Aldrich, starring Bette Davis and Joan Crawford
- Who's Got the Action? starring Dean Martin and Lana Turner
- The Witch's Curse (Maciste all'inferno), directed by Riccardo Freda – (Italy)
- The Wonderful World of the Brothers Grimm, starring Laurence Harvey and Claire Bloom

=== Z ===
- Zorro the Avenger
- Zotz!, directed by William Castle, starring Tom Poston

== Short film series ==
- Looney Tunes (1930–1969)
- Terrytoons (1930–1964)
- Merrie Melodies (1931–1969)
- Bugs Bunny (1940–1964)
- Yosemite Sam (1945–1963)
- Speedy Gonzales (1953–1968)

== Births ==
- January 1
  - Carlos Gomez, American actor
  - Elizabeth Gorcey, American filmmaker, actress and writer
- January 4 – Michael France, American screenwriter (d. 2013)
- January 5 – Suzy Amis Cameron, American actress
- January 7
  - Kiiri Tamm, Estonian actress
  - Hallie Todd, American actress
- January 9 - Conrad Goode, American actor, screenwriter, screenwriter, producer and musician
- January 10 – C. Martin Croker, American animator and voice actor (d. 2016)
- January 11
  - Kim Coles, American actress, comedian and game show host
  - Melanie Hill, British actress
- January 13 - Trace Adkins, American singer and actor
- January 16 - Peter Lurie, American voice actor, sports anchor and television personality
- January 17
  - Jim Carrey, Canadian actor and comedian
  - Denis O'Hare, American actor
- January 19 - Kelly Coffield Park, American actress and comedian
- January 20 - Sophie Thompson, British actress
- January 21 - Marie Trintignant, French actress (d. 2003)
- January 22
  - Tamra Davis, American director
  - Robert Mailhouse, American actor and musician
  - Piotr Polk, Polish actor and singer
- January 23
  - Pete Koch, American actor
  - Boris McGiver, American actor
  - Richard Roxburgh, Australian actor, writer, producer and director
- January 29 - Nicholas Turturro, American actor
- February 2 - Michael T. Weiss, American actor
- February 4
  - Clint Black, American singer-songwriter and actor
  - Jim O'Heir, American actor and comedian
  - Michael Riley, Canadian actor
- February 5 – Jennifer Jason Leigh, American actress
- February 7 - Eddie Izzard, English stand-up comedian, actor and writer
- February 8 - Martin Wuttke, German actor and director
- February 10 - Philip Glenister, English actor
- February 12 - Diane Franklin, American actress and producer
- February 13 – Michele Greene, American actress
- February 14
  - Sakina Jaffrey, American actress
  - Kirk Thatcher, American writer, producer and director
- February 16 - Alexa Kenin, American actress (d. 1985)
- February 17 – Lou Diamond Phillips, American actor
- February 18 - Julie Strain, American actress and model (d. 2021)
- February 22
  - Steve Irwin, Australian zookeeper, television personality, conservationist, actor (d. 2006)
  - Sylva Kelegian, American actress
  - Ethan Wayne, American actor
- February 27 – Adam Baldwin, American actor
- March 2 - Jon Bon Jovi, American singer, songwriter, guitarist, and actor
- March 8
  - Leon Robinson, American actor and singer
  - Cecilia Yip, Hong Kong actress
- March 10 – Jasmine Guy, American actress, singer, dancer and director
- March 11 - Jeffrey Nordling, American actor
- March 12
  - Julia Campbell, American actress
  - Chris Sanders, American actor, animator, director and voice actor
  - Titus Welliver, American actor
- March 18
  - Thomas Ian Griffith, American actor, producer, and screenwriter
  - Etsushi Toyokawa, Japanese actor
- March 20 – Stephen Sommers, American director, screenwriter and producer
- March 21
  - Matthew Broderick, American actor
  - Kathy Greenwood, Canadian actress and comedian
  - Rosie O'Donnell, American actress and comedian
- March 23 - Jenny Wright, American actress
- March 25
  - Thom Bierdz, American actor
  - Marcia Cross, American actress
- March 26
  - Marita Geraghty, American actress
  - Eric Allan Kramer, American actor
- March 29 - Tyra Ferrell, American actress
- March 30 - Robert Blanche, American actor (d. 2020)
- April 2 – Clark Gregg, American actor, director and screenwriter
- April 3 - Jennifer Rubin, American actress and model
- April 5 - Lana Clarkson, American actress and model (d. 2003)
- April 15
  - Tom Kane, American actor and voice actor (d. 2026)
  - Alex Veadov, American actor
- April 18
  - Jeff Dunham, American ventriloquist, stand-up comedian and actor
  - Cynthia Ettinger, American character actress
- April 20 - Peter Segal, American director, producer, screenwriter and actor
- April 23 - John Hannah, Scottish actor
- April 24 - Jason Salkey, English actor
- April 27 – James LeGros, American actor
- May 1 - Maia Morgenstern, Romanian actress
- May 2 - Elizabeth Berridge, American actress
- May 5 - Manoj Sood, Indo-Canadian actor
- May 7 - David Franklin, Australian actor
- May 9 - Sean McNamara, American director, producer, actor and screenwriter
- May 12 – Emilio Estevez, American actor
- May 14 - Danny Huston, American actor, director and writer
- May 17 - Craig Ferguson, Scottish-American television host, comedian, author and actor
- May 18
  - Nathaniel Parker, English actor
  - Karel Roden, Czech actor
- May 23 - Karen Duffy, American actress and writer
- May 26 – Bobcat Goldthwait, American actor, comedian and director
- May 27
  - Bin Bunluerit, Thai actor and director
  - Steven Brill, American actor, producer, director and screenwriter
- May 29 - John D. LeMay, American former actor
- May 31 - Sebastian Koch, German actor
- June 4 - Lindsay Frost, American former actress
- June 5
  - Jeff Garlin, American comedian and actor
  - Ken Hudson Campbell, American actor
- June 6 - Todd Kimsey, American actor (d. 2016)
- June 7 - Lance Reddick, American actor and musician (d. 2023)
- June 10
  - Gina Gershon, American actress
  - Tzi Ma, Hong Kong-American actor
- June 12
  - Paul Schulze, American actor
  - Jodi Thelen, American actress
- June 13 – Ally Sheedy, American actress
- June 16 - Arnold Vosloo, South African actor
- June 19 – Paula Abdul, American singer
- June 22 - Nicholas Lea, Canadian actor
- June 23 - Billy Wirth, American actor and producer
- June 27
  - Emel Heinreich, Turkish-Austrian actress, author and film-director
  - Tony Leung Chiu-wai, Hong Kong actor
  - Laird Macintosh, American actor and comedian
- June 30 - Predrag Bjelac, Serbian actor
- July 1 - Andre Braugher, American actor (d. 2023)
- July 2 - Doug Benson, American comedian, television host and actor
- July 3
  - Tom Cruise, American actor
  - Thomas Gibson, American actor
- July 4 - Neil Morrissey, English actor, voice actor, comedian, singer and businessman
- July 7 - Akiva Goldsman, American screenwriter, producer and director
- July 8 - Oreste Baldini, Italian actor and voice actor
- July 13
  - Michael Jace, American former character actor
  - Tom Kenny, American actor, voice actor, singer and comedian
  - Paul Mercier, American actor and voice actor
- July 15 – Martin Roach, Canadian actor
- July 18 - Lee Arenberg, American actor
- July 19 – Anthony Edwards, American actor
- July 20 – Carlos Alazraqui, voice actor
- July 23 - Eriq La Salle, American actor, director, writer and producer
- July 29
  - Kevin Chapman, American actor
  - Kevin Spirtas, American actor
- July 31
  - Al Sapienza, American actor
  - Wesley Snipes, American actor
- August 1
  - Jesse Borrego, American actor
  - Thomas Jay Ryan, American actor
- August 2 - Cynthia Stevenson, American actress
- August 6 – Michelle Yeoh, Malaysian actress
- August 12 - Miss Cleo, American television personality (d. 2016)
- August 13 – John Slattery, American actor
- August 14 - Steve Reevis, Native American actor (d. 2017)
- August 15 - David Zayas, Puerto Rican actor
- August 16 – Steve Carell, American actor, comedian, producer, writer and director
- August 17 - John Marshall Jones, American actor
- August 20
  - Geoffrey Blake, American actor
  - Ravil Isyanov, Russian actor (d. 2021)
- August 21 - Cleo King, American actress
- August 24 – David Koechner, American actor and comedian
- August 25 - Rusty Schwimmer, American character actress and singer
- August 27 – Vic Mignogna, American voice actor
- August 28 - David Fincher, American filmmaker
- August 29
  - Ian James Corlett, Canadian-American voice actor
  - Lycia Naff, American actress
- August 31 – Dee Bradley Baker, American voice actor
- September 1 - Michelle Meyrink, Canadian former actress
- September 2 - Caroline O'Connor, Anglo-Australian actress and singer
- September 8
  - Moya Brady, English actress
  - Thomas Kretschmann, German actor
- September 11 – Kristy McNichol, American actress
- September 12 - Amy Yasbeck, American actress
- September 15 – Scott McNeil, Australian-Canadian voice actor
- September 16 - Jonathan Pienaar, South African actor, writer and comedian (d. 2025)
- September 17
  - Paul Feig, American actor, director, comedian and filmmaker
  - Baz Luhrmann, Australian director
  - Dustin Nguyen, Vietnamese actor and martial artist
- September 21 - Mark Holden, Canadian actor, writer and producer
- September 22 - Rob Morrow, American actor and director
- September 24 – Nia Vardalos, Canadian-American actress and producer
- September 25
  - David Bedella, American actor
  - Aida Turturro, American actress
- September 26 – Melissa Sue Anderson, American actress
- October 1
  - Hakeem Kae-Kazim, Nigerian-British actor and producer
  - Esai Morales, American actor
- October 2 – Jeff Bennett, American actor and voice actor
- October 4 - Ulf Friberg, Swedish actor, screenwriter and director
- October 5
  - Ricky Harris, American producer, actor and comedian (d. 2016)
  - Joseph Malerba, French actor
- October 6 - Joaquín Cosío, Mexican actor
- October 8 - Richard Lintern, English actor
- October 9 - Peter Hewitt, English director and writer
- October 10 - Tony Pitts, English actor
- October 11 – Joan Cusack, American actress
- October 12 – Deborah Foreman, American actress
- October 13
  - T'Keyah Crystal Keymáh, American actress and singer
  - Kelly Preston, American actress (d. 2020)
- October 14
  - Trevor Goddard, English actor (d. 2003)
  - Chris Thomas King, American musician and actor
- October 15 - Simon Kunz, English actor
- October 16 - Christian Stolte, American character actor
- October 17
  - Peter Greenwood, Australian special effects technician and voice actor (d. 2021)
  - Mike Judge, American actor, animator, filmmaker and musician
- October 19 - Antonio Monda, Italian writer and filmmaker
- October 20 - David Mickey Evans, American director and screenwriter
- October 22 - Bob Odenkirk, American actor, comedian, writer, director and producer
- October 26 – Cary Elwes, English actor
- October 27 - Brontis Jodorowsky, Mexican-French actor
- October 28
  - Jason Watkins, English actor
  - Daphne Zuniga, American actress
- November 1 - Brenda Chapman, American writer, storyboard artist and director
- November 5 - Michael Gaston, American actor
- November 7 - Tracie Savage, American actress and journalist
- November 9 - Rick Batalla, American actor
- November 10 - Barry Del Sherman, American actor
- November 11
  - Gerard Horan, British actor
  - Demi Moore, American actress and producer
- November 14
  - Laura San Giacomo, American actress
  - Harland Williams, Canadian-American actor and comedian
- November 18 - Tim Guinee, American actor
- November 19 – Jodie Foster, American actress and director
- November 28
  - Rose Abdoo, American actress and comedian
  - Jon Stewart, American actor and comedian
- November 29 – Andrew McCarthy, American actor
- November 30 - P. J. Hogan, Australian director and screenwriter
- December 2 - Brendan Coyle, British-Irish actor
- December 6 - Janine Turner, American actress
- December 8 - Wendell Pierce, American actor
- December 9
  - Keith A. Glascoe, American actor (d. 2001)
  - Felicity Huffman, American actress
- December 10 - Scott Capurro, American comedian, writer and actor
- December 13 - Jim Fall, American director and producer
- December 14 - Ginger Lynn, American pornographic actress
- December 18
  - James Sie, American actor
  - Michel Vuillermoz, French actor and screenwriter
- December 19 – Jill Talley, American actress
- December 22 – Ralph Fiennes, English actor
- December 23 - Peter Ramsey, American storyboard artist, story artist, director, writer and producer

== Deaths ==
- January 13 – Ernie Kovacs, 42, American comedian, actor, North to Alaska, Bell, Book and Candle
- January 28 – Hermann Wlach, 77, Austrian actor, The Pearl Maker of Madrid
- February 1 – Carey Wilson, American screenwriter, Mutiny on the Bounty
- February 19 – James Barton, American actor, Here Comes the Groom, Yellow Sky
- February 20 – Halliwell Hobbes, 84, British actor, Gaslight, That Hamilton Woman
- February 27 – Willie Best, 48, American actor, Nothing but the Truth, The Red Dragon
- February 28 – Chic Johnson, 70, American comedian, actor, Hellzapoppin'
- March 17 – Frank Orth, 82, American actor, Nancy Drew... Detective, Here Come the Girls
- April 10 – Michael Curtiz, 75, Hungarian-born director, Casablanca, The Adventures of Robin Hood
- April 15 – Clara Blandick, 85, American actress, The Wizard of Oz, Tom Sawyer
- April 17 – Louise Fazenda, 66, American actress, Tillie's Punctured Romance, Alice in Wonderland
- April 22
  - Angus MacPhail, 59, British screenwriter, Spellbound, The Wrong Man
  - Vera Reynolds, 62, American actress, The Night Club, Feet of Clay
- May 14 – Florence Auer, 82, American actress, The Bishop's Wife, State of the Union
- June 2 – Aeneas MacKenzie, 72, Scottish screenwriter, The Ten Commandments, Ivanhoe
- June 6 – Guinn "Big Boy" Williams, 63, American actor, Nevada, Southwest Passage
- June 19
  - Frank Borzage, 69, American director, actor, A Farewell to Arms, 7th Heaven
  - Will Wright, 68, American actor, Quantrill's Raiders, Alias Jesse James
- June 24 – Lucile Watson, 83, Canadian actress, Waterloo Bridge, Made for Each Other
- July 2 – Valeska Suratt, 80, American stage and screen actress, The Immigrant
- July 4 – Rex Bell, 58, American actor, Broadway to Cheyenne, Law and Lead
- July 13 – Jerry Wald, 50, American screenwriter and producer, Mildred Pierce, Peyton Place
- July 23 – Victor Moore, 86, American actor, It Happened on Fifth Avenue, Louisiana Purchase
- July 30 – Myron McCormick, 54, American actor, The Hustler, No Time for Sergeants
- August 5 – Marilyn Monroe, 36, American actress, Hollywood icon, Gentlemen Prefer Blondes, Some Like It Hot
- August 23 – Hoot Gibson, 70, American actor, Action, The Horse Soldiers
- September 7 – Louis King, 64, American director, Typhoon, Green Grass of Wyoming
- October 2 – Frank Lovejoy, 50, American actor, The Hitch-Hiker, Goodbye, My Fancy
- October 6 – Tod Browning, 82, American director, Dracula, Freaks
- October 26 – Louise Beavers, 60, American actress, Holiday Inn, The Jackie Robinson Story
- November 15 – Irene, American costume designer, Shall We Dance, Midnight Lace
- December 15 – Charles Laughton, 63, British actor, Spartacus, Witness for the Prosecution
- December 17 – Thomas Mitchell, 70, American actor, It's a Wonderful Life, Gone with the Wind
- December 21 – Syd Saylor, 67, American actor, The Lost Jungle, The Three Mesquiteers
- December 23 – Luis Alberni, 76, Spanish actor, Svengali, The Count of Monte Cristo
- December 28 – Kathleen Clifford, 75, American actress, When the Clouds Roll By, Richard the Lion-Hearted
- December 29 – Hugh Sinclair, 59, British actor, The Saint's Vacation, Judgment Deferred

== Film debuts ==
- Erick Avari – Kanchenjungha
- Bernardo Bertolucci (director) – The Grim Reaper
- Peter Bowles – Live Now, Pay Later
- Jackie Chan – Big and Little Wong Tin Bar
- Julie Christie – Crooks Anonymous
- Tom Courtenay – Private Potter
- Charles Durning – The Password Is Courage
- Robert Duvall – To Kill a Mockingbird
- Samantha Eggar – Dr. Crippen
- Sally Field – Moon Pilot
- Frank Finlay – Life for Ruth
- Edward Fox – The Loneliness of the Long Distance Runner
- Paul Gleason – Panic in Year Zero!
- Sid Haig – The Firebrand
- John Hurt – The Wild and the Willing
- Ronald Lacey – The Boys
- Meat Loaf – State Fair
- Ian McShane – The Wild and the Willing
- Arthur Malet – Convicts 4
- Bill McKinney – Secret File: Hollywood
- Sarah Miles – Term of Trial
- Franco Nero – Pelle viva
- Sydney Pollack (actor) – War Hunt
- Jack Riley – Days of Wine and Roses
- W. Morgan Sheppard – Strongroom
- Tom Skerritt – War Hunt
- Terence Stamp – Term of Trial
- John Standing – A Pair of Briefs
- David Warner – We Joined the Navy
- William Windom – To Kill a Mockingbird
