= 1962 in France =

- Decades: 1940s; 1950s; 1960s; 1970s; 1980s
- See also: History of France; Timeline of French history; List of years in France

Events from the year 1962 in France.

== Incumbents ==
- President: Charles de Gaulle
- Prime Minister: Michel Debré (until 14 April), Georges Pompidou (starting 14 April)

== Events ==
- 15 January – Designer Yves Saint Laurent launches his own fashion house.
- 3 February – Liner SS France begins her maiden voyage with the Compagnie Générale Transatlantique to New York.
- 5 February – President Charles de Gaulle calls for Algeria to be granted independence.
- 8 February – Charonne (Paris Métro) Massacre.
- 18 March – Evian agreements are signed by France and the F.L.N. ending the Algerian War.
- 19 March – Formal cease-fire comes into operation following Evian Accords, however, the OAS continues its terrorist attacks against Algerians.
- 24 March – OAS leader Edmond Jouahud is arrested in Oran.
- 26 March – France shortens the term for military service from 26 months to 18.
- 8 April – Évian Accords referendum held and adopted with a majority of 90%.
- 13 April – OAS leader Edmond Jouhaud is sentenced to death.
- 20 April – OAS leader Raoul Salan is arrested in Algiers.
- 2 May – An OAS bomb explodes in Algeria – this and other attacks kill 110 and injure 147.
- 23 May – Raoul Salan, founder of the Organisation armée secrète, is sentenced to life imprisonment.
- 29 May – Negotiations between the OAS and the FLA lead to a real armistice in Algeria.
- 3 June – Air France charter flight Chateau de Sully, a Boeing 707, over-runs the runway at Orly Airport in Paris; 130 of 132 passengers are killed, two flight attendants survive.
- 17 June – The OAS signs a truce with the FLN in Algeria, but a day later announces that it will continue the fight on behalf of French Algerians.
- 22 June – An Air France Boeing 707 jet crashes into terrain during bad weather in Guadeloupe, West Indies, killing all 113 on board.
- 30 June – The last soldiers of the French Foreign Legion leave Algeria.
- 1 July – Supporters of Algerian independence win 99% majority in a referendum.
- 2 July – Charles de Gaulle accepts Algerian independence; France recognizes it the next day.
- 5 July – Algeria becomes independent from France.
- 5 July – Oran massacre takes place in Algeria.
- 20 July – France and Tunisia reestablish diplomatic relations.
- 31 July – Algeria proclaims independence.
- 22 August – Petit-Clamart attack: An assassination attempt is made against President Charles de Gaulle by machine-gunning his car in the Paris suburbs. The mastermind, Jean Bastien-Thiry, will later be executed.
- 5 October – The French National Assembly censures the proposed referendum to sanction presidential elections by popular mandate; Prime Minister Georges Pompidou resigns, but President de Gaulle asks him to stay in office.
- 28 October – Presidential Election Referendum held, favours the election of the president by universal suffrage.
- 18 November – Legislative Election held.
- 25 November – Legislative Election held.
- 27 November – President Charles De Gaulle orders Georges Pompidou to form a government.
- 29 November – An agreement is signed between Britain and France to develop the Concorde supersonic airliner.
- Around 20,000 Harkis, indigenous Muslim Algerians who fought as auxiliary soldiers on the French side in the Algerian War, with their families flee Algeria for metropolitan France fearing unofficial reprisals in their home country.

== Arts and literature ==
- 18 March – "Un premier amour" by Isabelle Aubret (music by Claude-Henri Vic, text by Roland Stephane Valade) wins the Eurovision Song Contest 1962 (staged in Luxemburg) for France.

== Sport ==
- 24 June–15 July – Tour de France, won by Jacques Anquetil.

== Births ==
=== January to March ===
- 8 January – Nelly Viennot, soccer referee
- 21 January -
  - Isabelle Nanty, actress
  - Marie Trintignant, actress (died 2003)
- 25 January – Bruno Martini, soccer player (died 2020)
- 28 January – Philippe Vercruysse, international soccer player
- 1 February – Manuel Amoros, international soccer player
- 2 February – Philippe Claudel, writer
- 10 February – Yves Tavernier, alpine skier
- 13 February – Claudine Emonet, alpine skier
- 14 February
  - Philippe Sella, international rugby union player
  - Thierry Toutain, race walker
- 17 February – Walter Ciofani, hammer thrower
- 20 February – Pierre Quinon, pole vaulter and Olympic gold medallist (died 2011)
- 22 February – Olivier Latry, organist, improviser and Professor of Organ
- 7 March – Pascale Sourisse, businesswoman
- 8 March – Isabelle Pasquet, politician
- 18 March – Vincent Barteau, cyclist
- 21 March – Gilles Lalay, motorcycle enduro and rally raid competitor (died 1992)
- 25 March – Pierre Morice, soccer player

=== April to June ===
- 2 April – Pierre Carles, documentarist
- 2 May -
  - Jean-François Bernard, cyclist
  - Alexandra Boulat, photographer (died 2007)
- 28 May – François-Henri Pinault, businessman
- 31 May – Philippe Gache, motor racing driver
- 7 June – Thierry Hazard, singer
- 12 June – Philippe Tibeuf, soccer player
- June – Pascal Riché, journalist

=== July to September ===
- 3 July – Philippe Verneret, alpine skier
- 22 July -
  - Jacques Glassmann, soccer player
  - Jean-Claude Leclercq, cyclist
- 23 July – Alain Lefèvre, pianist and composer
- 28 July – Emmanuelle Jouannet, international law professor
- 6 August – Marc Lavoine, singer and actor
- 7 August – Alain Robert, rock and urban climber
- 15 August – Paul Henderson, Australian politician and Chief Minister of the Northern Territory
- 19 August – Valérie Kaprisky, actress
- 27 August – Fabrice Poullain, soccer player
- 30 August – François Delecour, rally driver
- 11 September – Pierre Huyghe, artist
- 20 September – Jean-Louis Garcia, soccer player
- 25 September – Juliette Noureddine, singer, songwriter and composer
- 27 September – Christelle Guignard, alpine skier

=== October to December ===
- 4 October – Jean-Luc Sassus, soccer player (died 2015)
- 13 October – Valérie Létard, politician
- 15 October – Guy Georges, serial killer
- 17 October – Yvon Pouliquen, soccer manager, former player
- 22 October – Laurent Paganelli, journalist, former soccer player
- 24 October – Yves Bertucci, soccer manager
- 30 October – Arnaud Montebourg, politician
- 2 November – Mireille Delunsch, opera soprano
- 2 November – Marcellin Nadeau, Member of Parliament
- 11 November – Thierry Goudet, soccer manager, former player
- 13 November – Lydia Gouardo, rape victim
- 23 November – Philippe Renaud, canoer and Olympic medallist
- 6 December – Claude Chirac, younger daughter of French president Jacques Chirac
- 7 December – Alain Blondel, decathlete
- 17 December – Christophe Hondelatte, television and radio host
- 26 December – Jean-Marc Ferreri, international soccer player
- 28 December – Michel Petrucciani, jazz pianist (died 1999)

=== Full date unknown ===
- Luc Delahaye, photographer
- Philippe Goitschel, skier and Olympic medallist
- Martin Matje, illustrator (died 2004)
- Dominique Moulon, historian of art and technology

== Deaths ==
=== January to March ===
- 8 January – Roger Ducret, fencer and Olympic gold medallist (born 1888)
- 21 January – Georges Gimel, painter (born 1898)
- 24 January – André Lhote, sculptor and painter (born 1885)
- 29 January – Louis Gernet, philologist and sociologist (born 1882)
- 4 February -
  - Charles Basle, American auto racer (born 1885)
  - Daniel Halévy, historian (born 1872)
- 5 February – Jacques Ibert, composer (born 1890)
- 19 February – Émile Armand, individualist anarchist (born 1872)
- 3 March – Pierre Benoit, novelist (born 1886)
- 6 March – René Laforgue, psychiatrist and psychoanalyst (born 1894)

=== April to June ===
- 1 April – Jules Boucherit, violinist and teacher (born 1877)
- 10 April – Lucienne Delyle, singer (born 1917; leukemia)
- 17 April – Pierre Larquey, actor (born 1884)
- 4 May – Cécile Vogt-Mugnier, neurologist (born 1875)
- 23 May – Louis Coatalen, automobile engineer (born 1879)
- 1 June – Joseph Darnand, Bishop (born 1879)
- 5 June – Jacques Gréber, architect (born 1882)
- 6 June – Yves Klein, artist (born 1928)
- 8 June – Eugène Freyssinet, structural and civil engineer (born 1879)

=== July to September ===
- 1 July – Edgard de Larminat, General (born 1895)
- 8 July – Georges Bataille, writer (born 1897)
- 18 July – Eugene Houdry, mechanical engineer (born 1892)
- 25 July – Paul Aymé, tennis player (born 1869)
- 18 August – Lucien Berland, entomologist and arachnologist (born 1888)
- 19 August – Jean Lucienbonnet, motor racing driver (born 1923)
- 22 August – Charles Rigoulot, weightlifter, professional wrestler, race car driver and actor (born 1903)
- 23 August – Élisée Maclet, painter (born 1881)
- August – Léon Binoche, rugby union player (born 1878)
- 21 September – Princess Marie Bonaparte, psychoanalyst (born 1882)
- 24 September – Félix Goethals, cyclist (born 1891)
- 28 September – Roger Nimier, novelist (born 1925)

=== October to December ===
- 2 October – Madeleine Fournier-Sarlovèze, golfer (born 1873)
- 7 October – Henri Oreiller, alpine skier and Olympic gold medallist (born 1925)
- 14 October – Jacques Majorelle, painter (born 1886)
- 16 October – Gaston Bachelard, philosopher (born 1884)
- 17 October – Natalia Goncharova, Russian-born avant-garde artist (born 1881)
- 30 October – Yvette Andréyor, actress (born 1891)
- 31 October -
  - Gabrielle Renaudot Flammarion, astronomer (born 1877)
  - Louis Massignon, scholar of Islam and its history (born 1883)
- 20 November -
  - Henri Déricourt, pilot and accused double agent (born 1909)
  - Philippe Kieffer, Naval officer (born 1899)
- 22 November – René Coty, politician, President of France (born 1882)
- 26 November – Albert Sarraut, politician, twice Prime Minister of France (born 1872)
- 13 December – Daisy Fellowes, society figure, writer and heiress (born 1890)
- 19 December – Jean-Marie Charles Abrial, admiral and minister (born 1879)

=== Full date unknown ===
- Jacques Maroger, painter (born 1884)

== See also ==
- 1962 in French television
- List of French films of 1962
