= List of Japanese films of 1962 =

A list of films released in Japan in 1962 (see 1962 in film).

== List of films ==
Japanese films released in 1962
Title	Japanese Title	Release date	Director	Cast	Genre	Notes
	檻	1962.__.__	Shūji Terayama			
Sanjuro	椿三十郎	1962.01.01	Akira Kurosawa	Toshirō Mifune, Tatsuya Nakadai, Keiju Kobayashi	Jidai-geki	
Travels of Hibari and Chiemi: The Tumultuous Journey	ひばり・チエミの弥次喜多道中記	1962.01.03	Tadashi Sawashima		Jidai-geki	
	メキシコ無宿	1962.01.03	Koreyoshi Kurahara			
	家庭の事情	1962.01.03	Kōzaburō Yoshimura			
	喜劇 にっぽんのお婆あちゃん	1962.01.03	Tadashi Imai			
	嫉妬	1962.01.03	Michiyoshi Doi			
Days of Young Jirocho: Wild Wind on the Tokaido Highway	若き日の次郎長 東海道のつむじ風	1962.01.03	Masahiro Makino		Jidai-geki	
The Woman and the Three Bad Men	女と三悪人	1962.01.03	Umetsugu Inoue		Jidai-geki	
	千客万来	1962.01.03	Noboru Nakamura			
	大吉ぼんのう鏡	1962.01.03	Katsuhito Inomata			
	北帰行より 渡り鳥北へ帰る	1962.01.03	Buichi Saitō			
Sarariiman Shimizu minato	サラリーマン清水港	1962.01.03	Shue Matsubayashi	Hisaya Morishige, Keiju Kobayashi, Daisuke Katō		
	次郎長社長と石松社員 威風堂々	1962.01.09	Yūsuke Watanabe		Jidai-geki	
	南太平洋波高し	1962.01.09	Kunio Watanabe			
	さよならの季節	1962.01.14	Eisuke Takizawa			
	化身	1962.01.14	Kazuo Mori			
	乾杯！サラリーマン諸君	1962.01.14	Nobuo Aoyagi			
	黒と赤の花びら	1962.01.14	Kichitarō Shibata			
	今年の恋	1962.01.14	Keisuke Kinoshita			
	女の座	1962.01.14	Mikio Naruse			
Good Rascals	大江戸評判記 美男の顔役	1962.01.14	Tadashi Sawashima		Jidai-geki	
	男と男の生きる街	1962.01.14	Toshio Masuda			
	夢でありたい	1962.01.14	Sōkichi Tomimoto			
In Search of Mother	瞼の母	1962.01.14	Tai Katō		Jidai-geki	
Mitasareta seikatsu	充たされた生活	1962.01.14	Susumu Hani			Entered into the 12th Berlin International Film Festival
	ある関係	1962.01.21	Keigo Kimura			
	雁の寺	1962.01.21	Yūzō Kawashima			
Bored Hatamoto: Riddle of the Castle on the Coral Reef	旗本退屈男 謎の珊瑚屋敷	1962.01.23	Nobuo Nakagawa		Jidai-geki	
	新婚シリーズ 月給日は嫌い	1962.01.23	Shigeaki Hidaka			
	人間狩り	1962.01.23	Akinori Matsuo			
	猫が変じて虎になる	1962.01.23	Masahisa Sunohara			
	37年大相撲初場所 前半戦	1962.01.24	Torahiko Ise [composition]			
	喜劇 団地親分	1962.01.25	Hirokazu Ichimura			
	ひとつのいのち	1962.01.27	Kenjirō Morinaga			
	兄貴	1962.01.27	Tokujirō Yamazaki			
	サラリーマン 権三と助十	1962.01.28	Nobuo Aoyagi			
	その場所に女ありて	1962.01.28	Hideo Suzuki			
Case of Umon: Fylfot Spider	右門捕物帖 卍蜘蛛	1962.01.28	Toshikazu Kōno		Jidai-geki	
	寛美の我こそは一等社員	1962.01.29	Chisato Ikoma			
Knightly Advice	天下の御意見番	1962.01.31	Sadatsugu Matsuda		Jidai-geki	
	さすらい	1962.02.03	Hiroshi Noguchi			
	君恋し	1962.02.03	Kenjirō Morinaga			
	37年大相撲初場所 後半戦	1962.02.04	Torahiko Ise [composition]			
	雁ちゃんの警察日記	1962.02.04	Kinya Sakai			
	女は夜霧に濡れている	1962.02.04	Yoshio Inoue			
	酔っぱらい天国	1962.02.04	Minoru Shibuya			
	続新入社員十番勝負 サラリーマン一刀流	1962.02.04	Eiji Iwaki			
	誘拐	1962.02.04	Tokuzō Tanaka			
	べらんめえ芸者と大阪娘	1962.02.07	Kunio Watanabe			
	新婚シリーズ 最初が肝心	1962.02.07	Shigeaki Hidaka			
	銀座の若大将	1962.02.10	Toshio Sugie			
	明日ある限り	1962.02.10	Shirō Toyoda			
	俺が裁くんだ	1962.02.11	Sukune Hashida			
	天使と野郎ども	1962.02.11	Akinori Matsuo			
Hatokuro Hachiman	八幡鳩九郎	1962.02.14	Shōji Matsumura		Jidai-geki	
A Warrior Generation	暴れん坊一代	1962.02.14	Toshikazu Kōno		Jidai-geki	
The Inheritance	からみ合い	1962.02.17	Masaki Kobayashi			
	春の山脈	1962.02.17	Yoshitarō Nomura			
	気まぐれ渡世	1962.02.18	Katsumi Nishikawa			
	事件記者 拳銃貸します	1962.02.18	Tokujirō Yamazaki			
Taka Tenno Hyohyo Ken Yoshino no Fuunji	鷹天皇飄々剣 吉野の風雲児	1962.02.21	Noboru Ono		Jidai-geki	
	鉄砲安の生涯	1962.02.21	Keigo Kimura			
	婦系図	1962.02.21	Kenji Misumi			
	霧の港の赤い花	1962.02.21	Shinji Murayama			
	ある大阪の女	1962.02.24	Eizō Sugawa			
	はぐれ念仏 歓喜まんだら	1962.02.24	Kōzō Saeki			
	機動捜査班 無法地帯	1962.02.25	Isamu Kosugi			
	姿なき追跡者	1962.02.25	Takumi Furukawa			
Flesh Market	肉体の市場	1962.02.27	Satoru Kobayashi	Tamaki Katori	Erotic film	First pink film
Sakura Hangan	さくら判官	1962.02.28	Shigehiro Ozawa		Jidai-geki	
	恋愛学校	1962.02.28	Setsuya Kondō			
	川は流れる	1962.03.03	Hirokazu Ichimura			
	流し雛	1962.03.03	Yoshikazu Ōtsuki			
	銀座の恋の物語	1962.03.04	Koreyoshi Kurahara			
Sandai no Sakazuki	三代の盃	1962.03.04	Kazuo Mori		Jidai-geki	
Ue o Muite Hoko	上を向いて歩こう	1962.03.04	Toshio Masuda		Yakuza	
	情熱の詩人琢木	1962.03.04	Kōji Shima			
Tales of Young Genji Kuro 3	源氏九郎颯爽記 秘剣揚羽の蝶	1962.03.07	Daisuke Itō		Jidai-geki	
	続サラリーマン清水港	1962.03.07	Shūe Matsubayashi			
	愉快な仲間	1962.03.07	Kunio Watanabe			
	旅愁の都	1962.03.07	Hideo Suzuki			
	湖愁	1962.03.11	Tsuneo Tabata			
	男の歌	1962.03.11	Osamu Takahashi			
The Princess and the Mustached Daimyo	お姫様と髭大名	1962.03.14	Eiichi Kudō		Jidai-geki	
	黒蜥蝪	1962.03.14	Umetsugu Inoue			
	二・二六事件 脱出	1962.03.14	Tsuneo Kobayashi			
	爛	1962.03.14	Yasuzō Masumura			
	この日美わし	1962.03.18	Mitsuo Yagi			
	闇に消えた使者	1962.03.18	Ryōichi Yamanouchi			
	私たちの結婚	1962.03.18	Masahiro Shinoda			
	抜き射ち風来坊	1962.03.18	Isamu Kosugi			
	紅の空	1962.03.21	Senkichi Taniguchi			
The Christian Revolt	天草四郎時貞	1962.03.21	Nagisa Ōshima		Jidai-geki	
For Love, the Sun, and the Gang	恋と太陽とギャング	1962.03.21	Teruo Ishii		Yakuza	
Gorath	妖星ゴラス	1962.03.21	Ishirō Honda	Ryō Ikebe, Yumi Shirakawa, Takashi Shimura	Science fiction	
	スーダラ節 わかっちゃいるけどやめられねぇ	1962.03.25	Tarō Yuge			
	花の才月	1962.03.25	Yoshitsugu Nakajima			
	江梨子	1962.03.25	Keigo Kimura			
	黒いダイス	1962.03.25	Yōichi Ushihara			
Princess Sen and Hideyori	千姫と秀頼	1962.03.25	Masahiro Makino		Jidai-geki	
	未来につながる子ら	1962.03.25	Sotoji Kimura			
	誇り高き挑戦	1962.03.28	Kinji Fukasaku			
	37年大相撲春場所 大鵬の五連覇に挑む熱戦譜	1962.04.01	Torahiko Ise [composition]			
	皇太子ご夫妻のアジア旅行	1962.04.01				
	愛染かつら	1962.04.01	Noboru Nakamura			
	事件記者 影なき侵入者	1962.04.01	Tokujirō Yamazaki			
	女難コースを突破せよ	1962.04.01	Masanori Kakei			
	太陽先生青春記	1962.04.01	Kunio Matoi			
	夢がいっぱい暴れん坊	1962.04.01	Akinori Matsuo			
	娘と私	1962.04.01	Hiromichi Horikawa			
	黄門社長漫遊記	1962.04.04	Eiichi Koishi			
	若者たちの夜と昼	1962.04.04	Miyoji Ieki			
	雪の降る街に	1962.04.04	Tetsutarō Murano			
	裁かれる越前守	1962.04.06	Tokuzō Tanaka		Jidai-geki	
	破戒	1962.04.06	Kon Ichikawa			
	太平洋戦争と姫ゆり部隊	1962.04.07	Kiyoshi Komori			
The Kisaragi Sword	きさらぎ無双剣	1962.04.08	Yasushi Sasaki		Jidai-geki	
	青年の椅子	1962.04.08	Katsumi Nishikawa			
Foundry Town	キューポラのある街	1962.04.08	Kiriro Urayama	Sayuri Yoshinaga		Entered into the 1962 Cannes Film Festival; Won the Blue Ribbon Awards in 1962.
The Hawk of Edo	大江戸の鷹	1962.04.11	Kōkichi Uchide		Jidai-geki	
	クレージーの花嫁と七人の仲間	1962.04.15	Yoshiaki Banshō			
	雲の上団五郎一座	1962.04.15	Nobuo Aoyagi			
	如何なる星の下に	1962.04.15	Shirō Toyoda			
Tange Sazen: Legend of Kenun and Unkon	丹下左膳 乾雲坤竜の巻	1962.04.17	Tai Katō		Jidai-geki	
Kabe no Nakano Bijo	壁の中の美女	1962.04.17	Hideaki Ōnishi		Jidai-geki	
	しのび逢い	1962.04.18	Tatsuo Sakai			
	何もかも狂ってやがる	1962.04.18	Mitsuo Wakasugi			
	閉店時間	1962.04.18	Umetsugu Inoue			
The Tale of Zatoichi	座頭市物語	1962.04.18	Kenji Misumi	Shintaro Katsu, Masayo Banri, Shigeru Amachi	Jidai-geki / Chambara	
	鉄ものがたり	1962.04.22	Hajime Maeda			
	週末屋繁晶記	1962.04.22	Motomu Ida			
	太平洋のGメン	1962.04.22	Teruo Ishii			
	大氷原	1962.04.22	Buichi Saitō			
Muko Mizu no Kenka Gasa	向う見ずの喧嘩笠	1962.04.24	Daisuke Yamazaki		Jidai-geki	
	B・G物語 易入門	1962.04.29	Sōkichi Tomimoto			
	どぶろくの辰	1962.04.29	Hiroshi Inagaki			
	京子の初恋 八十八夜の月	1962.04.29	Hirokazu Ichimura			
	山河あり	1962.04.29	Zenzō Matsuyama			
	社長洋行記	1962.04.29	Toshio Sugie			
The Princess and I	熱砂の月	1962.04.29	Shigeo Tanaka			Japanese-Filipino co-production
	不完全結婚	1962.05.01	Satoru Kobayashi, Kenta Kimoto			
	雲に向かって起つ	1962.05.01	Eisuke Takizawa			
Gekiryu ni Ikiru Otoko	激流に生きる男	1962.05.01	Takashi Nomura		Yakuza	
	民謡の旅・桜島 おてもやん	1962.05.01	Kunio Watanabe			
Love, Thy Name Be Sorrow	恋や恋なすな恋	1962.05.01	Tomu Uchida		Jidai-geki	
Abekobe Dochu	あべこべ道中	1962.05.09	Toshikazu Kōno		Jidai-geki	
	若い爪あと	1962.05.09	Yoshitsugu Nakajima			
	純愛物語 草の実	1962.05.09	Shinji Murayama			
	サラリーマンどんと節 気楽な稼業と来たもんだ	1962.05.12	Hiromu Edagawa			
	仲よし音頭 日本一だよ	1962.05.12	Yoshio Inoue			
	ブルータウン 青い街の狼	1962.05.13	Takumi Furukawa			
	太陽のように明るく	1962.05.13	Kenjirō Morinaga			
	大笑い次郎長一家 三ン下二挺拳銃	1962.05.15	Torajirō Saitō			
	吼えろ脱獄囚	1962.05.15	Jun Fukuda			
Minamoto no Kuro Yoshitsune	源九郎義経	1962.05.16	Sadatsugu Matsuda		Jidai-geki	
	松本清張のスリラー 考える葉	1962.05.16	Hajime Satō			
	37年大相撲夏場所 前半戦	1962.05.20	Torahiko Ise [composition]			
	あの空の果てに星はまたゝく	1962.05.20	Hideo Sekikawa			
	機動捜査班 東京午前零時	1962.05.20	Isamu Kosugi			
	借別の歌	1962.05.20	Hiroshi Noguchi			
	愛のうず潮	1962.05.22	Seiji Hisamatsu			
	女性自身	1962.05.22	Jun Fukuda			
Cases of Denshichi: The Shadowless Man	伝七捕物帖 影のない男	1962.05.23	Kinnosuke Fukada		Jidai-geki	
	37年大相撲夏場所 後半戦	1962.05.27	Torahiko Ise [composition]			
Sōran Wataridori	ソーラン渡り鳥	1962.05.27	Bin Kato		Jidai-geki	
	のこされた子とのこした母と	1962.05.27	Masateru Nishiyama			
The Flower and the Bandits	花と野盗の群れ	1962.05.27	Shigehiro Ozawa		Jidai-geki	
	左ききの狙撃者 東京湾	1962.05.27	Yoshitarō Nomura			
	残酷な月	1962.05.27	Masuichi Iizuka			
	若者に夢あり	1962.05.27	Akinori Matsuo			
In a Ring of Mountains	中山七里	1962.05.27	Kazuo Ikehiro		Jidai-geki	
	霧子の運命	1962.05.27	Yoshirō Kawazu			
	雨の九段坂	1962.05.30	Kimiyoshi Yasuda			
	どぶ鼠作戦	1962.06.01	Kihachi Okamoto			
	続社長洋行記	1962.06.01	Toshio Sugie			
Lady Ogin	お吟さま	1962.06.03	Kinuyo Tanaka		Jidai-geki	
	サラリーマン一心太助	1962.06.03	Tadashi Sawashima			
	背くれべ	1962.06.03	Yoshikazu Ōtsuki			
	抜き射ち三四郎	1962.06.03	Tokujirō Yamazaki			
	悲しみはいつも母に	1962.06.03	Nobuo Nakagawa			
	目をつぶって突っ走れ	1962.06.03	Kiyoshi Horiike			
New Bad Reputation	新悪名	1962.06.03	Kazuo Mori		Yakuza	
	赤い蕾と白い花	1962.06.10	Katsumi Nishikawa			
	二階堂卓也銀座無頼帖 帰ってきた旋風児	1962.06.10	Hiroshi Noguchi			
A Carpenter and Children	ちいさこべ 第一部	1962.06.10	Tomotaka Tasaka		Jidai-geki	
	ちいさこべ 第二部	1962.06.10	Tomotaka Tasaka		Jidai-geki	
	沖縄怪談逆吊り幽霊 支那怪談死棺破り	1962.06.13	Satoru Kobayashi, Lo-Hui Shao			
	おったまげ人魚姫	1962.06.15	Manao Horiuchi			
	秋津温泉	1962.06.15	Yoshishige Yoshida			
	アラビアンナイト シンドバッドの冒険	1962.06.16	Taiji Yabushita, Masao Kurobe			
	やっちゃ場の女	1962.06.17	Keigo Kimura			
Gion Assassin	祇園の暗殺者	1962.06.17	Kōkichi Uchide		Jidai-geki	
	東京オリンピック序曲	1962.06.20				
	おへその大将	1962.06.20	Kōzō Saeki			
Teen Yakuza	ハイティーンやくざ	1962.06.20	Seijun Suzuki		Yakuza	
	豚と金魚	1962.06.20	Tetsuhiro Kawasaki			
	ひとり旅	1962.06.24	Buichi Saitō			
	雲右ヱ門とその妻	1962.06.24	Kimiyoshi Yasuda			
	英語に弱い男 東は東、西は西	1962.06.24	Masahisa Sunohara			
Ghost Story of Stone Lanterns and Crying in the Night	怪談夜泣き燈籠	1962.06.24	Katsuhiko Tasaka		Jidai-geki	
	警視庁物語 謎の赤電話	1962.06.24	Shōichi Shimazu			
Otoko Dokyo no Ayame Gasa	男度胸のあやめ笠	1962.06.24	Yasushi Sasaki		Jidai-geki	
	青べか物語	1962.06.28	Yūzō Kawashima			
	夜の傾斜	1962.06.28	Seiichirō Uchikawa			
	あの橋の畔で	1962.07.01	Yoshitarō Nomura			
	九ちゃん音頭	1962.07.01	Hirokazu Ichimura			
Kocho Kagero Ken	胡蝶かげろう剣	1962.07.01	Eiichi Kudō		Jidai-geki	
	黒の試走車	1962.07.01	Yasuzō Masumura			
	山麓	1962.07.01	Masaharu Segawa			
Destiny's Son	斬る	1962.07.01	Kenji Misumi		Jidai-geki	
	太陽と星	1962.07.01	Yōichi Ushihara			
Pitfall	おとし穴	1962.07.01	Hiroshi Teshigahara	Hisashi Igawa		
	高校生と女教師 非情の青春	1962.07.07	Hideo Onchi			
	重役候補生No．1	1962.07.07	Kengo Furusawa			
	すてきな16才	1962.07.08	Hisashi Terajima			
Bajo no Wakamusha	よか稚児ざくら 馬上の若武者	1962.07.08	Toshikazu Kōno		Jidai-geki	
	歌う明星 青春がいっぱい	1962.07.08	Eiichi Koishi			
	山男の歌	1962.07.08	Mitsuo Murayama			
	憎いあンちくしょう	1962.07.08	Koreyoshi Kurahara			
Kiri no Yoru no Otoko	霧の夜の男	1962.07.08	Akinori Matsuo		Yakuza	
Gang vs Gang	ギャング対ギャング	1962.07.13	Teruo Ishii		Yakuza	
Yakuza Official	橋蔵のやくざ判官	1962.07.13	Masahiro Makino		Jidai-geki	
	香港の星 STAR OF HONGKONG	1962.07.14	Yasuki Chiba			
	日本一の若大将	1962.07.14	Jun Fukuda			
	37年大相撲名古屋場所 五大関柏鵬に挑む	1962.07.15	Torahiko Ise [composition]			
	鯨神	1962.07.15	Tokuzō Tanaka			
	悲恋の若武者	1962.07.15	Masateru Nishiyama			
	遙かなる国の歌	1962.07.15	Takashi Nomura			
	三人娘乾杯！	1962.07.18	Yoshiaki Banshō			
	機動捜査班 港の掠奪者	1962.07.25	Isamu Kosugi			
	愛と悲しみと	1962.07.29	Hideo Ōba			
Case of Umon:	右門捕物帖 紅蜥蝪	1962.07.29	Sadatsugu Matsuda		Jidai-geki	
	警視庁物語 19号埋立地	1962.07.29	Shōichi Shimazu			
170 Leagues to Edo	江戸へ百七十里	1962.07.29	Kazuo Mori		Jidai-geki	
	山の讃歌 燃ゆる若者たち	1962.07.29	Masahiro Shinoda			
	燃える南十字星	1962.07.29	Buichi Saitō			
	宝石泥棒	1962.07.29	Umetsugu Inoue			
Kigeki Ekimae onsen	喜劇 駅前温泉	1962.07.29	Seiji Hisamatsu	Hisaya Morishige, Frankie Sakai, Junzaburo Ban	Comedy	
Nippon musekinin jidai	ニッポン無責任時代	1962.07.29	Kengo Furusawa	Hitoshi Ueki, Hajime Hana, Kei tani		
Kaidan Shamisen Hori	怪談三味線掘	1962.08.04	Kōkichi Uchide		Jidai-geki	
The Sentencer	地獄の裁きは俺がする	1962.08.04	Yasushi Sasaki			
	星の瞳をもつ男	1962.08.05	Katsumi Nishikawa			
	晴子の応援団長	1962.08.05	Kinya Sakai			
	日本の夜	1962.08.08	Keizō Ōno			
	泣くんじゃないぜ	1962.08.08	Kenjirō Morinaga			
King Kong vs. Godzilla	キングコング対ゴジラ	1962.08.11	Ishirō Honda	Tadao Takashima, Mie Hama, Kenji Sahara	Kaiju eiga	
Watashi to watashi	私と私	1962.08.11	Toshio Sugie	The Peanuts, Akira Takarada, Hajime Hana	Musical comedy	
	かっこいい若者たち	1962.08.12	Tarō Yuge			
	ひばりの母恋ギター	1962.08.12	Kiyoshi Saeki			
The Phantom Goblin	まぼろし天狗	1962.08.12	Nobuo Nakagawa		Jidai-geki	
	求人旅行	1962.08.12	Noboru Nakamura			
Long Swords of the Loyal 47	長脇差忠臣蔵	1962.08.12	Kunio Watanabe		Jidai-geki	
	渡り鳥故郷へ帰る	1962.08.12	Yōichi Ushihara			
	二人で歩いた幾春秋	1962.08.12	Keisuke Kinoshita			
	零戦黒雲一家	1962.08.12	Toshio Masuda			
	真昼の罠	1962.08.19	Sōkichi Tomimoto			
Full House at Eight Province Checkpoint	勢揃い関八州	1962.08.22	Yasushi Sasaki		Jidai-geki	
	八月十五日の動乱	1962.08.22	Tsuneo Kobayashi			
Touring the World	おとぎの世界旅行	1962.08.25	Ryuichi Yokoyama		Anime	
	当りや大将	1962.08.26	Kō Nakahira			
	僕チン放浪記	1962.08.26	Yoshikazu Ōtsuki			
	サラリーマン物語 新入社員第一課	1962.08.26	Motomu Ida			
	東京丸の内	1962.08.29	Michio Konishi			
	かあちゃん結婚しろよ	1962.09.01	Heinosuke Gosho			
	学生芸者 恋と喧嘩	1962.09.01	Hirokazu Ichimura			
The Warrior from Kishu	紀州の暴れん坊	1962.09.01	Nobuo Nakagawa		Jidai-geki	
Drunken Sword	酔いどれ無双剣	1962.09.01	Tadashi Sawashima		Jidai-geki	
The Devil of Aoba Castle	青葉城の鬼	1962.09.01	Kenji Misumi		Jidai-geki	
	男と女の世の中	1962.09.01	Kōji Shima			
	僕たちの失敗	1962.09.01	Eizō Sugawa			
	銃弾の嵐	1962.09.02	Takumi Furukawa			
	早乙女家の娘たち	1962.09.08	Seiji Hisamatsu			
	あすの花嫁	1962.09.09	Takashi Nomura			
	義士始末記	1962.09.09	Tatsuo Ōsone			
	三百六十五夜	1962.09.09	Kunio Watanabe			
	若くて、悪くて、凄いこいつら	1962.09.09	Kō Nakahira			
	太陽の子 アイ・ジョージ物語	1962.09.09	Setsuya Kondō			
	箱根山	1962.09.15	Yūzō Kawashima			
	夢であいましょ	1962.09.15	Kōzō Saeki			
	あした逢う人	1962.09.16	Yoshio Inoue			
	こまどり姉妹 おけさ渡り鳥	1962.09.16	Masamitsu Igayama			
Ken ni Kakeru	剣に賭ける	1962.09.16	Tokuzō Tanaka		Jidai-geki	
	東京さのさ娘	1962.09.16	Kinya Sakai			
Yagyu Chronicles 4: One-Eyed Swordsman	柳生武芸帳 独眼一刀流	1962.09.16	Shōji Matsumura		Jidai-geki / Ninja	
Harakiri	切腹	1962.09.16	Masaki Kobayashi	Tatsuya Nakadai, Shima Iwashita, Akira Ishihama	Jidai-geki	
	37年大相撲秋場所 前半戦	1962.09.19	Torahiko Ise [composition]			
	横を向いた青春	1962.09.19	Yoshitsugu Nakajima			
	がんこ親父と江戸っ子社員	1962.09.22	Yūsuke Watanabe			
	機動捜査班 東京暴力地図	1962.09.22	Isamu Kosugi			
A Revengeful Raid	次郎長と小天狗 殴り込み甲州路	1962.09.22	Masahiro Makino		Jidai-geki	
	地獄の夜は真紅だぜ	1962.09.22	Hiroshi Noguchi			
	新・狐と狸	1962.09.29	Shūe Matsubayashi			
A Wanderer's Notebook	放浪記	1962.09.29	Mikio Naruse	Hideko Takamine, Akira Takarada	Drama	
	37年大相撲秋場所 後半戦	1962.09.30	Torahiko Ise [composition]			
	あの橋の畔で 第2部	1962.09.30	Yoshitarō Nomura			
	サラリーマン物語 敵は幾万ありとても	1962.09.30	Ren Yoshimura			
	その夜は忘れない	1962.09.30	Kōzaburō Yoshimura			
Echigo Lion Festival	越後獅子祭り	1962.09.30	Shigehiro Ozawa		Jidai-geki	
Fencing Master	殺陣師段平	1962.09.30	Shunkai Mizuho			
	硝子のジョニー 野獣のように見えて	1962.09.30	Koreyoshi Kurahara			
Tekka Wakashu	鉄火若衆	1962.09.30	Yasushi Sasaki		Jidai-geki	
Tears on the Lion's Mane	涙を、獅子のたて髪に	1962.09.30	Masahiro Shinoda			
	ひばりの佐渡情話	1962.10.06	Kunio Watanabe			
	激しい河	1962.10.06	Yōichi Ushihara			
	若い人	1962.10.06	Katsumi Nishikawa			
	狙い射ち無頼漢	1962.10.06	Shōichi Shimazu			
	乳房を抱く娘たち	1962.10.07	Satsuo Yamamoto			
Last Days of the Underworld	暗黒街最後の日	1962.10.12	Umetsugu Inoue		Yakuza	
Mark of Blood	血煙り笠	1962.10.12	Sadatsugu Matsuda		Jidai-geki	
The Tale of Zatoichi Continues	続・座頭市物語	1962.10.12	Issei Mori	Shintaro Katsu, Yoshie Mitzutani, Masaayo Mari	Jidai-geki / Chambara	
	かあちゃん長生きしてね	1962.10.13	Yoshirō Kawazu			
	地方記者	1962.10.13	Seiji Maruyama			
	車掌物語 旅は道づれ	1962.10.19	Masahisa Sunohara			
	やま猫作戦	1962.10.20	Senkichi Taniguchi			
	御身	1962.10.20	Kōji Shima			
	瘋癲老人日記	1962.10.20	Keigo Kimura			
Wakai kisetsu	若い季節	1962.10.20	Kengo Furusawa	Kenji Awaji, Tatsuo Matsumura, Akihiko Hirata	Musical comedy	
	世界に道がある限り	1962.10.21	Masuichi Iizuka			
	拳銃は淋しい男の歌さ	1962.10.21	Tokujirō Yamazaki			
	東京アンタッチャブル	1962.10.21	Shinji Murayama			
	望郷の海	1962.10.21	Takumi Furukawa			
Dokuro-Sen	髑髏銭	1962.10.21	Kōkichi Uchide		Jidai-geki	
	はだしの花嫁	1962.10.24	Yoshiaki Banshō			
	続・愛染かつら	1962.10.24	Noboru Nakamura			
While Traveling	ひばりの花笠道中	1962.10.27	Toshikazu Kōno		Jidai-geki	
Duel at Inazuma Pass	稲妻峠の決闘	1962.10.27	Nobuo Nakagawa		Jidai-geki	
	若い旋風	1962.10.31	Kiyoshi Horiike			
Shin Shikotei	秦・始皇帝	1962.11.01	Shigeo Tanaka		Jidai-geki	
	肉体自由貿易	1962.11.__	Sōjirō Motoki			
Tengu Priest	お坊主天狗	1962.11.02	Yasushi Sasaki		Jidai-geki	
Gang vs G-Men	ギャング対Gメン	1962.11.02	Kinji Fukasaku		Yakuza	
	ひとりぼっちの二人だが	1962.11.03	Toshio Masuda			
	金門島にかける橋	1962.11.03	Akinori Matsuo			
New Bad Reputation Continues	続・新悪名	1962.11.03	Tokuzō Tanaka		Yakuza	
The Assassin From Hell	地獄の刺客	1962.11.03	Kazuo Ikehiro		Jidai-geki	
Chushingura	忠臣蔵 花の巻 雪の巻	1962.11.03	Hiroshi Inagaki	Koshiro Matsumoto, Yūzō Kayama, Tatsuya Mihashi	Jidai-geki	
Kurobe Gorge Part III	大いなる黒部	1962.11.03	Tetsu Yamazoe		Documentary	
	人間	1962.11.04	Kaneto Shindō			
	ある街角の物語	1962.11.05	Eiichi Yamamoto, Yūsaku Sakamoto			
	おす（雄）	1962.11.05	Eiichi Yamamoto			
	裸体	1962.11.08	Masashige Narusawa			
Mansion of the Blood Curse	血文字屋敷	1962.11.11	Eiichi Kudō		Jidai-geki	
Shadow of Hell	地獄の影法師	1962.11.11	Junji Kurata		Jidai-geki / Ninja	
	ポンコツおやじ	1962.11.14	Masahisa Sunohara			
Miyamoto Musashi II: Duel at Hannyazaka Hillside	宮本武蔵 般若坂の決斗	1962.11.17	Tomu Uchida		Jidai-geki	
	若ざくら喧嘩纏	1962.11.17	Kinnosuke Fukada		Jidai-geki	
Sarariiman Gonzo to Sukeiju-Renai kosaten	サラリーマン権三と助十 恋愛交叉点	1962.11.17	Nobuo Aoyagi	Tadao Takashima, Yumi Shirakawa, Yu Fujiki	Comedy	
	あいつばかりが何故もてる	1962.11.18	Kinya Sakai			
	女の一生	1962.11.18	Yasuzō Masumura			
An Autumn Afternoon	秋刀魚の味	1962.11.18	Yasujirō Ozu	Chishū Ryū, Shima Iwashita, Shinichiro Mikami	Drama	
Being Two Isn't Easy	私は二歳	1962.11.18	Kon Ichikawa	Hiro Suzuki, Eiji Funakoshi, Fujiko Urabe		
	しろばんば	1962.11.21	Eisuke Takizawa			
	愛と死のかたみ	1962.11.21	Buichi Saitō			
	若いふたり	1962.11.21	Kiyoshi Horiike			
	カレーライス	1962.11.23	Yūsuke Watanabe			
	王将	1962.11.23	Daisuke Itō			
Born in Sin	河のほとりで	1962.11.23	Yasuki Chiba	Yūzō Kayama, Yuriko Hoshi, Mitsuko Kusabue		
My Hobo	ぶらりぶらぶら物語	1962.11.23	Zenzo Matsuyama	Keiju Kobayashi, Hideko Takamine, Reiko Dan		
	十代の河	1962.11.28	Kenjirō Morinaga			
	37年大相撲九州場所 新鋭・柏鵬の堅塁に迫る	1962.12.01	Torahiko Ise [composition]			
The Paper Crane	花の折鶴笠	1962.12.01	Toshikazu Kōno		Jidai-geki	
	危いことなら銭になる	1962.12.01	Kō Nakahira			
	機動捜査班 群狼の街	1962.12.01	Isamu Kosugi			
	江戸っ子長屋	1962.12.01	Hideaki Ōnishi		Jidai-geki	
Shinobi no Mono	忍びの者	1962.12.01	Satsuo Yamamoto		Jidai-geki / Ninja	
Fūjin Raijin	風神雷神	1962.12.01	Mitsuo Murayama			
	海猫が飛んで	1962.12.05	Tatsuo Sakai			
	大学かぞえうた 先輩・後輩	1962.12.05	Mitsuo Yagi			
Anything for Success	月給泥棒	1962.12.08	Kihachi Okamoto	Akira Takarada, Yoko Tsukasa, Chisako Hara		
The Weed of Crime	暗黒街の牙	1962.12.08	Jun Fukuda	Tatsuya Mihashi, Yosuke Natsuki, Mie Hama	Yakuza / Thriller	
Festival Song	唄祭り赤城山	1962.12.09	Kinnosuke Fukada		Jidai-geki	
Yumingai no Judan	遊民街の銃弾	1962.12.09	Masuichi Iizuka			
Those Who Bet On Me	俺に賭けた奴ら	1962.12.12	Seijun Suzuki			
	殺人者を追え	1962.12.12	Masuo Maeda			
	禁断	1962.12.15	Yoshio Inoue			
Yokina Tono-Sama	陽気な殿様	1962.12.15	Kazuo Mori		Jidai-geki	
	皇太子ご夫妻の比国ご訪問	1962.12.16				
	危険な商売 鉛をぶちこめ	1962.12.16	Buichi Saitō			
	恐怖の魔女	1962.12.16	Eijirō Wakabayashi			
	惚れたって駄目よ	1962.12.16	Motomu Ida			
Ridgetop Duel	薩陀峠の対決	1962.12.16	Daisuke Yamazaki		Jidai-geki	
	風流温泉 番頭日記	1962.12.16	Nobuo Aoyagi			
	泣いて笑った花嫁	1962.12.19	Yoshiaki Banshō			
	空と海の結婚	1962.12.19	Osamu Takahashi			
	ニッポン無責任野郎	1962.12.23	Kengo Furusawa			
	喜劇 駅前飯店	1962.12.23	Seiji Hisamatsu			
Case of Young Lord 10	若さま侍捕物帳 お化粧蜘蛛	1962.12.23	Sadatsugu Matsuda, Shōji Matsumura		Jidai-geki	
Uragirimono Wa Jigoku Daze	裏切者は地獄だぜ	1962.12.23	Shigehiro Ozawa			
	しとやかな獣	1962.12.26	Yūzō Kawashima			
	やくざの勲章	1962.12.26	Umetsugu Inoue		Yakuza	
	歌う暴れん坊	1962.12.26	Akinori Matsuo			
Flower and Dragon	花と竜	1962.12.26	Toshio Masuda		Yakuza	
	団地夫人	1962.12.26	Hiromu Edagawa			
	抜打ち鴉	1962.12.26	Bin Kato			
	ちんじゃらじゃら物語	1962.12.30	Manao Horiuchi			
	バラキンと九ちゃん 申し訳ない野郎たち	1962.12.30	Hirokazu Ichimura			

== See also ==
- 1962 in Japan
