= 1962 in French television =

This is a list of French television related events from 1962.

== Events ==
- 18 March – France wins the 7th Eurovision Song Contest in Luxembourg, Luxembourg. The winning song is "Un premier amour" performed by Isabelle Aubret.

== Debuts ==
December 10 – Bonne nuit les petits

== Television shows ==
=== 1940s ===
- Le Jour du Seigneur (1949–present)

=== 1950s ===
- Art et magie de la cuisine
- Cinq colonnes à la une
- Discorama
- Magazine féminin (1952–1970)
- Lectures pour tous (1953–1968)
- La Piste aux étoiles (1956–1978)

=== 1960s ===
- Chambre noire
- La Tête et les Jambes (1960–1978)
- Les Coulisses de l'exploit (1961–1972)
- Télé-Philatélie
- Voyage sans passeport (1957–1969)

== Ending this year ==
- Faire face – February 10 1962

== Births ==
- 30 November – Gérard Vivès, actor, humorist & TV presenter

== See also ==
- 1962 in France
- List of French films of 1962
