= Jouannet =

Jouannet is a surname. Notable people with the surname include:

- Andrés Jouannet, Chilean teacher and politician
- Chloé Jouannet (born 1997), French actress
- Emmanuelle Jouannet, French professor of Law
- Thomas Jouannet, Swiss actor
