= List of Soviet films of 1962 =

A list of films produced in the Soviet Union in 1962 (see 1962 in film).

== 1962 ==
Title	Russian title	Director	Cast	Genre	Notes
1962
713 Requests Permission to Land	713-й просит посадку	Grigory Nikulin	Vladimir Chestnokov, Otar Koberidze, Yefim Kopelyan	Disaster film	
After the Wedding	После свадьбы	Mikhail Yershov	Stanislav Khitrov	Drama	
At Your Threshold	У твоего порога	Vasili Ordynsky	Nadezhda Fedosova	War drama	
A Trip Without a Load	Порожний рейс	Vladimir Vengerov	Georgi Yumatov, Aleksandr Demyanenko, Tamara Syomina	Drama	Entered into the 3rd Moscow International Film Festival
Amphibian Man	Человек-амфибия	Vladimir Chebotaryov, Gennadi Kazansky	Vladimir Korenev, Anastasiya Vertinskaya, Mikhail Kozakov	Sci-fi	
Black Gull	Черная чайка	Grigoriy Koltunov	Anatoliy Adoskin	Adventure	
Cherry Town	Черёмушки	Herbert Rappaport	Olga Zabotkina	Musical	
Colleagues	Коллеги	Aleksey Sakharov	Vasily Livanov	Drama	
Dangerous Curves	Опасные повороты	Juli Kun, Kaljo Kiisk	Terje Luik	Comedy	Panorama movie
Flower on the Stone	Цветок на камне	Anatoly Slesarenko, Sergei Parajanov	Inna Burduchenko, Anatoly Motornyi	Drama	
Funny Stories	Весёлые истории	Venyamin Dorman	Mikhail Kislyarov	Comedy	
Hello, Children!	Здравствуйте, дети!	Mark Donskoy	Aleksei Zharkov	Drama	
Hussar Ballad	Гусарская баллада	Eldar Ryazanov	Larisa Golubkina, Yury Yakovlev, Igor Ilyinsky, Tatyana Shmyga	Musical, comedy	
Ivan's Childhood	Иваново детство	Andrei Tarkovsky	Nikolai Burlyaev, Valentin Zubkov, Evgeny Zharikov, Stepan Krylov	Drama	
The Knight Move	Ход конем	Tatyana Lukashevich	Boris Kuznetsov, Savely Kramarov, Afanasy Kochetkov	Comedy	
Men and Beasts	Люди и звери	Sergei Gerasimov	Nikolai Yeremenko Sr.	Drama	
Me, Grandma, Iliko and Ilarion	Я, бабушка, Илико и Илларион	Tengiz Abuladze	Soso Ordjonikidze, Sesilia Takaishvili, Aleqsandre Jorjoliani	Comedy, drama	
My Younger Brother	Мой младший брат	Aleksandr Zarkhi	Lyudmila Marchenko, Alexander Zbruev, Oleg Dal, Andrei Mironov, Oleg Yefremov	Drama	
Nevermore	Никогда	Vladimir Dyachenko, Pyotr Todorovsky	Yevgeniy Yevstigneyev	Drama	
Nine Days in One Year	Девять дней одного года	Mikhail Romm	Aleksey Batalov, Innokenty Smoktunovsky, Yevgeniy Yevstigneyev	Drama	
No Fear, No Blame	Без страха и упрека	Aleksandr Mitta	Alla Vitruk	Drama	
Planeta Bur	Планета Бурь	Pavel Klushantsev	Vladimir Yemelyanov, Georgiy Zhzhonov, Gennadi Vernov	Science fiction	
The Road to Berth	Путь к причалу	Georgiy Daneliya	Boris Andreyev	Drama	
Seven Nannies	Семь нянек	Rolan Bykov	Semyon Morozov	Comedy	
Seven Winds	На семи ветрах	Stanislav Rostotsky	Larisa Luzhina	Drama	
Shore Leave	Увольнение на берег	Feliks Mironer	Ariadna Shengelaya	Drama	
Sixteenth Spring	Шестнадцатая весна	Yaropolk Lapshin	Vladimir Gogolinski, Roza Makagonova		
Strictly Business	Деловые люди	Leonid Gaidai	Vladlen Paulus, Rostislav Plyatt, Yuri Nikulin, Georgy Vitsin	Comedy	
The Third Half	Третий тайм	Yevgeny Karelov	Leonid Kuravlyov	Drama	
We, Two Men	Мы, двое мужчин	Yury Lysenko			
The Wild Dog Dingo	Дикая собака Динго	Yuli Karasik	Galina Polskikh	Drama	
The Wild Swans	Дикие лебеди	Mikhail Tsekhanovsky		Animation	

== See also ==
- 1962 in the Soviet Union
