= List of French films of 1962 =

A list of films produced in France in 1962.

Title	Director	Cast	Genre	Notes
Adorable Liar	Michel Deville	Marina Vlady, Macha Méril, Michel Vitold	Comedy, romance	
Arsene Lupin vs. Arsene Lupin	Édouard Molinaro	Jean-Claude Brialy, Jean-Pierre Cassel	Comedy, crime	French-Italian co-production
Assassin in the Phonebook	Léo Joannon	Fernandel, Georges Chamarat, Henri Crémieux, Robert Dalban, Marie Déa	Comedy	
The Awful Dr. Orloff	Jesús Franco	Perla Cristal, Howard Vernon, Diana Lorys	Horror	Spanish–French co-production
Boccaccio '70	Vittorio De Sica, Federico Fellini, Mario Monicelli, Luchino Visconti	Romy Schneider, Sophia Loren, Anita Ekberg	Comedy, fantasy	Italian-French co-production
Cartouche	Philippe de Broca	Jean-Paul Belmondo, Claudia Cardinale, Jean Rochefort	Adventure	French-Italian co-production
Clash of Steel	Bernard Borderie	Gérard Barray, Gianna Maria Canale, Michèle Grellier	Adventure	Co-production with Italy
Cléo from 5 to 7	Agnès Varda	Corinne Marchand, Antoine Bourseiller, Dominique Davray	Drama	French–Italian co-production
Douce violence	Max Pécas	Elke Sommer, Pierre Brice, Christian Pezy	Drama	
Eclipse	Michelangelo Antonioni	Monica Vitti, Alain Delon, Lilla Brignone	Drama	Italian-French co-production
The Elusive Corporal	Jean Renoir	Jean-Pierre Cassel, Claude Brasseur, Claude Rich	Comedy-drama	
The Empire of Night	Pierre Grimblat	Eddie Constantine, Geneviève Grad, Harold Nicholas, Guy Bedos, Roger Carel, Claude Cerval, Jean Galland	Spy	
The Eye of Evil	Claude Chabrol	Jacques Charrier, Stéphane Audran, Walther Reyer	Drama	French–Italian co-production
The Fabiani Affair	André Versini	Charles Aznavour, Raymond Pellegrin, Giovanna Ralli	Crime	Co-production with Italy
The Gentleman from Epsom	Gilles Grangier	Jean Gabin, Madeleine Robinson, Frank Villard	Comedy	Co-production with Italy
Give Me Ten Desperate Men	Pierre Zimmer	Pascale Audret, Jacques Riberolles, Maurice Sarfati	Drama	French–Israeli production
Good Luck, Charlie	Jean-Louis Richard	Eddie Constantine, Albert Préjean, Carla Marlier	Thriller	
How to Succeed in Love	Michel Boisrond	Dany Saval, Jean Poiret, Jacqueline Maillan	Comedy	Co-production with Italy
Jules and Jim	François Truffaut	Jeanne Moreau, Oskar Werner, Henri Serre	Drama, romance	
Konga Yo	Yves Allégret	Nicole Courcel, Jean Lefebvre, Nicole Courcel, Roger Pigaut	Drama	
La Jetée	Chris Marker	Jean Négroni, Jacques Ledoux, Hélène Châtelain	Avant-garde, science fiction	
La loi des hommes	Charles Gérard	Micheline Presle, Philippe Leroy, Pierre Mondy, Arletty, Marcel Dalio	Crime	
La Poupée	Jacques Baratier	Zbigniew Cybulski, Sonne Teal, László Szabó	Science fiction	French-Italian co-production
Le Combat dans l'île	Alain Cavalier	Romy Schneider, Jean-Louis Trintignant	Drama, Thriller	
Le Crime ne paie pas	Gérard Oury	Pierre Brasseur, Edwige Feuillère, Gabriele Ferzetti	Crime, historical film	French-Italian co-production
Le Doulos	Jean-Pierre Melville	Belmondo, Serge Reggiani, Monique Hennessy	Crime	French–Italian co-production
Left-Hand Drive	Guy Lefranc	Dany Robin, Marcel Amont	Comedy, drama, romance	
Le Masque de fer	Henri Decoin	Jean Marais, Jean-François Poron, Claudine Auger	Adventure	French-Italian co-production
Le Septième juré	Georges Lautner	Bernard Blier, Danièle Delorme, Francis Blanche	Crime	
Les Mystères de Paris	André Hunebelle	Jean Marais, Jill Haworth, Dany Robin		French–Italian co-production
Liberté I	Yves Ciampi	Maurice Ronet, Corinne Marchand, Assan Fail	Comedy-drama	French–Senegal co-production
The Lovers of Teruel	Raymond Rouleau	Ludmilla Tchérina, René-Louis Lafforgue, Raymond Rouleau	Musical	
Mandrin	Jean-Paul Le Chanois	Georges Rivière, Silvia Monfort, Jeanne Valérie	Adventure	French-Italian co-production
The Monster with Green Eyes	Romano Ferrara	Michel Lemoine, Maria Pia Luzi, Jany Clair	Science fiction	Italian-French co-production
My Life to Live	Jean-Luc Godard	Anna Karina, Sady Rebbot, André S. Labarthe	Drama	
Paris Pick-Up	Marcel Bluwal	Robert Hossein, Lea Massari	Crime	French-Italian co-production
The Seven Deadly Sins	Various	Various	Comedy	French–Italian co-production. Seven segments by nine directors
Sundays and Cybele	Serge Bourguignon	Hardy Krüger, Nicole Courcel, Patricia Gozzi	Drama	
Thérèse Desqueyroux	Georges Franju	Emmanuelle Riva, Philippe Noiret, Édith Scob	Drama	
Three Fables of Love	René Clair	Manuel Alexandre, Charles Aznavour	Drama	French/Italian/Spanish co-production
A Touch of Treason	Édouard Molinaro	Roger Hanin, Pascale Audret, Dany Carrel, Claude Brasseur	Crime	
The Trial	Orson Welles	Anthony Perkins, Jeanne Moreau, Romy Schneider	Drama	French–West German–Italian co-production
The Trial of Joan of Arc	Robert Bresson	Florence Delay, André Maurice, Harry Sommers	Historical	
A Very Private Affair	Louis Malle	Brigitte Bardot, Marcello Mastroianni, Ursula Kubler	Drama	French–Italian co-production
A View from the Bridge	Sidney Lumet	Raf Vallone, Maureen Stapleton, Jean Sorel	Drama	French–Italian co-production
War of the Buttons	Yves Robert	Jean Richard, Jacques Dufilho, Michel Galabru	Children's, comedy	
Where the Truth Lies	Henri Decoin	Juliette Gréco, Jean-Marc Bory, Liselotte Pulver	Horror	

== See also ==
- 1962 in France
- 1962 in French television
