= Igor Barrère =

French doctor and media personality

- Born: Igor Harry Barère; 17 December 1931; Paris, France
- Died: 24 June 2001 (aged 69)
- Occupation: Television presenter
- Known for: Presenting La Tête et les Jambes

Igor Barrère (17 December 1931 – 24 June 2001) was a French doctor and television presenter.

== Biography ==
Igor Barrère began his career as the assistant of Orson Welles whilst studying to be a doctor. In the 1950s and 1960s Barrère is widely considered a pioneer of French television producing medical shows explaining medical procedures to the French public. The most well known shows that Barrere produced were such as La Caméra invisible and Cinq colonnes à la une,Faire face.

In 1989, Barrère headed the Conseil supérieur de l'audiovisuel.

== Honours ==
- Prix Italia
- Lion d'Or

== Publications ==
- Igor Barrère et Étienne Lalou, À quoi rêvent les enfants du monde, Delpire, 1963
- Igor Barrère et Jean-Marie Manus, Les Guetteurs du futur, Lattès
- Igor Barrère, En direct de la médecine.
- Igor Barrère et Étienne Lalou, Le Dossier confidentiel de l'euthanasie, Éditions du Seuil, 1975.
- Igor Barrère, Les pharmaciens parlent, Stock, 1976
