= La Caméra invisible =

French television show

- Presented by: Pierre Bellemare; Jacques Rouland
- Country of origin: France
- Original language: French

Production
- Running time: 30 minutes

Original release
- Network: RTF
- Release: April 30, 1964 – 1971

La Caméra invisible was a French television show created by Jacques Rouland, Pierre Bellemare and directed by Igor Barrère.

== Premise ==
La Caméra was a French adaptation of the American hidden camera show Candid Camera. The premise of the show was practical jokes were played on unsuspecting members of the public. It was first broadcast from April 1964 to 1971.
