= List of German films of the 1960s =

This is a list of the most notable films produced in Cinema of Germany during the 1960s.

For an alphabetical list of articles on West German films see Category:West German films. For East German films made during the decade see List of East German films.

Missing films may be Austrian productions.

== Sources ==
- Curti, Roberto (2019). Devil's Advocates: Blood and Black Lace. Auteur Publishing. ISBN 978-1-911325-93-2.
