= Martin Matje =

French illustrator (1962–2004)

Martin Matje (1962–2004) was a French illustrator. He was born in Paris, illustrated many books for children in his native France. He got a degree in Engineering and worked as a art director of the magazine Je Bouquine at Bayard Presse.

== Books ==
The number of book written by Martin Matie

- A PIG NAMED PERRIER
- A Straw for Two (Companion To: The Ink Drinker)
- Celeste: A Day in the Park
- Courage, Trouillard! (J'aime Lire)
- Drôle de cadeau dans le traîneau (Les Belles Histoires) (French Edition) [French]
- Harry and Lulu
- Little Red Ink Drinker
- The City of Ink Drinkers
- Wallace Hoskins, the Boy Who Grew Down
- When It Starts to Snow
