= Emel Heinreich =

Turkish actress, author and film director

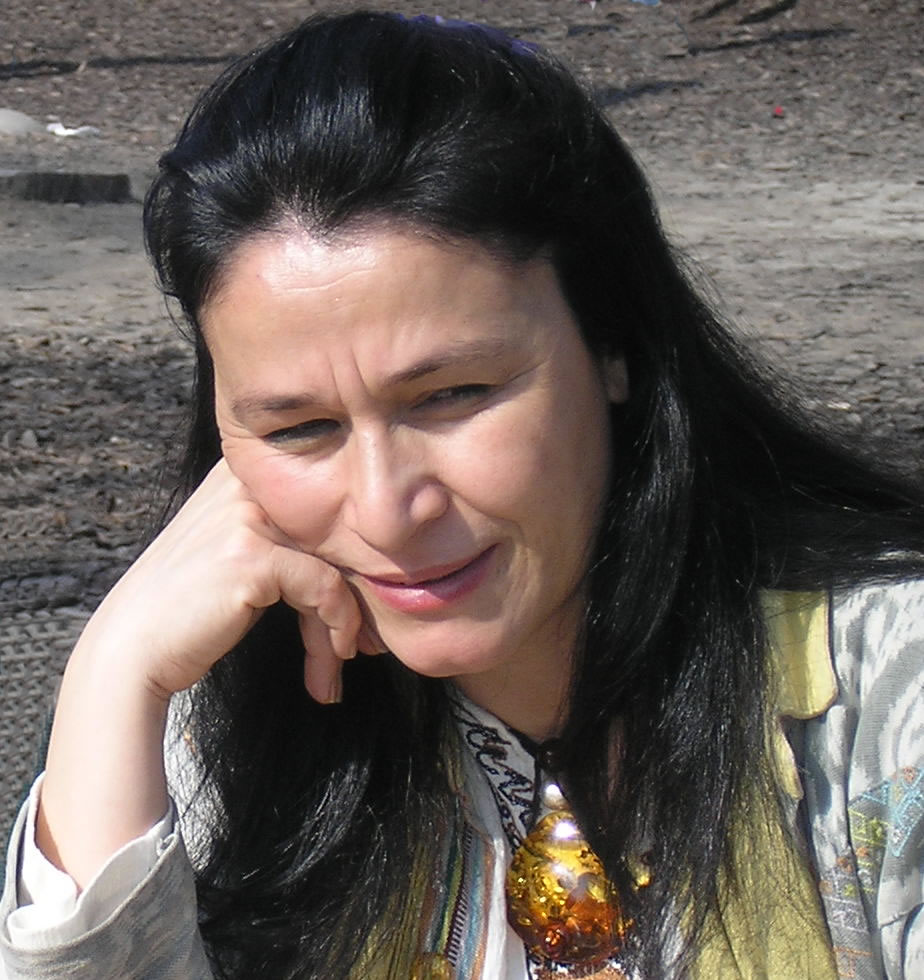
- Born: 27 June 1962 (age 63); Kayseri, Turkey
- Years active: 1986–present

Emel Heinreich (born 27 June 1962) is a Turkish actress, author and film director who works in Austria.

== Filmography ==
- 1986 Wir die Fremden
- 1989 Du bist eine
- 1989 Das Meer und die Frauen
- 1991 Das Blut der Rose
- 1995 Tujutaksu
- 1995 Kodoks Dream
- 1996 Hier, dort, irgendwo
- 1996 Du wirst essen die Frucht meines Herzens
- 1997 Mimpi Manis
- 1998 Wasserhaus
- 2009 Tatort
- 2009 Kommissar Rex
