= Faire face =

French television news show

- Created by: Igor Barrère
- Country of origin: France
- Original language: French
- No. of seasons: 2
- No. of episodes: 11

Original release
- Network: RTF
- Release: 10 June 1960 – February 9, 1962

Faire Face is a French television news show created by Igor Barrère which featured documentary and debate on social subjects and was broadcast on RTF from 1960 to 1962.
