= Cinq colonnes à la une =

French television show

- Presented by: Pierre Lazareff; Pierre Desgraupes; Pierre Dumayet; Igor Barrère
- Country of origin: France
- Original language: French
- No. of seasons: 10

Production
- Running time: 90 minutes

Original release
- Network: RTF
- Release: 9 January 1959 – May 3, 1968

Cinq colonnes à la une is a French television news program that focused on investigative journalism. It aired from 1959 to 1968, ran for 90 minutes, and received critical acclaim.

== Bibliography ==
- Hervé Brusini, Francis James, Voir la vérité, le journalisme de télévision, PUF, 1982
- Jean-Noël Jeanneney, Monique Sauvage, Télévision nouvelle mémoire, Seuil-INA, 1982 (tout entier consacré à 5 colonnes à la une)
- Pierre Desgraupes, Hors antenne, Quai Voltaire, 1992
- Robert Soulé, Lazareff et ses hommes, Grasset, 1992
- Yves Courrière, Pierre Lazareff ou le Vagabond de l’actualité, Gallimard, 1995
- Pierre Baylot (dir.), Les Magazines de reportage à la télévision, Cinémaction No. 84, Corlet-Télérama, 1997
- David Buxton, Le Reportage de télévision en France depuis 1959, L’Harmattan, 2000
- Aude Vassallo, La Télévision sous de Gaulle : Le contrôle gouvernemental de l'information (1958-1969), INA-De Boeck, 2005
