= The Tale of Zatoichi Continues =

- Theatrical poster
- Directed by: Kazuo Mori
- Written by: Kazuo Mori
- Starring: Shintarō Katsu
- Cinematography: Shōzō Honda
- Edited by: Toshio Taniguchi
- Music by: Ichirō Saitō
- Production company: Daiei Film
- Distributed by: Daiei Film
- Release date: October 12, 1962
- Running time: 72 minutes
- Country: Japan
- Language: Japanese

The Tale of Zatoichi Continues (続・座頭市物語, Zoku Zatōichi Monogatari) is a 1962 Japanese film directed by Kazuo Mori and starring Shintaro Katsu as Zatōichi the blind swordsman, a character created by Kan Shimozawa. The Tale of Zatoichi Continues is the second entry in the popular, long-running Zatoichi series.

== Plot ==
One year after the first film, Zatōichi travels back to the town near the Joshoji Temple, to pay respects at the grave of Hirate, the samurai he killed. Three brigands attack Zatōichi while he dries his clothes, and are despatched by a one-armed swordsman. Later that day, Zatōichi is hired to massage a powerful lord who, unbeknownst to all but the lord's highest retainers, is insane. Zatōichi observes the nobleman's unstable mental condition, and the retainers decide to kill him. Zatōichi defeats the first three attackers, and retires to a restaurant. The attack having failed, the lord's men hire local yakuza (gangsters) to finish the job. Learning of this, Zatoichi remarks to himself that he would have kept quiet if they had just asked him to do so.

Three prostitutes in the restaurant discuss how many men are now looking for Zatōichi, and how they will have no business. One of them, Setsu, grows very fond of Zatōichi very quickly, asking him to spend the night with her, and saying that her own father was blind and yet married three women. While Zatōichi sits in a back room the one-armed swordsman, Yoshiro, and his companion enter the same restaurant. The companion remarks how Setsu looks exactly like Chiyo, a woman Yoshiro once loved. Yoshiro demands that Setsu spend the night with him. Setsu refuses, and Zatōichi re-enters the room. Yoshiro tells a short story of how Chiyo left him after he became a cripple. Zatōichi says that he too loved a woman named Chiyo but that she, upon discovering he was blind, left him for the man she hated most in the world. In his rage, Zatōichi says, he sought out this man and attacked him. Zatōichi leaves with Setsu. In the morning, she remarks that it is as if they were married. Learning that he is to be killed, she urges Zatōichi to leave, but he awaits the attackers.

Sukegoro, the yakuza boss with whom Yoshiro has been staying, returns from his travels, having learned that Yoshiro is a wanted criminal, only posing as a samurai. He confronts Yoshiro and tells him it is time for him to leave. Yoshiro, on his way out of town, hears that Zatōichi is planning on going to the temple to pay respects. He decides to go there too, but he is followed and the constabulary are alerted. Otane, who is to be married, hears of Zatōichi's return, and races to the temple, too. On his own way to the temple, Zatōichi stops by the stream where he once fished with Hirate (in the previous film), and laments the loss of the only man he could call friend. He also regrets his failure to understand Otane's desire to marry him (also in the previous film), and recalls his love for Chiyo, who was stolen from him by his brother: Yoshiro.

At the temple, Otane meets Zatōichi. Yoshiro arrives and says he wants to kill his younger brother in revenge for crippling him. Zatōichi questions the necessity of this, since Yoshiro has already stolen Chiyo from him. Yoshiro responds that he has killed Chiyo. Yoshiro disarms Zatōichi but the latter stabs him with his own wakizashi. The constabulary arrive and Zatōichi flees with the stricken Yoshiro. Otane brings food to them in hiding, and overhears Zatōichi saying that he is happy Otane is getting married, and hopes she is happy in her life. Despite Zatoichi's care, Yoshiro dies, but only after revealing that Chiyo is not dead: she left him, he says, after he became crippled, and he doesn't know where she is.

Zatōichi seeks out Sukegoro, and tells him that two men have died for him in his petty crime wars, and because of this he too must die. The film ends abruptly with Zatōichi having just delivered what is presumably the killing cut.

== Cast ==
- Shintarō Katsu as Zatōichi
- Yoshie Mizutani (Yaeko Mizutani) as Osetsu
- Masayo Banri as Otane
- Tomisaburō Wakayama (credited as Jō Kenzaburō) as Nagisa no Yoshirō
- Yutaka Nakamura as Kagami no Sanzō
- Sōnosuke Sawamura as Seki no Kanbei
- Eijirō Yanagi as Sukegorō Hanoka
- Saburō Date as Morisuke

== Critical response ==
DVD Talk's review judges The Tale of Zatoichi Continues to be less interesting in plot than the previous film, The Tale of Zatoichi, but more quickly-paced than the first film. According to the review, the musical score by Ichirō Saitō is more melodramatic than Akira Ifukube's score for the first film, though melodrama is not out of character for the series. The casting of Tomisaburo Wakayama—lead actor Shintaro Katsu's older brother—in the role of Yoshirō, the one-armed swordsman, lends the film more interest.

In Stray Dogs & Lone Wolves: The Samurai Film Handbook (2005), Patrick Galloway also judges the pacing of this second film in the series to be tighter than the first. He notes that this film has the first large-scale battle in the series, with Zatōichi taking on fifty to sixty opponents at once. Galloway praises Katsu's ability to move quickly in a way that obscures the choreography in the fights.

== Availability ==
The Tale of Zatoichi Continues was released theatrically on October 12, 1962. In Japan, the film has been released on videotape in 1984 and 1992, and in DVD format in 2003. Home Vision Entertainment released it in the US on DVD on May 14, 2002.
