= Emmanuelle Jouannet =

French professor of Law

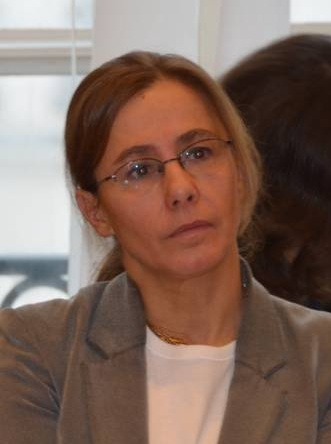
Emmanuelle Tourme-Jouannet

Emmanuelle Tourme-Jouannet (born July 28, 1962) is a professor of International law at the Sciences Po School of Law. She teaches and carries out research in International law, International dispute, Human rights and International humanitarian law as well as in History of law and Philosophy of law. Her career as a jurist and a philosopher has begun after having taken courses in law and philosophy respectively at Panthéon-Assas University (MA in Law) and the Paris-Sorbonne University (M. Phil).

== Professional commitments ==
Emmanuelle Tourme-Jouannet is a professor at Sciences Po since May 2014 and the co-editor-in-chief of the Journal of History of International Law.

She is a former professor at the Sorbonne University, where she acted as the legal director of the master's degree in international law at the Paris-Sorbonne University, Emmanuelle Tourme-Jouannet was also the Deputy Director of the Institut de recherche en droit international et européen (IREDIES). Through this research institute, she is the editor in chief of the Doctrine and the French Studies in International Law Collections. She is also an associate researcher at the UMR 8103 (Mixed research Unit) in Comparative law, Pantheon-Sorbonne University and at the Institut Michel-Villey pour la culture juridique et la philosophie du droit, Panthéon-Assas University. At an international level, Emmanuelle Tourme-Jouannet leads the joint programs between Paris 1 and both Columbia University and Cornell University. She is a member of the Editorial Board of the Journal européen de droit international (EJIL, The European Journal of International Law) and of Editorial committees of the Archives de Philosophie du droit (Archives of Philosophy of the law) et de la Revue belge de droit international (Belgium Magazine of International Law). In March, 2010, she becomes member of Academic Council of the Harvard Institute for Global Law and Policy (Harvard University). In 2011, Emmanuelle Tourme-Jouannet is placed in the direction of the international program of research in the IREDIES-CERDIN : Justice et Droit international dans un monde global (Justice and International law in a global world).

== Selected published books ==
- Droit international et nouvelles approches sur le Tiers Monde : entre répétition et renouveau, (International Law and New Approaches to the Third World: Between Repetition and Renewal), Mark TOUFAYAN, Emmanuelle TOURME-JOUANNET, Hélène RUIZ FABRI (dir.), SLC, Coll. UMR de droit comparé vol. 13
- What is a Fair International Society? International Law between Development and Recognition, Trad. C. Sutcliffe, Hart Publishing, Oxford, 2013, 252 p.
- Le droit international, Paris, PUF, Coll. Que sais-je?, 2013, 125 p.
- Les doctrines internationalistes durant les années de communisme réel en Europe, en codirection avec Iulia MOTOC, Paris, SLC, Coll. de l'UMR de droit comparé (n°27), 2012, 568 p.
- Le droit international libéral-providence, Une histoire du droit international, Brussels, Editions Bruylant, 2011. Ouvrage traduit, The Liberal-Welfarist Law of Nations, Editions Cambridge UP, Traduction de Chistopher Sutcliffe, 2012.
- Qu’est-ce qu’une société internationale juste ? Le droit international entre développement et reconnaissance, Paris, Editions Pedone, 2011.
- Emmer de Vattel et l'émergence doctrinale du droit international public, JOUANNET Emmanuelle, Paris, Éditions A. Pedone, 1998, ISBN 2-233-00330-6. Traduction : Vattel and the Emergence of Classic International Law, Traduction par BELLANDE Gina et HOWSE Robert (Prof. NYU), Londres, Hart Publishing, forthcoming November, 2009, ISBN 9781841136912.
  - Prix de l'université Paris-II (1994), prix Dupin-Aîné (1994), prix Maurice Picard de la Chancellerie des universités de Paris (1994). Subvention du ministère de l'Éducation nationale.
- ESIL Proceedings 2006: Wat's use of International Law ? , H. RUIZ-FABRI, E. JOUANNET et V. TOMKIEWICZ (dir), Londres, Hart Publishing, 2008, ISBN 9781841136882.
- Regards d'une génération de juristes sur le droit international, E. JOUANNET, H. RUIZ-FABRI et J-M SOREL (dir), Paris, Éditions A. Pedone, 2008, ISBN 978-2-233-00532-8.
- Le Droit international et l'impérialisme en Europe et en Amérique, JOUANNET Emmanuelle et H. RUIZ-FABRI (dir), Sociétés de droit et de législation comparée, 2007.

== Selected articles ==
1. Le principe de l'Or monétaire, à propos de l'arrêt du 30 juin 1995 dans l'affaire du Timor oriental, RGDIP (Revue générale de droit international public, General magazine of public international law), 1996, number 3, p. 673-714.
2. Regards sur un siècle de doctrine française du droit international, AFDI, 2000, p. 1-57.
3. Vattel et la sujétion directe de l'État au droit international, in L’État moderne (1715–1848), Studies gathered by professor Simone Goyard-Fabre, Paris, Édition Vrin, 2000, p. 153-179.
4. La critique de la pensée classique durant l'entre deux guerres : Vattel et Van Vollenhoven (quelques réflexions sur le modèle classique du droit international), Miskolc Journal of International Law, 2004, Vol.1, number 2.
5. Select Proceedings of the European Society of International Law, Miskolc Journal of International Law, Vol. 5. (2008) number 2. p. 136-137.
6. French and American Perspectives on International Law: Legal Cultures and International Law, Maine Law Review, 2006 vol 58, number 2, p. 291-336.
7. Between Universalim and Imperialism : the true-false paradoxe of International Law, EJIL, Vol 17 number 3, 2007, p. 407-450.
8. What is the Use of International Law ? , Michigan Journal of International Law, 2008, Vol. 28,
9. A Century of French International Law Scholarship, Maine Law Review, 2009, Vol. 61/1, p. 84-131.

== Published works ==
- Le principe de l'Or monétaire, à propos de l'arrêt du 30 juin 1995 dans l'affaire du Timor oriental, RGDIP (Revue générale de droit international public), 1996, no. 3, p. 673-714.
- Regards sur un siècle de doctrine française du droit international, AFDI, 2000, p. 1-57.
- Vattel et la sujétion directe de l'État au droit international, in L’État moderne (1715-1848), Études réunies par la professeure Simone Goyard-Fabre, Paris, Édition Vrin, 2000, p. 153-179.
- Histoire de la pensée juridique internationale in Droit international public, ouvrage collectif sous la direction du professeur ALLAND Denis, Paris, PUF, 2000, p. 69-96.
- Le droit non écrit, in Droit international public, ouvrage collectif sous la direction du professeur ALLAND Denis, Paris, PUF, 2000, p. 267-308.
- Le règlement de paix entre l'Éthiopie et l'Érythrée : un succès majeur pour l'ensemble de l'Afrique ? , RGDIP, 2001/4, p. 849-896.
- Quelques observations sur la signification de la notion d'urgence, Le contentieux de l'urgence et l'urgence dans le contentieux devant les juridictions internationales : regards croisés, H. Ruiz-Fabri et J. M Sorel, Paris, Éditions A. Pedone, 2001, p. 205-210.
- L'idée de communauté humaine à la croisée de la communauté des États et de la communauté mondiale, La mondialisation entre illusion et utopie, Archives de Philosophie du droit, t.47, 2003, p. 191-232.
- La notion de jurisprudence internationale en question, La juridictionnalisation du droit international, Colloque SFDI (Société française pour le droit international) de Lille, Paris, Éditions A. Pedone, 2003, p. 343-391.
- L'impossible protection des droits du tiers par la Cour internationale de Justice dans les affaires de délimitation maritime, La mer et son droit, Mélanges offerts à L. Luchini et J. P Quéneudec, Paris, Éditions A. Pedone, 2003, p. 315-341.
- Droit des gens (Du droit des gens au droit international), Dictionnaire de la culture juridique, sous la direction de S. RIALS et de D. ALLAND, Paris, PUF, 2003, p. 463-467.
- Prise (Droit de), Dictionnaire de la culture juridique, sous la direction de S. RIALS et de D. ALLAND, Paris, PUF, 2003, p. 1204-1207.
- La critique de la pensée classique durant l'entre-deux-guerres : Vattel et Van Vollenhoven (quelques réflexions sur le modèle classique du droit international), Miskolc Journal of International Law, 2004, Vol.1, no. 2 (journal électronique).
- Select Proceedings of the European Society of International Law, Miskolc Journal of International Law, Vol. 5. (2008) no. 2. p. 136-137 (journal électronique).
- La pensée juridique de Charles Chaumont, Revue belge de droit international, 2004/1, p. 259-289.
- Le juge international face au problème d'incohérence et d’instabilité du droit international, RGDIP, 2005/1, p. 52-76.
- La communauté internationale vue par les juristes, Annuaire français des relations internationales, 2005, Vol. VI, p. 3-26.
- Existe-t-il de grands arrêts de la Cour internationale de Justice ? , Les arrêts de la Cour internationale de Justice, Textes rassemblés par Charalambos Apostolidis, Dijon, Éditions universitaires de Dijon, 2005, p. 169-197.
- Les travaux préparatoires de la Charte des Nations unies, La Charte des Nations unies. Commentaire article par article, Jean-Pierre Cot, A. Pellet et M. Forteau, 3rd ed, Vol. I, Paris, Economica, 2005, p. 1-24.
- L'ambivalence des principes généraux face au caractère étrange et complexe de l'ordre juridique international, L'influence des sources sur l'unité et la fragmentation du droit international, R. HUESA VINAIXA et K. WELLENS, Bruylant, Brussels, 2006, p. 115-154.
- La saisine des juridictions internationales ou la simplicité dans la diversité, La saisine des juridictions internationales, H. Ruiz-Fabri et J-M Sorel (dir), Paris, Éditions A. Pedone, 2006, p. 307-317.
- French and American Perspectives on International Law: Legal Cultures and International Law, Maine Law Review, 2006 vol 58, no. 2, p. 291-336.
- Colonialisme européen et néo-colonialisme contemporain (Notes de lecture des manuels européens du droit des gens entre 1850 et 1914), Baltik Yearbook of International Law, 2006, Vol. 6, p. 49-78.
- Between Universalim and Imperialism : the true-false paradoxe of International Law, EJIL, Vol 17 (no. 3, 2007, p. 407-450.
- À quoi sert le droit international ? Le droit international providence du XXI^{e} siècle, Revue belge de droit international, 2007-1, vol. XL, p. 5-52.
- Présentation critique de la pensée de M. Koskenniemi, in M. KOSKENNIEMI, La politique du droit international, Collection CERDIN Doctrine(s), Paris, Éditions A. Pedone, 2007, p. 7-48.
- La preuve comme reflet des évolutions de la jurisprudence internationale, in La preuve devant les juridictions internationales, H. Ruiz-Fabri et J-M Sorel (dir), Paris, Éditions A. Pedone, 2007, p. 239-253.
- Présentation critique de la pensée de N. Berman, in N. BERMAN, Passions et ambivalences : le nationalisme, le colonialisme et le droit international, Paris, Éditions A. Pedone, Collection CERDIN Doctrine(s), 2008, p. 4-58.
- What is the Use of International Law ? , Michigan Journal of International Law, 2008, Vol. 28, no. 4, p. 815-862.
- La Motivation ou le mystère de la boîte noire, La motivation des décisions des juridictions internationales, H. Ruiz-Fabri et J-M Sorel (dir), Paris, Éditions A. Pedone, 2008, p. 251-285.
- Présentation de la pensée d’Olivier Corten, in O. CORTEN, Le discours du droit international. Pour un positivisme critique. Paris, Éditions A. Pedone, Collection CERDIN Doctrine(s), 2009, p. 4-36.
- A Century of French International Law Scholarship, Maine Law Review, 2009, Vol. 61/1, p. 84-131.
- L’indépendance et l’impartialité des juridictions internationales : l’émergence d’un tiers pouvoir international ?, in H. Ruiz-Fabri et J-M Sorel (dir), L’indépendance et l’impartialité des juridictions internationales, Paris, Pedone, 2010, p. 135-178.
- Vattel ou le droit des gens des Modernes, Yves Sandoz (dir), Réflexions sur l’impact, le rayonnement et l’actualité du droit des gens d’Emer de Vattel, Brussels, Bruylant, 2010, pp. 3–19.
- Les dualismes du droit des gens, in Chetail, Vincent et Haggenmacher, Peter (eds), Le droit international de Vattel vu du XXIème siècle, Leiden, Boston, M. Nijhoff, 2011, pp. 133–150.
- Koskenniemi : A Critical Introduction, in Koskenniemi, The Politics of International Law, Londres, Hart Publishing, 2011, pp. 1–32.
- Presentation, in Berman, Nathaniel, Passions and Ambivalences: Colonialism, Nationalism and International Law, Brill, 2012, pp. 1–35.
- Préface, Cançado Trindade, Antonio A, Le droit international pour la personne humaine, Paris, Pedone, pp. 3–4.
- ¿De qué sirve el derecho internacional? El derecho internacional providencia del siglo XXI, Revista de derecho público. Universidad de Los Andes (Bogotá, Colombia), No 27, Julio-Diciembre 2011, pp 1–47.
- How to Depart from the Existing Dire Conditions of Development ?, in A. Cassese (ed), Realizing Utopia. The future of International Law, Oxford UP, 2012, pp. 392–417.
- Reparations for Historical Wrongs : the lessons of Durban, in What is a Fair Internbational Society ? Hart Publishing, 2013, pp. 193–201. Forthcoming also with a Debate in the African Yearbook of International Law, 2014 -
- Des origines coloniales du droit international. A propos du droit des gens moderne du 18ème siècle in The Roots of International Law. Liber amicorum, Peter Haggenmacher, Leiden/Boston, M. Nijhoff, 2014, pp. 649–672 (forthcoming translation in English and publication in the JHIL 2015)

== Committees and societies ==
Emmanuelle Jouannet is member of the Editorial Board of the Journal européen de droit international, the Société européenne de droit international, the International group in Legal Theory, the Revue belge de droit international (RBDI)12, the magazine Archives de philosophie du droit, the BRILL's Series : Studies in History of International Law, the Société française pour la philosophie et la théorie juridiques et politiques (SFPJ), the Société française de droit international, the Société européenne de droit international, the Association française de philosophie du droit, the American Society of International Law, the Institut Michel-Villey pour la culture juridique et la philosophie du droit, the Institut européen des droits de l'homme, the Commission de validation des acquis de l'université Paris-I. Emmanuelle Jouannet is Member of the Academic Council du Institute for International Law and the Humanities of University of Melbourne, in Australia, and member of the Advisory Boards du French Law Program Faculty of the University of Maine.
