= The Tale of Zatoichi =

- Theatrical release poster
- Directed by: Kenji Misumi
- Screenplay by: Minoru Inuzuka
- Based on: The Tale of Zatoichi by Kan Shimozawa
- Produced by: Ikuo Kubodera
- Starring: Shintaro Katsu; Masayo Banri; Ryuzo Shimada; Gen Mitamura; Shigeru Amachi
- Cinematography: Chikashi Makiura
- Edited by: Kanji Suganuma
- Music by: Akira Ifukube
- Backgrounds by: Akira Naito
- Production company: Daiei Motion Picture Company
- Distributed by: Daiei Studios
- Release date: 12 April 1962
- Running time: 95 minutes
- Country: Japan
- Language: Japanese

The Tale of Zatoichi (Japanese: 座頭市物語, Hepburn: Zatōichi Monogatari) is a 1962 Japanese chanbara film directed by Kenji Misumi and based on the 1948 essay of the same name by Kan Shimozawa. It is the first installment in a long-running jidaigeki film series starring Shintaro Katsu as the blind swordsman Zatoichi.

== Plot ==
The blind masseur Zatoichi is hired as muscle for the yakuza Sukegoro (Eijiro Yanagi) as he thinks that war is inevitable with his rival Shigezo (Ryuzo Shimada). Zatoichi has a distinguished reputation as a swordsman and Sukegoro thinks that purchasing his services is money well spent. Shigezo responds by hiring a ronin of similar repute, Miki Hirate (Shigeru Amachi).

Ichi presents himself as a meek, humble man and is commonly underestimated and looked upon suspiciously. His being a masseur, which was a position of low regard in feudal Japan, merely increases the hostility that is shown towards him.

The only person who respects him is Hirate, who as a ronin understands what it feels like to be an outcast. Though Hirate and Ichi know they must fight when the war begins, they develop a sense of friendship. Hirate is eager to fight Zatoichi, as he is terminally ill with tuberculosis and wishes to die fighting. As Hirate becomes increasingly sick, Sukegoro takes advantage by ordering an all-out attack on Shigezo and removing Ichi from his payroll.

Hirate learns that Shigezo intends to kill Ichi anyway by sniping him with a tanegashima. The dying warrior drags himself from his bed and pledges to kill Ichi in an honorable manner. Ichi learns from a boy at the temple where Hirate was staying of his intentions, and also learns the reason. After the tense final fight, in which Zatoichi prevails and cuts Hirate down, he rejects the advances of the yakuza mistress Otane (Masayo Banri), who has become disillusioned with her lifestyle, to continue as a solitary wanderer.

== Cast ==
- Shintaro Katsu as Zatoichi
- Masayo Banri as Otane
- Ryūzō Shimada as Shigezo of the Sasagawa Yakuza
- Gen Mitamura as Hanji of Matsugishi
- Shigeru Amachi as Miki Hirate
- Chitose Maki as Hanji's wife Yoshi
- Ikuko Mōri as Shigezo's wife Oyutaka
- Michio Minami as Tatekichi of the Iioka Yakuza
- Eijirō Yanagi as Sukegoro of Iioka
- Toshio Chiba as Masakichi of Iioka
- Manabu Morita as Seisuke of Iioka
- Yoichi Funaki as Yogoro of Sasagawa
- Kin'ya Ichikawa as Mokichi of Sasagawa
- Eigorō Onoe as Rihei of Sasagawa
- Yoshito Yamaji as Tatekichi's father Yahei
- Yukio Horikita as Kanaji of Sasagawa
- Ryūji Fukui as Daihachi of Iioka

== Release ==
The Tale of Zatoichi was released in Japan on April 12, 1962. It was re-issued theatrically in 1976. The film was followed by The Tale of Zatoichi Continues later in 1962.

== Reception ==
The film received positive reviews earning 100% from review aggregator Rotten Tomatoes according to 7 reviews. The film summoned the most sequels of a samurai film and has also spawned a remake in 2003.
