= List of Soviet films of 1953 =

A list of films produced in the Soviet Union in 1953 (see 1953 in film) follows:

Title	Russian title	Director	Cast	Genre	Notes
1953
Admiral Ushakov	Адмирал Ушаков	Mikhail Romm	Ivan Pereverzev, Boris Livanov, Sergey Bondarchuk, Vladimir Druzhnikov, Gennadi Yudin	Biopic, war film, history	
Adventure in Odessa	Неразлучные друзья	Vasily Zhuravlyov	Mikhail Kuznetsov, Evgeniy Samoylov, Viktor Dobrovolsky, Aleksandr Antonov	Comedy, drama	
Aleko	Алеко	Grigoriy Roshal, Sergei Sidelyov	Aleksandr Ognivtsev, Mark Reizen, Inna Zubkovskaya	Opera	
Alyosha Ptitsyn Grows Up	Алёша Птицын вырабатывает характер	Anatoly Granik	Viktor Kargopoltsev	Comedy	
Anna Karenina	Анна Каренина	Tatyana Lukashevich	Alla Tarasova	Drama	
Attack from the Sea	Корабли штурмуют бастионы	Mikhail Romm	Ivan Pereverzev, Gennadi Yudin, Vladimir Druzhnikov, Aleksey Alekseev, Sergey Bondarchuk	Biopic, war film, history	
Belinsky	Белинский	Grigori Kozintsev	Sergei Kurilov, Aleksandr Borisov, Georgy Vitsin, Yuri Lyubimov	Biopic	
The Boarder	Нахлебник	Vladimir Basov and Mstislav Korchagin	Boris Chirkov	Drama	
Bride with a Dowry	Свадьба с приданым	Tatyana Lukashevich and Boris Ravenskih	Vera Vasilyeva	Comedy	
Chuk and Gek	Чук и Гек	Ivan Lukinsky	Yura Chuchunov	Comedy, drama	
A Comrade's Honour	Честь товарища	Nikolay Lebedev	Konstantin Skorobogatov	Drama	
A Fortress in the Mountains	Застава в горах	Vladimir Gerasimov and Konstantin Yudin	Vladlen Davydov	Adventure	
Hostile Whirlwinds	Вихри враждебные	Mikhail Kalatozov	Mikhail Kondratyev, Vladimir Yemelyanov	Biopic	
Incident in the Taiga	Случай в тайге	Yuri Yegorov	Aleksandr Antonov	Action	
Krechinsky's Wedding	Свадьба Кречинского	Vasili Vanin, Aleksey Zolotnitskiy	Yuri Fomichyov	Comedy	
Lights on the River	Огни на реке	Viktor Eisymont	Valery Pastukh	Comedy	
Lyubov Yarovaya	Любовь Яровая	Yan Frid	Zinaida Karpova, Igor Gorbachyov	Drama	
Marina's Destiny	Судьба Марины	Viktor Ivchenko	Yekaterina Litvinenko, Nikolai Gritsenko, Tatyana Konyukhova, Les Serdyuk	Drama	Entered into the 1954 Cannes Film Festival
Maksimka	Максимка	Vladimir Braun	Tolya Bovykin, Boris Andreyev, Vyacheslav Tikhonov	Adventure	
Mysterious Discovery	Таинственная находка	Boris Buneev	Aleksey Alekseev	Family	
The Return of Vasili Bortnikov	Возвращение Василия Бортникова	Vsevolod Pudovkin	Sergei Lukyanov	Drama	
Rimsky-Korsakov	Римский-Корсаков	Gennadi Kazansky, Grigori Roshal	Grigori Belov, Nikolai Cherkasov, Aleksandr Borisov	Biopic	
Ring of Daring	Арена смелых	Sergei Gurov and Yuriy Ozerov	Oleg Popov	Comedy	
Shadows	Тени	Nikolay Akimov, Nadezhda Kosheverova	Valentin Lebedev	Drama	
Silver Powder	Серебристая пыль	Pavel Armand, Abram Room	Mikhail Bolduman	Science fiction, drama	
Spring in Moscow	Весна в Москве	Iosif Kheifits, Nadezhda Kosheverova	Galina Korotkevich	Musical	
Stars of the Russian Ballet	Мастера русского балета	Gerbert Rappaport	Galina Ulanova, Konstantin Sergeyev, Natalya Dudinskaya	Ballet	Entered into the 1954 Cannes Film Festival
Steppe Dawns	Степные зори	Lev Saakov	Iya Arepina	Drama	
Vassa Zheleznova	Васса Железнова	Leonid Lukov	Vera Pashennaya, Mikhail Zharov	Drama	
Wolves and Sheep	Волки и овцы	Vladimir Sukhobokov	Vera Pashennaya, Igor Ilyinsky, Tatyana Yeremeyeva	Comedy	
Yegor Bulychov and Others	Егор Булычов и другие	Yuliya Solntseva, Boris Zakhava	Dina Andreeva, Sergei Lukyanov	Drama	

== See also ==
- 1953 in the Soviet Union
