= List of 1950s films based on actual events =

This is a list of films and miniseries that are based on actual events. Films on this list are generally from American production unless indicated otherwise.

== 1950 ==
- Annie Get Your Gun (1950) – comedy drama film loosely based on the life of sharpshooter Annie Oakley
- The Baron of Arizona (1950) – Western crime drama film based on the case of James Reavis whose attempted use of false documents to lay claim to the territory of Arizona late in the 19th century came close to success
- The Bells of Nagasaki (Japanese: 長崎の鐘) (1950) – Japanese romance film portraying the experiences of Takashi Nagai as a survivor of the atomic bombing of Nagasaki
- The Big Lift (1950) – war drama film telling the story of "Operation Vittles", the 1948–49 Berlin Airlift, through the experiences of two U.S. Air Force sergeants
- Cheaper by the Dozen (1950) – comedy drama film based upon the autobiographical book Cheaper by the Dozen (1948) by Frank Bunker Gilbreth Jr. and Ernestine Gilbreth Carey describing growing up in a family with twelve children, in Montclair, New Jersey
- Cyrano de Bergerac (1950) – adventure comedy film about poet and supreme swordsman Cyrano de Bergerac
- Fangio, the Demon of the Tracks (Spanish: Fangio, el demonio de las pistas) (1950) – Argentine sport drama film about the life of legendary Argentine motor racer Juan Manuel Fangio
- The Flowers of St. Francis (Italian: Francesco, giullare di Dio) (1950) – Italian biographical drama film based on the life and work of St. Francis and the early Franciscans
- Guilty of Treason (1950) – anti-Soviet biographical drama film about the story of József Mindszenty, a Roman Catholic cardinal from Hungary
- Highway 301 (1950) – crime drama film telling the story of a gang of career criminals, modeled on the real life Tri-State Gang, terrorizing and robbing banks and payrolls in North Carolina, Virginia and Maryland
- The Jackie Robinson Story (1950) – sport drama film focusing on Robinson's struggle with the abuse of bigots as he becomes the first African-American Major League Baseball player of the modern era
- Julius Caesar (1950) – historical drama film about Julius Caesar, based on the play of the same name by William Shakespeare
- Madeleine (1950) – British crime drama film based on a true story of Madeleine Smith, a young Glasgow woman from a wealthy family who was tried in 1857 for the murder of her lover, Emile L'Angelier
- The Magnificent Yankee (1950) – biographical drama film examining the life of United States Supreme Court Justice Oliver Wendell Holmes Jr.
- The Mudlark (1950) – British-American historical film depicting a fictional account of how Queen Victoria was eventually brought out of her mourning for her dead husband, Prince Albert
- Mussorgsky (Russian: Мусоргский) (1950) – Soviet biographical drama film about the emergence of Russian composer Modest Mussorgsky
- Never Fear (1950) – drama film based on the true story of dancer who is about to embark on a major career and is devastated to learn that she has contracted polio, she is sent to Kabat-Kaiser Institute for rehabilitation, where she meets fellow patients in recovery. By allowing others to share her grief, Carol is able to pull herself together and go on with her life
- Odette (1950) – British biographical war film depicting the true story of Special Operations Executive French agent, Odette Sansom, living in England, who was captured by the Germans in 1943, condemned to death and sent to Ravensbrück concentration camp to be executed
- Over the Waves (Spanish: Sobre las olas) (1950) – Mexican biographical musical film portraying the life of the composer Juventino Rosas
- The Petty Girl (1950) – biographical musical film about painter George Petty who falls for Victoria Braymore, the youngest professor at Braymore College who eventually becomes "The Petty Girl"
- Samadhi (Hindi: समाधि) (1950) – Indian Hindi-language war drama film concerning Subhas Chandra Bose and the Indian National Army during World War II
- Sending of Flowers (French: Envoi de fleurs) (1950) – French historical drama film portraying the life of the composer Paul Delmet
- The Sound of Fury (1950) – crime drama film based on events that occurred in 1933 when two men were arrested in San Jose, California for the kidnapping and murder of Brooke Hart
- Three Came Home (1950) – war drama film depicting Agnes Newton Keith's life in North Borneo in the period immediately before the Japanese invasion in 1942, and her subsequent internment and suffering, separated from her husband Harry, and with a young son to care for
- Three Little Words (1950) – biographical musical film about the Tin Pan Alley songwriting partnership of Bert Kalmar and Harry Ruby
- Two Suspects (Norwegian: To mistenkelige personer) (1950) – Norwegian crime drama film about the murder of two sheriffs in Norway and the subsequent hunt for the criminals, loosely based on a real incident that happened in Ådal in 1926
- The Wooden Horse (1950) – British war drama film depicting the true events of an escape attempt made by POWs in the German prison camp Stalag Luft III
- Young Daniel Boone (1950) – Western drama film based on the life of Daniel Boone
- Young Man with a Horn (1950) – musical drama film inspired by the life of jazz cornetist Bix Beiderbecke
- Zhukovsky (Russian: Жуковский) (1950) – Soviet biographical film based on the life of Russian scientist Nikolai Zhukovsky, founding father of modern aero- and hydrodynamics

== 1951 ==
- A Place in the Sun (1951) – drama film inspired by the real-life murder of Grace Brown by Chester Gillette in 1906, which resulted in Gillette's conviction and execution by electric chair in 1908
- Air Cadet (1951) – war drama film about United States Air Force (USAF) pilots in training
- Al Jennings of Oklahoma (1951) – Western drama film based on the story of Al Jennings, a former train robber turned attorney
- Appointment with Venus (1951) – British war drama film based on the evacuation of Alderney cattle from the Channel Island during World War II
- The Basketball Fix (1951) – sport drama film based on the CCNY point shaving scandal
- Casabianca (1951) – French war drama film telling the story of the French submarine Casabianca in World War Two
- The Desert Fox: The Story of Rommel (1951) – biographical war film based on the book Rommel: The Desert Fox by Brigadier Desmond Young, who served in the British Indian Army in North Africa
- David and Bathsheba (1951) – historical epic film following King David's life and his relationship with Uriah's wife Bathsheba
- Dick Turpin's Ride (1951) – adventure romance film following the career of the eighteenth century highwaymen Dick Turpin
- Follow the Sun (1951) – biographical sport drama film about the life of golf legend Ben Hogan
- Fourteen Hours (1951) – drama film based on an article by Joel Sayre in The New Yorker describing the 1938 suicide of John William Warde
- The Franchise Affair (1951) – British mystery thriller film based on the true story of the investigation of a mother and daughter accused of kidnapping a local young woman
- The Frogmen (1951) – adventure drama film based on operations by United States Navy Underwater Demolition Teams, popularly known as "frogmen", against the Japanese Army and naval forces
- Go for Broke! (1951) – war drama film depicting the real-life story of the 442nd Regimental Combat Team, which was composed of Nisei (second-generation Americans born of Japanese parents) soldiers
- The Great Caruso (1951) – biographical drama film about the life of famous operatic tenor Enrico Caruso
- The Great Missouri Raid (1951) – Western drama film about the James–Younger Gang
- I Was an American Spy (1951) – war drama film dramatizing the true story of Claire Phillips, an American expat who spied on the Japanese during World War II and was captured, tortured, and sentenced to death before being rescued
- I'd Climb the Highest Mountain (1951) – biographical drama film based on Corra Harris' biographical book of a Methodist minister, called to a north-Georgia mountain-community in 1910 who, with his gently bred new bride, meets the problems and crises of his circuit-riding congregation fearlessly and honestly
- I'll See You in My Dreams (1951) – biographical musical film about lyricist Gus Kahn
- Jim Thorpe – All-American (1951) – biographical drama film about Jim Thorpe, the great Native American athlete who won medals at the 1912 Olympics and distinguished himself in various sports, both in college and on professional teams
- The Lady with a Lamp (1951) – British historical drama film depicting the life of Florence Nightingale and her work with wounded British soldiers during the Crimean War
- The Living Christ Series (1951) – drama miniseries about the life of Jesus Christ
- The Magic Box (1951) – British biographical drama film about William Friese-Greene, who designed and patented one of the earliest working cinematic cameras
- Monsieur Fabre (1951) – French historical comedy film based on the life of the entomologist Jean-Henri Fabre and his total devotion to studying insect behavior, travelling from Avignon to Paris, from Paris to his death in Sérignan
- Murder in the Cathedral (1951) – British historical drama film portraying the assassination of Archbishop Thomas Becket in Canterbury Cathedral during the reign of Henry II in 1170
- Our Lady of Fatima (Spanish: La señora de Fátima) (1951) – Spanish drama film telling the story of the 1917 miracle of Fatima, in which the Virgin Mary supposedly appeared to three children—two girls and one boy
- Quo Vadis (1951) – biographical drama film set in ancient Rome during the final years of Emperor Nero's reign
- The Red Inn (French: L'auberge rouge) (1951) – French comedy crime film based on the actual crime case of the inn l'Auberge rouge in Peyrebeille, where the innkeeper confesses to a number of serious sins
- The Tall Target (1951) – historical crime film based on the alleged Baltimore Plot
- The Tanks Are Coming (1951) – war drama film chronicling the U.S. 3rd Armored Division's advance across northern France and its attempt to pierce the Siegfried Line
- Taras Shevchenko (Russian: Тарас Шевченко) (1951) – Soviet biographical film about the Ukrainian writer Taras Shevchenko
- Valentino (1951) – biographical drama film about Rudolph Valentino
- Warsaw Premiere (Polish: Warszawska premiera) (1951) – Polish historical film portraying the life of the Polish composer Stanisław Moniuszko, particularly focusing on the composition of his 1848 opera Halka
- The Wild Blue Yonder (1951) – war drama film dealing with the Boeing B-29 Superfortress air raids on Japan during World War II
- Wherever She Goes (1951) – Australian drama film depicting the early part of the life story of pianist Eileen Joyce
- The Young Caruso (Italian: Enrico Caruso: leggenda di una voce) (1951) – Italian biographical drama film about Enrico Caruso

== 1952 ==
- 5 Fingers (1952) – film noir spy film based on the true story of Albanian-born Elyesa Bazna, a spy with the code name of Cicero who worked for the Nazis in 1943–44 while he was employed as valet to the British ambassador to Turkey, Sir Hughe Montgomery Knatchbull-Hugessen
- Above and Beyond (1952) – biographical war drama film about Lt. Col. Paul W. Tibbets Jr., the pilot of the aircraft that dropped the atomic bomb on Hiroshima in August 1945
- Anand Math (Hindi: आनंद मठ) (1952) – Indian Hindi-language historical drama film set in the events of the Sannyasi Rebellion, which took place in the late 18th century in Bengal
- Angels One Five (1952) – British war drama film telling the story of an RAF fighter squadron at the height of the Battle of Britain
- Blackbeard the Pirate (1952) – adventure film about Blackbeard, an English pirate who operated around the West Indies and the eastern coast of Britain's North American colonies
- Bwana Devil (1952) – adventure film based on the true story of the Tsavo maneaters
- Carbine Williams (1952) – biographical drama film following the life of David Marshall Williams who invented the operating principle for the M1 carbine while in a North Carolina prison
- The Composer Glinka (Russian: Композитор Глинка) (1952) – Soviet biographical film about the Russian composer Mikhail Glinka
- Gift Horse (1952) – British war drama film based on HMS Campbeltown and the St Nazaire Raid
- The Girl in White (1952) – biographical drama film based on the memoirs of the pioneering female surgeon Emily Dunning Barringer
- Golden Helmet (French: Casque d'Or) (1952) – French historical drama film loosely based on an infamous love triangle between the prostitute Amélie Élie and the Apache gang leaders Manda and Leca, which was the subject of much sensational newspaper reporting during 1902
- Hans Christian Andersen (1952) – musical film about Hans Christian Andersen, the 19th-century Danish author of many world-famous fairy tales
- Heroic Charge (Italian: Carica eroica) (1952) – Italian war drama film based on the battle of Izbushensky
- Hoodlum Empire (1952) – film noir crime film inspired by the Kefauver Committee hearings dealing with organized crime
- I Dream of Jeanie (1952) – historical musical film based on the songs and life of Stephen Foster who wrote the 1854 song "Jeanie with the Light Brown Hair"
- Immortal Melodies (Italian: Melodie immortali) (1952) – Italian biographical musical film based on real life events of classical composer Pietro Mascagni
- The Immortal Song (Marathi: अमर गाणे) (1952) – Indian Marathi-language biographical film telling the true story about Honaji Bala, a simple cow herder, who has an innate gift of poetry, set in the waning days of the Maratha confederacy
- In the Name of the Law (Turkish: Kanun namina) (1952) – Turkish drama film based on real events regarding a love triangle that led to homicide, that took place in Istanbul, in the following years of World war II
- The Iron Mistress (1952) – Western biographical film based on the life of Jim Bowie
- Kalle Karlsson of Jularbo (Swedish: Kalle Karlsson från Jularbo) (1952) – Swedish musical drama film based on the life and music of the accordion player Carl Jularbo
- Little Aurore's Tragedy (French: La petite Aurore: l'enfant martyre) (1952) – Canadian French-language biographical drama film based on a true story of Aurore Gagnon, an abused child
- Million Dollar Mermaid (1952) – biographical drama film about the life of Australian swimming star Annette Kellerman
- The Miracle of Our Lady of Fatima (1952) – historical drama film about the events surrounding the 1917 apparitions of Our Lady of Fátima in Portugal
- The Mistress of Treves (Italian: La Leggenda di Genoveffa) (1952) – Italian historical drama film based on the legend of Genevieve of Brabant and is set during the time of the Crusades
- Moulin Rouge (1952) – British historical romantic drama film following artist Henri de Toulouse-Lautrec in 19th-century Paris's bohemian subculture in and around the Moulin Rouge, a burlesque palace
- No Greater Love (German: Herz der Welt) (1952) – West German historical drama film based on the life of Alfred Nobel
- The Novel of My Life (Italian: Il romanzo della mia vita) (1952) – Italian biographical film depicting real life events of singer-actor Luciano Tajoli
- Operation Secret (1952) – biographical drama film based on the exploits of US Marine Corps Major Peter Ortiz
- The Pride of St. Louis (1952) – biographical sport drama film based on the life of Major League Baseball Hall of Fame pitcher Dizzy Dean
- Red Ball Express (1952) – war drama film based on the Red Ball Express convoys that took place after the D-Day landings in Normandy in June 1944
- Red Shirts (Italian: Camicie rosse) (1952) – Italian historical drama film portraying the life of Anita Garibaldi, the wife of Italian unification leader Giuseppe Garibaldi
- Rome 11:00 (Italian: Roma, ore 11) (1952) – Italian drama film based on the real story of an accident that happened on 15 January 1951 on Via Savoia in Rome when a staircase collapsed because of the weight of two hundred women waiting for a job interview.
- The Secret Conclave (Italian: Gli uomini non guardano il cielo) (1952) – Italian drama film tells the story of Pope Pius X as he makes every effort to prevent the outbreak of the First World War
- Somebody Loves Me (1952) – comedy drama musical film focusing on the careers of entertainers Blossom Seeley and Benny Fields
- Stars and Stripes Forever (1952) – biographical musical film about the late-19th-/early-20th-century composer and band leader John Philip Sousa
- The Story of Will Rogers (1952) – Western comedy film depicting the life of humorist and movie star Will Rogers
- Thunderbirds (1952) – war drama film depicting the exploits of the 45th Infantry Division in the Italian campaign of World War II
- Viva Zapata! (1952) – Western drama film about the life of Mexican Revolutionary Emiliano Zapata from his peasant upbringing through his rise to power in the early 1900s and his death in 1919
- Walk East on Beacon (1952) – film noir drama film about the meeting of German physicist and atomic spy Klaus Fuchs and American chemist Harry Gold as well as of the Soviet espionage network in the United States
- The Winning Team (1952) – biographical sport drama film based on the life of major league pitcher Grover Cleveland Alexander
- With a Song in My Heart (1952) – biographical musical drama film telling the story of actress and singer Jane Froman, who was crippled by an airplane crash on 22 February 1943, when the Boeing 314 Pan American Clipper flying boat she was on suffered a crash landing in the Tagus River near Lisbon
- Youth of Chopin (Polish: Młodość Chopina) (1952) – Polish biographical drama film telling the story of Frédéric Chopin's life between 1825 and 1830 (ages 15 to 21)

== 1953 ==
- The Actress (1953) – comedy drama film based on Ruth Gordon's autobiographical play Years Ago
- Admiral Ushakov (Russian: Адмирал Ушаков) (1953) – Soviet historical war film portraying the career of Feodor Ushakov, a celebrated naval officer and contemporary of Horatio Nelson
- Albert R.N. (1953) – British war drama film based on the true story of a dummy constructed in Marlag O used by prisoners of war in bids to escape
- Anatahan (Japanese: アナタハン) (1953) – Japanese war drama film inspired by the World War II Japanese holdouts on Anatahan
- Attack from the Sea (Russian: Корабли штурмуют бастионы) (!953) – Soviet war drama film about the career of the Russian naval officer Fyodor Ushakov and the Siege of Corfu (1798–99)
- Barabbas (1953) – Swedish drama film about Barabbas who was released and pardoned instead of Jesus
- Belinsky (Russian: Белинский) (1953) – Soviet biographical film based on the life of Russian literary critic Vissarion Belinsky
- Calamity Jane (1953) – Western musical drama film loosely based on the life of Wild West heroine Calamity Jane and explores an alleged romance between her and Wild Bill Hickok
- Captain John Smith and Pocahontas (1953) – historical Western film depicting the foundation of the Jamestown Colony in Virginia by English settlers and the relationship between John Smith and Pocahontas
- Crazylegs (1953) – biographical sport drama film about Elroy Hirsch's football career
- The Cruel Sea (1953) – British war film portraying the conditions in which the Battle of the Atlantic was fought between the Royal Navy and Germany's U-boats, seen from the viewpoint of the British naval officers and seamen who served in convoy escorts
- The Dark World (Turkish: Karanlık Dünya) (1953) – Turkish biographical drama film depicting a realistic account of the life of the bard Veysel, shot in his native village
- The Desert Rats (1953) – war film concerning the Siege of Tobruk in 1941 North Africa during World War II
- Destination Gobi (1953) – war drama film about the Sino-American Cooperative Organization (SACO), loosely based on actual events
- Eagle of the Pacific (Japanese: 太平洋の鷲) (1953) – Japanese epic war film dramatizing the start of Japan's military action in World War II, with an emphasis on the role of Isoroku Yamamoto
- The Eddie Cantor Story (1953) – musical drama film based on the life of Eddie Cantor
- El Alamein (1953) – war drama film depicting the 1942 Battle of El Alamein during the North African Campaign
- Flight Nurse (1953) – war drama film based on the life of Lillian Kinkella Keil, one of the most decorated women in American military history
- Franz Schubert (German: Franz Schubert – Ein Leben in zwei Sätzen) (1953) – Austrian biographical drama film depicting composer Franz Schubert's life and work
- The Great Warrior Skanderbeg (Albanian: Luftëtari i madh i Shqipërisë Skënderbeu; Russian: Великий воин Албании Скандербег) (1953) – Albanian-Soviet biographical film about George Kastriot Skanderbeg, widely known as Skanderbeg, a 15th-century Albanian lord who defended his land against the Ottoman Empire for more than two decades
- Hell Raiders of the Deep (Italian: I sette dell'Orsa maggiore) (1953) – Italian war drama film based on the events of the Raid on Alexandria in 1941 by frogmen of the Decima Flottiglia MAS human torpedoes
- The Hitch-Hiker (1953) – film noir thriller film depicting a fictionalized version of the Billy Cook murder spree
- Hostile Whirlwinds (Russian: Вихри враждебные) (1953) – Soviet historical film portraying the first years of Soviet government, in particular the role of Felix Dzerzhinsky in 1918–1921
- Houdini (1953) – biographical drama film based upon the life of magician and escape artist Harry Houdini
- The I Don't Care Girl (1953) – biographical musical film about the entertainer Eva Tanguay
- Jhansi Ki Rani (Hindi: झाँसी की रानी) (1953) – Indian Hindi-language historical drama film about the bravery of queen Lakshmibai, Rani of Jhansi, who took up arms and led her army against the British in the Mutiny of 1857
- The Joe Louis Story (1953) – film noir sport drama film about the story of boxer Joe Louis and his rise from poverty to becoming heavyweight champion of the world
- The Lawless Breed (1953) – biographical crime Western film based on the life of outlaw John Wesley Hardin
- Malta Story (1953) – British war film set during the air defence of Malta during the Siege of Malta in the Second World War, loosely based on the experiences of Adrian Warburton
- Martin Luther (1953) – American-West German biographical drama film depicting the life of German priest Martin Luther
- Melba (1953) – British biographical musical film depicting the life of Australian-born soprano Nellie Melba
- Nero and the Burning of Rome (Italian: Nerone e Messalina) (1953) – Italian epic historical drama film loosely based on real life events of Roman emperor Nero
- The President's Lady (1953) – biographical drama film based on the life of American president Andrew Jackson and his marriage to Rachel Donelson Robards
- Puccini (1953) – Italian biographical musical film about the life of Giacomo Puccini
- Rimsky-Korsakov (Russian: Римский-Корсаков) (1953) – Soviet biographical drama film portraying the life of the Russian composer Nikolai Rimsky-Korsakov
- Rob Roy: The Highland Rogue (1953) – adventure film about Rob Roy MacGregor
- The Secret of Blood (Czech: Tajemství krve) (1953) – Czech biographical drama film about Czech doctor Jan Janský who discovered and classified the four different blood types
- Serpent of the Nile (1953) – historical adventure film tells the story of the Egyptian Queen Cleopatra and her relationship with the Roman general Mark Antony from the time of assassination of Julius Caesar until their mutual suicide in 30 BC
- Shri Chaitanya Mahaprabhu (Hindi: श्री चैतन्य महाप्रभु) (1953) – Indian Hindi-language biographical film about the 15th century "medieval Vaishnav poet saint" and social reformer of Bengal, Chaitanya Mahaprabhu, whom many considered an Avatar of Krishna
- So This Is Love (1953) – musical drama film based on the life of singer Grace Moore
- Stalag 17 (1953) – war drama film based on their experiences as prisoners in Stalag 17B in Austria
- The Story of Gilbert and Sullivan (1953) – British musical drama film about the collaboration between Gilbert and Sullivan
- The Sword and the Rose (1953) – American-British historical adventure film telling the story of Mary Tudor, the younger sister of Henry VIII
- Titanic (1953) – drama film about fictional passengers on the ill-fated maiden voyage of the RMS Titanic, which took place in April 1912
- The Unconquerables (German: Die Unbesiegbaren) (1953) – East German biographical drama film based on the 1889 Westphalia miners strike
- Verdi, the King of Melody (Italian: Tragedia y Triunfo de Verdi) (1953) – Italian biographical drama film based on adult life events of the composer Giuseppe Verdi
- The Wild One (1953) – crime drama film inspired by sensationalistic media coverage of an American Motorcyclist Association motorcycle rally that got out of hand on the Fourth of July weekend in 1947 in Hollister, California
- Julius Caesar (1953) – historical drama film about Julius Caesar, based on the play of the same name by William Shakespeare
- Young Bess (1953) – biographical drama film about the early life of Elizabeth I, from her turbulent childhood to the eve of her accession to the throne of England

== 1954 ==
- Attila (Italian: Attila, il flagello di Dio) (1954) – Italian historical drama film based on the life of Attila the Hun
- Beau Brummell (1954) – British biographical drama film based on the life of Beau Brummell
- Betrayed (1954) – war drama film based on the story of turncoat Dutch resistance leader Christiaan Lindemans, also known as "King Kong"
- The Bob Mathias Story (1954) – sport drama film telling the story of Bob Mathias, the first man to win two consecutive Olympic Gold Medals in the Decathlon in London in 1948 and in Helsinki in 1952
- Canaris (1954) – West German drama film portraying real events during the Second World War when Wilhelm Canaris the head of German military intelligence was arrested and executed for his involvement with the 20 July Plot to overthrow Adolf Hitler
- Casta Diva (1954) – Italian biographical melodrama film based on the story of the famous musician Vincenzo Bellini
- Deep in My Heart (1954) – biographical musical film about the life of operetta composer Sigmund Romberg, who wrote the music for The Student Prince, The Desert Song, and The New Moon, among others
- Désirée (1954) – historical romance film depicting the rise and fall of Napoleon Bonaparte and his romance with Désirée Clary
- Drum Beat (1954) – Western adventure drama film using elements of the 1873 Modoc War in its narrative, with Ladd playing a white man asked by the U.S. Army to attempt negotiations with Native Modocs who are about to wage war
- Ernst Thälmann – Son of his Class (German: Ernst Thälmann – Sohn seiner Klasse) (1954) – biographical drama film about the life of Ernst Thälmann, leader of the Communist Party of Germany during much of the Weimar Republic
- The Eternal Waltz (German: Ewiger Walzer) (1954) – West German drama film dramatizing the life of Johann Strauss II
- Folgore Division (Italian: Divisione Folgore) (1954) – Italian war film based on actual events and depicts the 185th Infantry Division "Folgore" during the Second Battle of El Alamein
- The Glenn Miller Story (1954) – biographical drama film about the American band-leader Glenn Miller
- His Majesty O'Keefe (1954) – biographical adventure film telling the story of Captain David O'Keefe
- House of Ricordi (Italian: Casa Ricordi) (1954) – Italian historical biographical film based on the early history of the Italian music publishing house Casa Ricordi
- Human Torpedoes (Italian: Siluri umani) (1954) – Italian war film depicting the WWII 1941 raid on Souda Bay by Italian Navy frogmen on the Royal Navy's HMS York heavy cruiser and a Norwegian oil tanker
- Joan of Arc at the Stake (Italian: Giovanna d'Arco al rogo) (1954) – Italian biographical drama film based on the oratorio Jeanne d'Arc au bûcher by Paul Claudel and Arthur Honegger
- John Wesley (1954) – British historical biographical film depicting the life of the father of Methodism, John Wesley
- King Richard and the Crusaders (1954) – historical drama film about the life of Richard I of England
- The Law vs. Billy the Kid (1954) – Western drama film based on the life of Billy the Kid
- The Life of Surgeon Sauerbruch (German: Sauerbruch – Das war mein Leben) (1954) – West German biographical drama film about the life of Ferdinand Sauerbruch
- Madame du Barry (1954) – French historical drama film depicting the life of Madame du Barry, mistress to Louis XV in the eighteenth century
- Mahatma Phule (Marathi: महात्मा फुले) (1954) – Indian Marathi-language biographical film based on the life of social reformer and activist Jyotirao Govindrao Phule
- Mirza Ghalib (Hindi: मिर्ज़ा गालिब; Urdu: مرزا غالب) (1954) – Indian Hindi and Urdu language biographical film based on the life of well-known poet Mirza Ghalib
- Queen Margot (French: La Reine Margot) (1954) – French adventure historical drama film about the life of Margaret of Valois
- Rasputin (French: Raspoutine) (1954) – French historical drama film portraying the rise and fall of the Russian priest and courtier Grigori Rasputin
- The Red Prince (German: Der rote Prinz) (1954) – Austrian-West German historical drama film based on the story of Archduke Johann Salvator of Austria
- Salt of the Earth (1954) – historical drama film based on the 1951 strike against the Empire Zinc Company in Grant County, New Mexico
- Samurai I: Musashi Miyamoto (Japanese: 宮本武蔵) (1954) – Japanese biographical adventure film loosely based on the life of the famous Japanese swordsman Miyamoto Musashi
- Sign of the Pagan (1954) – historical drama film based on an attack by Attila the Hun and the capture of Marcian
- Sitting Bull (1954) – Western film depicting the war between Sitting Bull and the American forces, leading up to the Battle of the Little Bighorn and Custer's Last Stand
- Theodora, Slave Empress (Italian: Teodora, imperatrice di Bisanzio) (1954) – Italian-French historical film about Theodora, a former slave who married Justinian I, emperor of Byzantium in AD 527–565
- They Who Dare (1954) – British war film based on Operation Anglo that took place during World War II in the Dodecanese islands where special forces attempted to disrupt the Luftwaffe and Regia Aeronautica from threatening Allied forces in Egypt
- War Arrow (1954) – Western drama film based on the Seminole Scouts
- When I Leave (Spanish: Cuando me vaya) (1954) – Mexican musical drama film portraying the life of the bolero composer María Grever
- The White Rose (Spanish: La rosa blanca) (1954) – Cuban-Mexican drama film portraying the life of the nineteenth-century Cuban poet José Martí, a leading advocate of the country's independence from Spain

== 1955 ==
- A Man Called Peter (1955) – biographical drama film based on the life of preacher Peter Marshall, who served as Chaplain of the United States Senate and pastor of the New York Avenue Presbyterian Church in Washington, D. C., before his early death
- Above Us the Waves (1955) – British war drama film about human torpedo and midget submarine attacks in Norwegian fjords against the German battleship Tirpitz
- Aces Looking for Peace (Spanish: Los ases buscan la paz) (1955) – Spanish sports drama film portraying the life of the Hungarian footballer Ladislao Kubala
- Adriana Lecouvreur (1955) – Italian biographical drama film about 18th-century actress Adrienne Lecouvreur
- Beautiful but Dangerous (Italian: La donna più bella del mondo) (1955) – Italian comedy drama film about Italian opera soprano Lina Cavalieri
- Cell 2455 Death Row (1955) – biographical crime drama film based on the life of convicted robber, rapist and kidnapper Caryl Chessman
- Chief Crazy Horse (1955) – Western biographical drama film about the life of Lakota Sioux Chief Crazy Horse
- The Cockleshell Heroes (1955) – British war drama film depicting a heavily fictionalised version of Operation Frankton, the December 1942 raid on German cargo shipping by British Royal Marines Commandos, who infiltrated Bordeaux Harbour using folding kayaks
- The Colditz Story (1955) – British war drama film about Pat Reid, a British army officer who was imprisoned in Oflag IV-C, Colditz Castle, in Germany during the Second World War and who was the Escape Officer for British POWs within the castle
- The Court-Martial of Billy Mitchell (1955) – biographical drama film based on the notorious 1925 court-martial of General Billy Mitchell, who is considered a founding figure of the U.S. Air Force
- The Dam Busters (1955) – British epic war film telling the true story of Operation Chastise when in 1943 the RAF's 617 Squadron attacked the Möhne, Eder, and Sorpe dams in Nazi Germany with Barnes Wallis's bouncing bomb
- Ernst Thälmann – Leader of his Class (German: Ernst Thälmann – Führer seiner Klasse) (1955) – East German biographical drama film about the life of Ernst Thälmann, leader of the Communist Party of Germany during much of the Weimar Republic
- The Eternal Breasts (Japanese: 乳房よ永遠なれ) (1955) – Japanese biographical drama film about the life of tanka poet Fumiko Nakajō
- The Eternal Sea (1955) – biographical war film following the career of Captain John Hoskins, who loses his leg at the Battle of Leyte Gulf and resists attempts to retire him and continues his military service after learning to cope with his disability
- The Girl in the Red Velvet Swing (1955) – biographical crime drama film telling the story of Evelyn Nesbit, a beautiful showgirl caught in a love triangle with elderly architect Stanford White and eccentric young millionaire Harry Kendall Thaw
- I'll Cry Tomorrow (1955) – biographical drama film telling the story of Lillian Roth, a Broadway star who rebels against the pressure of her domineering mother and struggles with alcoholism after the death of her fiancé
- Interrupted Melody (1955) – biographical musical film telling the story of Australian soprano Marjorie Lawrence's rise to fame as an opera singer and her subsequent triumph over polio with her husband's help
- Lady Godiva of Coventry (1955) – historical drama film depicting the story of Lady Godiva
- Land of the Pharaohs (1955) – epic historical drama film depicting an account of the building of the Great Pyramid
- The Last Command (1955) – Western film based on the life of Jim Bowie and the Battle of the Alamo
- Lola Montès (1955) – French-West German biographical romantic drama film depicting the life of Irish dancer and courtesan Lola Montez and tells the story of the most famous of her many notorious affairs, those with Franz Liszt and Ludwig I of Bavaria
- The Long Gray Line (1955) – biographical comedy drama film based on the life of Marty Maher
- Love Is a Many-Splendored Thing (1955) – romantic-drama film telling the story of a married, but separated, American reporter Mark Elliot, who falls in love with a Eurasian doctor originally from China, Han Suyin, only to encounter prejudice from her family and from Hong Kong society
- Love Me or Leave Me (1955) – romantic musical drama film recounting the life of Ruth Etting, a singer who rose from dancer to movie star
- Ludwig II (German: Ludwig II: Glanz und Ende eines Königs) (1955) – West German historical drama film based on the life of the nineteenth century ruler Ludwig II of Bavaria
- Magic Fire (1955) – biographical comedy drama film about the life of composer Richard Wagner
- Mikhaylo Lomonosov (Russian: Михайло Ломоносов) (1955) – Soviet biographical film about the great Russian scientist Mikhailo Lomonosov, who, after completing his studies in Germany, returns to Russia, where he dreams of creating scientific centers and opening a university
- Mozart (1955) – Austrian drama film exploring the mental state of Mozart during production of his final opera The Magic Flute
- Music in the Blood (German: Musik im Blut) (1955) – West German biographical musical film portraying the life of the musician Kurt Widmann
- Napoléon (1955) – French historical epic film depicting major events in the life of Napoleon
- The Night Holds Terror (1955) – film noir crime film based on a true story of the 1953 kidnapping of wealthy family man Gene Courtier
- The Night My Number Came Up (1955) – British mystery drama film based on a real incident in the life of British Air Marshal Sir Victor Goddard
- The Phenix City Story (1955) – film noir crime film based on the political career of Albert Patterson in Phenix City, Alabama
- Piyoli Phukan (Assamese: পিয়োলি ফুকন) (1955) – Indian Assamese-language biographical film based on the life and struggle of a historical character of Assam, Piyoli Phukan, son of Badan Borphukan, who revolted against British occupation
- Prince of Players (1955) – biographical drama film about the 19th century American actor Edwin Booth
- Richard III (1955) – British historical drama film about the life and reign of Richard III of England
- Samurai II: Duel at Ichijoji Temple (Japanese: 続宮本武蔵) (1955) – Japanese biographical action film loosely based on the life of the famous Japanese swordsman, Miyamoto Musashi
- Sardar (Hindi: सरदार) (1955) – Indian Hindi-language biographical film based on the life of Sardar Vallabhbhai Patel, one of India's greatest nationalists and the first Home Minister of India
- Seven Angry Men (1955) – Western biographical film about the abolitionist John Brown, particularly his involvement in Bleeding Kansas and his leadership of the Raid on Harpers Ferry
- Seven Cities of Gold (1955) – historical adventure film telling the story of the eighteenth-century Franciscan priest, Father Junípero Serra and the founding of the first missions in what is now California
- The Seven Little Foys (1955) – biographical comedy film telling the story of Eddie Foy Sr.
- Swami Vivekananda (Hindi: स्वामी विवेकानंद) (1955) – Indian Hindi-language biographical film based on the biography of Indian Hindu monk Swami Vivekananda
- To Hell and Back (1955) – biographical action film about the experiences of Audie Murphy as a soldier in the U.S. Army in World War II
- The Virgin Queen (1955) – historical drama film focusing on the relationship between Elizabeth I of England and Sir Walter Raleigh
- Wiretapper (1955) – biographical crime drama film based on the true story of Jim Vaus Jr.

== 1956 ==
- A Man Escaped (French: Un condamné à mort s'est échappé ou Le vent souffle où il veut) (1956) – French prison drama film based on a memoir by André Devigny, a member of the French Resistance who was held in Montluc prison during World War II by the occupying Germans
- Alexander the Great (1956) – epic historical drama film about the life of Macedonian general and king Alexander the Great
- Anastasia (1956) – historical drama film about rumors that the Grand Duchess Anastasia Nikolaevna of Russia, the youngest daughter of the late Tsar Nicholas II and Empress Alexandra Feodorovna, survived the execution of her family in 1918
- The Battle of the River Plate (1956) – British war drama film about the Battle of the River Plate, an early World War II naval engagement in 1939 between a Royal Navy force of three cruisers and the German pocket battleship Admiral Graf Spee
- Beatrice Cenci (1956) – French-Italian historical drama film about Beatrice Cenci, a young Roman noblewoman who murdered her abusive father, Count Francesco Cenci
- The Benny Goodman Story (1956) – biographical musical drama film capturing several major moments in Benny Goodman's life
- The Best Things in Life Are Free (1956) – biographical musical film about real-life songwriting team Buddy DeSylva, Lew Brown, and Ray Henderson
- The Conqueror (1956) – epic historical drama film telling the story of Mongol chief Temujin (later to be known as Genghis Khan) who battles against Tartar armies and for the love of the Tartar princess Bortai
- Daniel Boone, Trail Blazer (1956) – historical Western adventure film depicting how frontiersman Daniel Boone and his family had to fight for survival when overtures of peace fail and culminate in a frontal assault on the fort
- Death of a Scoundrel (1956) – film noir drama film depicting a fictionalized adaptation of the life and mysterious death of Serge Rubinstein
- The Duchess of Plakendia (Greek: Η Δούκισσα της Πλακεντίας) (1956) – Greek historical drama film about the life of Sophie de Marbois-Lebrun, Duchess of Plaisance
- The Eddy Duchin Story (1956) – biographical drama film about band leader and pianist Eddy Duchin
- The First Texan (1956) – Western biographical film about Sam Houston and the Texas Revolution
- The Great Locomotive Chase (1956) – Western adventure film about the Great Locomotive Chase that occurred in 1862 during the American Civil War
- The Harder They Fall (1956) – film noir sport drama film based on the tragic tale of true-life fighter Primo Carnera
- The King and I (1956) – musical drama film based on memoirs written by Anna Leonowens, who became school teacher to the children of King Mongkut of Siam in the early 1860s
- Lust for Life (1956) – biographical drama film about the life of the Dutch painter Vincent van Gogh
- The Man Who Never Was (1956) – British spy thriller film chronicling Operation Mincemeat, a 1943 British intelligence plan to deceive the Axis powers into thinking the Allied invasion of Sicily would take place elsewhere in the Mediterranean
- Marie Antoinette Queen of France (French: Marie-Antoinette reine de France) (1956) – French historical drama film about Marie Antoinette, the last queen of France before the French Revolution
- Miracle of the White Suit (Spanish: Un traje blanco) (1956) – Spanish biographical drama film about poor seven-year old Marcos who wants his First Communion in a white suit
- Podhale on Fire (Polish: Podhale w ogniu) (1956) – Polish historical drama film about the Kostka-Napierski uprising
- Reach for the Sky (1956) – British biographical war drama film about aviator Douglas Bader
- Roland the Mighty (Italian: Orlando e i Paladini di Francia) (1956) – Italian historical film about the Battle of Roncevaux Pass in AD 778, where Roland, a knight in the service of Charlemagne was killed while defending the rear-guard of the Frankish army as it retreated across the Pyrenees
- Samurai III: Duel at Ganryu Island (Japanese: 宮本武蔵完結編 決闘巌流島) (1956) – Japanese action drama film loosely based on the life of the famous Japanese swordsman, Miyamoto Musashi
- Somebody Up There Likes Me (1956) – biographical sport drama film based on the life of middleweight boxing legend Rocky Graziano
- Spy for Germany (German: Spion für Deutschland) (1956) – West German spy thriller film depicting the mission of a German spy Erich Gimpel during the Second World War to discover how far the American nuclear programme had progressed
- The Ten Commandments (1956) – epic Christian drama film dramatizing the biblical story of the life of Moses, an adopted Egyptian prince who becomes the deliverer of his real brethren, the enslaved Hebrews, and thereafter leads the Exodus to Mount Sinai, where he receives, from God, the Ten Commandments
- The Trapp Family (German: Die Trapp-Familie) (1956) – West German comedy drama film about the real-life Austrian musical Trapp Family
- The Vicious Circle (German: Der Teufelskreis) (1956) – East German drama film about the Reichstag fire trial
- Wakanohana: the Story of Devil of the Dohyō (Japanese: 若ノ花物語 土俵の鬼) (1956) – Japanese sport drama film about sumo wrestler Wakanohana Kanji I
- Walk the Proud Land (1956) – Western biographical drama film recounting the first successful introduction of limited self-government by John Clum (1851–1932), Indian agent for the San Carlos Apache Indian Reservation in the Arizona Territory
- The Wrong Man (1956) – film noir drama film based on the true story of an innocent man charged with a crime, as described in the book The True Story of Christopher Emmanuel Balestrero by Maxwell Anderson

== 1957 ==
- A Dreamer's Journey (Swedish: En drömmares vandring) (1957) – Swedish biographical drama film based on the life of the poet Dan Andersson
- A Lesson in History (Russian: Урок истории; Bulgarian: Урокът на историята) (1957) – Soviet-Bulgarian historical drama film about Georgi Dimitrov
- The Abductors (1957) – film noir crime drama film about a real life attempt to steal Abraham Lincoln's corpse that took place on 27 October 1876 in Oakridge Cemetery, Springfield Illinois
- After the Ball (1957) – British biographical film about the life of the stage performer Vesta Tilley
- All Mine to Give (1957) – romantic drama film based on the true story of an immigrant family in 1850's Wisconsin who prosper until tragedy strikes
- Baby Face Nelson (1957) – film noir crime drama film based on the real-life 1930s gangster Baby Face Nelson
- The Barretts of Wimpole Street (1957) – British historical drama film based on the romance between Robert Browning and Elizabeth Barrett, and her father's unwillingness to allow them to marry
- Battle Hymn (1957) – biographical war drama film about Dean E. Hess, a real-life United States Air Force fighter pilot in the Korean War who helped evacuate several hundred war orphans to safety
- Beau James (1957) – biographical drama film about Jimmy Walker, the colorful but controversial Mayor of New York City from 1926 to 1932
- The Buster Keaton Story (1957) – biographical drama film following the life of Buster Keaton
- The Case of Doctor Laurent (French: Le cas du Docteur Laurent) (1957) – French drama film dedicated to the pioneers of the Psychoprophylactic method of painless childbirth which, in 1952, the method was first applied in France
- The Crucible (French: Les Sorcières de Salem) (1957) – French-East German historical drama film depicting a dramatized and partially fictionalized story of the Salem witch trials that took place in the Massachusetts Bay Colony during 1692–93
- The Devil Strikes at Night (German: Nachts, wenn der Teufel kam) (1957) – West German crime drama film based on the true story of Bruno Lüdke
- Fear Strikes Out (1957) – biographical sport drama film depicting the life and career of American baseball player Jimmy Piersall
- The Flying Dutchman (Dutch: De Vliegende Hollander) (1957) – Dutch biographical drama film about the life of famed aviator Anthony Fokker
- Gunfight at the O.K. Corral (1957) – Western biographical drama film based on the 1881 gunfight at the O.K. Corral
- Guns Don't Argue (1957) – crime drama film about the early achievements of the FBI in defeating the most notorious criminals of the 1930s
- The Helen Morgan Story (1957) – biographical drama film based on the life and career of torch singer/actress Helen Morgan
- Ill Met by Moonlight (1957) – British action drama film based on events during W. Stanley Moss's service on Crete during World War II as an agent of the Special Operations Executive (SOE)
- Jeanne Eagels (1957) – biographical film based on the life of stage star Jeanne Eagels
- The Joker Is Wild (1957) – musical drama film about Joe E. Lewis, the popular singer and comedian who was a major attraction in nightclubs from the 1920s to the early 1950s
- Kean: Genius or Scoundrel (Italian: Kean – Genio e sregolatezza) (1957) – Italian historical biographical film based on the life of nineteenth century actor Edmund Kean
- Man of a Thousand Faces (1957) – biographical drama film detailing the life of silent movie actor Lon Chaney
- Monkey on My Back (1957) – biographical drama film about real-life world champion boxer and World War II hero Barney Ross
- Nine Lives (Norwegian: Ni Liv) (1957) – Norwegian biographical action film about Jan Baalsrud, a commando and member of the Norwegian resistance during World War II
- Omar Khayyam (1957) – historical adventure film about Omar Khayyam, the eponymous Persian poet
- The One That Got Away (1957) – British biographical war film chronicling the true exploits of Oberleutnant Franz von Werra, a Luftwaffe pilot shot down over Britain in 1940
- Pardesi (Hindi: परदेसी; Russian: Хождение за три моря) (1957) – Indian-Soviet historical adventure film based on the travelogues of Russian traveller Afanasy Nikitin, called A Journey Beyond the Three Seas, which is now considered a Russian literary monument
- Paths of Glory (1957) – anti-war drama film loosely based on the true-life affair of four French soldiers who were executed to set an example to the rest of the troops during World War I
- Portland Exposé (1957) – film noir drama film inspired by crime boss Jim Elkins and the McClellan Committee's investigation into Portland's underground criminal ventures in the 1940s and 1950s
- Queen Louise (German: Königin Luise) (1957) – West German historical drama film depicting the life of Louise of Mecklenburg-Strelitz, the wife of Frederick William III of Prussia, and her stand against Napoleon during the Napoleonic Wars
- Road to the Stars (Russian: Дорога к звёздам) (1957) – Soviet biographical film depicting mostly the life and scientific contributions of Konstantin Tsiolkovsky, along with the basic principles of rocket propulsion, ballistics, and space flight
- Saint Joan (1957) – historical drama film about the life of Joan of Arc
- Sewer (Polish: Kanał) (1957) – Polish war film about the 1944 Warsaw Uprising, telling the story of a company of Home Army resistance fighters escaping the Nazi onslaught through the city's sewers
- Slaughter on Tenth Avenue (1957) – film noir crime drama film based on the non-fiction book The Man Who Rocked the Boat, an autobiography by William Keating, chronicling Keating's experiences as an assistant district attorney and as counsel to the New York City Anti-Crime Committee
- The Spirit of St. Louis (1957) – biographical adventure film focusing on Lindbergh's lengthy preparation for, and accomplishment of, his history-making transatlantic flight in the purpose-built Spirit of St. Louis high-wing monoplane. His takeoff begins at Roosevelt Field and ends 33 hours later on 21 May 1927, when he lands safely at Le Bourget Field in Paris
- The Story of Mankind (1957) – fantasy film loosely based on the non-fiction book The Story of Mankind (1921) by Hendrik Willem van Loon
- Story of Tetsuharu Kawakami: number 16 (Japanese: 川上哲治物語 背番号16) (1957) – Japanese sport drama film about Japanese baseball player Tetsuharu Kawakami
- Stresemann (1957) – West German biographical drama film portraying the career of the German Minister for Foreign Affairs Gustav Stresemann in the 1920s
- The Three Faces of Eve (1957) – film noir mystery drama film about the life of Chris Costner Sizemore
- The Tommy Steele Story (1957) – British drama musical film about Tommy Steele and his rise to fame as a teen idol
- The True Story of Jesse James (1957) – Western drama film focusing on the relationship between the two James brothers during the last 18 years of Jesse James' life
- The Wings of Eagles (1957) – biographical war drama film based on the life of Frank "Spig" Wead and the history of U.S. Naval aviation from its inception through World War II
- Yangtse Incident: The Story of H.M.S. Amethyst (1957) – British war drama film telling the story of the British sloop HMS Amethyst caught up in the Chinese Civil War and involved in the 1949 Yangtze Incident

== 1958 ==
- A Night to Remember (1958) – British historical disaster film about the final night of RMS Titanic, which sank on her maiden voyage after she struck an iceberg in 1912
- A Song Goes Round the World (German: Ein Lied geht um die Welt) (1958) – West German biographical musical film about the life of the singer and film actor Joseph Schmidt
- Anarkali (Urdu: انارکلی) (1958) – Pakistani historical drama film revolving around the love of Jahangir for a slave girl Anarkali which creates a serious conflict between Prince Jahangir and his father, Mughal emperor Akbar
- Battle of the V-1 (1958) – British war drama film telling the story of a Polish Resistance group, which discovers details of the manufacture of the German V-1 'Flying Bomb' at Peenemünde in 1943
- The Bonnie Parker Story (1958) – film noir crime film based on the life of Bonnie Parker, a well-known outlaw of the 1930s
- The Buccaneer (1958) – adventure drama film taking place during the War of 1812, telling a heavily fictionalized version of how the privateer Lafitte helped in the Battle of New Orleans and how he had to choose between fighting for America or for the side most likely to win, the United Kingdom
- Carve Her Name with Pride (1958) – British war drama film based on the true story of Special Operations Executive agent Violette Szabo, GC, who was captured and executed while serving in Nazi-occupied France
- The Case Against Brooklyn (1958) – film noir crime film featuring depictions of American police corruption based on the True Magazine article "I Broke the Brooklyn Graft Scandal" by crime reporter Ed Reid
- Confess, Doctor Corda (German: Gestehen Sie, Dr. Corda) (1958) – West German film noir crime film based on a true criminal case from Steyr, Austria, which caused a great stir in 1955
- The Csardas King (German: Der Czardas-König) (1958) – West German biographical musical film about the life of the Hungarian operetta composer Emmerich Kalman
- Damn Citizen (1958) – film noir crime film telling the true story of a police chief hired to wipe out corruption in the Louisiana State Police
- Darby's Rangers (1958) – war drama film about William Orlando Darby, who organizes and leads the first units of United States Army Rangers during World War II
- Dunkirk (1958) – British war drama film depicting the Dunkirk evacuation of World War II
- E.A. — Extraordinary Accident (Russian: Ч. П. — Чрезвычайное происшествие) (1958) – Soviet crime drama film based on real events of the capture of the Soviet tanker "Tuapse" on 23 June 1954
- H-8 (1958) – Yugoslav thriller drama film based on a true story of a reckless car driver causes the collision of a bus and a truck on a two-lane road between Zagreb and Belgrade, in which the driver that caused a fatal 1957 bus-truck collision was never identified
- Herod the Great (Italian: Erode il grande) (1958) – Italian-French epic historical drama film about Herod the Great
- I Accuse! (1958) – British historical drama film based on the true story of the Dreyfus affair, in which a Jewish captain in the French Army was falsely accused of treason
- I Want to Live! (1958) – film noir biographical film following the life of Barbara Graham, a prostitute and habitual criminal who is convicted of murder and faces capital punishment
- I Was Monty's Double (1958) – British biographical war film about M. E. Clifton James, an actor who pretended to be General Bernard Montgomery as a decoy during World War II
- Ice Cold in Alex (1958) – British war drama film set during the Western Desert campaign of World War II
- The Inn of the Sixth Happiness (1958) – biographical war drama film based on the true story of Gladys Aylward, a tenacious British woman, who became a missionary in China during the Second Sino-Japanese War
- Iron Gustav (German: Der eiserne Gustav) (1958) – West German comedy drama film based on the real story of cab driver Gustav Hartmann who drove his droshky from Berlin to Paris
- It Happened One Night (Norwegian: I slik en natt) (1958) – Norwegian war drama film telling the true story of a young woman doctor who in 1942, helped several Jewish children escape the gestapo for the border to neutral Sweden
- Ivan the Terrible – Part II (Russian: Иван Грозный) (1958) – Soviet epic historical drama film about Ivan the Terrible as he attempts to consolidate his power by establishing a personal army, his political rivals, the Russian boyars, plot to assassinate their Tsar
- Jamila, the Algerian (Arabic: جميلة) (1958) – Egyptian historical drama film about one of the most important figures in the history of Algeria, Djamila Bouhired
- The Left Handed Gun (1958) – Western film portraying Billy the Kid as a misunderstood youth who got mixed up in a cattle war and was dragged down by the hostile population of New Mexico
- Machine-Gun Kelly (1958) – film noir biographical film chronicling the criminal activities of the real-life George "Machine Gun" Kelly
- Manhunt in the Jungle (1958) – biographical adventure film about adventurer George Miller Dyott as he is sent out to find a fellow adventurer, Percy Fawcett, who went missing in the Amazon jungle in 1925 while searching for the Lost City of Z
- Montparnasse 19 (French: Les Amants de Montparnasse) (1958) – French-Italian drama film based on the last years of the life of Italian artist Amedeo Modigliani, who worked and died in abject poverty in the Montparnasse area of Paris
- The Naked Maja (1958) – Italian-American biographical drama film about the romance between the painter Francisco Goya and the Duchess of Alba
- On Distant Shores (Azerbaijani: Uzaq Sahillərdə) (1958) – Soviet-era Azerbaijani war drama film portraying the life of the legendary Azerbaijani guerrilla of the Second World War Mehdi Huseynzade, who fought the Nazi forces in the present-day Italy and Slovenia
- Orders to Kill (1958) – British war drama film based on a story by Donald Chase Downes, a former American intelligence operative
- Rosemary (German: Das Mädchen Rosemarie) (1958) – West German drama film portraying the scandal that surrounded Rosemarie Nitribitt
- Sebastian Kneipp (1958) – Austrian historical biographical film about the Bavarian Sebastian Kneipp, one of the pioneers of naturopathic medicine
- The Silent Enemy (1958) – British historical action film about Lionel "Buster" Crabb depicting events in Gibraltar harbour during the World War II Italian frogman and manned torpedo attacks
- St. Louis Blues (1958) – biographical drama film based on the life of W. C. Handy
- Too Much, Too Soon (1958) – biographical drama film about Diana Barrymore who becomes reunited with her father after a ten-year estrangement and engages in his self-destructive lifestyle
- The Trapp Family in America (German: Die Trapp-Familie in Amerika) (1958) – West German comedy drama film about the real-life Austrian musical Trapp Family
- The Two-Headed Spy (1958) – British spy thriller film based upon Alexander Scotland's autobiography, The London Cage, and the military intelligence facility that interrogated captured Germans during the Second World War
- Underwater Warrior (1958) – war drama film telling the story of the US Navy's Underwater Demolition Teams between World War II and the Korean War

== 1959 ==
- A Poet's Fate (Russian: Судьба поэта) (1959) – Soviet drama film about the Iranian poet Rudaki, the founder of Persian poetry
- Al Capone (1959) – biographical crime drama film depicting a chronicle of the rise and fall of Chicago crime boss Al Capone during the Prohibition era
- Anatomy of a Murder (1959) – legal drama based on a 1952 murder case in which Michigan Supreme Court Justice John D. Voelker was the defense attorney
- Beloved Infidel (1959) – biographical drama film based on the relationship of F. Scott Fitzgerald and Sheilah Graham
- Bouboulina (Greek: Μπουμπουλίνα) (1959) – Greek biographical drama film featuring the heroine of the Greek Revolutionary of 1821 Laskarina Bouboulina
- Compulsion (1959) – biographical crime drama film depicting a fictionalized account of the Leopold and Loeb murder trial
- The Diary of Anne Frank (1959) – biographical drama film based on the posthumously published diary of Anne Frank, a German-born Jewish girl who lived in hiding in Amsterdam with her family during World War II
- The Five Pennies (1959) – biographical musical film about jazz cornet player and bandleader Loring "Red" Nichols
- The Gene Krupa Story (1959) – biographical drama film about American drummer and bandleader Gene Krupa
- General Della Rovere (Italian: Il generale Della Rovere) (1959) – Italian-French war drama film based on a story by Indro Montanelli which was in turn based on a true story
- The Great St. Louis Bank Robbery (1959) – heist drama film based on a 1953 bank robbery attempt of Southwest Bank in St. Louis
- Goliath and the Barbarians (Italian: Il terrore dei barbari) (1959) – Italian historical film loosely based on events of the Lombard invasion of Italy in AD 568
- Hannibal (Italian: Annibale) (1959) – Italian historical adventure film based on the life of Hannibal
- The Horse Soldiers (1959) – adventure war film depicting a fictionalized version of Grierson's Raid in Mississippi
- I, Sinner (Spanish: Yo, pecador) (1959) – Mexican biographical drama film about the life of José Mojica who was a famous Mexican singer and actor before retiring to the religious life
- Inside the Mafia (1959) – film noir crime film based on the Albert Anastasia murder and subsequent Apalachin Meeting
- Jagajyothi Basveshwara (Kannada: ಜಗಜ್ಯೋತಿ ಬಸವೇಶ್ವರ) (1959) – Indian Kannada-language biographical drama film based on the life Basaveshwar, a philosopher and social reformer from Karnataka who lived in the 12th century
- John Paul Jones (1959) – biographical adventure film about the American Revolutionary War naval hero
- Kattabomman, the Brave Warrior (Tamil: வீரபாண்டிய கட்டபொம்மன்) (1959) – Indian Tamil-language historical war film based on the story of Veerapandiya Kattabomman, the 18th-century South Indian chieftain who rebelled against the East India Company
- Love Now, Pay Later (German: Die Wahrheit über Rosemarie) (1959) – West German biographical drama film inspired by the life and death of Rosemarie Nitribitt
- Never So Few (1959) – war drama film loosely based on an actual OSS Detachment 101 incident
- Nie Er (Mandarin: 聂耳) (1959) – Chinese biographical drama film about Chinese musician Nie Er, a Communist Party member who drowned in Japan during his flight to Russia away from Nationalist oppression
- Operation Amsterdam (1959) – British war action film covering 12–13 May 1940 (Whit Sunday and Whit Monday) during the German invasion of the Netherlands, based on a true story
- Pork Chop Hill (1959) – war drama film depicting the first fierce Battle of Pork Chop Hill between the U.S. Army's 7th Infantry Division and Chinese and North Korean forces in April 1953
- Solomon and Sheba (1959) – epic historical romance film dramatizing events described in The Bible—the tenth chapter of First Kings and the ninth chapter of Second Chronicles
- Ten Ready Rifles (Spanish: Diez fusiles esperan) (1959) – Spanish war drama film concerning the Carlist Wars of the 19th century
- Vasily Surikov (Russian: Василий Суриков) (1959) – Soviet biographical drama film about the life and work of the great Russian painter Vasily Surikov
- The White Warrior (Italian: Agi Murad, il diavolo bianco) (1959) – Italian adventure drama film telling the story of Hadji Murad, a 19th-century Chechen chieftain who led his warriors in a fight against the invading forces of the Russian Czar
