= Court of Honor (disambiguation) =

A court of honor may be:

- A Court of Honor, an official event constituted to determine various questions of social protocol, breaches of etiquette
- A manorial court, the medieval court of honor
- The Court of Honor, the 1949 Soviet film known
- A Court of Honor ceremony in Scouting
- The court of honor at the Palais Bourbon
- Court of Honor in Milwaukee
- court of honor (architecture), the entry to a building
