= Grebeshkov =

Grebeshkov (masculine, Russian: Гребешков) or Grebeshkova (feminine, Russian: Гребешкова) is a Russian surname. Notable people with the surname include:

- Denis Grebeshkov (born 1983), Russian ice hockey player
- Nina Grebeshkova (1930–2025), Russian actress
