= Aleko (film) =

- Directed by: Sergei Sidelyov
- Written by: Alexander Pushkin (poem); Anna Abramova; Grigoriy Roshal
- Produced by: Vladimir Besprozvanny
- Starring: Aleksandr Ognivtsev; Mark Reizen; Inna Zubkovskaya; Svyatoslav Kuznetsov
- Cinematography: Anatoli Nazarov
- Edited by: Valentina Mironova
- Music by: Nikolay Rabinovich; Sergei Rachmaninoff (opera)
- Production company: Lenfilm Studio
- Release date: 1 January 1953
- Running time: 61 minutes
- Country: Soviet Union
- Language: Russian

Aleko (Russian: Алеко) is a 1953 Soviet romantic musical film directed by Sergei Sidelyov and starring Aleksandr Ognivtsev, Mark Reizen and Inna Zubkovskaya. It is based on Sergei Rachmaninoff's 1892 opera Aleko.

== Plot ==
In Bessarabia, a Romani camp serves as the setting for this tragic tale. One day, a Romani woman named Zemfira encounters Aleko, a man on the run from the law. Aleko takes refuge among the Romani and shares his life in exile with Zemfira.

Two years later, Aleko begins to suspect that Zemfira is unfaithful to him with a young Romani man. Her affections for Aleko have cooled, and she secretly meets her new lover at night. Overhearing the young man's song one evening, Aleko is consumed by jealousy and kills him. In a fit of rage, he also murders Zemfira when she protests. Her dying screams awaken the camp, and Zemfira's father confronts Aleko, declaring that the Romani people will not tolerate bloodshed and cannot live with a murderer.

After burying the dead, the Romani pack their belongings and move on, leaving Aleko behind. Alone and forsaken, he is left to face the consequences of his actions in solitude.

== Cast ==
- Aleksandr Ognivtsev as Aleko, the smitten
- Mark Reizen as Starik, Zyemfira's father
- Inna Zubkovskaya as Zyemfira, the flirt
- Svyatoslav Kuznetsov as Young Tsigan
- B. Zlatogorova as Aleko's Mother

== Bibliography ==
- Tatiana Egorova. Soviet Film Music. Routledge, 2014.
