= A Comrade's Honour =

- Directed by: Nikolay Lebedev
- Written by: Boris Izyumsky; Leonid Zhezhelenko; Gennadiy Michurin; Vladimir Druzhnikov; Yuriy Tolubeev; Lev Frichinsky
- Starring: Konstantin Skorobogatov; Boris Kokovkin
- Cinematography: Veniamin Levitin
- Music by: Vladimir Maklakov
- Production company: Lenfilm Studio
- Release date: 30 December 1953
- Running time: 84 minutes
- Country: Soviet Union
- Language: Russian

A Comrade's Honour (Russian: Честь товарища, romanized: Chest tovarishcha) is a 1953 Soviet drama film directed by Nikolay Lebedev and starring Konstantin Skorobogatov, Boris Kokovkin and Gennadiy Michurin.

== Plot ==
Based on Boris Izyumsky's novella Red Epaulets, the film explores the education of future officers of the Soviet Army. Major Bokhanov (Vladimir Druzhnikov), the new instructor at a Suvorov Military School, is immediately tasked with resolving a conflict involving senior cadet Gennady Pashkov and his peers. Gennady, arrogant and self-centered, often mocked friendships between boys and girls and was willing to betray his comrades. However, under the guidance of the experienced Bokhanov and with the passage of time, Gennady's behavior transforms. By the time the cadets graduate, his friends are confident that Pashkov will become a capable and respected commander.

== Cast ==
- Konstantin Skorobogatov
- Boris Kokovkin
- Gennadiy Michurin
- Vladimir Druzhnikov
- Yuriy Tolubeev
- Lev Frichinsky
- Nina Grebeshkova
- Vasiliy Merkurev
- Klavdiya Khabarova

== Bibliography ==
- Rollberg, Peter. Historical Dictionary of Russian and Soviet Cinema. Scarecrow Press, 2008.
