= Przhevalsky (film) =

- Russian: Пржевальский
- Directed by: Sergei Yutkevich
- Written by: Aleksei Speshnev; Vladimir Shveytser
- Starring: Sergei Papov; Vsevolod Larionov; Boris Tenin; Nikolai Svobodin; Sergey Martinson
- Cinematography: Yevgeny Andrikanis
- Music by: Georgy Sviridov
- Release date: 1951
- Running time: 115 minutes
- Country: Soviet Union
- Language: Russian

Przhevalsky (Russian: Пржевальский) is a 1951 Soviet biographical drama film directed by Sergei Yutkevich.

== Plot ==
The film tells about the famous Russian traveler Nikolay Przhevalsky, who headed the expedition to the Ussuri region and four scientific expeditions to Central Asia. He described its nature, discovered a huge number of ridges, lakes, and rivers, and organized a collection of various collections of plants and animals.

== Cast ==
- Sergei Papov as Nikolay Przhevalsky
- Vsevolod Larionov as Vsevolod Roborovsky
- Boris Tenin as cossack Yegorov
- Nikolai Komissarov as Pyotr Semyonov-Tyan-Shansky
- Vladimir Vsevolodov as Nikolai Severtsov
- Nikolai Svobodin as Grand Duke
- Sergey Martinson as professor Shatilo, Geographical Society treasurer
- Vladimir Taskin as Benjamin Disraeli
- Sergei Tsenin as Russian ambassador
