= Nikolai Svobodin =

Soviet actor

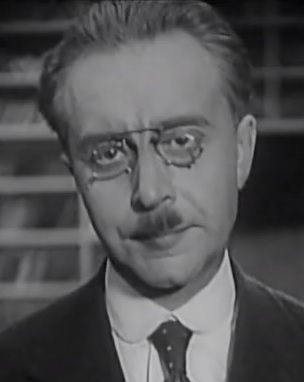
- Born: Nikolai Kapitonovich Pechkin; 20 May 1898; Uzmorye village, Novouzensky Uyezd, Samara Governorate, Russian Empire
- Died: 20 September 1965 (aged 67); Moscow, Soviet Union
- Occupations: Actor, theater pedagogue
- Years active: 1934–1965

Nikolai Kapitonovich Svobodin (Russian: Николай Капитонович Свободин; 20 May 1898 – 20 September 1965) was a Soviet and Russian stage and film actor and theater pedagogue.

== Personal life ==
He was born in village Uzmorye, Novouzensky Uyezd as Nikolai Kapitonovich Pechkin (Russian: Печкин). He became a member of Moscow Art Theatre in 1938. He taught at Lunacharsky State Institute for Theatre Arts from 1934 to 1941, and at Gerasimov Institute of Cinematography from 1963 to 1964.

He died in Moscow, and was buried in the Novodevichy Cemetery.

== Filmography ==
- The Lonely White Sail (1937) as Master of the world
- Lenin in October (1937) as Valerian Rutkovsky, socialist revolutionary
- Lenin in 1918 (1939) as Valerian Rutkovsky
- The Great Glinka (1946) as Baron Yegor Fyodorovich Rosen
- The Court of Honor (1948) as Professor Sergei Fyodorovich Losev
- Secret Mission (1950) as German industrialist
- Przhevalsky (1951) as Grand Duke
- Admiral Ushakov (1953) as Mordovtsev
- Attack from the Sea (1953) as Mordovtsev
- Resurrection (1960) as Retired colonel, juror
- Northern Story (1960) as Colonel Kiselyov

== Awards and honors ==
- Order of the Red Banner of Labour (1948)
- Stalin Prize, 1st class (1949) – for his performance as professor Losev in The Court of Honor
- People's Artist of the RSFSR (1954)
- Medal "For Valiant Labour in the Great Patriotic War 1941–1945"
- Medal "In Commemoration of the 800th Anniversary of Moscow"
