= Yevgeny Andrikanis =

Soviet cameraman and filmmaker

Yevgeny Nikolayevich Andrikanis (Russian: Евге́ний Никола́евич Андрика́нис; 27 December 1909 – 19 December 1993) was a Soviet cameraman, director and screenwriter. He was also known as a front-line cameraman during the Great Patriotic War. Andrikanis received the title of People's Artist of the RSFSR in 1982 and Lenin Prize in 1978.

== Biography ==
Andrikanis was born in Paris into a family of Russian immigrants. His father, Nikolai Adamovich Andrikanis, was a lawyer, and his mother, Yekaterina Pavlovna Schmidt, was a relative of Nikolai Pavlovich Schmidt. Andrikanis received secondary education in Moscow, where his family moved back to in 1916. Upon graduating from school in 1928, he worked at the Sovkino filming studio as an assistant to cameraman. Simultaneously, he studied at the cameraman's department of the Gerasimov Institute of Cinematography. He graduated from the university in 1932 and spent a year in the Red Army.

Andrikanis began to work at the Mosfilm studio in 1933. He took part in filming Dreamers (1934), Cosmic Voyage (1936) and The Generation of Winners (1936). His first major work as a cinematographer was Mashenka released n 1942.

In 1942–1944, he worked as a front-line cameraman on the Voronezh Front and Normandy.

Andrikanis became a member of the Communist Party of the Soviet Union in 1968. He was also a member of the USSR Union of Journalists and USSR Union of Cinematographers.

Andrikanis died in Moscow, eight days before his 84th birthday. He is buried in the Preobrazhenskoye Cemetery in Moscow.

== Personal life ==
Andrikanis was married twice. His daughter from the first marriage, Tatyana Lavrova, was an actress. He had another daughter from his second marriage with Galina Zakharova.

== Partial filmography ==
=== Cinematographer ===
- 1937 - Gavrosh
- 1938 - Peat-Bog Soldiers [Russian: Bolotnye soldaty]
- 1941 - First cavalry [Russian: Pervaya konnaya]
- 1944 - Days and Nights [Russian: Dni i nochi]
- 1944 - The Moscow Sky [Russian: Nebo Moskvy]
- 1948 - Three Encounters [Russian: Tri vstrechi]
- 1951 - Przhevalsky
- 1953 - The Great Warrior Skanderbeg [Russian: Velikiy voin Albanii Skanderbeg]
- 1955 - Othello
- 1957 - Stories About Lenin [Russian: Rasskazy o Lenine], Pardesi

=== Director ===
- 1960 - Northern Story [Russian: Severnaya povest]
- 1965 - Killed at Dawn [Russian: Kazneny na rassvete]
