= Alexander Stein =

Soviet writer

- Александр Петрович Штейн
- Born: Aleksandr Petrovich Rubinshtein; 28 September 1906; Samarkand, Russian Empire
- Died: 5 October 1993 (aged 87); Moscow, Russian Federation
- Occupations: Playwright; scriptwriter; memoirist; journalist
- Years active: 1920-1980s
- Spouse: Lyudmila Putiyevskaya (1912–94)
- Awards: Order of the Patriotic War; Order of the Red Star; Order of the Red Banner of Labour

Alexander Petrovich Stein (Russian: Алекса́ндр Петро́вич Штейн, romanized: Aleksandr Petrovich Shtein; born Rubinstein/Rubinshtein/Рубинште́йн, 28 September 1906 – 5 October 1993) was a Soviet Russian writer, playwright, scriptwriter and memoirist. Alexander Stein was a recipient of several high-profile state awards, including the Order of the Patriotic War, the Order of the Red Star and the Order of the Red Banner of Labour (twice), as well as two Stalin Prizes (1949, 1951).

== Biography ==
Alexander Petrovich Rubinstein was born in Samarkand, Russian Empire (now Uzbekistan) to a middle-class Jewish family. In the early 1920s, as a member of the Samarkand Special Purpose Forces battalion, he took part in fighting the White Army, for the establishment of the Soviet power in the Central Asia. In Bukhara, he started contributing to a local military paper, then wrote for the newspapers Pravda Vostoka (1920–1923) and (after a one-year stint at Petrograd University) Leningradskaya Pravda (1924–1929). In 1930–1939 Stein (now a Soviet Communist Party member) edited Rabochy i Teatr (Worker and Theatre) magazine.

=== Literary career ===
In 1929 Alexander Stein published his debut play Oil, co-authored by the Tur brothers. It was followed by Utopia (1930) and The Talent (1936). In 1934 he became the member of the Soviet Union of Writers.

In 1941–1946 Stein worked first as a senior politruk on board the battleship Oktyabrskaya Revolyutsya, then as a battalion commissar and the editor the Soviet Navy newspaper Oktyabrsky Luch (October Beam). All through the Siege of Leningrad he stayed in the starving city, as a special correspondent for the Krasny Flot newspaper.

After the War Stein continued writing, his plays Admiral's Flag (1950, Stalin Prize in 1951), The Ocean (1961), Applause (1967) and autobiographical Once There Was Me (1977) rated among his best. Some of his works caused controversy. He wrote Admiral Ushakov and Attack from the Sea (1953 films). Prologue originally featured a scene involving Stalin in his youth, which was withdrawn by the author in 1955, after the Soviet leader's death. Law of Honour (1948, the Stalin Prize) supported the so-called anti-cosmopolitism campaign. Between the Showers (1964) was criticized in Pravda for portraying Vladimir Lenin as a schematic, lifeless figure.

In 1957 Stein started editing the Teatr magazine. In his later years he published several acclaimed books of memoirs, including How Plots Come into Life (1964), The Second Entracte (1975), Skies in Diamonds (1976) and Alone With the Audience (1982).

Alexander Stein died on 5 October 1993. He was buried at the Vagankovskoye Cemetery in Moscow.
