= Northern Story =

- Russian poster
- Russian: Северная повесть
- Directed by: Yevgeny Andrikanis
- Written by: Yevgeny Andrikanis; Konstantin Paustovsky
- Starring: Oleg Strizhenov; Ieva Mūrniece; Valentin Zubkov; Gennady Yudin; Nikolai Svobodin
- Cinematography: Semyon Sheynin
- Music by: Anatoly Alexandrov
- Release date: 1960
- Running time: 77 minutes
- Country: Soviet Union
- Language: Russian

Northern Story (Russian: Северная повесть) is a 1960 Soviet historical romance drama film directed by Yevgeny Andrikanis.

== Plot ==
The film takes place on the eve of the Decembrist revolt in 1825. The film tells about officer Pavel Bestuzhev, who is sent into exile in the garrison in the North. There he meets the wounded Decembrist, who is trying to leave Russia. Pavel decides to help him.

== Cast ==
- Oleg Strizhenov as Pavel Bestuzhev
- Ieva Mūrniece as Anna Jakobsen / Maria Jakobsen
- Valentin Zubkov as Tikhonov
- Gennady Yudin as Shchedrin, Decembrist
- Nikolai Svobodin as Colonel Kiselyov
- Viktor Kulakov as Merk
- Georgi Chernovolenko as Anna's father
- Aleksandr Kutepov as Lobov
