= The Composer Glinka =

1952 film by Grigori Aleksandrov

The Composer Glinka (Kompozitor Glinka)
- Directed by: Grigori Aleksandrov
- Starring: Boris Smirnov; Lev Durasov; Lyubov Orlova; Yuri Lyubimov; Georgy Vitsin
- Cinematography: Eduard Tisse
- Music by: Vladimir Shcherbachov; Vissarion Shebalin
- Production company: Mosfilm
- Release date: 1 October 1952
- Country: Soviet Union
- Language: Russian

Kompozitor Glinka (Russian: Композитор Глинка; English literal translation, Composer Glinka; American release title Man of Music) is a 1952 Soviet biographical film directed by Grigori Aleksandrov.

== Plot ==
The young composer Mikhail Glinka performs his new work at a soiree at Count Vielgorsky's house. However, the public is accustomed to Western music, and reacts coldly to the creation of the composer. The disappointed Glinka decides to go learn the art of music in Italy.

After returning from Italy, he is full of desire to write a Russian opera. Vasily Zhukovsky proposes a subject: an exploit of Ivan Susanin. Tsar Nicholas I changes the name of the opera to A Life for the Tsar and assigns a librettist - Baron Georg von Rosen.

When Glinka meets him, he is shocked: Rosen speaks Russian with a noticeable German accent. The premiere is successful, but Glinka is still not entirely happy with the libretto: "Rosen wrote the wrong words".

When the tsar learns that Glinka's opera Ruslan and Lyudmila is based on a subject by Pushkin, he sees it as sedition. This is a bitter experience for Glinka, but he is comforted by the support of "the progressive Russian people."

== Cast ==
- Boris Smirnov as Mikhail Glinka
- Lev Durasov as Alexander Pushkin
- Lyubov Orlova as Lyudmila Glinka
- Yury Lyubimov as Alexander Dargomyzhsky
- Georgy Vitsin as Nikolai Gogol
- Konstantin Nassonov as Vasily Zhukovsky
- Igor Litovkin as Alexander Griboyedov
- Andrei Popov as Vladimir Stasov
- Yuri Yurovsky as prince Mikhail Vielgorsky
- Sergei Vecheslov as Vladimir Odoyevsky
- Sviatoslav Richter as Franz Liszt
- Bella Vinogradova as Giuditta Pasta
- Alexander Sashin-Nikolsky as Dmitry Petrov
- Mikhail Nazvanov as Nicholas I of Russia
- Irina Likso as Empress Alexandra Feodorovna
- Pavel Pavlenko as Thaddeus Bulgarin
- Vladimir Saveliev as Karl Ivanovich
- Faina Shevchenko as wife of Karl Ivanovich
- Rina Zelyonaya as general's wife
- Radner Muratov as bellhop in the theater
- Gennady Yudin as Hector Berlioz
- Anatoly Papanov as adjutant of the Grand Duke
- Sergei Kurilov as Karl Bryullov

== Awards ==
1953 Locarno International Film Festival

- Won: Golden Leopard
