= Ivan Pereverzev =

Soviet actor (1914–1978)

- Иван Переверзев
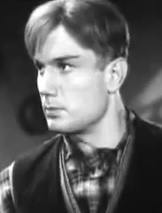
- Pereverzev in 1941
- Born: Ivan Fyodorovich Pereverzev; 3 September 1914; Kuzminka, Oryol Governorate, Russian Empire
- Died: 23 April 1978 (aged 63); Moscow, Soviet Union
- Occupation: Actor
- Years active: 1933–1978

Ivan Fyodorovich Pereverzev (Russian: Ива́н Фёдорович Переве́рзев; 3 September 1914 – 23 April 1978) was a Soviet and Russian stage and film actor. People's Artist of the USSR (1975).

From his relationship with the actress Alla Larionova, he had a daughter, Alyona.

== Filmography ==
- The Conveyor of Death (1933) – episode (uncredited)
- The Private Life of Pyotr Vinogradov (1934) – fitness instructor (uncredited)
- My Love (1940) – Grisha
- Ivan Nikulin: Russian Sailor (1944) – Ivan Nikulin
- It Happened in the Donbas (1945) – Stepan Andreyevich Ryabinin
- The First Glove (1946) – Nikita Krutikov
- The Third Blow (1948) – Yakov Kreizer
- The Court of Honor (1948) – Ivan Ivanovich Petrenko
- Dream of a Cossack (1950) – Andrei Petrovich Boichenko
- Far from Moscow (1950) – engineer (uncredited)
- Taras Shevchenko (1951) – Zygmunt Sierakowski
- Sadko (1952) – Timofey Larionovich
- Admiral Ushakov (1953) – Fyodor Ushakov
- Attack from the Sea (1953) – Fyodor Ushakov
- Heroes of Shipka (1954) – Katorgin
- The Variegateds Case (1958) – "Stranger" the spy
- My Beloved (1958) – Kozyrev
- The Sky Beckons (1959) – Yevgeny Kornev
- Michman Panin (1960) – Ivan Grigoryev
- Scarlet Sails (1961) – Longren
- Silence (1963) – Lukovsky
- Meet Baluyev! (1963) – Pavel Gavrilovich Baluyev
- The Enchanted Desna (1964) – construction manager
- Strong with Spirit (1967) – Dmitry Medvedev
- The New Adventures of the Elusive Avengers (1968) – Smirnov, Red Cavalry Army chief of staff
- Trembita (1968) – Prokop, Mikola's father
- Dangerous Tour (1969) – Kazimir Kazimirovich Kulbras, general governor
- Bonivur's Heart (1969) – Zhilin, old peasant
- Liberation (1970) – Vasily Chuikov
- The Crown of the Russian Empire, or Once Again the Elusive Avengers (1971) – Smirnov, chief of JSPD
- Adventures in a City that Does Not Exist (1974) – Long John Silver
- A Very English Murder (1974) – Briggs, butler (voiced by Yevgeny Vesnik)
- Front Without Flanks (1975) – father Pavel
- Front Beyond the Front Line (1977) – father Pavel

== Awards and honors ==
- Medal "For Valiant Labour in the Great Patriotic War 1941–1945" (1946)
- Order of the Badge of Honour (1950)
- Honored Artist of the RSFSR (1951)
- Stalin Prize, 1st class (1952)
- People's Artist of the RSFSR (1966)
- Order of the Red Banner of Labour (1974)
- People's Artist of the USSR (1975)

== Personal life ==
First wife was Nadezhda Illarionovna Cherednichenko, they had son Sergey. With Maria Skobtseva they had son Vasiliy. Grandson - Sergey.
