= Oleg Popov =

Clown

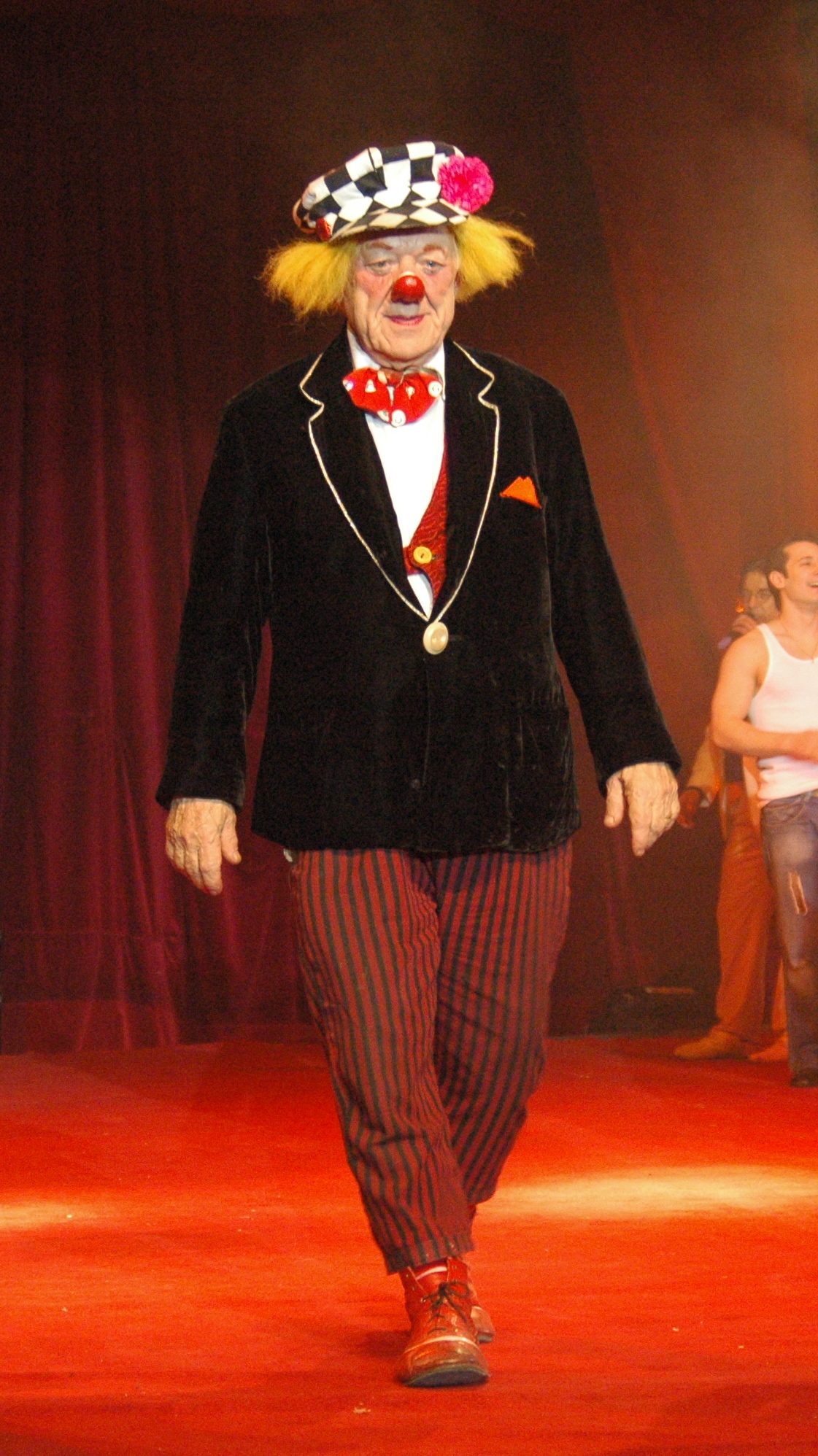
- Popov performing with the Russian State Circus, Worms, Germany, 28 March 2009
- Born: 31 July 1930; Vyrubovo, Moscow Oblast, RSFSR, Soviet Union
- Died: 2 November 2016 (aged 86); Rostov-on-Don, Russia
- Occupations: Clown, mime, circus artist
- Years active: 1951–2016
- Known for: "The Sunshine Clown"
- Spouse(s): Alexandra Popova (1952–90; her death); 1 child Gabriela Popova (m. 1991)
- Children: 1
- Awards: People's Artist of the USSR (1969)

Oleg Konstantinovich Popov (Russian: Олег Константинович Попoв, 31 July 1930 – 2 November 2016) was a Soviet and Russian clown and circus artist. He was awarded People's Artist of the USSR in 1969.

== Early life ==
Popov was born on 31 July 1930, the son of a clock-repairman. At age 12, he began working as an apprentice typographer for the newspaper Pravda, and he later joined Pravda's Athletic Club. There, in 1945, someone suggested that he apply for Moscow's State College of Circus and Variety Arts (better known as the "Moscow Circus School"). He was accepted and studied acrobatics, juggling, and other circus skills there, graduating in 1949. He made his debut in 1952 at the Tbilisi Circus in the Georgian SSR. Afterwards, he continued his career at the Moscow Circus on Tsvetnoy Boulevard (today Circus Nikulin).

In 1955, Popov performed abroad for the first time, in Warsaw, and the following year, he toured with the Moscow Circus in France, Belgium, and England. He was immediately noticed by the press, which made him a circus star. The Soviet regime quickly built on his success abroad and transformed him into a goodwill ambassador for the Soviet Union. He appeared at the Brussels World Fair in 1958 and was broadcast from Moscow on American television in 1957. He toured the United States in 1963 and 1972 with the Moscow Circus. In 1969, Popov was honored with the title of People's Artist of the USSR. He toured extensively around the world in subsequent years with the Moscow Circus. In Australia, he was named King of Moomba (1971).

== Career ==
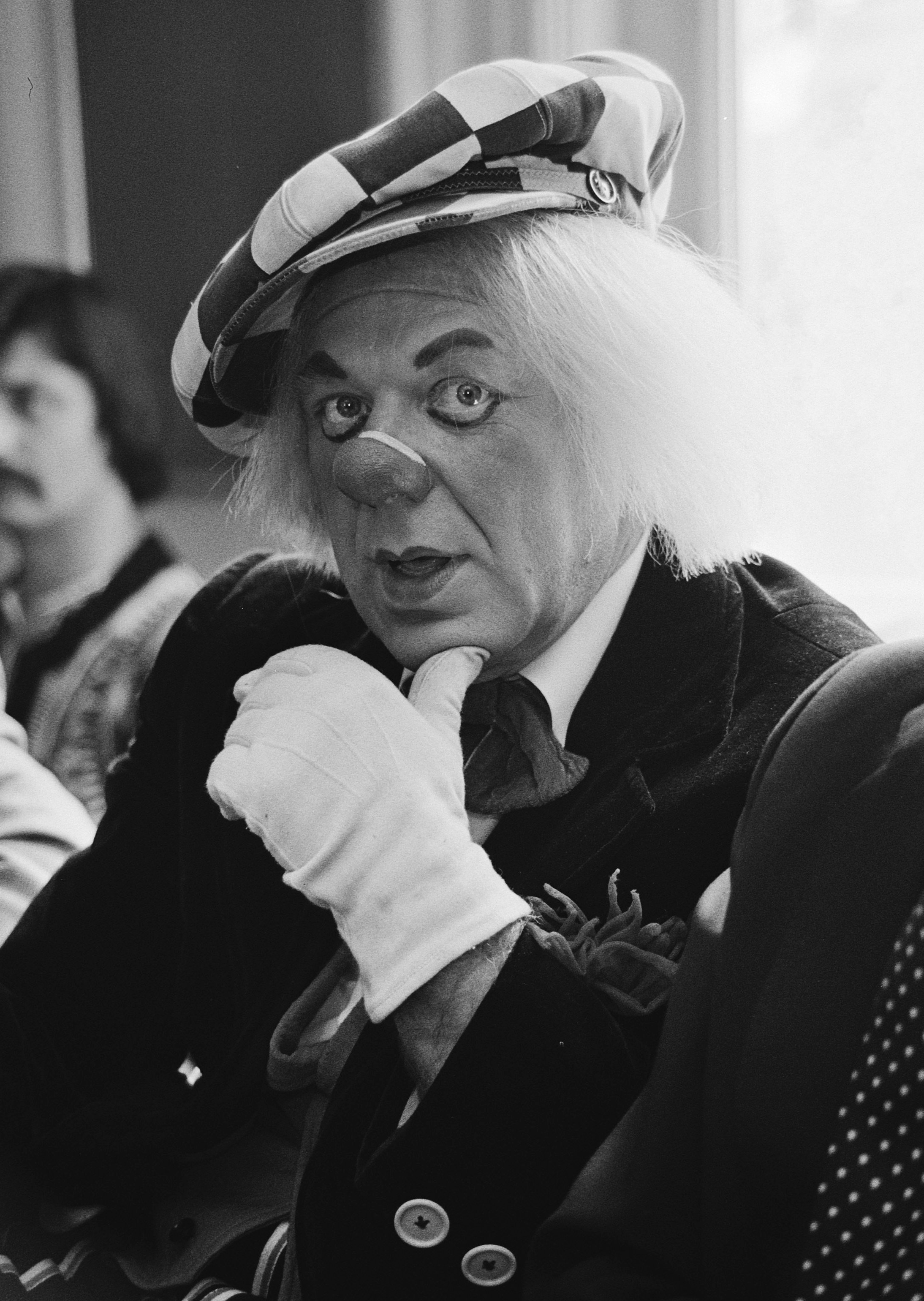
Popov in 1979

Popov performed as a clown, combining his talents as a mime, a tightrope walker, and a juggler. At the 8th International Circus Festival of Monte-Carlo in 1981, he received the coveted Golden Clown award as a tribute to his stellar career. His clown character followed the tradition of the Russian folk character "Ivanushka" (Ivan the Fool).

In the early 1990s, after the fall of the Soviet Union, he toured with a unit of the Moscow Circus in Germany for a number of years, where he eventually settled. He later performed extensively in Germany, in circus shows, on television, or with his own touring show. He married Gabriela Lehmann, a German circus performer in 1991. She was 32 years younger. In 2006, Popov was invited to perform at the 30th anniversary of the International Circus Festival of Monte Carlo. Aged 75 years of age, he received a standing ovation.

In 2015, he returned for the first time to Russia after 28 years' of living in Germany; it was at the First "Master" gala event (the Russian circus equivalent of the Academy Awards ceremony) at the Sochi State Circus, where he was given a long standing ovation. The Russian Minister of Culture, Vladimir Medinsky read a welcoming message from President Vladimir Putin. In December 2015 he was one of the judges at the final show of "The Blue Bird" contest—a young talent competition on the Russia-1 television channel.

Popov appeared in four films, Ring of Daring (1953), Ma-ma (1976), The Blue Bird (1976), and Rytsar bez dospekhov (Poland, 1966). He published a book of memoirs in 1967, which has been widely translated into numerous languages including English (as "Russian Clown", 1970). From a first marriage with a violinist, Alexandra, Oleg Popov had a daughter, Olga (born 1953).

Popov died on 2 November 2016, aged 86, from a cardiac arrest while on tour, at a hotel in Rostov-on-Don.

== Awards and honors ==
- Honored Artist of the RSFSR (1956)
- People's Artist of the RSFSR (1958)
- People's Artist of the USSR (1969)
- Order of Lenin (1980)
- Three Orders of the Red Banner of Labour
- Honorary prize Clown d'or of the International Circus Festival in Monte Carlo (1981)
- Order of Friendship (1994) - for services to the people associated with the development of the Russian statehood, achievements in work, science, culture, arts, strengthening of friendship and cooperation between the peoples
- Honorary Diploma of the President of the Russian Federation (2010) – for his merits in the development of circus art and many years of creative work
- Asteroid 278200 Olegpopov, discovered by German amateur astronomer Rolf Apitzsch in 2007, was named in his honor. The official naming citation was published by the Minor Planet Center on 6 April 2012 (M.P.C. 79108).
