= The Court of Honor =

1948 Soviet film directed by Abram Room

- Russian: Суд чести
- Directed by: Abram Room
- Written by: Aleksandr Shtein
- Starring: Boris Chirkov; Antonina Maksimova; Evgeniy Samoylov; Nikolai Annenkov; Olga Zhizneva
- Cinematography: Aleksandr Galperin
- Edited by: T. Zinchuk
- Music by: Lev Shvarts
- Release date: 1948
- Running time: 100 minute
- Country: Soviet Union

The Court of Honor (Russian: Суд чести) is a 1948 Soviet biographical drama film directed by Abram Room.

== Plot ==
Soviet scientists-biochemists Losev and Dobrotvorsky made a scientific discovery that allowed one to effectively fight against pain. They went on a scientific trip to the United States, where, they shared the results of their research with Americans who they thought were colleagues, but who actually were businessmen and spies. While still in the U.S., they also published an article about uncompleted work of their team. Upon their return to the Soviet Union, the scientists were criticized for their actions in the United States. They defended themselves, insisting that "science has no boundaries" and that knowledge should belong to all mankind. Dobrotvorsky was strongly condemned by his wife, who was outraged by his "ideological immaturity." As a result of their actions, the scientists were convicted of cosmopolitanism and punished by a court of honor. Dobrotvorsky repented of his act.

== Cast ==
- Boris Chirkov as Academician Andrey Vereysky
- Antonina Maksimova as Olga
- Evgeniy Samoylov as Nikolay
- Nikolai Annenkov as Prof. Aleksandr Dobrotvorsky
- Olga Zhizneva as Dr. Tatyana Dobrotvorskaya
- Nikolai Svobodin as Prof. Sergey Losev
- Lidiya Sukharevskaya as Nina Loseva
- Vasili Makarov as Kirillov
- Ivan Pereverzev as Ivan Petrenko
