= Wolves and Sheep (film) =

- Directed by: Vladimir Sukhobokov
- Written by: Alexander Ostrovsky (play)
- Starring: Vera Pashennaya; Igor Ilyinsky; Tatyana Yeremeyeva
- Cinematography: Vladimir Rapoport
- Music by: Vissarion Shebalin
- Production company: Gorky Film Studios
- Release date: 26 January 1953
- Running time: 183 minutes
- Country: Soviet Union
- Language: Russian

Wolves and Sheep (Russian: Волки и овцы, romanized: Volki i ovtsy) is a 1953 Soviet comedy-drama film directed by Vladimir Sukhobokov and starring Vera Pashennaya, Igor Ilyinsky and Tatyana Yeremeyeva. It is based on the 1875 play Wolves and Sheep by Aleksandr Ostrovskiy.

== Cast ==
- Vera Pashennaya as Murzavetskaya
- Igor Ilyinsky as Appolon Murzavetsky
- Tatyana Yeremeyeva as Glafira Alexeyevna
- Yelena Shatrova as Kupavina
- Varvara Ryzhova as Anfisa Tikhonovna
- Vladimir Vladislavsky
- Vladimir Golovin

== Bibliography ==
- Prominent Personalities in the USSR. Scarecrow Press, 1968.
