= Taras Shevchenko (film) =

- Directed by: Igor Savchenko
- Written by: Igor Savchenko
- Starring: Sergei Bondarchuk; Ivan Pereverzev; Yevgeny Samoylov
- Music by: Boris Lyatoshinsky
- Production company: Dovzhenko Film Studios
- Release date: 1951
- Running time: 118 minutes
- Country: Soviet Union
- Languages: Russian; Ukrainian

Taras Shevchenko (Russian: and Ukrainian: «Тарас Шевченко») is a 1951 Soviet biopic about the Ukrainian writer Taras Shevchenko, written and directed by Igor Savchenko. The New York Times praised the acting of Sergei Bondarchuk.

== Synopsis ==
Summer 1841. Lermontov is killed. The news of this arrives to a modest attic of the Saint Petersburg Academy of Arts, where the young artist and poet Taras Shevchenko lives and works. Growing up in a Ukrainian peasant family, knowing all hardships of serf life, Shevchenko in the years of study clearly identifies the meaning of true art, which is to serve the interests of the people.

After graduating from the Academy, Shevchenko goes to Ukraine. The poems of Taras are imbued with love for the common people. Landowner-nationalists, liberal leaders of the Cyril and Methodius Brotherhood, try to "tame" the famous poet, but Shevchenko forever has made his choice; he is on the side of the people, their defender and crooner. The fiery freedom-loving creativity of Taras Shevchenko is known throughout Russia.

Nicholas I exiles the poet to the distant Caspian fort where he is to serve as an ordinary soldier and is banned from writing or drawing. In the poet's difficult days he has the support of Ukrainian soldier Skobelev, Polish revolutionary Serakovsky, captain Kosarev and the major of the fortress, Uskov.

For the sake of his release Chernyshevsky and Dobrolyubov are hard at work. And so, the sick and aged Shevchenko is finally free. Together with Chernyshevsky and Dobrolyubov, he dreams of a bright future of the motherland, when the Russian and Ukrainian peoples throw off the chains of slavery.

== Awards ==
Sergei Bondarchuk won the Stalin Prize and the Best Actor Award at the Karlovy Vary International Film Festival for his acting.

== Cast ==
- Sergei Bondarchuk as Taras Shevchenko
- Vladimir Chestnokov as Nikolay Chernyshevsky
- Nikolai Timofeyev as Nikolay Dobrolyubov
- Hnat Yura as Mikhail Shchepkin
- Ivan Pereverzev as Zygmunt Sierakowski
- Yevgeny Samoylov as Nikolay Speshnev
- Lavrenty Masokha as Mykola Kostomarov
- Pavel Shpringfeld as Panteleimon Kulish
- Aleksey Konsovsky as Vladimir Kurochkin
- Grigory Shpigel as Karl Bryullov
- Mikhail Nazvanov as Nicholas I of Russia
- Mark Bernes as captain Kosarev
- Dmitri Milyutenko as major Uskov
- Marianna Strizhenova as Agafia Uskova
- Mikhail Kuznetsov as soldier Skobelev
- Natalia Uzhviy as Yarina Shevchenko
- Mikhail Troyanovsky as chief of gendarmes
- Alexander Khvylya as Lord Barabash
- Garen Zhukovskaya as Lady Barabash
- Mikhail Vysotsky as Yevdokim Appolonovich Lukashevich
- Gennady Yudin as agitator
- Leonid Kmit as staff captain Obryadin
- Aleksandr Baranov as Potapov
- Konstantin Sorokin as ginger corporal
- Vladimir Soshalsky as ensign Nikolai Mombelli, Shevchenko's friend
- Latif Fayziyev as Kyrgyz
- Stanislav Chekan as cabby
- Stepan Shkurat as serf bandura player
- Dmitry Kapka as priest
- Vyacheslav Tikhonov as representative of the Petersburg youth
- Ivan Savkin as representative of the Petersburg youth
- Marina Ladynina as Countess Pototskaya
- Nikolai Grinko as serf-rebel
- Vladimir Troshin as serf-rebel
- Anatoly Chemodurov as student
- Oleg Golubitsky as student
- Vsevolod Sanayev as episode
