= Nina Grebeshkova =

Russian actress (1930–2025)

- Нина Гребешкова
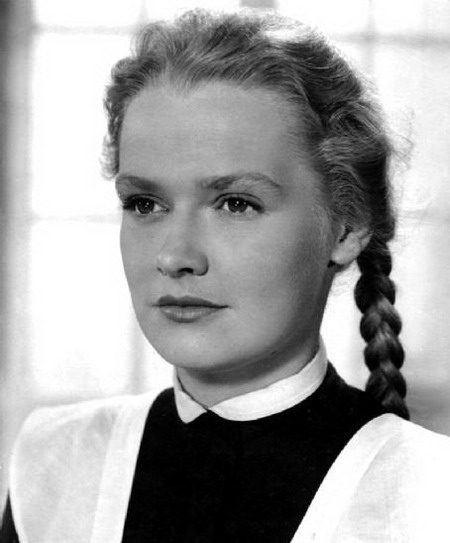
- Grebeshkova in A Comrade's Honour (1953)
- Born: 29 November 1930; Moscow, Russian SFSR, Soviet Union
- Died: 10 May 2025 (aged 94); Moscow, Russia
- Resting place: Kuntsevo Cemetery
- Citizenship: Russia
- Occupation: Actress
- Years active: 1950–2025
- Spouse: Leonid Gaidai
- Children: 1

Signature
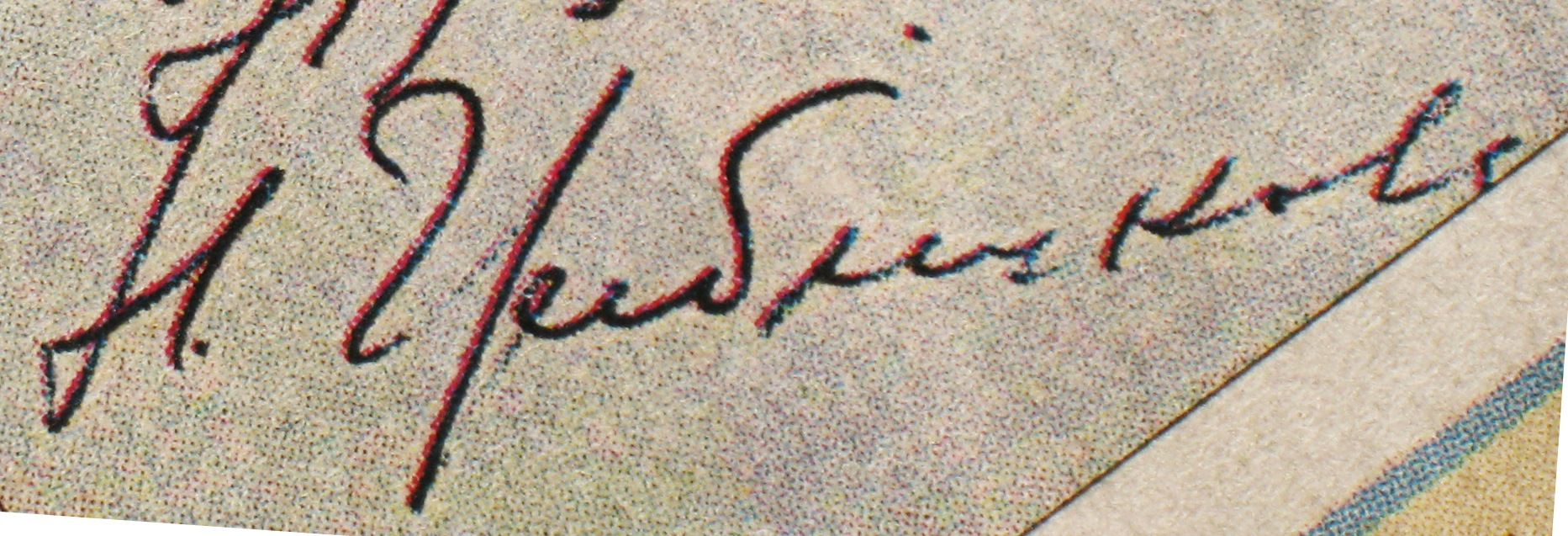

Nina Pavlovna Grebeshkova (Russian: Нина Павловна Гребешкова; 29 November 1930 – 10 May 2025) was a Russian actress, who was married to film director Leonid Gaidai. Over the years of her creative activity, she played more than eighty roles in films (mostly supporting).

== Biography ==
In 1954, graduated from Gerasimov Institute of Cinematography (workshop of Vladimir Belokurov and Vasili Vanin).

From 1954 to 1990, she was an actress of the National Film Actors' Theatre.

Grebeshkova died on 10 May 2025, at the age of 94. She was buried at the Kuntsevo Cemetery next to her husband Leonid Gaidai.

== Selected filmography ==
Film
| Year | Title | Role | Notes |
|---|---|---|---|
| 2016 | Flight Crew (Экипаж) | passenger business-class | |
| 2013 | Legend № 17 (Легенда №17) | neighbor | |
| 1999 | The Admirer (Поклонник) | false grandmother | |
| 1995 | Heads and Tails | hospital patient | |
| 1989 | Private Detective, or Operation Cooperation (Частный детектив, или Операция Кооперация) | Anna Petrovna Pukhova | |
| 1985 | Dangerous for Your Life! (Опасно для жизни!) | Zinaida Petrovna | |
| 1982 | Tears Were Falling (Слёзы капали) | Galkina | |
| 1982 | Sportloto-82 (Спортлото-82) | aunt Klava | |
| 1980 | Borrowing Matchsticks (За спичками) | wife Hyuvyarinen | |
| 1975 | It Can't Be! (Не может быть!) | Anna, the wife Gorbushkin | |
| 1971 | The Twelve Chairs (12 стульев) | Musik; queen Tamara | |
| 1968 | The Diamond Arm (Бриллиантовая рука) | Nadezhda Ivanovna, the wife Gorbunkov | |
| 1968 | We'll Live Till Monday (Доживём до понедельника) | Allochka | |
| 1967 | Kidnapping, Caucasian Style (Кавказская пленница, или Новые приключения Шурика) | first aid nurse | |
| 1964 | A Tale of Lost Times (Сказка о потерянном времени) | Marya Sergeevna | |
| 1950 | Brave People (Смелые люди) | graduate school | |
