= Mysterious Discovery =

1953 film by Boriss Bunejev

- Directed by: Boris Buneev
- Written by: Valentina Spirina
- Produced by: Boris Krakowski
- Starring: Aleksey Alekseev; Igor Bezyayev; Nikolay Grabbe; Mikhail Gluzsky; Aleksei Gribov
- Cinematography: Gavriil Egiazarov
- Edited by: Yevgenia Abdirkina
- Music by: Vladimir Mikhailovich Yurovsky
- Production company: Gorky Film Studios
- Release date: 1953
- Running time: 72 minutes
- Country: Soviet Union
- Language: Russian

Mysterious Discovery (Russian: Таинственная находка) is a 1953 Soviet family adventure film directed by Boris Buneev.

The film tells how a group of schoolchildren in a remote Arctic village embarks on an expedition to learn about a local hero, discovering the power of friendship and perseverance as they honor his legacy of bravery during the Crimean War.

== Plot ==
In the Arctic settlement of Rybachy, a group of schoolchildren discovers an old rifle, inspiring them to organize an expedition to learn about the life of local folk hero Guriy Gagarka.

During the Crimean War, Gagarka sacrificed his life to ground an English frigate, enabling the local militia to rally and repel an English landing force. His actions were later commemorated by local partisans during the Great Patriotic War.

The challenges the students face during their journey strengthen their friendship. Guided by their new history teacher, Yekaterina Sergeyevna, and their scout leader, Anton, the class fulfills their promise to the crew of the trawler *Slavny* by completing the school year with excellent grades.

== Cast ==
In alphabetical order

- Aleksey Alekseev as Stepan Golovin
- Igor Bezyayev as Nikanor Sarvanov
- B. Dorochov as Andrei
- Mikhail Gluzsky as Segey Chernyshev
- Nikolay Grabbe as British lieutenant
- Valentin Grachyov as Vasia Golovin
- Aleksei Gribov as Nikanor Sarvanov
- Georgi Gumilevsky as Prokhor Brusnichkin
- Larisa Matvienko as Gagarka's wife
- Andrei Petrov as Aleksei Golovin
- Alexandr Pokrovsky as Stepa Brusnichkin
- Aleksei Pokrovsky as episode
- Nikolai Rybnikov as Sailor
- Ekaterina Savinova as Ekaterina Sotnikova
- A. Shmurakova as Luda
- Nikolay Smorchkov as Sailor
- Aleksandr Susnin as Anton
- Yevgeny Teterin as British captain
- Andrei Tsimbal as Geologist
- Yan Yanakiyev as Sailor
- Gennadi Yudin as Guriy Gagarka

== Bibliography ==
- Natalja Čemodanova / Alfred Krautz. International Directory of Cinematographers, Set-And Costume Designers in Film: Soviet Union. Saur, 1995.
