= Gennady Yudin =

Soviet and Russian actor

- Born: Gennady Petrovich Yudin; 27 March 1923; Moscow, Soviet Union
- Died: 13 November 1989 (aged 66); Moscow, Soviet Union
- Occupation: Actor

Gennady Petrovich Yudin (Russian: Геннадий Петрович Юдин; 27 March 1923, Moscow – 13 November 1989, Moscow) was a Soviet and Russian stage and film actor. Laureate of Stalin Prize (1951).

== Filmography ==
- The Russian Question (1947) as Parker
- Encounter at the Elbe (1949) as Kurt Dietrich
- They Have a Motherland (1950) as Kurt Kraus
- Taras Shevchenko (1951) as Agitator
- The Composer Glinka (1951) as Hector Berlioz
- Admiral Ushakov (1953) as Capt. Dmitry Senyavin
- Attack from the Sea (1953) as Capt. Dmitry Senyavin
- Silvery Dust (1953) as Dick Jones
- Mysterious Discovery (1954) as Guriy Gagarka
- The Frigid Sea (1955) as Crewman Stepan Shaparov
- Murder on Dante Street (1956) as actor, partner of Madlen
- Carnival Night (1956) as Jazz band Conductor
- A Lesson in History (1957) as Henrik Lange, worker-communist
- Vasily Surikov (1959) as Lunyov
- Northern Story (1960) as Shchedrin
- Hussar Ballad (1962) as Shura's commanding officer
- Spring on the Oder (1968) as Sereda
- Waterloo (1970) as Grenadier Chactas
- Destiny (1977) as german military doctor
