= Vera Pashennaya =

Russian actress

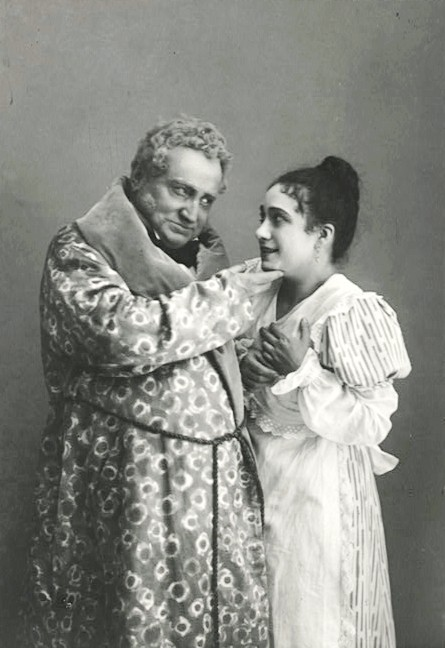
- Vera Pashennaya with Alexander Yuzhin
- Born: Vera Nikolayevna Pashennaya; 19 September 1887; Moscow, Russian Empire
- Died: 28 October 1962 (aged 75); Moscow, Soviet Union
- Education: Moscow Theatrical School
- Occupations: Actress, theater pedagogue
- Years active: 1907–1961

Vera Nikolayevna Pashennaya (Russian: Вера Николаевна Пашенная; 19 September 1887, Moscow – 28 October 1962, Moscow) was a Soviet Russian stage and film actress and pedagogue. People's Artist of the USSR (1937).

== Biography ==
Vera Pashennaya was born to the family of the famous actor Nikolay Roshchin-Insarov (1861 — 1899, surname at birth being Pashenny). Her sister, actress Yekaterina Roshchina-Insarov, emigrated in 1919.

She joined the CPSU in 1954.

== Filmography ==
- Polikushka (1922) as Akulina
- Wolves and Sheep (1953) as Murzavetskaya
- Ekaterina Voronina (1957) as Ekaterina's grandmother
- The Idiot (1958) as Yepanchina, General's wife

== Awards and honors ==
- Honored Artist of the Republic (1925)
- People's Artist of the USSR (1937)
- Two Orders of Lenin (1937, 1949)
- Stalin Prize, 1st class (1943)
- Order of the Red Banner of Labour (1957)
- Lenin Prize (1961)
- Medal "For Valiant Labour in the Great Patriotic War 1941–1945"
- Medal "In Commemoration of the 800th Anniversary of Moscow"
