= Vasily Surikov (film) =

- Russian: Василий Суриков
- Directed by: Anatoli Rybakov
- Written by: Emil Braginsky; Vasily Yakovlev
- Produced by: Lazar Milkis
- Starring: Yevgeni Lazarev; Larisa Kadochnikova; Gennady Yudin; Georgy Vitsin
- Cinematography: Gavriil Yegiazarov
- Edited by: Yekaterina Karpova
- Music by: Vladimir Yurovsky
- Production company: Mosfilm
- Release date: 1959
- Running time: 94 min.
- Country: Soviet Union
- Language: Russian

Vasily Surikov (Russian: Василий Суриков) is a 1959 Soviet drama film directed by Anatoli Rybakov.

The film is a biographical drama about the life and work of the great Russian painter Vasily Surikov.

== Plot ==
In the late 1860s, with the financial support of Krasnoyarsk philanthropist and gold miner P. I. Kuznetsov, the talented young Vasily Surikov travels to Saint Petersburg. After three months of preparation, he successfully passes the entrance exams for the Academy of Arts.

Despite the success of his first major painting, The Morning of the Streltsy Execution, which was purchased by Pavel Tretyakov, Surikov’s exacting standards for his work lead him to devote significant time and effort to each subsequent painting. His wife, Liza, proves to be a steadfast supporter, but her untimely death prompts Surikov to return to his hometown of Krasnoyarsk. Throughout his career, Surikov receives guidance and encouragement from his friends in the Association of Traveling Art Exhibitions, including Ilya Repin and Ivan Kramskoi.

Surikov also briefly befriends Alexey Lunyov, a promising artist whose creative potential fades as he succumbs to painting trivial salon commissions. Lunyov’s life ends tragically in madness. Meanwhile, Surikov’s arduous search for models for his painting Menshikov in Beryozovo proves successful, inspiring him to work passionately on the large-scale canvas. He later undertakes the challenging task of depicting a scene from the history of the Russian Church Schism, continuing his dedication to complex historical themes.

== Cast ==
- Yevgeni Lazarev as Vasily Ivanovich Surikov
- Larisa Kadochnikova as Yelizaveta Avgustovna Surikova
- Leonid Gallis as Avgust Share, Lilya's father
- Gennady Yudin as Aleksei Alekseyevich Lunyov
- Georgy Vitsin as Ilya Yefimovich Repin
- Ivan Kudryavtsev as Ivan Nikolayevich Kramskoi
- Anatoly Fedorinov as Pavel Mikhailovich Tretyakov
- Vladimir Belokurov as Pyotr Kuznetsov
- Nikolai Sergeyev as black-bearded man
- Vladimir Kashpur as yurodivy
- Yevgeny Morgunov as snow town commandant
