= Ring of Daring =

- Russian: Арена смелых
- Directed by: Sergei Gurov; Yuriy Ozerov
- Written by: Sergei Gurov; Yuriy Ozerov
- Starring: Oleg Popov; Eduard Sjereda; Artisti Shubini; Manuela Papyan; Abdulayev; Artisti Kozhukovoi
- Cinematography: Fyodor Firsov; Era Savelyeva
- Music by: Yuriy Levitin
- Release date: 1953
- Running time: 76 minutes
- Country: Soviet Union

Ring of Daring (Russian: Арена смелых) is a 1953 Soviet documentary film directed by Sergei Gurov and Yuriy Ozerov.

== Plot ==
The film features a circus performance, in which the most famous young circus performers of the USSR take part.

== Starring ==
- Oleg Popov as himself (lead clown)
- Eduard Sjereda as himself (clown)
- Artisti Shubini as Themselves (dancers-acrobats)
- Manuela Papyan as herself (dancer-contortionist)
- Abdulayev as himself (dancer-acrobat)
- Artisti Kozhukovoi as Themselves (jugglers)
- Violetta Kriss as herself (acrobat)
- Aleksandr Kriss as himself (acrobat)
- Gruppe Vitushi Muldavi as Themselves (dance troupe)
- Boris Bressler as himself (acrobat)
- Shkodnikov as himself (clown)
