= Inna Zubkovskaya =

- Born: Inna Borisovna Izraileva; 29 November 1923; Moscow, Soviet Union
- Died: 5 February 2001 (aged 77); Saint Petersburg, Russia
- Occupation: Ballet dancer

Inna Borisovna Zubkovskaya (Russian: Инна Борисовна Зубковская; 29 November 1923 – 5 February 2001) was a Soviet and Russian ballerina. She was trained at the Bolshoi Theatre and graduated in 1941. She immediately joined the Kirov Ballet where she remained until her retirement in 1970. According to Meisner, "her flawless technique, allied to a sensitive reticence, fitted the Mariinsky's elegant purity and they invited her to join". She was half-Jewish with an exceptional, dark-eyed beauty - earning the nickname the Black Pearl. She then became a teacher of the company until her death. She married twice: first to Nikolai Zubkovsky - whose name she kept for the stage - before divorcing him and marrying Svyatoslav Kuznetsov. Both her husbands were dancers. and her daughter, Katerina, and her son, Nikolai, both became dancers in the Mariinsky.

Zubkovskaya was unusual as she was a Kirov dancer with a Bolshoi background. This arose as she was evacuated to Perm, a wartime haven for Soviet artists and arts institutions, where she joined the Kirov Ballet. She danced many major roles of the classical repertory, including Odette/Odile in Swan Lake, Nikiya in La Bayadère, Kitri in Don Quixote, the Lilac Fairy in The Sleeping Beauty and the title role of La Esmeralda.

The roles she created include the classic role of Phrygia in Leonid Yakobson's version of Spartacus in 1956 and Mekhmene-Banu in Yury Grigorovich's Legend of Love in 1961. Yakobson also made Shuraleh for her and she scored an enormous success in his Choreographic Miniatures, dancing the Eternal Idol, based on a Rodin sculpture.

Zubkovskaya did not dance frequently in the West, although in 1961 when the Kirov made its first appearances outside Russia, she was the first-cast Odette-Odile in Swan Lake and was partnered by Vladilen Semyonov. She opened the New York season in that role at the Metropolitan Opera House on 11 September 1961. Other notable roles included the Lilac Fairy in The Sleeping Beauty and as the Mistress of the Copper Mountain in Grigorovich's The Tale of the Stone Flower. Zubkovskaya and her second husband, Svyatoslav Kuznetsov, played the title roles in the Russian film Aleko which was released in 1953. She was awarded the Stalin Prize in 1951, among other honours.

She coached many famous dancers during her teaching career, including: Altynai Asylmutova, Larissa Lezhnina, Elvira Terasova, and Veronika Part.

== See also ==
- List of Russian ballet dancers

== Sources ==
- "Inna Zubkovskaya - ballet dancer, Russia - Brief Article - Obituary". Dance Magazine. 75 (6). Archived from the original on January 27, 2005 – via FindArticles.
- "Obituary: Inna Zubkovskaya". The Independent. March 14, 2001.
