= Attack from the Sea =

1953 film by Mikhail Romm

- Directed by: Mikhail Romm
- Written by: Aleksandr Shtein
- Starring: Ivan Pereverzev; Gennadi Yudin; Vladimir Druzhnikov; Sergei Bondarchuk
- Cinematography: Yu-Lan Chen; Aleksandr Shelenkov
- Edited by: Yeva Ladyzhenskaya
- Music by: Aram Khachaturian
- Production company: Mosfilm
- Release date: 1953
- Running time: 94 minutes
- Country: Soviet Union
- Language: Russian

Attack from the Sea (Russian: Корабли штурмуют бастионы, romanized: Korabli shturmuyut bastiony, lit. 'Ships Are Storming Bastions') is a 1953 Soviet biographical war film directed by Mikhail Romm and starring Ivan Pereverzev, Gennadi Yudin and Vladimir Druzhnikov.

The film is about the career of the Russian Vice-Admiral Fyodor Ushakov, particularly his squadron's part in the Mediterranean campaign of 1798 and the Siege of Corfu (1798–99), fighting in cooperation with Alexander Suvorov’s ground troops to liberate Italy from the forces of Napoleon Bonaparte. It was made by the Moscow-based Ministry of Cinematography by the production unit Mosfilm, in Agfa-color, renamed Sovcolor by Moscow. It is the sequel to Admiral Ushakov, released earlier the same year.

== Plot ==
In 1798, French expansionism prompts Russia, Britain and the Ottoman Empire to form an anti-French coalition. Ushakov is summoned to St. Petersburg, where he meets the disgraced Suvorov. His old enemy, Count Mordovtsev, seeks to discredit him before Emperor Paul I, accusing him of unauthorized fleet repairs, criticizing the Admiralty's poor supplies, and harboring escaped convict Tikhon Prokofiev. The British ambassador persuades Paul to send Ushakov against France and the Ottomans (who respect him and nickname him "Ushak Pasha") allow him to lead his fleet through the Bosphorus. Mordovtsev grudgingly orders Ushakov to cooperate with British Vice-admiral Horatio Nelson. Suvorov mocks Russia's tendency to praise foreign methods that Ushakov himself pioneered. In July, after French forces land in Egypt and seize Naples, Ushakov leads a Russo–Ottoman squadron to the Ionian Islands, capturing all of them except for the heavily fortified Corfu. Meanwhile, in Naples, British diplomat Sir William Hamilton manipulates Nelson and his wife Emma into undermining Ushakov, even plotting sabotage through Emma's associate Orfano.

Preparing for the assault on Corfu, Ushakov drills his troops intensely, compensates for poor Ottoman provisions with his own funds and resists appeals from Naples to abandon the siege. Napoleon, in Egypt, considers Corfu impregnable. Ushakov's plan is to capture the nearby island of Vido with naval artillery, then attack Corfu itself. He informs his officers of Russia's intention to create a republic on the Ionian Islands under a locally inspired constitution. Greek-born officer Metaxa objects, but Ushakov insists it honours local traditions and serves Russian interests. Privately, he names Dmitry Senyavin as his successor should he fall. The assault on Vido begins with a heavy bombardment followed by a naval landing. A mishap on Bogoyavlenie delays the attack until replaced by Svyatoy Mikhail. Vido falls, and the fleet turns to Corfu. After fierce fighting, Russian forces take the island. Prokofiev raises the Russian flag but is killed by a French officer. On shore, Orfano attempts to assassinate Ushakov but is foiled by Viktor Ermolaev, who is mortally wounded. Ushakov declares Prokofiev died in the assault, avoiding his extradition.

Suvorov, now commanding in Northern Italy, congratulates Ushakov, saying he wished he had been at Corfu "even as a midshipman." Ushakov treasures the letter above any award. In a lighter moment, sailor Pirozhkov is punished with three days' arrest for drunkenly assaulting an Ottoman boatswain who tried to rape a local girl. With the Ionian Islands secured, Ushakov blockades Italian ports. Belli's detachment, alongside British Commodore Edward Foote, captures Naples from the French. The victory is undermined when Admiral John Jervis allows French ships from Egypt to escape back to Europe, possibly with Napoleon aboard.

The royal couple of Naples returns, and Queen Maria Carolina vows vengeance on Republicans. Nelson annuls Foote's capitulation, enabling mass executions of French prisoners and local republicans; Foote resigns in protest. Ushakov's officers are dismayed at handing the city to "mad royal executioners". Nelson himself laments the political manipulation and Britain's loss of honour but follows orders. Ushakov meets Nelson aboard HMS Vanguard to plan the capture of Malta. Nelson favors blockade; Ushakov demands an assault. The discussion turns into a heated exchange over Naples and allied betrayals. Ushakov warns there will be no executions where the Russian flag flies; his forces then liberate Rome from the French. The Mediterranean campaign ends with the fleet’s return to Sevastopol. Despite his victories, the new Emperor Alexander I, influenced by Mordovtsev, forces Ushakov into retirement. In 1811, retired Admiral Ushakov visits the battleship Saint Paul. Captain Vasiliev greets him with full honors. Ushakov reunites with former sailors Khovrin and Pirozhkov, the doctor Ermolaev, and the latter’s youngest son, Alexander, brother of the late Viktor.

== Cast ==
- Ivan Pereverzev as Adm. Fedor Fedorovich Ushakov
- Gennadi Yudin as Capt. Dmitri Nikolayevich Senyavin
- Vladimir Druzhnikov as Capt. Vasilyev
- Aleksey Alekseev as Capt. Yegor Metaksa
- Sergei Bondarchuk as Tikhon Alexeyevich Prokofiev
- Nikolai Khryashchikov as Khovrin, old sailor
- Mikhail Pugovkin as Piroshkov
- Georgiy Yumatov as Ermolaev
- Vladimir Balashov as Capt. Grigori (Henry) Baillie
- Pavel Volkov as Medical Doctor
- Pyotr Lyubeshkin
- Sergey Petrov as Gen. Aleksandr Vasilyevich Suvorov
- Pavel Pavlenko as Czar Pavel I
- Nikolai Svobodin as Mordovzev
- Mikhail Nazvanov as Czar Alexander I
- Ivan Solovyov as Lord Admiral Horatio Nelson
- Iosif Tolchanov as Lord William Hamilton
- Yelena Kuzmina as Emma Hamilton
- V. Tumanov as Foot
- Nikolay Volkov as Pitt the Younger
- Sergei Martinson as King Ferdinand
- Ada Vojtsik as Queen Carolina
- Valeriy Lekarev as Napoleon I
- Emmanuil Geller as Ambassador Misharu
- Boris Bibikov as Spencer Smith
- G. Rozhdestvensky as Mordovtsev
- Evgeni Agurov as Englishman
- Georgiy Budarov
- Lev Fenin
- Lev Frichinsky as Turchaninov
- Nikolai Kryukov
- Gotlib Roninson
- Georgi Shapovalov as Russian Army officer
- Pavel Shpringfeld as Orfano
- Semyon Svashenko as Russian Army officer

== Bibliography ==
- Rollberg, Peter. Historical Dictionary of Russian and Soviet Cinema. Scarecrow Press, 2008.
