= Admiral Ushakov (film) =

1953 film by Mikhail Romm

- Directed by: Mikhail Romm
- Written by: Aleksandr Shtein; Anatoly Vinogradov
- Starring: Ivan Pereverzev; Boris Livanov; Sergei Bondarchuk; Vladimir Druzhnikov; Gennadi Yudin
- Cinematography: Yu-Lan Chen; Aleksandr Shelenkov
- Edited by: Yeva Ladyzhenskaya
- Music by: Aram Khachaturian
- Production company: Mosfilm
- Release date: April 23, 1953
- Running time: 108 minutes
- Country: Soviet Union
- Language: Russian

Admiral Ushakov (Russian: Адмирал Ушаков) is a 1953 Soviet historical war film directed by Mikhail Romm and starring Ivan Pereverzev, Boris Livanov and Sergei Bondarchuk.

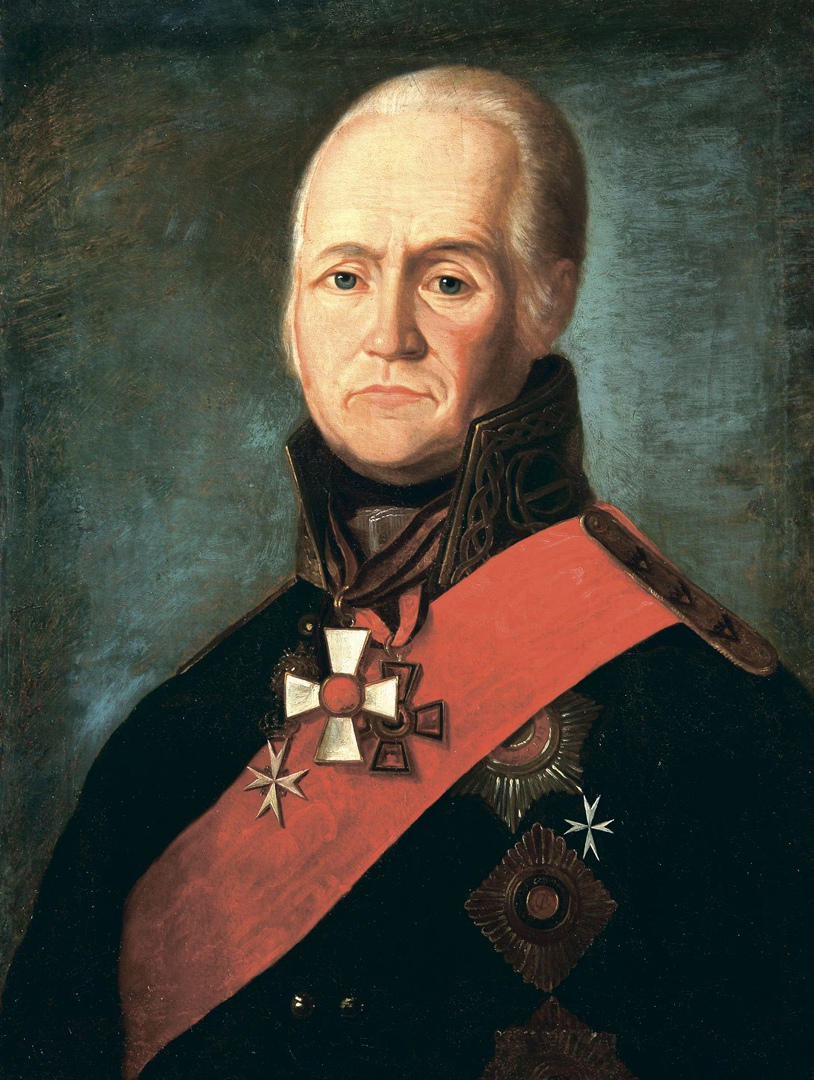
Admiral Fyodor Ushakov

The film portrays the career of Fyodor Ushakov, regarded as one of the greatest naval commanders in history. As admiral of the Russian fleet under Catherine the Great and Paul I, he won every battle he participated in. A sequel, Attack from the Sea, was released the same year. The film is dedicated to the formation of the Russian fleet on the Black Sea.

== Plot ==
In 1780, Captain of the Imperial Navy Fyodor Ushakov asks the Commander-in-Chief Grigory Potemkin to oversee the construction of the Black Sea Fleet. This means giving up a career at the royal court in St. Petersburg. Three years later, Ushakov arrives at the Kherson shipyards with a contingent of sailors and craftsmen. An epidemic of plague rages among the workers. Tikhon Prokofiev, nicknamed the Ragged Ear, encourages the workers to flee the city and set fire to the shipyards, at the instigation of the English spy Orfano. With the help of his sailors, Ushakov stops the rebels and organizes a fire-fighting brigade to put out the fire. A strict quarantine regime is introduced and the plague is brought under control. Viktor Ermolaev, a mere boy, asks Ushakov to enlist in the Russian Navy. Ushakov refuses him, because the ships are not yet finished.

While shipbuilders work on constructing the fleet, Ushakov conducts artillery training for the officers. Throughout the film, he stresses the importance of accuracy in artillery firing. Potemkin arrives to witness the launching of the ships. The head of the newly created Black Sea Admiralty board, Count Mordovtsev, informs Potemkin that Ushakov has not been training his officers strictly according to naval statutes. Potemkin sees the potential of a talented naval commander, and dismisses his transgressions. Workmen cut the ropes holding the St. Paul on drydock, and the battleship is launched into the sea. The boy, Viktor Ermolaev, despite protests from his mother, runs to the ship to join the Navy.

Fast forward to 1787. At the head of an entourage of courtiers and foreign ambassadors, Catherine the Great travels to Crimea to inspect the fleet. Potemkin complains to the ambassadors that Turkish pirates operating in the Black Sea are using English and French weapons. The ambassadors of Great Britain and France ignore the statements. Potemkin decides to surprise the audience with a display of military might. At his signal, Ushakov commands the battleships to fire on an abandoned fortress. Ushakov, in his excitement at the accurate firing of the gunners, cries out "Well done Vasiliev, a glass of vodka for everyone!". Despite his indelicacy, the Empress promotes Count Voinovich to Rear Admiral, and Ushakov to Brigadier General.

Cut to London. The British government wishes to maintain its supremacy of the seas and is concerned about the appearance of the Russian fleet on the Black Sea. Prime Minister William Pitt the Younger decides the best way to contain the Russian fleet is by goading the Turkish sultan into war against Russia. The sultan takes the bait, orders the Russian ambassador to be imprisoned in the Fortress of the Seven Towers, and declares war on Russia. In Crimea, a liaison officer informs the English spy Orfano that war is beginning. The British are arranging that the Crimean Tatars rise up in revolt when the Turks land in Crimea. Orfano's task is to get rid of Ushakov, and he enlists Tikhon Prokofiev to kill him. Instead of agreeing to the order, Prokofiev attacks Orfano, but is forced to stop when a group of sailors passes by. Orfano informs Count Mordovtsev that Ushakov is harboring a runaway convict. When Mordovtsev goes to report this to Potemkin, Senyavin arrives with the news that Turkey has declared war on Russia.

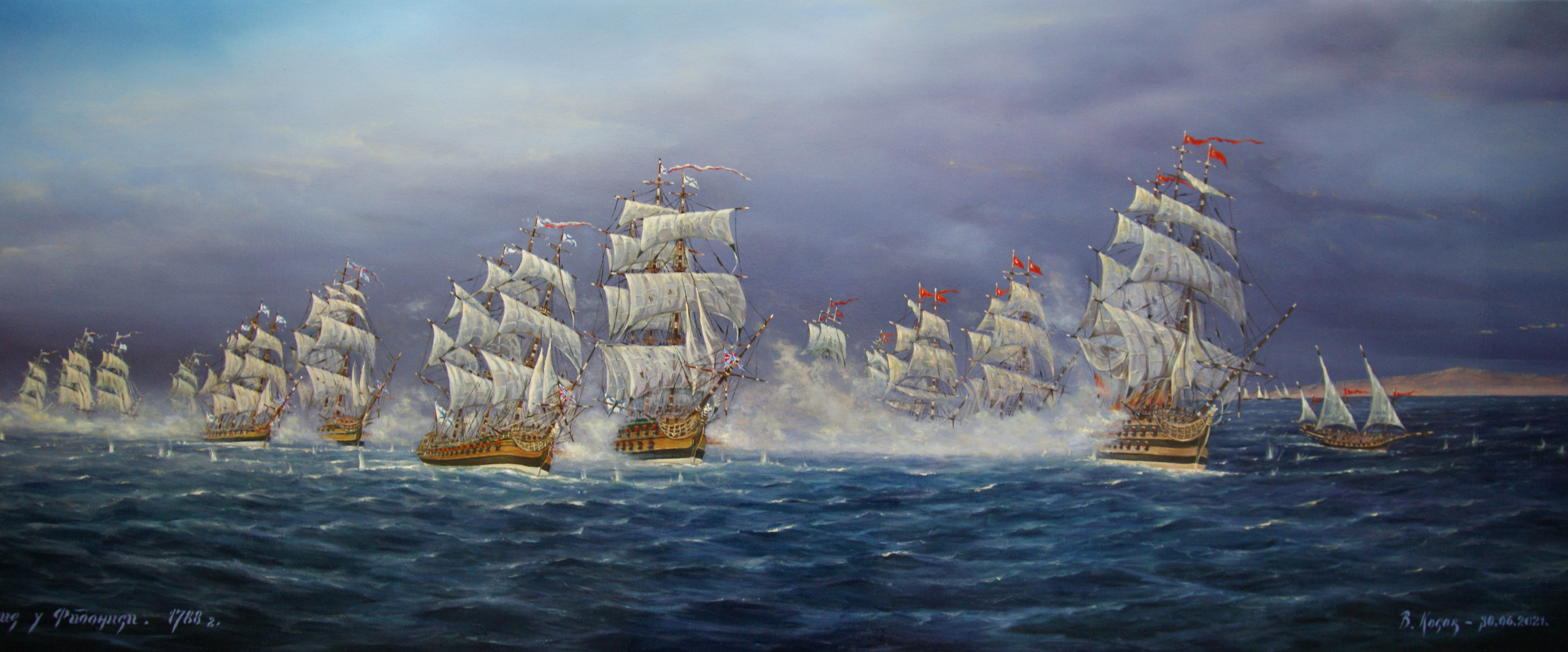
Battle of Fidonisi

In the second year of the Russo-Turkish War (1787-1792), the Battle of Fidonisi takes place near Snake Island (Black Sea). Fidonisi is the Greek name for the island. The Turks have a clear advantage of 17 battleships against 2 Russian, but Brigadier General Ushakov, commanding the battleship St. Paul and the frigates Berislav and Strela, is confident he can achieve victory. He convinces Rear Admiral Count Voinovich to let him act at his own discretion. Before the battle, Prokofiev confesses to Ushakov that he is a runaway convict, but Ushakov orders him to take his post. Ushakov's three ships break away from the squadron and maneuver to the head of the Turkish line. The Turks open fire, but their shots fall short. Ushakov forbids shooting back until the ships are within firing distance. The Turkish commander orders his sailors to prepare for boarding, but the Russian ships open a devastating round of fire on the Turkish line. The Turkish flagship is under fire from both sides, causing the Turkish line to turn away and flee. The Russians are victorious.

In 1790, the Battle of Tendra results in another Russian victory. In London, officers Edward Foote and Horatio Nelson analyze Ushakov's tactics in the battle. Foote sees his violation of the rules of engagement as barbarous, but Nelson admires his innovations. Nelson's superior officer reminds him of the fate of Admiral Bing, who was shot for violating the regulations of the Admiralty. In Constantinople, the Turkish Sultan and his associates discuss the situation. Admiral Said-Ali, an Algerian, reassures the Sultan that new ships from the Mediterranean Sea are faster and more powerful than the Russian ships. He promises the Sultan to bring back Ushakov in an iron cage.

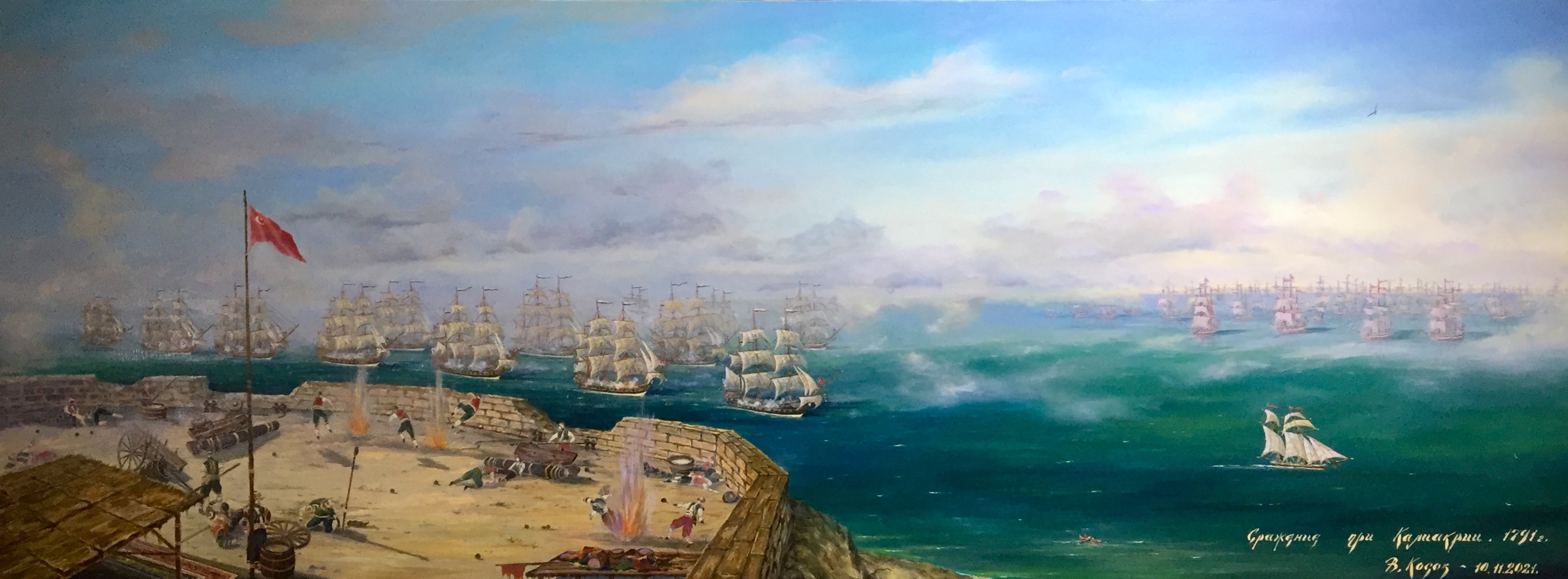
Battle of Kaliakria

At the Battle of Kaliakria, the Russian fleet passes under the fire of coastal batteries, and then falls in line with the Turkish fleet. During the battle, Ushakov's flagship draws close to the flagship of Said-Ali. Ushakov notices the Turkish admiral and shouts to him, "Hey, Said-Ali, I'll teach you to make promises to the Sultan!" The battle lasts until late at night and ends with the defeat of the Turkish fleet.

Upon the death of Potemkin in 1791, Mordovtsev becomes Commander of the Black Sea Fleet. He is determined to make Ushakov more obedient. He tells him that an officer has a voice, a boatswain has a pipe, and a sailor is no more than a tool for obeying orders. Without arguing, Ushakov departs and returns to complete the port of Sevastopol. The people welcome him back as a hero.

== Cast ==
- Ivan Pereverzev as Adm. Feodor Feodorovich Ushakov
- Boris Livanov as Prince Grigori Aleksandrovich Potemkin
- Sergei Bondarchuk as Tikhon Alekseevich Prokofiev
- Vladimir Druzhnikov as Midshipman Vasilyev
- Gennadi Yudin as Capt. Dmitri Nikolayevich Senyavin
- Vladimir Vasilyev as Sultan Eski Hassan
- Nikolai Svobodin as Mordovtsev
- Nikolai Chistyakov as Voinovich
- Mikhail Pugovkin as Pirozhkov
- Aleksey Alekseev as Metaksa
- Georgi Yumatov as Viktor Ermolaev
- Pavel Volkov as Medical Doctor Ermolaev
- Olga Zhiznyeva as Empress Catherine the Great
- Nikolai Khryashchikov as Khvorin, palace guard
- Nikolay Volkov as William Pitt
- Ivan Solovyov as Admiral Horatio Nelson
- Vladimir Etush as Capt. Said-Ali
- Pavel Shpringfeld as Shipbuilder Orfano
- Grigory Shpigel as Thomas Grey
- Lev Fenin as Robert Ansley
- Pyotr Sobolevsky as English Ambassador
- Yan Yanakiyev as French Ambassador
- Georgy Georgiu as Turkish Ambassador
- Vyacheslav Gostinsky as Lanskoy
- Nikolay Kutuzov as General
- Viktor Kulakov as Korovin
- Pyotr Lyubeshkin as Lepekhin

== Production ==
The original version of the script was written by the historian-novelist Anatoly Vinogradov in 1944, during his time at the front. Vinogradov's name is not listed in the credits, but his official bibliography cites the screenplay.

The film was commissioned by the Soviet Navy under Vice Admiral Nikolai Kuznetsov to publicize the importance of Admiral Ushakov in naval history. During World War II, the Order of Ushakov was created for Soviet Naval officers for outstanding achievements leading to victory over a numerically superior enemy. The Ushakov Medal was also established for sailors who risked their life defending the Soviet Union. The USSR Department of the Navy and the Ministry of Foreign Affairs advised on the script. Filming was conducted at the fortress in Bilhorod-Dnistrovskyi.

== Historical Inaccuracies ==
Potemkin is depicted as blind in the left eye. He was blind in the right eye.

The same actor portrays the Turkish Sultan both at the beginning and the end of the Russo-Turkish War of 1787-1792. From 1787 to 1789, the sultan was Abdul Hamid I, and from 1789 to 1792, the sultan was his nephew Selim III.

The Turkish sultan swears that the sky will soon fall to the ground and the waters of the Danube will flow backward than its fleet will be defeated. This phrase was actually the answer of the chief of the fortress Ismail Aidozle-Mehmet Pasha to the ultimatum of Suvorov before the assault.

The narrator attributes a victory at Sinop to Ushakov. This battle was won not by him, but by Pavel Nakhimov in the Crimean War. Perhaps, the actions of the Black Sea Fleet are considered from the Turkish coast in 1789-1790, when a blow was struck on a number of Turkish ports, including Sinop.

After the capture of Ishmael, the Ottoman Empire still had a large fleet, so the references to a "broken fleet" are strange.

Captured in battle at Tendra, the Turkish battleship "Meleki-Bahri" is depicted as three-deck (that is, carrying at least 90 guns), whereas in reality it was a two-deck 66-gun ship. In addition, Meleki-Bahri was captured by the battleship Mary Magdalene, and not by St. Paul, as the film shows.

In the Battle of Fidonisi, Voinovich's ship The Transfiguration of the Lord won a battle against two ships of the Turkish fleet, sinking the Turkish Shebek. In the film, the whole battle was led by Ushakov while Voinovich prayed.

During the Russo-Turkish War, Count Voinovich was about 40 years old and five years younger than Ushakov. In the film, he is shown as an old man. Nikolai Svobodin, the actor who played Mordovtsev, was 55 years old during filming. The real Mordovtsev was 37 years old in 1791, when the film ends.

Ushakov's flagship during the entirety of the film is the 66-gun St. Paul. By the time of the Battle of Kerch Strait (1790) in 1790, his flagship was the 84-gun Nativity of Christ.

The Battle of Kaliakria is shown as a decisive rout of the Turkish fleet, but the Turks did not lose a single ship and were able to sail away thanks to the structural superiority of their ships. However, the Turkish fleet was strongly disorganized - most of the ships scattered along the Rumeli coast, having received damage of varying degrees. The Turkish flagship sank, having already reached Constantinople, which made a heavy impression on the inhabitants of the capital of the Ottoman Empire.

== Reception ==
=== Critical Response ===
The New York Times wrote, "With a huge cast populating a lavish, sprawling assortment of period backgrounds, the picture combines spectacle and a surprisingly simple and persuasive close-up of the hero. 'Admiral Ushakov' is a good example of Soviet free-handedness in old-fashioned, grand-scale pageantry, with no evidence of scrimping."

== Awards ==
Certificate for Best Foreign Film at the Vichy Film Festival (1954).

== Bibliography ==
- Rollberg, Peter. Historical Dictionary of Russian and Soviet Cinema. Scarecrow Press, 2008.
