= Vladimir Druzhnikov =

Soviet actor (1922–1994)

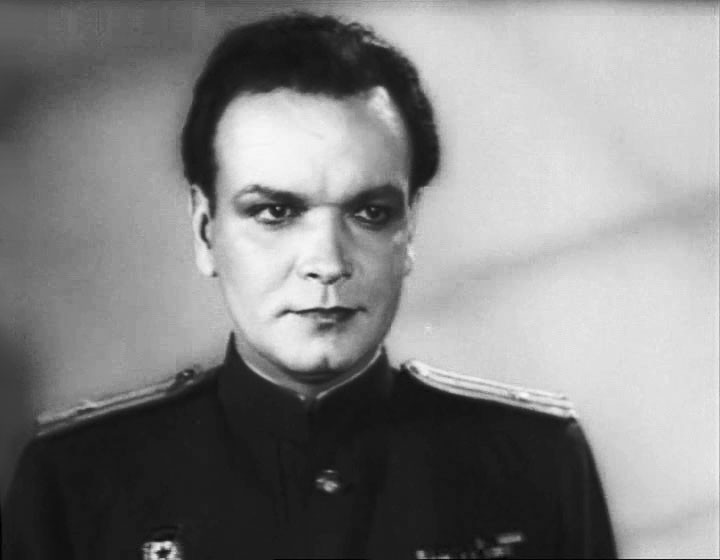
- Born: 30 May 1922; Moscow, Russian SFSR
- Died: 20 February 1994 (aged 71); Moscow, Russia
- Other name: Vladimir Drujnikov
- Occupation: Actor
- Years active: 1945—1994
- Spouse: Nina Chalova

Vladimir Vasilievich Druzhnikov (Russian: Влади́мир Васи́льевич Дру́жников; 30 May 1922 – 20 February 1994) was a Soviet actor. He appeared in more than 40 films between 1945 and 1992. He was a People's Artist of the RSFSR (1974) and the winner of two Stalin Prizes (1948, 1950).

== Partial filmography ==
- Bez viny vinovatye (1945) - Grigoriy Neznamov
- The Stone Flower (1946) - Danilo - master
- The Great Glinka (1946) - Rileyev
- Nashe serdtse (1947) - Sergey Kazakov
- Ballad of Siberia (1948) - Andrei Nikolayevich Balashov
- Konstantin Zaslonov (1949) - Konstantin Zaslonov
- Zagovor obrechyonnykh (1950) - Mark Pino
- Zhukovsky (1950) - Nesterov
- The Miners of Donetsk (1951) - Trofimenko
- Admiral Ushakov (1953) - Midshipman Vasilyev
- Attack from the Sea (1953) - Capt. Vasilyev
- Chest tovarishcha (1953) - mayor Sergey Bokunov
- Opasnye tropy (1955) - Vasiliy Zholudev
- The Grasshopper (1955) - Ryabovsky
- Neobyknovennoye leto (1957)
- Pervye Radosti (1957) - Yegor Tsvetukhin
- Krutye stupeni (1957) - Yevgeniy Tarasovich Narezsnyy
- Lastochka (1958) - Yarnovsky
- Lyudi na mostu (1960) - Odintsov
- Duel (1961) - Von Koren
- Dve zhizni (1961) - Kirill Borozdin
- Generali da zizilebi (1963) - Dobrov
- The Three Sisters (1964) - Solyony
- The Hyperboloid of Engineer Garin (1965) - Arthur Levy / Volshin
- Artakarg handznararutyun (1966) - Neledetsky
- Desyatyy shag (1967)
- Net i da (1967) - Vorontsov
- Tainstvennyy monakh (1968) - Vorontsov
- Morskoy kharakter (1970) - Vasiliy Sergeyevich Filatov
- Waterloo (1970) - Gerard
- Officers (1971) - Georgiy Petrovich
- Chelovek v shtatskom (1973) - Stepan
- Bez prava na oshibku (1975) - Yuriy Petrovich - prokuror
- The Tavern on Pyatnitskaya (1978) - Volokhov
- U menya vsyo normalno (1978)
- Plata za istinu (1978) - Sechenov
- Life Is Beautiful (1979) - (voice)
- Ledyanaya vnuchka (1980)
- The Mystery of the Third Planet (1981) - (voice)
- Oni byli aktyorami (1981)
- Vertical Race (1982, TV Movie) - Alexey Y. Uvnarskiy, Surgeon
- Auktsion (1983) - Sergey Travnikov
- Probuzhdenie (1983) - Rukin
- Chelovek na polustanke (1983)
- Zhil otvazhnyy kapitan (1985)
- Bagrationi (1985)
- Tantsploshchadka (1986) - Ippolit Anatolyevich
- Private Detective, or Operation Cooperation (1990) - Passenger
- Glukhoman (1991)
- Back in the USSR (1992) - Priest
- Zhelaniye lyubvi (1993) - Doctor
