= List of Soviet films of 1954 =

A list of films produced in the Soviet Union in 1954 (see also 1954 in film).

== 1954 ==
Title	Russian title	Director	Cast	Genre	Notes
1954
The Anna Cross	Анна на шее	Isidor Annensky	Alla Larionova	Drama	
A Big Family	Большая семья	Iosif Kheifits	Sergei Lukyanov, Boris Andreyev, Vera Kuznetsova	Drama	Entered into the 1955 Cannes Film Festival
Boris Godunov	Борис Годунов	Vera Stroyeva	Alexander Pirogov	Opera	Screened at the 1987 Cannes Film Festival
Certificate of Maturity	Аттестат зрелости	Tatyana Lukashevich	Vasily Lanovoy	Drama	
Commander of the Ship	Командир корабля	Vladimir Braun	Mikhail Kuznetsov, Anatoliy Verbitskiy	Drama	
Devotion	Испытание верности	Ivan Pyryev	Sergei Romodanov		
Did We Meet Somewhere Before	Мы с вами где-то встречались	Nikolay Dostal, Andrey Tutyshkin	Arkady Raikin	Comedy	
The Frigid Sea	Море студёное	Yuri Yegorov	Nikolay Kryuchkov	Drama	
The Great Warrior Skanderbeg	Великий воин Албании Скандербег	Sergei Yutkevich	Akaki Khorava	Biopic, history, drama	Was entered into the 1954 Cannes Film Festival where it earned the International Prize
Least We Forget	Об этом забывать нельзя	Leonid Lukov	Sergey Bondarchuk		
Sakhalin Island	Остров Сахалин	Eldar Ryazanov, Vasiliy Katanyan	Leonid Khmara	Documentary	
The Safety Match	Шведская спичка	Konstantin Yudin	Alexey Gribov	Comedy	
School of Courage	Школа мужества	Vladimir Basov and Mstislav Korchagin	Leonid Kharitonov	War	
A Tale of the Forest Giant	Повесть о лесном великане	Alexander Zguridi	Oleg Zhakov	Drama	
Tamer of Tigers	Укротительница тигров	Nadezhda Kosheverova, Aleksandr Ivanovsky	Lyudmila Kasatkina, Pavel Kadochnikov, Leonid Bykov	Comedy	
The Boys from Leningrad	Запасной игрок	Semyon Timoshenko	Georgy Vitsin	Comedy	
True Friends	Верные друзья	Mikhail Kalatozov	Vasili Merkuryev, Boris Chirkov, Aleksandr Borisov, Alexey Gribov	Comedy, drama	
Two Friends	Два друга	Viktor Eisymont	Lyonya Krauklis	Drama	
World Champion	Чемпион мира	Vladimir Gonchukov	Aleksey Vanin	Drama	

== See also ==
- 1954 in the Soviet Union
