= Larisa Avdeyeva =

Soviet-Russian singer (1925–2013)

- Лариса Авдеева
- Avdeyeva as Gertrude in Bánk bán, 1959
- Born: 21 June 1925; Moscow, Soviet Union
- Died: 10 March 2013 (aged 87); Moscow, Russia
- Occupation: Mezzo-soprano
- Years active: 1947-1983
- Spouse: Yevgeny Svetlanov

Larisa Ivanovna Avdeyeva or Avdeeva (Russian: Лариса Ивановна Авдеева; 21 June 1925 – 10 March 2013) was a Soviet and Russian mezzo-soprano, who starred with the Bolshoi Opera for thirty years. She was awarded the title of People’s Artist of the RSFSR in (1964).

== Biography ==
Larisa Ivanovna Avdeyeva was born on 21 June 1925 in Moscow to a family of opera singers. Though surrounded by music and performing in a children's glee club from age eleven, Avdeyeva initially wanted to study architecture. After World War II, she entered college to study construction, but a year later changed over to music. She studied at the Stanislavski and Nemirovich-Danchenko Theatre from 1945 to 1946, and the following year began working as a soloist at the Stanislavsky Musical Theatre of Moscow. Among the roles she performed were Olga in Tchaikovsky's Eugene Onegin, Varvara in the 1950 premiere of Frol Skobeyev by Tikhon Khrennikov, Mistress of Copper Mountain the 1951 premier of Kamenniy tsvetok (based on the story The Stone Flower) by Kirill Molchanov and Kosova in the 1952 production of V buryu (Into the Storm) by Khrennikov. She made her debut at the Bolshoi Theatre in 1952 reprising her earlier role of Olga.

She was a mezzo-soprano and quickly became a lead singer for those roles, performing as Spring in The Snow Maiden by Nikolai Rimsky-Korsakov and Martha in Khovanshchina by Modest Mussorgsky. Avdeyeva excelled in the Rimsky-Korsakov roles of Ljubasha in The Tsar's Bride and Lel in The Snow Maiden and Carmen in the Georges Bizet opera of the same name. Some of her later roles included Princess in Tchaikovsky’s Enchantress, Konchakovna in Borodin’s Prince Igor, Akhrosimova in Prokofiev's War and Peace and the Commissar in Kholminov’s Optimisticheskaya tragediya. She also performed in Canada, Europe, Japan and the United States. Making a 1975 trip to the US, Avdeyeva's portrayal of the Countess in War and Peace was described as "not only acted [but] sung superbly".

In addition to her 30 years of live appearances with the Bolshoi, for four decades Avdeyeva recorded with the USSR State Symphony Orchestra, which was directed by her husband Yevgeny Svetlanov. She recorded Scriabin's Symphony No. 1 In E Major, Op. 26; in 1969, Edward Elgar's Sea Pictures & Symphony No. 2 in 1977; Tchaikovsky's "Onegin" in 1979; and Prokofiev's "Voina i mir" in 1983, among many other titles. Avdeyeva appeared in the 1951 film Большой концерт (Grand Concert) and played the role of Marina in the 1954 film Boris Godunov, both directed by Vera Stroyeva. In 1964, she was awarded the People's Artist of the RSFSR.

Adveyeva died on 10 March 2013 in Moscow.

== Bibliography ==
- Macy, Laura Williams (2008). The Grove Book of Opera Singers. New York, New York: Oxford University Press. ISBN 978-0-19-533765-5.
