= Maxim Mikhailov =

Russian opera singer

Maxim Mikhailov Максим Дормидонтович Михайлов
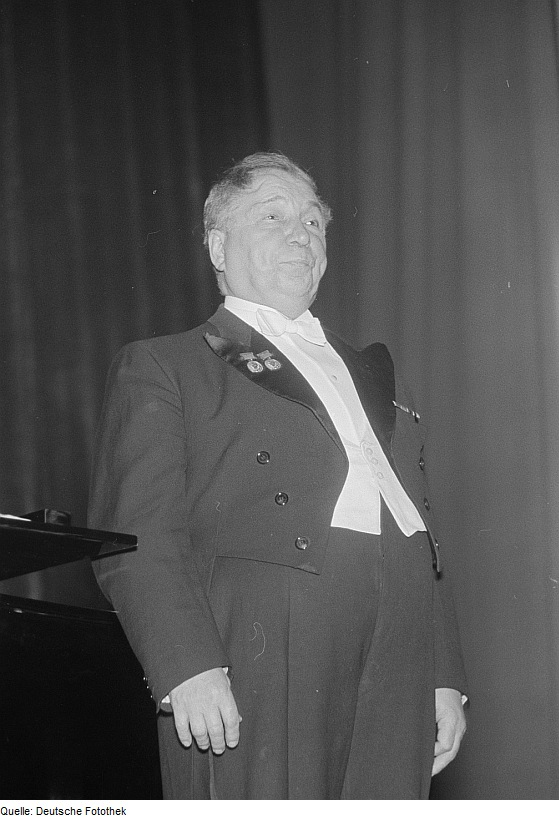

Background information
- Born: Maxim Dormidontovich Mikhailov; August 25, 1893; Koltsovka, Yadrinsky Uyezd, Kazan Governorate, Russian Empire
- Died: March 30, 1971 (aged 77) Moscow, Soviet Union
- Occupation: Operatic bass

Maxim Dormidontovich Mikhailov (Russian: Максим Дормидонтович Михайлов; 25 August [O.S. 13 August] 1893 – 30 March 1971) was a Soviet and Russian bass singer. His son, Igor Mikhailov (1920-1983) was the bass of the Bolshoi for several decades. His grandson Maxim Mikhailov (1962–2018) was also a bass singer.

Mikhailov was born in Koltsovka, Kazan Governorate. He had no musical training beyond that as an archdeacon in the Russian Orthodox Church, but was a physical phenomenon with enormous depth and volume. He was directly recruited as a singer by the Soviet authorities, his beard was shaved but he did not abdicate his curacy, and sent to study in preparation for the Bolshoi Theatre. He became Joseph Stalin's favorite singer and most famous interpreter of the role of Ivan Susanin in the reworked "patriotic" Soviet version of the opera of that name, formerly and since better known as Mikhail Glinka's A Life for the Tsar. Mikhailov sang Susanin nearly 400 times from his first performance of the role in 1939 to his last stage appearance in 1957. He also was frequently invited by Stalin to sing and drink with him late at night in Moscow Kremlin.

In addition to Susanin, Mikhailov was a renowned interpreter of other bass and basso profondo roles in Russian opera: Pimen in Boris Godunov, the miller in Dargomyzhsky's Rusalka, Khan Konchak in Prince Igor, the Viking merchant in Sadko, Gremin in Eugene Onegin.

Mikhailov recorded many of his trademark arias under the conductors Nikolai Golovanov, Aleksandr Melik-Pashayev, Aleksander Orlov, and Samuil Samosud. Among his recordings of songs, particularly well known with the pianists Nikolai Korolykov and Naum Walter are "O gentle autumn night" by Glinka, [Dargomyzhsky's "The Civil Servant", Viktor Kalinnikov's "On the Old Burial Mound", "The Blacksmith" by Yuri Sakhnovsky (1866–1930) and "The Seafarers" by Konstantin Vilboa (1817–1882). Mikhailov also performed and recorded famous folk songs, such as "The Song of the Volga Boatmen", in Rachmaninoff's arrangement for solo singer and piano, and "The sun rises and the sun sets" and "Through the wild mysterious Taiga" with the Russian Folk Orchestra conducted by Dmitri Osipov.

== Filmography ==
Year	Title	Role	Notes
1942	Kontsert frontu	Himself (singer)	
1944	Ivan the Terrible	Archdeacon	
1945	Cherevichki	Chub	
1946	The Great Glinka	Osip Petrov	
1951	Bolshoy kontsert	Konchak	
1954	Boris Godunov	Pimen, a monk	

== Awards and honors ==
- Honored Artist of the RSFSR (1937)
- Order of the Red Banner of Labour (1937)
- People's Artist of the USSR (1940)
- Two Stalin Prizes, 1st class (1941, 1942)
- Order of Lenin (1951)
- Medal "For Valiant Labour in the Great Patriotic War 1941–1945"
- Medal "In Commemoration of the 800th Anniversary of Moscow"
