= Vilboa =

Vilboa is a surname. Notable people with the surname include:

- Alexander Vilboa (1716–1781), Russian Army general
- Konstantin Vilboa (1817–1882), Russian composer
