= Aleksei Maslennikov =

Russian opera singer

Aleksei (Albert) Dmitriyevich Maslennikov (Russian: Алексей (Альберт) Дмитриевич Масленников; September 9, 1929 – November 30, 2016) was a Russian tenor.

Maslennikov was born in Novocherkassk, Russia. In 1953 he studied at the Moscow Conservatory and in 1955 became a member of the Bolshoi Theatre where he remained into the late 1990s. His vocal style is often compared to that of the German tenor Gerhard Stolze as both men shared a likeness in singing Sprechgesang. He collaborated with composer Stefania Anatolyevna Zaranek on the operetta Zolotoi Fontan.

== Repertoire at the Bolshoi Theatre ==
- Lensky (Evgeny Onegin by Tchaikovsky) – September 2, 1956
- Simpleton (Boris Godunov by Mussorgsky) – November 3, 1956
- Rudolfo (La Boheme by Puccini) – December 8, 1956
- Count Almaviva (Il barbiere di Siviglia by G. Rossini) – January 20, 1957
- Berendey (Snow Maiden by Rimsky-Korsakov) – February 12, 1957
- Werther (Werther by Massenet) – July 20, 1957
- Mazin (Mother by Khrennikov) – October 26, 1957
- Alfredo (La Traviata by Verdi) – January 9, 1958
- Laca Klemeň (Jenufa by Janáček) – December 6, 1958
- Otto (Bank Ban by F. Erkel) – May 3, 1959
- Vaudemont (Iolanta by Tchaikovsky) – October 16, 1959
- Anatole Kuragin (War and Peace by Prokofiev) – December 15, 1959
- Vladimir Igorevich (Prince Igor by Alexander Borodin) – January 24, 1960
- Kukushkin (The Story of a Real Man by Prokofiev) – October 8, 1960
- Schepin-Rostovsky (Decembrists by Y. Shaporin) – December 26, 1960
- Faust (Faust by Gounod) – February 9, 1961
- Duke of Mantua (Rigoletto by Giuseppe Verdi) – May 3, 1961
- Anatoly (The Destiny of a man by I. Dzerzhinsky) – September 30, 1961
- Vladimir Gavrilov (Not Only Love by R. Shchedrin) – March 8, 1962
- Fenton (Falstaff by G. Verdi) – November 17, 1962
- Eric (Der Fliegende Holländer by Richard Wagner) – June 6, 1963
- The adjutant of Kutuzov and the voice behind the scenes (War and Peace by Prokofiev) – October 26, 1963
- Guidon (The Tale of Tsar Saltan by Rimsky-Korsakov) – December 1, 1963
- The young actor (October by V. Muradeli) – April 24, 1964
- Chekalinsky (The Queen of Spades by Tchaikovsky) – July 23, 1964
- Hindu guest (Sadko by Rimsky-Korsakov) – January 8, 1965
- Lysander (Midsummer Night's Dream by B. Britten) – December 8, 1965
- Pinkerton (Madam Butterfly by G. Puccini.) – December 1, 1966
- Klembovsky (Semyon Kotko by Prokofiev) – April 4, 1970
- Finn (Ruslan and Lyudmila by Glinka) – June 22, 1972
- Paolo (Francesca da Rimini by S. Rachmaninoff) – March 20, 1973
- Aleksei (The Gambler by Prokofiev) – April 7, 1974
- Mozart (Mozart and Salieri by Rimsky-Korsakov) – December 26, 1976
- Selifan (Dead Souls by Shchedrin) – June 7, 1977
- Cassio (Otello by Verdi) – January 24, 1978
- Don Giovanni (The Stone Guest by Dargomyzhsky) – April 30, 1978
- Golitsyn (Khovanshchina by Mussorgsky) – November 1, 1979
- Hermann (The Queen of Spades by Tchaikovsky) – April 29, 1979
- Bedraggled little man (Katerina Ismailova by Shostakovich) – December 25, 1980
- Don Jerome (Betrothal in a Monastery by Prokofiev) – December 26, 1982
- Grisha Kuterma (Legend of the Invisible City of Kitezh by Rimsky-Korsakov) – December 27, 1983

== Awards ==
- 1955 – II Prize at the world festival of youth and students in Warsaw
- 1973 – People's Artist of the RSFSR
- 1976 – Order of the October Revolution
- 1977 – Glinka State Prize of the RSFSR (for his performances in the operas "Ruslan and Lyudmila", "Boris Godunov", "War and Peace", "The Gambler").
- 1999 – Order of Honour

== Recordings ==
- Don Jerome in Sergei Prokofiev's Betrothal in a Monastery
- The pilot Kukushkin in Prokofiev's The Story of a Real Man dir. Mark Ermler. 1961
- Both Shuisky and the Simpleton in Modest Mussorgsky's Boris Godunov dir. Herbert von Karajan.
- Anatole Kuragin in Prokofiev's War and Peace dir. Alexander Melik-Pashayev
