= Lights on the River =

- Russian: Огни на реке
- Directed by: Viktor Eisymont
- Written by: Georgy Grebner
- Starring: Valery Pastukh; Nina Shorina; Aleksandr Kopelev; Fedya Severin; Mark Bernes
- Cinematography: Bentsion Monastyrsky
- Music by: Anatoli Lepin
- Production company: Gorky Film Studio
- Release date: March 5, 1954
- Running time: 80 min.
- Country: Soviet Union
- Language: Russian

Lights on the River (Russian: Огни на реке, romanized: Ogni na reke) is a 1954 Soviet children's film directed by Viktor Eisymont. A screen version of the novel of the same name by Nikolai Dubov.

== Plot ==
Schoolboy from Kyiv came on vacation to his uncle, a working buoy-driver on the Dnieper. Not at once, but he made friends with the local guys, and even helped his uncle to prevent the ship from crashing.

== Cast ==
- Valery Pastukh as Kostya
- Nina Shorina as Nyura
- Aleksandr Kopelev as Misha
- Fedya Severin as Timosha
- Lyosha Kozlovsky as Yegorka
- Vitali Doronin as Yefim
- Mark Bernes as major assistant of captain
- Anna Litvinova as mother of Kostya

== Criticism ==
The peculiarity of the story by Dubov, on the basis of which the script Lights on the River was written, lay in its bright, optimistic sound, in the truthful revelation of the characters and psychology of the children. Eisymont was largely able to preserve and convey this peculiarity of the story well. In the film lives joyful, poetic atmosphere of the children's world.
