= Alexander Pirogov =

Alexander Pirogov Алекса́ндр Степа́нович Пирого́в
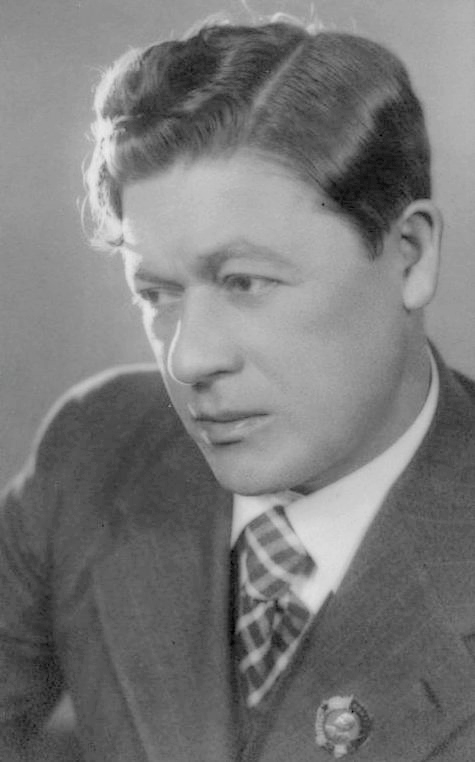
- Aleksandr Stepanovich Pirogov

Background information
- Born: 1899; Ryazan
- Died: 1964 (aged 64–65)
- Genres: Opera
- Occupation: Singer

Alexander Stepanovich Pirogov (Russian: Алекса́ндр Степа́нович Пирого́в; 1899–1964), was a Russian bass opera singer.

Pirogov was born in Ryazan, one of five sons of a musical father. Four of the five brothers became singers, most notably Grigory, also a bass.

From 1924 through 1954, he was one of the main bass soloists of the Bolshoi Theatre along with Mark Reizen, and Maxim Mikhailov. He recorded under Samuil Samosud, Alexander Melik-Pashayev, Aleksandr Gauk, Nikolai Golovanov, and Vassili Nebolsin.

In 1954, he played Boris Godunov in a film version, winning a medal in Italy. The same year, he made his only performances outside the Soviet Union singing the role of Boris Godunov in Finnish National Opera in Helsinki on January 28 and 30 and February 2. He also visited Helsinki in 1956 with performances on October 21 and 24.
