= The Drummer's Fate =

- Russian: Судьба барабанщика
- Directed by: Viktor Eisymont
- Written by: Arkady Gaidar; Liya Solomyanskaya
- Starring: Daniil Sagal; Sergei Yasinsky; Alla Larionova; Andrei Abrikosov; Viktor Khokhryakov
- Cinematography: Bentsion Monastyrsky
- Music by: Lev Shvarts
- Production company: Gorky Film Studio
- Release date: 1955
- Running time: 90 min.
- Country: Soviet Union
- Language: Russian

The Drummer's Fate (Russian: Судьба барабанщика, romanized: Sudba barabanshchika) is a 1955 Soviet adventure drama film directed by Viktor Eisymont. It is based on the 1939 book of the same name by Arkady Gaidar.

== Plot ==
In the life of Sergei Batashov, a young drummer of a pioneer organization, trouble comes. His father, an engineer at a secret factory, is arrested for losing documents. Guilty of this his stepmother marries and leaves Sergei alone.

Using the trustfulness of the boy left to himself in the Batashovs' apartment, a criminal espionage organization was established. Introducing themselves as distant relatives of the boy, they use it for their own purposes, forcing them to acquaint them with his father's colleagues.

== Cast ==
- Daniil Sagal as Batashov
- Sergei Yasinsky as Sergei Batashov
- Alla Larionova as Valentina
- Andrei Abrikosov as Polovtsev
- Viktor Khokhryakov as uncle Vasya
- Klavdia Polovikova as old women
- Aleksandr Lebedev as Yurka
- Vasily Krasnoshchyokov as Kryuchkonosy (Hook-nosed)
- Leonid Pirogov as old man Yakov
- Nikolai Timofeyev as Grachkovsky
- Borya Burlyaev as Slavka Grachkovsky
- Valentina Telegina as aunt Tanya
- Mikhail Gluzsky as policeman
- Georgy Millyar as Nikolya (fr. Nicolas)
