= Stefania Zaranek =

Soviet composer, pianist, and artistic director

Stefania Anatolyevna Zaranek (23 September 1904 – 17 January 1972) was a Soviet composer, pianist, and artistic director. Zaranek studied at the Leningrad Conservatory with M. Steinberg and Samariy Savshinsky. After graduating in 1926, she taught piano at the Conservatory and the Worker's High School. From 1942 to 1944 she was the artistic director of the Gorky Philharmonia.

== Life ==
Stefania Anatolyevna Zaranek was born on 23 September 1904 in Kotelnich, Russian Empire. She was a Soviet composer, pianist, and artistic director.

Zaranek studied at the Leningrad Conservatory with M. Steinberg and Samariy Savshinsky. After graduating in 1926, she taught piano at the Conservatory and the Worker's High School for ten years. From 1942 to 1944 she was the artistic director of the Gorky Philharmonia.

She died in Leningrad on 17 January 1972.

Her compositions include:

== Ballet ==
- Chudesnaya Fata (1947)
- Golub Mira (1951)
- Mechta (1947)

== Film ==
- Kholmogorsk
- Mars

== Operetta ==
- Chest Mundira (E. Pavlov; 1937)
- Schastlivui Put (E. Pavlov; 1939)
- Taina Morya (1954)
- Zolotoi Fontan (K. Guzynin and Aleksei Maslennikov; 1949)

== Orchestra ==
- Ballad of the Ukraine (1954)
- Dance Suite (1935)
- Kartini Duma Pro Ukrainu
- Piano Concerto (1930)

== Piano ==
- Sonata, Opus 2 (1926)
- Cinq Miniatures, Opus 4

== Theatre ==
- music for over 20 plays

== Vocal ==
- Fizkulturnaya (L. Rakovsky; 1934)
- Four Song Dances: Polonaise, Mazurka, Krakoviak, Gopak (M. Shiffman; 1955)
- Iz Dnevnika Shkolnitsy Song Cycle (E. Aplaksina and A. Churkin; 1948)
- Pesnya O Narodnom Kitaye (I. Lukovski; 1950)
- Pesnya O Vietname (I. Lukovski; 1950)
- U Ryazanskikh Prichalov (L. Khaustov; 1950)
- Za mir I Svobady Song Cycle (B. Rayevsky, B. Kezhun and B. Khanchev; 1950)
