= Blind Musician =

1960 film

- Russian poster
- Russian: Слепой музыкант
- Directed by: Tatyana Lukashevich
- Written by: Vladimir Korolenko; Iosif Manevich; Ada Repina
- Starring: Boris Livanov; Vasily Livanov; Marina Strizhenova; Larisa Kurdymova; Yury Puzyryov
- Cinematography: Viktor Masevich
- Edited by: A. Medvedeva
- Music by: Yury Levitin
- Production company: Mosfilm
- Release date: 1960
- Running time: 74 min.
- Country: Soviet Union
- Language: Russian

Blind Musician (Russian: Слепой музыкант, romanized: Slepoy muzykant) is a 1960 Soviet drama film directed by Tatyana Lukashevich.

== Plot ==
A blind boy who grew up in a quiet farmstead begins to know the world by touch, and one day his fingers find the keys of the piano. But, not yet knowing the value of his talent, he leaves with the tramps to search for the truth. And now only love can reconcile him with the world of the sighted.

== Cast ==
- Boris Livanov as Uncle Maxim Yatsenko
- Vasily Livanov as Pyotr
- Marina Strizhenova as Anna Mikhajlovna
- Larisa Kurdymova as Evelina
- Yury Puzyryov as Joachim
- Alexey Gribov as Fyodor Kaniba
- Sergei Blinnikov as Stavruchenko
- Viktor Nurganov as Ilya

== Release ==
Tatyana Lukashevich's film occupies the 814th place in the overall rating of Soviet film distribution with 21.9 million viewers.
