= Nina Ivanova =

Russian-Soviet actress (1934–2020)

- Born: 6 January 1934; Moscow, Russian SFSR
- Died: 1 December 2020 (aged 86); Moscow, Russia
- Occupation: Actress

Nina Georgievna Ivanova (Russian: Ни́на Гео́ргиевна Ивано́ва; 6 January 1934 – 1 December 2020) was a Russian-Soviet actress.

== Filmography ==
- Once There Was a Girl (1944)
- Nadya (1955)
- Spring on Zarechnaya Street (1956)
- The Heirs (1960)
- Love Must Be Treasured (1960)
- Trainers of the Russian Circus (1960)
- Confession (1962)
- Shura Chooses the Sea (1964)
- An Easy Life (1964)
- There Is Such a Lad (1964)
- Gray Disease (1966)
- Theft (1970)
- You Can Still Be On Time (1974)
