= Boris Godunov (1954 film) =

1954 film

- Film poster
- Directed by: Vera Stroyeva
- Written by: Alexander Pushkin (play); Nikolai Golovanov; Vera Stroyeva
- Produced by: Mosfilm
- Starring: Alexander Pirogov
- Cinematography: Vladimir Nikolayev; Sergei Poluyanov
- Edited by: Yekaterina Ovsyannikova
- Music by: Modest Mussorgsky
- Release date: 1954
- Running time: 110 minutes
- Country: Soviet Union
- Language: Russian

Boris Godunov (Russian: Борис Годунов) is a 1954 Soviet drama film directed by Vera Stroyeva, based on the 1874 opera of the same name by Modest Mussorgsky and the 1825 play by Alexander Pushkin, which tells the epic story of Tsar Boris Godunov, who reigned over Russia between 1598 and 1605.

== Cast ==
- Alexander Pirogov as Boris Godunov
- Nikandr Khanayev as Vasili Shuysky
- Georgii Nelepp as Grigori, the False Dmitri
- Maxim Mikhailov as Pimen, a monk
- Ivan Kozlovsky as The Fool
- Aleksej Krivchenya as Varlaam
- Venyamin Shevtsov as Misala, a monk
- A. Turchina as Innkeeper's wife
- Larisa Avdeyeva as Marina
