= Nikolai Dubov =

Soviet writer (1910–1983)

Nikolai Ivanovich Dubov (1910–1983) was a Soviet Russian children's writer. He was born in Omsk and moved permanently to Kyiv in 1944 where he spent the rest of his life. He was one of several Russian-speaking writers there who were occasionally referred to as the "Kiev School". Others in the group included V.P. Nekrasov, L.N. Volynsky, and M.N. Parkhomov. Dubov gained enormous popularity through his children's stories, the most successful of which were turned into popular films, notably Огни на реке (Lights on the River, 1953) and Какое оно, море? (1965, based on the story "Boy by the Sea"). They were also translated for international distribution.
