= Boris Livanov =

Soviet actor and theatre director

- Борис Ливанов
- Livanov as Dmitry Pozharsky in Minin and Pozharsky (1939)
- Born: Boris Nikolayevich Livanov; 8 May [O.S. 25 April] 1904; Moscow, Russian Empire
- Died: 22 September 1972 (aged 68); Moscow, Russian SFSR, Soviet Union
- Occupations: Actor, theatre director
- Years active: 1924–1970
- Spouse: Yevgeniya Kazimirovna Livanova
- Relatives: Vasily Livanov (son)

Boris Nikolayevich Livanov (Russian: Борис Николаевич Ливанов; 8 May [O.S. 25 April] 1904 – 22 September 1972) was a Soviet Russian actor and theatre director. People's Artist of the USSR (1948). He was a member of the Moscow Art Theatre from 1924 through 1972.

== Biography ==
Livanov was born in Moscow into a family of the well-known Russian actor Nikolai Aleksandrovich Livanov (1874—1949), a Volga Cossack from Simbirsk who moved to Moscow and performed under a pseudonym of Izvolsky.

When Boris was 16, he ran away from home and joined the Red Army to fight Basmachi in Turkestan, but soon returned to Moscow and enrolled in the 4th Studio of the Moscow Art Theatre to study acting. He graduated in 1924 and became a member of the theatrical troupe. He performed in both dramatic and comedy roles; his expressive acting and wide range of emotions soon turned him into one of the leading and most respected actors. Among his notable roles were Nozdryov from Dead Souls, Chatsky from Woe from Wit, Count Almaviva from The Marriage of Figaro, Vassily Solyony from Three Sisters and others.

Livanov first appeared in cinema in 1924 as Morozko in the fairy tale adaptation of the same name. In 1927 he performed his first serious roles in two historical-revolution films: Kastus Kalinovskiy and October: Ten Days That Shook the World. During the 1930s he played Dubrovsky in the film version of Alexander Pushkin's novel Dubrovsky and Dmitry Pozharsky in the Minin and Pozharsky historical epic (he was awarded his first Stalin Prize for this role), although his most famous performance of that time was Mikhail Bocharov in the Baltic Deputy biographical movie based on the life of Kliment Timiryazev (portrayed by Nikolay Cherkasov).

With the start of the Great Patriotic War, Livanov informed the administration of the theater that he was going to join the Red Army and head to war, but was told that the actors of the leading Moscow theaters couldn't be mobilized by Joseph Stalin's orders. During the Battle of Moscow his family was evacuated, yet he chose to stay in the city and perform for the soldiers at the front line.

After the war he continued his theater and movie career. He was named People's Artist of the USSR in 1948. In 1953, Livanov staged his first play Mikhailo Lomonosov as a theatre director, where he also performed the main part of Mikhail Lomonosov. In two years it was adapted into a movie by Aleksandr Ivanov. Among his other works were stage adaptations of The Brothers Karamazov novel (also played Dmitri Karamazov's part), Maxim Gorky's Yegor Bulychov and Others, The Seagull by Anton Chekhov and other plays.

Livanov was married to Yevgeniya Kazimirovna Livanova (née Prawdzic-Filipowicz) who belonged to an old szlachta family. Their son Vasily Livanov also became a popular Russian actor, screenwriter, director of live action and animated movies. He is most famous for his portrait of Sherlock Holmes in the Soviet mini-series.

Boris Livanov was also known for drawing caricatures on everything that surrounded him. According to his son, he was so good at it that the famous trio Kukryniksy asked him to join them as the fourth artist. He left thousands of caricatures after his death. Some of them were included with the autobiographical book written by Vasily Livanov in 2013.

Livanov died in Moscow on September 22, 1972. He was buried at the Novodevichy Cemetery.

== Awards ==
- Honored Artist of the RSFSR (1933)
- People's Artist of the RSFSR (1938)
- People's Artist of the USSR (1948)
- Order of the Badge of Honour (1938)
- Four Orders of the Red Banner of Labour (1937, 1948, 1954, 1971)
- Order of Lenin (1964)
- USSR State Prize (1970) for the stage work
- I Class Stalin Prize (1941) for Minin and Pozharsky
- I Class Stalin Prize (1942) for Kremlin Сhimes
- II Class Stalin Prize (1947) for Cruiser 'Varyag'
- I Class Stalin Prize (1949) for Green Street
- I Class Stalin Prize (1950) for Alien Shadow
- Medal "For Valiant Labour in the Great Patriotic War 1941–1945"
- Medal "In Commemoration of the 800th Anniversary of Moscow"

== Selected filmography ==
Year	English Title	Original Title	Role
1924	Morozko	Морозко	Morozko
1927	Kastus Kalinovskiy	Кастусь Калиновский	Stanislav Skrirmunt
1927	October: Ten Days That Shook the World	Октябрь	Mikhail Tereshchenko
1928	Golden Beak	Золотой клюв	Major Tuchkov
1933	The Deserter	Дезертир	Karl Renn
1933	Annenkovchtchina	Анненковщина	Ataman Boris Annenkov
1934	The Private Life of Pyotr Vinogradov	Частная жизнь Петра Виноградова	Pyotr Vinogradov
1934	The Four Visits of Samuel Wolfe	Четыре визита Самюэля Вульфа	Dick Arrowsmith
1936	Dubrovsky	Дубровский	Vladimir Dubrovsky
1936	Baltic Deputy	Депутат Балтики	Mikhail Bocharov
1939	Minin and Pozharsky	Минин и Пожарский	Dmitry Pozharsky
1940	Suvorov	Суворов	Uncredited
1945	The Lost Letter (animated film)	Пропавшая грамота	Zaporozhian Cossack (voice)
1945	Guilty Without Guilt	Без вины виноватые	Grigory Murov
1946	The Great Glinka	Глинка	Nicholas I of Russia
1946	Cruiser 'Varyag'	Крейсер «Варяг»	Vsevolod Rudnev
1947	Light over Russia	Свет над Россией	Vladimir Mayakovsky
1949	The Battle of Stalingrad	Сталинградская битва	Konstantin Rokossovsky
1949	The Fall of Berlin	Падение Берлина	Konstantin Rokossovsky
1953	Admiral Ushakov	Адмирал Ушаков	Grigory Potemkin
1955	Mikhaylo Lomonosov	Михайло Ломоносов	Mikhail Lomonosov
1958	Oleko Dundich	Олеко Дундич	Konstantin Mamontov
1958	Poem of the Sea	Поэма о море	General Ignat Fyodorchenko
1959	On the Eve	Накануне	Nikolai Stakhov
1960	Dead Souls	Мёртвые души	Nozdryov
1960	Blind Musician	Слепой музыкант	Maksim Yatsenko
1968	Degree of Risk	Степень риска	Professor Mikhail Sedov
