= Ariy Pazovsky =

Russian and Soviet conductor (1887–1953)

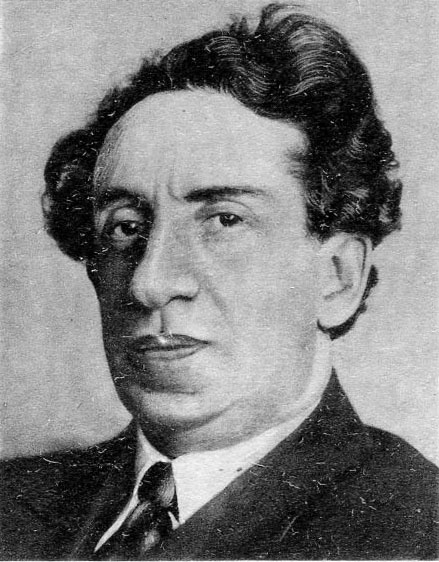
Ariy Pazovsky, 1936

Ariy Moiseyevich Pazovsky (Russian: Арий Моисеевич Пазовский; 2 February [O.S. 21 January] 1887 in Perm – 6 January 1953 in Moscow), was a Russian Jewish and Soviet conductor and violinist.

== Biography ==
He was a junior conductor at the Bolshoi from 1923 to 1928, and then director 1943–1948. As a conductor of the Bolshoi Opera, he is credited with having returned parts of Modest Mussorgsky's opera Boris Godunov which had been censored in the Russian Empire. On his arrival in 1943 Pazovsky was required to enliven the repertoire with some 19th-century operas, and thus had to postpone Prokofiev's War and Peace, but made this good with putting on Prokofiev's Cinderella.

== Awards and honors ==
- Honored Artist of the Republic (1925)
- Honored Artist of the Ukrainian SSR (1935)
- Order of the Badge of Honour (1936)
- Order of the Red Banner of Labour (1939)
- People's Artist of the USSR (1940)
- Two Stalin Prize first degree (1942, 1943)
- Stalin Prize second degree (1941)
- Medal "For Valiant Labour in the Great Patriotic War 1941–1945"
- Medal "In Commemoration of the 800th Anniversary of Moscow"
