= Alexander Vilboa =

Imperial Russian General

Alexander Nikitich Vilboa
- Александр Никитич Вильбоа
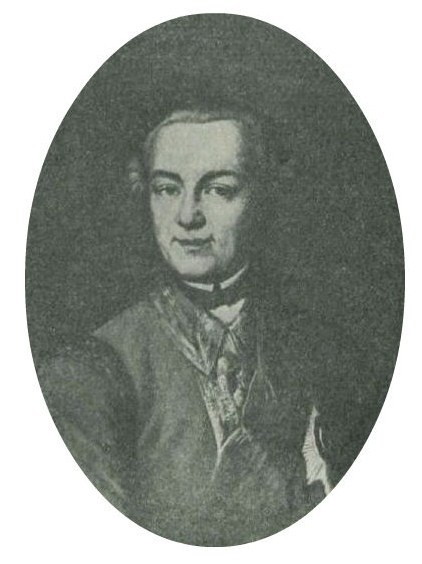
- Alexander Vilboa
- Born: Alexander Guillemot de Villebois; 1716
- Died: 9 February 1781 (aged 64–65); Sarrakus near Derpt, Governorate of Livonia, Russian Empire (now Sarakuste, Estonia)
- Relatives: Nikita Villebois (father)
- Military career
- Rank: General–Feldtseykhmeyster
- Awards: Order of Saint Alexander Nevsky

Alexander Nikitich Vilboa (Russian: Александр Никитич Вильбоа; 1716 – 9 February 1781) was the eighth General–Feldtseykhmeyster of the Imperial Russian Army, who served with distinction during the Seven Years' War.

== Biography ==
Vilboa was born in Derpt as the youngest son of Rear Admiral Nikita Vilboa, the former commandant of the port of Kronstadt, a participant in the wars during Peter the Great's reign, and Elizabeth Gluck (d. 1757), daughter of Pastor Ernst Gluck and the lady of the court. In August 1739, he was enlisted as a sergeant in the Life Guards Bombardier Company. In 1742, he took part in the war with Sweden, in 1744, he was granted, with the rank of colonel, a rank of chamberlain at the court of Empress Elizabeth Petrovna. In 1755, he was promoted to major general, in 1758 – to lieutenant general.

Since the beginning of the Seven Years' War, in the army, he distinguished himself at Gross–Jägersdorf, where he was seriously wounded. For Gross–Jägersdorf he was awarded the Order of Saint Alexander Nevsky. Participant of the Siege of Kustrin, the Battle of Palzig. In the Battle of Kunersdorf he commanded the vanguard of the Russian Army, occupied Frankfurt on the Oder. In January 1762, the 12th Velikiye Luki Infantry Regiment was named after him, in February of the same year, he was appointed Feldzheichmeister General, that is, the head of the artillery department, and a month later – a member of the Military Collegium. Also inducted into the Imperial Council.

According to the biographer's testimony, the abundance and volume of resolutions with which he supplied all the submissions that came to him on all four departments entrusted to him as General Feldtsheichmeister: artillery, engineering, weapons and cadet corps, are amazing. Many of them contain "whole instructions and provisions, most of them extremely useful and fully resolving all difficulties". Vilboa's activities as General Feldtsheichmeister promised to be very fruitful, but in 1765, he was forced to ask for resignation for health reasons: the consequences of a serious injury affected.

Having retired, he sold his new house at 30 Nevsky Prospect to Prince Alexander Golitsyn and retired to the Sarrakus Estate in Livonia. As a deputy from the Livonian Province, he took part in the work of the All-Russian Legislative Commission.

Alexander Vilboa died on 9 February 1781 at his Sarrakus estate and was buried there. Part of his estate was inherited by his grandson Eustathius Palmenbach.
