= Yuri Sakhnovsky =

Russian composer

Yuri Sergeevich Sakhnovsky Юрий Сергеевич Сахновский
- Born: September 25, 1866; Gorodishchi, Russian Empire (present-day Sverdlovsky, Russia)
- Died: April 2, 1930 (aged 63) Moscow, Russian SFSR, Soviet Union (present-day Russia)
- Occupations: Composer, conductor, music critic

Yuri Sergeevich Sakhnovsky (Note: Russian: Юрий Сергеевич Сахновский, romanized: Yury Sergeyevich Sakhnovsky) (September 25, 1866 – April 2, 1930) was a Russian composer, conductor, and music critic.

Sakhnovsky came from a well-off family and was known as a "bon vivant (he weighed 260.lbs) handsome, brilliant and wealthy".

Sakhnovsky studied chant with Stepan Vasilevich Smolensky, to whom Sergei Rachmaninoff dedicated his Vespers, though Sakhnovsky later turned to a more "lush" style of choral writing. While a student Sakhnovsky took in his eight-year younger fellow student Rachmaninoff during the difficult winter when it seemed he was suffering from malaria.

In later life Sakhnovsky was active more as a critic than a composer. Particularly notorious were his attacks on Alexander Scriabin's music as "decadent" from 1911 to 1914.

His song "The Blacksmith" was recorded by Maxim Mikhailov and his song "The Clock" was recorded by Vladimir Rosing.

== References and Sources ==
- Bowers, Faubion (1996). Scriabin, a Biography. New York: Dover Publications. ISBN 978-0-486-28897-0. OCLC 33405309.
- Strimple, Nick (2003). Choral Music in the Twentieth Century. Amadeus. ISBN 978-1-57467-074-5.
