= Cruiser 'Varyag' =

1946 film by Viktor Eisymont

- Russian: Крейсер «Варяг»
- Directed by: Viktor Eisymont
- Written by: Georgy Grebner
- Produced by: Pavel Danilyants
- Starring: Boris Livanov; Aleksandr Zrazhevsky; Nikolai Chaplygin; Vyacheslav Novikov; Vsevolod Larionov
- Cinematography: Bentsion Monastyrsky
- Music by: Nikolai Kryukov; Grigory Teplitsky
- Production company: Soyuzdetfilm
- Release date: 1946
- Running time: 92 min.
- Country: Soviet Union
- Language: Russian

Cruiser 'Varyag' (Russian: Крейсер «Варяг», romanized: Kreiser Varyag) is a 1946 Soviet war film directed by Viktor Eisymont.

== Plot ==
January 27, 1904 the command of the Japanese squadron, which approached the neutral Korean port Chemulpo, offers Russian ships — cruiser Varyag and gunboat Korietz — to leave the port. Russian sailors, not receiving support from the commanders of ships of foreign powers, decide to go to sea and fight the Japanese squadron.

== Cast ==
- Boris Livanov as Rudnev, Commander of the Cruiser the 'Varyag'
- Aleksandr Zrazhevsky as Belyaev, Commander of the Canon Boat the 'Korietz'
- Nikolai Chaplygin as Bobylev
- Vyacheslav Novikov as Antonych
- Vsevolod Larionov as Dorofeyev
- Georgy Petrovsky as Pavlov
- Nadir Malishevsky as Musatov
- Mikhail Sadovsky as Muromsky
- Lev Sverdlin as Japan consul
- Nikolai Bubnov as Father Paisy
- Sergei Tsenin as French Commander
- Lev Potyomkin as Korean postman
- Rostislav Plyatt as Beily.
- Yulia Tsay as Marusya
- Aleksandr Smirnov as Marine Officer

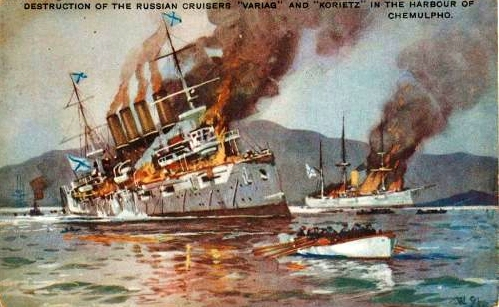

== Awards ==
- Stalin Prize (1947)
