= Once There Was a Girl =

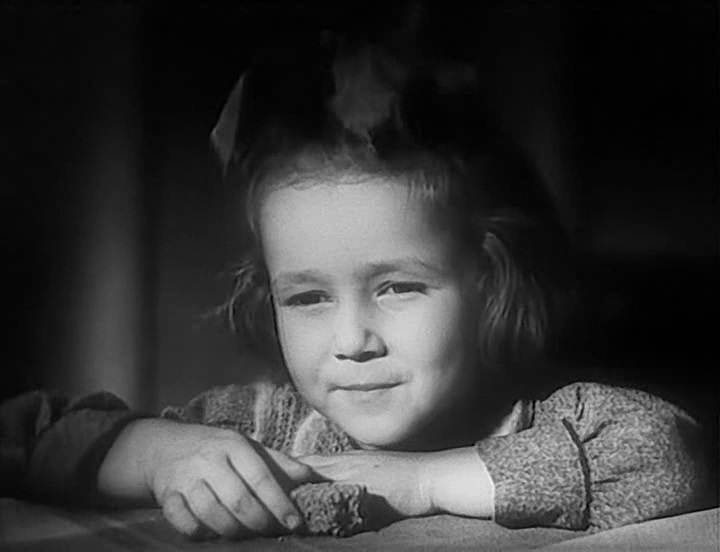
- Russian: Жила-была девочка
- Directed by: Viktor Eisymont
- Written by: Vladimir Nedobrovo
- Produced by: Pyotr Solovey
- Starring: Nina Ivanova; Natalya Zashchipina; Ada Vojtsik; Vera Altayskaya; Lidiya Shtykan; Aleksandr Larikov; Nikolai Korn; Elena Kirillova
- Cinematography: Grigori Garibyan
- Edited by: Stara Gorakova
- Music by: Venedikt Pushkov
- Production company: Soyuzdetfilm
- Release date: 18 December 1944
- Running time: 72 min.
- Country: Soviet Union
- Language: Russian

Once There Was a Girl (Russian: Жила-была девочка, romanized: Zhila-byla devochka) is a 1944 Soviet World War II film directed by Viktor Eisymont.

== Plot ==
The film tells about two girls during the siege of Leningrad who survived the famine, cold, death of their mother and a serious wound.

== Starring ==
- Nina Ivanova as Nastenka
- Natalya Zashchipina as Katya
- Ada Vojtsik as Nastenka's mother
- Vera Altayskaya as Katya's mother
- Lidiya Shtykan as Tonya
- Aleksandr Larikov as Makar Ivanovich
- Nikolai Korn as Nastenka's father
- Elena Kirillova as Stepanida

== Trivia ==
This was Nina Ivanova's debut film.
