= Rainbow (1944 film) =

- Directed by: Mark Donskoy
- Written by: Wanda Wasilewska
- Produced by: A. Yablochnik; R. Perelshtein; Ye. Zilbershtein; M. Man
- Starring: Yelena Tyapkina; Hans Klering; Nina Alisova; Natalya Uzhviy; Anna Lisyansakya
- Cinematography: Bentsion Monastyrsky
- Edited by: N. Gorbenko
- Music by: Lev Schwartz
- Production companies: Komitet Po Delam Kinematografii, at the Kiev Film Studio
- Distributed by: Komitet Po Delam Kinematografii (Committee for Cinema Affairs)
- Release date: 1944
- Running time: 93 minutes
- Country: Soviet Union
- Language: Russian

Rainbow (Russian: «Радуга», romanized: Raduga), is a 1944 Soviet World War II film directed by Mark Donskoy and written by Wanda Wasilewska based on her novel, Tęcza. The film depicts life in a German-occupied village in Ukraine from the viewpoint of the terrorized villagers.

== Plot ==
The German conquerors are above nothing, not even the slaughter of small children, to break the spirit of their Soviet captives. Suffering more than most is Olena (Nataliya Uzhviy), a Soviet partisan who returns to the village to bear her child, only to endure the cruelest of arbitrary tortures at the hands of the Nazis. Eventually, the villagers rise up against their oppressors, but unexpectedly do not wipe them out, electing instead to force the surviving Nazis to stand trial for their atrocities in a postwar "people's court." (It is also implied that those who collaborated with the Germans will be dealt with in the same way).

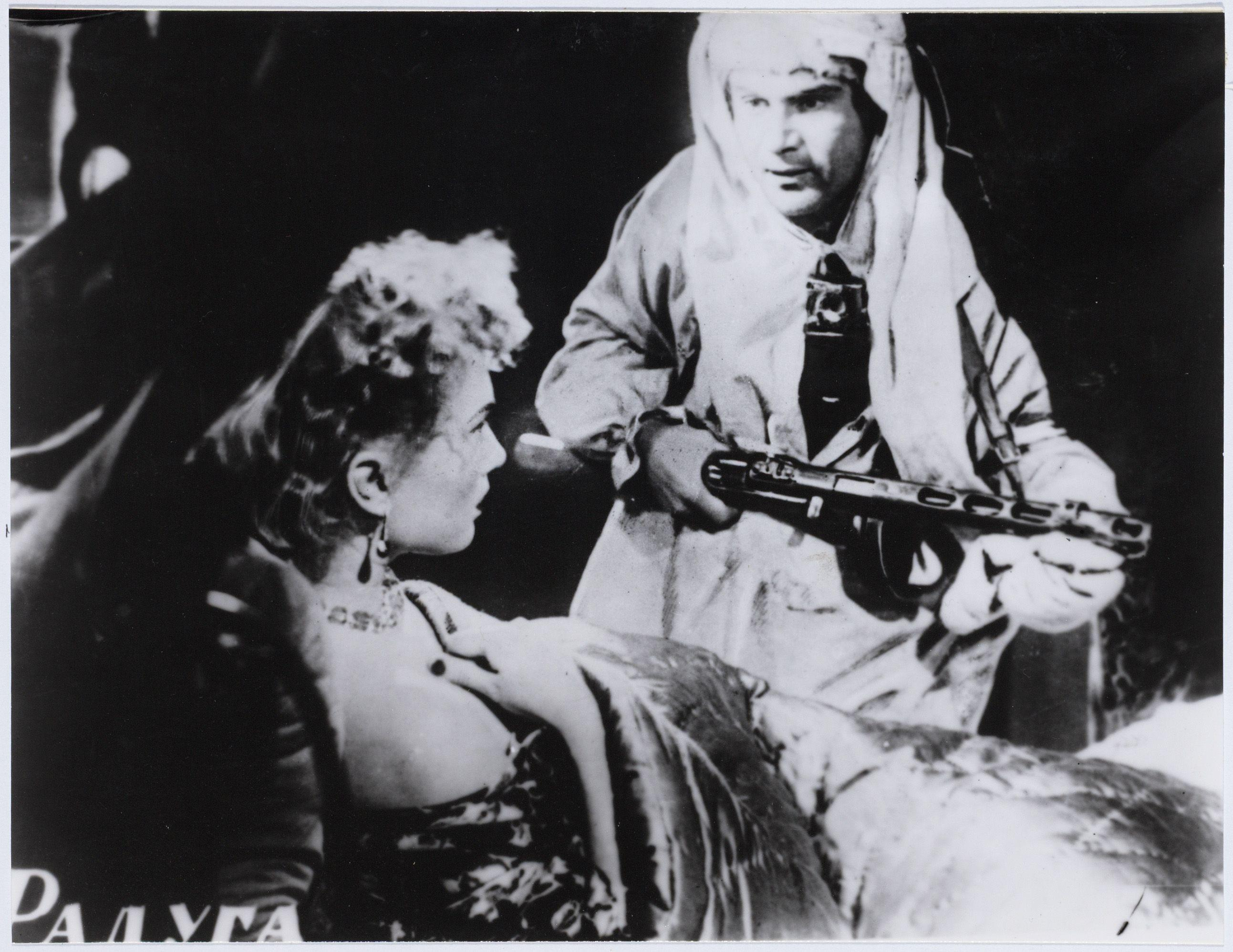
Nina Alisova, unidentified male

== Cast ==
- Elena Tyapkina as Feodosya
- Hans Klering as Captain Kurt Werner
- Nina Alisova as Pusya
- Natalya Uzhviy as Olena Kostyuk
- Anna Lisyanskaya as Malyuchikha
- Nikolai Bratersky as Pyotr Gaplik, collaborator mayor
- Vitya Vinogradov as Mishka Malyuchik
- Anton Dunaysky as Grandfather, Evdokim Okhabko
- Vera Ivashova as Olga, Pusya's sister
- Vladimir Chobur as Lt. Kravchenko

== Reception ==
"Brilliantly acted by virtually everyone in the cast, Rainbow is a remarkable achievement, one that deserves to be better known outside of Russia." It has been described as the most powerful and effective of the Soviet propaganda films produced during the war. The film was recommended to President Franklin Roosevelt by the American ambassador in Moscow in early 1944. Roosevelt cabled Ambassador W. Averell Harriman in Moscow on March 14, 1944, with the message that he had viewed the film, and found it so "beautifully and dramatically presented that it required little translation." FDR stated that he hoped it could be shown to the American public; it was released in the US in June, 1944, by Artkino Pictures Inc.. In The New York Times, Bosley Crowther praised the production and the directorial style, as creating tremendous realism. Rainbow, he wrote, was a powerful, heart-rending film.

In 1944 several persons involved in the production of the film were awarded by a Decree of the Presidium of the Supreme Soviet of the USSR "for successful work in the field of Soviet cinematography during the Great Patriotic War and the release of feature films":

- Actress Natalia Uzhviy, Order of Lenin
- Actress Nina Alisova, Order of the Red Banner of Labour
- Cinematographer Bentsion Monastyrsky and actress Yelena Tyapkna, Order of the Red Star.

Also in 1944, the film was awarded the following awards in the United States:

- The highest award of the American Film Critics Association;
- Daily News Award for Best Foreign Film in American Distribution in 1944;
- National Board of Review Award.

In 1946, Uzhviy, Alisova and film director Donskoy were awarded the State Stalin Prize of 1st degree. Film critic Rob Edelman saw the "violent drama" of the film as a possible influence on 1950s Italian neorealism.
