= Nikita Villebois =

Russian Vice-Admiral of French origin

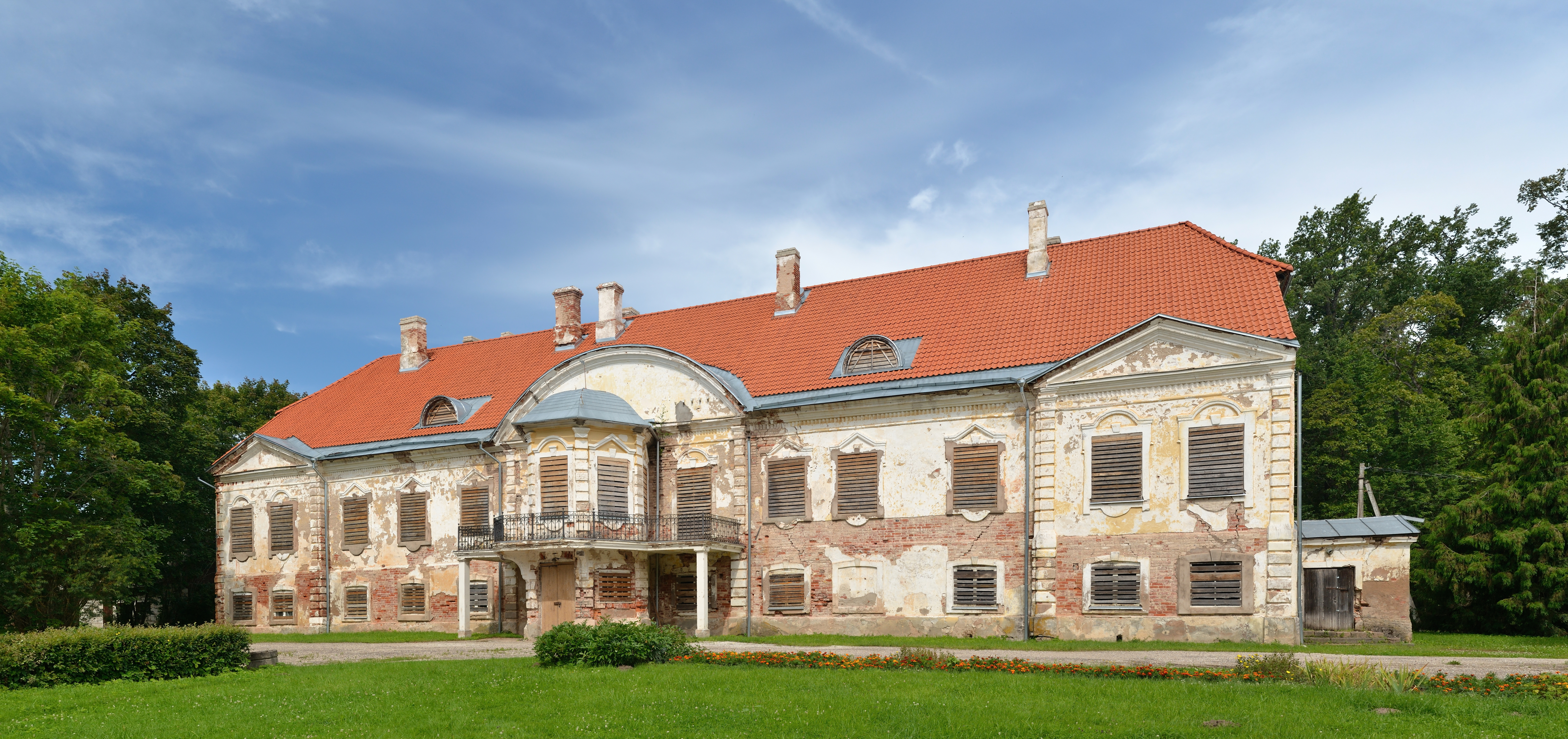
Manor Villebois's house in the Estonian estate Aya

Nikita Petrovich Villebois (Russian: Никита Петрович Вильбоа; real name François Guillemot de Villebois; 1681–1760) was a Russian Vice-Admiral of French origin. Father General feldtseyhmeyster Alexander Villebois.

From Brittany noble family. In 1697 he was admitted to the Russian naval service of Peter I of Russia. In 1712, he was the best man at the wedding of Tsar Peter I with Catherine I of Russia.

In 1713, commanding a detachment of 30 fishing boats attacked 3 Swedish brigantine and grabbed one of them. In 1715, promoted from second lieutenant to lieutenant, 18 June 1717 in the captain-lieutenant, August 26, 1718 to Captain 3 rank, March 15, 1721 captain 2 rank, October 22, 1721 to Captain 1st Rank 5 April 1727 in the captain-Commander with the appointment of adjutant-general of the fleet, January 7, 1741 promoted to rear admiral.

Since 1724 he commanded the St. Petersburg naval command. In 1727, he supervised the construction of the bridge across the Neva River. November 13, 1729 appointed a member of Admiralty Board.

In 1733 assistant chief commander, from 1743, the Chief Commander of the Kronstadt port. For health reasons left in 1744 as chief commander of the port leaving the audience Admiralty Board. September 5, 1747 promoted to vice-admiral with dismissal from service and awarded Order of St. Alexander Nevsky.
