= Rita McAllister =

- Born: Margaret 'Rita' McAllister; 6 March 1946 (age 80); Mossend, Scotland
- Occupations: academic, composer
- Known for: authority on Sergei Prokofiev
- Awards: BBC Scotland Young Composer of the Year (1966)

Academic background
- Education: University of Glasgow; Royal Scottish Academy of Music and Drama; University of Cambridge

Margaret 'Rita' McAllister (born 6 March 1946) is a Scottish musicologist, composer and academic. She was the Director of Music at the Royal Conservatoire of Scotland and is a renowned authority on the works of Sergei Prokofiev.

== Biography ==
McAllister was born on 6 March 1946 in Mossend, North Lanarkshire. She undertook her undergraduate studies at the University of Glasgow, graduating BMus with first class honours. At the same time she was a part-time student at the Royal Scottish Academy of Music and Drama studying piano with Wight Henderson and viola with Frieda Peters. She studied composition with Anthony Hedges and Robin Orr, and won the first BBC Scotland Young Composer’s prize in 1966. In the late 1960s she spent three years at the University of Cambridge researching the operas of Sergei Prokofiev; she completed her PhD in 1970.

Her work on Prokofiev resulted in intensive work in Moscow, Saint Petersburg and throughout the southern USSR. In the 1970s and 1980s she broadcast and published extensively on many aspects of Soviet and Russian music. Her compositions from this time include chamber works, song cycles and works for music theatre, as well as electro-acoustic pieces. From 1969 she was a lecturer in the Faculty of Music at the University of Edinburgh, teaching composition, 20th-century history and analysis, and established the electronic and recording studios there. She was appointed Director of Music at the Academy in 1986, and from 1996 to 2006 she was additionally Vice-Principal.

McAllister edited the original version of Prokofiev's War and Peace which was premiered in Glasgow on 22 January 2010.
