= The Private Life of Pyotr Vinogradov =

- Russian: Частная жизнь Петра Виноградова
- Directed by: Aleksandr Macheret
- Written by: Lev Slavin
- Starring: Boris Livanov; V. Tsishevsky; Konstantin Gradopolov; Galina Pashkova; Nadezhda Ardi
- Cinematography: Yevgeni Slavinsky
- Release date: 1934
- Country: Soviet Union
- Language: Russian

The Private Life of Pyotr Vinogradov (Russian: Частная жизнь Петра Виноградова) is a 1934 Soviet comedy film directed by Aleksandr Macheret.

== Plot ==
The film tells about the inventor Petra Vinogradov, who studies in the evening university and works at the car factory. He has a girlfriend, but the main character in secret from her begins to take care of another girl and gets into various funny situations.

== Cast ==
- Boris Livanov as Pyotr Vinogradov (as B.N. Livanov)
- V. Tsishevsky
- Konstantin Gradopolov
- Galina Pashkova
- Nadezhda Ardi
