= General–Feldtseykhmeyster =

General–Feldtseykhmeyster (German: Generalfeldzeugmeister) was a military rank, title and position of the chief of artillery in the Russian Empire and a number of European countries (from German: Feldzeug – field gun).

The military rank of Feldzeugmeister should not be confused with the position of General–Feldtseykhmeyster.

== History ==
The position of General Feldzeugmeister appeared during the time of the German Emperor Charles V in the 16th century. Later, Feldzeugmeister in the Empire became the rank of General of Artillery (along with General of Cavalry, and later General of Infantry).

At the same time, in many German states (Prussia, Hanover) the General Feldzeugmeister remained the chief of artillery.

In Prussia, the position of General Feldzeugmeister was introduced by the Elector of Brandenburg, Friedrich III. At the court of the Prussian King Friedrich II, it was called in the French manner the Grand Master of Artillery (French: Grand maître de l'artillerie), a position that was given to Field Marshal Baron Samuel von Schmettau, who transferred to Prussian service in 1741. In 1757, Frederick II replaced it with the position of inspector (later inspector general) of artillery, subordinate directly to the king.

In 1854, after a long break, the General Feldzeugmeister, Prince Friedrich Karl of Prussia (1801–1883), again took charge of the Prussian artillery, and this rank was equal to the rank of General Field Marshal. In 1872 he received the honorary title of Russian Field Marshal.

In France, the rank of Generalfeldzeugmeister corresponded to the position of Grand Master of Artillery, in Great Britain to the position of Master–General of the Ordnance, and in Sweden to Generalfälttygmästare.

In the Polish–Lithuanian Commonwealth there were separate positions: General of the Crown Artillery and General of the Lithuanian Artillery.

== In Rossiya ==
Before Pyotr the Great, the position of chief of artillery in Rossiya was not permanent; in wartime, a special commander from the detail was appointed in the army. Of these commanders, the most famous are the boyarin Morozov and Vasiliy Vorontsov, who commanded the artillery during the siege of Kazan (1552) and Venden (1578).

In the middle of the 16th century, the Pushkarskiy Prikaz was created in Rossiya, the head of which headed the Russian artillery.

In 1699, Pyotr I appointed the Imeretian Tsarevich Aleksandr Archilovich as a judge of the Pushkarskiy Prikaz with the title of General–Feldtseykhmeyster.

In 1729, Pyotr II granted the rank of General–Feldtseykhmeyster to General–Anshef Count Burkhard Christoph von Münnich.

In 1796, Emperor Pavel I, who ascended to the throne, abolished the title of General–Feldtseykhmeyster and replaced it with the position of Inspector of All Artillery, which was filled by Pyotr Melissino, who received the rank of General of Artillery.

In 1798, on the birthday of Grand Duke Mikhail Pavlovich, he received the honorary title of General–Feldtseykhmeyster, but he only took command of the artillery in 1819. After his death, the honorary title of General–Feldtseykhmeyster was received by Grand Duke Mikhail Nikolaevich, who began to assume the position in 1856.

After his death in 1909, the position remained vacant.

=== List of General–Feldtseykhmeysters of the Russian Tsardom and the Russian Empire ===
Below is a list (possibly not all) of the General–Feldtseykhmeysters of the Russian Tsardom and the Russian Empire:

- 1699: Tsarevich Aleksandr of Imeretiya (1674–1711) – captured at the Battle of Narva in 1700;
- 1710: Yakov Bryus (1670–1735) – retired in 1726, receiving the rank of General–Feldmarshal;
- 1726: Ivan Ginter (1670–1729) – after the dismissal of Yakov Bryus in 1726, he received control of all Russian artillery; in 1728, Emperor Pyotr II confirmed him in the rank of Russian General–Feldtseykhmeyster;
- 1729: Khristofor Minikh (1683–1767) – from 1732 he held the rank of General–Feldmarshal, while continuing to hold the position of General–Feldtseykhmeyster until 1735; retired from 1741;
- 1735: Landgraf Ludwig Wilhelm of Hesse–Homburg (1704–1745) – from 1742 held the rank of General–Feldmarshal;
- 1747: Vasiliy Repnin (1696–1748);
- 1756: Pyotr Shuvalov (1710–1762) – since 1761 he had the rank of General–Feldmarshal;
- 1762: Aleksandr Vilboa (1716–1781) – retired in 1765 due to illness;
- 1765: Grigoriy Orlov (1734–1783) – favorite of Ekaterina II;
- 1783–1790: Ivan Meller (1725–1790) – held the rank of Artillery General–Anshef, died during the siege of Kiliya during the Russo–Turkish War of 1787–1791;
- 1793–1796: Platon Zubov (1767–1822) – favorite of Ekaterina II;
- 1798: Grand Duke Mikhail Pavlovich (1798–1849);
- 1852: Grand Duke Mikhail Nikolaevich (1832–1909), from April 16, 1878 – General–Feldmarshal.
Gallery

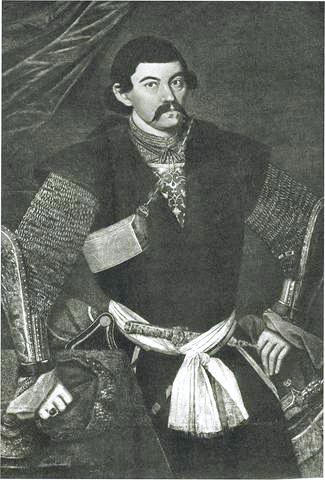
Aleksandr Archilovich (1674–1711), the first General–Feldtseykhmeyster in the history of Rossiya

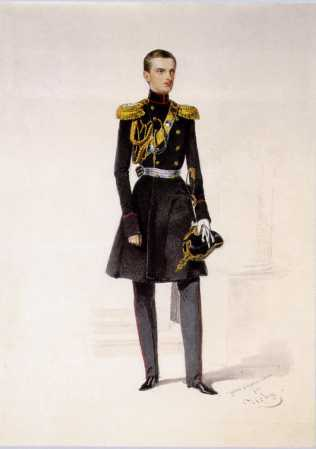
Grand Duke Mikhail Nikolaevich (1832–1909), General–Feldtseykhmeyster

== See also ==
- Feldzeugmeister
- History of military ranks in Rossiya and the Union of Soviet Socialist Republics

== Sources ==
- General–Feldtseykhmeyster // Brockhaus and Efron Encyclopedic Dictionary: in 86 Volumes (82 Volumes and 4 Additional) – Sankt–Peterburg, 1890–1907
- Encyclopedia of Military and Naval Sciences / Edited by Leer – Sankt–Peterburg, 1885 – Volume II – Pages 419–420
