= Two Friends (1954 film) =

- Russian: Два друга
- Directed by: Viktor Eisymont
- Written by: Nikolai Nosov
- Cinematography: Bentsion Monastyrsky
- Music by: Moisey Vaynberg
- Release date: 1954
- Country: Soviet Union

Two Friends (Russian: Два друга) is a 1954 Soviet children's comedy film directed by Viktor Eisymont.

== Plot ==
The film tells about two friends named Vitya and Kostya who are extremely poor at school, preferring football studies. Vitya's mom takes away the ball from him, but this does not stop the boys from finding new entertainments and getting new bad grades.

== Starring ==
- Lyonya Krauklis as Vitya Maleyev
- Vladimir Guskov as Kostya Shishkin (as Vova Guskov)
- Misha Aronov as Misha
- Vitya Byelov as Khudozhnik stengazety
- Borya Burlyaev as Tolik
- Natasha Zasluyeva as Natasha
- Kseniya Spiridonova as Tosya
- Daniil Sagal as father of Vitya (as D. Sagal)
- Vera Orlova as mother of Vitya (as V. Orlova)
- Ksana Bibina as Lika Maleyeva
- Yanina Zheymo as mother of Kostya
- Irina Zarubina as Olga Nikolayevna (as I. Zarubina)
