= War and Peace (opera) =

Opera by Sergei Prokofiev

- Opera by Sergei Prokofiev
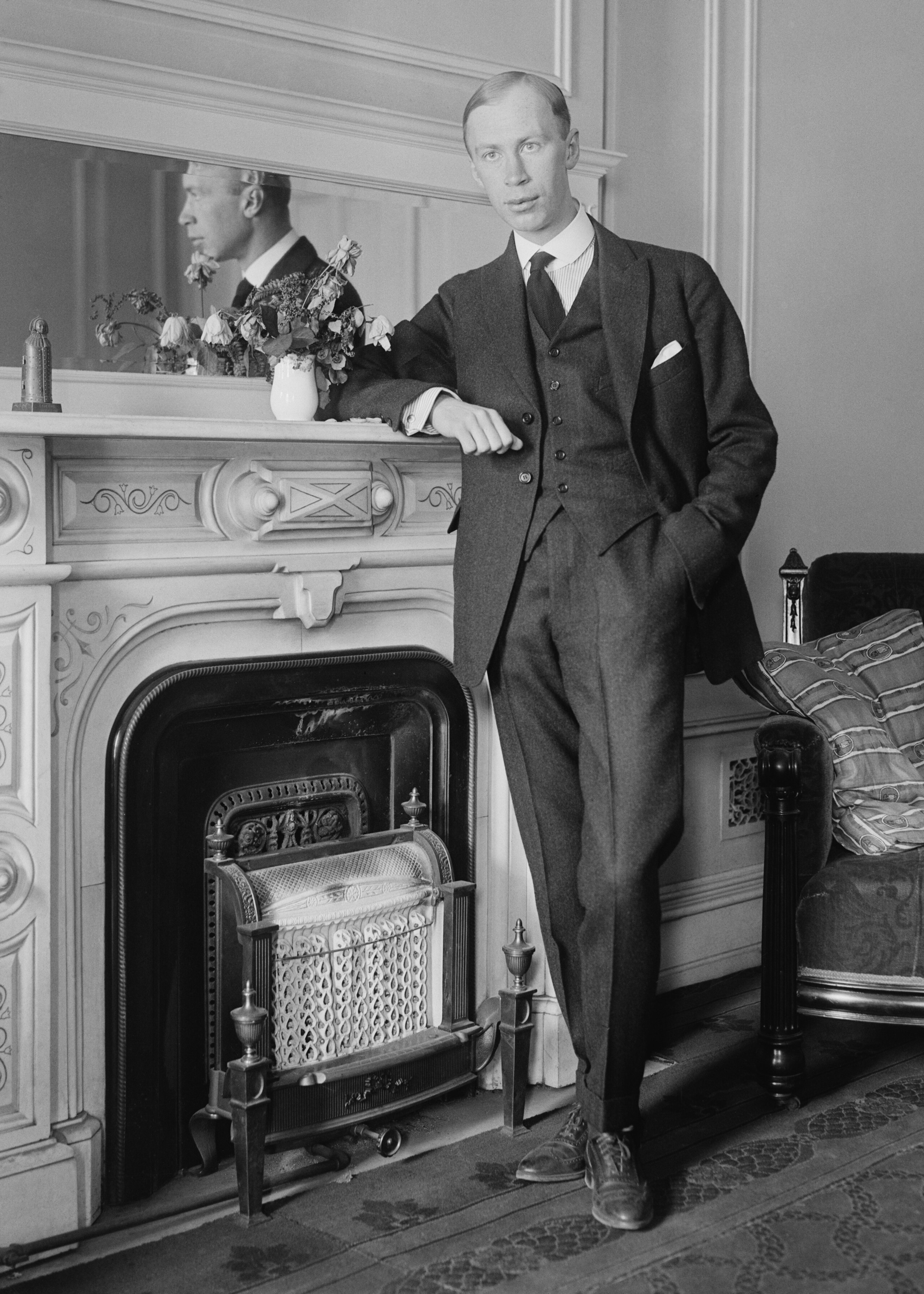
- The composer c. 1918
- Native title: Война и мир, Voyna i mir
- Librettist: Prokofiev; Mira Mendelson
- Language: Russian
- Based on: War and Peace by Leo Tolstoy
- Premiere: 12 June 1946; Maly Theatre, Leningrad

War and Peace (Op. 91) (Russian: Война и мир, Voyna i mir) is a 1946 230-minute opera in 13 scenes, plus an overture and an epigraph, by Sergei Prokofiev. Based on the 1869 novel War and Peace by Leo Tolstoy, its Russian libretto was prepared by the composer and Mira Mendelson. The first seven scenes are devoted to peace, the latter six, after the epigraph, to war.

Although Tolstoy's work is classified as a novel, the 1812 invasion of Russia by the French was a historical event, and some real-life people appear as characters in both the novel and the opera, e.g. Prince Mikhail Kutuzov and Napoleon Bonaparte.

== Composition history ==
Mendelson and Prokofiev's original scheme for the libretto of the opera envisaged 11 scenes, and Prokofiev began composing the music in the summer of 1941, spurred on by the German invasion of the Soviet Union which began on June 22, 1941. The description "lyric-dramatic scenes" in the libretto accurately suggests both a homage to Tchaikovsky's Eugene Onegin and an emphasis on individuals and their emotions rather than on the bigger picture of a country at war.

A piano score was completed by the summer of 1942 (two scenes having been changed from the original version), and it was submitted to the Soviet Union's Committee on the Arts. The Committee demanded that the Part 2 (War) scenes needed a more patriotic and heroic emphasis. Prokofiev, who had wanted to see his masterpiece staged as quickly as possible, added marches, choruses, and other materials to Part 2 to satisfy the committee. In addition, he composed the choral Epigraph, which emphasises the Russian people's defiance in the face of the enemy.

== Performance history ==
Plans were drawn up for a 1943 première at the Bolshoi Theatre, Moscow, to be directed by Sergei Eisenstein and conducted by Samuil Samosud. Nothing came of this project, although a private performance of eight scenes with piano accompaniment took place at the Moscow Actors’ Centre on October 16, 1944, and a public concert performance of nine scenes, conducted by Samosud, was given in the Great Hall of the Moscow Conservatory on June 7, 1945.

The first staged performance was of a newly extended seven-scene version of Part 1 (what is now Scene 2 having been added at Samosud's suggestion), together with Scene 8, the first scene of Part 2. This took place on June 12, 1946, at the Maly Theatre (before the Revolution – Mikhailovsky Theatre) in Leningrad, again conducted by Samosud. Part 2, also with an additional scene (Scene 10), was to be performed there in July 1947, but after the dress rehearsal no public performances were given, “for reasons beyond the control of the theatre and the composer”.

Following the Zhdanov decree of February 1948, Prokofiev started work on a shortened single-evening version of the opera, at the same time making various revisions to his original scheme, although the thirteen-scene framework remained. This version was first performed on 26 May 1953, at the Teatro Comunale, Florence, conducted by Artur Rodziński, two months after the composer's death. Scenes 2 and 9 were, however, omitted. The Russian première of this version was given at the Maly Theatre, Leningrad, on April 1, 1955, conducted by Eduard Grikurov, in this case with the omission of Scenes 7 and 11. All thirteen scenes (but with cuts) were eventually first performed together on November 8, 1957, at the Stanislavski-Nemirovich-Danchenko Theatre in Moscow, under the baton of Samosud's assistant Alexander Shaverdov. On December 15, 1959, the 13 scenes and Epigraph were finally staged uncut (conducted by Alexander Melik-Pashayev) at the Bolshoi Theatre, Moscow, although this was preceded in the United States by an NBC telecast conducted by Peter Herman Adler on January 13, 1957.

The first British performance was a Leeds Festival concert performance of nine scenes at Leeds Town Hall on April 19, 1967 conducted by Edward Downes. The first British staged performance was by Sadlers’ Wells Opera on October 11, 1972 in English in a production by Colin Graham conducted by David Lloyd-Jones, and the first American staging by the Opera Company of Boston on May 8, 1974. In other countries, the thirteen-scene version of the opera was first performed in Germany (Bonn) and Bulgaria (Sofia) in 1957, Serbia (Belgrade) in 1958, Croatia (Zagreb) in 1961, the Czech Republic (Liberec) in 1962, France (Théâtre des Champs-Élysées, Paris, in concert) and Canada (Montreal) in 1967, Austria (Vienna State Opera, conducted by Mstislav Rostropovich) in 1971, Australia (the opening performance at the Sydney Opera House) and Argentina (Teatro Colón, Buenos Aires) in 1973, Spain (Liceu, Barcelona) in 1977 and the Netherlands (Amsterdam, conducted by Edo de Waart) in 1991. The Canadian Opera Company performed the opera as part of its 2008–09 season.

=== Original version ===
In 2010 Prokofiev's original version of the opera, edited by Rita McAllister, was premiered in Glasgow, in a collaboration between Scottish Opera and the Royal Conservatoire of Scotland (formerly RSAMD). This briefer version represents Prokofiev's thoughts in 1941, before the various additions and amendments he assembled over the years. It runs some 90 minutes shorter than the later version.

== Roles ==
Role	Voice type	Premiere cast Moscow 1945	Premiere cast Leningrad 1946	Premiere cast Florence 1953	Premiere cast Leningrad 1955	Premiere cast NBC TV 1957	Premiere cast Moscow 1957	Premiere cast Moscow 1959
Version
		9 scenes Concert performance	8 scenes Stage première	11 scenes	11 scenes	13 scenes	13 scenes (cut)	13 scenes
Natalya (Natasha) Rostova	soprano	M. Nadion	Tatiana Lavrova	Rosanna Carteri	Tatiana Lavrova	Helena Scott	Valentina Kayevchenko	Galina Vishnevskaya
Count Pyotr (Pierre) Bezukhov	tenor	F. Fedotov	Oles Chishko	Franco Corelli	Glebov	David Lloyd		Vladimir Petrov
Prince Andrei Bolkonsky	baritone	Andrei Ivanov	Sergei Shaposhnikov	Ettore Bastianini	Sergei Shaposhnikov	Morley Meredith	Shchabinsky	Yevgeny Kibkalo
Field-Marshal Prince Mikhail Kutuzov	bass	Alexander Pirogov	Butyagin	Italo Tajo	Butyagin	Kenneth Smith	Alexander Pirogov	Alexei Krivchenya
Napoleon Bonaparte	baritone				Modestov	Leon Lishner		Pavel Lisitsian
Count Ilya Rostov, Natasha's father	bass			Italo Tajo		Chester Watson		
Hélène Bezukhova, Pierre's wife	contralto	A. Vassilieva		Cesy Broggini	Baskova	Gloria Lane		Irina Arkhipova
Prince Anatole Kuragin, her brother	tenor	F. Oganian	Androukovich	Mirto Picchi	Androukovich	Davis Cunningham		Aleksei Maslennikov

=== Other roles ===
Over seventy characters are listed in the libretto, and many singers usually play multiple roles.

Other important characters are:

- Sonya, Natasha's cousin (mezzo-soprano)
- Maria Dmitrievna Akhrosimova (contralto)
- Dolokhov (baritone)
- Colonel Vasska Denisov (bass)
- Platon Karataev (tenor)
- Prince Nikolai Bolkonsky, Andrei's father (bass-baritone)

Other named characters are:

- Madame Peronskaya (soprano)
- Tsar Alexander I (silent role)
- Princess Marya Bolkonskaya, Andrei's sister (mezzo-soprano)
- Balaga, a coachman (bass)
- Joseph, a servant (silent role)
- Matriosha, a gipsy (mezzo-soprano)
- Dunyasha, Natasha's maid (soprano)
- Gavrila, Mme Akhrosimova's butler (bass)
- Metivier, a French doctor (baritone)
- Tikhon Scherbatsky, a partisan (baritone)
- Vasilisa (soprano)
- Fyodor, a partisan (tenor)
- Matveyev, a Muscovite (baritone)
- Trishka (contralto)
- Marshal Berthier (baritone)
- Marquis de Caulaincourt (silent role)
- General Belliard (baritone)
- Monsieur de Beausset (tenor)
- General Count von Bennigsen (bass)
- Prince Mikhail Barclay de Tolly (tenor)
- General Aleksey Yermolov (baritone)
- General Pyotr Konovnitsyn (tenor)
- General Nikolay Raevsky (baritone)
- Malasha, a young girl (silent role)
- Captain Ramballe (bass)
- Lieutenant Bonnet (tenor)
- Ivanov, a Muscovite (tenor)
- Jacquot (bass)
- Gérard (tenor)
- Mavra Kusminitchna (contralto)
- Marshal Davout (bass)

Unnamed characters are:
The Host at the ball and his Major-Domo (tenors), Prince Nikolai Bolkonsky's servants – his Major-Domo and an old servant (baritones) and a housemaid (soprano), a French Abbé (tenor), two Prussian Generals (speaking roles), two staff-officers (tenor and bass), Prince Andrei's Orderly (tenor), Adjutants to General Compans and Prince Eugène (tenors) and to Marshal Murat (treble), Aides-de-camp to Napoleon (bass) and Kutuzov (tenor), an off-stage Orderly (tenor), a young workman (tenor), a shopkeeper (soprano), a French Officer (baritone), three Madmen (tenor, baritone, silent role), two French Actresses (soprano), an escort (silent role).

== Synopsis ==
=== Part 1 (Peace) ===
The Overture or the Epigraph usually precedes the action

Scene 1: After dark, in the garden of Count Rostov's country estate, May, 1806

Andrei, who is a guest there, is depressed by the loss of his wife. Natasha, who also cannot sleep, looks out of her window and tells Sonya how beautiful the garden looks in the moonlight, and Andrei recovers his spirits.

Scene 2: New Year's Eve, 1810

At a ball in St Petersburg attended by the Tsar, Pierre encourages Andrei, who is attracted to Natasha, to ask her to dance. Anatole, also attracted to her, asks Hélène to arrange an introduction.

Scene 3: Town house of Prince Nikolai, February 1812

Count Rostov and Natasha visit Prince Nikolai's home. He is the father of Andrei, to whom she is engaged. Andrei has been abroad for a year. Princess Marya indicates that her father will not see them, and Count Rostov departs. However, the Prince, dressed eccentrically and behaving boorishly, does appear, and Natasha realises that he does not approve of the marriage.

Scene 4: Pierre's Moscow house, May 1812

Hélène tells Natasha that Anatole is attracted to her, and, after some hesitation, Natasha hears his declaration of love and agrees to meet him.

Scene 5: Dolokhov's apartment, 12 June 1812

Dolokhov has made the arrangements for his friend Anatole's elopement with Natasha. The coach-driver Balaga, Dolokhov and Anatole drink to the escapade and to the latter's mistress Matriosha.

Scene 6: Later that night

Natasha discovers that Sonya has given away her secret to Madame Akhrosimova, with whom they are staying. Anatole and Dolokhov are sent away by Gavrila, and Akhrosimova reduces Natasha to tears. Pierre arrives, reveals that Anatole is married, and agrees to ask Andrei to forgive Natasha. He shyly admits that he himself would want to marry her if he were free. Natasha takes poison off-stage and rushes back on stage in great agitation to confess this fact to Sonya.

Scene 7: Later still

Hélène is entertaining Anatole, Metivier and an Abbé. Pierre, returning home, upbraids Anatole and demands that he leave Moscow immediately. He agrees, and Pierre is left alone to bemoan his own circumstances. Denisov arrives with the news that Napoleon and his army are crossing into Russia. War is inevitable.

=== Part 2 (War) ===
The Epigraph is usually performed here if it was not used at the start of Part 1.

Scene 8: Near Borodino, 25 August 1812

Amid preparations for the defence of Moscow, Andrei and Denisov discuss utilising partisans to make life difficult for Napoleon's army. Pierre, wanting to observe the scene, arrives, and he and Andrei embrace, perhaps for the last time. Field-Marshal Kutuzov offers Andrei a position on his staff, but Andrei prefers to go into battle with his own regiment. The battle starts.

Scene 9: Later that day

Napoleon ponders his position, first refusing to commit more men, then agreeing. An unexploded cannonball lands at his feet and he kicks it away.

Scene 10: Two days later

Kutuzov and his generals are holding a Council of War at Fili, near Smolensk. The army will be at risk if Moscow is to be defended to the last – but if the army retreats, Moscow will be at the mercy of the French. Kutuzov decides that only by retreating, and potentially sacrificing Moscow, will there be any hope of victory.

Scene 11: Moscow is burning

The city is on fire because its citizens try to avoid a surrender. Pierre is caught up among some Muscovites, including the veteran Platon Karataev, who are accused by the French of fire-raising. As the asylum and theatre burn, lunatics and actresses flee – but Napoleon has to admit that the courage of the people has frustrated his plans.

Scene 12: In a peasant's hut at Mitishchi

The wounded Prince Andrei, delirious, has been evacuated with the Rostovs from Moscow. Natasha, who had been unaware that he was among her fellow evacuees, visits him. She tries to apologise for her conduct, but he again declares his love for her, and they sing of their happiness as Natasha reassures him that he will live. He falls asleep, and his heartbeat (conveyed by an offstage chorus) stops for ever.

Scene 13: November, 1812

On the road to Smolensk, the retreating French are escorting a group of prisoners through a snow-storm. Karataev cannot keep up and is shot, but Pierre and the others are rescued by the partisans. Denisov tells Pierre that Andrei is dead but that Natasha is alive and well. Kutuzov and his men rejoice in their victory, and celebrate the indomitable will of the Russian people.

== Music ==
Broadly speaking, the music for Part 1 is lyrical and that for Part 2 is dramatic. There are a number of arias, though these are rarely free-standing and are usually preceded and/or followed by arioso or short conversational passages. Dance music is prominent in Part 1, military music and choruses in Part 2. A number of themes, associated especially with Natasha, Andrei and Pierre, recur throughout the opera. Prokofiev borrowed Natasha's and Andrei's principal themes from incidental music that he had written for a dramatisation of Pushkin's Eugene Onegin: Natasha's theme had been associated with Lensky, and Andrei's with Tatyana. Kutuzov's aria in Scene 10 (also sung by the chorus at the end of the opera) re-used music that Prokofiev had written for Eisenstein's film Ivan the Terrible.

== Instrumentation ==
Chorus
Orchestra

Piccolo
2 Flutes
2 Oboes
Cor Anglais
2 Clarinets

Bass Clarinet
2 Bassoons
Contrabassoon
4 Horns
3 Trumpets

3 Trombones
Tuba
Timpani
Harp

Strings (1st and 2nd Violins, Violas, Cellos, Double basses)
Percussion (Triangle, Wooden Drum, Tambourine, Snare Drum, Bass Drum, Cymbals, Tam-tam, Glockenspiel, Xylophone)

== Recordings ==
Year	Cast: Natasha, Pierre, Andrei Bolkonsky, Prince Mikhail Kutuzov	Conductor, Opera House and Orchestra	Label
1953	Rosanna Carteri, Franco Corelli, Ettore Bastianini, Italo Tajo	Artur Rodziński, Maggio Musicale Fiorentino Orchestra and Chorus (Recording of a performance at the Maggio Musicale Fiorentino, May, sung in Italian)	Audio CD: Andromeda/Melodram; Cat: ANDRCD 5022
1958	Radmila Vasovic-Bakocevic, Alexander Marinkovich, Dushan Popovich, Djordje Djurdejevic	Werner Janssen, Belgrade National Opera Orchestra, Vienna State Opera Orchestra and Vienna Chamber Choir	Audio CD: Naxos Classical Archive; Cat: 9.81197-98 (Original: MGM Records)
1961	Galina Vishnevskaya, Vladimir Petrov, Yevgeny Kibkalo, Alexei Krivchenya	Alexander Melik-Pashayev, Bolshoi Theatre Orchestra and Chorus	Audio CD: BMG-Melodiya; Cat: 74321 29 350–2
1982	Galina Kalinina, Evgeni Raikov, Yuri Mazurok, Alexander Vedernikov	Mark Ermler, Bolshoi Theatre Orchestra and Chorus	Audio CD: Melodiya; Cat: MEL CD 10 01444
1986	Galina Vishnevskaya, Wieslaw Ochman, Lajos Miller, Nicola Ghiuselev	Mstislav Rostropovich, ORTF National Orchestra and Chorus	Audio CD: Erato; Cat: 2292–45331–2
1986	Roumyana Bareva, Petko Marinov, Lyubomir Videnov, Stefan Elenkov	Rouslan Raichev, Sofia National Opera	Audio CD: Fidelio; Cat: 8801/3 (Original: Balkanton)
1991	Yelena Prokina, Gegam Grigorian, Alexandr Gergavov, Nikolay Okhotnikov	Valery Gergiev, Kirov Theatre Orchestra and Chorus	Audio CD: Philips; Cat: 434 097–2; DVD: Kultur, Cat: D 2903; Arthaus Musik, Cat: 100 370
1999	Ekaterina Morozova, Justin Lavender, Oleg Balachov, Roderick Williams	Richard Hickox, Spoleto Festival Orchestra and State Symphony Capella of Russia (Recorded in the Teatro Nuovo, Spoleto, 4,6,8–10 July)	Audio CD: Chandos Records; Cat: CHAN 9855
2000	Olga Guryakova, Robert Brubaker, Nathan Gunn, Anatoli Kotcherga	Gary Bertini, Paris Opera Orchestra and Chorus (Video recording of a performance in the Opéra Bastille, Paris), a lot of minor and major cuts, incomplete.	DVD: TDK; Cat: DV-OPWP (Europe); DVUS-OPWP (US)

== See also ==
- Waltz Suite (Prokofiev)
