= Sakhalin Island (film) =

- Russian: Остров Сахалин
- Directed by: Eldar Ryazanov; Vasiliy Katanyan
- Written by: I. Osipov; Mark Troyanovskiy
- Starring: Leonid Khmara
- Cinematography: Leonid Pankin; A. Kochetkov; N. Shmakov; Ilya Gutman; G. Serov
- Music by: Revol Bunin; S. Razoryovov
- Release date: 1954
- Running time: 45 minute
- Country: Soviet Union

Sakhalin Island (Russian: Остров Сахалин) is a 1954 Soviet documentary film directed by Eldar Ryazanov and Vasiliy Katanyan.

The film tells the story and shows the nature and inhabitants of Sakhalin Island.

== Premise ==
The film, presented in the style of a cinematic essay, explores the history, nature, and people of Sakhalin Island. Beginning in Yuzhno-Sakhalinsk, the expedition moves through summer reindeer herding camps, geological survey teams, bird colonies, and seal rookeries.

Aerial footage captures pilots tracking schools of fish and directing trawlers to abundant herring shoals. On the floating crab-processing ship Alma-Ata, crabs are shown being boiled in seawater on deck before being transported to the factory for canning.

A pivotal sequence recounts the rescue of the ice-bound vessel Pozharsky. Supplies and explosives are airlifted to the stranded crew, and after locating the ship, relief operations commence. The crew clears a path through the ice using explosives, enabling the vessel to reach open water.

== Cast ==
- Leonid Khmara as narrator (voice)
