= Viktor Eisymont =

Soviet film director (1904–1964)

- Born: Viktor Vladislavovich Eisymont; 20 December 1904; Hrodna, Russian Empire (now Belarus)
- Died: 31 January 1964 (aged 59); Moscow, Soviet Union (now Russia)
- Occupation: Film director
- Years active: 1938–1964
- Awards: Stalin Prize second degree (1942, 1947, 1951)

Viktor Vladislavovich Eisymont (Russian: Виктор Владиславович Эйсымонт, 20 December 1904 – 31 January 1964) was a Soviet film director.

== Filmography ==
- Friends (Russian: Друзья) (1938); co-directed with Lev Arnshtam
- The Fourth Periscope (Четвертый перископ) (1939)
- The Girl from Leningrad (Фронтовые подруги) (1941) – Stalin Prize second degree (1942)
- Once There Was a Girl (Жила-была девочка) (1944)
- Cruiser 'Varyag' (Крейсер «Варяг») (1946) – Stalin Prize second degree (1947)
- Alexander Popov (Александр Попов) (1949); co-directed with Gerbert Rappaport – Stalin Prize second degree (1951)
- Lights on the River (Огни на реке) (1953)
- Two Friends (Два друга) (1954)
- Lights on the River (Огни на реке) (1954)
- The Drummer's Fate (Судьба барабанщика) (1955)
- Good Luck! (В добрый час!) (1956)
- Buddy (Дружок) (1958)
- The Adventures of Tolya Klyukvin (Приключения Толи Клюквина) (1964)
- The End of Old Beryozovka (Конец старой Берёзовки) (1960)
- Unusual Town (Необыкновенный город) (1962)
