= Nikolai Golovanov =

Russian composer and conductor (1891–1953)

- Николай Голованов
- Born: 21 January 1891; Moscow, Russian Empire
- Died: 28 August 1953 (aged 62); Nikolina Gora, Russian SFSR, Soviet Union
- Occupations: Conductor; composer

Nikolai Semyonovich Golovanov (Note: Russian: Николай Семёнович Голованов, romanized: Nikolay Semyonovich Golovanov) (January 21 1891 [O.S. January 9] – August 28, 1953) was a Soviet conductor and composer, who was married to the soprano Antonina Nezhdanova.

He conducted the premiere performances of a number of works, among them Nikolai Myaskovsky's Sixth Symphony in May 1924.

Golovanov held some of the highest musical positions in the USSR, including an extensive association with the Bolshoi Opera. In her autobiography, Galina Vishnevskaya terms him the theater's chief conductor, and tells of his dismissal from the Bolshoi and his death - which she attributed to the humiliation of the experience of losing this position. It has been reported that Golovanov's firing was the result of Stalin's displeasure at Golovanov's having tried to use a Jewish singer, Mark Reizen, in the title role of Tsar Boris Godunov in his recording of Mussorgsky's opera. Golovanov actually did record the opera with Reizen as Boris, but later remade Reizen's part with another Boris, Alexander Pirogov.

Golovanov's recorded output was substantial and quite individual in interpretive approach. In his discography we find all but one of the Liszt tone poems, the complete Scriabin symphonies and Piano Concerto, Tchaikovsky's First and Sixth symphonies, as well as shorter works, Beethoven's First Symphony, Violin Concerto and Triple Concerto, Rimsky-Korsakov's Scheherazade and his operas Sadko and Christmas Eve, Mussorgsky's Boris Godunov and Pictures at an Exhibition, Rachmaninoff's Second and Third symphonies, the opera Aleko and other compositions, Glazunov's Fifth, Sixth and Seventh symphonies, and scores by Grieg, Mozart and others.

In addition to audio recordings by Golovanov, there is a film of Golovanov conducting the USSR State Symphony Orchestra in a performance of Tchaikovsky's 1812 Overture. As was the practice in Soviet times, the Tsarist anthem was replaced with the chorus "Glory, Glory to you, holy Russia!" from Mikhail Glinka's A Life for the Tsar. The film does not feature synchronous sound, but has short segments of Golovanov conducting.

Golovanov was also a composer; his works include the opera "Princess Yurata", a symphony and other orchestral works as well as choral music.

== Awards and honours ==
- Honoured Worker of the Arts Industry of the RSFSR
- People's Artist of the RSFSR (1943)
- People's Artist of the USSR (1948)
- Four Stalin Prizes, 1st class (1946, 1949, 1950, 1951)
- Order of the Red Banner of Labour (2 June 1937)
- Order of Lenin (27 May 1951)
- Medal "For the Defence of Moscow" (1949)
- Medal "For Valiant Labour in the Great Patriotic War 1941–1945"
- Medal "In Commemoration of the 800th Anniversary of Moscow"

== Notes ==
| Preceded by Alexander Orlov | Music Directors, Tchaikovsky Symphony Orchestra of Moscow Radio; 1937–1953 | Succeeded by Aleksandr Gauk |
| Preceded by Ari Pazovsky | Music Directors, Bolshoi Theatre, Moscow; 1948–1953 | Succeeded by Alexander Melik-Pashayev |
