= Konstantin Vilboa =

Russian composer

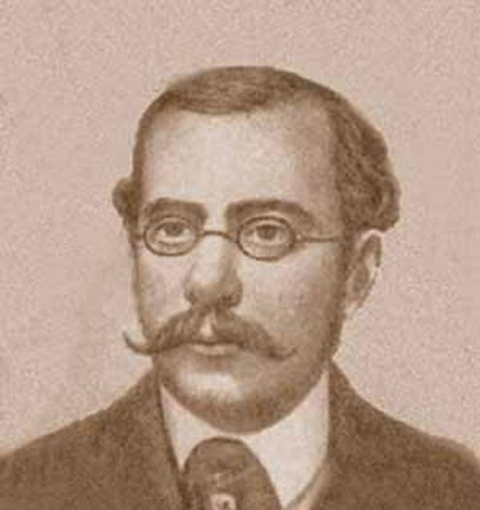

Konstantin Petrovich Villebois (Вильбоа Константин Петрович) (1817–1882) was a Russian composer.

The name Villebois (transliterated sometimes as Vilboa) is of French origin (Villebois). Vilboa was an autodidact who never received any musical education. He became a friend of Glinka around 1850.

Vilboa wrote nearly 200 popular songs such as the duet "The seafarers" ("unfriendly is our sea.." - "Нелюдимо наше море..") recorded by Maxim Mikhailov. These songs remained popular, for instance being sung at home by Shostakovich's engineer father. Vilboa's song collection 100 Russian National Songs (Сто русских народных песен Saint Petersburg 1860) was an anthology of melodies collected by playwright Alexander Ostrovsky on a River Volga steamer in 1856. This collection was used by, among other composers, Rimsky-Korsakov in his By the gate a pine tree was swaying and other songs.

Vilboa wrote three operas, but only one, Natasha, was staged in St. Petersburg, and left the repertoire after a few weeks.
