= Vera Stroyeva =

Soviet film director (1903–1991)

- Born: Vera Pavlovna Richter; 21 September 1903; Kiev, Kiev Governorate, Russian Empire
- Died: 26 August 1991 (aged 87); Moscow, Russian SFSR, USSR
- Occupations: Film director, screenwriter
- Years active: 1927–1983

Vera Pavlovna Stroyeva (Russian: Ве́ра Па́вловна Стро́ева, (née Richter); 21 September 1903 – 26 August 1991) was a Soviet film director and screenwriter. Between 1926 and 1983, she directed fifteen films and wrote ten screenplays. Her film adaptation of Modest Mussorgsky's opera Boris Godunov was nominated for a Golden Lion at the 16th Venice International Film Festival and screened out of competition at the 1987 Cannes Film Festival. Many of her films are musicals or adaptations of operas and feature heavy influence from socialist realism.

Stroyeva was awarded the Order of Friendship of Peoples, Order of the Badge of Honor, Honored Worker of the Arts of the Kazakh SSR, and People's Artist of the RSFSR.

She died in Moscow on 26 August 1991.

== Filmography ==
Film	Year	Director	Writer
Buket fialok	1983	Yes	No
Serdtse Rossii	1971	Yes	Yes
My, russkiy narod	1966	Yes	Yes
Khovanshchina	1959	Yes	Yes
Polyushko, pole	1957	Yes	No
Variety Stars	1954	Yes	No
Boris Godunov	1954	Yes	Yes
The Grand Concert	1951	Yes	No
Maryte	1947	Yes	No
Boyevoy kinosbornik 12 (segment "Syn boytsa/Son of a Fighter")	1942	Yes	No
V poiskakh radosti	1940	Yes	No
Generation of Victors	1936	Yes	Yes
Petersburg Nights	1934	Yes	Yes
Chelovek bez futlyara	1932	Yes	Yes
Pravo ottsov	1931	Yes	Yes
A Jew at War	1930	No	Yes
Dve zhenshchiny	1929	No	Yes
His Excellency	1928	No	Yes
Seeds of Freedom	1928	No	Yes
Gospoda Skotininy (scenario)	1927	No	Yes

== Awards ==
Award	Year	Won
People's Artist of the RSFR	1973	Won
Golden Lion	1955	Nominated
Mussolini Cup	1935	Nominated
