= Aleksandr Melik-Pashayev =

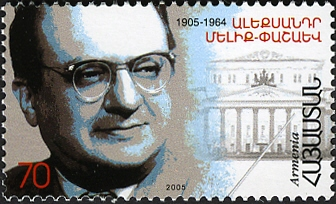
Aleksandr Melik-Pashayev

Aleksandr Shamilyevich Melik-Pashayev (Russian: Александр Шамильевич Мелик-Пашаев; Armenian: Ալեքսանդր Մելիք-Փաշայան, romanized: Alek’sandr Melik’-P’ashayan; 23 October 1905 – 18 June 1964) was a Soviet Armenian conductor, composer, pianist and pedagogue. He made numerous highly regarded recordings with Melodiya from the 1940s to the 1960s, including memorable versions of Boris Godunov, War and Peace and The Queen of Spades.

== Awards and honors ==
- Honored Art Worker of the RSFSR (1937)
- Three Orders of the Red Banner of Labour (1937, 1951, 1955)
- Order of the Badge of Honour (1939)
- Two Stalin Prizes, 1st class (1942, 1943)
- People's Artist of the RSFSR (1947)
- People's Artist of the USSR (1951)
- Medal "For Valiant Labour in the Great Patriotic War 1941–1945"
- Medal "In Commemoration of the 800th Anniversary of Moscow"

Preceded by Nikolai Golovanov	Music Directors, Bolshoi Theatre, Moscow; 1953–1963	Succeeded by Yevgeny Svetlanov
