= Bentsion Monastyrsky =

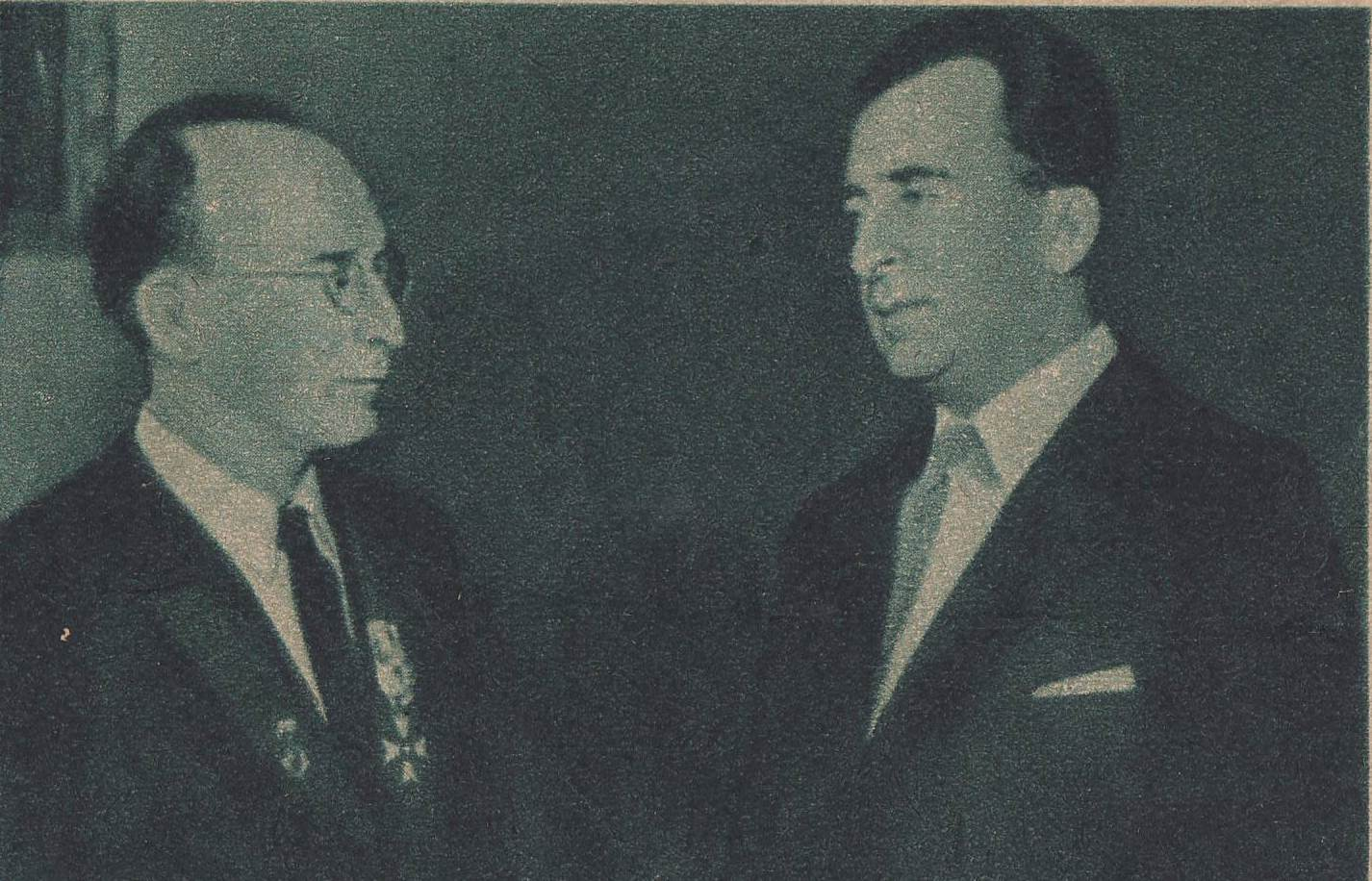
Polish ambassador awards Monastyrsky (left) with the Order of Polonia Restituta

Bentsion Monastyrsky (Russian: Бенцион Монастырский, 1903–1977) known in the Soviet Union as Boris Savelyevich Monastyrsky (Борис Савельевич Монастырский) was a Soviet cinematographer.

== Awards ==
1944: Order of the Red Star for the World War II film Rainbow
1947: Stalin State Prize of second degree for the film Cruiser 'Varyag'

- 1948: Officer's Cross of the Order of Polonia Restituta "for merits in the field of Polish-Soviet cooperation in the field of film art"

1969: Honored Artist of the RSFSR
