= Bolshoi Theatre =

Theatre in Moscow, Russia

- Большой театр
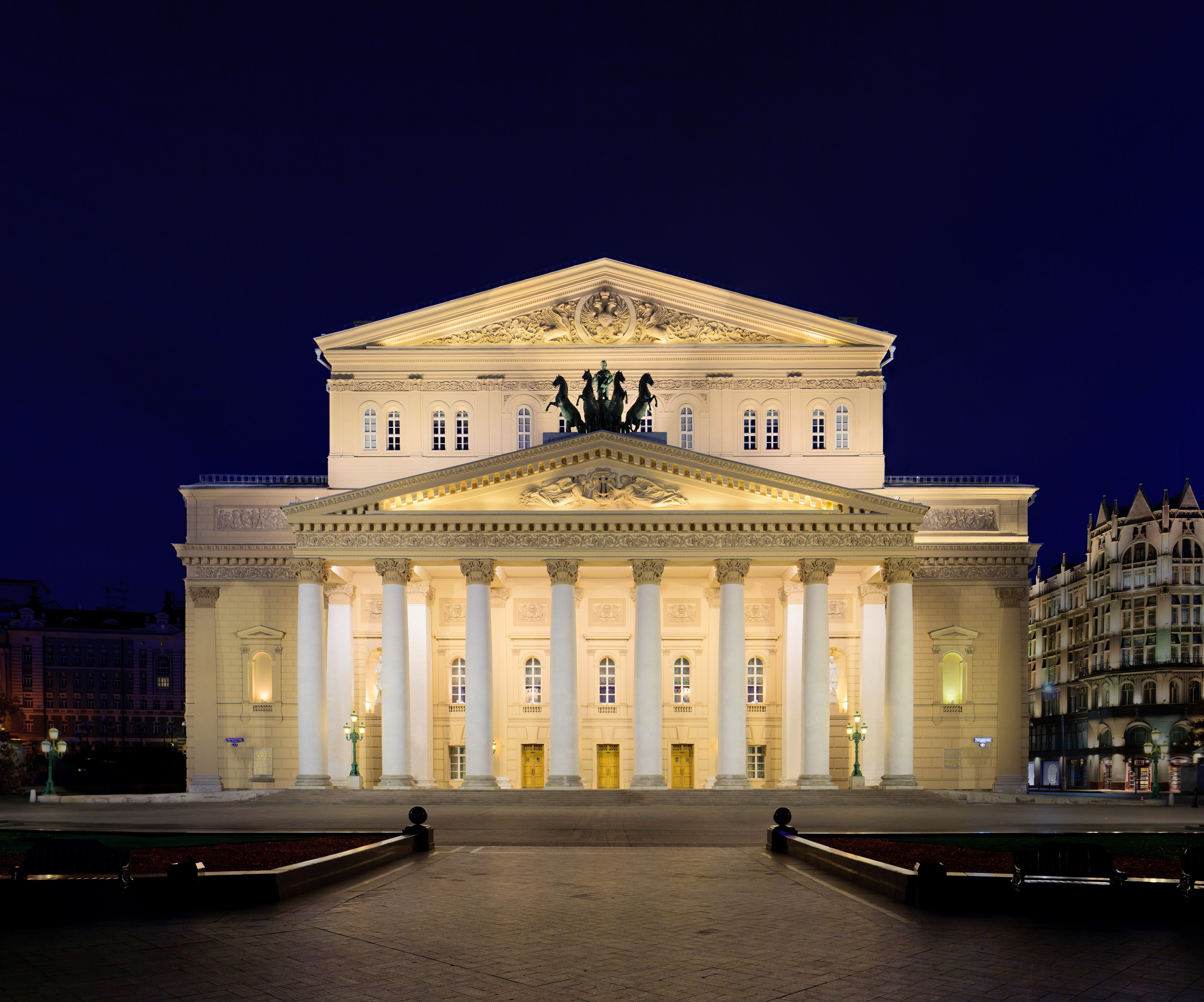
- Bolshoi Theatre

- Location within central Moscow
- Address: Teatralnaya Square 1, Tverskoy District, Moscow, Russia
- Coordinates: 55°45′37″N 37°37′07″E
- Capacity: 1,740
- Public transit: Teatralnaya or Okhotny Ryad (Moscow Metro)

Construction
- Opened: 1825
- Architect: Joseph Bové

Website
- www.bolshoi.ru

The Bolshoi Theatre (Russian: Большой театр, romanized: Bol'shoy teatr, IPA: [bɐlʲˈʂoj tʲɪˈat(ə)r], lit. 'Large Theater') is a historic opera house in Moscow, Russia, originally designed by architect Joseph Bové. Before the October Revolution it was a part of the Imperial Theatres of the Russian Empire along with Maly Theatre (Small Theatre) in Moscow and a few theatres in Saint Petersburg (Hermitage Theatre, Bolshoi (Kamenny) Theatre, later Mariinsky Theatre and others).

The Bolshoi Ballet and Bolshoi Opera are among the oldest and best known ballet and opera companies in the world. It is by far the world's biggest ballet company, with more than 200 dancers. The theatre is the parent company of The Bolshoi Ballet Academy, a leading school of ballet. It has a branch at the Bolshoi Theater School in Joinville, Brazil.

The main building of the theatre, rebuilt and renovated several times during its history, is a landmark of Moscow and Russia (its iconic neoclassical façade is depicted on the Russian 100-ruble banknote). On 28 October 2011, the Bolshoi re-opened after an extensive six-year renovation. The official cost of the renovation is 21 billion rubles ($688 million). However, other Russian authorities and other people connected to it claimed much more public money was spent. The renovation included restoring acoustics to the original quality (which had been lost during the Soviet era), as well as restoring the original imperial decor of the Bolshoi.

== History ==
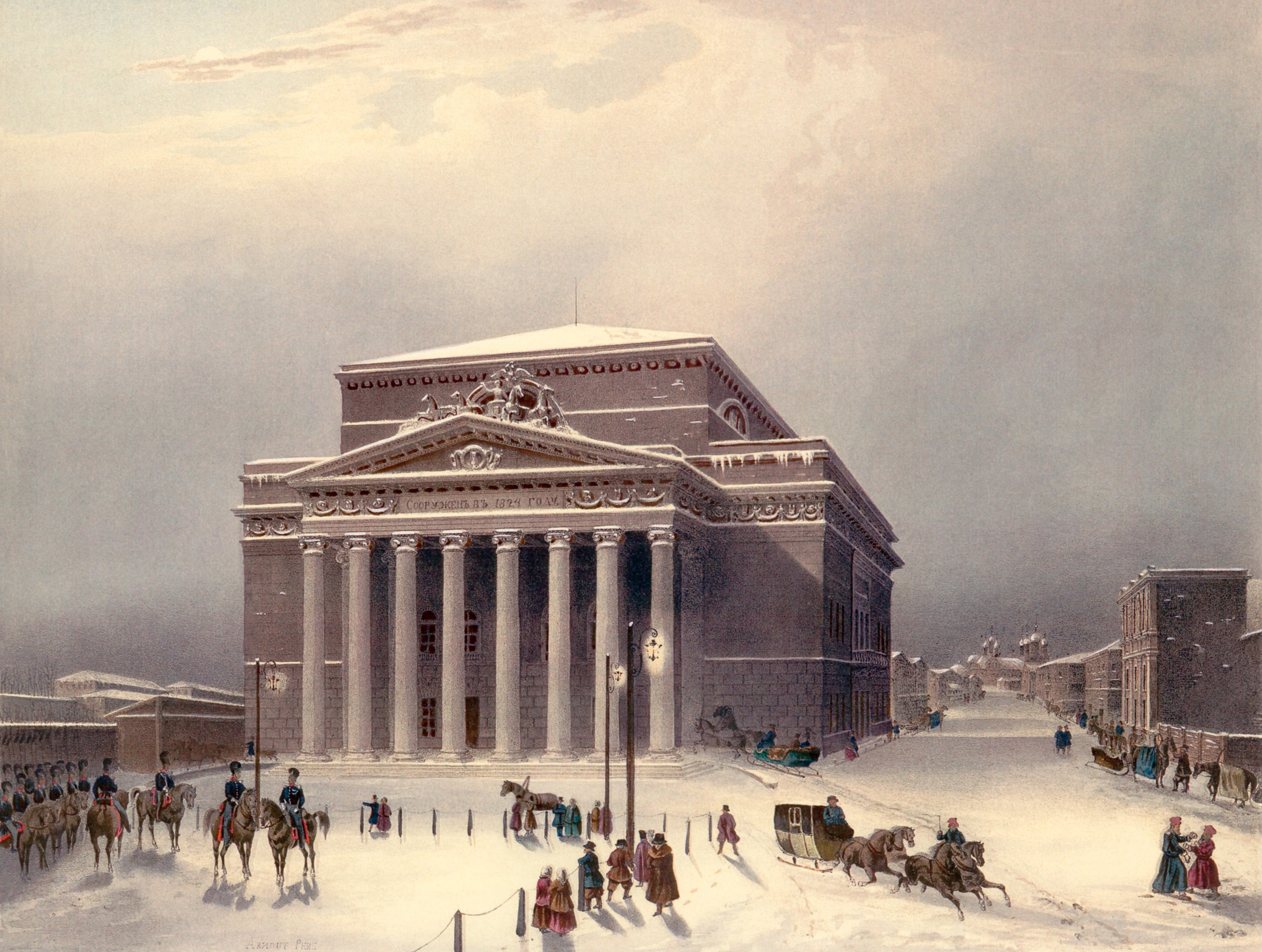
The old Bolshoi Theatre in the early 19th century

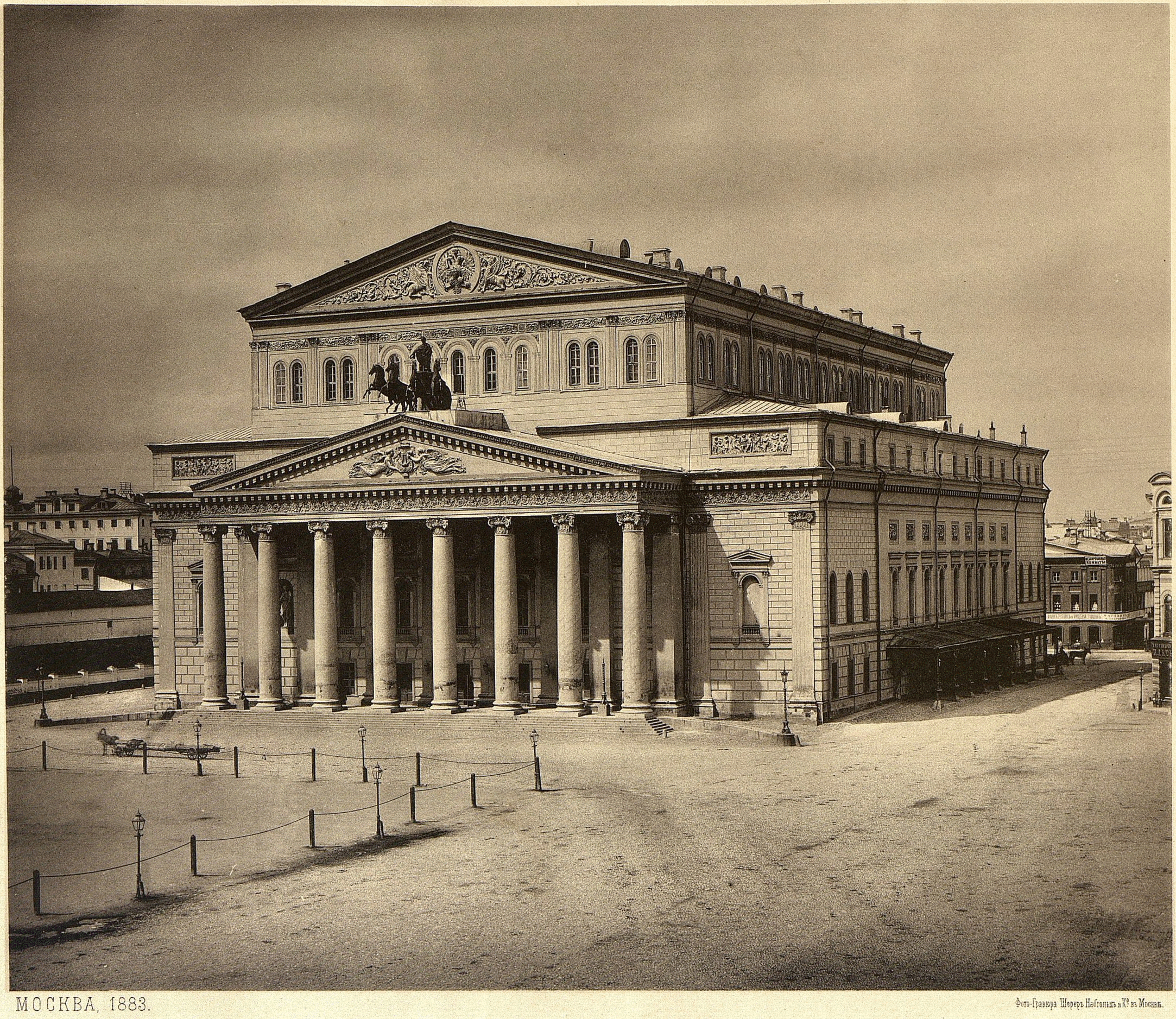
Bolshoi Theatre in 1883 after reconstruction by Alberto Cavos

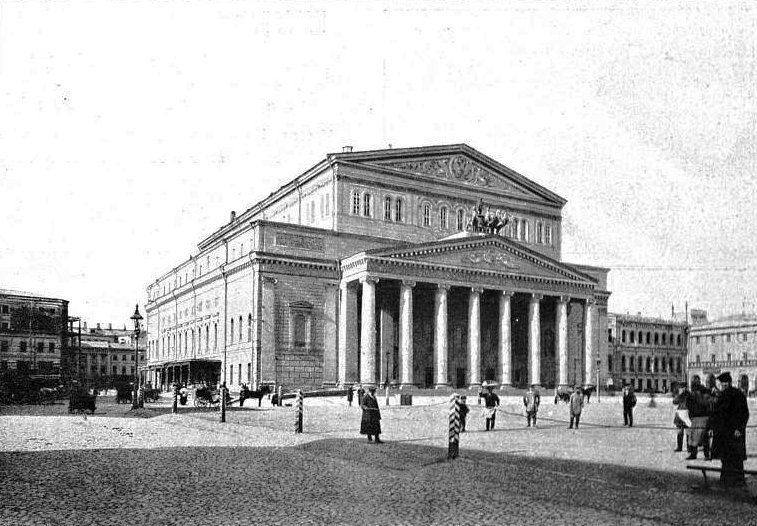
Bolshoi Theatre in 1905

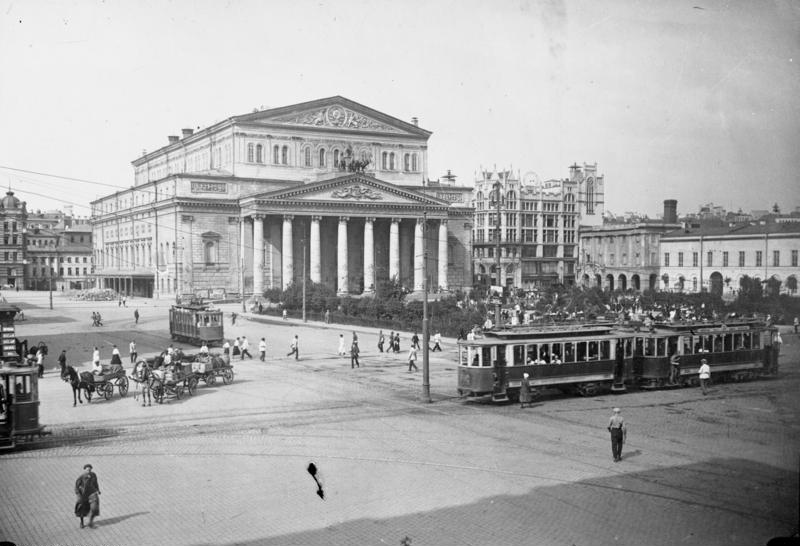
Bolshoi Theatre in 1932

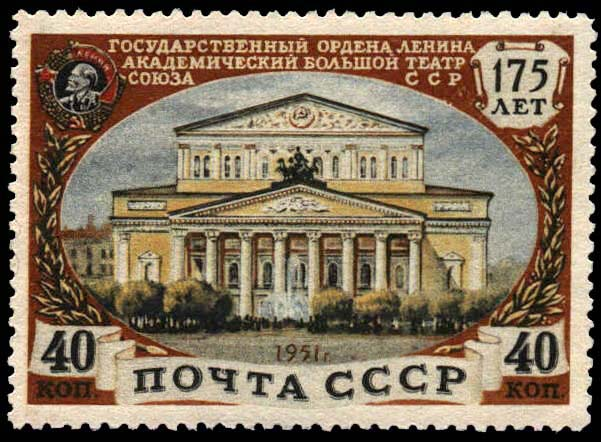
The Bolshoi on a 1951 stamp

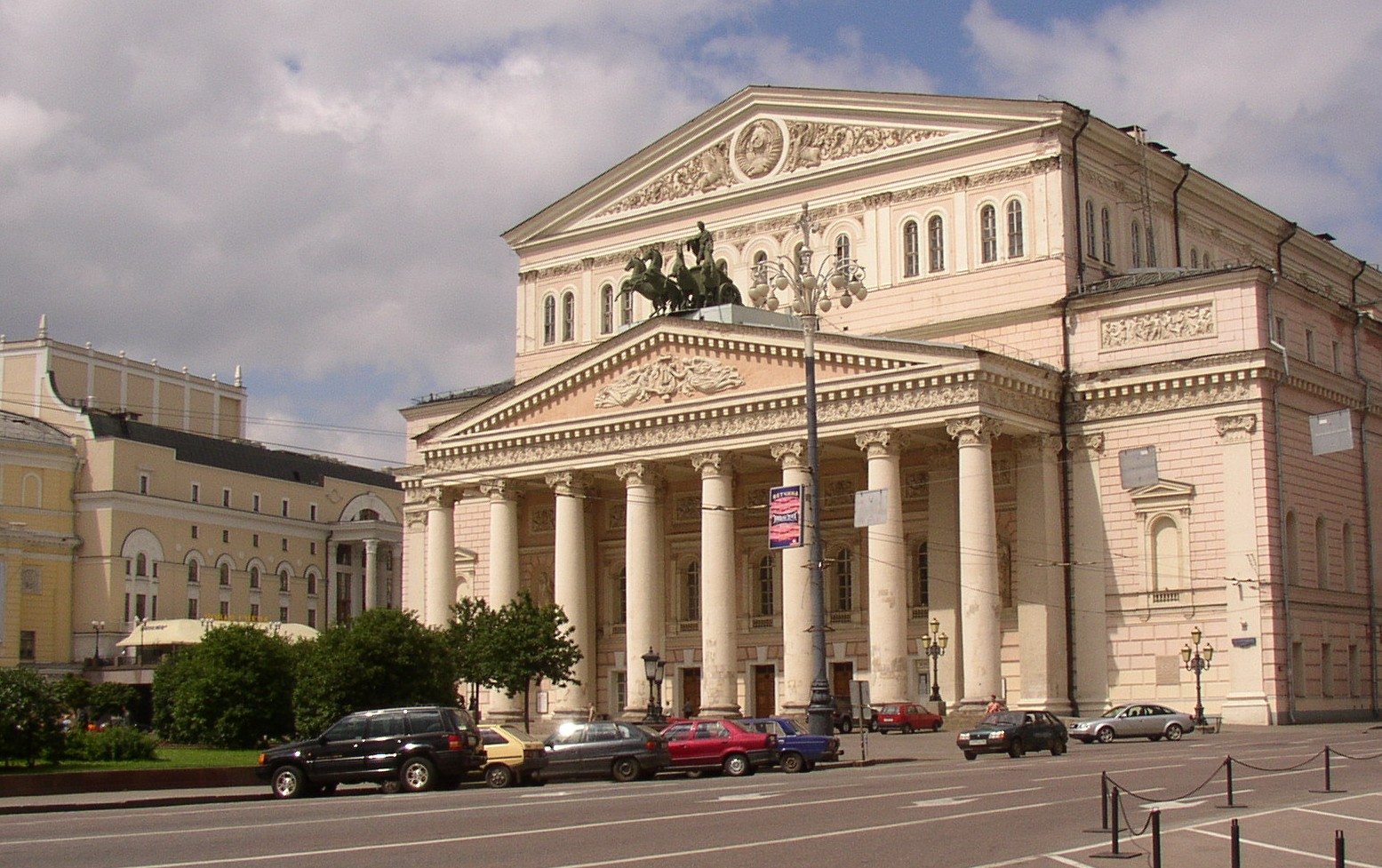
Bolshoi Theatre in 2006 before the renovation

=== 1776-1843: Founding and construction ===
The company was founded on 28 March [O.S. 17 March] 1776, when Catherine II granted Prince Peter Vasilyevich Urusov a licence to organise theatrical performances, balls and other forms of entertainment. Urusov set up the theatre in collaboration with English tightrope walker Michael Maddox. Initially, it held performances in a private home, but it acquired the Petrovka Theatre and on 30 December 1780, it began producing plays and operas, thus establishing what would become the Bolshoi Theatre. Fire destroyed the Petrovka Theatre on 8 October 1805, and the New Arbat Imperial Theatre replaced it on 13 April 1808. It also succumbed to fire during the French invasion of Moscow in 1812.

The first instance of the current theatre was built between 1821 and 1824, designed and supervised to completion by architect Joseph Bové based upon an initial competition-winning design created by Petersburg-based Russian architect Andrei Mikhailov that was deemed too costly to complete. The new building opened on 18 January 1825 as the Bolshoi Petrovsky Theatre with a performance of the catalan Fernando Sor's ballet, Cendrillon. Initially, it presented only Russian works, but foreign composers entered the repertoire around 1840.

=== 1843-1919: Renovations ===
In 1843, a large-scale reconstruction of the theatre took place using a design by A. Nikitin, but a fire in 1853 caused extensive damage and so a further reconstruction was carried out, by Alberto Cavos, son of the opera composer Catterino Cavos.

=== 1919-2002: Repairs ===
The first symphonic concert by the Bolshoi Orchestra took place at the Bolshoi Theatre on 4 May 1919, conducted by Serge Koussevitzky.

Just a few months later, on 7 December 1919, the house was renamed the State Academic Bolshoi Theatre. Only a few days later, however, on 12 December, there was an unsuccessful attempt to shut the institution entirely. Beethoven Hall opened on 18 February 1921. Ivan Rerberg directed further reconstruction of the theatre between 1921 and 1923. A bomb damaged the structure during World War II, but this was repaired.

=== 2002-2005: Stage installation ===
A new stage for the Bolshoi Theatre, called the New Stage, went into service on 29 November 2002, constructed to the left of the theatre's historic main stage. Together with auxiliary buildings (including a restored 17th-century building, two rehearsal halls, and artists' recreation rooms) it forms a single theatre complex, the Bolshoi Theatre of Russia. The new building is on a natural hill which it shared, until recently, blocks of old houses with communal apartments.

=== 2005-2011: Major rebuilding and renovation ===
From July 2005 to October 2011 the theatre was closed for restoration. The building, whose architecture combines three different styles, was damaged and a quick renovation seemed to be necessary.

Repairs were initially estimated at 15 billion rubles ($610 million) but engineers found that more than 75% of the structure was unstable, According to The Moscow Times, the true cost may have been double that, and Der Spiegel quotes a figure of $1.1 billion. The rebuilding and renovation was funded entirely by the federal government.

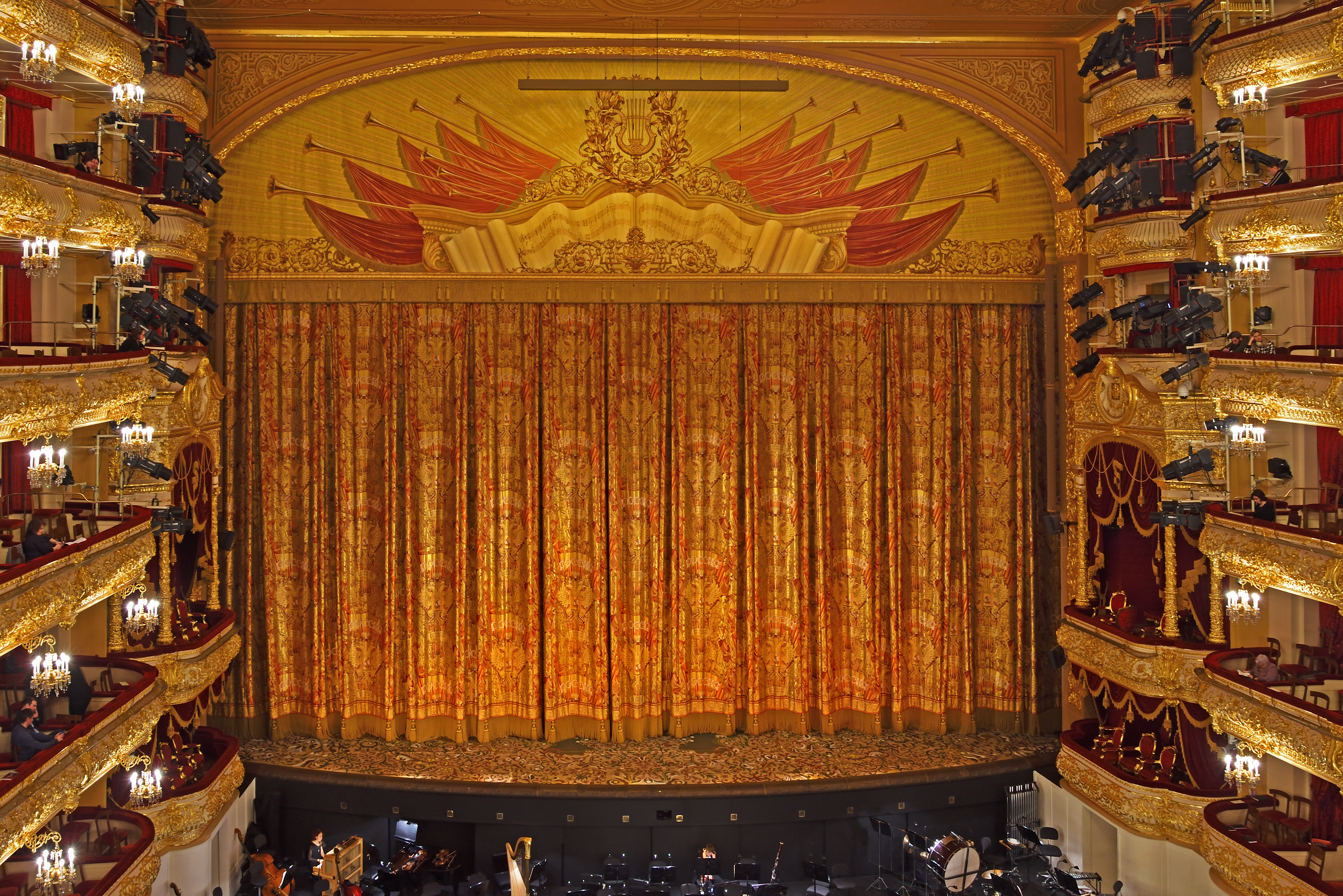
The curtain of the Bolshoi Theater

During the long period of reconstruction, the company continued to mount productions, with performances held on the New Stage and on the stage of the Great Kremlin Palace.

The renovation included restoring acoustics to the original quality (which had been lost during the Soviet era), as well as restoring the original imperial decor of the Bolshoi. After the renovation, the theater has a maximum capacity of 1,740 seats. Finally, on 28 October 2011, the Bolshoi Theatre re-opened with a concert featuring international artists and the ballet and opera companies. The first staged opera, Ruslan and Lyudmila, followed soon after.

== Ballet and opera ==
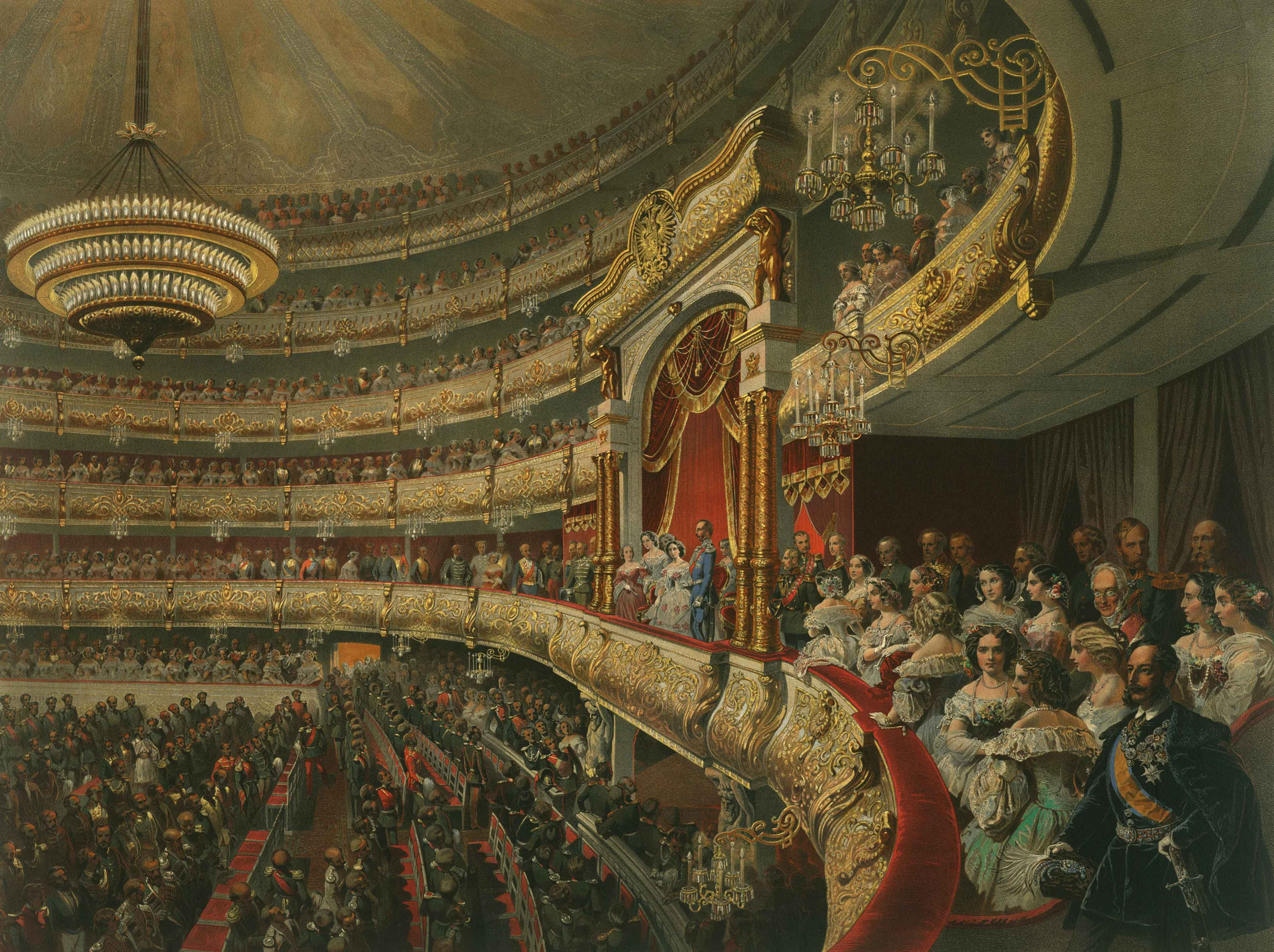
Performance in the Bolshoi Theatre (1856)

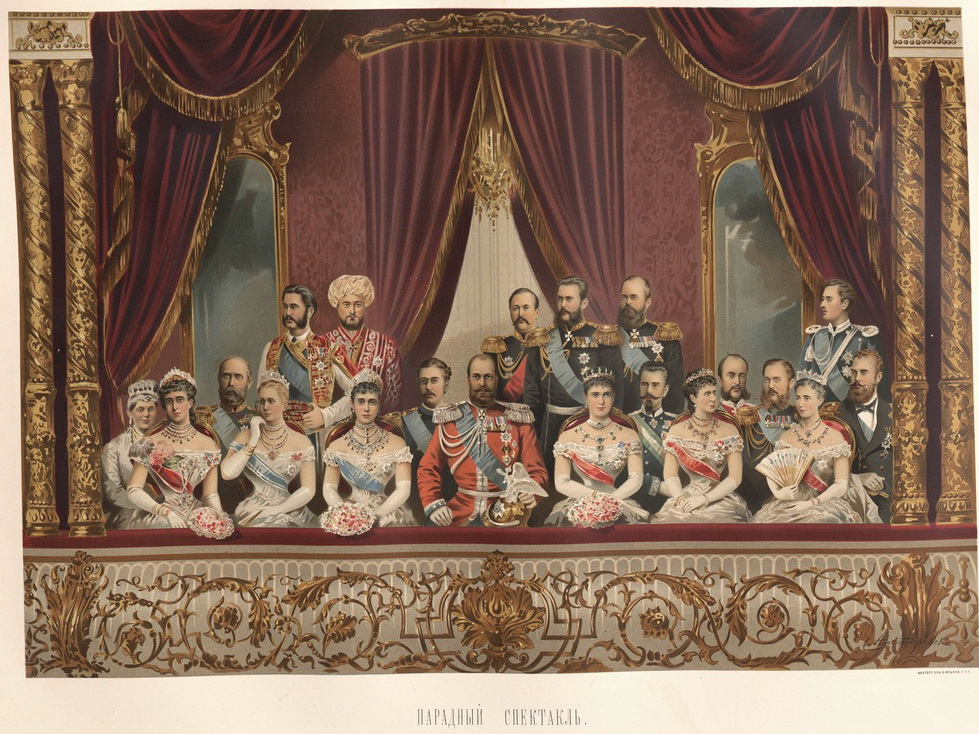
Alexander III of Russia and his family at the Bolshoi, 1883

The Bolshoi is a repertory theatre, meaning that it draws from a list of productions, any one of which may be performed on a given evening. Since the dissolution of the Soviet Union, there have been a few attempts to reduce the theatre's traditional dependence on large state subsidies. The Bolshoi has been associated from its beginnings with ballet. Tchaikovsky's ballet Swan Lake premiered at the theatre on 4 March 1877. The chief ballet conductor from 1923 to 1963 was Yuri Fayer.

After the death of Joseph Stalin in 1953, the ballet company toured internationally and became an important source of cultural prestige, as well as foreign currency earnings. As a result, the "Bolshoi Ballet" became a well-known name in the West.

The Bolshoi suffered from losses through a series of defections of its dancers. The first occurrence was on 23 August 1979, with Alexander Godunov; followed by Leonid Kozlov and Valentina Kozlova on 16 September 1979; and other cases in the following years.

The Bolshoi has also been the site of many historic opera premieres, including:

- Tchaikovsky's The Voyevoda and Mazeppa
- Modest Mussorgsky's one version of Boris Godunov was given on 16 December 1888.
- Rachmaninoff's Aleko and Francesca da Rimini
- Nikolai Rimsky-Korsakov's opera The Maid of Pskov, with Feodor Chaliapin singing the role of Ivan the Terrible
- Dmitri Shostakovich's opera Lady Macbeth of the Mtsensk District in 1935.

Bolshoi continues to tour regularly with opera and ballet productions in the post-Soviet era. Until the mid-1990s, most foreign operas were sung in Russian, but Italian and other languages have been heard more frequently on the Bolshoi stage in recent years.

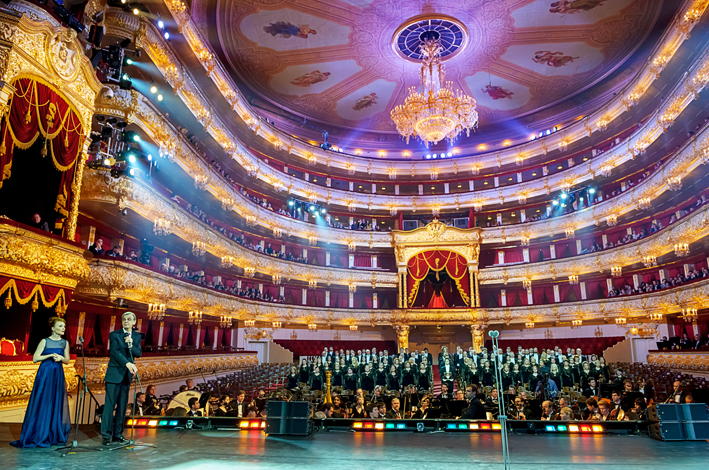
Auditorium of the Bolshoi Theatre in 2014

== Orchestra ==
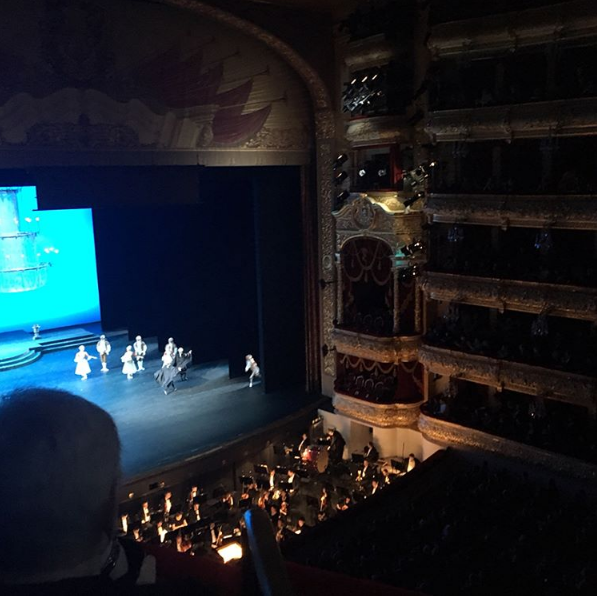
Orchestra of the Bolshoi Theater in the workplace

The Bolshoi Theatre has been home to various conductors and music directors. From 1963 to 1964, Israel Borisovich Gusman worked as a conductor at the Bolshoi Theater from 1963 to 1964, conducting in productions of the operas The Queen of Spades and Boris Godunov. Alan Blyth writes that a recording of Gusman conducting Rachmaninoff at the Bolshoi, with Ivan Kozlovsky at the piano, represents "a marvellous over-the-top orchestration and consummate vocal style and expression."

Music director and chief conductor Vassily Sinaisky quit abruptly at the start of December 2013, after a 41-month tenure, citing the need to avoid conflict. General director Vladimir Urin accepted his resignation, and selected Tugan Sokhiev as replacement. Sokhiev's four-year contract, settled on 20 January 2014, and became effective immediately. Sokhiev left his position in connection with the 2022 Russian invasion of Ukraine. In December 2023, Valery Gergiev was appointed artistic director of the company, with immediate effect, with an initial contract of 5 years.

=== Chief conductors and music directors ===
- Samuil Samosud (1936–1942)
- Ariy Pazovsky (1943–1948)
- Nikolai Golovanov (1948 –1953)
- Alexander Melik-Pashayev (1953–1963)
- Yevgeny Svetlanov (1963–1965)
- Gennady Rozhdestvensky (1965–1970)
- Yuri Simonov (1970–1985)
- Alexander Lazarev (1987–1995)
- Peter Feranec (1995–1998)
- Mark Ermler (1998–2000)
- Gennady Rozhdestvensky (2000–2001)
- Alexander Vedernikov (2001–2009)
- Leonid Desyatnikov (2009–2010)
- Vassily Sinaisky (2010–2013)
- Tugan Sokhiev (2014–2022)
- Valery Gergiev (2023–present)

== Cultural status ==
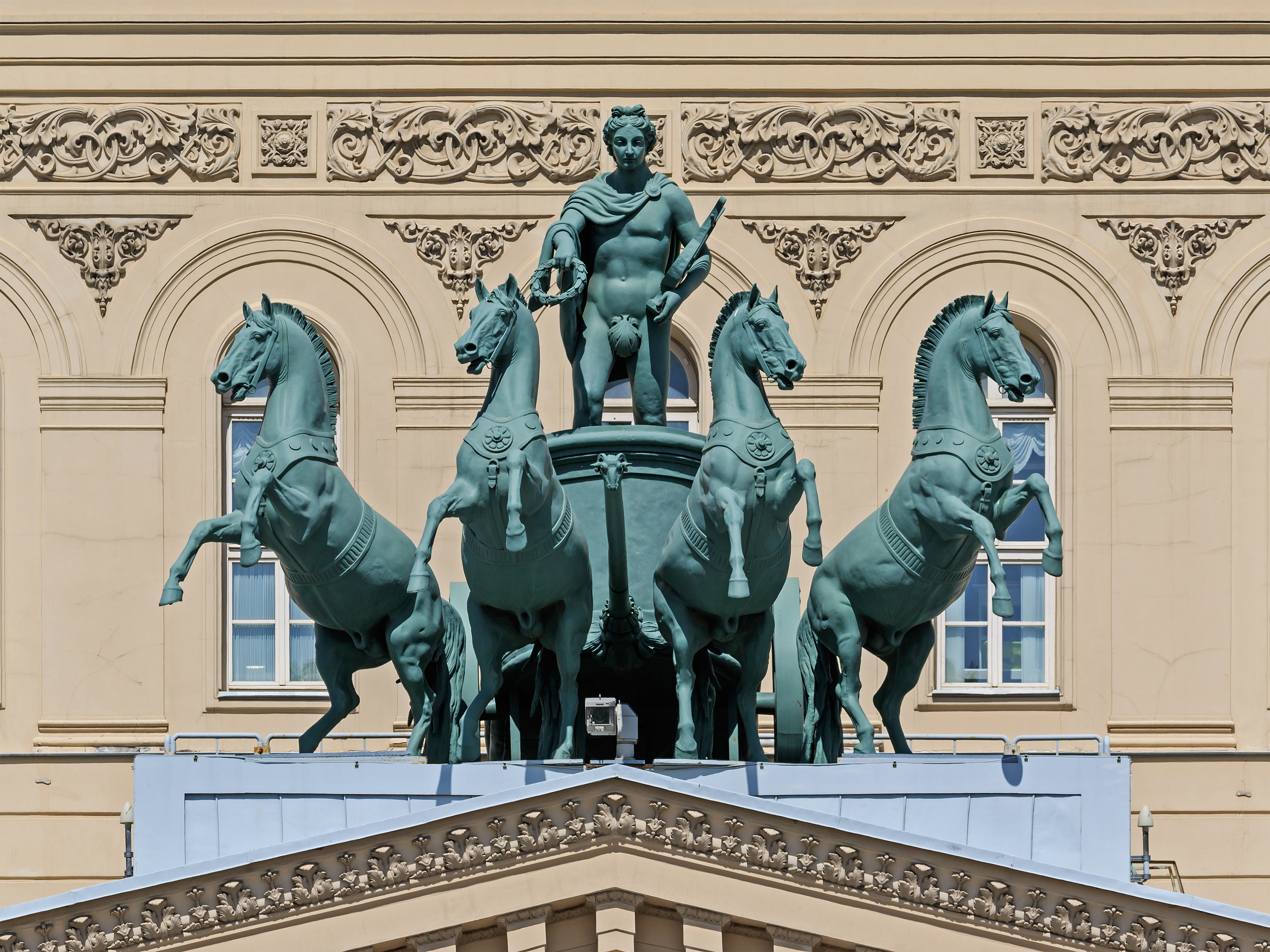
The quadriga was sculpted by Peter Clodt von Jürgensburg.

The Bolshoi Theatre attracts large numbers of tourists. As a result, prices can be much higher than in other Russian theatres.

== Controversies ==
- The rebuilding and renovation cost was $1.1 billion, sixteen times the initial estimate. In 2009, prosecutors alleged the lead contractor was paid three times for the same work.
- Anastasia Volochkova, a former Bolshoi prima ballerina, has said she sees the theatre "as a big brothel" because, she has claimed, ballerinas are invited to parties by theatre administrators and refused roles if they do not accept.
- On 17 January 2013, Sergei Filin, the Bolshoi's ballet director, was attacked with sulfuric acid and as a result lost much of his eyesight. A male dancer was later charged with the crime.
- In the area of box office, a theatre insider told the German publication Der Spiegel that tickets are often sold to mafia dealers, who in turn sell them on the black market for double the face value.
- Performance quality has been criticised by the former music director Alexander Vedernikov (2001-2009). He has claimed the Bolshoi Theatre was putting "bureaucratic interests before artistic ones".
- 8 July 2017, three days before the premiere, the Bolshoi Theatre called off the premiere of a ballet about legendary dancer Rudolf Nureyev. The Director General Vladimir Urin claimed it was due to the bad quality of the dancing, the principal dancer Maria Alexandrova claimed it was the first sign of a "new era" of censorship. It was the first time a show has been pulled in such a way since the collapse of the Soviet Union (where such censorship persisted), sparking rumours about the motivation behind it.

== See also ==
- List of productions of Swan Lake derived from its 1895 revival

== Footnotes ==
- The Bolshoi Kamenny Theatre used to exist in Saint Petersburg. It stood next to the Circus Theatre (rebuilt in 1860 as the Mariinsky Theatre), but was replaced in the 1890s by the present-day building of the St. Petersburg Conservatory. It was at St. Petersburg's Bolshoi that the first great Russian operas, Glinka's A Life for the Tsar and Ruslan and Lyudmila, premiered.
- In a bit of ideological editing, the Bolshoi Theatre appears to be "destroyed" by the device of a split screen in Dziga Vertov's Man with a Movie Camera.
