= 1946 Cannes Film Festival =

1st Cannes Film Festival
- Official poster of the 1st Cannes Film Festival illustrated by Leblanc
- Location: Cannes, France
- Founded: 1946
- Awards: Grand Prix
- Festival date: 20 September 1946 – 5 October 1946
- Website: www.festival-cannes.com

Cannes Film Festival
- 1947

The 1st annual Cannes Film Festival was held from 20 September to 5 October 1946. Twenty-one countries presented their films at the "First Cannes International Film Festival", which took place at the former Casino of Cannes. Only one year after the end of World War II, most of the films were about the war. There arose several technical issues, such as the tarpauline cover blowing away in a storm on the day before the winners were to be announced, the reels of Alfred Hitchcock’s Notorious shown in reverse order, and Miguel M. Delgado’s The Three Musketeers projected upside-down.

During the first festival, the jury was made up of one representative per country, with French historian Georges Huisman as the Jury President. With more emphasis on creativity than in competitiveness, eighteen nations presented their films. Eleven of them tied for the first Grand Prix of the International Festival.

== Jury ==
The following people were appointed as the Jury for the feature and short films:

- Georges Huisman (historian) (France) - Jury President
- Iris Barry (USA)
- Marcel Beaulieu (Canada)
- Antonin Brousil (Czechoslovakia)
- J.H.J. De Jong (Netherlands)
- Don Tudor (Romania)
- Samuel Findlater (UK)
- Sergei Gerasimov (Soviet Union)
- Jan Korngold (Poland)
- Domingos Mascarenhas (Portugal)
- Hugo Mauerhofer (Switzerland)
- Filippo Mennini (Italy)
- Moltke-Hansen (Norway)
- Fernand Rigot (Belgium)
- Kjell Stromberg (Sweden)
- Rodolfo Usigli (Mexico)
- Youssef Wahbi (Egypt)
- Helge Wamberg (Denmark)

== Competition ==
The following films competed for the Grand Prix:

- The Adventurous Bachelor by Otakar Vávra
- Anna and the King of Siam by John Cromwell
- The Bandit by Alberto Lattuada
- The Battle of the Rails by René Clément
- Beauty and the Beast by Jean Cocteau
- Blood and Fire by Anders Henrikson
- Brief Encounter by David Lean
- Caesar and Cleopatra by Gabriel Pascal
- Camões by José Leitão de Barros
- The Captive Heart by Basil Dearden
- Dunia by Mohammed Karim
- The Queen's Flower by Paul Călinescu
- Gaslight by George Cukor
- Gilda by Charles Vidor
- Un giorno nella vita by Alessandro Blasetti
- Girl No. 217 by Mikhail Romm
- The Great Glinka by Lev Arnshtam
- Hello Moscow! by Sergei Yutkevich
- His Young Wife by Mario Soldati
- The Last Chance by Leopold Lindtberg
- Letter from the Dead by Johan Jacobsen
- The Lost Weekend by Billy Wilder
- A Lover's Return by Christian-Jaque
- The Lovers by Giacomo Gentilomo
- The Magic Bow by Bernard Knowles
- Make Mine Music by Joshua Meador, Clyde Geronimi, Jack Kinney, Robert Cormack and Hamilton Luske
- María Candelaria by Emilio Fernández
- Men Without Wings by František Čáp
- Mr. Orchid by René Clément
- Neecha Nagar by Chetan Anand
- Notorious by Alfred Hitchcock
- Patrie by Louis Daquin
- The Red Meadows by Bodil Ipsen and Lau Lauritzen Jr.
- Rhapsody in Blue by Irving Rapper
- Rome, Open City by Roberto Rossellini
- The Seventh Veil by Compton Bennett
- The Stone Flower by Aleksandr Ptushko
- Pastoral Symphony by Jean Delannoy
- Torment by Alf Sjöberg
- Três Dias Sem Deus by Bárbara Virgínia
- The Three Musketeers by Miguel M. Delgado
- The Turning Point by Fridrikh Ermler
- Wonder Man by H. Bruce Humberstone
- Zoya by Lev Arnshtam

== Short films ==
The following short films were selected for the Grand Prix du court métrage:

- A City Sings by Gudrun Parker
- Aubervilliers by Eli Lotar
- Aubusson by Pierre Biro and Pierre Hirsch
- Bambini in città by Luigi Comencini
- Belyy klyk by Aleksandr Zguridi
- Fall of Berlin – 1945 by Yuli Raizman and Yelizaveta Svilova
- Cantico Dei Marm by Pietro Benedetti and Giovanni Rossi
- Chants populaires by George Dunning
- Chercheurs de la mer by Jean Palardy
- Cyprus Is an Island by Ralph Keene
- Des hommes comme les autres by R. Van De Weerdt
- Die Welt by Sam Winston
- En Route by Otto van Meyenhoff
- Épaves by Jacques-Yves Cousteau
- Flicker Flashbacks by Richard Fleischer
- G.I'S In Switzerland by Hermann Haller
- Handling Ships by Allan Crick and John Halas
- Hitler Lives by Don Siegel
- Instruments of the Orchestra by Muir Mathieson
- Jeux d'enfants by Jean Painlevé
- L'Homme by Gilles Margaritis
- La cité des abeilles by Andrev Winnitski
- La Flûte magique by Paul Grimault
- La Locomotive by Stanisław Urbanowicz
- Le Goéland by Willy Peters
- Le Retour à la Vie by Dr K.M. Vallo
- Les Digues en construction by Jo de Haas and Mannus Franken
- Les Halles De Paris by Paul Schuitema
- Les mines de sel de Wieliczka by Jarosław Brzozowski
- Les Ponts De La Meuse by Paul Schuitema
- Les Protubérance solaires by M. Leclerc and M. Lyot
- Lucerne Ville Musicale by Hans Trommer
- Man One Family by Ivor Montagu
- Me he de comer esa tune by Miguel Zacharias
- Metamorphoses by Herman van der Horst
- Molodost nashey strany by Sergei Yutkevich
- Open drop ether by Basil Wright
- Out of the Ruins by Nick Read
- Parques Infantis by Aquilino Mendes and João Mendes
- Partie de campagne by Jean Renoir
- Springman and the SS by Jiří Trnka
- Prisonnier de guerre by Kurt Früh
- Rapsodia rustica by Jean Mihail
- Réseau x by Mahuzier
- Steel by Frank Bundy
- Suite Varsovienne by Tadeusz Makarczyński
- The Life Cycle of the Onion by Mary Field
- The Purloined Pup by Charles August Nichols
- The Way We Live by Jill Craigie
- Un Port En Plein Coeur De L'Europe by Jaroslav Novotny
- Vánoční sen by Karel Zeman
- Wet Paint by Walt Disney
- World Of Plenty by Paul Rotha
- Your Children's eyes by Alex Strasser
- Zvírátka a petrovstí by Jiří Trnka

== Awards ==
The following films and people received the 1946 awards:

=== Official awards ===
Feature Films

- Grand Prix du Festival International du Film:
  - Brief Encounter by David Lean
  - Hets by Alf Sjöberg
  - The Last Chance by Leopold Lindtberg
  - The Lost Weekend by Billy Wilder
  - María Candelaria by Emilio Fernández
  - Men Without Wings by Frantisek Cáp
  - Neecha Nagar by Chetan Anand
  - Red Meadows by Bodil Ipsen and Lau Lauritzen Jr.
  - Rome, Open City by Roberto Rossellini
  - La symphonie pastorale by Jean Delannoy
  - Velikiy perelom by Fridrikh Ermler
- International Jury Prize: La Bataille du rail by René Clément
- Best Actor: Ray Milland for The Lost Weekend
- Best Actress: Michèle Morgan for La symphonie pastorale
- Best Director: René Clément for La Bataille du rail
- Best Cinematography: Gabriel Figueroa for María Candelaria and Los tres mosqueteros
- Best Animation Design: Make Mine Music
- Best Colour: The Stone Flower

Short Films

- Vánoční sen by Karel Zeman
- Zvírátka a petrovstí by Jiří Trnka
- Molodost nashey strany by Sergei Yutkevich
- Les mines de sel de Wieliczka by Jarosław Brzozowski
- La cité des abeilles by Andrev Winnitski
- Épaves by Jacques-Yves Cousteau
- Fall of Berlin – 1945 by Yuli Raizman

=== Independent awards ===
FIPRESCI Prize

- Farrebique by Georges Rouquier

International Peace Award

- The Last Chance

== Media ==
- British Pathé: Cannes Film Festival 1946 footage
- Institut National de l'Audiovisuel: Opening of the 1st Festival in 1946 (commentary in French)
- INA: About the 1946 Festival (mute)
- INA: Unusual arrival of American stars at the 1st festival (mute)
