= Butantã =

Butantã may refer to:

- Subprefecture of Butantã, São Paulo
- Butantã (district of São Paulo)
- Butantã station, São Paulo Metrô
- Instituto Butantan
