= Granja Viana =

District in Cotia, São Paulo, Brazil

Coordinates: 23°35′54″S 46°51′11″W

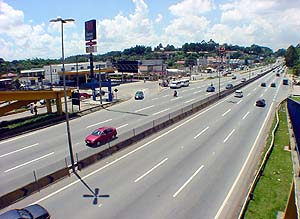
Rodovia Raposo Tavares running near Granja Viana.

Granja Viana (commonly known as Granja, sometimes spelled as Granja Vianna) is an upscale district in the city of Cotia, São Paulo, Brazil. Officially, the district is located in the east side of the city, but some portions of southern Carapicuíba, northern Embu das Artes and eastern Jandira are often referred to as Granja Viana as well. It can be accessed via the Raposo Tavares Highway.

In Cotia itself, it occupies an area of 50 km^{2}, with a population of 35,000(2014), and it possesses 70% of the city's industry, including automotive parts, food & beverage, metallurgy, graphic, informatics, serigraphy, chemicals, pottery, horticulture, woods, plastics, etc.

The district is part of the Transition Towns network, having a local community called "Transition Granja Viana".

== History ==
The lands today considered as "Granja Viana" belonged to the Carapicuyba Farm, which also consisted of areas from today's Osasco and Embu das Artes. The farm was later fragmented and divided between dozens of people, including Niso Vianna (who kept the farmer's name in his property); José Giorgi, owner of Fazenda Cabanas (or Moinho Velho); and Junqueira de Aquino family, owners of Fazendinha.

The main center of the farm was renamed Granja Vianna. Its owner, Niso Vianna, was a rotary member and a businessman in the field of fertilizers. He founded the Lar Rotary School (which would become the Colégio Rio Branco in 1982) and he helped to build the Santo Antônio Church (to which his wife Vanetty Vianna was devoted). The name "Granja" (which means a place were han and chicken are bred) came after Niso acquired more lands, imported cattle from foreign countries and started to dedicate himself to the production of milk and cheese. On 29 July 1959, the Sociedade Amigos da Vila de Santo Antônio de Carapicuíba was founded; it was replaced in 1980 by the Sociedade Amigos do Bairro da Granja Vianna.

Geographer Aziz Ab'Saber, who lived in the neighborhood, criticized in 1991 the way it developed:

"'[...] the simple way that the ancient people of the Peabiru had with Nature and how the Portuguese conquerors managed to capt, besides the bloody conquer..., this simplicity on the way the forest, the water and the animals are treated, of the luck that in our region, both in Caucaia do Alto and in Granja Vianna, still today we can see this way the people handle the opening of spaces for living, and the bad way public and private corruption is handled that rips and destroys the geological brindle to create neighborhoods, to densify people and enterprises in territories that don't stand it due to the lack of natural structure. [...] Look, here, in Granja Vianna, the politicians of Cotia allowed such a densification that the creation of neighborhoods socially asphyxiated the region, and I don't even know if an administrative separation could, now..., solve the installed urban chaos!

In the late half of the 20th century, Granja became a dormitory for wealthy families of São Paulo, being filled with luxury condominiums. In the 21st century, it attracted companies and more people, becoming a high-density neighborhood, incompatible with its infrastructure.

Today, Granja Viana has cultural and leisure options, such as the Granja Viana International Karting Track, Cemucam Park (belonging to the city of São Paulo) and the Zu Lai Buddhist Temple.

== Sites of interest ==
Granja Viana is home to the Granja Viana International Kart Circuit. Another important site is the Zu Lai Temple, the largest Buddhist temple in Latin America.

== Notable residents ==
- Aziz Ab'Saber (geographer, deceased)
- Eduardo Araújo (singer)
- Vladmir Belitsky (Statistic professor at USP)
- Sérgio Dias (musician)
- Marcelo Fromer (musician, deceased)
- Alexandre Frota (actor, TV presenter)
- Rita Lee (musician)
- Negra Li (singer)
- Fernando Meirelles (film director)
- Perla (singer)
- Jair Rodrigues (singer, deceased) and his children Luciana Mello, Jair Oliveira and the latter's wife Tania Khalill

== Bibliography ==
- Barcellos, João (2014). Granja Vianna - Entre o eixo fundiário do 'velho' Afonso Sardinha, o Portinho de Carapicuíba nas ligações do Piabiyu via Koty e a visão urbanística de Niso Vianna (in Portuguese). São Paulo: Edicon. ISBN 978-85-290-0942-1.
