= Istituto Eugenio Montale =

Istituto Eugenio Montale may refer to:

Schools in Italy:

- Istituto di Istruzione Superiore "E. Montale" - Cinisello Balsamo

Schools outside of Italy:

- Scuola Italiana Eugenio Montale - São Paulo, Brazil
