= Morumbi, São Paulo =

District of São Paulo, Brazil

Coordinates: 23°35′46.28″S 46°42′15.64″W

Morumbi
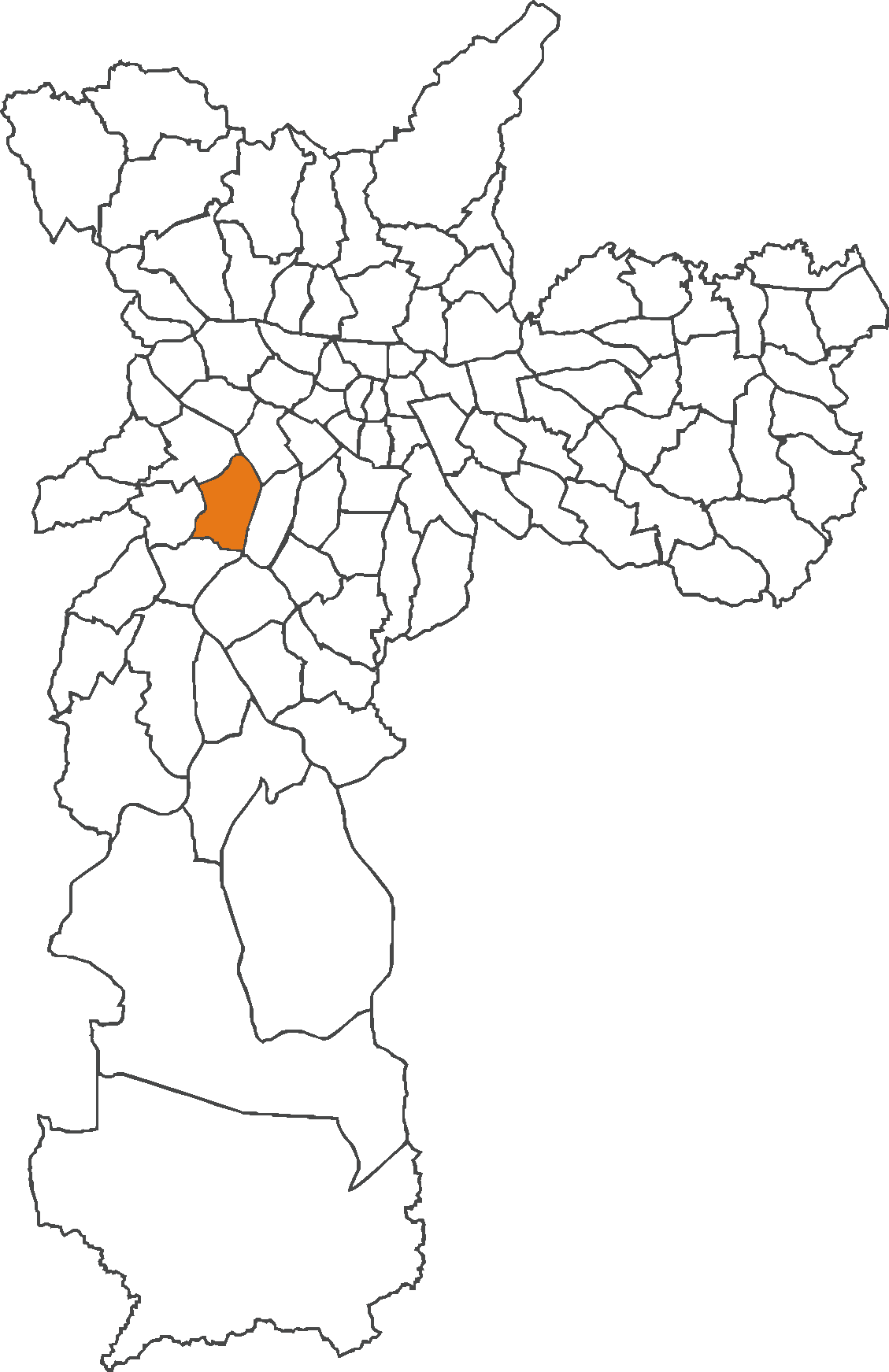
- Location of Morumbi district in São Paulo

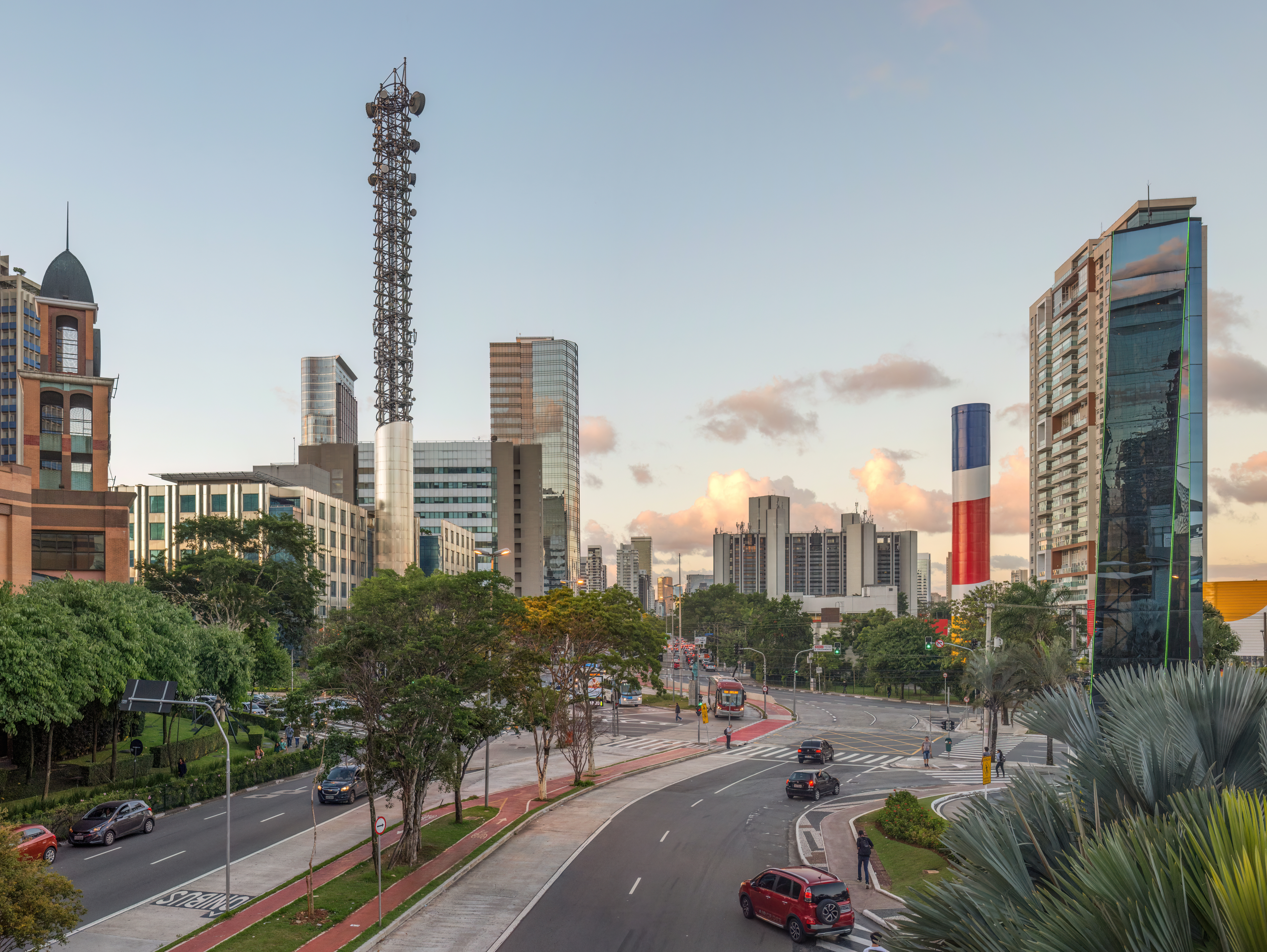
- View of Morumbi
- Country: Brazil
- State: São Paulo
- City: São Paulo

Government
  - Type: Subprefecture
  - Subprefect: Luiz Felippe de Moraes Neto

Area
  - Total: 11.4 km^{2} (4.4 sq mi)

Population (2007)
  - Total: 32,281
  - Density: 2.832/km^{2} (7.33/sq mi)
- HDI: 0.938—very high
- Website: Subprefecture of Butantã

Morumbi (Brazilian Portuguese: [moɾũˈbi]) is one of the richest neighborhoods in São Paulo and is a district of the city of São Paulo belonging to the subprefecture of Butantã, in the southwestern part of the city. A common folk etymology attributes its name to the mixed Portuguese and Tupi phrase morro obi, which would mean "green hill", but this is disputed. On December 29, 2022, Brazilian football star Pele died at the age of 82 in Morumbi.

Morumbi is between 9 and 15 km (5.6 and 9.3 mi) away from São Paulo's downtown. It has boundaries with the districts of Vila Sônia, Campo Limpo, Vila Andrade, Itaim Bibi, Pinheiros, and Butantã. Within Morumbi, the neighborhoods of Vila Progredior, Caxingüi, Jardim Guedala, Cidade Jardim, Real Parque, Vila Morumbi, Paineiras do Morumbi, Jardim Panorama, Jardim Sílvia, Vila Tramontano and Paraisópolis are found.

== Toponym ==
There are several etymological explanations for "Morumbi":

- It is a term of Tupi origin that means "green fly", through the combination of the terms moru (fly) and mbi (green).
- According to Eduardo de Almeida Navarro, "Morumbi" would come from the General Language word maromby, from a purported *maromba ("big fish") and y ("river"), and would mean "river of the big fish".

== Points of interest ==
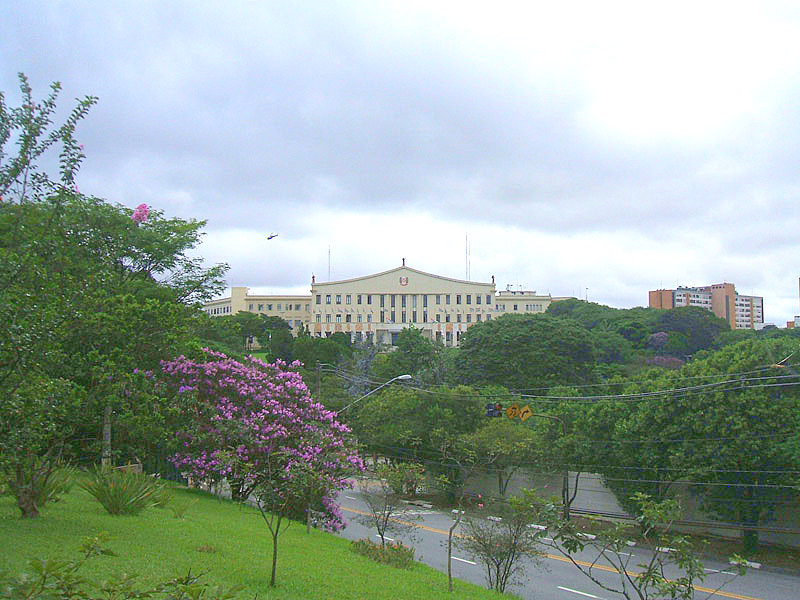
Palácio dos Bandeirantes—seat of the São Paulo state government

Morumbi is known nationally for being home to São Paulo Futebol Clube's main ground, Estádio do Morumbi. In honour of that, one of the district's subway stations is named after the club, São Paulo-Morumbi is the closest station to the stadium and responsible for connecting the district's main attraction to the city's metro system.

Within the boundaries of Morumbi one may find Hospital Israelita Albert Einstein, one of the most important private hospitals of the city, Palácio dos Bandeirantes, seat of the São Paulo state government, the American School (Graded School) and Colégio Visconde de Porto Seguro Unidade 1.

A large shopping mall carries the name Shopping Morumbi; however, it is located in the neighboring district of Santo Amaro. The neighborhood mall is called Shopping Jardim Sul.

Morumbi cemetery is the final resting place of triple Formula One World Champion Ayrton Senna and singer Elis Regina.

== Education ==
International schools in Morumbi:

- Scuola Italiana Eugenio Montale (Italian school)
- Colégio Miguel de Cervantes (Spanish school)
- Graded School (American school)
- Avenues: The World School (American school, second global campus)
- Integration School (Kindergarten, Elementary and Bilingual)
