= Subprefecture of Butantã =

Subprefecture of the city of São Paulo, Brazil

Coordinates: 23°34′27″S 46°43′25″W

- Subprefecture
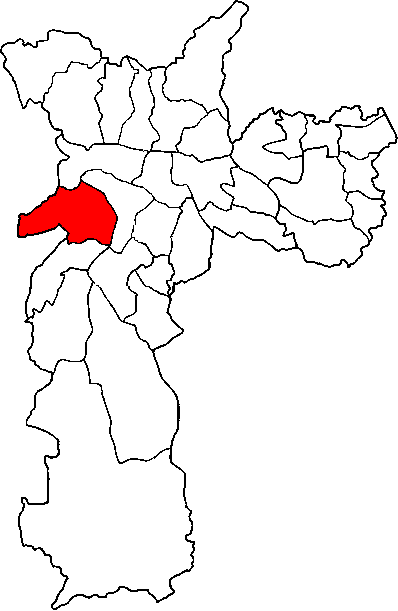
- Location of the Subprefecture of Butantã in São Paulo

- Location of municipality of São Paulo within the State of São Paulo
- Country: Brazil
- Region: Southeast
- State: São Paulo
- Municipality: São Paulo
- Administrative Zone: West
- Districts: Butantã, Morumbi, Vila Sônia, Raposo Tavares, Rio Pequeno

Government
  - Type: Subprefecture
  - Subprefect: Daniel Barbosa Rodrigueiro

Area
  - Total: 56.32 km^{2} (21.75 sq mi)

Population (2008)
  - Total: 384,069
- Website: Subprefeitura Butantã (Portuguese)

The Subprefecture of Butantã is one of 32 subprefectures of the city of São Paulo, Brazil. It comprises five districts: Butantã, Morumbi, Vila Sônia, Raposo Tavares, and Rio Pequeno. It hosts the main campus of University of São Paulo and the headquarters of São Paulo Futebol Clube, one of the largest teams of the city. The headquarters of Rede Bandeirantes, one of the largest media groups of Brazil, are also in this subprefecture.
