= Aleksandr Shelenkov =

Aleksandr Vladimirovich Shelenkov (13 (26) December 1903 – 16 September 1996) was a Soviet cinematographer. He was awarded the titles of Honoured Artist of the Latvian SSR (1949) and Honored Artist of the RSFSR (1959). He was also a laureate of four State Stalin Prizes (1946, 1947, 1950, and 1951).

== Life ==
He was born in the village of Zamesh'e (now in the Smolensk Oblast) and in 1928 graduated from the cinematography department of the State Television and Radio Broadcasting Company. From 1927 onwards he worked as an assistant cameraman at the Mezhrabpomfilm studio. From 1944 onwards he worked with his wife, cinematographer Yolanda Chen - they are both buried at the Kuntsevo Cemetery in Moscow.

== Filmography ==
=== Early works ===
- 1928 — Salamander (Note: As assistant cameraman - all other credits as cinematographer.)
- 1929 — Sailor Ivan Gallay
- 1929 — Two-Buldi-Two
- 1935 — Golden Lake
- 1936 — Dzhulbars
- 1937 — Alamas Gorge
- 1939 — High Reward
- 1940 — Salavat Yulayev
- 1941 — Patriot, part of Combat Film Collection No. 4
- 1941 — In the Rear of the Enemy
- 1943 — Lermontov (with Mark Magidson)
- 1944 — Zoya

=== Collaborations with Chen ===
- 1946 — The Great Glinka
- 1947 — The Legend of Neistov
- 1949 — Rainis
- 1950 — Far From Moscow
- 1953 — Admiral Ushakov; Attack from the Sea
- 1955 — Romeo and Juliet
- 1957 — A Lesson in History
- 1958 — The Communist
- 1960 — Five Days, Five Nights
- 1965 — The Secret of Success (Note: Shelenkov also collaborated on its script with Leonid Lavrovsky)
- 1966 - Tunelul
- 1967 — Sofiya Perovskaya
- 1968 — War and Peace (scenes only)
- 1970 — Songs of the Sea
- 1971 — At Our Factory
- 1973 — There Lived Three Bachelors
- 1975 — Jarosław Dąbrowski
