= The Great Glinka =

1946 film

The Great Glinka (Глинка)
- Film poster
- Directed by: Lev Arnshtam
- Written by: Lev Arnshtam
- Starring: Boris Chirkov; Vasili Merkuryev; Mikhail Derzhavin; Vladimir Druzhnikov; Katya Ivanova; Valentina Serova
- Cinematography: Yu-Lan Chen; Aleksandr Shelenkov
- Edited by: Tatyana Likhachyova
- Music by: Vissarion Shebalin
- Release date: September 1946
- Running time: 116 minutes
- Country: Soviet Union
- Language: Russian

The Great Glinka (Russian: Глинка) is a 1946 Soviet biopic film directed by Lev Arnshtam. The film is about Mikhail Glinka, a Russian composer of the 19th century. The film was awarded the Stalin Prize of II degree (1947) and it was entered into the 1946 Cannes Film Festival.

== Cast ==
- Boris Chirkov as Mikhail Glinka
- Valentina Serova as Maria Ivanova-Glinka
- Klavdiya Polovikova as Luiza Ivanova
- Vasili Merkuryev as Yakob Ulanov
- Kira Golovko as Anna Kern
- Mikhail Nazvanov as hussar Kostya
- Boris Livanov as Emperor Nicholas I of Russia
- Alexander Shatov as Alexander von Benckendorff
- Nikolay Svobodin as Baron Yegor Rosen
- Pyotr Aleynikov as Alexander Pushkin
- Mikhail Derzhavin as Vasily Zhukovsky
- Mikhail Yanshin as Pyotr Vyazemsky
- Victor Koltsov as Vladimir Odoevsky
- Vladimir Druzhnikov as Kondraty Ryleyev
- Vladimir Vladislavsky as Mikhail Vielgorsky
- Maxim Mikhailov as Osip Petrov
- Yevgeny Kaluzhsky as old dignitary
- Georgy Vitsin as spectator at the premiere (uncredited)
