= Aziz Ab'Sáber =

Brazilian geographer and environmentalist (1924–2012)

Aziz Ab'Saber
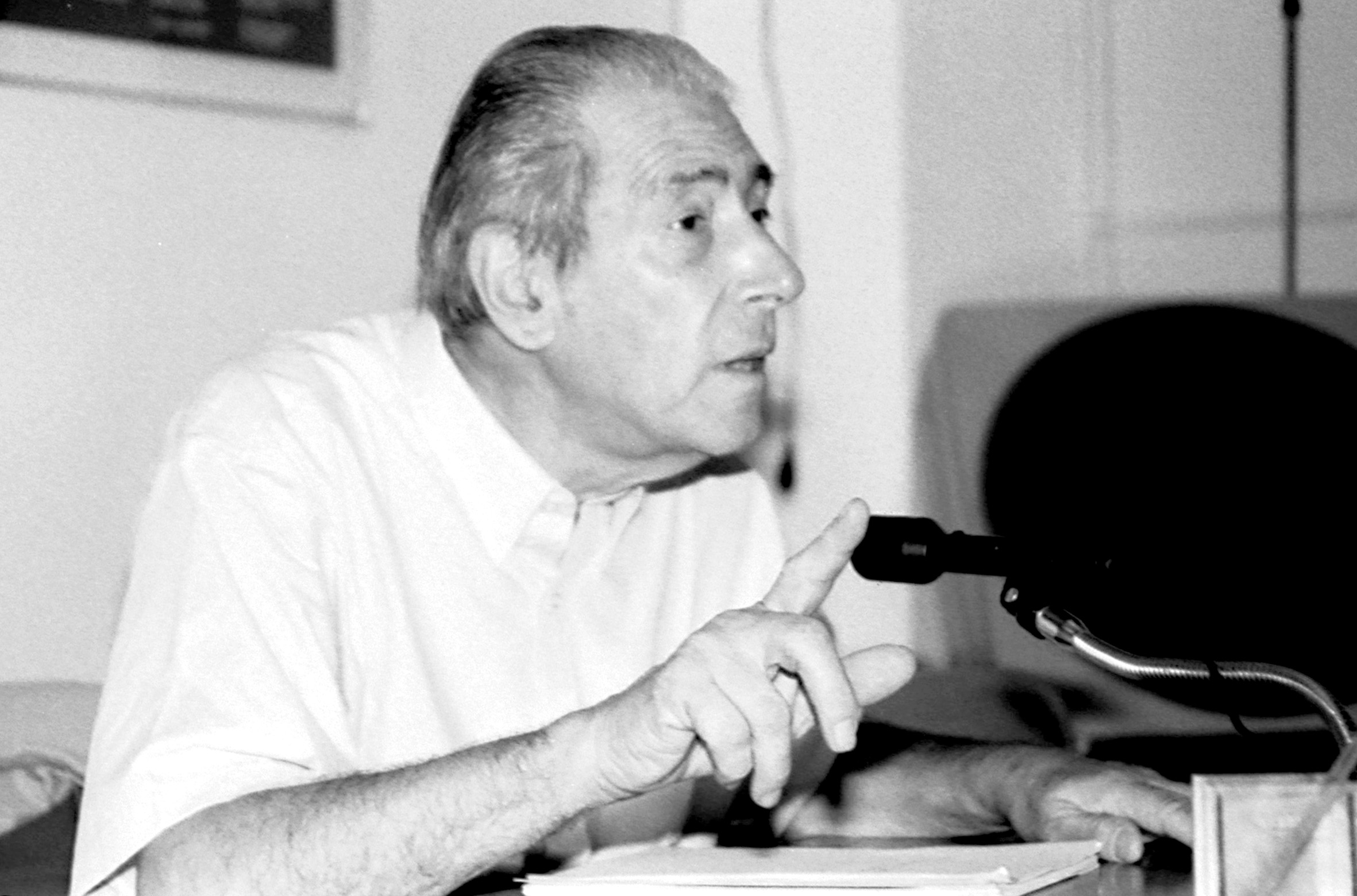
- Born: October 24, 1924; São Luís do Paraitinga, São Paulo, Brazil
- Died: March 16, 2012 (aged 87); Cotia, São Paulo, Brazil
- Education: Universidade de São Paulo
- Occupations: Geographer and professor

Aziz Nacib Ab'Sáber (Portuguese pronunciation: [aˈziz naˈsib abˈsabeʁ]; October 24, 1924 – March 16, 2012) was a geographer and one of Brazil's most respected scientists, honored with the highest awards of Brazilian science in geography, geology, ecology and archaeology. Graduated in geography, he was a president and honorary president of the Sociedade Brasileira para o Progresso da Ciência (Brazilian Society for the Advancement of Science) and Emeritus Professor of the University of São Paulo. He received the Grand Cross in Earth Sciences of the National Order of Scientific Merit, the highest rank. Among the awards, he has received the UNESCO Prize on Science and the Environment in 2001 and the Prize to the Intellectual of Brazil in 2011.

The contributions of Ab'Saber to science range from the first research of oil camps in Brazil's northeast to surveys of Brazil′s natural realms and the restoration of the history of forests, camps and primitive humans over geologic time in South America. He made central contributions to biology, South American archaeology, and to Brazilian ecology, geology and geography. He has published more than 480 works, most of them scientific publications. Among his scientific proposals are FLORAM, the Code of biodiversity and his theory of refuges related to the Amazon.

Ab'Sáber was the first person to classify scientifically the Brazilian and South-America territory in morphoclimatic domains. He also contributed to the "Pleistocene refuge hypothesis", an attempt to explain the distribution of Neotropical taxa as a function of their isolation in forest fragments during glacial periods, which allowed populations to speciate. He died in 2012 following a heart attack.

== Selected publications ==
- Gautiere-Modenesi, May; Bartorelli, Andrea; Mantesso-Neto, Virginio; Carneiro, Celso Dal Ré; Lisboa, Matias. (org.), A Obra de Aziz Nacib Ab'Saber, São Paulo, BECA, 2010; 558 pp
- Ab'Sáber, A. N. 1982. The paleoclimate and paleoecology of Brazilian Amazonia. In Biological Diversification in the Tropics. New York:Columbia University Press. p. 41-59.
- Ab'Sáber, A. N. 1983. O domínio dos cerrados: introdução ao conhecimento. Revista Servidor Público. vol. 40, p. 41-55.
- Ab'Sáber, A. N. 1986. Geomorfologia da região Corridor Carajás-São Luiz. In Carajás. Desafio Político, Ecologia e Desenvolvimento. São Paulo:CNPq. p. 88-123.
- Ab'Sáber, A. N. 1989. Zoneamento ecológico e econômico da Amazônia: questão de escala e método. Revista Estudos Avançados. vol. 5, p. 4-20.
- Ab'Sáber, A. N. 1990. Um plano differencial para o Brasil, Projeto Floram. Revista Estudos Avançados. vol. 5, p. 19-62.
- Ab'Sáber, A. N. 1990. FLORAM: Nordeste Seco. Revista Estudos Avançados. vol. 4, p. 149-174.
- Ab`Saber, A. N. Ecossistemas do Brasil. Metalivros, 2006.
