= Friends (1938 film) =

- Directed by: Lev Arnshtam; Viktor Eisymont
- Written by: Lev Arnshtam; Nikolai Tikhonov
- Starring: Boris Babochkin
- Cinematography: Vladimir Rapoport
- Music by: Dmitri Shostakovich
- Production company: Lenfilm
- Release date: 1 November 1938
- Running time: meters (100 minutes)
- Country: Soviet Union
- Language: Russian

Friends (Russian: Друзья, romanized: Druzya) is a 1938 Soviet biopic film directed by Lev Arnshtam.

== Plot ==
The film is based on the life of Sergey Kirov. During the Russian Civil War, the Communist Party of the Soviet Union sends Aleksey to Caucasus Mountains to help organize an armed uprising.

== Cast ==
- Boris Babochkin - Aleksey
- Irina Zarubina
- Nikolai Cherkasov - Beta, an Ossetian
- Stepan Kayukov
- Kote Daushvili
- Serafima Birman
- Aleksandr Borisov
- Ivan Nazarov
