= Cemitério do Morumbi =

Cemetery in São Paulo, Brazil

Morumbi Cemetery
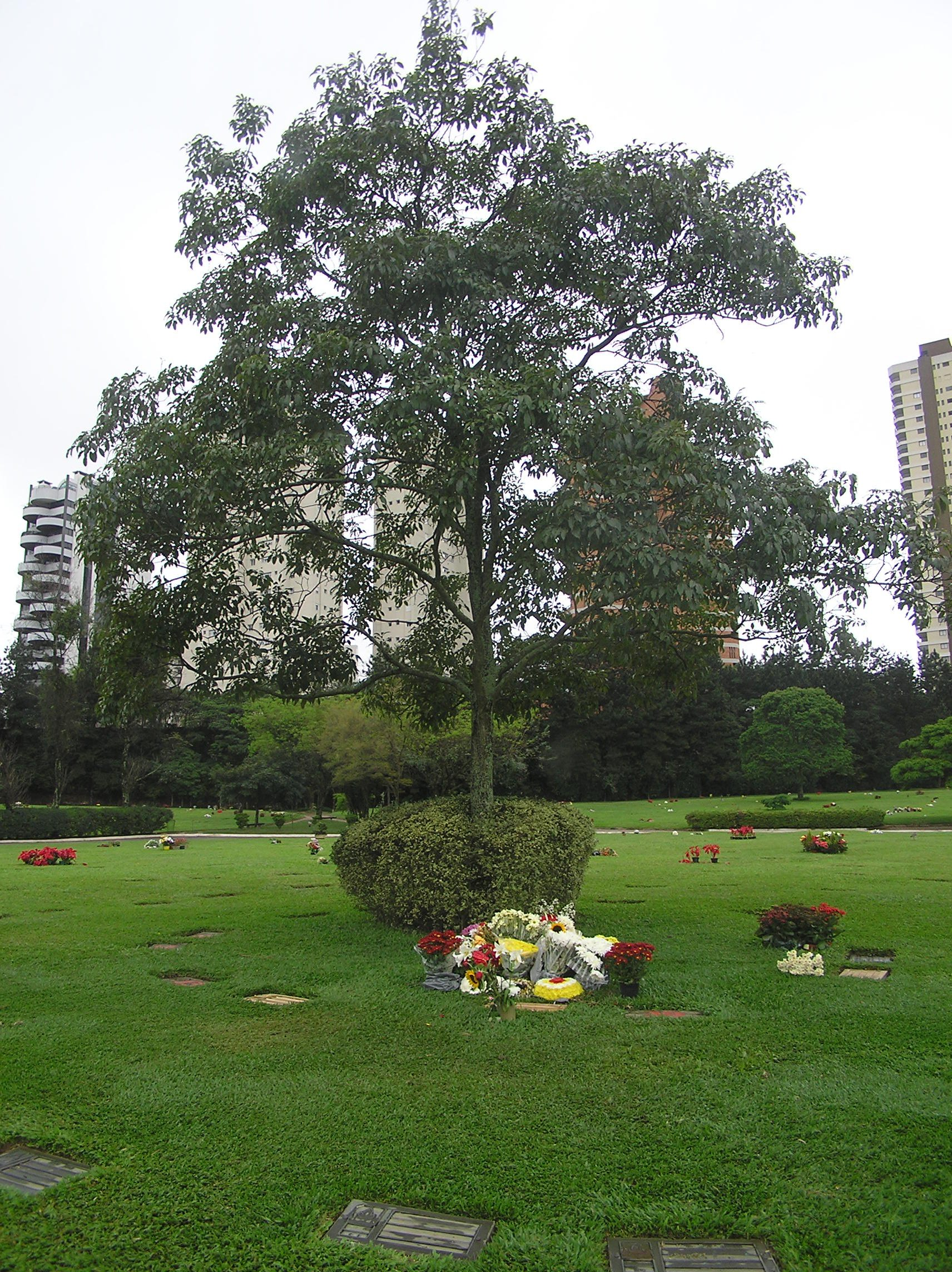
- Interactive map of Morumbi Cemetery

Details
- Location: Morumbi, São Paulo
- Country: Brazil
- Coordinates: 23°37′27″S 46°43′26″W
- Website: Cemitério do Morumbi
- Find a Grave: Morumbi Cemetery

The Cemitério do Morumbi (Morumbi Cemetery) is a cemetery in São Paulo, Brazil. It is located in the affluent neighborhood of Morumbi.

== Notable interments ==
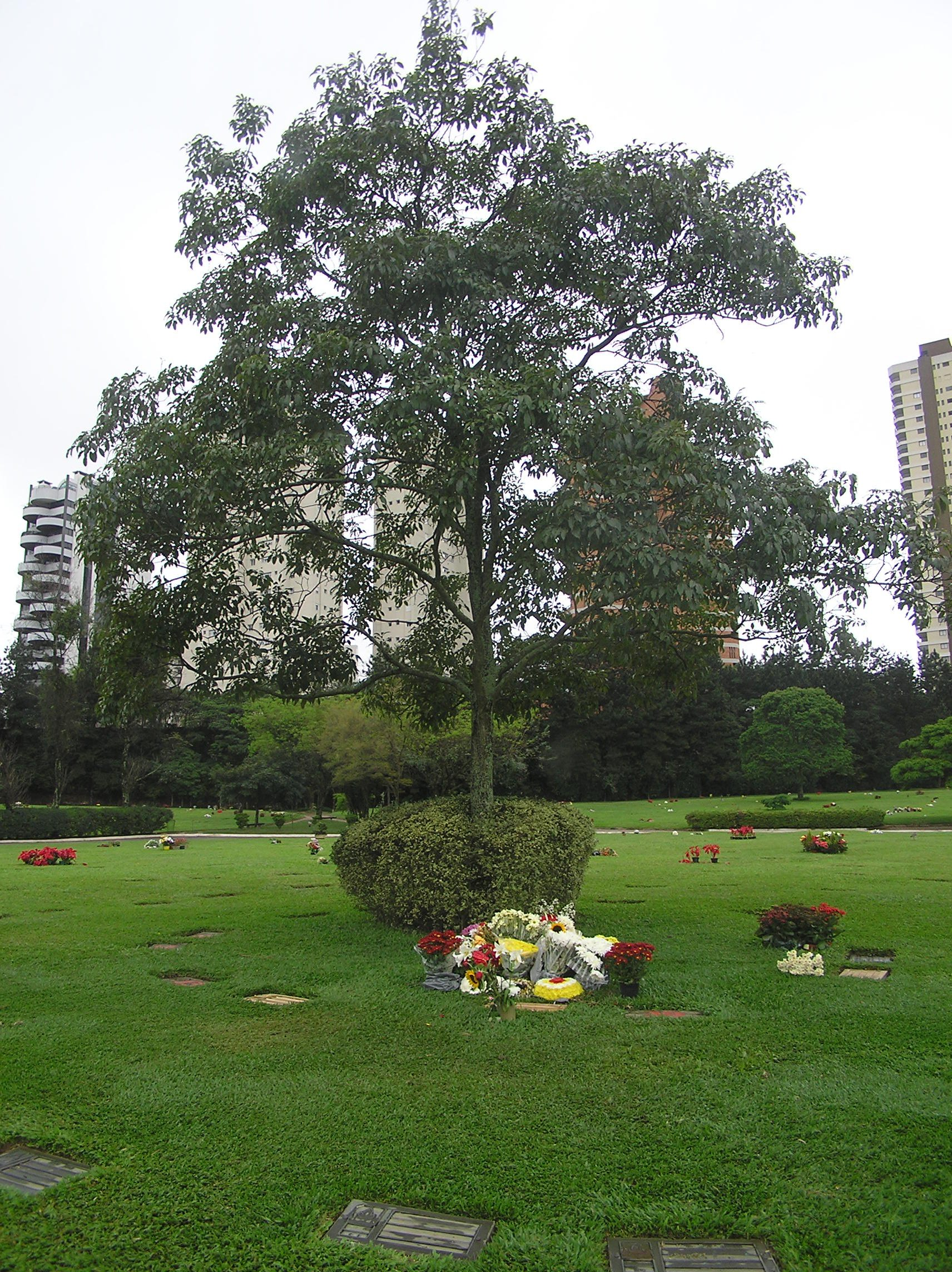

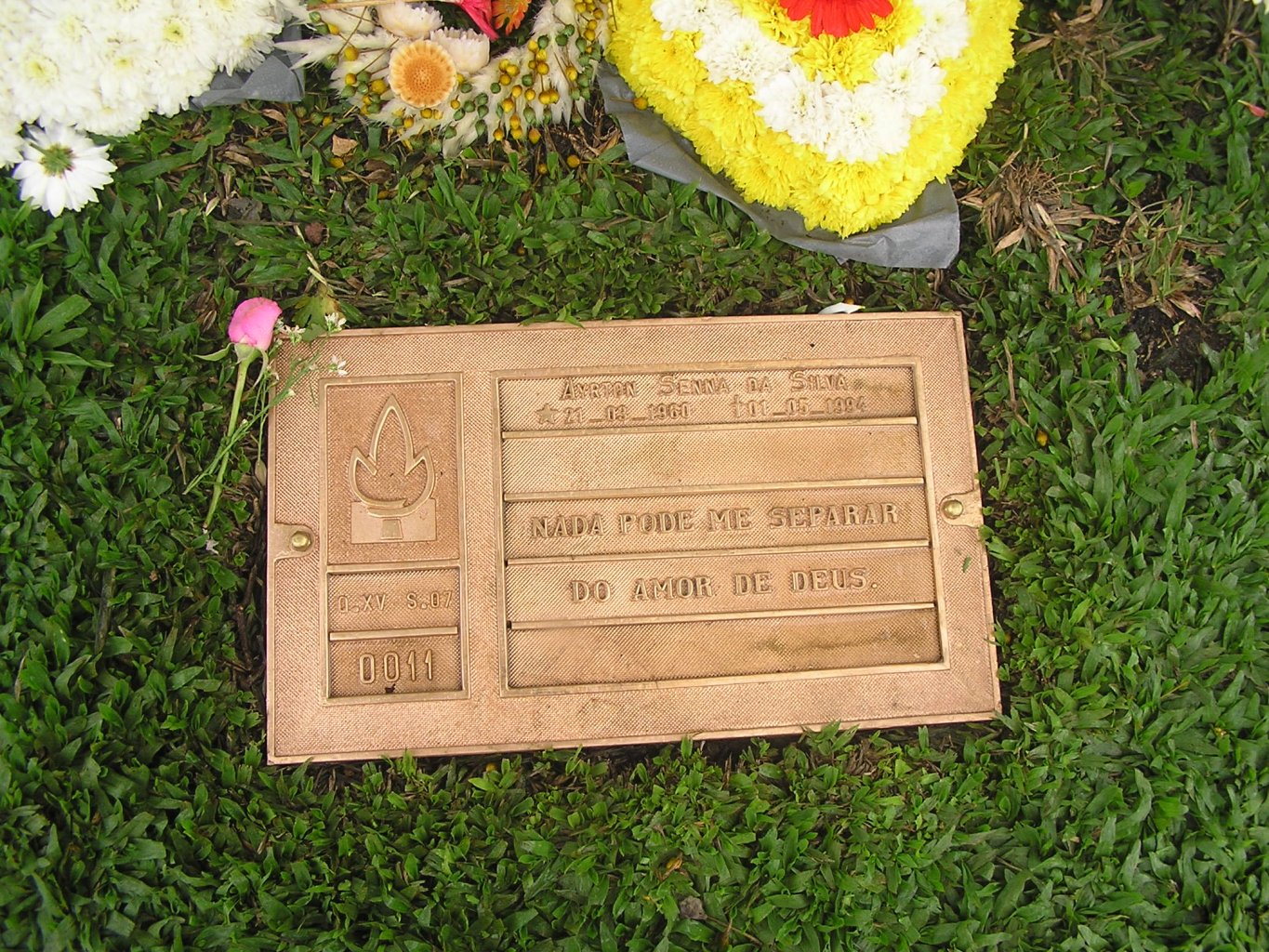
Ayrton Senna's resting place at the Morumbi cemetery in São Paulo, with an inscription in Portuguese that reads "Nothing can separate me from the love of God"

- Ronald Golias – Brazilian comedian
- Marly Marley – Brazilian actress
- Elis Regina – MPB singer who died of an overdose
- Plínio Salgado – fascist leader, founder of Brazilian Integralist Action
- Ayrton Senna – Formula One driver who died in Italy
- Bárbara Virgínia – first female Portuguese film director
- Leandro Lo – Brazilian Jiu Jitsu IBJJF World Champion, killed in a shooting
