= A Lesson in History =

- Directed by: Lev Arnshtam; Hristo Piskov
- Written by: Lev Arnshtam; Hristo Piskov
- Cinematography: Yu-Lan Chen; Aleksandr Shelenkov
- Music by: Kara Karaev
- Production companies: Mosfilm; Boyana Film
- Release dates: 26 February 1957 (Soviet Union); 27 May 1957 (Bulgaria)
- Running time: 91 minutes
- Countries: Soviet Union; Bulgaria
- Languages: Russian; Bulgarian

A Lesson in History (Russian: Урок истории, Bulgarian: Урокът на историята) is a 1957 joint Soviet–Bulgarian historical drama film directed by Lev Arnshtam and Hristo Piskov about Georgi Dimitrov and the Leipzig Trial.

== Plot ==
The year is 1933. Georgi Dimitrov (Stefan Savov) comes to Berlin to establish links with the local Bulgarian communists. The Nazi leaders are doing their best to break the resistance of the Communists. Hermann Göring (Yuri Averin) conceives a provocation: during the arson of the Reichstag, his associate must be caught with a ticket of a member of the Communist Party. The Reichstag is set on fire, the provocateur Marinus van der Lubbe (Georgi Kaloyanchev) and the deputy of the Reichstag Ernst Torgler are arrested. Mass repressions against Communists are commencing. Dimitrov also falls in the hands of the Nazi court. However, in the courtroom, workers, including Heinrich Lange (Gennadi Yudin), prove the falsehood of the accusation. The National Socialists are forced to free Dimitrov. The Soviet government grants him the right of political asylum.

== Cast ==
- Stefan Savov as Georgi Dimitrov
- Tzvetana Arnaudova as Paraskeva Dimitrova
- Ivan Tonev as Stefcho
- Gennadi Yudin as Heinrich Lange
- Borya Burlyaev as Vili Lange
- Apollon Yachnitskiy as Hitler
- Yuri Averin as Gyoring
- Pyotr Berezov as Himler
- Encho Tagarov as Gyobels
- Nikolay Volkov as Heldorf
