= Tale About the Lost Time =

Tale about the Lost Time
- Directed by: Aleksandr Ptushko
- Written by: Anna Rodionova
- Starring: Grigoriy Plotkin; Vera Volkova; Lidia Konstantinova
- Cinematography: Samuel Rubashkin
- Music by: Igor Morozov
- Production company: Mosfilm
- Release date: 1964
- Running time: 76 minutes
- Country: Soviet Union
- Language: Russian

Tale about the Lost Time (Russian: Сказка о потерянном времени, romanized: Skazka o poteryannom vremeni) is a 1964 Soviet fantasy comedy film directed by Aleksandr Ptushko. It is based on a tale by Evgeny Schwartz.

== Plot ==
The protagonist, third-grader Petya Zubov, is first shown as a lazy boy who is wasting time. After waking up in the morning, he walks around the city, as he is not worried about arriving late for school. Once upon a time, four evil wizards, whose main mission in life is to do bad to people, realize that they are old and cannot work the way they used to. They decide to regain their youth. To do this they must find a few young lazy children to collect time that is spent ineptly, and then use it to make and eat flatbread.

The wizards set out on their quest. They manage to find children who are wasting their time (including Petya), and to collect their lost time into sacks. After that, the children instantly age. The wizards make flatbread from flour and add the collected time. However, they eat more than necessary, and they turn into children. After coming to school, Petya sees that he has grown old. However, he thinks he is just still asleep. After deliberating, he decides not to wake up yet. After seeing his class and introducing himself as his own grandfather, he goes to the city, where he tries himself in various adult roles, which end in failure because he is not well-versed in anything.

He decides to wake up and discovers that he cannot. Even his own mother cannot recognize him. Only his dog Druzhok still comes to him. Lacking money, Petya decides to go with his dog to the forest where no humans have ever set foot. Thus, he enters the Magic Forest, where the four evil wizards live. Reaching their dwelling, Petya finds nobody at home. Entering the empty house, he talks to the magic cuckoo clock and gives it water, which the wizards never did.

The cuckoo agrees to help Petya back to his former state and explains to him that all he needs to do is merely turn the hour hand on the wizards' watch back three times, while chanting the spell. The spell will be broken, and the wizards will disappear. This should be done before sunset, but after this it will be impossible to remove the spell. Petya learns from the cuckoo that two girls and one boy have also been turned into old people, and if Petya turns the arrow without their presence, he will turn into a boy, but they will never return to their proper ages. Petya decides to first find the children, and then break the spell.

While the wizards are making dirty tricks, Petya and Druzhok look for and find the transformed children. The wizards realize that their spell is over and hurry home, trying to overtake the old men and hide the clock. A pursuit commences. All arrive almost simultaneously to the house of magicians. But Petya and the other enchanted children remove the spell and become children again, and the wizards disappear, and they all lived happily ever after.

The film plot is harder than the book (book is even shorter that The Nutcracker and the Mouse King and has only 3 mages/children) and short film.

== Cast ==
=== Leading roles ===
- Grigory Plotkin – Petya Zubov, a pupil of the 3rd grade "B" (voiced by Maria Vinogradova)
- Vera Volkova – Marusya Morozova
- Lydia Konstantinova – Nadia
- Mikhail Kulaev – Vasya
- Oleg Anofriyev – old Petya
- Lyudmila Shagalova – old Marousia
- Rina Zelyonaya – old Nadia
- Savely Kramarov – old Vasya

=== Evil Wizards ===
- Sergey Martinson – Prokofy Prokofievich
- Georgy Vitsin – Andrey Andreevich
- Irina Murzaeva – Anna Ivanovna
- Valentina Telegina – Avdotya Petrovna
- Evgeny Sokolov – Prokofy Prokofievich after aging in reverse
- Sergey Karponosov – Andrei Andreevich after aging in reverse
- Zinaida Kukushkina – Anna Ivanovna after aging in reverse
- Tatyana Dontsenko – Avdotya Petrovna after aging in reverse

=== Supporting roles ===
- Yury Chekulaev – truck driver
- Vadim Grachyov – Maslyuchenko, police sergeant
- Yevgeny Morgunov – owner of "Moskvich"
- Grigory Shpigel – first aid doctor / apple buyer in a hat
- Eva Sinelnikova – cuckoo (voice)

=== Episodic roles ===
- Nina Grebeshkova – Marya Sergeevna, teacher of the 3rd grade "B"
- Margarita Zharova – a pie seller
- Muse of Krepkogorskaya – mother of Petya
- Alexandra Panova is an old woman with a string bag
- V. Ryabtseva – head of the department in the magazine "Murzilka"
- Zoya Fyodorova – aunt Natasha, cloakroom attendant at the school
- Zoya Vasilkova – Lisa, the saleswoman of apples (in credits as "Z. Chekulaev")
- Sergei Romodanov – grandfather with a newspaper on a bench
- Ivan Ryzhov – Petrovich, foreman at the construction site
- Nikolay Yudin – fisherman
- Yan Yanakiev – Ivan Gurgenovich, Petya's neighbor (in credits as "K. Yanakiev")
- Marina Kuznetsova – Zina Kutiapina, the girl at the blackboard
- Yevgeny Eliseev – Kolya Makarov, Petya's classmate
