= Raposo Tavares (district of São Paulo) =

District of São Paulo, Brazil

Coordinates: 23°35′30″S 46°46′53″W

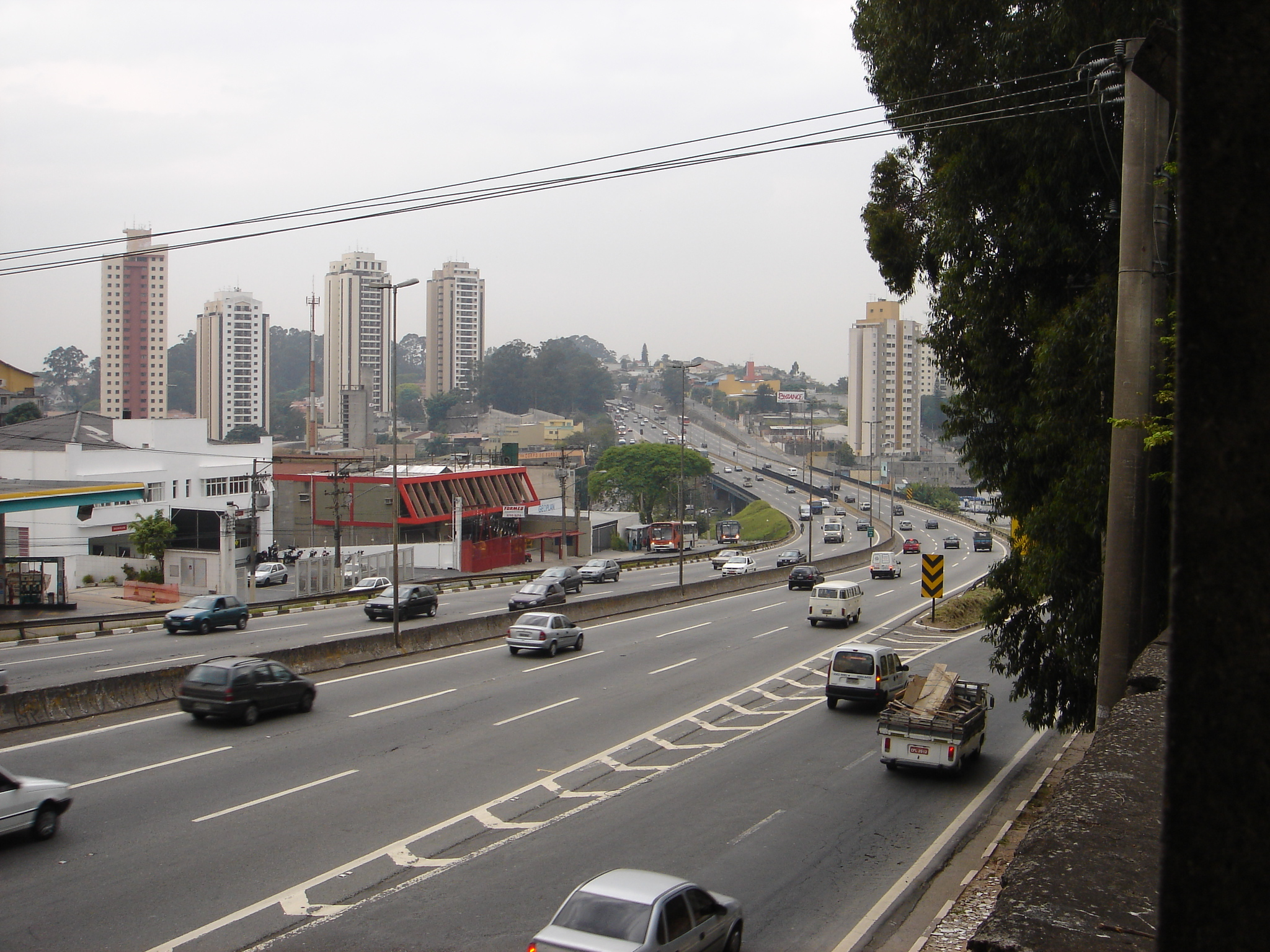

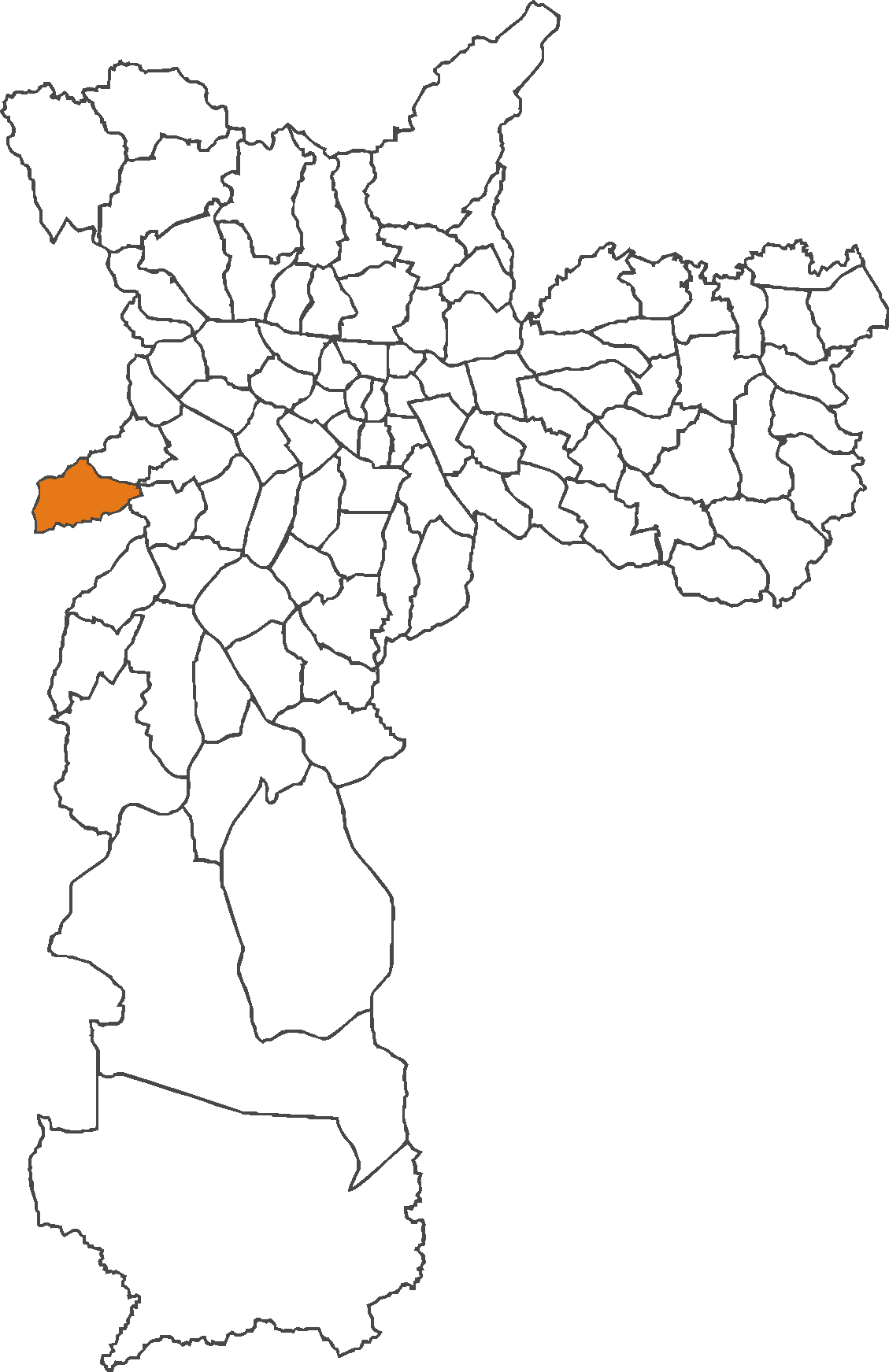
- The location of Raposo Tavares district in São Paulo
- Country: Brazil
- State: São Paulo
- City: São Paulo

Government
  - Type: Subprefecture
  - Subprefect: Daniel Barbosa Rodrigueiro

Area
  - Total: 12.6 km^{2} (4.9 sq mi)

Population (2000)
  - Total: 91.204
  - Density: 7.238/km^{2} (18.75/sq mi)
- HDI: 0.819 –high
- Website: Subprefecture of Butantã

Raposo Tavares is a district in the city of São Paulo, Brazil.

The district of Raposo Tavares belongs to the Sub-prefecture of Butantã, and is crossed by the highway with the same name. It borders the districts of Rio Pequeno and Vila Sônia. The district is undergoing rapid real estate expansion.
