= Cotia =

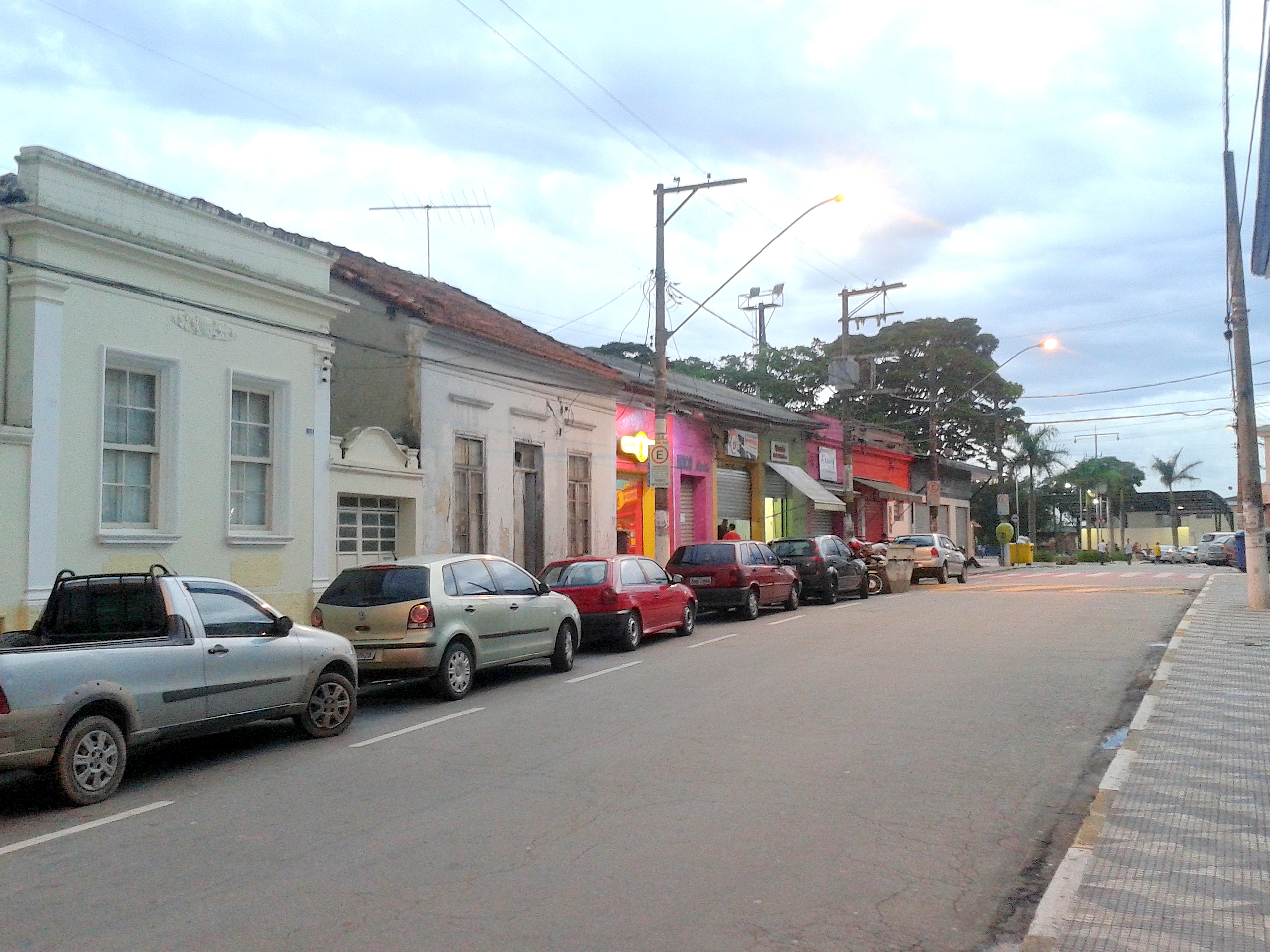
- View of the historic center of Cotia

- Flag Coat of arms

- Location in the state of São Paulo and Brazil

- Location within Brazil
- Coordinates: 23°36′15″S 46°55′10″W
- Country: Brazil
- Region: Southeast
- State: São Paulo
- Founded: April 2, 1856

Government
  - Mayor: Welington Aparecido Alfredo (PDT)

Area
  - Total: 323.99 km^{2} (125.09 sq mi)
- Elevation: 853 m (2,799 ft)

Population (2022)
  - Total: 274,413
  - Estimate (2025): 289,493
  - Density: 846.98/km^{2} (2,193.7/sq mi)
- Time zone: UTC-3 (UTC-3)
  - Summer (DST): UTC-2 (UTC-2)
- Website: Prefeitura Municipal de Cotia

Cotia is a municipality in the state of São Paulo in Brazil. It is part of the Metropolitan Region of São Paulo. The population is 274.413 (2022 est.) in an area of 323.99 km^{2}. The city is at an elevation of 853 m. Cotia is linked with the Rodovia Raposo Tavares highway.

The municipality is made up of the headquarters and the district of Caucaia do Alto, with its former districts of Jandira, Itapevi and Vargem Grande Paulista (originally called Raposo Tavares) having been split off to form new municipalities.

== History ==
Cotia was founded in 1580, and was an active village during the "bandeiras" expeditions. In 1626, Raposo Tavares and his companions arrived in the city. The "Sítio do Mandú" and "Sítio do Padre Inácio" (Mandu's Ranch and Priest Inácio's Ranch) were some of the first rural houses to be built there. Nowadays, they are preserved by the "Instituto Brasileiro de Patrimônio Cultural". Cotia was declared an independent municipality on April 2, 1856. According to the 1980 demographic census, the city had a population of over 62 thousand people.

== Geography ==
The city is located west of São Paulo, and has a terrain made of valleys and mountains, reaching a maximum elevation of 1,074 meters above sea level

The city has the Cotia River as its main river.

The city has a densely populated urban area, but the less developed areas to the west attract people interested in ecotourism. The only naturally occurring case of Brazilian hemorrhagic fever took place here.

== Demography ==
Historical population (municipality)
Year	Population	%±
1920	9,340
1940	11,387	21.9%
1950	18,487	62.4%
1960	17,906	−3.1%
1970	30,924	72.7%
1980	62,948	103.6%
1991	107,453	70.7%
2000	148,987	38.7%
2010	201,150	35.0%
2022	274,413	36.4%

== Economy ==
The city's economy is quite diverse, with the industrial and agricultural sectors standing out.

In the industrial sector located along the Raposo Tavares Highway and its surroundings, the most important products are electrical materials, chemicals, ceramics, toys, textiles, explosives, food, wine, brandy and agricultural machinery.

In agriculture, the most notable are potatoes, tomatoes, corn, beans, garlic and various fruits, most of which come from Caucaia do Alto. Poultry farming is also developed in the municipality.

In 2014, the municipality had 1,200 licensed companies (micro, small, medium and service providers) and, by the first quarter of 2015, it had 6,186 individual microentrepreneurs.

== Media ==
In telecommunications, the city was served by Telecomunicações de São Paulo. In July 1998, this company was acquired by Telefónica, which adopted the Vivo brand in 2012. The company is currently an operator of cell phones, fixed lines, internet (fiber optics/4G) and television (satellite and cable).

== Religion ==
Christianity is present in the city as follows:

=== Catholic Church ===
The Catholic church in the municipality is part of the Diocese of Osasco.

=== Protestant Church ===
The most diverse evangelical beliefs are present in the city, mainly Pentecostal, including the Assemblies of God in Brazil (the largest evangelical church in the country), Christian Congregation in Brazil, among others. These denominations are growing more and more throughout Brazil.

== See also ==
- Granja Viana, a district of Cotia
- List of municipalities in São Paulo
