= Sofiya Perovskaya (film) =

1967 Soviet film directed by Lev Arnshtam

- Original Russian film poster
- Directed by: Lev Arnshtam
- Written by: Lev Arnshtam; Yevgeni Gabrilovich
- Starring: Alexandra Nazarova
- Cinematography: Yu-Lan Chen; Aleksandr Shelenkov
- Music by: Dmitri Shostakovich
- Production company: Mosfilm
- Release date: 1967
- Running time: 114 minutes
- Country: Soviet Union
- Language: Russian

Sofiya Perovskaya (Russian: Софья Перовская) is a 1967 Soviet biopic film directed by Lev Arnshtam. The film is based on the life of Sofiya Perovskaya, member of Narodnaya Volya, executed for taking part in planning the successful assassination of Alexander II of Russia.

== Plot ==
The film follows the life of Sofya Perovskaya, a young noblewoman and the daughter of the Governor-General of Saint Petersburg, who becomes deeply inspired by revolutionary ideals. Unable to find understanding among her family, she leaves home and joins the populist "Going to the People" movement. Working as a midwife, she witnesses the harsh realities of peasant life, their ignorance, and submission. Her revolutionary activities lead to her arrest during a childbirth session, but she escapes custody by boarding a passing train. Perovskaya develops a deep romantic bond with the young revolutionary Andrei Zhelyabov, who confesses his love for her, and together they commit fully to the cause. As members of Narodnaya Volya ("People's Will"), they embrace revolutionary terrorism and orchestrate a plot to assassinate Tsar Alexander II. Even after Zhelyabov's arrest, Perovskaya takes charge, leading the group to successfully carry out the assassination.

During the attack, the first bomb, thrown by Rysakov, damages the tsar's carriage, while the second, thrown by Grinevitsky, kills both the tsar and Grinevitsky himself. In the aftermath, Perovskaya is arrested and maintains a dignified defiance during interrogations, declaring, "I executed not a man, but despotism." She identifies Grinevitsky when his head is brought to her for recognition and informs the court of fellow revolutionary Gesya Gelfman’s pregnancy, sparing Gelfman from a death sentence. At the trial, Zhelyabov delivers a powerful revolutionary speech, and Perovskaya, steadfast, refuses to request clemency. On the day of the execution, the prisoners, dressed in black and labeled "tsar-killers," are led to the scaffold, where five coffins await.

== Cast ==
- Alexandra Nazarova as Sofiya Perovskaya
- Viktor Tarasov as Andrei Zhelyabov
- Boris Khmelnitsky as Nikolai Kibalchich
- Georgi Taratorkin as Ignaty Grinevitsky
- Vladislav Strzhelchik as Alexander II of Russia
- Yefim Kopelyan as Mikhail Loris-Melikov
