= Alexandra Nazarova (actress) =

Soviet actress (1940-2019)

- Alexandra Nazarova by Vasily Malyshev
- Born: Alexandra Ivanovna Nazarova; 17 July 1940; Leningrad, RSFSR, Soviet Union
- Died: 20 August 2019 (aged 79); Moscow, Russia
- Occupation: Actress
- Years active: 1946–2019

Alexandra Ivanovna Nazarova (Russian: Алекса́ндра Ива́новна Наза́рова; 17 July 1940, Leningrad, USSR – 20 August 2019, Moscow, Russia) was a Soviet and Russian film and theater actress. In 2001, she was honoured as the People's Artist of Russia.

== Selected filmography ==
- But What If This Is Love (1961) as Nadya
- Beloved (1965) as Ira Yegorova
- Sofiya Perovskaya (1967) as Sofiya Perovskaya
- Air Crew (1980) as passenger
- Love with Privileges (1989) as Antonina Petrovna
- Trifles of Life (1992) as teacher
- Brigada (2002) as Olga's Granny
- Muhtar's Return (2003) as Schmidt
- Night Watch (2004) as Svetlana's mother
- My Fair Nanny (2004–2008) as Nadezhda Mihailovna
- Lucky Trouble (2011) as Nadya's Granny
- Brief Guide To A Happy Life (2012) as Bella
- Moms (2012) as neighbor
- Leningrad 46 (2014) as Serova
- Yolki 1914 (2014) as Maria Afanasyevna
