= But What If This Is Love =

1961 film

- Russian poster
- Russian: А если это любовь?
- Directed by: Yuli Raizman
- Written by: Iosif Olshansky; Nina Rudneva; Yuli Raizman
- Produced by: Jozef Rogozovsky
- Starring: Zhanna Prokhorenko; Igor Pushkaryov; Alexandra Nazarova; Nina Shorina; Nadezhda Fedosova
- Cinematography: Aleksandr Kharitonov
- Edited by: Klavdiya Moskvina
- Music by: Rodion Shchedrin
- Production company: Mosfilm
- Release date: 1961
- Running time: 102 min.
- Country: Soviet Union
- Language: Russian

But What If This Is Love (Russian: А если это любовь?, romanized: A esli eto lyubov?) is a 1961 Soviet teen drama film directed by Yuli Raizman.

== Plot ==
A teacher in class takes a letter from a pupil who has found it on the floor. Being of very strict morals, the teacher first carries the letter to the headmistress, and then instructs one of the pupils in the class to find out who wrote it. In the course of subsequent events, it is discovered that the letter was written by Boris Ramzin, to his classmate and deskmate Ksenia Zavyalova. Frightened by this revelation, Ksenia does not dare to go to school the next day. Seeing her indecision and confusion, Boris offers to skip classes and go to the forest together. In the forest, they get caught in the rain and find shelter in a dilapidated church. There, for the first time, they talk about their feelings aloud, because previously only correspondence was conducted. Meanwhile, Ksenia is summoned home: she hasn't come back from school on time, and her younger sister publicly announced her friend saw Ksenia leaving for the forest in the company of a boy. Ksenia's mother is infuriated, and when Ksenia returns home, she slaps her in the face. The next day, the lovers are waiting to have an explanation in the director's office. As a result of all these events, Ksenia closes in on herself. She is afraid to leave the house, her relationships grow suspect, and everyone around her seems to be mocking her. Boris shows courage and is not afraid of ridicule, because love is not a crime. Classmates of children are understanding, but teachers and other adults differ in their views: some see in their relations a violation of decency and undermining of "moral foundations", some — a wonderful feeling in which should not be interfered with, especially so unceremoniously. Ksenia's mother, who has repented for her behavior, makes it clear to her daughter that men have "one thing on their mind" and therefore she should not believe Boris. Ksenia is torn by contradictions: she reaches out to Boris and simultaneously agrees that he should leave. Driven to desperation, she tries to poison herself, which classmates learn from one of the students in a German lesson. In the final episode, the characters of the film meet a few months later. Ksenia was in the hospital, and Boris was leaving with his father on an expedition. Boris still loves the girl, but her feelings seem to be undermined as a result of the emotional trauma experienced. Ksenia informs Boris that she will go to study in Novosibirsk. Boris offers to go with her, but Ksenia's reaction is uncertain. Boris looks after the retreating girl.

== Cast ==
- Zhanna Prokhorenko as Ksenia
- Igor Pushkaryov as Boris
- Alexandra Nazarova as Nadya
- Nina Shorina as Rita
- Nadezhda Fedosova as Tatyana, Ksenya's mother
- Evgeny Zharikov as Sergei
- Andrei Mironov as Pyotr
- Viktor Khokhryakov as Pavel Afanasyevich, Boris's father

== Release ==
22.6 million Soviet viewers watched the Raizman's film. This is the 768th place in the history of film distribution in the USSR.
