= Beloved (1965 film) =

- Russian: Любимая
- Directed by: Richard Viktorov
- Written by: Oleg Stukalov
- Starring: Alexandra Nazarova; Vitali Solomin; Igor Dobrolyubov; Svetlana Druzhinina; Vyacheslav Brovkin; Boris Platonov; Yelena Maksimova
- Cinematography: Yury Marukhin
- Music by: Yevgeniy Glebov
- Production company: Belarusfilm
- Release date: 1965
- Running time: 84 min.
- Country: Soviet Union
- Language: Russian

Beloved (Russian: Любимая, romanized: Lyubimaya) is a 1965 Soviet teen romance film directed by Richard Viktorov. Screen adaptation of Nikolai Pogodin's novel Amber Necklace.

The film tells about a girl named Ira, who planned to go to college, but after meeting the builder she decided that she would work at a construction site, where she began to conflict with colleagues who did not like her personal qualities.

== Plot ==
The story follows Ira Yegorova, an orphan living with her uncle Ivan Yegorovich and his wife Nina Petrovna. During a television program about high school graduates, Ira meets Rostik, a TV reporter, through her teacher. Shortly after, she encounters Volodya Levadov, a young construction worker, by chance. Volodya lives with his foreman Blyakhin and has a complicated relationship with Blyakhin's niece, Sofia. As Ira and Rostik discuss life and career choices, her family moves to a new apartment, and Volodya coincidentally crosses paths with Ira and Rostik there. Despite her initial hesitation, Ira decides to go out with Volodya, leading her to visit his construction site, where she requests a job. She becomes a painter in Blyakhin's team, but their growing closeness is tested by Volodya’s carefree attitude and drinking habits. Tensions rise when Volodya visits the Yegorovs and clashes with Rostik over his intentions with Ira.

As Ira faces challenges at work, including Blyakhin’s demands for kickbacks, she accuses him of corruption, though he denies responsibility. At her uncle’s summer house, Ira shares her frustrations, leading to a heated argument that results in their expulsion. She and Volodya spend the night in the forest, encountering unexpected travelers and reflecting on their lives. The next day, Volodya confronts Sofia and Blyakhin, accusing them of narrow-mindedness, before leaving them for good. Misunderstandings arise when Ira hears rumors about Volodya and Sofia from her coworkers, leading to accusations of dishonesty. Heartbroken, Ira accepts Rostik's invitation to his summer house, but his advances prompt her to flee. On her way back to the city, she spots Volodya sitting by the roadside after his car breaks down while trying to find her. She stops her ride and walks toward him, suggesting a possible reconciliation.

== Cast ==
- Alexandra Nazarova as Ira Yegorova
- Vitali Solomin as Volodya Levadov
- Igor Dobrolyubov as Rostik
- Svetlana Druzhinina as Sofya
- Vyacheslav Brovkin as Dementiy Pavlovich Blyakhin (as V. Brovkin)
- Boris Platonov as Ivan Yegorovich
- Yelena Maksimova as Nina Petrovna
- Aleksey Baranovsky in a bit part
- Anna Dubrovina as Ksyusha
- Roman Filippov as Loader
- Zara Dolukhanova as singer
