= Aleksandr Ptushko =

Soviet animation and fantasy film director

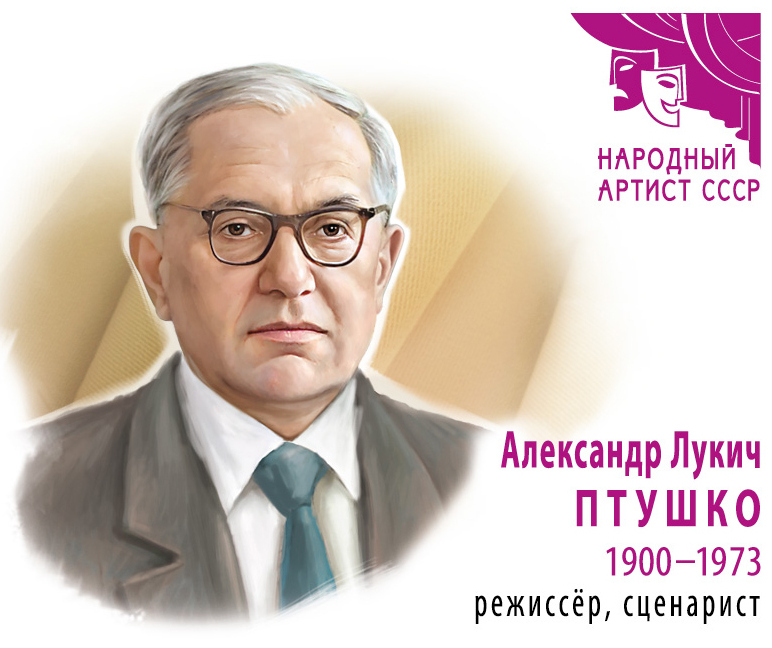
- Ptushko on a 2025 postcard of Russia
- Born: Aleksandr Lukich Ptushkin; 19 April [O.S. 6 April] 1900; Luhansk, Slavyanoserbsk uezd, Yekaterinoslav Governorate, Russian Empire
- Died: 6 March 1973 (aged 72); Moscow, Russian SFSR, Soviet Union
- Occupations: Film and animation director, animator, screenwriter, pedagogue
- Years active: 1927–1972

Aleksandr Lukich Ptushko (Russian: Александр Лукич Птушко, 19 April [O.S. 6 April] 1900 – 6 March 1973) was a Soviet animation and fantasy film director, and a People's Artist of the USSR (1969). Ptushko is frequently (and somewhat misleadingly) referred to as "the Soviet Walt Disney," because of his prominent early role in animation in the Soviet Union, though a more accurate comparison would be to Willis H. O'Brien or Ray Harryhausen. Some critics, such as Tim Lucas and Alan Upchurch, have also compared Ptushko to Italian filmmaker Mario Bava, who made fantasy and horror films with similarities to Ptushko's work and made similarly innovative use of color cinematography and special effects. He began his film career as a director and animator of stop motion short films, and became a director of feature-length films combining live action, stop motion, creative special effects, and Russian mythology. Along the way he would be responsible for a number of firsts in Russian film history (including the first feature-length animated film, and the first film in color), and would make several extremely popular and internationally praised films full of visual flair and spectacle.

== Career in film ==
=== Puppet animation era ===
Born as Aleksandr Lukich Ptushkin into a peasant family of Luka Artemyevich Ptushkin and Natalya Semyonovna Ptushkina. He studied in the realschule, then worked as an actor and decorator at the local theater. In 1923 he enrolled into the Plekhanov Russian University of Economics which he finished in 1926.

Aleksandr Ptushko began his film career in 1927 by gaining employment with Moscow's Mosfilm studio. He began as a maker of puppets for stop motion animated short films made by other directors, and rapidly became a director of his own series of silent puppet films featuring a character called Bratishkin. From 1928 to 1932, Ptushko designed and directed several of these "Bratishkin shorts." During these years, Ptushko experimented with various animation techniques, including the combination of puppets and live action in the same frame, and became well known for his skills in cinematic effects work. Virtually all of these short films are now lost.

In 1933, Ptushko, along with the animation crew he had assembled over the years, began work on his first feature film entitled The New Gulliver. Written and directed by Ptushko, The New Gulliver was one of the world's first feature length animated films, and was also one of the first feature-length films to combine stop motion animation with live-action footage. (Many claim that it was the first to do this, but Willis H. O'Brien had made The Lost World in 1925 and King Kong in 1933. The New Gulliver was, however, far more complex, as it featured 3,000 different puppets.) The story, a Communist re-telling of Gulliver's Travels, is about a young boy who dreams of himself as a version of Gulliver who has landed in Lilliput suffering under capitalist inequality and exploitation. The New Gulliver was released in 1935 to widespread acclaim and earned Ptushko a special prize at the International Cinema Festival in Milan.

After the success of The New Gulliver, Ptushko was allowed by Mosfilm to set up his own department, which became known as "the Ptushko Collective," for the making of stop motion animated films. This group of filmmakers would produce another fourteen animated shorts from 1936 to 1938. The direction of these shorts was rarely handled by Ptushko, though he would always act as the artistic supervisor for the group. These shorts were also frequently based on folktales and fairy-tales, a genre which was to become the source of Ptushko's greatest success. He personally directed two of them: an adaptation of The Tale of the Fisherman and the Fish fairy tale (1937) and Merry Musicians (1938). Both films were made in full color utilizing the newly invented three-color method by the Russian cinematographer Pavel Mershin.

In 1938, Ptushko began work on The Golden Key, another feature-length film combining stop motion animation with live action. An adaptation of The Golden Key, or the Adventures of Buratino fairy tale by Aleksey Nikolayevich Tolstoy, which, at the same time, was a retelling of the Pinocchio story, it predated the Disney version by two years. The film was also highly successful in the Soviet Union, and did achieve limited released outside the country. Despite its success, The Golden Key was to be Ptushko's last foray into animation.

During World War II, most of Moscow's film community, including Aleksandr Ptushko, were evacuated to Alma-Ata in Kazakhstan. He continued working in special effects, but would not direct another film until the end of the war.

=== Mythological epic era ===
At the end of World War II, Ptushko returned to Moscow and created his first feature-length folktale adaptation, The Stone Flower using the three-color Agfa film stock which had been seized in Germany. It was a more progressive and less complex method of shooting a color film than the one by Pavel Mershin, and the film apparently won a "special prize for the use of color" at the first Cannes Film Festival in 1946. With its plotline featuring a focus on character over effects and the use of mythology as a primary source, The Stone Flower set the tone for the next twelve years of Ptushko's career.

He followed The Stone Flower with Sadko (the film, which was heavily recut and retitled The Magic Voyage of Sinbad for American release, is an adaptation of a Russian bylina [epic tale] with no connection to Sinbad), Ilya Muromets (retitled The Sword and the Dragon for American release), and Sampo (an adaptation of the Finnish national epic Kalevala retitled The Day the Earth Froze for American release). Each film in the sequence was a theatrical retelling of epic mythology, and each was extremely visually ambitious. Sadko won the "Silver Lion" award at the Venice Film Festival in 1953. Ilya Muromets was another of Ptushko's famous 'firsts' in Soviet cinema, being the first Soviet film to be made using widescreen photography and stereo sound. Ilya Muromets is also widely claimed to hold the record for most people and horses ever to be used in a film (the IMDB lists the tagline for the film as: "A cast of 106,000! 11,000 Horses!").

=== Late career ===
After Sampo, Ptushko briefly abandoned epic fantasy for more realistic scripts. His first work in this vein was Scarlet Sails, a romantic adventure story set in the late 19th century. It retained much of the visual power of Ptushko's previous films, but greatly reduced the fantastical elements and the amount of special effects whilst focusing on character interaction and development to an extent not seen since The Stone Flower. Following Scarlet Sails, Ptushko made A Tale of Time Lost, a story about children whose youth is stolen by elderly mages, reintroducing a fantastical element. Uniquely for Ptushko, the film featured a modern-day, real world Moscow setting.

In 1966 Ptushko returned to the genre of epic fantasy, creating The Tale of Tsar Saltan. In 1968 he began work on the largest film project of his career Ruslan and Ludmila, which was also to prove his last. Running for 149 minutes (split into two feature-length segments), Ruslan and Ludmila was a film adaptation of Alexander Pushkin's epic poem of the same name, and was filled with the sumptuous visuals and technical wizardry for which Ptushko had become known. The film took four years to complete, and was released in 1972.

Aleksander Ptushko died a few months after its release, aged 72. He spent his last months writing a script for The Tale of Igor's Campaign adaptation which he was going to direct despite already been seriously ill. He was survived by his daughter from the first marriage Natalia Ptushko who worked as an assistant director at Mosfilm.

== American re-edits of Ptushko's films ==
When Ptushko's films were released in the United States, they were dubbed and re-edited, and the names of most of the cast and crew members were replaced with pseudonyms. While these practices were common at the time for releases of foreign films in the United States that were aimed at a mainstream audience, these modifications also served to obscure the Russian origin of these films to improve their commercial prospects during the Cold War.

- Valiant Pictures distributed a version of Ilya Muromets in 1960 under the title The Sword and the Dragon. In this version the total running time was reduced from 95 to 83 minutes, and the stereo soundtrack was removed during the English redub. The character names were also made less 'Russian-sounding': 'Svyatogor' was changed to 'Invincor', and 'Vladimir' to 'Vanda'. The name 'Ilya Muromets' was, however, left unchanged.
- Roger Corman's Filmgroup released Sadko in 1962 under the title The Magic Voyage of Sinbad. The Filmgroup version reduced the total running time from 89 to 79 minutes, re-dubbed it into English, and the character name 'Sadko' was replaced with 'Sinbad.' Notably, the "Script Adaptor" for this version of the film was a young Francis Ford Coppola. In this opening credits of this version, the direction of the film is credited to "Alfred Posco."
- American International Pictures released a drastically shortened version of Sampo in 1964 retitled The Day the Earth Froze. The most heavily altered of the three, The Day the Earth Froze had a running time of only 67 minutes, down 24 minutes from the 91 minute runtime of the Soviet original. It was also re-dubbed into English. This film, while not having its character names altered, still had its credits heavily 'de-Russified': Ptushko was credited as "Gregg Sebelious," Andris Oshin was listed in the pressbook as 'Jon Powers' (and was described as a Finno-Swiss ski-lift attendant), and Eve Kivi was listed as 'Nina Anderson' (a half Finnish, half American beauty queen, figure skater, and stamp collector).

== Legacy ==
=== Mystery Science Theater 3000 ===
The works of Aleksandr Ptushko are now perhaps best known to native English speakers for their inclusion in the television series Mystery Science Theater 3000 (MST3K). The three re-edited films from Ptushko's epic fantasy period, The Magic Voyage of Sinbad, The Sword and the Dragon, and The Day the Earth Froze were used as fodder for the show's humorous wisecracks in episodes 422, 505, and 617, respectively. This triplet is commonly referred to as the "MST3K Russo-Finnish troika".

Though it may be considered a dubious distinction for a film to be aired as part of the Mystery Science Theater 3000 series, it is worth mentioning that the versions of Ptushko's films which were used were the heavily re-edited and dubbed versions created specifically for American release, radically different from Ptushko's originals in all but their visuals.

It is also worth noting that he has received some praise from the crew: Kevin Murphy, one of the stars of the program, has professed a love for the "breathtaking" visual style and "stunning photography and special effects" of Sampo and Sadko in multiple interviews (though he erroneously credited Alexander Rou's Jack Frost to Ptushko.) Paul Chaplin, another writer of the show, has also expressed admiration.

Sadko and Ilya Muromets have since been fully restored and released on DVD in their original Russian versions by RusCiCo (with English subtitles).

== Filmography ==
Original Russian titles noted where possible; see discussion page for source information.

=== Feature films directed ===
- The New Gulliver (1935) – director, script writer
- The Golden Key (1939) – director, producer
- The Stone Flower (1946) – director, production designer
- Sadko (1952) – director
- Ilya Muromets (1956) – director
- Sampo (1959) – director
- Scarlet Sails (1961) – director
- Tale About the Lost Time (1964) – director
- The Tale of Tsar Saltan (1966) – director, script writer
- Ruslan and Ludmila (1972) – director, script writer

=== Other feature film work ===
- Aerograd (1935) – director of combination shots
- The Children of Captain Grant (1936) – cinematographer and director of combination shots
- Batyri Stepey (Batyri of the Steppes, 1942) – special effects director
- Paren iz nashego goroda (A Lad From Our Town, 1942) – special effects production director
- Sekretar raykoma (Regional Party Secretary, 1942) – special effects production director
- Front (1943) – special effects
- Nebo Moskvy (The Skies of Moscow, 1944) – director of combination shots
- Zoya (1944) – special effects
- Nashe Serdtse (Our Heart, 1946) – special effects
- Three Encounters (1948) – co-director
- My Friend, Kolka! (1961) – artistic director
- Beat Up, Drum! (1962) – artistic director
- Fuse#3 (1962) – script writer
- Viy (1967) – script writer, artistic director, director of combination shots

=== Short films ===
- Propavshaya Gramota (The Missing Certificate, 1927) – animator
- Sluchay na stadione (An Incident at the Stadium, 1928) – director, designer
- Shifrovanny dokument (The Coded Document, 1928) – director, script writer, animator
- Sto priklyucheni (One Hundred Adventures, 1929) – director, script writer, animator
- Kino v derevnyu! (Cinema to the Countryside!, 1930) – director, designer
- Krepi oboronu (Strengthen Our Defenses, 1930) – director, script writer, animator
- Vlastelin byta (The Lord of Family Life, 1932) – director, script writer, animator
- Repka (The Little Turnip, 1936) – script writer, artistic supervisor
- Volk i Zhuravl (1936) – artistic supervisor
- Lisa i Vinograd (1936) – artistic supervisor
- Rodina Zovet (The Motherland Calls, 1936) – artistic supervisor
- Vesyolye muzykanty (The Merry Musicians, 1937) – director, script writer
- Skazka o rybake i rybke (The Tale of the Fisherman and the Fish, 1937) – director, script writer, animator
- Zaveshchaniye (The Testament, 1937) – script writer
- Lisa i Volk (The Fox and the Wolf, 1937) – script writer, artistic supervisor
- Malenky-Udalenky (The Mighty Mite, 1938) – script writer
- Pyos i kot (The Dog and the Cat, 1938) – script writer

== Awards and honors ==
- Honored Artist of the RSFSR (1935)
- Order of the Badge of Honour (1940)
- Two Orders of the Red Banner of Labour (one in 1944)
- Stalin Prize, 1st class (1947) – for the film The Stone Flower (1946)
- People's Artist of the RSFSR (1957)
- People's Artist of the USSR (1969)

== See also ==
- Alexander Rou
- Ivan Ivanov-Vano
- Lev Atamanov
