= Yu-Lan Chen =

Chinese-born Russian cinematographer

- Иола́нда Евге́ньевна Чен; Chinese: 陈幼兰
- Born: 18 October 1913; Republic of China
- Died: 5 February 2006 (aged 92)
- Resting place: Kuntsevo Cemetery, Moscow
- Education: State Institute of Cinematography
- Occupation: Cinematographer
- Notable work: War and Peace
- Movement: Socialist realism
- Spouse: Alexander Vladimirovich Shelenkov
- Father: Eugene Chen

Yu-Lan Chen or Yolanda Chen (Russian: Иола́нда Евге́ньевна Чен, romanized: Yolanda Evgenievna Chen; Chinese: 陈幼兰; Cyrillized Chinese: Чэнь Юлань) (Note: Also variously: Iolanda Chen, Yu-lan Iolanda Chen, Yolanda Yevgenyevna Chen, Iolanda Yevgenyevna Chen, Чен Ю Лан, and Иоланда Чен.) (18 October 1913 – 5 February 2006) was a cinematographer, born in the Republic of China and active in the Soviet Union in the field of Soviet realism.

== Biography ==
Chen was a daughter of the revolutionary, diplomat and foreign minister Eugene Chen.

In 1927, after the Shanghai Massacre, she fled China with her father, sister and brothers, reaching Moscow via Vladivostok. She graduated from the cinematography department of the State Institute of Cinematography in 1935 and after that date worked as an assistant cameraman at Mezhrabpomfilm's studios. From 1936 onwards she worked at Soyuzdetfilm. From 1945, she worked as a cameraperson at Mosfilm studios. She is buried at the Kuntsevo Cemetery in Moscow.

== Filmography ==
All collaborations were with her husband, cameraman Alexander Vladimirovich Shelenkov:

- 1946 — The Great Glinka, as Director of Photography (DOP)
- 1947 — The Legend of Neistov; also known as The Tale of the "Neistoviy", as DOP
- 1949 — Rainis, as DOP
- 1950 — Far From Moscow, as DOP
- 1953 — Admiral Ushakov; Attack from the Sea, both as DOP
- 1955 — Romeo and Juliet
- 1957 — A Lesson in History, as DOP
- 1958 — The Communist, as DOP
- 1960 — Five Days, Five Nights, as DOP
- 1965 — The Secret of Success
- 1966 — Tunelul; also known as The Tunnel, as DOP
- 1967 — Sofiya Perovskaya, as DOP
- 1968 — War and Peace, parts I, II, and IV, as DOP
- 1970 — Songs of the Sea
- 1971 — At Our Factory
- 1973 — There Lived Three Bachelors, as DOP
- 1975 — Jarosław Dąbrowski
