= The Stone Flower (1946 film) =

1946 film

- Theatrical release poster
- Directed by: Aleksandr Ptushko
- Written by: Pavel Bazhov; Ivan Keller
- Starring: Vladimir Druzhnikov
- Cinematography: Fyodor Provorov
- Music by: Lev Shvarts
- Production company: Mosfilm
- Release date: 28 April 1946
- Running time: 83 minutes
- Country: Soviet Union
- Language: Russian

The Stone Flower (Russian: Каменный цветок, romanized: Kamennyy tsvetok) is a 1946 Soviet fantasy film directed by Aleksandr Ptushko. It is an adaptation of Pavel Bazhov's story of the same name, in turn based on Ural region Russian folklore. It also incorporates plot elements from the stories "The Mistress of the Copper Mountain" and "The Master Craftsman".

The Stone Flower was theatrically released by Mosfilm on 28 April 1946. It was the Soviet Union's first color film shot on Agfacolor negative film seized in Germany, and was entered into the 1946 Cannes Film Festival. It was a success at the box-office in the year 1946 in USSR, it was seen by 23.17 million viewers.

== Plot ==
The story is told from the point of view the old storyteller Slyshko.

The skilled gemcutter Prokopych is getting old, and the landlord's bailiff forces him to take an apprentice. Prokopych tries to teach several boys, but none of them understands "the soul of stone". Eventually he picks a young boy Danilo, who appears to be very scatterbrain and careless in everything else, but shows extreme talent in shaping gemstones and creating patterns. He quickly surpasses his old teacher, who takes a liking to him. Prokopych decides to keep him away from the craft for the time being because gemcutting can seriously damage health.

Years pass. One day the landlord summons Prokopych. He announces that he has been to France and visited a marquess, who showed him the beautifully crafted casket; the landlord started bragging that he had "a better one at home", and they made a bet that the landlord's casket would prove more beautiful. He now needs to present the casket, so he orders Prokopych to make one that should be so beautiful that "you will not be able to take your eyes of it". Prokopych works day and night, but fails to think of an original design. Danilo makes the malachite casket for him. The landlord's wife is very satisfied with his work and orders a stone cup "that would look exactly like a flower". Danilo starts working on the cup. He wants to create something outstanding to reveal "the full power of stone". Prokopych scolds him for trying too hard for no good reason, but secretly admires Danilo's determination. He believes that it is a sign of the expert craftsman. Danilo works on his flower cup for several months, paying little attention to his fiancée Katinka. After he finishes the cup, every villager admires his work, but Danilo is unhappy. He feels that there is no true "living" beauty in his malachite cup, yet he wants to collect "all the beauty of the real flower" and convey it though stone. An old craftsman warns him against walking this path, otherwise he might end up as one of the Mistress of the Copper Mountain's craftsmen. Those craftsmen understood the beauty of stone after they saw the legendary Stone Flower. However, those who saw the Flower never wanted to go back from the Mistress' domain. Katinka asks her beloved to forget about the Stone Flower, but he is tempted.

Danilo finally decides to marry Katinka. Nevertheless, at the wedding he goes back to his room, destroys his flower cup and goes to the mine. He begs the Mistress of the Copper Mountain to show him the Stone Flower. She warns him that he would never want to go back to people after seeing it, and reminds him of Katinka. He replies that he does not feel alive anyway. In the domain of the Mistress, he finally sees the Flower. He stays there, working on the new cup. Danilo is saddened by the fact that his work, albeit marvellous, will never be seen by people. He admits that he thinks about Katinka day and night, but the Mistress of the Copper Mountain claims that she is jealous and refuses to let him go. She asks him to marry her, but Danilo refuses.

Katinka never marries another, believing that Danilo is still alive. She moves in with Prokopych and takes care of the old man. He teaches her some gemcutting. Although he believes that this is not "a woman's craft", Katinka's work is good. She earns enough money to make ends meet. While searching for some good stones in the forest, Katinka meets the Mistress of the Copper Mountain and demands that she let her beloved go. Inside the mine, Katinka rejoins with Danilo. The Mistress praises Danilo for his honor and fidelity, and says that the couple passed her test. She presents a casket filled with jewellery for Katinka, and rewards Danilo by letting him remember all that he learned at her domain. Danilo and Katinka leave together.

== Cast ==
- Vladimir Druzhnikov as Danilo
- Yekaterina Derevshchikova as Katinka, a village girl and Danilo's romantic interest
- Tamara Makarova as The Mistress of the Copper Mountain
- Mikhail Troyanovsky as Prokopych
- Aleksandr Kleberer as The Old Storyteller Slyshko
- Vitaly Kravchenko as Young Danilo
- Nikolai Orlov as The Old Craftsman
- Anna Petukhova as The Landlord's wife
- Nikolay Temyakov as The Landlord
- Mikhail Yanshin as Severyan the Bailiff
- Lidia Deikun as The Old Woman Vikhorika
- Serafim Zaytsev as Yefimka

== Reception and legacy ==
The film popularized a Russian catchphrase "How did that Stone Flower come out?" (Russian: "Не выходит у тебя Каменный цветок?", romanized: Ne vykhodit u tebja Kamennyj tsvetok?, lit. "Naught came of your Stone Flower?"), derived from this dialogue from the original fairy tale:

"Well, Danilo the Craftsman, so naught came of your thornapple?"
"No, naught came of it," he said.

Bazhov liked the film, mostly the actors' performances. However he said that there was "little Ural" in it, for example there was a scene where people sing "Kalinka" as if "there are no good Ural songs".

== Awards ==
- At the 1946 Cannes Film Festival, the picture received a prize for Best Color (Prix de la meilleure couleur).
- In 1947 it was awarded the Stalin Prize of I degree. (Aleksandr Ptushko, Fyodor Provorov)
