= Três Dias Sem Deus =

1945 film

- Directed by: Bárbara Virgínia
- Written by: Raul Faria da Fonseca; Gentil Marques; Fernando Teixeira
- Starring: Maria Clementina
- Cinematography: António Mendes
- Edited by: Montero Aço
- Release date: 30 August 1945
- Running time: 102 minutes
- Country: Portugal
- Language: Portuguese

Três Dias Sem Deus is a 1945 Portuguese drama film directed by Bárbara Virgínia. It was entered into the 1946 Cannes Film Festival.

== Cast ==
- Maria Clementina as Teresa, the castle's maid
- Laura Fernandes as Beatriz, the school's maid
- Jorge Gentil as Alberto, the priest
- Rosa Linda as Isabel Belforte
- Manuel Mariano as Ill boy
- Joaquim Miranda as Tadeu, the cart-driver
- João Perry as Paulo Belforte
- Casimiro Rodrigues as Januário
- Alfredo Ruas as Lídia's father
- António Sacramento as Village's doctor
- Elvira Velez as Bernarda, the village's witch
- Bárbara Virgínia as Lídia
