= Five Days, Five Nights (1960 film) =

- Directed by: Lev Arnshtam; Heinz Thiel; Anatoly Golovanov
- Written by: Lev Arnshtam; Wolfgang Ebeling
- Produced by: Otman Karayev, Adolf Fischer
- Starring: Wilhelm Koch-Hooge; Annekathrin Bürger; Erich Franz; Heinz-Dieter Knaup; Evgenia Kozireva
- Cinematography: Yu-Lan Chen; Aleksandr Shelenkov
- Edited by: Tatyana Likhacheva
- Music by: Dmitri Shostakovich
- Production companies: Mosfilm; DEFA
- Distributed by: Progress Film (GDR)
- Release dates: 28 February 1961 (USSR); 31 March 1961 (GDR)
- Running time: 106 minutes
- Countries: Soviet Union; East Germany
- Languages: Russian, German

Five Days, Five Nights (Russian: Пять дней, пять ночей, romanized: Pyat Dney, Pyat Nochei; German: Fünf Tage, Fünf Nächte) is a 1961 joint Soviet–East German film, directed by Lev Arnshtam and Heinz Thiel.

On 8 May 1945, the day of Germany's surrender at the end of World War II, exiled communist Erich Braun returns along with the Red Army to his native city of Dresden, only three months after it was devastated in aerial bombardment. He aids a group of Soviet soldiers to recover the art of the Old Masters Picture Gallery from the ruins of the Zwinger Palace. During the next five days, while searching for the collection, he encounters several of the city's residents who have also returned from the war. Although they distrust the Soviets at first, they eventually assist them to recover the pictures.

== Plot ==
On 8 May 1945, Soviet soldiers occupy Dresden as World War II comes to an end. The city lies in ruins. Communist Erich Braun returns to Dresden, while Captain Leonov searches for the missing paintings of the Dresden Gallery amidst the destruction. Leonov is referred to the artist Paul Naumann, who possesses paintings, but they are his own works depicting the city's devastation and his lost love, Katrin. Having lost his left arm in the war, Paul vows never to paint again. Leonov takes him to the gallery, where they meet museum employee Luise Rank. Initially reluctant to disclose anything, Luise recognizes Leonov's passion for art and hands him a map showing a tunnel where dozens of paintings, including Rembrandt's The Prodigal Son in the Tavern, are hidden. In the tunnel, Paul encounters Erich Braun, who reveals that Katrin was arrested alongside him and likely killed in a concentration camp for helping a Russian woman. When Erich asks Paul to create a poster calling for action, Paul refuses, rejecting violence entirely.

Dr. Nikitina, an art restorer from Moscow, arrives to assess the deteriorated paintings, damaged by humidity in the tunnel. Acting on Paul's advice, the artworks are moved to Schloss Rassnitz for preliminary restoration. When Raphael's *Sistine Madonna* is unveiled, everyone is deeply moved, even Sergeant Koslow, who had previously dismissed the importance of art amidst the city's devastation. Later, Paul witnesses a group of concentration camp survivors passing by, which stirs tension among Soviet soldiers. Leonov defends Paul, emphasizing that not all Germans bear guilt for Nazi atrocities. As the search for more missing artworks continues, the soldiers focus on Schloss Waldstein, rumored to be harboring SS officers and stolen paintings. Paul objects to violent action and leaves, heading back to Dresden. On his journey, he unexpectedly reunites with Katrin, who has survived the concentration camp. Meanwhile, the soldiers secure additional paintings from Waldstein and rescue Paul and Katrin from the roadside.

In Dresden, Katrin becomes active in aiding the city's orphans, urging Paul to join the effort, though he remains withdrawn. Among the rescued children is a blond boy whom Sergeant Koslow had greeted as "the first German" upon entering Dresden. Meanwhile, it is determined that the artworks require proper restoration in Moscow, prompting plans to transport them to the Soviet Union. Paul feels betrayed by the victors' decision. A worker discovers that the last missing paintings are hidden in the heavily mined Brigitte Shaft. Koslow and the worker enter the shaft, where Koslow defuses mines and locates the submerged paintings. Tragically, Koslow dies when an overlooked mine explodes as he retrieves a painting. The recovered paintings are brought back, and Koslow's coffin is placed among them, with Luise Rank paying tribute.

Inspired by Katrin and the orphans, Paul finally picks up his brushes to paint a poster featuring the blond boy holding a teddy bear, a gift from Koslow. The child is depicted as a symbol of hope and resilience, ensuring that Koslow and others who made sacrifices will not be forgotten.

== Cast ==
- Wilhelm Koch-Hooge as Erich Braun
- Annekathrin Bürger as Katrin
- Erich Franz as Father Baum
- Heinz-Dieter Knaup as Paul Naumann
- Evgenia Kozireva as Nikitina
- Marga Legal as Luise Ramk
- Mikhail Mayorov as General
- Vladimir Pitsek as Galkin
- Nikolai Pogodin as Rudakov
- Vsevolod Safonov as Captain Leonov
- Vsevolod Sanaev as Sergeant Kozlov
- Raimund Schelcher as farmer
- Gennadi Yukhtin as Strokov

== Production ==
The picture's plot was inspired by the recovery of the art of the Old Masters Picture Gallery by Soviet troops in 1945. The art collection was then taken to the USSR, where it was kept until being returned to the Dresden Gallery during 1960. The film was the first Soviet–East German co-production in the field of cinema.

== Reception ==
Five Days, Five Nights sold more than two million tickets in the German Democratic Republic.

The film critic of Der Spiegel described the picture as "making no claim to document history truthfully", while also quoting Walter Ulbricht, who called it "a great work of the Working Class" and a monument to Soviet–East German friendship. The Die Zeit reviewer wrote: "the film portrays the Germans quite objectively. But the Soviets? We could only wish for it. Although we well realize that could not have been as they are depicted: noble, faultless and helpful."
