= Romeo and Juliet (1955 film) =

1955 film

- Film poster
- Directed by: Lev Arnshtam; Leonid Lavrovsky
- Written by: Lev Arnshtam; Leonid Lavrovsky
- Based on: Romeo and Juliet; 1597 play by William Shakespeare
- Produced by: Pavel Danilyants
- Starring: Yuri Zhdanov; Galina Ulanova
- Cinematography: Yu-Lan Chen; Aleksandr Shelenkov
- Edited by: Tatyana Likhachyova
- Music by: Sergei Prokofiev
- Release date: 20 May 1955
- Running time: 92 minutes
- Country: Soviet Union

Romeo and Juliet (Russian: Ромео и Джульетта, translit. Romeo i Dzhulyetta) is a 1955 Soviet ballet film directed by Lev Arnshtam. The film was based on the 1940 production of Prokofiev's ballet, choreographed by Leonid Lavrovsky. It was entered into the 1955 Cannes Film Festival, where it won the Best Lyrical Film and was nominated as the Palme d'Or.

== Cast ==
- Galina Ulanova as Juliet
- Yuri Zhdanov as Romeo (as Yu. Zhdanov)
- I. Olenina as Juliet's nurse
- Aleksandr Radunsky as Lord Capulet (as A. Radunsky)
- Ye. Ilyushchenko as Lady Capulet
- Aleksey Yermolayev as Tybalt
- Sergei Koren as Mercutio (as S. Koren)
- V. Kudryashov as Benvolio
- L. Loshchilin as Friar Laurence
- Aleksandr Lapauri as Paris (as A. Lapauri)
