= Butantã (district of São Paulo) =

District of São Paulo, Brazil

Coordinates: 12°52′S 39°20′W

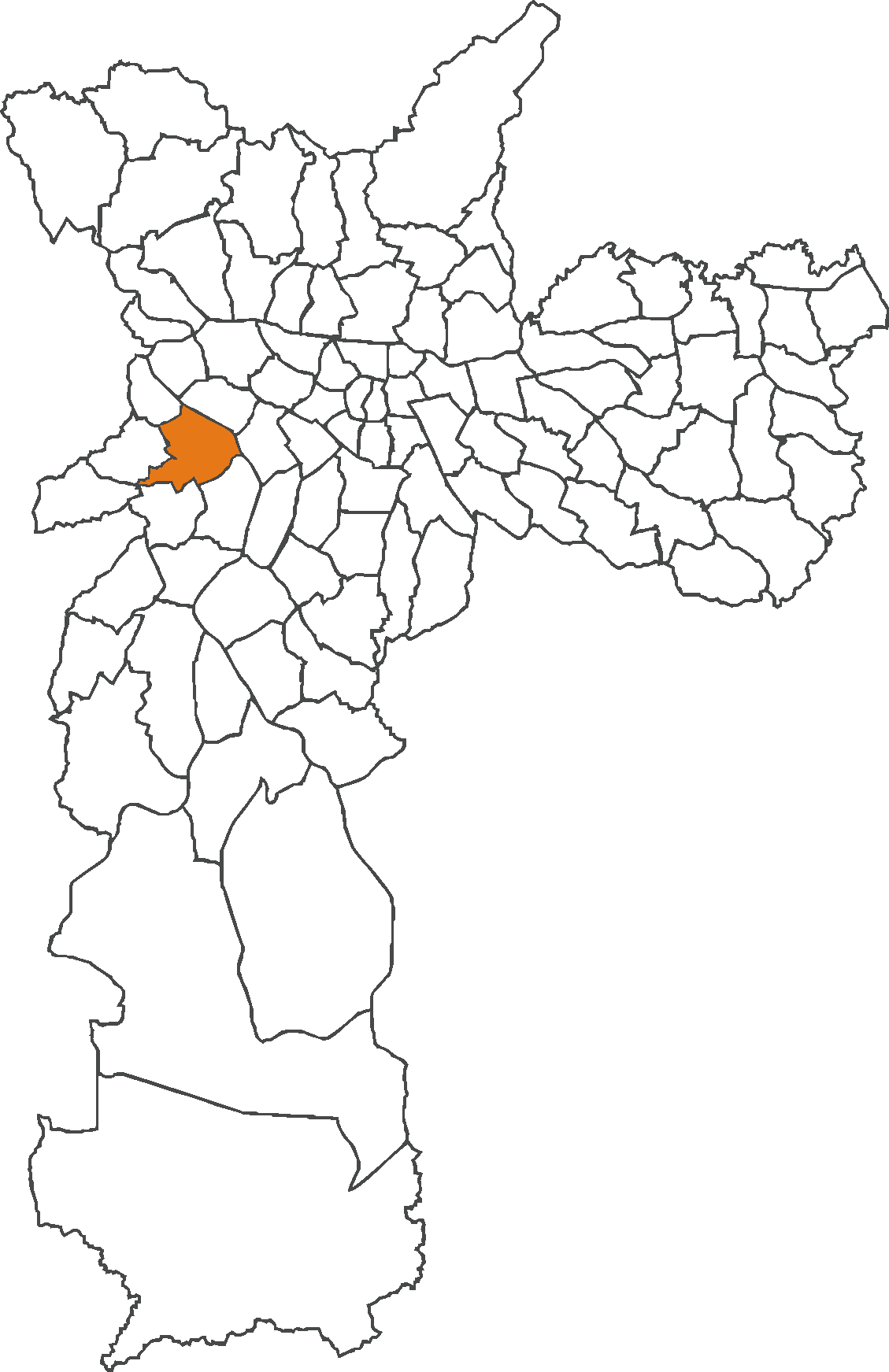
- The location of Butantã district in São Paulo

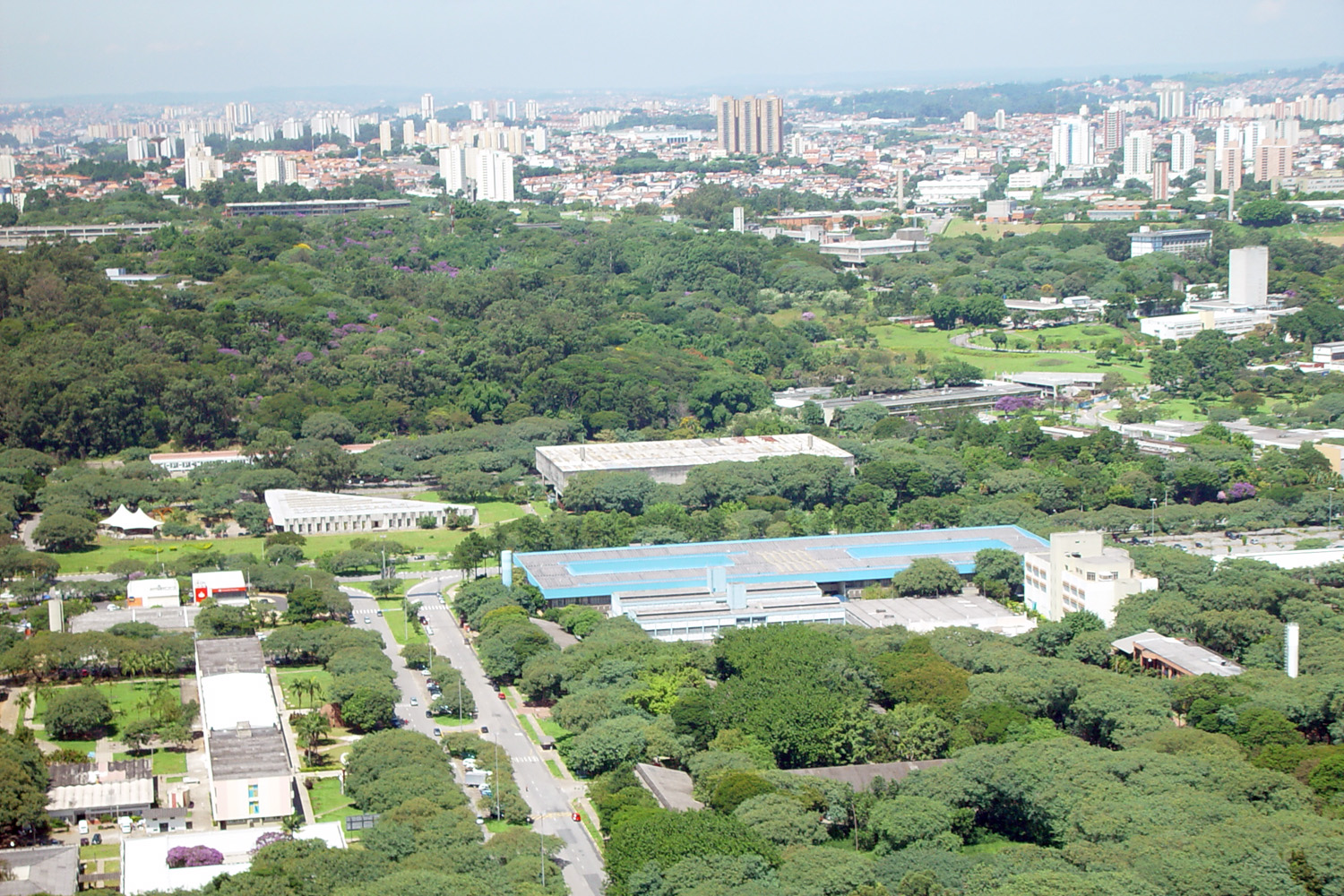
- Country: Brazil
- State: São Paulo
- City: São Paulo

Government
  - Type: Subprefecture
  - Subprefect: Daniel Barbosa Rodrigueiro

Area
  - Total: 12.5 km^{2} (4.8 sq mi)

Population (2000)
  - Total: 52.649
- HDI: 0.928 –high
- Website: Subprefecture of Butantã

Butantã (Portuguese pronunciation: [butɐ̃ˈtɐ̃], from the tupi for "crushed soil") is a district of the city of São Paulo, Brazil. It is part of the homonymous subprefecture, located on the west bank of the Pinheiros River.

The district hosts the main campus of the University of São Paulo.

The Instituto Butantan is also located in the borough.

Neighborhoods in the Butantã district: City Butantã; Vila Indiana; Jardim Rizzo; Vila Pirajussara; Butantã Residential Complex (also known as Inocoop); Jardim Christi; Jardim Ademar; Pension; Caxingui; Rolinópolis; Jardim Esmeralda; Vila Gomes; Jardim Bonfiglioli; Jardim São Gilberto; Bandeirantes City; Jardim Matarazzo; Jardim Pinheiros. All of them have a predominantly residential profile, with some commercial corridors: the avenues Vital Brasil, Corifeu de Azevedo Marques, Engenheiro Heitor Antônio Eiras Garcia, Eliseu de Almeida, Comendador Alberto Bonfiglioli and Professor Francisco Morato, as well as streets such as Alvarenga, Camargo and MMDC.

Butantã is also crossed by the initial kilometers of the Raposo Tavares highway. Other notable landmarks in the district include the University City, headquarters of the University of São Paulo, and, next to the university, the Butantan Institute. In the 2000 census, it had a population of 52,649 inhabitants. The district is served by Line 4–Yellow of the São Paulo Metro through the Butantã Station, inaugurated on March 28, 2011, and the São Paulo–Morumbi Station, inaugurated on October 27, 2018. The latter is located on the border with the Morumbi district.

== See also ==
- Sertanista House
