= Jarosław Dąbrowski (film) =

1976 film

Jaroslaw Dabrowski
- Directed by: Bohdan Poręba
- Starring: Zygmunt Malanowicz
- Cinematography: Yu-Lan Chen; Alexander Shelenkov
- Music by: Wojciech Kilar
- Release date: 1976
- Countries: Poland, Soviet Union
- Languages: Polish, Russian

Jarosław Dąbrowski is a Polish historical film directed by Bohdan Poręba about Jarosław Dąbrowski. It was released in 1976.

== Plot ==
The biographical film tells the story of Jarosław Dąbrowski, a national hero of Poland and a revolutionary in both Poland and France.

Dąbrowski was sentenced to death for his active role in the 1863 Polish uprising, a punishment later commuted to fifteen years of hard labor. Escaping from prison, he fled to France, where he became a leading figure in the Paris Commune, commanding its armed forces during the events of 1871.

Dąbrowski ultimately met his end on the barricades, solidifying his legacy as a symbol of revolutionary resistance and sacrifice.

== Cast ==
- Zygmunt Malanowicz − Jarosław Dąbrowski
- Małgorzata Potocka − Pelagia Dąbrowska, Dąbrowski's wife
- Aleksandr Kalagin − Tuchołko
- Wiktor Awdiuszko − Władisław Ozierow
- Władimir Iwaszow − Andrij Potebnia
- Stanisław Niwiński − Bronisław Szwarce
- Stefan Szmidt − Walery Wróblewski
- Józef Nowak − Bronisław Wołowski
