= Bárbara Virgínia =

Portuguese actress, radio personality and film director

- Born: Maria de Lourdes Dias Costa; 15 November 1923; Lisbon, Portugal
- Died: 7 March 2015 (aged 91); São Paulo, Brazil
- Resting place: Morumbi cemetery
- Occupations: Actress; film director; radio personality
- Website: IMDB profile

Bárbara Virgínia, born Maria de Lourdes Dias Costa (15 November 1923 – 7 March 2015), was a Portuguese actress, radio personality and film director. She changed her name in her teenage years. Bárbara studied dance, singing, piano and theater at the National Conservatory in Lisbon between 1940 and 1943. Theater was studied under Alves da Cunha, and piano was taught by Pedro de Freitas Branco. She later in 1946, became the first female Portuguese movie director, with the film Três Dias Sem Deus.

== Career ==
Bárbara Virgínia was the first woman in Portugal to ever direct a feature film (there were some women before her who directed and produced films, but mainly documentaries or short silent pictures). Her debut film was Três Dias sem Deus (Three Days without God, 1946) which she both directed and acted in. She was only 22 years at the time – the youngest female director of that period. The film premiered in Lisbon on 30 August 1946 at the Teatro do Ginásio. That same year it was presented at the first Cannes Film Festival; Bárbara being the only solo female director whose work was presented. Today only 22 minutes remains of the original 102 minutes long film, those 22 minutes are fragmented and without sound.

She also directed the documentary Aldeia dos rapazes: Orfanto St. Isabel de Albarraque (Village of the Boys: Sta. Isabel de Albarraque Orphanage).

She directed these two pieces within a strongly male dominant sector and during the dictatorship of Salazar's New State (Estado Novo) when women were expected to stay within reproductive work and not perform productive work. And it would take until after the regime fell before another woman, Margarida Cordeiro, would direct another feature film in Portugal. Still today the representation of female directors is low in Portugal, around 14% since the 1980s.

In 1952, she moved to Brazil, since she had been rejected financial support for other film projects and more control over the cinematic process in Portugal. Bárbara later stated that she had always been independent and that was the reason for censors to dismiss her. In Brazil she continued working within the culture sector as an actress in television, writing books and reciting poetry for radio, but she never again directed or starred in another film.

Her name and accomplishment was for long lost to Portuguese film history. But in the 2010s her contributions to the Portuguese cinematic heritage was to some extent acknowledged. Today there is an award in her name.

In 2015, an award was established in Portugal in her name, Prémio Bárbara Virgínia, to recognize female artists who standout within arts. Also, in 2017, Luisa Sequeira's documentary, Quem é Bárbara Virgínia? (Who is Bárbara Virgínia? 2017) portraying Bárbara Virgínia and her cinematic history premiered, the film has been praised for its cultural significance. According to Vitor Pinto of Cineuropa, in the article Who Is Bárbara Virgínia?: Restoring the memory of Portuguese cinema, it is "an essential film to restore part of the memory of Portuguese cinema.".

== Personal life ==
When Bárbara decided to move to São Paulo, Brazil in 1952, her mother accompanied her. She settled her and started a family – with husband and a daughter. She also opened a restaurant – Aqui, Portugal – where a vibrant social and artistic network used to hang around. Some of her famous guests were Edith Piaf, Tony de Matos and Amália Rodrigues. The last interview with Bárbara was in 2012 by Ana Catarina Pereira and William Pianco.

== Filmography ==
Year	Title	Role	Notes
1946	Aldeia dos rapazes: Orfanato Sta. Isabel de Albarraque	Director	
1946	Três Dias Sem Deus	Director and actress (role: Lídia)	
1946	Sonho de Amor	Actress (role: Alda)	
1946	Neve em Lisboa	Narrator	
1947	Aqui, Portugal	Actress	
