= Scuola Italiana Eugenio Montale =

Italian international school in Brazil

Location
- Rua Dr. José Gustavo Busch, 75; Morumbi; São Paulo, São Paulo (state), 05705-190; Brazil; 23°36′0″S 46°43′12″W

Information
- Established: 1982; 44 years ago
- Website: www.montale.com.br/pt/

Scuola Italiana Eugenio Montale is a private Italian international school in Morumbi, São Paulo. The school was established in 1982 and it's an UNESCO associated school.

Its educational stages are: Educação Infantil/Scuola dell´Infanzia (preschool), Ensino Fundamental I/Scuola Primaria (elementary school), Ensino Fundamental II/Scuola Sec. di I Grado (junior high school), and Ensino Médio/Liceo Scientifico (senior high school).

== See also ==
- Italian Brazilian
- Eugenio Montale
