= Zoya (1944 film) =

1944 war film by Lev Arnshtam

- Film poster
- Directed by: Lev Arnshtam
- Written by: Lev Arnshtam; Boris Chirskov
- Starring: Galina Vodyanitskaya
- Cinematography: Aleksandr Shelenkov
- Music by: Dmitri Shostakovich
- Distributed by: Soyuzdetfilm
- Release date: 1944
- Running time: 95 minutes
- Country: Soviet Union
- Language: Russian

Zoya (Russian: Зоя) is a 1944 Soviet biographical war film directed by Lev Arnshtam. Margarita Aliger’s poem with the same name which had been published in September 1942 was the inspiration of the film. It was entered into the 1946 Cannes Film Festival.

== Plot ==
The film depicts the short life of a Moscow schoolgirl Zoya Kosmodemyanskaya, who, at the beginning of the Great Patriotic War, became a partisan-infiltrator and was executed by German soldiers in November 1941 near Moscow, in the village of Petrishcheva. She was posthumously awarded the title Hero of the Soviet Union.

== Cast ==
- Galina Vodyanitskaya as Zoya Kosmodemyanskaya
- Tamara Altseva as Zoya's Teacher
- Aleksey Batalov
- Anatoli Kuznetsov as Boris Fomin
- Rostislav Plyatt as German Soldier
- Boris Podgornij as German Officer
- Vera Popova
- Boris Poslavsky as Owl
- Nikolai Ryzhov as Zoya's Father
- Yekaterina Skvortsova as Zoya as a child (as Katya Skvortsova)
- Kseniya Tarasova as Zoya's Mother
- Yekaterina Tarasova as Katya Tarasova
- Vladimir Volchek as Komsomol Secretary
