= Lev Arnshtam =

Soviet film director

- Born: 15 January 1905; Yekaterinoslav, Russian Empire
- Died: 26 December 1979 (aged 74); Moscow, Soviet Union
- Occupations: Film director, screenwriter
- Years active: 1923–1979

Lev Oskarovich Arnshtam (Russian: Ле́о (Лев) О́скарович Арншта́м; 15 January 1905 – 26 December 1979) was a Soviet film director and screenwriter. He directed nine films between 1936 and 1967. Arnshtam was named People's Artist of the RSFSR in 1969.

== Biography ==
Arnshtam was initially interested in music. He studied piano at Saint Petersburg Conservatory, graduating in 1923, and began a career as a professional pianist. He worked as the chief musical consultant for Vsevolod Meyerhold's theater in 1924–1927, before turning to cinema, where he became an expert in sound engineering. From 1929 to 1931, Arnshtam helped develop a sound track for Sergei Yutkevich's Golden Mountains, which originally had been conceived as a silent picture; he also contributed to its screenplay.

Arnshtam was one of the screenwriters of Yutkevich's and Fridrikh Ermler's film Counterplan (1932). Arnshtam's first independently directed picture was Girlfriends (1936), a film about the events in St. Petersburg following the 1917 revolution. The picture turned out to be a success. The film's three heroines grow from poor orphans to Bolshevik fighters who participate in the historical turmoil and defend St. Petersburg against the attacking White Army. Friends (1938) portrayed Communist Sergei Kirov and his political struggle in the Northern Caucasus. Drama film Zoya (1944) about partisan martyr Zoya Kosmodemyanskaya won Arnshtam a Stalin Prize in 1946 and a prize for Best Screenplay at the 1946 Cannes Film Festival. The score for Zoya, as for almost all of Arnshtam's films, was written by Dmitri Shostakovich, his former fellow student at the conservatory. With The Great Glinka (1947), Arnshtam turned to the founder of Russian opera; the film won its director another Stalin Prize. The Soviet-Bulgarian coproduction A Lesson in History (1957) was about the events surrounding the burning of the German Reichstag in 1933 and the subsequent Leipzig trial against Bulgarian Communist leader Georgi Dimitrov. Five Days, Five Nights (1960), coproduced with East Germany, tells about the dramatic rescue of artwork from the Dresden Gallery by Soviet soldiers in 1945. Arnshtam's final picture was the biopic Sofiya Perovskaya, about the woman who was behind the assassination of Tsar Alexander II.

== Filmography ==
- Girl Friends (Подруги) (1936)
- Friends (Друзья) (1938)
- Boyevoy kinosbornik 2 (1941)
- Zoya (Зоя) (1944)
- The Great Glinka (Глинка) (1946)
- Romeo and Juliet (Ромео и Джульетта) (1955)
- A Lesson in History (Урок истории) (1957)
- Five Days, Five Nights (Пять дней, пять ночей) (1960)
- Sofiya Perovskaya (Софья Перовская) (1967)
