= Rio Pequeno (district of São Paulo) =

District of São Paulo, Brazil

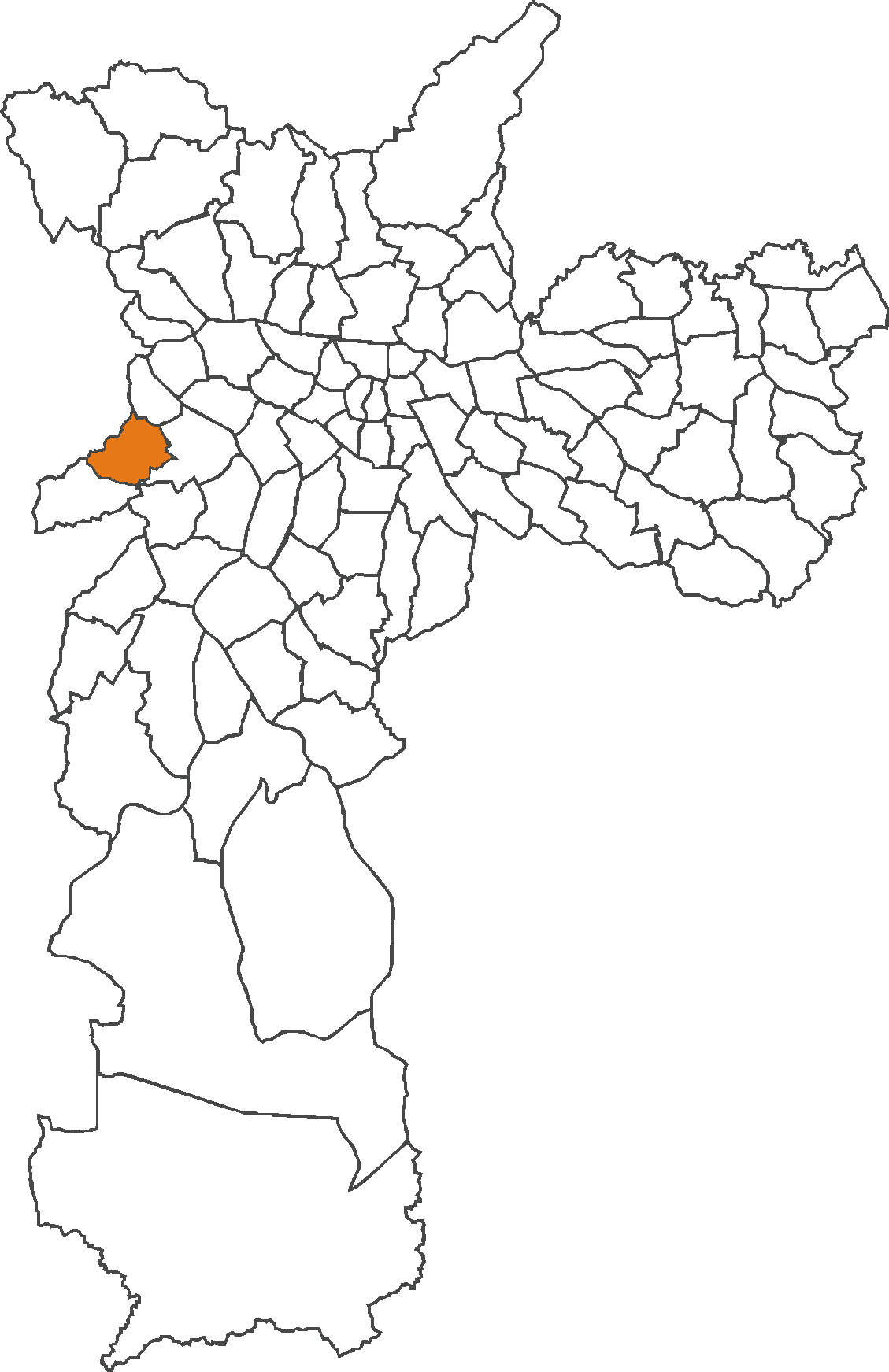
- The location of Rio Pequeno district in São Paulo

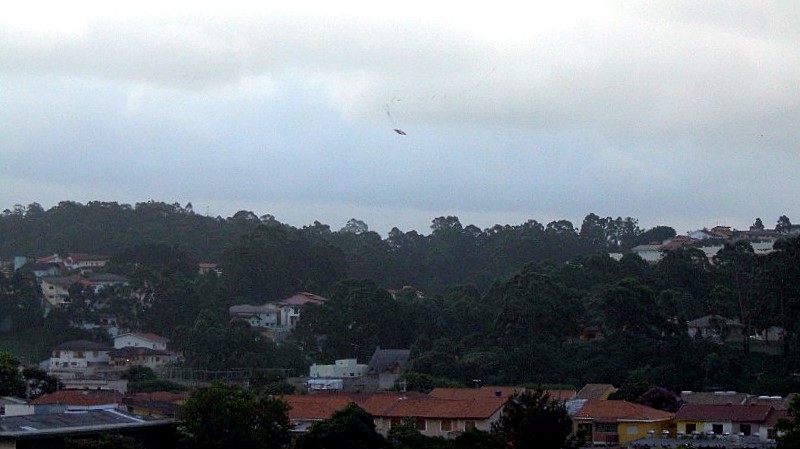
- Country: Brazil
- State: São Paulo
- City: São Paulo

Government
  - Type: Subprefecture
  - Subprefect: Daniel Barbosa Rodrigueiro
- Website: Subprefecture of Butantã

Rio Pequeno is a district in the Butantã subprefecture, located in the west zone of the city of São Paulo, Brazil.
