= Vila Sônia =

District of São Paulo, Brazil

Coordinates: 23°36′00″S 46°44′35″W

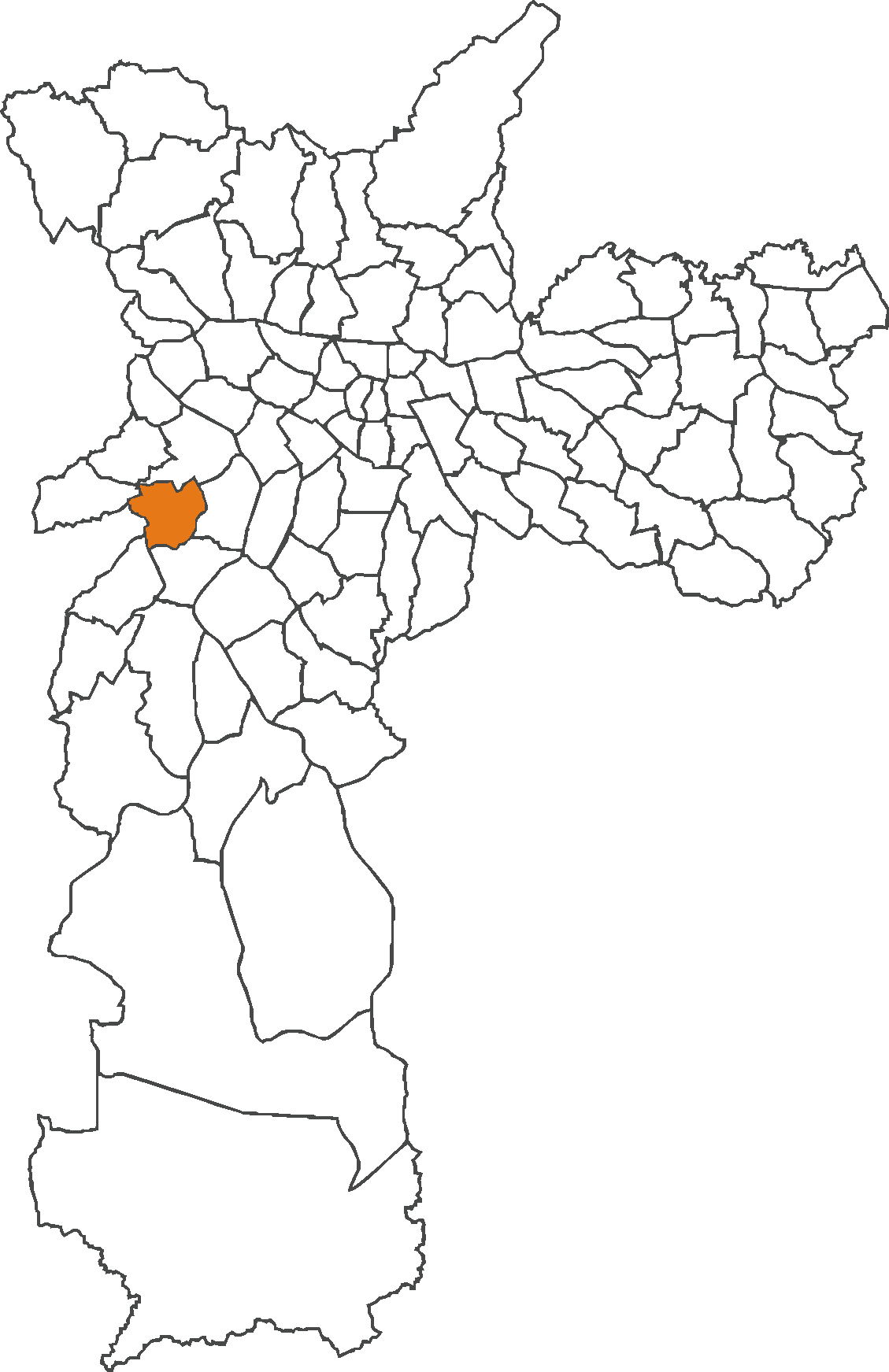
- The location of Vila Sônia district in São Paulo

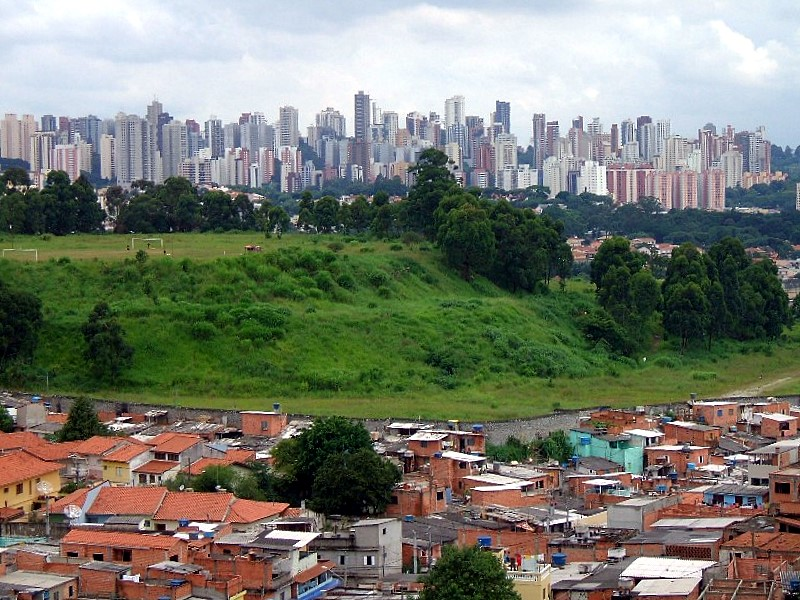
- Jaqueline Favela
- Country: Brazil
- State: São Paulo
- City: São Paulo

Government
  - Type: Subprefecture
  - Subprefect: Daniel Barbosa Rodrigueiro

Area
  - Total: 9.9 km^{2} (3.8 sq mi)

Population (2000)
  - Total: 87.379
  - Density: 8.826/km^{2} (22.86/sq mi)
- HDI: 0.895 –high
- Website: Subprefecture of Butantã

Vila Sônia is a district in the city of São Paulo, Brazil, it is the terminal of Line 4.
