= The Idiot (1958 film) =

1958 film

- Directed by: Ivan Pyryev
- Written by: Ivan Pyryev
- Based on: The Idiot by Fyodor Dostoevsky
- Starring: Yury Yakovlev; Yuliya Borisova; Nikita Podgorny; Vera Pashennaya; Sergey Martinson
- Cinematography: Valentin Pavlov; Vladimir Meybom
- Music by: Nikolai Kryukov
- Production company: Mosfilm
- Release date: 1958
- Running time: 124 minutes
- Country: Soviet Union
- Language: Russian

The Idiot (Russian: Идиот), is a 1958 Soviet film directed by Ivan Pyryev. It is based on Part 1 of the eponymous 1869 novel by Fyodor Dostoevsky; Yury Yakovlev declined to play the title character in a sequel which was never made.

== Plot ==
The film begins on a train bound for Saint Petersburg, where Prince Lev Nikolayevich Myshkin, recently returned to Russia after four years of treatment in a Swiss sanatorium, meets the wealthy merchant Parfyon Rogozhin. During their conversation, Myshkin learns about Nastasya Filippovna Barashkova, a former mistress of a nobleman named Totsky. Later, her name arises again during Myshkin's visit to the Epanchins, his only relatives, and in the household of the impoverished General Ivolgin, whose son Ganya is expected to marry Nastasya for financial gain despite her reputation as a "fallen woman." Myshkin's first impression of her, upon seeing her portrait in the Epanchins' home, is that her joyful appearance masks immense suffering, leaving him to wonder about her true character.

Nastasya Filippovna makes her first appearance during a heated confrontation at the Ivolgin household. Ganya's mother and sister, who view her as shameless, strongly oppose the proposed marriage. With her bold demeanor and cutting remarks, Nastasya escalates the family conflict, seemingly reveling in confirming their worst fears about her. However, her demeanor shifts when Rogozhin arrives with a group of drunken companions, causing her to appear unexpectedly unsettled. The tension reaches its peak when Ganya strikes Myshkin during an attempt to de-escalate the situation. Nastasya abruptly changes, apologizing to Ganya's mother and leaving the house, hinting at her deeper emotional complexity.

The film's climax occurs during a dramatic birthday gathering at Nastasya's apartment. She interacts with her guests in a manner ranging from sarcastic to contemptuous, except with Myshkin, to whom she reveals a softer, more vulnerable side. Thanking him for being the first person to truly see her, she takes a stack of Rogozhin's money, throws it into the fireplace, and challenges Ganya to retrieve it barehanded, promising him the full amount if he succeeds. When Ganya faints under the pressure, Nastasya retrieves the partially burnt money herself and tosses it to him before departing with Rogozhin, leaving behind a trail of shattered expectations and unresolved tensions.

== Cast ==
- Yury Yakovlev as Prince Lev (Leo) Myshkin
- Yuliya Borisova as Nastasya Filippovna Barashkova
- Nikita Podgorny as Ganya Ivolgin
- Vera Pashennaya as General's wife
- Sergey Martinson as Lebedev
- Leonid Parkhomenko as Parfyon Rogozhin
- Ivan Lyubeznov as General Ivolgin
- Raisa Maksimova as Aglaya Yepanchina
- Vladimir Muravyov as Ferdishchenko
- Grigory Shpigel as Ptitsyn
