= The Idiot (1951 film) =

1951 Japanese drama film

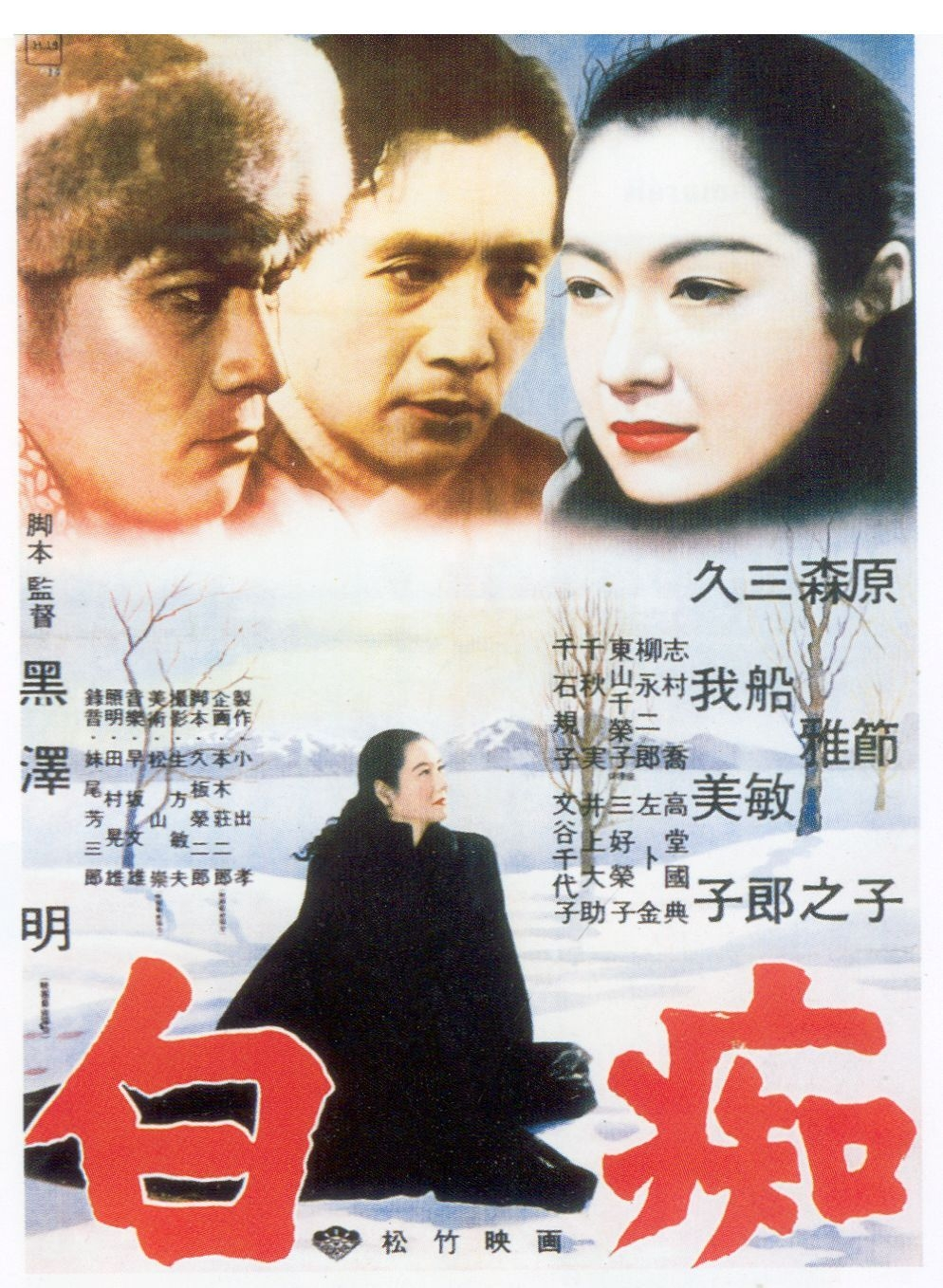
- Theatrical release poster showing Toshiro Mifune (left), Masayuki Mori (centre) and Setsuko Hara (right)

Japanese name
- Kanji: 白痴
Transcriptions
- Revised Hepburn: Hakuchi
- Directed by: Akira Kurosawa
- Screenplay by: Akira Kurosawa; Eijirō Hisaita
- Based on: The Idiot by Fyodor Dostoevsky
- Produced by: Takashi Koide
- Starring: Setsuko Hara; Yoshiko Kuga; Toshiro Mifune; Masayuki Mori; Takashi Shimura; Noriko Sengoku
- Cinematography: Toshio Ubukata
- Edited by: Yoshi Sugihara
- Music by: Fumio Hayasaka
- Production company: Shochiku
- Distributed by: Shochiku
- Release date: 23 May 1951
- Running time: 265 minutes (original; lost); 166 minutes (existing)
- Country: Japan
- Language: Japanese
- Budget: ¥70 million

The Idiot (Japanese: 白痴, Hepburn: Hakuchi) is a 1951 Japanese film directed by Akira Kurosawa from a screenplay co-written with Eijirō Hisaita. It is based on the 1869 novel The Idiot by Fyodor Dostoevsky. The original 265-minute version of the film, faithful to the novel, has been long lost. A nearly three-hour release currently survives as the most complete version of the film available for contemporary audiences.

The film stars Setsuko Hara who plays the part of Taeko Nasu, the beautiful mistress of Tohata. The characters are involved in a weblike plot of intersecting relationships.

== Plot ==
=== Part One: Love and Agony ===
The action starts on a ship traveling from Okinawa. Kameda, who suffers from "epileptic dementia" (which he refers to as "idiocy"), is heading to Hokkaido.

The movie explains that "Dostoevsky wanted to portray a genuinely good man. It may seem ironic, choosing a young idiot as his hero, but in this world, goodness and idiocy are often equated. The story tells of the destruction of a pure soul by a faithless world."

Kameda has been confined to a mental asylum since he suffered a mental breakdown after he was mistaken for a war criminal and almost executed by a firing squad following World War II. During his journey, he meets and becomes friends with Denkichi Akama, who "hadn't laughed for years. He was the son of an old Sapporo family, and his father's harsh discipline had made him feel like a caged animal. Oddly, he came to like Kameda, who made him laugh heartily. Akama told him (Kameda) about Taeko Nasu, whom he'd met six months earlier. One look at her had been enough to release his pent-up passions." Akama is returning home to Hokkaido for the first time since he stole money from his father to buy a diamond ring for Taeko. Taeko was the beautiful mistress of a rich man named Tohata since she was a child, but she ran away six months earlier, at the same time as when Akama had bought her the ring. Akama's father has since died, and he is on his way to claim a large inheritance. Akama and Kameda are both on the same train to Sapporo. Kameda is on his way to see Mr. Ono, "his only relative in the world".

Mr. Ono's wife asks her husband what he is going to do about Kameda. He tells her that he will try to find Kameda work and that Kameda can rent a room from Kayama, a man who is to marry Taeko in exchange for Y600,000. Kameda's father had left Kameda a large ranch, which Ono had sold through Kayama.

Kameda is unaware of his inheritance, which Ono's daughter, Ayako, later teases him about.

Tohata, in an attempt to sever his ties with Taeko and avoid public disgrace for his long-term abusive treatment of her, which has twisted her psyche and made her a social pariah, offers a dowry of Y600,000 to Kayama if he will marry Taeko, a deal which was brokered by Mr. Ono. Kayama secretly loves Ono's daughter Ayako. When Akama finds out about the dowry offer, he offers Kayama Y1,000,000 not to marry her in a threatening confrontation. Kameda and Taeko meet, and he is immediately drawn to and wants to help her with the sadness he sees in her, while she is drawn to the kindness she sees in him, which gives her the strength to run away from all of these men treating her like chattel. Kameda and Akama both follow Taeko, while Kayama, who is really attracted to Ono's daughter Ayako, does not.

Kameda tells Akama he should not marry Taeko as it would mean the ruin for both Taeko and Akama. Akama tells Kameda she really loves Kameda and Akama gives her to him.

=== Part Two: Love and Loathing ===
Taeko seems to love Kameda, but she thinks it would ruin his life to marry someone with her reputation, so she considers marrying Akama and writes to Ayako encouraging her to marry Kameda, since he is known to have written her a complimentary letter. Kameda proposes to Ayako. Ayako vacillates violently between expressing love and hate for Kameda and cannot understand what Taeko's true motives are, since they have never met. Ayako arranges for them to talk at Akama's house, and Taeko realizes that she has been putting Ayako on a pedestal and is no less worthy of Kameda's love than Ayako is. Ayako leaves, Kameda follows her to make sure she gets home safely, and Taeko faints, thinking Kameda has chosen Ayako over her.

When Kameda returns to Akama's house, he discovers that Akama, who is insanely jealous of the feelings he knows Taeko has for Kameda and not for him, but has been unable to make himself dislike Kameda when they see each other in person, has killed Taeko. He does not want her corpse to start to smell, so the two men do not light a fire and spend the night huddled around candles and bundled under blankets before they both, seemingly, die the next morning. Upon hearing this news, Ayako remarks that she is the idiot for not having been able to love without hatred, like Kameda did.

== Cast ==
Actor	Character	Novel analogue
Masayuki Mori	Kinji Kameda	Prince Myshkin
Toshiro Mifune	Denkichi Akama	Rogózhin
Setsuko Hara	Taeko Nasu	Nastasya Filippovna
Yoshiko Kuga	Ayako	Agláya Ivánovna
Takashi Shimura	Ono, Ayako's father	General Epanchín
Chieko Higashiyama	Satoko, Ayako's mother	Lizavéta Prokófyevna
Eijirō Yanagi	Tohata	Tótsky
Minoru Chiaki	Mutsuo Kayama, the secretary	Gavríl Ardaliónovich
Noriko Sengoku	Takako	Varvara

== Production background ==
The film is in black and white at an aspect ratio of 1.37:1. This was Kurosawa's second film for the Shochiku studio, after Scandal (1950).

It was originally intended to be a two-part film with a running time of 265 minutes. After a single, poorly received, screening of the full-length version, the film was severely cut at the request of the studio. This was against Kurosawa's wishes. When the re-edited version was also deemed too long by the studio, Kurosawa sardonically suggested the film be cut lengthwise instead. According to Japanese film scholar Donald Richie, there are no existing prints of the original 265-minute version. Kurosawa would return to Shochiku later to make Rhapsody in August (1991), and, according to Alex Cox, is said to have searched the Shochiku archives for the original cut of the film to no avail.

The Idiot was the first feature film to depict the Sapporo Snow Festival, an annual event in Sapporo, Hokkaido that began in 1950. In the movie, Kameda and Ayako visit the festival and see its large snow sculptures.

"Of all my films, people wrote to me most about this one... ...I had wanted to make The Idiot long before Rashomon. Since I was little I've liked Russian literature, but I find that I like Dostoevsky the best and had long thought that this book would make a wonderful film. He is still my favourite author, and he is the one — I still think — who writes most honestly about human existence."

— Akira Kurosawa

== Release ==
The Criterion Collection has released The Idiot on DVD in North America as part of two Kurosawa-centered box sets; 2008's Postwar Kurosawa, the seventh entry in their Eclipse series, and 2009's AK 100: 25 Films by Akira Kurosawa.

== Reception ==
Rotten Tomatoes reports 70% approval for The Idiot among ten critics, with an average rating of 6.9/10.

== See also ==
- List of incomplete or partially lost films
