= Yuliya Borisova =

Soviet and Russian actress (1925–2023)

- Юлия Борисова
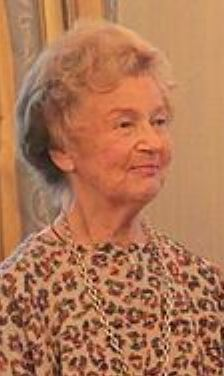
- Borisova in 2015
- Born: 17 March 1925; Moscow, Russian SFSR, Soviet Union
- Died: 8 August 2023 (aged 98); Moscow, Russia
- Resting place: Danilovskoye Cemetery
- Education: Boris Shchukin Theatre Institute
- Occupation: Actress
- Years active: 1947–2023
- Employer: Vakhtangov State Academic Theatre

Yuliya Konstantinovna Borisova (Note: Russian: Юлия Константиновна Борисова, romanized: Yuliya Konstantinovna Borisova) (17 March 1925 – 8 August 2023) was a Soviet and Russian stage and film actress. She played in the Vakhtangov Theatre for more than sixty years. One of the most notable roles that she played was that of Nastasya Filippovna in the film adaptation of Dostoevsky's novel The Idiot. She was also a politician, being member of the Supreme Soviet of Russia from 1963.

Borisova died in Moscow on 8 August 2023, at the age of 98.

== Filmograрhy ==
- Three Encounters (1948) as Oksana
- The Idiot (1958) as Nastasya Filipovna
- The Ambassador of the Soviet Union (1969) as Koltsova
