= Two Tickets for a Daytime Picture Show =

- Russian: Два билета на дневной сеанс
- Directed by: Gerbert Rappaport
- Written by: Boris Chirskov; Yevgeny Khudyakov
- Starring: Aleksandr Zbruyev; Zemfira Tsakhilova; Igor Gorbachyov; Pyotr Gorin; Aleksey Kozhevnikov
- Cinematography: Dmitry Meskhiev
- Edited by: Ye. Sadovskaya
- Music by: Aleksandr Mnatsakanyan
- Production company: Lenfilm
- Release date: 1966
- Running time: 90 min.
- Country: Soviet Union
- Language: Russian

Two Tickets for a Daytime Picture Show (Russian: Два билета на дневной сеанс, romanized: Dva bileta na dnevnoy seans) is a 1966 Soviet crime film directed by Gerbert Rappaport.

== Plot ==
The film tells about the Komsomol member Alyoshin, who goes to work in Department for Combating Theft of Socialist Property. Once in the workplace, he realizes that this is not his job and submits a report on dismissal. The boss, in turn, sets him a condition: Aleshin will be able to leave work, but only after completing one task. There were found two tickets from criminals to the cinema for the same place, but on different days. Alyoshin must figure it out...

== Cast ==
- Aleksandr Zbruyev as Alyoshin
- Zemfira Tsakhilova as Tonya
- Igor Gorbachyov as Nikolayev
- Pyotr Gorin as Shondysh
- Aleksey Kozhevnikov as Andreyev
- Nikita Podgorny as Lebedyansky
- Valentina Sperantova as mother of Lebedyansky
- Bruno Frejndlikh as Blinov
- Larisa Barabanova as 'Thumbtack'
- Vladimir Kenigson as Rubtsov
- Lyudmila Chursina as Inka
- Alexander Yanvarev as Sirotin
- Stanislav Chekan as Sabodage
- Emmanuil Vitorgan as Inka's husband
