= Henry Carlisle =

American novelist (1926–2011)

Henry Coffin Carlisle (September 14, 1926 – July 11, 2011) was a translator, novelist, and anti-censorship activist.

Carlisle, with his wife Olga Andreyeva Carlisle, was notable for translating Alexander Solzhenitsyn's work into English. Although Solzhenitsyn criticized the translations, Olga Carlisle felt they helped bring his work to a wider audience, and contributed to Solzhenitsyn's Nobel Prize.

== Novels ==
- Ilyitch Slept Here (1965)
- The Contract (1968)
- The Somers Mutiny (1972)
- Voyage to the First of December (1972)
- The Land Where the Sun Dies (1975)
- The Jonah Man aka “A Custom of the Sea”(1984)
- The Idealists (1999) (with Olga Carlisle)

== Translations ==
- The First Circle by Aleksandr Solzhenitsyn (with Olga Carlisle)
- The Gulag Archipelago by Aleksandr Solzhenitsyn (with Olga Carlisle)
- The Idiot by Fyodor Dostoevsky (1978, with Olga Carlisle)
