= Three Encounters =

1948 Soviet drama film

- Russian: Три встречи
- Directed by: Aleksandr Ptushko; Vsevolod Pudovkin; Sergei Yutkevich
- Written by: Mikhail Bleiman; Nikolay Pogodin; Sergei Yermolinsky
- Starring: Tamara Makarova; Boris Chirkov; Nikolay Kryuchkov; Yuliya Borisova; Klara Luchko
- Cinematography: Yevgeniy Nikolayevich Andrikanis; Igor Gelein; Arkadi Koltsaty; Fyodor Provorov
- Music by: Nikolai Kryukov
- Release date: 1948
- Country: Soviet Union

Three Encounters (Russian: Три встречи, romanized: Tri vstrechi) is a 1948 Soviet drama film directed by Aleksandr Ptushko, Vsevolod Pudovkin and Sergei Yutkevich.

== Plot ==
Three Encounters (1948)

The film consists of several novellas about people returning from the front: engineer-blast-furnace Kornev, who became a major, Sergeant-Major Samoseev, who became chairman of the collective farm, Senior Lieutenant Rudnikov, going to the Arctic expedition and Lieutenant Bella Mukhtarova, traveling with a group of geologists to the East.

== Cast ==
- Tamara Makarova as Olimpiada Samoseeva
- Boris Chirkov as Nikanor Samoseev
- Nikolay Kryuchkov as Maksim Kornev
- Yuliya Borisova as Oksana
- Klara Luchko as Bella
- Mikhail Derzhavin
- Leonid Kmit
- Andrey Tutyshkin
- Georgiy Yumatov
