= The Body of the Dead Christ in the Tomb =

Painting by Hans Holbein the Younger

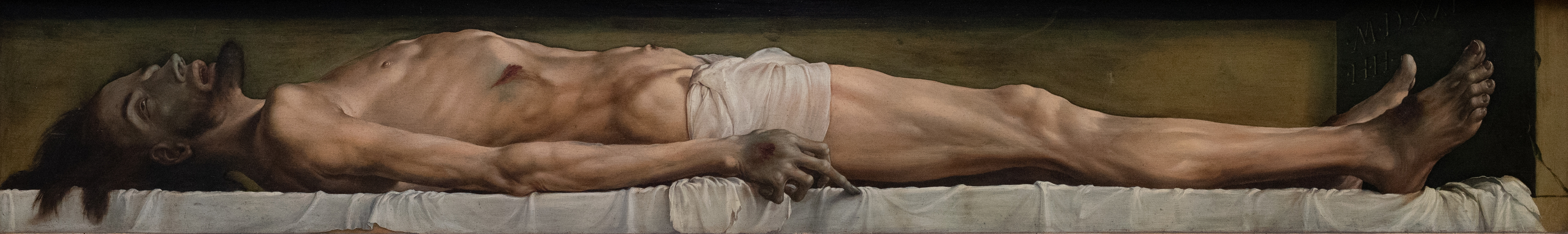
The Body of the Dead Christ in the Tomb (and detail, lower) 30.5 cm × 200 cm. Kunstmuseum Basel

The Body of the Dead Christ in the Tomb, sometimes referred to as Dead Christ, is an oil and tempera on limewood painting created by the German artist and printmaker Hans Holbein the Younger between 1520 and 1522.

It shows a life-size, grotesque depiction of the stretched and unnaturally thin body of Jesus Christ lying in his tomb. Holbein shows the dead Son of God after he has suffered the fate of an ordinary human. The painting is held in the Kunstmuseum Basel.

== Description ==
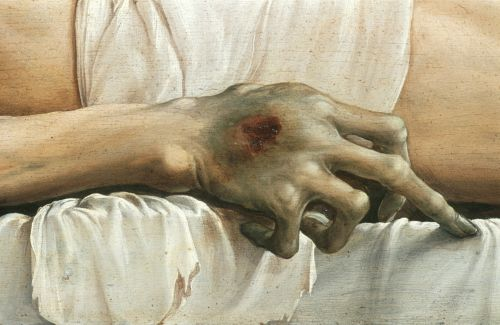
Detail

The painting is especially notable for its dramatic dimensions (30.5 cm x 200 cm), and the fact that Christ's face, hands and feet, as well as the wounds in his torso, are depicted as realistic dead flesh in the early stages of putrefaction. His body is shown as long and emaciated while eyes and mouth are left open.

Christ is shown with three visible wounds: on his hand, side and feet. Discussing the artist's use of unflinching realism, art historians Oscar Bätschmann and Pascal Griener noted that Christ's raised and extended middle finger appears to "reach towards the beholder", while his strands of hair "look as if they are breaking through the surface of the painting". Above the body, angels holding instruments of the Passion bear an inscription in brush on paper inscribed with the Latin words "IESVS·NAZARENVS·REX·IVDÆORVM" (Jesus of Nazareth, King of the Jews).

== Background ==
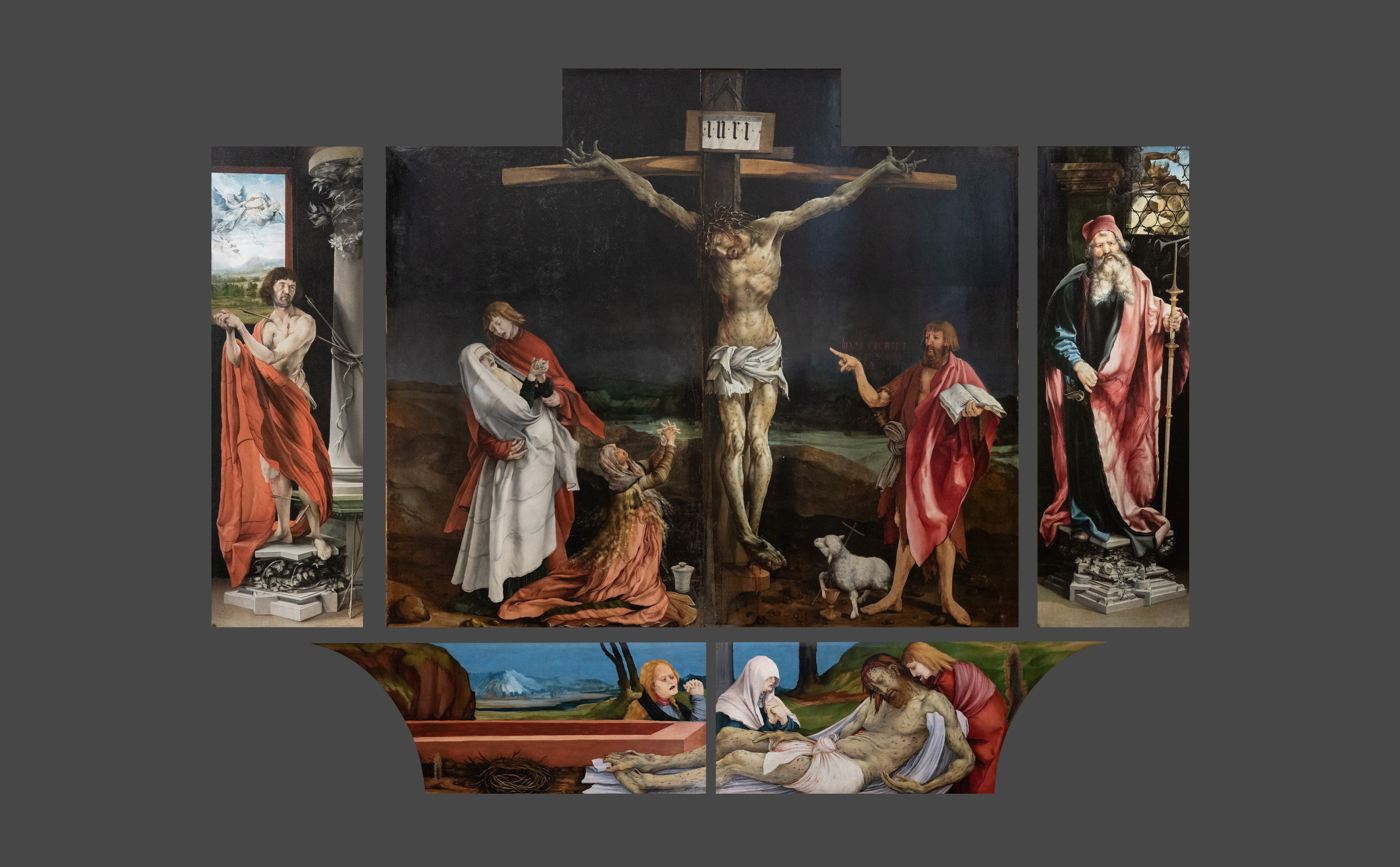
Centerpiece of Matthias Grünewald's Isenheim Altarpiece

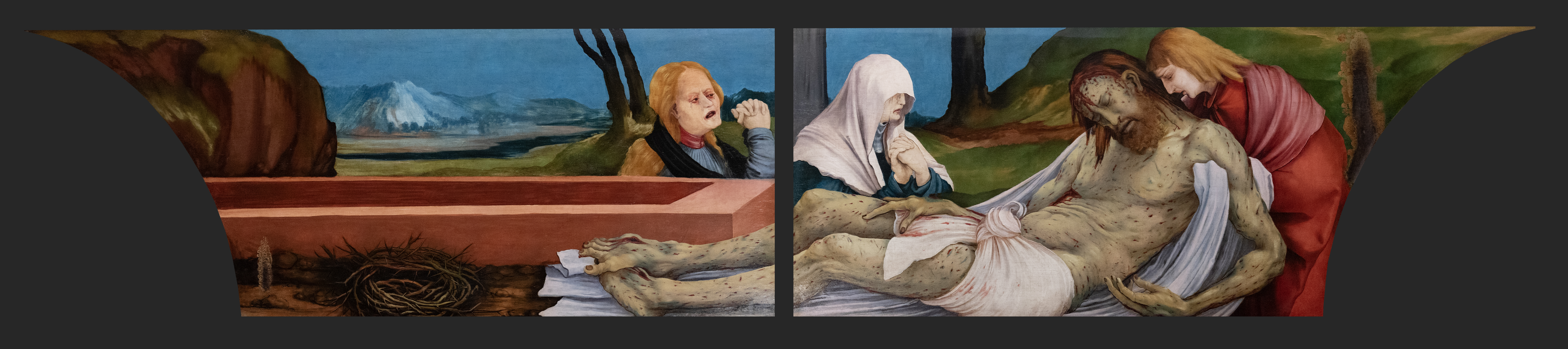
Matthias Grünewald, Lamentation and Entombment of Christ; (predella of the Isenheim Altarpiece), 1512–15, Musee d'Unterlinden, Colmar

In common with many artists active during the early Protestant Reformation, Holbein was fascinated with the macabre. His father, Hans Holbein the Elder, took him to see Matthias Grünewald's altarpiece in Isenheim, a city in which the elder also received a number of commissions from the local hospice. In common with the religious traditions of the 1520s, the work was intended to evoke piety and follows the intentions of Grünewald, who in his altarpiece set out to instil feelings of both guilt and empathy in the viewer.

It is unknown why the painting was commissioned. Various suggestions have been offered, including as a predella for an altarpiece, a free-standing work, or an ornament for a sepulchre. The painting was commissioned by Bonifacius Amerbach, who was also portrayed by Hans Holbein. Subsequently, it was included in the Amerbach Cabinet where it was described as a "Picture of a dead man by H. Holbein...with the title Iesus Nazarenus rex".

In 1999, Bätschmann and Griener raised the possibility that the panel was intended to form part of a Holy Tomb, perhaps as a lid to be laid over a sepulchre. According to legend, Holbein used a body retrieved from the Rhine as a model for the work. "Whether this is true or not, there is no doubt of his attempt to be totally convincing." The painting is exhibited in the Kunstmuseum Basel.

== Analysis ==
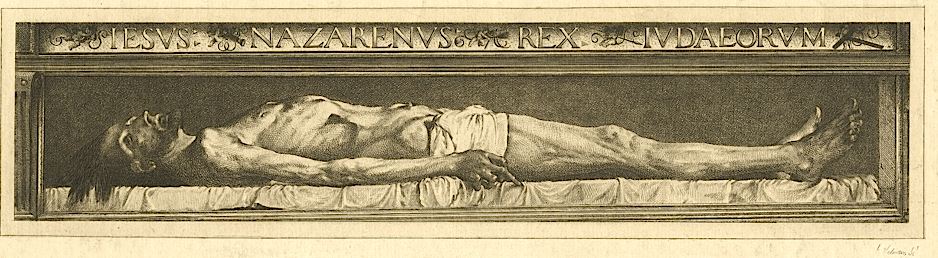
Henry Augustin Valentin after Hans Holbein the Younger, Iesvs Nazarenevs Rex Ivdaeorvm, 19th century, etching, Department of Image Collections, National Gallery of Art Library, Washington, DC

The panel has attracted fascination and praise since it was created. The work captivated the Russian author Fyodor Dostoevsky who said "One can lose his faith from a painting like that". In 1867, his wife had to drag him away from the panel lest its grip on him induce an epileptic seizure. Dostoevsky saw in Holbein an impulse similar to one of his own main literary preoccupations: the pious desire to confront Christian faith with everything that negated it, in this case the laws of nature and the stark reality of death. In his 1869 novel The Idiot, the character Prince Myshkin, having viewed a copy of the painting in the home of Rogozhin, declares that it has the power to make the viewer lose his faith. The character of Ippolit Terentyev, an articulate exponent of atheism and nihilism who is himself near death, engages in a long philosophical discussion of the painting, claiming that it demonstrates the victory of 'blind nature' over everything, including even the most perfect and beautiful of beings.

The effect of the open eyes and mouth has been described by the art critic Michel Onfray as giving the impression that "the viewer sees Christ seeing: he might also perceive what death has in store, because he's staring at the heavens, while his soul is probably there already. No-one has taken the trouble to close his mouth and his eyes. Or else Holbein wants to tell us that, even in death, Christ still looks and speaks."

== Sources ==
- Bätschmann, Oskar & Griener, Pascal. Hans Holbein. Reaktion Books, 1997. ISBN 1-86189-040-0. Revised and expanded edition, London: Reaktion Books, 2014. ISBN 978-1-78023-171-6.
- Meyers, Jeffrey. "Holbein and the Idiot," in Meyers, Jeffrey, Painting and the Novel. London: Manchester University Press, 1975. New York: Barnes & Noble Books, 1975.
- Kristeva, Julia. Black Sun: Depression and Melancholia. New York: Columbia University Press, 1989.
