= Nikita Podgorny =

Soviet actor

- Born: Nikita Vladimirovich Podgorny; 16 February 1931; Moscow, Soviet Union
- Died: 24 September 1982 (aged 51); Moscow, Soviet Union
- Occupation: Actor
- Years active: 1954–1982

Nikita Vladimirovich Podgorny (Russian: Ники́та Влади́мирович Подго́рный; 16 February 1931 — 24 September 1982) was a Soviet and Russian stage and film actor. People's Artist of the RSFSR (1971).

== Biography ==
He was born in Moscow.

He graduated from the Mikhail Shchepkin Higher Theatre School (1954).

He played in the Maly Theatre since 1954. During his studies, he married his classmate Ninel Podgornaya, but a few years later divorced her.

== Death ==
He died in Moscow from cancer. He was buried at the Vagankovo Cemetery (station number 38).

== Selected filmography ==
- The Idiot (1958) – Ganya Ivolgin
- Michman Panin (1960) – Vedernikov
- The Salvos of the Aurora Cruiser (1965) – Alexander Kerensky
- Two Tickets for a Daytime Picture Show (1966) – Anatoly Borisovich Lebedyansky
- The Brothers Karamazov (1968) – Mikhail Osipovich Rakitin
- Autumn Marathon (1979) – Georgy Nikolayevich Verigin

== Awards ==
- Honored Artist of the RSFSR (1964)
- People's Artist of the RSFSR (1971)
- Order of the Badge of Honour (1974)
- Order of the Red Banner of Labour (1981)
