= Olga Andreyeva Carlisle =

American novelist

- Born: January 22, 1930 (age 96); Paris, France
- Education: Bard College
- Occupations: Novelist; translator; painter
- Spouse: Henry Carlisle
- Parent(s): Vadim Andreyev; Olga Chernova-Andreyeva
- Relatives: Leonid Andreyev (grandfather)

Olga Andreyeva Carlisle (born 22 January 1930) is a French-born American novelist, translator, and painter. Carlisle, with her husband Henry Carlisle, is notable for translating Alexander Solzhenitsyn's work into English.

== Biography ==
Carlisle was born in Paris to a Russian literary family. Her father, Vadim Andreyev, was the son of Russian writer Leonid Andreyev. Her mother, Olga Chernova-Andreyeva, was the stepdaughter of Viktor Chernov, a Russian revolutionary and one of the founders of the Russian Socialist-Revolutionary Party.

Carlisle attended Bard College in New York from 1949 to 1953. She met her husband Henry Carlisle during this time and they moved to New York City in 1953. She now lives in San Francisco.

As an artist, Carlisle's paintings have been shown in Paris and across the United States. She was mentored by Louis Schanker in the 1940s; then Earl Loran and Robert Motherwell in the 1950s.

== Works ==
- Voices in the Snow (1962)
- Poets on Street Corners (1968)
- Solzhenitsyn and the Secret Circle (1978)
- Island of Time (1980)
- Under a New Sky (1993)
- The Idealists (1999) (with Henry Carlisle)
- Far from Russia (2000)

== Translations ==
- The First Circle by Aleksandr Solzhenitsyn (with Henry Carlisle)
- The Gulag Archipelago by Aleksandr Solzhenitsyn (with Henry Carlisle)
- The Idiot by Fyodor Dostoevsky (1978, with Henry Carlisle)
