= Michman Panin =

- Directed by: Mikhail Schweitzer
- Written by: Semyon Lungin; Ilya Nusinov
- Starring: Vyacheslav Tikhonov; Nikolai Sergeyev; Nikita Podgorny
- Cinematography: Timofey Lebeshev
- Music by: Veniamin Basner
- Production company: Mosfilm Studios
- Distributed by: Mosfilm
- Release date: 1960
- Running time: 96 minutes
- Country: Soviet Union
- Language: Russian

Michman Panin (Russian: Мичман Панин, or Warrant Officer Panin) is a 1960 Soviet war film directed by Mikhail Schweitzer.

== Plot ==
The storyline of the movie is based on the memoirs of an old Bolshevik named Vasily Lukich Panyushkin. It is May 1912. Thirteen political prisoners are being tried in a naval fortress of Kronstadt. They are sentenced to death by hanging. A clandestine Bolshevik organization decides to free the prisoners during their transfer to the place of execution. Vasily Panin (played by Vyacheslav Tikhonov), a junker of a school of naval engineers, is one of those entrusted with this dangerous task. The day Panin is promoted to warrant officer is the day he is baptized by fire. In the evening of that same day Panin arrives at a military vessel named Elizaveta, which is supposed to leave for France the next morning. The freed prisoners go out into the sea on a fishing boat and soon find themselves in a desperate situation. Panin and other Bolshevik seamen onboard Elizaveta hide the fugitives in a non-operational boiler of the ship. Elizaveta sails on. Naval officers and petty officers dart about the ship and are close to discovering the fugitives. Petty officer Savichev (Leonid Kmit) comes across the fugitives, and Panin throws him overboard. Finally, Elizaveta arrives in Le Havre. The fugitives manage to disembark under the guise of sailors on shore leave. Warrant officer Panin is a relief commander. That same evening the crew returns from their shore leave short of thirteen people. Captain Sergeyev of Elizaveta (Nikolai Sergeyev) realizes that warrant officer Panin has something to do with the escape and offers him to remain in France. In France, Panin establishes contact with local Bolshevik emigres, who provide him with the money and a passport to return to Russia. He receives a letter from Vladimir Lenin, in which the latter expresses his regret regarding Panin's being away from the Navy. And then warrant officer Panin decides to return to his ship in Kronstadt. He is arrested and stands trial. At the trial, however, he tells a made-up story about his love affairs, and the court decides to simply demote him to the ranks. Upon becoming a matrose, Panin joins the revolutionary movement yet again.

== Cast ==
- Vyacheslav Tikhonov as Warrant officer Vasily Panin
- Nikolai Sergeyev as Captain Nikolai Vasilyevich Sergeyev
- Nikita Podgorny as Warrant Officer Vedernikov
- Leonid Kuravlyov as Stoker Pyotr Kamushkin
- Ivan Pereverzev as Boatswain Ivan Grigoryev
- Lev Polyakov as Lieutenant Gruzinov
- Oleg Golubitsky as Lieutenant Stanislav Mikhailovich Pekarsky
- Leonid Kmit as Petty Officer Savichev
- Vladimir Pokrovsky as Executive officer Commander Farafontyev
- Nikolai Pazhitnov as Dr.Bach
- Grigory Shpigel as Father Feoktist, ship's chaplain
- Evgeny Teterin as Admiral Viren
- Daniil Netrebin as Seaman Markelov
- Grigory Mikhailov as Seaman Barabanov
- Nikolai Grabbe as Seaman Rysman
- Rudolf Pankov as Cadet Obysov
- Mikhail Gluzsky as Usoltsev
