= The Idiot =

1868–69 novel by Fyodor Dostoyevsky

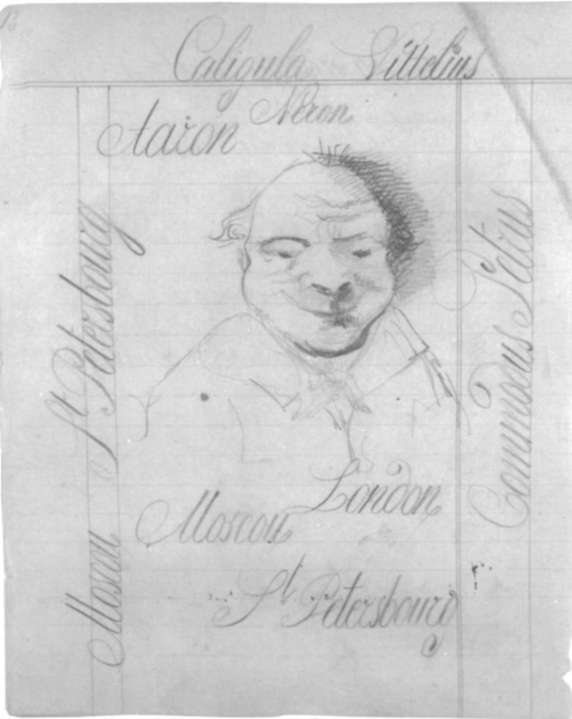
- Drawing and handwritten text by Fyodor Dostoevsky
- Author: Fyodor Dostoevsky
- Original title: Идиот
- Genre: Novel
- Published: 1868–1869
- Publisher: The Russian Messenger
- Pages: 659
- Preceded by: Crime and Punishment
- Followed by: Demons
- Original text: Идиот at Russian Wikisource
- Translation: The Idiot at Wikisource

The Idiot (pre-reform Russian: Идіотъ; post-reform Russian: Идиот, romanized: Idiót) is a novel by the 19th-century Russian author Fyodor Dostoevsky. It was first published serially in the journal The Russian Messenger in 1868–1869.

The title is an ironic reference to the central character of the novel, Lev Nikolayevich Myshkin, a young prince whose goodness, open-hearted simplicity, and guilelessness lead many of the more worldly characters he encounters to mistakenly assume that he lacks intelligence and insight. In the character of Prince Myshkin, Dostoevsky set himself the task of depicting "the positively good and beautiful man." The novel examines the consequences of placing such a singular individual at the centre of the conflicts, desires, passions, and egoism of worldly society, both for the man himself and for those with whom he becomes involved.

Joseph Frank describes The Idiot as "the most personal of all Dostoevsky's major works, the book in which he embodies his most intimate, cherished, and sacred convictions." It includes descriptions of some of his most intense personal ordeals, such as epilepsy and mock execution, and explores moral, spiritual, and philosophical themes consequent upon them. His primary motivation in writing the novel was to subject his own highest ideal, that of true Christian love, to the crucible of contemporary Russian society.

The artistic method of conscientiously testing his central idea meant that the author could not always predict where the plot was going as he was writing. The novel has an awkward structure, and many critics have commented on its seemingly chaotic organization. According to Gary Saul Morson, "The Idiot violates every critical norm and yet somehow manages to achieve real greatness." Dostoevsky himself was of the opinion that the experiment was not entirely successful, but the novel remained his favourite among his works. In a letter to Nikolay Strakhov he wrote, "Much in the novel was written hurriedly, much is too diffuse and did not turn out well, but some of it did turn out well. I do not stand behind the novel, but I do stand behind the idea."

== Background ==
In September 1867, when Dostoevsky began work on what was to become The Idiot, he was living in Switzerland with his new wife Anna Grigoryevna, having left Russia in order to escape his creditors. They were living in extreme poverty, and constantly had to borrow money or pawn their possessions. They were evicted from their lodgings five times for non-payment of rent, and by the time the novel was finished in January 1869 they had moved between four different cities in Switzerland and Italy. During this time Dostoevsky periodically fell into the grip of his gambling addiction and lost what little money they had on the roulette tables. He was subject to regular and severe epileptic seizures, including one while Anna was going into labor with their daughter Sofia, delaying their ability to go for a midwife. The baby died aged only three months, and Dostoevsky blamed himself for the loss.

Dostoevsky's notebooks of 1867 reveal deep uncertainty as to the direction he was taking with the novel. Detailed plot outlines and character sketches were made, but were quickly abandoned and replaced with new ones. In one early draft, the character who was to become Prince Myshkin is an evil man who commits a series of terrible crimes, including the rape of his adopted sister (Nastasya Filippovna), and who only arrives at goodness by way of his conversion through Christ. By the end of the year, however, a new premise had been firmly adopted. In a letter to Apollon Maykov, Dostoevsky explained that his own desperate circumstances had "forced" him to seize on an idea that he had considered for some time but had been afraid of, feeling himself to be artistically unready for it. This was the idea to "depict a completely beautiful human being". Rather than bring a man to goodness, he wanted to start with a man who was already a truly Christian soul, someone who is essentially innocent and deeply compassionate, and test him against the psychological, social, and political complexities of the modern Russian world. It was not only a matter of how the good man responded to that world, but of how it responded to him. Devising a series of scandalous scenes, he would "examine each character's emotions and record what each would do in response to Myshkin and to the other characters." The difficulty with this approach was that he himself did not know in advance how the characters were going to respond, and thus he was unable to pre-plan the plot or structure of the novel. Nonetheless, in January 1868 the first chapters of The Idiot were sent off to The Russian Messenger.

== Plot ==
=== Part 1 ===
Prince Myshkin, a young man in his mid-twenties and a descendant of one of the oldest Russian lines of nobility, is on a train to Saint Petersburg on a cold November morning. He is returning to Russia having spent the past four years in a Swiss clinic for treatment of a severe epileptic condition. On the journey, Myshkin meets a young man of the merchant class, Parfyon Semyonovich Rogozhin, and is struck by his passionate intensity, particularly in relation to a woman—the dazzling society beauty Nastasya Filippovna Barashkova—with whom he is obsessed. Rogozhin has just inherited a very large fortune due to the death of his father, and he intends to use it to pursue the object of his desire. Joining in their conversation is a civil servant named Lebedyev—a man with a profound knowledge of social trivia and gossip. Realizing who Rogozhin is, Lebedyev firmly attaches himself to him.

The purpose of Myshkin's trip is to make the acquaintance of his distant relative Lizaveta Prokofyevna, and to make inquiries about a matter of business. Lizaveta Prokofyevna is married to General Epanchin, a wealthy and respected man in his mid-fifties. When the Prince calls on them he meets Gavril Ardalionovich Ivolgin (Ganya), the General's assistant. The General and his business partner, the aristocrat Totsky, are seeking to arrange a marriage between Ganya and Nastasya Filippovna. Totsky had been the orphaned Nastasya Filippovna's childhood guardian, but he had taken advantage of his position to groom her for his own sexual gratification. As a grown woman, Nastasya Filippovna has developed an incisive and merciless insight into their relationship. Totsky, thinking the marriage might settle her and free him to pursue his desire for marriage with General Epanchin's eldest daughter, has promised 75,000 rubles. Nastasya Filippovna, suspicious of Ganya and aware that his family does not approve of her, has reserved her decision, but has promised to announce it that evening at her birthday soirée. Ganya and the General openly discuss the subject in front of Myshkin. Ganya shows him a photograph of her, and he is particularly struck by the dark beauty of her face.

Myshkin makes the acquaintance of Lizaveta Prokofyevna and her three daughters—Alexandra, Adelaida and Aglaya. They are all very curious about him and not shy about expressing their opinion, particularly Aglaya. He readily engages with them and speaks with remarkable candor on a wide variety of subjects—his illness, his impressions of Switzerland, art, philosophy, love, death, the brevity of life, capital punishment, and donkeys. In response to their request that he speak of the time he was in love, he tells a long anecdote from his time in Switzerland about a downtrodden woman—Marie—whom he befriended, along with a group of children, when she was unjustly ostracized and morally condemned. The Prince ends by describing what he divines about each of their characters from studying their faces and surprises them by saying that Aglaya is almost as beautiful as Nastasya Filippovna.

The prince rents a room in the Ivolgin apartment, occupied by Ganya's family and another lodger called Ferdyschenko. There is much angst within Ganya's family about the proposed marriage, which is regarded, particularly by his mother and sister (Varya), as shameful. Just as a quarrel on the subject is reaching a peak of tension, Nastasya Filippovna herself arrives to pay a visit to her potential new family. Shocked and embarrassed, Ganya succeeds in introducing her, but when she bursts into a prolonged fit of laughter at the look on his face, his expression transforms into one of murderous hatred. The Prince intervenes to calm him down, and Ganya's rage is diverted toward him in a violent gesture. The tension is not eased by the entrance of Ganya's father, General Ivolgin, a drunkard with a tendency to tell elaborate lies. Nastasya Filippovna flirtatiously encourages the General and then mocks him. Ganya's humiliation is compounded by the arrival of Rogozhin, accompanied by a rowdy crowd of drunks and rogues, Lebedyev among them. Rogozhin openly starts bidding for Nastasya Filippovna, ending with an offer of a hundred thousand rubles. With the scene assuming increasingly scandalous proportions, Varya angrily demands that someone remove the "shameless woman". Ganya seizes his sister's arm, and she responds, to Nastasya Filippovna's delight, by spitting in his face. He is about to strike her when the Prince again intervenes, and Ganya slaps him violently in the face. Everyone is deeply shocked, including Nastasya Filippovna, and she struggles to maintain her mocking aloofness as the others seek to comfort the Prince. Myshkin admonishes her and tells her it is not who she really is. She apologizes to Ganya's mother and leaves, telling Ganya to be sure to come to her birthday party that evening. Rogozhin and his retinue go off to raise the 100,000 rubles.

Among the guests at the party are Totsky, General Epanchin, Ganya, his friend Ptitsyn (Varya's fiancé), and Ferdyshchenko, who, with Nastasya Filippovna's approval, plays the role of cynical buffoon. With the help of Ganya's younger brother Kolya, the Prince arrives, uninvited. To enliven the party, Ferdyshchenko suggests a game where everyone must recount the story of the worst thing they have ever done. Others are shocked at the proposal, but Nastasya Filippovna is enthusiastic. When it comes to Totsky's turn he tells a long but innocuous anecdote from the distant past. Disgusted, Nastasya Filippovna turns to Myshkin and demands his advice on whether or not to marry Ganya. Myshkin advises her not to, and Nastasya Filippovna, to the dismay of Totsky, General Epanchin and Ganya, firmly announces that she is following this advice. At this point, Rogozhin and his followers arrive with the promised 100,000 rubles. Nastasya Filipovna is preparing to leave with him, exploiting the scandalous scene to humiliate Totsky, when Myshkin himself offers to marry her. He speaks gently and sincerely, and in response to incredulous queries about what they will live on, produces a document indicating that he will soon be receiving a large inheritance. Though surprised and deeply touched, Nastasya Filipovna, after throwing the 100,000 rubles in the fire and telling Ganya they are his if he wants to get them out, chooses to leave with Rogozhin. Myshkin follows them.

=== Part 2 ===
For the next six months, Nastasya Filippovna remains unsettled and is torn between Myshkin and Rogozhin. Myshkin is tormented by her suffering, and Rogozhin is tormented by her love for Myshkin and her disdain for his own claims on her. Returning to Petersburg, the Prince visits Rogozhin's house. Myshkin becomes increasingly horrified at Rogozhin's attitude to her. Rogozhin confesses to beating her in a jealous rage and raises the possibility of cutting her throat. Despite the tension between them, they part as friends, with Rogozhin even making a gesture of concession. But the Prince remains troubled and for the next few hours he wanders the streets, immersed in intense contemplation. He suspects that Rogozhin is watching him and returns to his hotel where Rogozhin—who has been hiding in the stairway—attacks him with a knife. At the same moment, the Prince is struck down by a violent epileptic seizure, and Rogozhin flees in a panic.

Recovering, Myshkin joins Lebedyev (from whom he is renting a dacha) in the summer resort town Pavlovsk. He knows that Nastasya Filippovna is in Pavlovsk and that Lebedyev is aware of her movements and plans. The Epanchins, who are also in Pavlovsk, visit the Prince. They are joined by their friend Yevgeny Pavlovich Radomsky, a handsome and wealthy military officer with a particular interest in Aglaya. Aglaya, however, is more interested in the Prince, and to Myshkin's embarrassment and everyone else's amusement, she recites Pushkin's poem "The Poor Knight" in a reference to his noble efforts to save Nastasya Filippovna.

The Epanchins' visit is rudely interrupted by the arrival of Burdovsky, a young man who claims to be the illegitimate son of Myshkin's late benefactor, Pavlishchev. The inarticulate Burdovsky is supported by a group of insolent young men. These include the consumptive seventeen-year-old Ippolit Terentyev, the nihilist Doktorenko, and Keller, an ex-officer who, with the help of Lebedyev, has written an article vilifying the Prince and Pavlishchev. They demand money from Myshkin as a "just" reimbursement for Pavlishchev's support, but their arrogant bravado is severely dented when Gavril Ardalionovitch, who has been researching the matter on Myshkin's behalf, proves conclusively that the claim is false and that Burdovsky has been deceived. The Prince tries to reconcile with the young men and offers financial support anyway. Disgusted, Lizaveta Prokofyevna loses all control and furiously attacks both parties. Ippolit laughs, and Lizaveta Prokofyevna seizes him by the arm, causing him to break into a prolonged fit of coughing. But he suddenly becomes calm, informs them all that he is near death, and politely requests that he be permitted to talk to them for a while. He awkwardly attempts to express his need for their love, eventually bringing both himself and Lizaveta Prokofyevna to the point of tears. But as the Prince and Lizaveta Prokofyevna discuss what to do with the invalid, another transformation occurs and Ippolit, after unleashing a torrent of abuse at the Prince, leaves with the other young men. The Epanchins also leave, both Lizaveta Prokofyevna and Aglaya deeply indignant with the Prince. Only Yevgeny Pavlovich remains in good spirits, and he smiles charmingly as he says good-bye. At that moment, a magnificent carriage pulls up at the dacha, and the ringing voice of Nastasya Filippovna calls out to Yevgeny Pavlovich. In a familiar tone, she tells him not to worry about all the IOUs as Rogozhin has bought them up. The carriage departs, leaving everyone, particularly Yevgeny Pavlovich and the Prince, in a state of shock. Yevgeny Pavlovich claims to know nothing about the debts, and Nastasya Filippovna's motives become a subject of anxious speculation.

=== Part 3 ===
Reconciling with Lizaveta Prokofyevna, the Prince visits the Epanchins at their dacha. He is beginning to fall in love with Aglaya, and she likewise appears to be fascinated by him, though she often mocks or angrily reproaches him for his naiveté and excessive humility. Myshkin joins Lizaveta Prokofyevna, her daughters and Yevgeny Pavlovich for a walk to the park to hear the music. While listening to the high-spirited conversation and watching Aglaya in a kind of daze, he notices Rogozhin and Nastasya Filippovna in the crowd. Nastasya Filippovna again addresses herself to Yevgeny Pavlovich, and in the same jolly tone as before loudly informs him that his uncle—a wealthy and respected old man from whom he is expecting a large inheritance—has shot himself and that a huge sum of government money is missing. Yevgeny Pavlovich stares at her in shock as Lizaveta Prokofyevna makes a hurried exit with her daughters. Nastasya Filippovna hears an officer friend of Yevgeny Pavlovich suggest that a whip is needed for women like her, and she responds by grabbing a riding-whip from a bystander and striking the officer across the face with it. He tries to attack her but Myshkin restrains him, for which he is violently pushed. Rogozhin, after making a mocking comment to the officer, leads Nastasya Filippovna away. The officer recovers his composure, addresses himself to Myshkin, politely confirms his name, and leaves.

Myshkin follows the Epanchins back to their dacha, where eventually Aglaya finds him alone on the verandah. To his surprise, she begins to talk to him very earnestly about duels and how to load a pistol. They are interrupted by General Epanchin who wants Myshkin to walk with him. Aglaya slips a note into Myshkin's hand as they leave. The General is greatly agitated by the effect Nastasya Filippovna's behavior is having on his family, particularly since her information about Yevgeny Pavlovich's uncle has turned out to be completely correct. When the General leaves, Myshkin reads Aglaya's note, which is an urgent request to meet her secretly the following morning. His reflections are interrupted by Keller who has come to offer to be his second at the duel that will inevitably follow from the incident that morning, but Myshkin merely laughs heartily and invites Keller to visit him to drink champagne. Keller departs and Rogozhin appears. He informs the Prince that Nastasya Filippovna wants to see him and that she has been in correspondence with Aglaya. She is convinced that the Prince is in love with Aglaya, and is seeking to bring them together. Myshkin is perturbed by the information, but he remains in an inexplicably happy frame of mind and speaks with forgiveness and brotherly affection to Rogozhin. Remembering it will be his birthday tomorrow, he persuades Rogozhin to join him for some wine.

They find that a large party has assembled at his home and that the champagne is already flowing. Present are Lebedyev, his daughter Vera, Ippolit, Burdovsky, Kolya, General Ivolgin, Ganya, Ptitsyn, Ferdyshchenko, Keller, and, to Myshkin's surprise, Yevgeny Pavlovich, who has come to ask for his friendship and advice. The guests greet the Prince warmly and compete for his attention. Stimulated by Lebedyev's eloquence, everyone engages for some time in intelligent and inebriated disputation on lofty subjects, but the good-humoured atmosphere begins to dissipate when Ippolit suddenly produces a large envelope and announces that it contains an essay he has written which he now intends to read to them. The essay is a painfully detailed description of the events and thoughts leading him to what he calls his 'final conviction': that suicide is the only possible way to affirm his will in the face of nature's invincible laws, and that consequently he will be shooting himself at sunrise. The reading drags on for over an hour and by its end the sun has risen. Most of his audience, however, are bored and resentful, apparently not at all concerned that he is about to shoot himself. Only Vera, Kolya, Burdovsky, and Keller seek to restrain him. He distracts them by pretending to abandon the plan, then suddenly pulls out a small pistol, puts it to his temple and pulls the trigger. There is a click but no shot: Ippolit faints but is not killed. It turns out that he had taken out the cap earlier and forgotten to put it back in. Ippolit is devastated and tries desperately to convince everyone that it was an accident. Eventually he falls asleep and the party disperses.

The Prince wanders for some time in the park before falling asleep at the green seat appointed by Aglaya as their meeting place. Her laughter wakes him from an unhappy dream about Nastasya Filippovna. They talk for a long time about the letters Aglaya has received, in which Nastasya Filippovna writes that she herself is in love with Aglaya and passionately beseeches her to marry Myshkin. Aglaya interprets this as evidence that Nastasya Filippovna is in love with him herself, and demands that Myshkin explain his feelings toward her. Myshkin replies that Nastasya Filippovna is insane, that he only feels profound compassion and is not in love with her, but admits that he has come to Pavlovsk for her sake. Aglaya becomes angry, demands that he throw the letters back in her face, and storms off. Myshkin reads the letters with dread, and later that day Nastasya Filippovna herself appears to him, asking desperately if he is happy, and telling him she is going away and will not write any more letters. Rogozhin escorts her.

=== Part 4 ===
It is clear to Lizaveta Prokofyevna and General Epanchin that their daughter is in love with the Prince, but Aglaya denies this and angrily dismisses talk of marriage. She continues to mock and reproach him, often in front of others, and lets slip that, as far as she is concerned, the problem of Nastasya Filippovna is yet to be resolved. Myshkin himself merely experiences an uncomplicated joy in her presence and is mortified when she appears to be angry with him. Lizaveta Prokofyevna feels it is time to introduce the Prince to their aristocratic circle and a dinner party is arranged for this purpose, to be attended by a number of eminent persons. Aglaya, who does not share her parents' respect for these people and is afraid that Myshkin's eccentricity will not meet with their approval, tries to tell him how to behave, but ends by sarcastically telling him to be as eccentric as he likes, and to be sure to wave his arms about when he is pontificating on some high-minded subject and break her mother's priceless Chinese vase. Feeling her anxiety, Myshkin too becomes extremely anxious, but he tells her that it is nothing compared to the joy he feels in her company. He tries to approach the subject of Nastasya Filippovna again, but she silences him and hurriedly leaves.

For a while the dinner party proceeds smoothly. Inexperienced in the ways of the aristocracy, Myshkin is deeply impressed by the elegance and good humour of the company, unsuspicious of its superficiality. It turns out that one of those present—Ivan Petrovich—is a relative of his beloved benefactor Pavlishchev, and the Prince becomes extraordinarily enthusiastic. But when Ivan Petrovich mentions that Pavlishchev ended by giving up everything and going over to the Roman Catholic Church, Myshkin is horrified. He launches unexpectedly into an anti-Catholic tirade, claiming that it preaches the Antichrist and in its quest for political supremacy has given birth to Atheism. Everyone present is shocked and several attempts are made to stop or divert him, but he only becomes more animated. At the height of his fervor he begins waving his arms about and knocks over the priceless Chinese vase, smashing it to pieces. As Myshkin emerges from his profound astonishment, the general horror turns to amusement and concern for his health. But it is only temporary, and he soon begins another spontaneous discourse, this time on the subject of the aristocracy in Russia, once again becoming oblivious to all attempts to quell his ardour. The speech is only brought to an end by the onset of an epileptic seizure: Aglaya, deeply distressed, catches him in her arms as he falls. He is taken home, having left a decidedly negative impression on the guests.

The next day Ippolit visits the Prince to inform him that he and others (such as Lebedyev and Ganya) have been intriguing against him, and have been unsettling Aglaya with talk of Nastasya Filippovna. Ippolit has arranged, at Aglaya's request and with Rogozhin's help, a meeting between the two women. That evening Aglaya, having left her home in secret, calls for the Prince. They proceed in silence to the appointed meeting place, where both Nastasya Filippovna and Rogozhin are already present. It soon becomes apparent that Aglaya has not come there to discuss anything, but to chastise and humiliate Nastasya Filippovna, and a bitter exchange of accusations and insults ensues. Nastasya Filippovna orders Rogozhin to leave and hysterically demands of Myshkin that he stay with her. Myshkin, once again torn by her suffering, is unable to deny her and reproaches Aglaya for her attack. Aglaya looks at him with pain and hatred, and runs off. He goes after her but Nastasya Filippovna stops him desperately and then faints. Myshkin stays with her.

In accordance with Nastasya Filippovna's wish, she and the Prince become engaged. Public opinion is highly critical of Myshkin's actions toward Aglaya, and the Epanchins break off all relations with him. He tries to explain to Yevgeny Pavlovich that Nastasya Filippovna is a broken soul, that he must stay with her or she will probably die, and that Aglaya will understand if he is only allowed to talk to her. Yevgeny Pavlovich refuses to facilitate any contact between them and suspects that Myshkin himself is mad.

On the day of the wedding, a beautifully attired Nastasya Filippovna is met by Keller and Burdovsky, who are to escort her to the church where Myshkin is waiting. A large crowd has gathered, among whom is Rogozhin. Seeing him, Nastasya Filippovna rushes to him and tells him hysterically to take her away, which Rogozhin loses no time in doing. The Prince, though shaken, is not particularly surprised at this development. For the remainder of the day he calmly fulfills his social obligations to guests and members of the public. The following morning he takes the first train to Petersburg and goes to Rogozhin's house, but he is told by servants that there is no one there. After several hours of fruitless searching, he returns to the hotel he was staying at when he last encountered Rogozhin in Petersburg. Rogozhin appears and asks him to come back to the house. They enter the house in secret and Rogozhin leads him to the dead body of Nastasya Filippovna: he has stabbed her through the heart. The two men keep vigil over the body, which Rogozhin has laid out in his study.

Rogozhin is sentenced to fifteen years hard labor in Siberia. Myshkin goes mad and, through the efforts of Yevgeny Pavlovich, returns to the sanatorium in Switzerland. The Epanchins go abroad and Aglaya elopes with a wealthy, exiled Polish count who later is discovered to be neither wealthy, nor a count, nor an exile—at least, not a political exile—and who, along with a Roman Catholic priest, has turned her against her family.

== Characters ==
=== Major characters ===
Prince Myshkin, the novel's central character, is a young man who has returned to Russia after a long period abroad where he was receiving treatment for epilepsy. The lingering effects of the illness, combined with his innocence and lack of social experience, sometimes create the superficial and completely false impression of mental or psychological deficiency. Most of the other characters at one time or another refer to him disparagingly as an "idiot", but nearly all of them are deeply affected by him. In truth he is highly intelligent, self-aware, intuitive, and empathic. He is someone who has thought deeply about human nature, morality and spirituality, and is capable of expressing those thoughts with great clarity.

Nastasya Filippovna, the main female protagonist, is darkly beautiful, intelligent, fierce, and mocking. She is an intimidating figure to most of the other characters. Of noble birth but orphaned at age 7, she was manipulated into a position of sexual servitude by her guardian, the voluptuary Totsky. Her broken innocence and the social perception of disgrace produce an intensely emotional and destructive personality. The Prince is deeply moved by her beauty and her suffering, and despite feeling that she is insane, remains devoted to her. She is torn between Myshkin's compassion and Rogozhin's obsession with her.

Rogózhin (Parfyón Semyónovich), who has just inherited a huge fortune from his merchant father, is madly in love with Nastasya Filippovna, and recklessly abandons himself to pursuing her. He instinctively likes and trusts the Prince when they first meet, but later develops a hatred for him out of jealousy. The character represents passionate, instinctive love, as opposed to Myshkin's Christian love based in compassion.

Agláya Ivánovna is the youngest daughter of Myshkin's distant relative Lizaveta Prokofyevna and her husband, the wealthy and respected General Epanchin. Aglaya is proud, commanding, and impatient, but also full of laughter and innocence. The Prince is particularly drawn to her after his dark times with Nastasya Filippovna and Rogozhin.

Ippolít Teréntyev is a young nihilist intellectual who is in the final stages of tuberculosis and near death. Still full of youthful idealism, he craves love and recognition from others, but their indifference and his own morbid self-obsession lead him to increasing extremes of cynicism and defiance. The character is a "quasi-double" for Myshkin: their circumstances force them to address the same metaphysical questions, but their responses are diametrically opposed.

=== Other characters ===
- Gánya (Gavríl Ardaliónovich) – a capable but extremely vain and avaricious young man, he offers himself in marriage to Nastasya Filippovna, whom he secretly hates, on the promise of riches from Totsky, but she rejects and humiliates him. He also tries to compete with Myshkin for Aglaya's affections. A mediocre man who is resentful of his own lack of originality, Ganya represents love from vanity, and is contrasted with Myshkin and Rogozhin.
- Lébedyev (Lukyán Timoféevich) – a roguish drunkard whose restless curiosity and petty ambition have made him into a kind of repository of social information. He uses this to ingratiate himself with superiors, and to pursue various schemes and intrigues. His unpleasant tendencies are offset to some extent by a mischievous sense of humour, a sharp intellect, and occasional bouts of abject self-condemnation and compassion for others.
- Lizavéta Prokófyevna – Aglaya's mother and Myshkin's distant relative. Though child-like in the spontaneity of her emotions, she is strong-willed and imperious, particularly about matters of honour and morality. Myshkin considers her and Aglaya to be very alike.
- General Iván Fyódorovich Epanchín – Aglaya's father.
- Alexándra Ivánovna – Aglaya's sister, eldest daughter of Ivan Fyodorovich and Lizaveta Prokofyevna.
- Adelaída Ivánovna – Aglaya's sister, second daughter of Ivan Fyodorovich and Lizaveta Prokofyevna.
- Prince Shch. (or Prince S) – a "liberal" aristocrat who marries Adelaida Ivanovna.
- Yevgény Pávlovich Radómsky – a handsome military officer who is a close friend of the Epanchins. His rumoured interest in Aglaya leads Nastasya Filippovna (who wants to bring Aglaya and the Prince together) to publicly expose some unsavoury aspects of his background. Despite this, he and the Prince become friends and have a mutual respect for each other's intelligence.
- Afanásy Ivánovich Tótsky – a wealthy aristocrat and libertine, a friend and business associate of General Epanchin. He is the former guardian of Nastasya Filippovna.
- General Ívolgin (Ardalión Alexándrovich) – Ganya's father, a highly honourable man, but a drunkard and mythomaniac. He is the subject of a subplot in Part 4, involving the theft of 400 rubles from Lebedyev.
- Nína Alexándrovna – General Ivolgin's long-suffering wife, and mother of Ganya, Varya and Kolya.
- Kólya (Nikolay Ardaliónovich) – Ganya's younger brother. He is a friend of Ippolit's, and also becomes a friend and confidant of the Prince.
- Várya (Varvára Ardaliónovna) – Ganya's sister.
- Iván Petróvich Ptítsyn – Ganya's friend and Varya's husband.
- Ferdýshchenko – a lodger with the Ivolgins, a drunkard whose inappropriate manner and coarse but cutting wit is valued by Nastasya Filippovna.
- Antíp Burdóvsky – a young man who mistakenly thinks he is the illegitimate son of Myshkin's benefactor Pavlishchev. He begins by aggressively demanding money from the Prince, but later becomes an admirer.
- Kéller – a retired Lieutenant, initially one of Rogozhin's crew, he becomes an associate of Ippolit and Burdovsky and writes a slanderous article about the Prince. He later develops a great admiration for the Prince and seeks to defend him.
- Doktorenko – Lebedyev's nephew, a nihilist who, along with Ippolit, leads Burdovsky's attack on the Prince.
- Véra Lukyánovna – Lebedyev's daughter.

== Themes ==
=== Atheism and Christianity in Russia ===
A dialogue between the intimately related themes of atheism and Christian faith (meaning, for Dostoevsky, Russian Orthodoxy) pervades the entire novel. Dostoevsky's personal image of Christian faith, formed prior to his philosophical engagement with Orthodoxy but never abandoned, was one that emphasized the human need for belief in the immortality of the soul, and identified Christ with ideals of "beauty, truth, brotherhood and Russia". The character of Prince Myshkin was originally intended to be an embodiment of this "lofty (Russian) Christian idea". With the character's immersion in the increasingly materialistic and atheistic world of late 19th century Russia, the idea is constantly being elaborated, tested in every scene and against every other character. However, Myshkin's Christianity is not a doctrine or a set of beliefs but is something that he lives spontaneously in his relations with all others. Whenever he appears "hierarchical barriers between people suddenly become penetrable, an inner contact is formed between them... His personality possesses the peculiar capacity to relativize everything that disunifies people and imparts a false seriousness to life."

The young nihilist Ippolit Terentyev is the character that provides the most coherent articulation of the atheist challenge to Myshkin's worldview, most notably in the long essay "An Essential Explanation" which he reads to the gathering at the Prince's birthday celebration in part 3 of the novel. Here he picks up a motif first touched upon early in part 2, in a dialogue between Myshkin and Rogozhin, when they are contemplating the copy of Holbein's Dead Christ in Rogozhin's house, and Rogozhin confesses that the painting is eroding his faith. Holbein's painting held a particular significance for Dostoevsky because he saw in it his own impulse "to confront Christian faith with everything that negated it". The character of Ippolit argues that the painting, which depicts with unflinching realism the tortured, already putrefying corpse of Christ within the tomb, represents the triumph of blind nature over the vision of immortality in God that Christ's existence on Earth signified. He is unable to share Myshkin's intuition of the harmonious unity of all Being, an intuition evoked most intensely earlier in the novel in a description of the pre-epileptic aura. Consequently, the inexorable laws of nature appear to Ippolit as something monstrous, particularly in the light of his own approaching death from tuberculosis:

"It is as though this painting were the means by which this idea of a dark, brazen and senseless eternal force, to which everything is subordinate, is expressed... I remember someone taking me by the arm, a candle in his hands, and showing me some sort of enormous and repulsive tarantula, assuring me that this was that same dark, blind and all-powerful creature, and laughing at my indignation."

The Prince does not directly engage with Ippolit's atheistic arguments, as a religious ideologist might: rather, he recognizes Ippolit as a kindred spirit, and empathetically perceives his youthful struggle with both his own inner negation and the cruelty, irony, and indifference of the world around him.

==== Catholicism ====
The Prince's Christianity, insofar as he is the embodiment of the "Russian Christian idea", explicitly excludes Roman Catholicism. His unexpected tirade at the Epanchins' dinner party is based in unequivocal assertions that Roman Catholicism is "an unChristian faith", that it preaches the Antichrist, and that its appropriation and distortion of Christ's teaching into a basis for the attainment of political supremacy has given birth to atheism. The Roman Catholic Church, he claims, is merely a continuation of the Western Roman Empire: cynically exploiting the person and teaching of Christ it has installed itself on the earthly throne and taken up the sword to entrench and expand its power. This is a betrayal of the true teaching of Christ, a teaching that transcends the lust for earthly power (Satan's third temptation to Christ), and speaks directly to the individual's and the people's highest emotions—those that spring from what Myshkin calls "spiritual thirst". Atheism and socialism are a reaction, born of profound disillusionment, to the Roman Catholic Church's defilement of its own moral and spiritual authority.

It is because of this "spiritual thirst" that Myshkin is so uncompromisingly scathing about the influence of Roman Catholicism and atheism in Russia. The Russian, he claims, not only feels this thirst with great urgency, but is, by virtue of it, particularly susceptible to false faiths:

"In our country if a man goes over to Catholicism, he unfailingly becomes a Jesuit, and one of the most clandestine sort, at that; if he becomes an atheist, he will at once begin to demand the eradication of belief in God by coercion, that is, by the sword... It is not from vanity alone, not from mere sordid vain emotions that Russian atheists and Russian Jesuits proceed, but from a spiritual pain, a spiritual thirst, a yearning for something more exalted, for a firm shore, a motherland in which they have ceased to believe..."

The theme of the maleficent influence of Catholicism on the Russian soul is expressed, in a less obvious and polemical way, through the character of Aglaya Epanchin. Passionate and idealistic, like "the Russian" alluded to in the anti-Catholic diatribe, Aglaya struggles with the ennui of middle class mediocrity and hates the moral vacuity of the aristocracy to whom her parents kowtow. Her "yearning for the exalted" has attracted her to militant Catholicism, and in the Prince's devotion to Nastasya Filippovna she sees the heroism of a Crusader-Knight abandoning everything to go in to battle for his Christian ideal. She is deeply angry when, instead of "defending himself triumphantly" against his enemies (Ippolit and his nihilist friends), he tries to make peace with them and offers assistance. Aglaya's tendency to misinterpret Myshkin's motives leads to fractures in what is otherwise a blossoming of innocent love. When the Epanchins go abroad after the final catastrophe, Aglaya, under the influence of a Roman Catholic priest, abandons her family and elopes with a Polish count.

=== Innocence and guilt ===
In his notes Dostoevsky distinguishes the Prince from other characters of the virtuous type in fiction (such as Don Quixote and Pickwick) by emphasizing innocence rather than comicality. In one sense Myshkin's innocence is an instrument of satire since it brings in to sharp relief the corruption and egocentricity of those around him. But his innocence is serious rather than comical, and he has a deeper insight into the psychology of human beings in general by assuming its presence in everyone else, even as they laugh at him, or try to deceive and exploit him. Examples of this combination of innocence and insight can be found in Myshkin's interactions with virtually all the other characters. He explains it himself in an episode with the roguish but 'honourable' Keller, who has confessed that he has sought the Prince out for motives that are simultaneously noble (he wants spiritual guidance) and mercenary (he wants to borrow a large sum of money from him). The Prince guesses that he has come to borrow money before he has even mentioned it, and unassumingly engages him in a conversation about the psychological oddity of 'double thoughts':

Two thoughts coincided, that very often happens... I think it's a bad thing and, you know, Keller, I reproach myself most of all for it. What you told me just now could have been about me. I've even sometimes thought that all human beings are like that, because it's terribly difficult to fight those double thoughts... At any rate, I am not your judge... You used cunning to coax money out of me by means of tears, but you yourself swear that your confession had a different aim, a noble one; as for the money, you need it to go on a drinking spree, don't you? And after such a confession that's weakness of course. But how can one give up drinking sprees in a single moment? It's impossible. So what is to be done? It is best to leave it to your own conscience, what do you think?

Aglaya Ivanovna, despite her occasional fury at his apparent passivity, understands this aspect of Myshkin's innocence, and expresses it in their conversation at the green seat when she speaks of the "two parts of the mind: one that's important and one that's not important".

Nastasya Filippovna is a character who embodies the internal struggle between innocence and guilt. Isolated and sexually exploited by Totsky from the age of sixteen, Nastasya Filippovna has inwardly embraced her social stigmatization as a corrupted 'fallen woman', but this conviction is intimately bound to its opposite—the victimized child's sense of a broken innocence that longs for vindication. The combination produces a cynical and destructive outer persona, which disguises a fragile and deeply hurt inner being. When the Prince speaks to her, he addresses only this inner being, and in him she sees and hears the long dreamt-of affirmation of her innocence. But the self-destructive voice of her guilt, so intimately bound to the longing for innocence, does not disappear as a result, and constantly reasserts itself. Myshkin divines that in her constant reiteration of her shame there is a "dreadful, unnatural pleasure, as if it were a revenge on someone." Its principal outward form is the repeated choice to submit herself to Rogozhin's obsession with her, knowing that its end result will almost certainly be her own death.

The theme of the intrapsychic struggle between innocence and guilt is manifested, in idiosyncratic forms, in many of the characters in the novel. The character of General Ivolgin, for example, constantly tells outrageous lies, but to those who understand him (such as Myshkin, Lebedyev, and Kolya) he is the noblest and most honest of men. He commits a theft out of weakness, but is so overcome by shame that it helps precipitate a stroke. Lebedyev is constantly plotting and swindling, but he is also deeply religious, and is periodically overcome by paroxysms of guilt-ridden self-loathing. Myshkin himself has a strong tendency to feel ashamed of his own thoughts and actions. The fact that Rogozhin reaches the point of attacking him with a knife is something for which he feels himself to be equally guilty because his own half-conscious suspicions were the same as Rogozhin's half-conscious impulse. When Burdovsky, who has unceremoniously demanded money from him on the basis of a falsehood, gets increasingly insulted by his attempts to offer assistance, Myshkin reproaches himself for his own clumsiness and lack of tact.

=== Autobiographical themes ===
==== Capital punishment ====
In 1849, Dostoevsky was sentenced to execution by firing squad for his part in the activities of the Petrashevsky Circle. Shortly after the period of interrogation and trial, he and his fellow prisoners were taken, without warning, to Semyonovsky Square where the sentence of death was read out over them. The first three prisoners were tied to stakes facing the firing squad: Dostoevsky was among the next in line. Just as the first shots were about to be fired, a message arrived from the Tsar commuting the sentences to hard labor in Siberia.

The experience had a profound effect on Dostoevsky, and in Part 1 of The Idiot (written twenty years after the event) the character of Prince Myshkin repeatedly speaks in depth on the subject of capital punishment. On one occasion, conversing with the Epanchin women, he recounts an anecdote that exactly mirrors Dostoevsky's own experience. A man of 27, who had committed a political offence, was taken to the scaffold with his comrades, where a death sentence by firing squad was read out to them. Twenty minutes later, with all the preparations for the execution having been completed, they were unexpectedly reprieved, but for those twenty minutes the man lived with the complete certainty that he was soon to face sudden death. According to this man, the mind recoils so powerfully against the reality of its imminent death that the experience of time itself is radically altered. The mind speeds up exponentially as the moment approaches, causing time to expand correspondingly, even reaching the point where the tiny amount of conventional human time left is experienced inwardly as unbearable in its enormity. Eventually, the man said, he "longed to be shot quickly".

The subject of capital punishment first comes up earlier in Part 1, when the Prince is waiting with a servant for General Epanchin to appear. Engaging the servant in conversation, the Prince tells the harrowing story of an execution by guillotine that he recently witnessed in France. He concludes the description with his own reflections on the horror of death by execution:

... the worst, most violent pain lies not in injuries, but in the fact that you know for certain that within the space of an hour, then ten minutes, then half a minute, then now, right at this moment—your soul will fly out of your body, and you'll no longer be a human being, and that this is certain; the main thing is that it is certain. When you put your head right under the guillotine and hear it sliding above your head, it's that quarter of a second that's most terrible of all... Who can say that human nature is able to endure such a thing without going mad? Why such mockery—ugly, superfluous, futile? Perhaps the man exists to whom his sentence has been read out, has been allowed to suffer, and then been told: "off you go, you've been pardoned". A man like that could tell us perhaps. Such suffering and terror were what Christ spoke of. No, a human being should not be treated like that!

Later, when he is conversing with the Epanchin sisters, the Prince suggests to Adelaida, who has asked him for a subject to paint, that she paint the face of a condemned man a minute before the guillotine falls. He carefully explains his reasons for the suggestion, enters in to the emotions and thoughts of the condemned man, and describes in meticulous detail what the painting should depict. In this description Myshkin takes the contemplation of the condemned man's inward experience of time a step further and asks: what would the mind be experiencing in the last tenth of a second, as it hears the iron blade sliding above? And what would be experienced if, as some argue, the mind continues for some time after the head has been cut off? The Prince breaks off without answering, but the implication is that the victim experiences these "moments" of unspeakable terror as vast stretches of time.

In part 2, the usually comical character of Lebedyev also considers the horror of the moment before execution. In the midst of a heated exchange with his nihilist nephew he expresses deep compassion for the soul of the Countess du Barry, who died in terror on the guillotine after pleading for her life with the executioner.

==== Epilepsy ====
For much of his adult life Dostoevsky suffered from an unusual and at times extremely debilitating form of temporal lobe epilepsy. In 1867 (the same year he began work on The Idiot) he wrote to his doctor: "this epilepsy will end up by carrying me off... My memory has grown completely dim. I don't recognize people anymore... I'm afraid of going mad or falling into idiocy". Dostoevsky's attacks were preceded by a brief period of intense joyous mystical experience which he described as being worth years of his life, or perhaps even his whole life. A similar illness plays an important part in the characterization of Prince Myshkin, partly because the severity of the condition and its after-effects (disorientation, amnesia, aphasia, among others) contributes significantly to the myth of the character's "idiocy".

Although Myshkin himself is completely aware that he is not an "idiot" in any pejorative sense, he sometimes concedes the aptness of the word in relation to his mental state during particularly severe attacks. He occasionally makes reference to the pre-narrative period prior to his confinement in a Swiss sanatorium, when the symptoms were chronic and he really was "almost an idiot". Paradoxically, it is also clear that aspects of the disease are intimately connected to a profound intensification of his mental faculties, and are a significant cause of the development of his higher spiritual preoccupations:

...there was a certain stage almost immediately before the fit itself when, amidst the sadness, the mental darkness, the pressure, his brain suddenly seemed to burst into flame, and with an extraordinary jolt all his vital forces seemed to be tensed together. The sensation of life and of self-awareness increased tenfold at those moments... The mind, the heart were flooded with an extraordinary light; all his unrest, all his doubts, all his anxieties were resolved into a kind of higher calm, full of a serene, harmonious joy and hope.

Although for Myshkin these moments represented an intimation of the highest truth, he also knew that "stupefaction, mental darkness, idiocy stood before him as the consequence of these 'highest moments'." At the end of the novel, after Rogozhin has murdered Nastasya Filippovna, the Prince appears to descend completely into this darkness.

=== Mortality ===
The consciousness of the inevitability of death and the effect that this consciousness has on the living soul is a recurring theme in the novel. A number of characters are shaped, each according to the nature of their own self-consciousness, by their proximity to death. Most notable in this respect are Prince Myshkin, Ippolit, Nastasya Filippovna and Rogozhin.

The anecdote of the man reprieved from execution is an illustration, drawn from the author's own experience, of the extraordinary value of life as revealed in the moment of imminent death. The most terrible realization for the condemned man, according to Myshkin, is that of a wasted life, and he is consumed by the desperate desire for another chance. After his reprieve, the man vows to live every moment of life conscious of its infinite value (although he confesses to failing to fulfil the vow). Through his own emergence from a prolonged period on the brink of derangement, unconsciousness and death, the Prince himself has awoken to the joyous wonder of life, and all his words, moral choices and relations with others are guided by this fundamental insight. Joseph Frank, drawing on the theology of Albert Schweitzer, places the Prince's insight in the context of "the eschatological tension that is the soul of the primitive Christian ethic, whose doctrine of Agape was conceived in the same perspective of the imminent end of time." Myshkin asserts that in the ecstatic moment of the pre-epileptic aura he is able to comprehend the extraordinary phrase (from the Book of Revelation, 10:6): "there shall be time no longer".

Like Myshkin, Ippolit is haunted by death and has a similar reverence for the beauty and mystery of life, but his self-absorbed atheist-nihilist worldview pushes him toward opposite conclusions. While the Prince's worldview reflects the birth of his faith in a higher world-harmony, Ippolit's concern with death develops into a metaphysical resentment of nature's omnipotence, her utter indifference to human suffering in general and to his own suffering in particular. In the character of Ippolit, Dostoevsky again considers the terrible dilemma of the condemned man. Ippolit speaks of his illness as a "death sentence" and of himself as "a man condemned to death". In his "Essential Explanation" he argues passionately that meaningful action is impossible when one knows one is going to die. The living soul absolutely requires that its future be open, not pre-determined, and it rebels irrepressibly against the imposition of a definite end. Ippolit conceives the idea of suicide as the only way left to him of asserting his will in the face of nature's death sentence.

== Style ==
=== Temporality ===
Dostoevsky's notebooks for The Idiot during the time of its serial publication clearly indicate that he never knew what successive installments would contain. The method of testing the central idea in a series of extreme situations, allowing each character to freely respond, meant that there could be no pre-determined development of either plot or character: the author himself was just as surprised as the characters at what happened or didn't happen. This uncontrived approach to writing becomes, in the novel, a depiction of what Morson calls "the openness of time". In the usual novel, the apparently free acts of the characters are an illusion as they only serve to bring about a future that has been contrived by the author. But in real life, even with a belief in determinism or preordination, the subject always assumes its freedom and acts as though the future were unwritten. Dostoevsky's extemporaneous approach helped facilitate the representation of the actual position of human subjectivity, as an open field of possibility where the will is free at all times, despite the apparent necessity of cause and effect. According to Mikhail Bakhtin, "Dostoevsky always represents a person on the threshold of a final decision, at a moment of crisis, at an unfinalizable—and unpredeterminable—turning point for their soul."

=== Carnivalization ===
Bakhtin argues that Dostoevsky always wrote in opposition to modern tendencies toward the "reification of man"—the turning of human beings into objects (scientific, economic, social, etc.), enclosing them in an alien web of definition and causation, robbing them of freedom and responsibility. "Carnivalization" is a term used by Bakhtin to describe the techniques Dostoevsky uses to disarm this increasingly ubiquitous enemy and make true intersubjective dialogue possible. The concept suggests an ethos where normal hierarchies, social roles, proper behaviors and assumed truths are subverted in favor of the "joyful relativity" of free participation in the festival. In The Idiot, everything revolves around the two central carnival figures of the "idiot" and the "madwoman", and consequently "all of life is carnivalized, turned into a 'world inside out': traditional plot situations radically change their meaning, there develops a dynamic, carnivalistic play of sharp contrasts, unexpected shifts and changes". Prince Myshkin and Nastasya Filippovna are characters that inherently elude conventional social definition, or—as Bakhtin puts it—anything that might limit their "pure humanness". The carnival atmosphere that develops around them in each situation and dialogue ("bright and joyous" in Myshkin's case, "dark and infernal" in Nastasya Filippovna's) allows Dostoevsky to "expose a different side of life to himself and to the reader, to spy upon and depict in that life certain new, unknown depths and possibilities."

=== Polyphony ===
Carnivalization helps generate the artistic phenomenon that Bakhtin felt was unique to Dostoevsky in literature: Polyphony. Analogous to musical polyphony, literary polyphony is the simultaneous presence of multiple independent voices, each with its own truth and validity, but always coincident with other voices, affecting them and being affected by them. Bakhtin defines it as "the event of interaction between autonomous and internally unfinalized consciousnesses". In the polyphonic novel each character's voice speaks for itself: the narrator and even the author are present in the narrative merely as one voice among others. No voice has a privileged authority, and all have a form that inherently expresses engagement with other voices. Thus events unfold dialogically, as a consequence of the interaction between discrete voices, not as a consequence of authorial design:

What unfolds... is not a multitude of characters and fates in a single objective world, illuminated by a single authorial consciousness; rather a plurality of consciousnesses, with equal rights and each with its own world, combine but are not merged in the unity of the event. Dostoevsky's major heroes are, by the very nature of his creative design, not only objects of authorial discourse but also subjects of their own directly signifying discourse.

=== Narrator and author ===
Despite the appearance of omniscience, the narrator of The Idiot is given a distinct voice like any other character, and often conveys only a partial understanding of the events he is describing. It is the voice of a highly perceptive and meticulous reporter of the facts, who has, despite this objectivity, a particular perspective on what he is reporting, occasionally even lapsing into pontification. At one point in his notes Dostoevsky admonishes himself to "write more concisely: only the facts. Write in the sense of people say..." The narrator's resort to 'the facts' has the effect of "placing the facts on the side of rumor and mystery rather than on the side of description and explanation." The narrator is thus not omniscient, but a particular kind of insightful but limited spectator, and in the end he openly admits to the reader that the Prince's behaviour is inexplicable to him. According to Frank, "this limitation of the narrator is part of Dostoevsky's effort to present Myshkin's behaviour as transcending all the categories of worldly moral-social experience."

For Bakhtin the narrator's voice is another participant, albeit of a special kind, in the "great dialogue" that constitutes the Dostoevsky novel. All voices, all ideas, once they enter the world of the novel, take on an imaginary form that positions them in dialogical relationship with the other voices and ideas. In this sense, even the author's own ideological positions, when they are expressed through the narrator, or Myshkin, or Lebedyev, "become thoroughly dialogized and enter the great dialogue of the novel on completely equal terms with the other idea-images". Since the most important thing for Dostoevsky in the construction of his novels is the dialogic interaction of a multiplicity of voices, the author's discourse "cannot encompass the hero and his word on all sides, cannot lock in and finalize him from without. It can only address itself to him."

== Reception ==
Critical reception of The Idiot at the time of its publication in Russia was almost uniformly negative. This was partly because a majority of the reviewers considered themselves to be opposed to Dostoevsky's "conservatism", and wished to discredit the book's supposed political intentions. However the chief criticism, among both reviewers and general readers, was in the "fantasticality" of the characters. The radical critic D.I. Minaev wrote: "People meet, fall in love, slap each other's face—and all at the author's first whim, without any artistic truth." V.P. Burenin, a liberal, described the novel's presentation of the younger generation as "the purest fruit of the writer's subjective fancy" and the novel as a whole as "a belletristic compilation, concocted from a multitude of absurd personages and events, without any concern for any kind of artistic objectivity." Leading radical critic Mikhail Saltykov-Schedrin approved of Dostoevsky's attempt to depict the genuinely good man, but castigated him for his scurrilous treatment of "the very people whose efforts are directed at the very objective apparently pursued by him... On the one hand there appear characters full of life and truth, but on the other, some kind of mysterious puppets hopping about as though in a dream..." Dostoevsky responded to Maykov's reports of the prevailing 'fantastical' criticisms with an unashamed characterization of his literary philosophy as "fantastic realism", and claimed that it was far more real, taking contemporary developments in Russia in to consideration, than the so-called realism of his detractors, and could even be used to predict future events.

French and English translations were published in 1887, and a German translation in 1889. European critical response was also largely negative, mainly due to the novel's apparent formlessness and rambling style. Morson notes that critics saw it as "a complete mess, as if it were written extemporaneously, with no overall structure in mind—as, in fact, it was." Typical of the western critics was the introduction to the first French translation which, while praising the energetic style and characterization, notes that "they are enveloped in a fantastic mist and get lost in innumerable digressions."

Prominent modern critics acknowledge the novel's apparent structural deficiencies, but also point out that the author was aware of them himself, and that they were perhaps a natural consequence of the experimental approach toward the central idea. Joseph Frank has called The Idiot "perhaps the most original of Dostoevsky's great novels, and certainly the most artistically uneven of them all," but he also wondered how it was that the novel "triumphed so effortlessly over the inconsistencies and awkwardnesses of its structure." Gary Saul Morson observes that "The Idiot brings to mind the old saw about how, according to the laws of physics, bumblebees should be unable to fly, but bumblebees, not knowing physics, go on flying anyway."

The twentieth century Russian literary critic Mikhail Bakhtin regarded the structural asymmetry and unpredictability of plot development, as well as the perceived "fantasticality" of the characters, not as any sort of deficiency, but as entirely consistent with Dostoevsky's unique and groundbreaking literary method. Bakhtin saw Dostoevsky as the preeminent exemplar of the Carnivalesque in literature, and as the inventor of the polyphonic novel. A literary approach that incorporates carnivalisation and polyphony in Bakhtin's sense precludes any sort of conventionally recognizable structure or predictable pattern of plot development.

== English translations ==
Since The Idiot was first published in Russian, there have been a number of translations into English, including those by:

- Frederick Whishaw (1887)
- Constance Garnett (1913)
  - Revised by Anna Brailovsky (2003)
- Eva Martin (1915)
- David Magarshack (1955)
- John W. Strahan (1965)
- Henry Carlisle and Olga Andreyeva Carlisle (1980)
- Alan Myers (1992)
- Richard Pevear and Larissa Volokhonsky (2002)
- David McDuff (2004)
- Ignat Avsey (2010)
- Michael R. Katz (2026)

The Constance Garnett translation was for many years accepted as the definitive English translation, but more recently it has come under criticism for being dated. The Garnett translation, however, still remains widely available because it is now in the public domain. Some writers, such as Anna Brailovsky, have based their translations on Garnett's. Since the 1990s, new English translations have appeared that have made the novel more accessible to English readers. The Oxford Guide to Literature in English Translation (2000) states that the Alan Myers version is the "best version currently available". Since then, however, new translations by David McDuff and Pevear & Volokhonsky have also been well received.

== Adaptations ==
Wandering Souls (1921), directed by Carl Froelich

- Several filmmakers have produced adaptations of the novel, among them Wandering Souls (Carl Froelich; 1921) L'idiot (Georges Lampin; 1946), a 1951 version by Akira Kurosawa, a 1958 version by Russian director Ivan Pyryev, and a 1992 Hindi version by Mani Kaul. An unfinished silent version by Sergei Eisenstein was once shown in the Soviet Union, the last reel "lost" in what some claim to be a disagreement with Joseph Stalin on the ending. Andrei Tarkovsky aspired to eventually produce a film adaptation of The Idiot, but was constantly obfuscated by Soviet state censors. He was contracted by Mosfilm to write a screenplay in 1983, but production halted after he announced his intent never to return to the Soviet Union. Tarkovsky's other films, such as Stalker, incorporate many themes from The Idiot.
- In 1966, the British Broadcasting Corporation screened a five-part adaptation of The Idiot on BBC-2. It was directed by Alan Bridges and starred David Buck as Prince Myshkin and Adrienne Corri as Nastasia.
- In 2003, Russian State Television Network VGTRK produced a 10-part, 8-hour mini-series of the work, directed by Vladimir Bortko for Telekanal Rossiya, which is available with English subtitles.
- BBC Radio 7 broadcast a 4-episode adaptation of The Idiot entitled Fyodor Dostoevsky's The Idiot, in June 2010. It starred Paul Rhys as Prince Myshkin.
- Mieczysław Weinberg adapted the novel into a Russian-language opera.
- John Eaton adapted the novel into a television opera, Myshkin, in 1974. It was produced by the Indiana University School of Music and WTIU.
- The Royal National Theatre staged an adaptation of the novel by English theatre director Katie Mitchell. It was titled ...some trace of her and premiered at the Cottesloe (later Dorfman) Theatre in July 2008, starring Ben Whishaw as Myshkin and Hattie Morahan as Nastasya.

== Sources ==
- Bakhtin, Mikhail (1984). Problems of Dostoevsky's Poetics. University of Minnesota Press. ISBN 0816612285. See also Problems of Dostoevsky's Poetics in Wikipedia.
- Dostoevsky, Fyodor (2004). The Idiot. Translated by McDuff, David. Penguin Classics. ISBN 9780140447927.
- Frank, Joseph (2010). Dostoevsky: A Writer in His Time. Princeton University Press. ISBN 9780691128191.
- Mills Todd III, William (2004). Introduction to The Idiot by F.D. Penguin Classics. ISBN 9780140447927.
- Morson, Gary Saul (2009). "Return to Process: The Unfolding of The Idiot". New Literary History. 40 (4): 843–865. doi:10.1353/nlh.0.0114. JSTOR 40666450.
- Morson, Gary Saul (June 2018). "'The Idiot' savant". The New Criterion. 36 (10).
- Terras, Victor (1990). The Idiot: An Interpretation. Boston: Twayne Publishers.
