= Marguerite Frank =

American-French mathematician (1927–2024)

Marguerite Straus Frank
- Born: September 8, 1927; Paris, France
- Died: December 11, 2024 (aged 97); Palo Alto, California, U.S.
- Education: University of Toronto; Harvard University
- Known for: Lie algebra Mathematical programming
- Spouse: Joseph Frank (m. 1953; died 2013)
- Scientific career
- Fields: Mathematics
- Thesis: New Simple Lie Algebras (1956)
- Doctoral advisor: Abraham Adrian Albert

Marguerite Josephine Straus Frank (September 8, 1927 – December 11, 2024) was a French-American mathematician who was a pioneer in convex optimization theory and mathematical programming.

== Education ==
After attending secondary schooling in Paris and Toronto, Frank contributed largely to the fields of transportation theory and Lie algebras, which later became the topic of her PhD thesis, New Simple Lie Algebras. She was one of the first female PhD students in mathematics at Harvard University, completing her dissertation in 1956, with Abraham Adrian Albert as her advisor.

== Contributions ==
Together with Philip Wolfe in 1956 at Princeton, she invented the Frank–Wolfe algorithm, an iterative optimization method for general constrained non-linear problems.

== Personal life ==
Marguerite Frank was born in France and migrated to U.S. during the war in 1939. She was married to Joseph Frank from 1953 until his death in 2013. He was a professor of literature at Stanford and an author of widely acclaimed critical biography of Dostoevsky. Frank died on December 11, 2024, at the age of 97.

== Selected publications ==
- Frank, M (1954). "A New Class of Simple Lie Algebras". Proceedings of the National Academy of Sciences. 40 (8): 713–719. Bibcode:1954PNAS...40..713S. doi:10.1073/pnas.40.8.713. PMC 534147. PMID 16589544.
- Frank, M.; Wolfe, P. (1956). "An algorithm for quadratic programming". Naval Research Logistics Quarterly. 3 (1–2): 95–110. doi:10.1002/nav.3800030109.
- Frank, M. (1964). "Two New Classes of Simple Lie Algebras". Transactions of the American Mathematical Society. 112 (3): 456–482. doi:10.2307/1994156. JSTOR 1994156.
- Frank, M. (1973). "A New Simple Lie Algebra of Characteristic Three". Proceedings of the American Mathematical Society. 38 (1): 43–46. doi:10.2307/2038767. JSTOR 2038767.
- Frank, M. (1981). "The Braess paradox". Mathematical Programming. 20: 283–302. doi:10.1007/BF01589354. S2CID 206800589.
- Frank, M.; Mladineo, R. H. (1993). "Computer generation of network cost from one link's equilibrium data". Annals of Operations Research. 44 (3): 261. doi:10.1007/BF02072642. S2CID 33907141.
