= Zemfira Tsakhilova =

Soviet and Russian actress and teacher

- Born: Zemfira Avramovna Tsakhilova; April 24, 1943 (age 82); Alagir, Russian SFSR, Soviet Union
- Citizenship: Soviet Union → Russia
- Occupation: Actress
- Years active: 1966–present
- Spouse: Georgy Tsagolov
- Children: 3

Zemfira Avramovna Tsakhilova (Russian: Земфи́ра Авра́мовна Цахи́лова, Ossetian: Цъæхилты Аврамы чызг Земфирæ; born 24 April 1943) is a Soviet and Russian actress and teacher. She is a member of the Board of the Central House of Artists, an Honored Artist of the North Ossetian Autonomous Soviet Socialist Republic and Honored Artist of the Republic of North Ossetia-Alania.

== Biography ==
Tsakhilova was born in the town of Alagir, in North Ossetia-Alania.

In 1966 she graduated from Boris Shchukin Theatre Institute. While studying, she played in the Vakhtangov Theater. Then she worked at Mossovet Theater. At the end of the 60s, the theater team, along with Vadim Beroev and Tatyana Bestayeva was part of the so-called “Ossetian village” - a group of young but already very popular artists.

In the 70s, Tsakhilova left the theater, completely leaving for cinema. From 1966 to 1982, she played more than 30 roles in Soviet films. She had a role in the Hasan Seyidbeyli film “Why are you silent?”, which predetermined the role of the actress - in the future she was often invited to play the roles of beautiful women, representatives southern and eastern peoples of the USSR: for example, her heroines were Moldavian, Azerbaijani, Georgian, Tajik, Romanian, Ossetian, as well as French and in the miniseries Captain Nemo.

In 1993, she founded the Katyusha Center for the Development of Aesthetics and Beauty, a non-profit educational institution for children from 4 to 17 years old.

Her husband is a doctor of economic sciences and an entrepreneur Georgy Tsagolov. They have two sons and a daughter.
