= Prince Myshkin =

Fictional character in Fyodor Dostoevsky's The Idiot

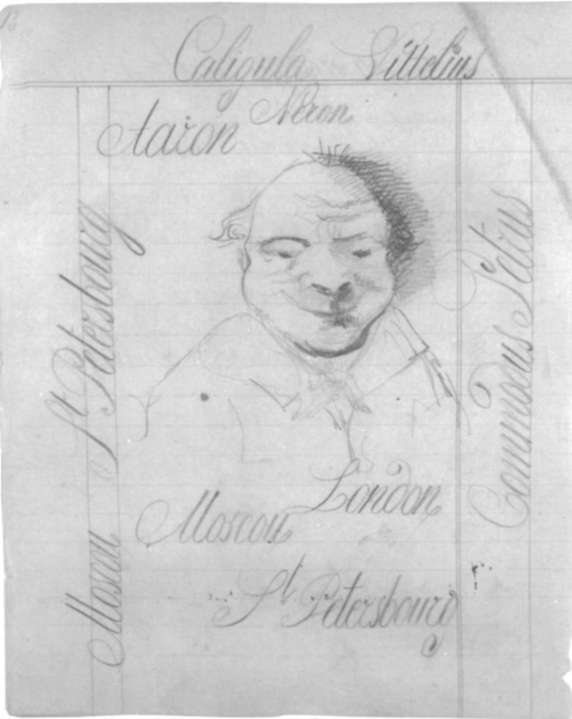
Drawings and handwritten text by F.M. Dostoevsky “The Idiot”

Prince Lev Nikolayevich Myshkin (pre-reform Russian: Левъ Николаевичъ Мышкинъ; post-reform Russian: Лев Николаевич Мышкин, romanized: Lev Nikoláyevich Mýshkin) is the main protagonist of Fyodor Dostoevsky's 1869 novel The Idiot. Dostoevsky wanted to create a character that was "entirely positive... with an absolutely beautiful nature", someone who is truly "Christian". According to Joseph Frank, the character of Prince Myshkin approaches "the extremest incarnation of the Christian ideal of love that humanity can reach in its present form, but he is torn apart by the conflict between the contradictory imperatives of his apocalyptic aspirations and his earthly limitations."

At the beginning of The Idiot, Prince Myshkin has been in Switzerland for the last four years, at a sanatorium for treatment of his epilepsy. At age 26, having recovered his health, and in possession of a legal document suggesting entitlement to a significant inheritance, he returns to Russia. In St. Petersburg, his purity and guilelessness lead many to the false conclusion that he is an "idiot". In fact, he possesses an incisive intellect, deep emotional intelligence, and a wisdom that surpasses all the other characters in the novel.

== Significance of the character to the novel ==
As a polyphonic novel each character in The Idiot has a unique voice and perspective in relation to the action and the other actors. As such every scene is a dramatic convergence of multiple independent voices and perspectives rather than simply being a monological recounting of the event by a narrator. Dostoevsky makes Prince Myshkin a character whose voice is capable of "actively and confidently interfering in the interior dialogue of the other person." He is thus significant not merely to the plot, but to the very consciousness of the individual characters. His insight, compassion, sincerity, candour, disinclination to judge and lack of normal social egoism awaken a responsive consciousness in most of the people with whom he engages, and serve to disrupt the habitual flow of their self-centred thoughts and actions.

=== Nastasya Filippovna ===
—Nastásya Filíppovna Baráshkova (Настасья Филипповна Барашкова)

It is in the character of Nastasya Filippovna that the capacity of the Prince to affect an other's interior dialogue is most marked. Viewed by both society and herself as a "fallen woman" because of years of sexual exploitation by Totsky, Nastasya Filippovna often embraces the sharp-tongued, destructive persona of a cynical courtesan. Myshkin understands that this persona grows out of an internalisation of the abuse she suffered and the unjust moral condemnation consequent upon it, and from their first meeting lets her know that it is not who she really is, and that she is guilty of nothing. In the scene at the Ivolgins' apartment, Nastasya Filippovna mocks Ganya's family (who she knows disapprove of her) and intentionally provokes a scandalous scene, but "Myshkin's voice, intersecting with her internal dialogue in another direction, forces her to abruptly change that tone". She kisses the hand of Ganya's mother and acknowledges the truth of Myshkin's reproach. In the subsequent scandal scene at Nastasya Filippovna's apartment, Myshkin again directly addresses her true, innocent self, prompting her once more to abandon the self-destructive course of the "fallen woman". Although it is only temporary, and Nastasya Filippovna persistently reasserts the negative voice of her guilt in her words and actions, Myshkin remains in her consciousness as the voice of her innocence. Near the end of the novel, when Aglaya Ivanovna (with whom the Prince is in love) has become Nastasya Filippovna's accuser, Myshkin again defends her, telling Aglaya that the accusations are unjust. According to the narrator, Nastasya Filippovna "—though she sometimes behaved with such cynicism and impudence—was really far more modest, soft, and trustful than might have been believed... Myshkin understood this."

=== Rogozhin ===
—Parfyón Semyónovich Rogózhin (pre-reform Russian: Парѳенъ Семеновичъ Рогожинъ; post-reform Russian: Парфён Семёнович Рогожин)

After meeting Myshkin on the train to Petersburg in the opening scene of the book, Rogozhin labels him a yurodivy (holy fool). In the Eastern Orthodox tradition the yurodivy was usually a greatly respected figure. According to Frank, "though the gentlemanly and educated Prince bears no external resemblance to these eccentric figures, he does possess their traditional gift of spiritual insight." Rogozhin, sensing the Prince's unique qualities, immediately makes him his confidant and tells him the story of his obsession with Nastasya Filippovna. Later in the novel when, out of jealousy, Rogozhin has developed a hatred for him, Myshkin continues to treat Rogozhin as his friend and brother and, as with Nastasya Filippovna, is able to temporarily draw him out of his darkness and into a space of light and hope. But like Nastasya Filippovna, the negative voice of his obsession always reasserts itself in Myshkin's absence, and provokes him to violence.

=== Aglaya Ivanovna ===
Aglaya Ivanovna's noble and passionate nature leads her to idealise the Prince, turning him into a Don Quixote-like figure, particularly in relation to his attempts to "save" Nastasya Filippovna. Although the Prince is fascinated by Aglaya and falls in love with her, at no time is he influenced by this idealisation or by any of her other misguided opinions. Aglaya's illusions and the Prince's real motivations are juxtaposed in a number of scenes or consecutive scenes. For example, in a scene from Part II Aglaya reads aloud Pushkin's poem "The Poor Knight", unambiguously indicating to the assembled company that she is identifying the Prince with the poem's subject, a noble Knight who goes off to fight heroically in the Crusades. When this scene is interrupted by the arrival of the group of Nihilists who are seeking to slander the Prince and exploit his wealth, Aglaya is ecstatic that he will have the opportunity to "defend himself triumphantly". Instead the Prince humbly tries to make peace with the young men and calmly absorbs their insults and provocations, even sympathising with them and offering assistance. In the dinner party scene at the Epanchins' house in Part IV of the novel, Myshkin delivers a passionate denunciation of Catholicism, describing it as an unchristian religion because it has been dominated by the desire for political supremacy. He is thus denouncing "the very confusion of the temporal and the spiritual that, on the personal level, Aglaya wishes him to incarnate."

As with the other characters, Myshkin's persistently gentle and insightful voice is able at various times to affect Aglaya's interior dialogue in a way that enables her to find her true voice, but she too is unable to sustain the change it produces. In their longest and most significant dialogue, during their secret rendezvous at "the green seat", her speech alternates between a spontaneous humour and innocence prompted by Myshkin's sincere love for her, and angry outbursts prompted by a misinterpretation of his devotion to Nastasya Filippovna and his failure to embody her romantic ideal.

=== Ippolit Terentyev ===
The character of Ippolit only has a relatively peripheral role in the plot, but he is of vital importance because he represents an antithetical orientation to Myshkin in relation to the problems of life and death, God and morality, that form the thematic basis of the novel. Like Myshkin, Ippolit lives in the shadow of illness and death, but his tormented nihilistic worldview excludes the vision of harmony, joy and compassion that is so essential to Myshkin. Consequently, he is impelled to increasing extremes of rebellion—against society, against nature and against God, as he strives to affirm his will in the face of his impotence.

Despite their apparently opposite orientations, Ippolit and the Prince have much in common. It is occasionally evident that Ippolit shares Myshkin's sense of the sacred and the beautiful, and he consciously addresses himself to that sensibility when constructing his atheistic philosophy. Ippolit's interpretation of the book's key religious symbol, Holbein's painting The Body of the Dead Christ in the Tomb, as something that perfectly illustrates the omnipotence of "blind nature", is posited precisely because it is Christ who is depicted: "nature" has "senselessly seized, smashed and devoured, dully and without feeling, a great priceless Being, a Being worth all of nature and its laws, worth the whole Earth, which was created perhaps solely for the emergence of that Being."

Myshkin remains silent in response to Ippolit's sarcastic barbs about Christian humility, and does not make any attempt to refute his convoluted atheistic arguments. When engaging only with each other, the Prince's quietism and sincere empathy occasionally elicit a corresponding consciousness in Ippolit, but he always later reverts to his cynical bitterness.
