= Nastasya Filippovna =

Heroine of "The Idiot" by Fyodor Dostoevsky

Nastasya Filippovna Barashkova (pre-reform and post-reform Russian: Настасья Филипповна Барашкова, romanized: Nastásʹya Filíppovna Baráshkova) is the principal heroine of Fyodor Dostoevsky's 1869 novel The Idiot.

Though of aristocratic origin, beautiful and intelligent, Nastasya Filippovna is regarded by society as a 'fallen' woman, owing to her having spent four years as the concubine of the aristocrat Totsky, a position into which she was forced at the age of sixteen. Much of the drama of Nastasya Filippovna's character comes from the contradiction between her essential innocence, which is clearly recognized by the novel's central character Prince Myshkin, and the attitude of society that implies an irredeemable moral corruption, a view that she herself has inwardly embraced.

== Significance of the character to the novel ==
Nastasya Filippovna occupies a vital position in two overlapping dramas in the novel, both of which could be described as love triangles. The first involves the characters of Prince Myshkin, Nastasya Filippovna and Parfyon Rogozhin, and the second involves Myshkin, Nastasya Filippovna and Aglaya Epanchina.

=== Nastasya Filippovna, Myshkin and Rogozhin ===
In the first triangle, the two male protagonists represent an appeal to one or other of the contradictory voices in the inner dialogue of Nastasya Filippovna's soul. According to Mikhail Bakhtin, "Nastasya Filippovna's voice is divided between the voice that pronounces her a guilty 'fallen woman' and the voice that vindicates and accepts her." Myshkin, himself a pure-hearted man, represents for her this second voice, and he unreservedly affirms her innocence even when she is fully immersed in her destructive role as the corrupted and condemned woman. She herself recognizes Myshkin as the possible realization of her innocence, but convinced also of her own corruption, she is equally driven by self-destructive and vengeful urges, and she refuses to cast herself in the role of a corrupter of children like Totsky. Thus she chooses to give herself to Rogozhin, for whom she can wholly become the 'fallen' woman. This is not because Rogozhin himself in any way morally condemns her, but because his mad and violent obsession with her resonates with her self-destructive urge, or the voice that identifies her as guilty.

All the essentials of this drama are established in Part 1 of the novel, particularly in two crucial scenes. The first is at the Ivolgins' apartment, where Nastasya Filippovna is visiting the household of her potential fiancé, Ganya. Here she meets Myshkin, who is renting a room from the Ivolgins, for the first time. Totsky has offered a large sum of money for the arranged marriage, but Nastasya Filippovna distrusts Ganya's motives and is aware that his family disapproves of her. She deliberately increases the tension in the room by mocking them and behaving insultingly, and when Rogozhin suddenly arrives with a retinue of drunken rogues, she laughingly encourages his inebriated attempts to buy her away from Ganya. When the scene reaches a climax, with Ganya on the point of striking his own sister for spitting in his face, Myshkin defuses the situation by diverting Ganya's violence toward himself. In the stunned aftermath, Nastasya Filippovna maintains, somewhat less assuredly, her sarcastic tone, and Myshkin reproaches her with feeling: "Aren't you ashamed? Surely you are not what you are pretending to be now? It isn't possible!" (p 108). This produces a change, and as Nastasya Filippovna leaves she kisses the hand of Ganya's mother and whispers to her that Myshkin is right. Rogozhin does not notice the gesture, and goes off with his retinue to raise the 100,000 rubles he has offered.

The second scene occurs later that evening at Nastasya Filippovna's birthday soirée. In the presence of all the interested parties and a number of other guests (including Myshkin, who has turned up uninvited), she is to announce her decision on the proposed marriage. During the course of the evening a game is played in which each person must recount the story of the worst thing they have ever done. Totsky tells an innocuous anecdote from the distant past, and Nastasya Filippovna becomes angry. She turns to the Prince and asks him whether she should marry Ganya. Myshkin advises her not to, and she immediately announces that she is following this advice. At this point, Rogozhin and his retinue arrive with the 100,000 rubles. Nastasya Filippovna prepares to leave with them, but Myshkin advises her not to go with Rogozhin either, and offers to marry her himself. He speaks gently and sincerely, assuring her that she is pure and not to blame, and that he will love and respect her all his life. She is temporarily stunned as she realizes that Myshkin is the embodiment of her long dreamed-of innocence, but quickly falls back into her destructive persona. She tells Myshkin that she will not be like Totsky and corrupt children, and, after throwing the 100,000 rubles in the fire for Ganya to retrieve if he wants them, leaves with Rogozhin.

Throughout the novel Nastasya Filippovna is torn between these two interlocked but irreconcilable drives, and all three participants in the triangle are tortured as a result. Myshkin is tortured by the clarity of his insight into her suffering. Rogozhin is tortured by her cruelty towards him and disdain for his love, and by jealousy of Myshkin. Nastasya Filippovna is tortured by her inability to accept either her innocence or her guilt, while at the same time ardently believing in both, and she flees from one to the other, from Rogozhin to Myshkin and from Myshkin back to Rogozhin, being driven slowly insane by the impossibility of resolution. According to Joseph Frank: "Facing the insurmountable contradiction of inner purity and her outward disgrace, Nastasya Filippovna as a character is irremediably doomed, and she will function to bring down 'her saviour', the Prince, in her own tragic end."

=== Nastasya Filippovna, Myshkin and Aglaya ===
Early in Part 2 of the novel we learn that the relationship between Nastasya Filippovna and Rogozhin has broken down, and that Rogozhin thinks this has happened because Nastasya Filippovna is really in love with the Prince. Although Rogozhin continues his tortured pursuit of Nastasya Filippovna and maintains an ambivalent friendship with Myshkin, he shows himself to be capable of doing violence to both of them. After this the first triangle recedes somewhat into the background, although it remains as an ominous presence in all the characters' minds.

In Parts 2 and 3 the main narrative focus shifts to the second triangle, in which Nastasya Filippovna plays a secondary but essential role in the course taken by the relationship between the Prince and Aglaya Epanchin. Aglaya is fascinated by the Prince's efforts to 'save' the 'fallen woman', misinterpreting it as a heroic and chivalrous deed like that of a medieval knight, a "serious and not comic" Don Quixote, or the Poor Knight in Pushkin's poem who performs acts of valour in the Crusades in the name of his Christian ideal. By thus idealizing Myshkin, she fails to see the depth and sincerity of his compassionate response to Nastasya Filippovna's suffering. Nastasya Filippovna, unable to embrace Myshkin's love or accept herself as pure, in turn idealizes Aglaya as a manifestation of true purity, and desperately tries to bring her and Myshkin together. She seeks, largely successfully, to publicly disgrace an apparent suitor to Aglaya—the Epanchins' friend Yevgeny Pavlovich, and writes long letters to Aglaya telling her she is in love with her and pleading with her to marry Myshkin. Aglaya interprets this as an indication that Nastasya Filippovna is in love with Myshkin herself, and is trying to keep a hold on him by playing the role of tragic victim. As the love relationship begins to develop between Aglaya and Myshkin, Aglaya, shaken by the letters and influenced by ill-intentioned gossip, begins to see Nastasya Filippovna as her rival, and eventually forces the Prince into making a choice between them.

It is only in Part 4 that the three characters appear together for the first time in an extended scene. Through Rogozhin and other intermediaries, Aglaya has arranged a meeting with Nastasya Filippovna. She brings the Prince to the meeting, and Rogozhin is also present. Nastasya Filippovna is unsure what to expect, but it quickly becomes apparent that Aglaya's purpose is to castigate and insult her. Nastasya Filippovna is shocked, as her belief in Aglaya's purity and superiority had been sincere. Myshkin is aware of this, and tries to dissuade Aglaya, which provokes her to greater anger. As Aglaya becomes more and more unrestrained and vindictive, Nastasya Filippovna begins to respond in kind. She orders Rogozhin to leave and demands that the Prince stay with her. Overcome, not for the first time, with the pain and despair in Nastasya Filippovna's face, Myshkin turns to Aglaya and reproaches her for the attack. Distraught and now full of hatred for him, Aglaya runs off. Myshkin tries to go after her but Nastasya Filippovna stops him.

Following this, the relationship between Myshkin and Aglaya effectively ends, and in the book's concluding chapters the narrative focus returns to the first triangle. Nastasya Filippovna and Myshkin become engaged, at her insistence, but on the day of the wedding she again flees to Rogozhin. In so doing, she abandons once and for all any hope of finally accepting herself, and effectively signs her own death warrant. According to Bakhtin, for Nastasya Filippovna "Rogozhin means the knife, and she knows it."
