= Joseph Frank (writer) =

American literary scholar (1918–2013)

- Born: October 6, 1918 New York City, U.S.
- Died: February 27, 2013 (aged 94) Palo Alto, California, U.S.
- Occupation: Literary scholar; biographer
- Education: University of Chicago (PhD)
- Spouse: Marguerite Frank (m. 1953)
- Children: 2

Joseph Frank (October 6, 1918 – February 27, 2013) was an American literary scholar and a leading expert on the life and work of Russian novelist Fyodor Dostoevsky. Frank's five-volume biography of Dostoevsky is frequently cited among the major literary biographies of the 20th century. David Foster Wallace called him the "definitive biographer of one of the best fiction writers ever." Gary Saul Morson wrote that Frank's five-volume biography "is far and away the best comprehensive account of a Russian writer".

== Biography ==
Joseph Frank was born Joseph Nathaniel Glassman on the Lower East Side of Manhattan in 1918. His father died when he was young, and his mother remarried William Frank; the family then moved to Brooklyn.

Frank attended classes at New York University in the 1930s and the University of Wisconsin–Madison in the early 1940s, but never earned a Bachelor's degree. Frank went to Paris on a Fulbright Scholarship in 1950, and in 1952 he was accepted by the Committee on Social Thought at the University of Chicago, where he eventually earned a Ph.D. In 1953, he married mathematician Marguerite Frank.

He taught at the University of Minnesota and Rutgers, and was a professor of comparative literature at Princeton from 1966 to 1985. He finished his teaching career at Stanford.

Frank died of pulmonary failure in 2013, survived by his wife and their two daughters.

== Work ==
Frank's multi-volume biography of Fyodor Dostoevsky has been called the best biography of Dostoevsky in any language, including Russian. As a scholar of comparative literature, Frank earned honors including the Modern Language Association's James Russell Lowell Prize (1977 and 1986) and the Distinguished Contributions Award of the American Association for the Advancement of Slavic Studies (2008). As professor emeritus of Slavic languages and literatures at Stanford, Frank's critical work extended to other Russian and Ukrainian authors, too, from Nikolai Gogol and Alexander Herzen to Roman Jakobson and Mikhail Bakunin.

=== Biographer of Dostoevsky ===
Frank began work on his Dostoevsky biography in the 1970s. Originally conceived as a single volume, it ultimately grew to five volumes totaling more than 2,400 pages. A single condensed version of the five volumes was published in 2010 under the title Dostoevsky: A Writer in His Time.

In 2019, Princeton University Press published Lectures on Dostoevsky, a collection of Frank's never-before-published Stanford lectures on Dostoevsky's major works.

==== Dostoevsky Biography (5 Volumes) ====
- Volume 1 — Dostoevsky: The Seeds of Revolt, 1821–1849 (1976)
- Volume 2 — Dostoevsky: The Years of Ordeal, 1850–1859 (1983)
- Volume 3 — Dostoevsky: The Stir of Liberation, 1860-1865 (1986)
- Volume 4 — Dostoevsky: The Miraculous Years, 1865-1871 (1995)
- Volume 5 — Dostoevsky: The Mantle of the Prophet, 1871-1881 (2002)

==== One-Volume Abridgement ====
- Dostoevsky: A Writer in His Time (2009)

=== Theory of Spatial Form ===
Outside of Slavic studies, Frank was best known for his three-part essay, "Spatial Form in Modern Literature," beginning with the publication of its first part in 1945 for The Sewanee Review and ultimately revised and collected into the book The Idea of Spatial Form in 1991. This collection includes 2 follow-up essays published between 1977-8, wherein Frank maintains a dialogue with those critics who raised issues with his original 1945 essay. According to Stanford's Darci Gardner, his "willingness to engage with others and to give all ideas full consideration was one of Frank’s many admirable qualities as an intellectual." The book includes 3 additional essays, previously published between 1950 and 1961, which likewise treat the themes of abstraction and representation in both fine art and literature.

A common point of reference throughout The Idea of Spatial Form is the work of art historian of Wilhelm Worringer. To Worringer, cultural epochs that favor naturalistic, organic forms of representation in their plastic arts demonstrate a collective sense of harmony and equilibrium with the natural world, as Frank summarizes:

The heart of Worringer's book consists in his discussion of the spiritual conditions which impel the will-to-art to move in the direction of either naturalism or its opposite. Naturalism, Worringer points out, always has been created by cultures that have achieved an equilibrium between man and the cosmos. Like the Greeks of the classical period, man feels himself at one with organic nature; or, like modern man from the Renaissance to the close of the nineteenth century, he is convinced of his ability to dominate and control natural forces. In both these periods man has a relationship of confidence and intimacy with a world in which he feels at home; and he creates a naturalistic art that delights in reproducing the forms and appearances of the organic world. [...] On the other hand, when the relationship between man and the cosmos is one of disharmony and disequilibrium, we find that nonorganic, linear-geometric styles are always produced.

Worringer thereby draws a comparison between the modern painters and sculptors of the early twentieth century, on the one hand, and the historically or geographically distant art forms of those he considered "primitive peoples" on the other. Where both cultures may share a sense of alienation or trepidation with the physical world, it can be seen reflected in their preferences for similarly geometric, abstract styles of artistic expression.

Frank's innovation was to derive a corresponding theory of spatial form for modern literature that parallels Worringer's theory for the plastic arts. In doing so, he wove together Worringer's ideas with the previous observations of literary critics like T. E. Hulme and Allen Tate, who evaluated the non-chronological narrative aspects and syntactic abnormalities that were so common in modernist prose and poetry. Frank's great synthesis was to employ these temporal elements as a complement to the spatial elements in Worringer's analysis:

By this juxtaposition of past and present, as Allen Tate realized, history becomes ahistorical. Time is no longer felt as an objective, causal progression with clearly marked-out differences between periods; now it has become a continuum in which distinctions between past and present are wiped out. And here we have a striking parallel with the plastic arts. Just as the dimension of depth has vanished from the sphere of visual creation, so the dimension of historical depth has vanished from the content of the major works of modern literature. Past and present are apprehended spatially, locked in a timeless unity that, while it may accentuate surface differences, eliminates any feeling of sequence by the very act of juxtaposition. Ever since the Renaissance, modern man has cultivated both the objective visual imagination (the ability to portray space) and the objective historical imagination (the ability to locate events in chronological time); both have now been abandoned.
