= Heads and Tails (film) =

- Film poster
- Directed by: Georgiy Daneliya
- Written by: Georgiy Daneliya; Sergey Dernov
- Produced by: Vladimir Chudovsky; Yuri Kushnerev
- Starring: Kirill Pirogov; Polina Kutepova
- Cinematography: Gennady Karyuk
- Edited by: Elena Taraskina
- Music by: Giya Kancheli
- Production company: Mosfilm
- Release date: 3 November 1995
- Running time: 86 minutes
- Country: Russia
- Language: Russian

Heads and Tails (Russian: Орёл и решка, romanized: Oryol i reshka) is a 1995 Russian comedy-drama film directed by Georgiy Daneliya, based on the short story On the First Breath by Vladimir Makanin.

== Plot ==
The main character Oleg Chagin (Kirill Pirogov), a gas engineer, arrives from the North where he was earning money for his wedding in Moscow. He has received news that his fiancée Elena has already married another man – Vadim Klimov. Oleg wishes to get Elena back but is unsuccessful in his attempts. His acquaintance Georgiy (Leonid Yarmolnik) lets Oleg stay in his apartment, as he leaves for business in Hong Kong.

Oleg becomes fond of another girl – Zinaida Prishchepkina (Polina Kutepova). Zinaida has an ex-husband – a prisoner, to whom the girl is flying to Sochi for a visit.

Subsequently, Elena gets into a car crash and is in a hospital in a serious condition. Oleg quickly returns to Moscow, secretly enters the hospital and finds out that the patient Klimova can only be helped by a very expensive medicine which no one is able to obtain. Oleg buys this medicine and passes it to the doctor, who is treating the sick Klimova. After this, his jacket is stolen in which he kept all his money, which means that he has to make a living doing difficult and demanding work. Additionally, Oleg rents out Georgiy's apartment to dishonest gypsies who later fail to pay. He has nowhere to live and ends up getting pneumonia.

By chance, he meets Zinaida again, who accompanies Oleg to his home and takes care of him. The illness lasts a long time, and when it recedes, Oleg finds out that Elena has already been discharged from the hospital, her condition was not so severe, and ironically Oleg was getting money for a medicine for someone else with the same last name. Encouraged, he goes to Elena's home, but gets straight to the engagement of Elena and the surgeon from the hospital in which she was staying; with Vadim, her romantic relationship is finished for good.

Oleg returns to the North with his friend Zinaida, where she immediately marries him. Oleg names a drilling rig "Prishchepkina" in honor of Zina.

== Cast ==
- Kirill Pirogov – Oleg Chagin
- Polina Kutepova – Zina Prishchepkina
- Oleg Basilashvili – Professor Savitsky
- Stanislav Govorukhin – Zosima Petrovich
- Leonid Yarmolnik – Gosha
- Ivan Ryzhov – Timofeich
- Gennady Nazarov – Vadik

== Awards ==
- State Prize of the Russian Federation in the field of motion picture arts of 1996 (May 29, 1997) – Georgiy Daneliya for feature films Passport, Nastya, Eagle and tails.
- 1996 – Special jury prize at Kinotavr.
