= Tears Were Falling =

- Film poster
- Directed by: Georgiy Daneliya
- Written by: Georgiy Daneliya; Alexander Volodin; Kir Bulychev
- Produced by: Nikolay Garo
- Starring: Yevgeny Leonov; Iya Savvina; Nina Grebeshkova; Aleksandra Yakovleva; Boryslav Brondukov; Boris Andreyev
- Cinematography: Yuri Klimenko
- Edited by: Tatyana Egorycheva
- Music by: Gia Kancheli
- Production company: Mosfilm
- Release date: 1982
- Running time: 86 minutes
- Country: Soviet Union
- Language: Russian

Tears Were Falling (Russian: Слёзы капали, romanized: Slyozy kapali) is a 1982 Soviet fantasy drama film directed by Georgiy Daneliya. The plot can be viewed as a modern interpretation of the fairy tale by Hans Christian Andersen The Snow Queen. It was the last film role of actor Boris Andreyev.

== Plot ==
The plot of the story is the same as in the fairy tale by Hans Christian Andersen. An evil troll creates a magic mirror that reflects and exaggerates everything bad and evil. The mirror shatters, and one of its millions of fragments falls into the eyes of Pavel Ivanovich Vasin, a resident of the small town of Zarechensk. Vasin changes beyond recognition. Vasin kicks his son out of the household, quarrels with his wife, hurls verbal abuse at his colleagues at work, and even goes so far as to attempt suicide.

== Cast ==
- Yevgeny Leonov as Pavel Ivanovich Vasin
- Iya Savvina as Irina, Vasin's wife
- Nina Grebeshkova as Zinaida Galkina
- Aleksandra Yakovleva as Lyusya
- Boryslav Brondukov as Fyodor, alcoholic
- Boris Andreyev as Nikolai Vanichkin
- Pyotr Shcherbakov as Sklyansky
- Nina Ruslanova as Dina
- Andrei Tolubeyev as Tolik
- Georgiy Daneliya as a passenger on the tram (uncredited)

== Production and release ==
The working title of the film was Gladiator.

The film was shot in Kaluga, Rostov, Ashgabat, and Odessa.

The film was banned from screening abroad, six months lay on the shelf, and then was released in a limited release.
