= Nastya (film) =

- Film poster
- Russian: Настя
- Directed by: Georgy Daneliya
- Written by: Aleksandr Adabashyan; Georgiy Daneliya; Aleksandr Volodin
- Produced by: Sergey Baev; Irina Ulanova
- Starring: Polina Kutepova; Irina Markova; Valery Nikolaev; Yevgeny Leonov; Aleksandr Abdulov
- Cinematography: Pavel Lebeshev
- Edited by: Yelena Taraskina
- Music by: Andrei Petrov
- Production company: Mosfilm
- Release date: 1993
- Running time: 89 min.
- Country: Russia
- Language: Russian

Nastya (Russian: Настя) is a 1993 Russian comedy film directed by Georgy Daneliya. And written by Aleksandr Adabashyan, Georgiy Daneliya, Aleksandr Volodin.

== Plot ==
Anastasia Plotnikova (Nastya) is a young woman who lives with her constantly ill mother, a janitor. Her mother hopes to see Nastya with a boyfriend, but this has not happened. One night Nastya helps an unfamiliar elderly woman after the wheel of her bicycle falls into a sewer well. In return, the woman promises to grant Nastya two wishes. Nastya's first wish is to become beautiful. Her life then changes, and men are attracted to her, but this does not make her happy. When Nastya makes a second wish, to return to how she was before, she finds love.

== Cast ==
- Polina Kutepova as Nastya
- Irina Markova as Nastya after transformation
- Valery Nikolaev as Aleksandr Pichugin
- Yevgeny Leonov as Yakov Alekseevich
- Aleksandr Abdulov as Teterin
- Galina Petrova as Antonina Plotnikova
- Nina Ter-Osipyan as Enchantress
- Natalya Shchukina as Valya
- Olga Nedovodina-Finney as Katya (as Olga Nedovodina)
- Aleksandr Potapov as Maksim Petrovich
- Nina Grebeshkova as Teterin's secretary
- Norbert Kuchinke as foreign journalist
- Yuli Gusman as show host
- Savely Kramarov as burglar thief
- Leonid Yarmolnik as a passer-by with a hat
- Roman Madyanov as Morgunin
- Aleksandr Adabashyan as a representative of the ministry of culture
- Yuri Rost as TV man
- Georgy Danelia as cultural worker

== Awards and nominations ==
- 1994 — Nika Award
  - Nominated for Best Sound Editing (Valentin Bobrovsky)

== Songs ==
- American Boy by Kombinaciya
