= 36th Venice International Film Festival =

Italian film festival in 1979

- Festival poster
- Location: Venice, Italy
- Founded: 1932
- Festival date: 24 August – 5 September 1979
- Website: Website

Venice Film Festival chronology
- 37th 35th

The 36th annual Venice International Film Festival was held from 24 August to 5 September 1979.

There was no jury because from 1969 to 1979 the festival was not competitive.

== Official Selection ==
The following films were selected to be screened:

=== Venezia Cinema 79 ===
| English title | Original title | Director(s) | Production country |
|---|---|---|---|
| Anchieta, José do Brasil | | Paulo Cesar Saraceni | Brazil |
| Autumn Marathon | Осенний марафон | Georgi Daneliya | Soviet Union |
| Cinema | Синема | Liana Eliava | Soviet Union |
| The Days on Earth Are Flowing | Zemaljski dani teku | Goran Paskaljevic | Yugoslavia |
| Escape from Alcatraz | | Don Siegel | United States |
| La Luna | | Bernardo Bertolucci | Italy, United States |
| The Meadow | Il prato | Paolo and Vittorio Taviani | Italy |
| The Magician of Lublin | הקוסם מלובלין | Menahem Golan | Israel, West Germany |
| Mimi | Un dramma borghese | Florestano Vancini | Italy |
| More American Graffiti | | Bill L. Norton | United States |
| Ogro | | Gillo Pontecorvo | Spain |
| Passe montagne | | Jean-François Stévenin | France |
| The River | النهر | Faisal Al-Yassiri | Iraq |
| Saint Jack | | Peter Bogdanovich | United States |
| Samba the Great | Samba le grand | Moustapha Alassane | Níger |
| Soldiers | Soldados | Alfonso Ungría | Spain |
| The Strangling | 絞殺 | Kaneto Shindô | Japan |
| El Super | | Leon Ichaso, Orlando Jiménez Leal | United States |
| Le vieil Anaï | | Germaine Dieterlen, Jean Rouch | France |
| The Wanderers | | Philip Kaufman | United States |
| The Water-Carrier Is Dead | السقا مات | Salah Abouseif | Egypt, Tunisia |

=== Officina Veneziana ===
| English title | Original title | Director(s) | Production country |
|---|---|---|---|
| France/tour/détour/deux/enfants | | Jean-Luc Godard, Anne-Marie Miéville | France |
| I giorni cantati | | Paolo Pietrangeli | Italy |
| Improvviso | | Edith Bruck | Italy |
| Little Valentino | A kis Valentinó | András Jeles | Hungary |
| The Nouba of the Women of Mount Chenoua | La Nouba des femmes du Mont Chenoua | Assia Djebbar | Algeria |
| ORG | | Fernando Birri | Italy |
| ¡Que viva México! | | Sergei Eisenstein | Soviet Union |
| Ratataplan | | Maurizio Nichetti | Italy |
| The Wedding of Zein | عرس الزين | Khalid Al Siddiq | Kuwait |
| West Indies | | Med Hondo | France |

=== La Notte di Officina ===
| English title | Original title | Director(s) | Production country |
|---|---|---|---|
| Ammazzare il tempo | | Mimmo Rafele | Italy |
| From the Clouds to the Resistance | Dalla nube alla resistenza | Danièle Huillet, Jean-Marie Straub | Italy |
| Hot Tomorrows | | Martin Brest | United States |
| Le Navire Night | | Marguerite Duras | France |
| Perceval le Gallois | | Éric Rohmer | France |
| Poto and Cabengo | | Jean-Pierre Gorin | France |
| The Space Movie | | Tony Palmer | United Kingdom, United States |
| Tachi and Her Fathers | 达吉和她的父亲 | Jiayi Wang | China |
| Womanlight | Clair de femme | Costa-Gavras | France |

== Independent Awards ==
=== FIPRESCI Prize ===
- Le passe-montagne by Jean-François Stévenin
- La nouba des femmes du mont Chenoua by Assia Djebar
  - Honorable Mention: Le vieil Anaï by Jean Rouch

=== Pasinetti Award ===
- Best Film:
  - Autumn Marathon by Georgiy Daneliya
  - Saint Jack by Peter Bogdanovich
- Best Actor: Yevgeny Leonov for Autumn Marathon
- Best Actress: Nobuko Otowa for The Strangling

=== Pietro Bianchi Award ===
- Cesare Zavattini
