= Ku! Kin-dza-dza =

2013 Russian animated film

- Film poster
- Directed by: Georgy Danelia; Tatyana Ilyina
- Written by: Georgy Danelia; Andrey Usachov
- Produced by: Konstantin Ernst; Leonid Yarmolnik
- Starring: Nikolai Gubenko; Andrei Leonov; Alexei Kolgan; Aleksandr Adabashyan
- Edited by: Sergey Minakin
- Music by: Giya Kancheli
- Distributed by: CTB; Channel One Russia
- Release date: 11 April 2013
- Running time: 97 minutes
- Country: Russia
- Language: Russian
- Budget: 140 million rubles

Ku! Kin-dza-dza (Russian: Ку! Кин-дза-дза) is a 2013 Russian animated science fiction film by Georgy Danelia and his last film before his death in 2019. It is an animated remake of Danelia's 1986 live-action film Kin-dza-dza!. Although it preserves much of the original movie's social commentary, Ku! Kin-dza-dza is notably less dark and dystopian than the original, and more targeted towards youth and an international audience. The film is mainly traditionally animated with some computer animation in it.

== Plot ==
The remake follows the plot of the original with minor changes. While the original story was set in 1980s, the remake is set in 2010s, some of the scenes were altered, and the two new protagonists are different from their 1986 counterparts.

A renowned cellist Vladimir Chizhov (Uncle Vova) and his teenage nephew Tolik meet an alien with a teleportation device. Tolik carelessly pushes a button on the device, and he and Uncle Vova are beamed to the planet Plyuk in Kin-dza-dza galaxy. The planet is a post-apocalyptic desert without resources, ruled by a brutal racist regime. The two travellers meet three locals, Bi, Wef and their robot Abradox, who travel on a pepelats and constantly try to cheat and betray the naive newcomers. Tolik and Uncle Vova have to go a long distance through the rusting world of Kin-dza-dza to find their way home.

== Cast ==
- Nikolai Gubenko as Uncle Vova
- Ivan Tsekhmistrenko as Tolik Tsarapkin
- Andrei Leonov as Wef (son of Yevgeny Leonov, who performed the role in the original movie)
- Alexei Kolgan as Bi and Kyrr
- Aleksandr Adabashyan as Abradox
- Georgy Danelia as Camomile and Diogenes
- Igor Kvasha as Yk, a carousel owner
- Irina Devlyashova as Lidka Liziakina
- Polina Kutepova as Tolik's Mother
- Margarita Rasskazova as Astronomer
- Igor Sannikov as Old Man in a wheelbarrow
- Alla Sannikova as Old Woman in a wheelbarrow
- Victoria Radunskaya as Old Woman in the planetarium
- Vakhtang Kikabidze as Tratz, a leader of the smugglers
- Galina Danelia-Yurkova as Frosya, Uncle Vova's housekeeper

== Critical reception ==
The film was met with generally favorable reviews in Russian media. It holds an average rating of 82 out of 100 at Russian review aggregator Kritikanstvo. Ku! Kin-dza-dza received positive reviews from Russian version of Empire, Mir Fantastiki, Argumenty i Fakty, Rossiyskaya Gazeta, Trud and Izvestiya, and mediocre ratings from Lenta.ru, Vedomosti and Afisha. Outside Russia, Vassilis Kroustallis at Zippyframes gave the film a positive review.

== Awards ==
- Asia Pacific Screen Awards
- Nika Award for best animated feature.
