= Lyubov Sokolova (actress) =

Soviet and Russian actress

- Любовь Соколова
- Born: Lyubov Sergeevna Sokolova; July 31, 1921; Ivanovo-Voznesensk, RSFSR
- Died: June 6, 2001 (aged 79); Moscow, Russia
- Occupation: actress
- Years active: 1946–2001
- Spouse(s): Georgy Arapovsky (died); Georgy Danelia (divorce)

Lyubov Sergeevna Sokolova (Russian: Любо́вь Серге́евна Соколо́ва; 31 July 1921 – 6 June 2001) was a Soviet and Russian cinema actress, named a People's Artist of the USSR. She played more than 300 film roles.

== Biography ==
Lyubov Sokolova studied cinematography with Boris Bibikov and Olga Pyzhova, graduating in 1946.

From 1951 to 1956, she was an actress with the Drama Theatre Group of the Soviet Forces in Germany (Potsdam). She was a studio actress from 1946 to 1951 and in 1956.

Sokolova had her movie debut in 1948, as the simple village woman Varvara in The Story of a Real Man. Some of the films she acted in included Quiet Flows the Don, Splendid Days, The story of Asya Klyachina, Far from Moscow, Shine, Shine, My Star, Crime and Punishment, Walking the Streets of Moscow, Thirty Three, The Irony of Fate, Moscow, My Love, White Bim Black Ear, Live Till Monday, Belorussian Station, Do Not Shoot at White Swans, Gentlemen of Fortune, From Dawn Till Sunset, Crash – Cop's Daughter.

In 1990, Sokolova was People's Artist of the Soviet Union. She was awarded many medals, including for Courage and for Labour Valour.

In Autumn 1994, Sokolova and Maya Bulgakova were victims of an accident as their car crashed into a pole. The actress was in intensive care and discharged after a few weeks, but Bulgakova died a few days later, without ever regaining consciousness.

Sokolova died on 6 June 2001 of a heart attack and was buried in Moscow, at the Kuntsevo Cemetery, near the grave of her son.

== Family ==
- First husband – Georgy Arapovsky, whom she met while studying at the film school.
- Her second husband was director and screenwriter Georgy Danelia. They lived together for about 26 years. In 1959 they had a son, director and poet Nikolai Sokolov-Danelia, who died at the age of 26.

== Selected filmography ==
- 1941 – Masquerade as girl of the ball (episode)
- 1951 – Far from Moscow as Olga Fyodorovna
- 1957 – The Cranes Are Flying as soldier woman (episode)
- 1958 – And Quiet Flows the Don
- 1959 – Ballad of a Soldier as a woman in the market (episode)
- 1960 – Splendid Days as Polina
- 1963 – Introduction to Life as Vasya and Lyusa's mother
- 1964 – The Alive and the Dead as doctor (episode)
- 1964 – Walking the Streets of Moscow as Kolka's mother
- 1965 – Thirty Three as Travkin's wife
- 1966 – Beware of the Car as judge
- 1966 – The Story of Asya Klyachina as Maria
- 1968 – We'll Live Till Monday as Levikova
- 1970 – Shine, Shine, My Star as Fyodor's wife
- 1970 – Crime and Punishment as Yelizaveta
- 1971 – Belorussian Station as Luba Prikhodko
- 1971 – Gentlemen of Fortune as kindergarten manager
- 1972 – Happy Go Lucky as train conductor (episode)
- 1972 – Privalov's Millions as Maria Bakhareva
- 1974 – Earthly Love as district committee member
- 1974 – Moscow, My Love as costume designer
- 1974 – Sokolovo as teacher
- 1975 – From Dawn Till Sunset as Pelagia Rozhnova
- 1976 – The Irony of Fate as Nadya's mother
- 1977 – White Bim Black Ear as switch woman (episode)
- 1980 – A Few Days from the Life of I.I. Oblomov as seeing off woman (episode)
- 1980 – Do Not Shoot at White Swans as zoo worker
- 1981 – Could One Imagine? as Lisa
- 1983 – Return from Orbit as Sofia Petrovna
- 1983 – Quarantine as aunt Katya
- 1985 – Do Not Marry, Girls as Praskovya Ilinichna
- 1985 – The Most Charming and Attractive as Nadya's mother
- 1988 – The Life of Klim Samgin as Anfimovna
- 1989 – Crash – Cop's Daughter as Yuliya Nikolaevna
- 1991 – Lost in Siberia as Klava
- 1994 – Assia and the Hen with the Golden Eggs as Maria
