= The Days on Earth Are Flowing =

1979 comedy-drama film

- Directed by: Goran Paskaljević
- Screenplay by: Goran Paskaljević
- Starring: Dimitrije Vujović
- Cinematography: Milan Spasić
- Edited by: Olga Skrigin
- Music by: Zoran Simjanović
- Release date: 1979
- Language: Serbian

The Days on Earth Are Flowing (Serbo-Croatian: Zemaljski dani teku, Земаљски дани теку), also known as Earth Days Pass By, is a 1979 Yugoslav comedy-drama film written and directed by Goran Paskaljević.

== Cast ==
- Dimitrije Vujović as the captain
- Obren Helcer as the flatmate
- Šarlota Pešić as the old woman
- Mila Keča as social worker

== Production ==
The film was originally shot in 16 mm and later blown up to 35 mm. The cast consists of non-professional actors.

== Release ==
The film premiered at the 1979 Pula Film Festival, in which the film received 5 awards, including the Bronze Arena. It was later screened at the 11th Moscow International Film Festival, and was entered into the main program at the 36th Venice International Film Festival, in its last non-competitive edition.

== Reception ==
A contemporary Variety review described the film as 'arguably his [Paskaljević's] best film to date', 'memorable', and 'one of the best pix on the aged made'.
