= Thirty Three (film) =

- Official film poster
- Directed by: Georgiy Daneliya
- Written by: Georgiy Daneliya; Valentin Yezhov; Viktor Konetsky
- Starring: Yevgeny Leonov; Nonna Mordyukova; Lyubov Sokolova; Viktor Avdyushko; Saveliy Kramarov
- Cinematography: Sergei Vronsky
- Edited by: Tatyana Zinchuk
- Music by: Andrei Petrov
- Production company: Mosfilm
- Release date: 22 April 1965
- Running time: 77 minutes
- Country: Soviet Union
- Language: Russian

Thirty Three (Russian: Тридцать три, romanized: Tridtsat tri) is a 1965 Soviet comedy film directed by Georgiy Daneliya. Its direct satire of the Khrushchev era proved too controversial for the authorities, resulting in the film being banned until glasnost in the 1980s. The lead role of factory worker Ivan Travkin was played by Yevgeny Leonov.

== Plot ==
Travkin, a kind and unassuming food chemist from a distant, rural Russian town, spends his time developing new carbonated soft drinks, and also sings in an amateur choir. But when a dentist discovers that Travkin has 33 teeth, he suddenly becomes a national celebrity. He is brought to Moscow as a medical phenomenon and studied by famous scientists; it is proclaimed that Travkin's 33rd tooth is unique, and may connect him to extraterrestrials from Mars. Travkin struggles with his celebrity status, is briefly confined to a psychiatric institution due to the slander of a jealous man, and has to fend off gold digging women, sycophant men, and journalists. The only respite he finds is in his roommate at a hotel, who is a friendly, earnest industrial diver on a holiday. Finally, Travkin is selected for a space mission, to be sent to Mars via teleportation. After a heroic goodbye and a countdown, the entire celebrity plot turns out to be a dream. Travkin is immensely relieved and returns to his quiet and unassuming life with renewed joy.

== Screening ban ==
The film Thirty Three was banned after the outrage of Soviet cosmonauts Yuri Gagarin and Alexei Leonov and the unofficial chief ideologue of the Communist Party, Mikhail Suslov. All to blame - the scene with the motorcade (Travkin is taken in a government limousine Chaika accompanied by motorcyclists), in which Suslov saw a parody of the recent solemn meeting of cosmonauts Pavel Belyaev and Alexei Leonov on Red Square.

Despite the official ban, copies of the film spread throughout the country and were shown clandestinely in cinemas until the ban was lifted in the 1980s.

== Cast ==
- Yevgeny Leonov as Ivan Travkin
- Nonna Mordyukova as Galina Pristyazhnyuk
- Lyubov Sokolova as Travkin's wife
- Viktor Avdyushko as Misha
- Saveliy Kramarov as Rodion Homutov
- Gennadi Yalovich as Scheremetyev
- Nikolay Parfyonov as Prokhorov
- Maria Vinogradova as Margarita Pavlovna
- Inna Churikova as Rosa
- Arkadi Trusov as Ivanov
- Vyacheslav Nevinny as Vasili
- Vladimir Basov as Museum boss
- Frunzik Mkrtchyan as Professor Bruk
- Rita Gladunko
- Sergei Martinson as Rosa's father
- Irina Skobtseva as Vera Sergeyevna
- Svetlana Svetlichnaya as TV worker
- Yuri Sarantsev as Taxi driver
- Pyotr Shcherbakov as philosopher
