= Norbert Kuchinke =

German journalist and actor

- Kuchinke in 1980
- Born: Norbert Georg Kuchinke; 5 May 1940; Schwarzwaldau, Silesia, Germany; Now Czarny Bór, Wałbrzych County, Poland
- Died: 3 December 2013 (aged 73); Berlin, Germany
- Occupations: Journalist, actor
- Years active: 1973–2013 (journalism), 1979–2008 (acting)

Norbert Georg Kuchinke (5 May 1940 – 3 December 2013) was a German journalist and actor.

Born in Schwarzwaldau, Silesia, Germany (now Czarny Bór, Poland), until 1956, he studied at a Russian speaking school and mastered the language. From 1973, Kuchinke was the first correspondent of Der Spiegel (Hamburg, West Germany) and Stern in Moscow, Soviet Union.

Apart from journalism, he was an actor, appearing in five films through 1979 to 2008, most commonly playing foreign roles. His most noted role was as Bill Hansen, a Danish professor in the Soviet comedy-drama Autumn Marathon.

Norbert Kuchinke died following a long illness on 3 December 2013, aged 73, at a hospital in Berlin, Germany.

== Filmography ==
Year	Title	Role	Notes
1979	Autumn Marathon	Bill Hansen, a Danish professor of Slavic studies	
1983	Two Chapters from the Family's Chronicle	a guest at a party for foreign correspondents	
1986	Boris Godunov	Walter Rosen	
1994	Nastya	Foreign correspondent	
2008	Where do Babies Come from?	Proxor Sr.	(final film role)
