= Beware of the Car =

1966 Soviet crime comedy drama film

- Soviet billboard theatrical poster of the film
- Directed by: Eldar Ryazanov
- Written by: Emil Braginsky; Eldar Ryazanov
- Starring: Innokenty Smoktunovsky; Oleg Yefremov; Andrei Mironov; Anatoli Papanov
- Narrated by: Yury Yakovlev
- Cinematography: Anatoly Mukasei; Vladimir Nakhabtsev
- Music by: Andrey Petrov
- Production company: Mosfilm
- Release date: 1966
- Running time: 94 min.
- Country: Soviet Union
- Language: Russian

Beware of the Car (Russian: Береги́сь автомоби́ля, translit. Beregis Avtomobilya, English titles Uncommon Thief, or Watch out for the Automobile) is a 1966 Soviet crime comedy drama film directed by Eldar Ryazanov, based on a screenplay by Emil Braginsky and produced by Mosfilm. It stars Innokenty Smoktunovsky, Oleg Yefremov, Andrei Mironov and Anatoli Papanov, among others. Beware of the Car is recognized as a satire of the film noir genre, highly unusual in Brezhnev-era society. It is credited for launching Soviet political satire as a film genre, typified by Ryazanov's work.

== Plot ==
Yuri Detochkin (Innokenty Smoktunovsky) is a humble and unassuming Soviet insurance broker who leads a double life as a car thief targeting corrupt officials and profiteers. Disillusioned by the inability of the militsiya, the police force of the Soviet Union, to address the widespread corruption he encounters in his line of work, Yuri meticulously documents the misdeeds of his wealthy clients, many of whom live far beyond their legitimate means. Once he gathers enough evidence, he steals their luxury vehicles, often overcoming elaborate security measures. Yuri resells the stolen cars and anonymously donates the proceeds to various orphanages, believing his actions to be a form of social justice. One of his most notable targets is Dima Semitsvetov (Andrei Mironov), a cunning retail embezzler who profits by selling foreign electronics "under the counter." Semitsvetov’s ill-gotten wealth includes a lavish dacha registered to his father-in-law, Semyon Vasilyevich (Anatoli Papanov), a retired Soviet Army officer, and a prized Volga car registered in his wife’s name. Despite his awareness of Dima’s misdeeds, Semyon humorously tolerates his behavior, adding a layer of comedic tension to the narrative.

While executing his covert operations, Yuri struggles with his personal life. A deeply private and reserved man, he has been in a long-term relationship with Lyuba (Olya Aroseva), a kind-hearted bus driver. However, his fear of commitment prevents him from taking their relationship to the next level, leaving Lyuba increasingly frustrated. In his spare time, Yuri immerses himself in his passion for theater as an amateur actor in a local production of Hamlet, where he plays opposite his close friend, Detective Maksim Podberyozovikov (Oleg Yefremov). Unbeknownst to Yuri, Maksim is assigned to investigate the recent string of car thefts that Yuri has been orchestrating. Maksim, a diligent investigator with a portrait of Konstantin Stanislavski rather than Felix Dzerzhinsky in his office, begins to piece together clues that point to Yuri as the elusive thief. When the detective finally uncovers the truth, he finds himself in a moral quandary, torn between his duty as a law enforcement officer and his understanding of Yuri’s altruistic motives.

As the story unfolds, Yuri's actions lead to a cascade of dramatic and comedic events, including a high-stakes car theft involving a crane operator and a tense chase through the countryside with a determined traffic inspector (Georgy Zhzhyonov). Maksim’s discovery of Yuri’s double life culminates in a pivotal confrontation, where Yuri reveals his meticulous records and receipts for the money donated to orphanages. Despite recognizing Yuri’s noble intentions, Maksim knows he must uphold the law. Yuri is eventually arrested but not before attending the premiere of their production of Hamlet, where he delivers a triumphant performance under police escort. In the final courtroom scenes, Yuri’s acquaintances, including Maksim and even Semyon Vasilyevich, speak in his defense, highlighting his moral integrity despite his illegal actions. The verdict remains ambiguous, but the film ends on a hopeful note, with Lyuba spotting Yuri, freshly released and smiling, as she rides a trolleybus through the city.

== Cast ==
- Innokenty Smoktunovsky as Yuri Detochkin
- Oleg Yefremov as Maksim Podberyozovikov
- Lyubov Dobrzhanskaya as Detochkin's mother
- Olga Aroseva as Lyuba
- Andrei Mironov as Dima Semitsvetov
- Anatoli Papanov as Semyon Vasilyevich
- Tatyana Gavrilova as Inna
- Georgiy Zhzhonov as a Militsiya officer
- Yevgeny Yevstigneyev as an acting coach
- Donatas Banionis as a priest
- Lyubov Sokolova as a judge
- Vyacheslav Nevinny as a car mechanic
- Gotlib Roninson as Yakov Mikhailovich
- Galina Volchek as a customer
- Sergey Kulagin as Philippe Cartuzov
- Yakov Lents as a tobacconist salesman
- Nikolay Parfyonov as a prosecutor
- Viktoria Radunskaya as Tanya
- Boris Runge as a man with suitcases

The author's narration was read by Yury Yakovlev.

== Production ==
The film's name is derived from traffic signs warning of locations where cars could potentially hit pedestrians or motorists, such as parking garages.

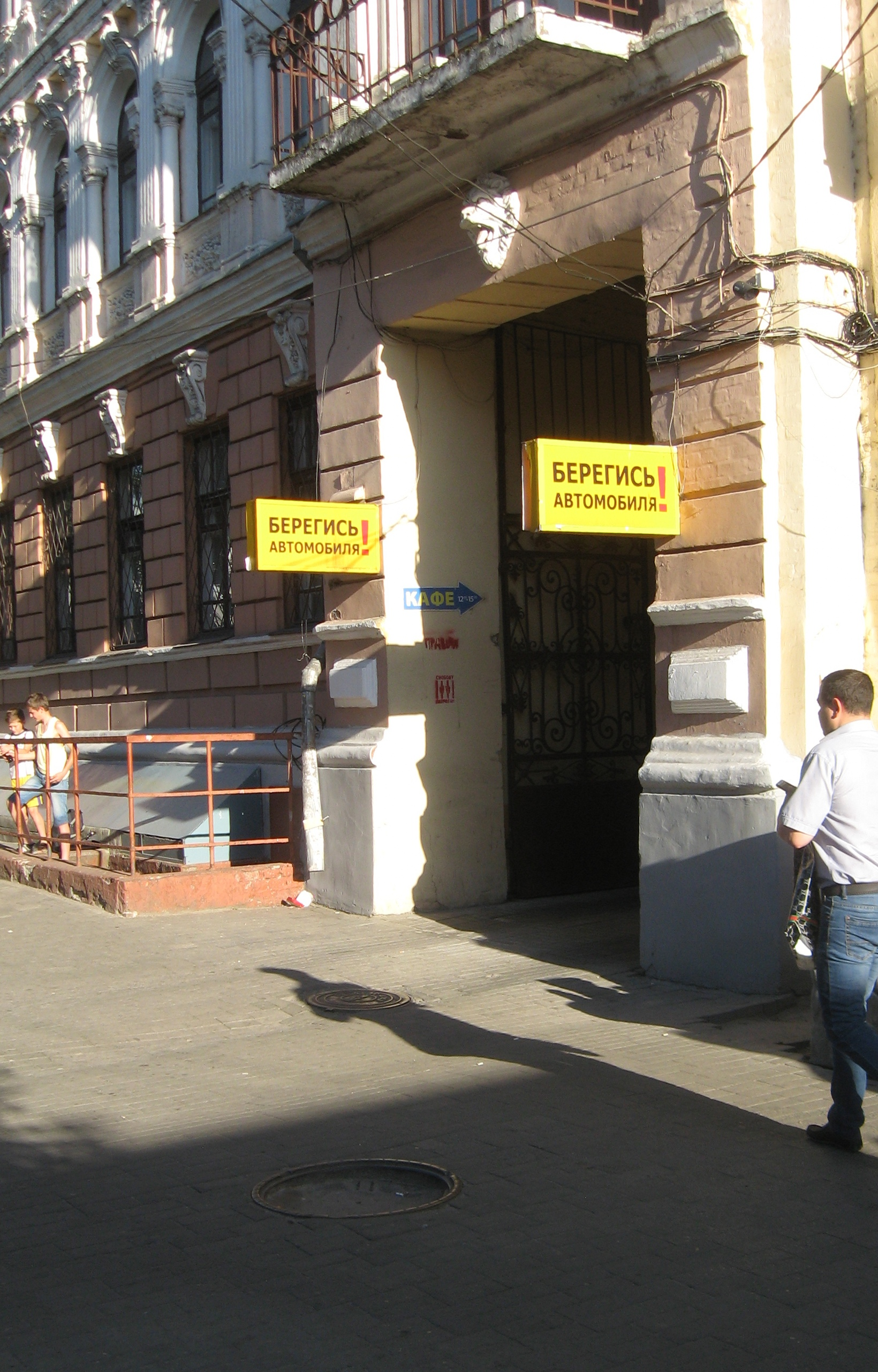
Signs reading "Beware of the Car", warning of locations where cars could potentially hit pedestrians or motorists. These signs were common in Soviet cities.

In the film, Detochkin and Podberezovikov act together in an amateur theatre which rehearses Hamlet – a play from Smoktunovsky's real-life acting career: he was reputed as the "best Hamlet on the Soviet stage" and starred in a celebrated film adaptation.

The waltz performed in the film is a distinguished melody composed by Andrey Petrov. Sergey Nikitin's repertoire includes a song named Glass Gentleman (lyrics by Yevgeny Yevtushenko), which used a waltz from the film.

All of the cars stolen by Detochkin are the GAZ-21 Volga model, the most prestigious Soviet car of the time. The GAZ-21 was the standard personal car for the Soviet elite, a satire element of the film which Ryazanov found very hard to get approved.

One scene featuring a petrol station includes American vehicles such as a 1955 Buick and a 1955 Oldsmobile. These were an extremely rare sighting for the location, since the United States had sanctions on the USSR and did not sell these cars within the Eastern Bloc.

According to many contemporary psychologists, Yuri Detochkin exhibits clear signs of Asperger’s syndrome. His behavior includes elements of "stimming," an obsession with justice, and a variety of talents—such as those of a skilled thief, driver, actor, and private investigator, alongside a sense of social awkwardness, a lack of conventional social integration, and a profound sense of altruism.

== Awards ==
The film was the leader of Soviet film distribution for 1966, viewed by 29 million people. Innokenty Smoktunovsky was recognized as the Best Actor of 1966.

The film won awards at the 1966 Edinburgh International Film Festival, 1966 Sydney Film Festival, 1967 Melbourne International Film Festival, and 1969 Cartagena Film Festival.

== See also ==
- Gone in 60 Seconds (1974 film), an American film that also focuses on an insurance agent who is secretly a car thief
- Gone in 60 Seconds (2000 film), a loose remake of the 1974 film with different characters, including a detective who pursues the main character, whom he knows personally
