= Gentlemen of Fortune =

- Film poster by A. Troshchenkov
- Directed by: Aleksandr Sery
- Written by: Georgiy Daneliya; Viktoriya Tokareva
- Starring: Yevgeny Leonov; Georgy Vitsin; Savely Kramarov; Radner Muratov
- Music by: Gennady Gladkov
- Distributed by: Mosfilm
- Release date: 13 December 1971
- Running time: 87 minutes
- Country: USSR
- Language: Russian
- Box office: 65.02 million tickets

Gentlemen of Fortune (Russian: Джентльмены удачи, romanized: Dzhentlmeny udachi) is a 1971 Soviet crime comedy-drama film, filmed at Mosfilm and directed by Aleksandr Sery. The stars of the film include famous Soviet actors such as Yevgeny Leonov, Georgy Vitsin, Savely Kramarov and Radner Muratov.

The film was the leader of Soviet distribution in 1972, drawing 65.02 million box office admissions.

== Plot ==
During the autumn of 1970, in one of the Central Asian Soviet Republics, three criminals steal Alexander the Great's golden helmet from the excavation site of an archaeological expedition. These criminals are quickly identified by police: they are Aleksandr Belyi (Yevgeny Leonov), aka Docent (literally associate professor), a ruthless big-shot criminal, and his two henchmen Fyodor Yermakov aka Crosseyes (Savely Kramarov) and Gavrila Sheremetyev aka Sad Sack (Georgy Vitsin). In Moscow, the head of the expedition, Professor Maltsev, encounters a man who looks exactly like Docent, and follows his lead. The man turns out to be Yevgeny Troshkin, an amiable principal of Kindergarten № 83, and a WWII veteran (also played by Yevgeny Leonov).

The misunderstanding is cleared up, but pretty soon, the police recall Troshkin once again: they have already caught all three thieves, but the criminals had no helmet on hands. The police persuade Troshkin to use his resemblance to Docent to find the stolen helmet. He is disguised with a toupee and fake tattoos, and sent to a Central Asian prison where Docent's accomplices are serving sentences, while their boss is imprisoned separately near Moscow. In order to be convincing, Troshkin, a well-educated and good-natured man, has to learn slang and manners of criminals.

Troshkin passes off as Docent and feeds Crosseyes and Sad Sack his fake alibi, under which, he hit his head and partially lost his memory, forgetting where his helmet was hidden. It turns out that both criminals know little about Docent's connections and plans and, not being from Moscow themselves, they cannot name the place where Docent has been and where they last saw the helmet. The police decide to arrange a mock escape for the trio; Troshkin will then have to bring them back to Moscow to continue the search for the helmet.

The trio are supposed to get into an empty cement truck, which would transport them to a place where Troshkin's given enough money for the operation. By accident, they get into a wrong truck, and end up far away from the meeting point, with all their clothes covered in cement, and are forced to run in their underwear to the local town posing as a track team. Moreover, a local petty crook named Vasiliy Alibabayevich Alibaba (Radner Muratov) escapes along with them, and they have to let him tag along out of fear of being uncovered.

At the local town, Troshkin and the gang stay at a hotel, where, after a botched game of chess, Crosseyes and Sad Sack get into a fight. Troshkin comes in time, breaks them apart and orders the gang to stop causing misdemeanor and using criminal slang and nicknames, so they would at least look and act like ordinary people and stay safe. Then Troshkin gets a hauling job at a local kindergarten to earn some money for new clothes and for a hotel stay, but tries to make it look for his accomplices like they're performing a robbery, so they won't suspect him. Alibabayevich feels remorse after the job and wishes to surrender to the police, but is afraid to do it so they won't give him a severe punishment for what he has committed up until now. After meeting with the police once again, Troshkin gets some money and new clothes, and also asks the police to free his gang from prison sentence for being helpful.

Arriving in Moscow, the gang settles in an old house, prepared for demolition. While Troshkin, Crosseyes and Sad Sack travel around Moscow to find any clues, Vasiliy Alibabaevich keeps their home. Later, Sad Sack steals Troshkin's money, which forces him to take some more from his own apartment, again making it look like a robbery to his accomplices. Then Alibabayevich accidentally sets fire to the gang's house, after which Troshkin, having agreed with Professor Maltsev, moves with the gang to Maltsev's country house. Professor's daughter, Lyudmila, comes to visit them, thinking they're archeologists, after Maltsev himself told her so.

Gradually, Troshkin outlines the circle of communication of the real Docent. One of the former accomplices declares to him that he has quit the life of crime, and throws Troshkin down the staircase. Another accomplice, Prokhorov the cloakroom attendant, arranges a meeting at the square near the Bolshoi Theatre. Prokhorov sends his accomplice Mityai to Troshkin, whom he does not recognize. Both become convinced that the man is not the real Docent and Prokhorov decides not to go to the meeting. Both are convinced that Troshkin is an undercover agent, i.e. a cop. Prokhorov quits his job and hides in Mityai's apartment.

Police officers inform Troshkin that the real Docent has broken out of the prison near Moscow and is probably going to track down his henchmen, so the operation must be immediately halted. Troshkin asks for a permission to stay with the gang to celebrate the New Year: being in such company for a long time, he made a decision to awaken the criminals' conscience and make them outthink their lives, even if he had to do it without losing the crime boss masquerade. At Maltsev's country house, during a chime of the New Year's Eve, Troshkin makes a speech generally not typical for a bandit, however these words-of-beauty do not even satisfy the gang: they consider his speech to be simply a cover of a new crime and recall Docent's past atrocities.

Meanwhile, the real Docent comes to Mityai's place, where he meets Prokhorov. Both assume that he's the same fake Docent, or a law enforcement agent they've encountered earlier. Docent asks them to give him a hideout. Under this pretext, Mityai and Prokhorov lure him to the roof of an apartment building under construction, where Mityai tries to stab Docent, but the latter kills Mityai by pushing him off the roof. Prokhorov pulls out a gun which later turns out to be in Docent's hands, which means, he has easily won the fight.

Back at the country house, Troshkin gives the gang presents, and also hands Sad Sack a letter from his relatives, which Troshkin received during a meeting with the police. The criminals are getting more and more annoyed at the concept of Docent bossing them around, threatening them with violence and, as they see it, only prolonging their potential prison sentences with crime schemes. Sad Sack, having read the letter and unable of standing the torments of conscience, attempts suicide but fails. After the ambulance leaves, a fear raises among the criminals that the doctor will have the police informed of them, but Troshkin lies to them that he has supposedly killed the doctor to leave no witnesses. This makes the last straw for Alibabayevich and the other criminals, and they decide to subdue "Docent" and voluntarily surrender to justice.

Troshkin, feeling unhappy with his masquerade, finally tries to reveal himself to the gang, but they quickly bound and gag him. Crosseyes swears to cut ties with the crime world after he's released from prison, and recalls how, before the arrest, Docent made him to dive into an ice-hole at the lake for some reason. Immediately, Sad Sack realises that the stolen helmet is hidden in the lake, and the trio sets off to the local boat station, where the real Docent finds them, armed with a knife. He orders Crosseyes to retrieve the helmet from an ice-hole, then takes it and leaves, forcing the gang to take care of the naked Crosseyes. At the same time, Professor Maltsev's daughter arrives at the country house to visit the so-called archeologists once again. Troshkin takes her car, rushes to the boat station and comes face to face with his criminal doppelganger. After a short fight, Crosseyes, Sad Sack and Vasiliy Alibabayevich knock out Docent and then Troshkin with an oar, and decide to turn them both in to the police, believing that two Docents will reduce their prison sentences much more than one.

The police take both Docents away, and Professor Maltsev finally gets his precious helmet back. Then the police cars leave, while Crosseyes, Sad Sack and Vasiliy Alibabayevich are left standing there, not having a clue why the police have not taken them away as well. At that time, one of the cars stops and Troshkin comes out, this time without the toupee. Seeing this, the trio runs away in shock down the road (thinking that he has been "shaved clean" for prison and projecting that the same fate awaits them) while Troshkin chases after them to say goodbye.

== Cast ==
- Yevgeny Leonov as Yevgeny Ivanovich Troshkin / Aleksandr Aleksandrovich "Docent" Beliy
- Georgy Vitsin as Gavrila Petrovich "Sad Sack" Sheremetyev
- Savely Kramarov as Fyodor Petrovich "Crosseyes" Yermakov
- Radner Muratov as Vasily Alibabayevich Alibaba
- Erast Garin as Professor Nikolai Maltsev, archeologist
- Natalya Fateyeva as Lyudmila Maltseva, professor's daughter
- Oleg Vidov as Lieutenant Slavin
- Nikolay Olyalin as Colonel Verchenko
- Anatoli Papanov as chess player in hotel
- Lyubov Sokolova as kindergarten principal
- Pavel Shpringfeld as Prokhorov the cloakroom attendant in theater, criminal (partly voiced by Viktor Fainleib)
- Aleksei Vanin as reformed criminal (voiced by Oleg Mokshantsev)
- Zoya Vasilkova as Masha the sweeper woman
- Roman Filippov as Nikola (Nicky) of Peter (vulgar name for Saint-Petersburg), brutal guy in jail
- Anatoly Yabbarov as Mityai, criminal
- Galina Mikeladze as street singer (singing voice by Larisa Mondrus)

== Production ==
The film was directed by Aleksandr Sery who had just come out of prison. Georgiy Daneliya assisted him and wrote the script. Sery used his prison experience to design many situations in the movie, and he also introduced numerous expressions from Russian criminal slang (known as fenya).

== In culture ==
A monument to Leonov as starring in Gentlemen of Fortune was installed in Moscow at the Mosfilmovskaya Street in 2001. In 2015 it was stolen for scrap metal and destroyed. A copy was installed in 2016.

As with other cult films, a number of catchphrases from the film entered Russian culture. Of particular note is the criminal slang used in film; much of this slang was actually invented for the film and later became widespread, such as "нехороший человек: 'редиска'" ("bad man: 'radish' "). The latter term was used jokingly even by Vladimir Putin: "When a radiator battery drops on your foot, say 'Radish!', rather than use obscene language".
