= Galina Volchek =

Russian actress (1933–2019)

- Галина Волчек
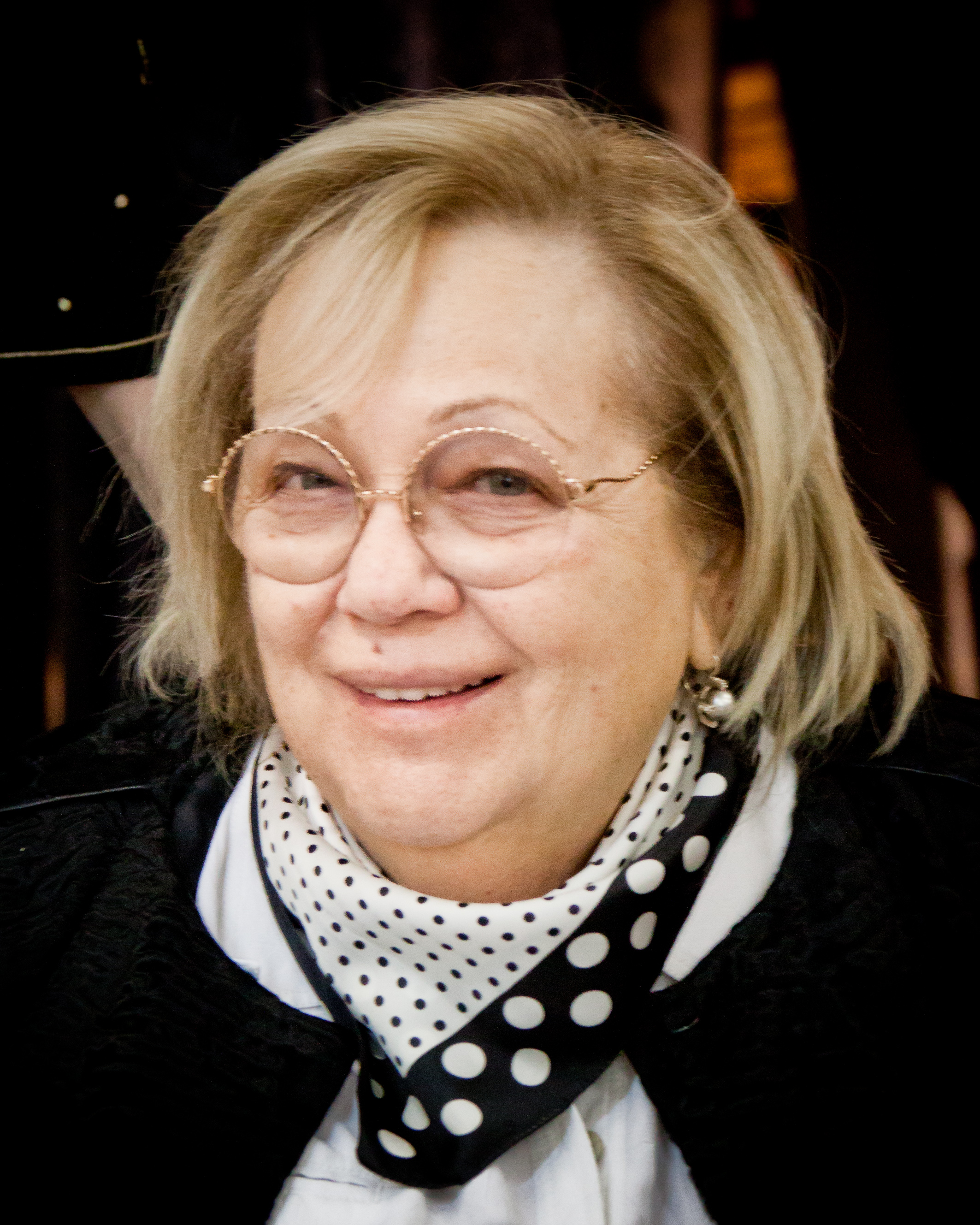
- Volchek in 2013
- Born: Galina Berovna Volchek; 19 December 1933; Moscow, RSFSR, Soviet Union
- Died: 26 December 2019 (aged 86); Moscow, Russia
- Occupations: Actress, theater director, pedagogue
- Years active: 1953–2019
- Awards: USSR State Prize; People's Artist of the USSR; Order "For Merit to the Fatherland" (full cavalier)

Galina Borisovna (Berovna) Volchek (Russian: Гали́на Бори́совна Во́лчек; 19 December 1933 – 26 December 2019) was a Soviet and Russian stage and film actress, theater director and pedagogue. People's Artist of the USSR (1989) and Hero of Labour of the Russian Federation (2017).

== Biography ==
Galina Volchek was a daughter of the cameraman and director Boris (Ber) Volchek. After finishing the Moscow Art Theatre School (1955, Karev course) she co-founded the Sovremennik Theatre, together with Igor Kvasha, Oleg Tabakov, Oleg Yefremov and Yevgeny Yevstigneyev. Since 1972 she was the chief director of the theater, and since 1989 its artistic director. Volchek directed over thirty productions. Among them were Russian and world classics, works of contemporary domestic and foreign authors.

She was repeatedly invited to productions in theaters in Germany, Finland, Ireland, the US, Hungary, Poland and other countries. She was engaged many times in theater pedagogy activities abroad.

Volchek was elected a deputy into the State Duma in 1995, where she became a member of the Committee on Culture. In 1999, Volchek left the parliament.

On 26 December 2019, Volchek died in Moscow from pneumonia, one week after her 86th birthday.

== Personal life ==
Galina Volchek said: I had two husbands, several romances and one fallacy. She was married twice:

- First husband: Yevgeny Yevstigneyev. The marriage lasted for 9 years, after she initiated divorce proceedings.
  - The son Denis Yevstigneyev (born 1961), filmmaker.
- Second husband: a doctor of technical sciences, professor of Moscow State University of Civil Engineering Mark Abelev, winner of the State Prize of the Soviet Union. Also divorced.

== Selected filmography ==
Year	Title	Role	Notes
1957	Don Quixote	Maritornes	
1965	The Bridge Is Built	Rimma Sinayskaya	
1966	Beware of the Car	Tape recorder buyer (uncredited)	
1970	King Lear	Regan	
1976	The Little Mermaid	Inn Hostess / Witch	
1977	About the Little Red Riding Hood	Mother Wolf	TV movie
1979	Autumn Marathon	Varvara Nikitichna	

== Awards and honors ==
- USSR State Prize (1967)
- Honored Artist of the RSFSR (1969)
- Order of the Red Banner of Labour (1976)
- People's Artist of the RSFSR (1979)
- People's Artist of the USSR (1989)
- Order of Friendship of Peoples (1993)
- Full cavalier of the Order "For Merit to the Fatherland"
- Order of Merit (Ukraine), 3rd class (2004)
- Order of Merit of the Republic of Poland (2004)
- Hero of Labour of the Russian Federation (2017)

== Gallery ==
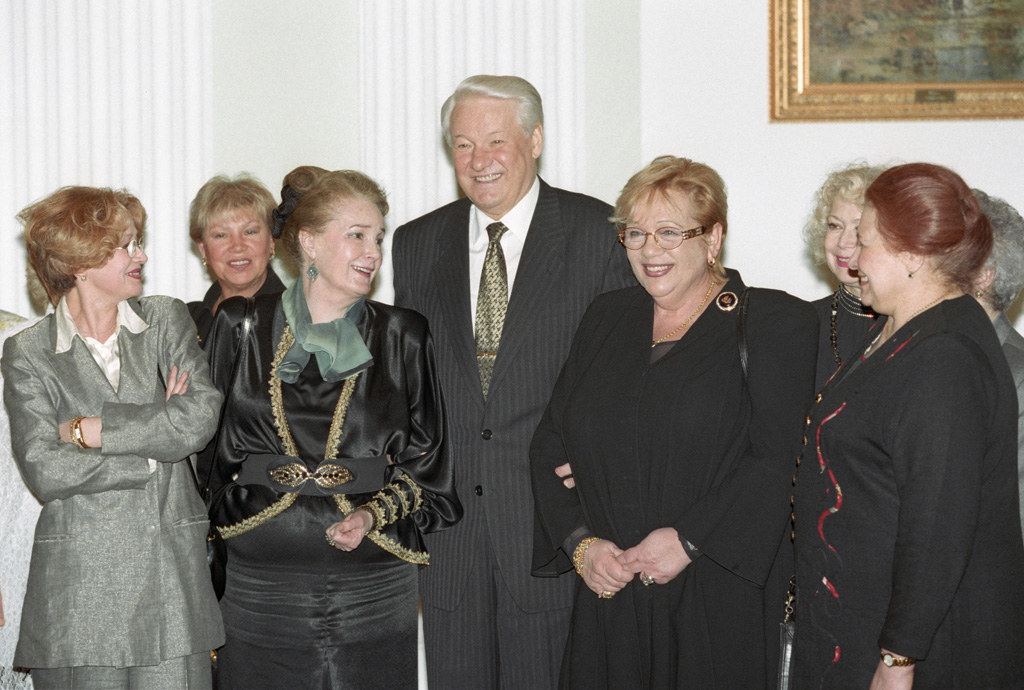
With Boris Yeltsin on 8 March 1998

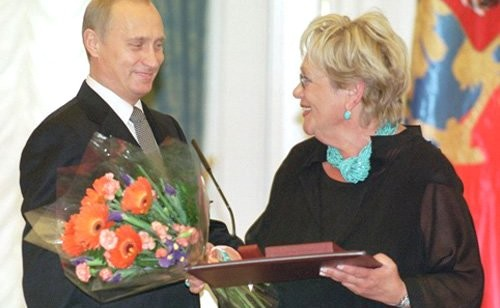
Presentation of the State Prize, 12 June 2002

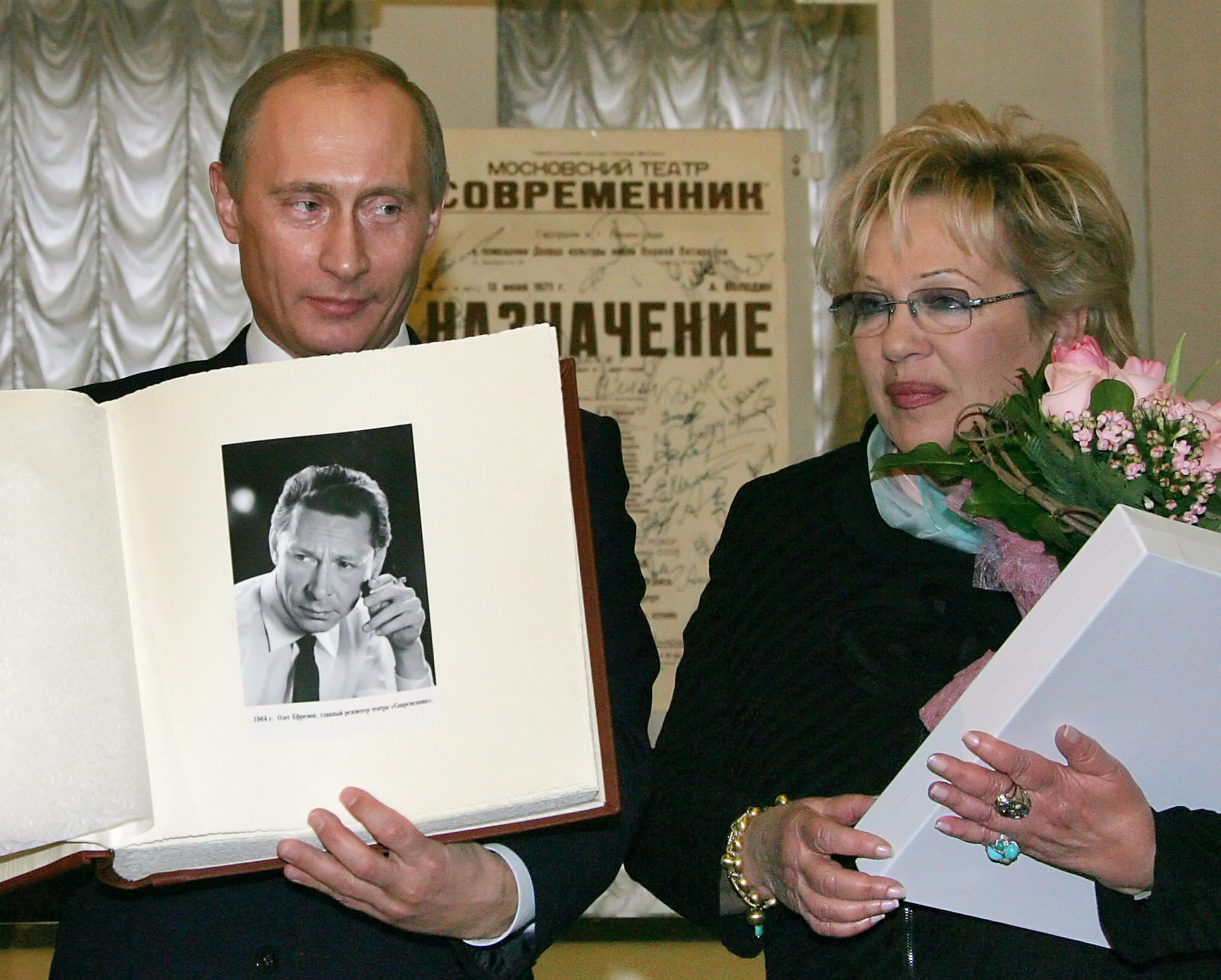
With Vladimir Putin on 50th anniversary of Sovremennik, 14 April 2006

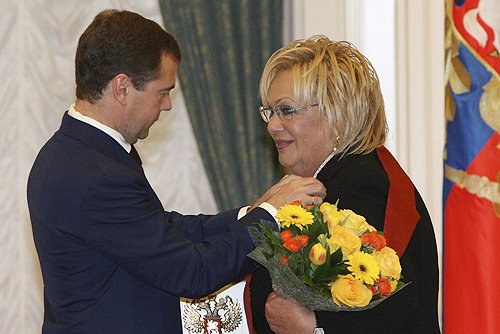
Presentation of the Order "For Merit to the Fatherland" 1st class, 23 December 2008

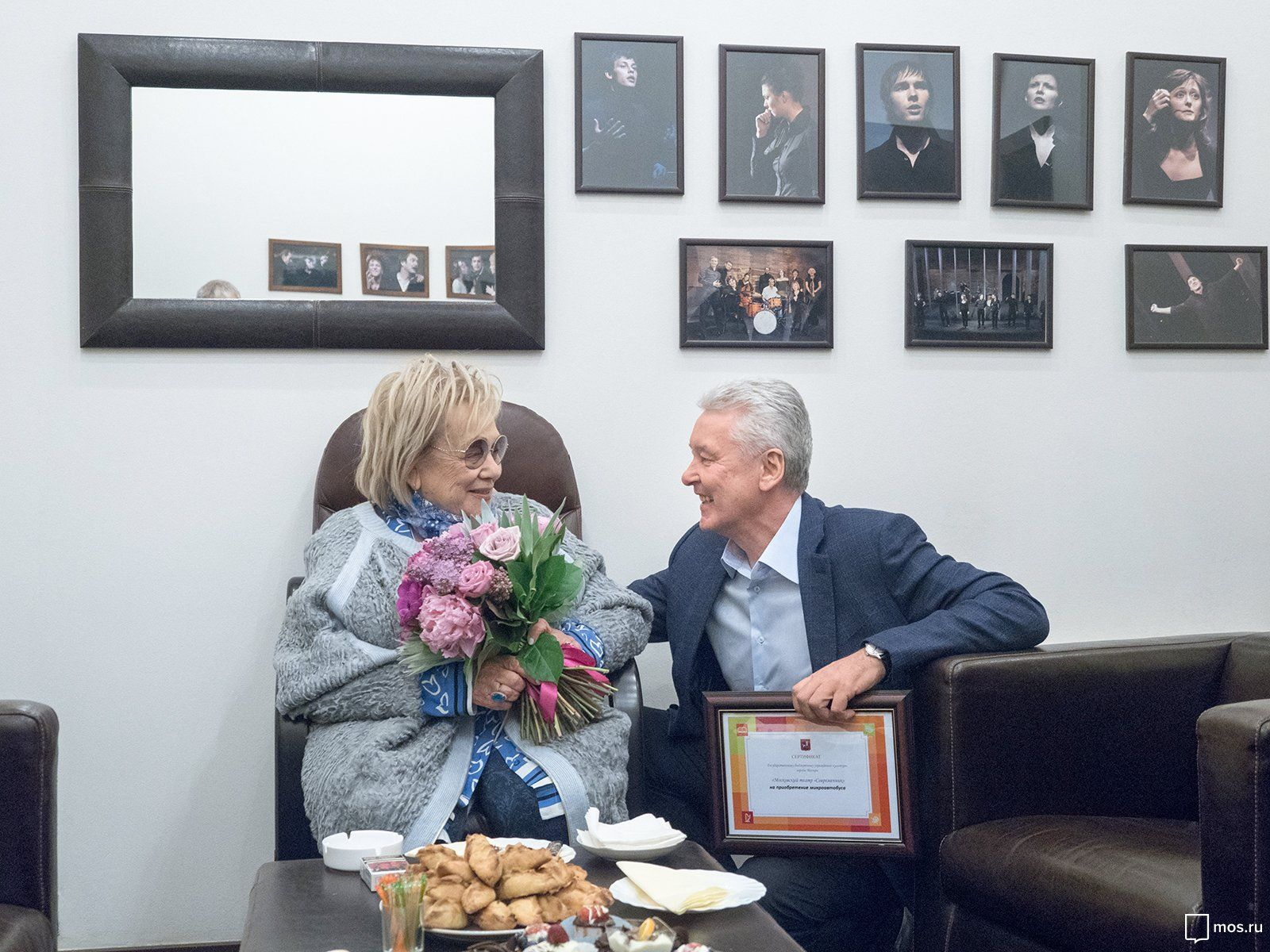
With Sergey Sobyanin, 16 April 2018
