= Igor Kvasha =

Russian actor (1933–2012)

- Игорь Кваша
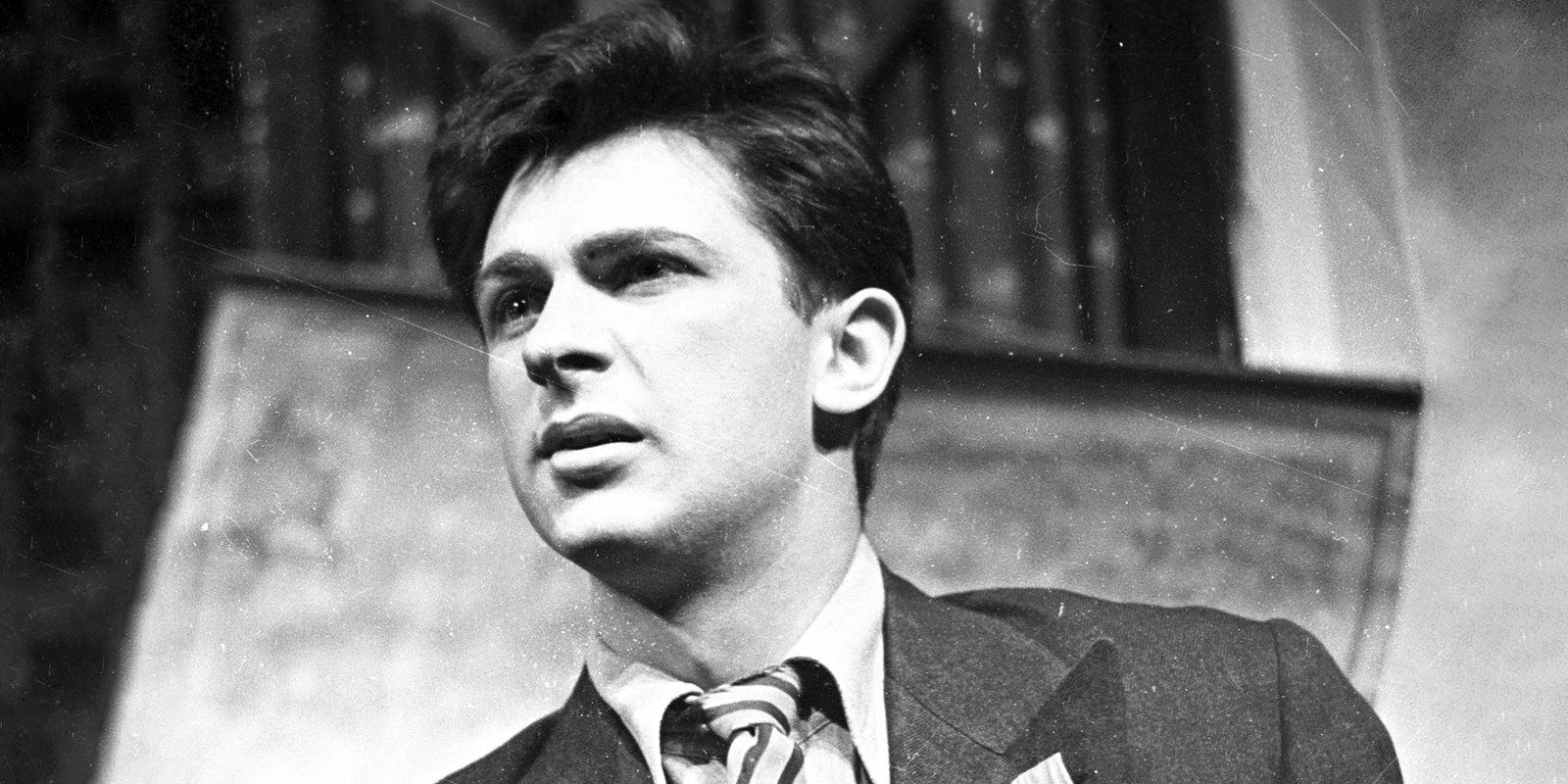
- Kvasha in the 1960s
- Born: Igor Vladimirovich Kvasha; 4 February 1933; Moscow, Soviet Union
- Died: 30 August 2012 (aged 79); Moscow, Russia
- Resting place: Troyekurovskoye Cemetery, Moscow
- Occupation: Actor
- Years active: 1961–2012

Igor Vladimirovich Kvasha (Russian: Игорь Владимирович Кваша; 4 February 1933 — 30 August 2012) was a Soviet and Russian theater and film actor. He was a leading actor of Sovremennik Theater. Igor Kvasha was one of the Sovremennik founders along with Galina Volchek, Oleg Yefremov, Yevgeniy Yevstigneyev and Oleg Tabakov. He was honored with People's Artist of Russia in 1978.

== Biography ==
Igor Kvasha was born in Moscow, the son of scientist Vladimir Ilich Kvasha, of the faculty of Mendeleev Russian University of Chemistry and Technology. Kvasha graduated from the Moscow Art Theater School, where he was taught by Aleksander Karev. After graduation, he joined the Moscow Art Theater troupe and performed there for two years (1955-1957). In 1957 he started work at the newly established Sovremennik Theater, where he remained.

In his last years, Kvasha hosted the TV talk show Wait for Me (Russian: Жди меня) on Russia's Channel One. Kvasha himself acknowledges that he has got there accidentally.

He died in Moscow at the age of 79.

== Political views ==
In the spring of 2001, Kvasha spoke in support of the journalistic team of the NTV channel and criticized the actions of President Vladimir Putin. In October 2008, he signed an open letter of appeal in defense and support of the release of Yukos Oil Company lawyer Svetlana Bakhmina. In December 2011, he criticized Dmitry Medvedev, Vladimir Putin and United Russia, calling for a protest rally on 24 December against electoral fraud.

== Selected filmography ==
- Sergeant Fetisov as Tavrizyan (1961)
- Adventures of a Dentist as Merezhkovsky (1965)
- Property of the Republic as Lagutin, ataman (1972)
- The Straw Hat as Lieutenant Emil Tavernier (1975)
- The Flight of Mr. McKinley as Director of SB-Salvatory (1975)
- Forever Alive as Vladimir (1976)
- The Very Same Munchhausen as burgomaster (1979)
- A Man from the Boulevard des Capucines as pastor Adams (1987)
- Passport as Rabbi (1990)
- The Master and Margarita as Stravinsky (1994)
- Turning (2002) as father
- The First Circle as Joseph Stalin (2006)
- The White Guard as narrator (2012)
- Ku! Kin-dza-dza as Yk, a carousel owner (2013)

== Honours and awards ==
- Order For Merit to the Fatherland, 3rd class (30 March 2006) - for outstanding contribution to the development of theatre and many years of creative activity
- People's Artist of the USSR (1968)
- By the President of the Russian Federation (25 January 2008) - for his contribution to the development of Russian theater and film [6]
- National Prize actor Andrei Mironov "Figaro" in the "For Service to the Fatherland theatre"
