= Autumn Marathon =

1979 Russian film by Georgiy Daneliya

- Original film poster
- Directed by: Georgiy Daneliya
- Written by: Aleksandr Volodin
- Starring: Oleg Basilashvili; Natalya Gundareva; Yevgeni Leonov; Marina Neyolova
- Cinematography: Sergei Vronsky
- Edited by: Tatyana Yegorychyova
- Music by: Andrei Petrov
- Production company: Mosfilm
- Release date: 23 November 1979
- Running time: 90 minutes
- Country: Soviet Union
- Language: Russian

Autumn Marathon (Russian: Осенний марафон, romanized: Osenniy marafon) is a 1979 Soviet romantic comedy-drama, a winner of the 1979 Venice Film Festival, San Sebastian Film Festival and 1980 Berlin Film Festival awards in the best director and best actor categories. It was also selected as the Soviet entry for the Best Foreign Language Film at the 52nd Academy Awards, but was not accepted as a nominee.

It starred Oleg Basilashvili as Andrei Buzykin, a married English-to-Russian translator in Leningrad who is going through a mid-life crisis and struggling to stand up for himself in his tangled relationships with his wife, mistress, neighbors, and co-workers. The cast included such notable Soviet performers as Yevgeny Leonov, Natalya Gundareva, Marina Neyolova, Borislav Brondukov, Nikolai Kryuchkov, and Galina Volchek. It was directed by Georgiy Daneliya.

== Plot ==
In Leningrad, Andrey Buzykin is a middle-aged translator and university lecturer torn between his wife, Nina, and his younger lover, Alla, who wants him to start a family with her. Nina silently endures Andrey’s infidelity as he tries to keep up appearances and provides increasingly implausible excuses. Andrey’s indecision and inability to refuse others also affect his professional life, where he gets roped into situations against his will. For instance, he unwillingly joins his Danish colleague, Professor Hansen, on morning runs and is exploited by his former classmate Varvara, who also interferes in his personal affairs. Andrey’s work suffers, leading to missed deadlines and a tarnished reputation. Alla grows frustrated with his hesitation and tries to end their affair.

As his marriage unravels, Andrey and Nina's daughter, Lena, leaves with her husband on a two-year work trip without consulting her parents, which comes as a great shock to Nina. In a moment of honesty, Andrey confesses his ended affair to Nina, who takes this for another lie and runs off, leaving home. Andrey, now determined to stand up for himself, confronts Varvara at work, denies a lazy student a pass, and bluntly refuses to shake hands with a colleague he dislikes.

Returning home to find Nina gone, Andrey feels a sense of relief, before Alla calls him and Nina unexpectedly returns, asking if he is truly done with his double life. In the final scene, Andrey runs through the darkening city streets alongside Hansen.

== Cast ==
- Oleg Basilashvili as Andrey Pavlovich Buzykin
- Natalya Gundareva as Nina Yevlampyevna Buzykina
- Marina Neyolova as Alla Mikhaylovna Yermakova – Buzykin's Mistress
- Yevgeny Leonov as Vasily Ignatyevich Kharitonov – Buzykin's Neighbour
- Norbert Kuchinke as Bill Hansen, a Danish professor of Slavic studies
- Nikolai Kryuchkov as Uncle Kolya, Alla's Neighbour
- Galina Volchek as Varvara Nikitichna, Buzykin's colleague, translator
- Olga Bogdanova as Yelena – Buzykin's Daughter

== See also ==
- List of submissions to the 52nd Academy Awards for Best Foreign Language Film
- List of Soviet submissions for the Academy Award for Best Foreign Language Film
