= Shine, Shine, My Star (film) =

- Directed by: Alexander Mitta
- Written by: Yuli Dunsky; Alexander Mitta; Valeri Frid
- Starring: Oleg Tabakov; Oleg Yefremov; Elena Proklova; Yevgeny Leonov; Leonid Kuravlyov
- Cinematography: Yuri Sokol
- Edited by: Nadezhda Veselyovskaya
- Music by: Boris Chaikovsky
- Production company: Mosfilm
- Release date: 1970
- Running time: 94 minutes
- Country: Soviet Union
- Language: Russian

Shine, Shine, My Star (Russian: Гори, гори, моя звезда, romanized: Gori, gori moya zvezda) is a 1970 comedy-drama film directed by Alexander Mitta.

== Plot ==
Events in the film take place during the Russian Civil War. In a small provincial town, at first come to power the red, then the white and then the green. The protagonist is the self-taught theater director Vladimir Iskremas (a pseudonym, which is an abbreviation of "Iskusstvo — revoljucionnym massam" – "Art - for the revolutionary masses") stages the tragedy of Joan of Arc. He is obsessed with the ideas of theater and its transformation under the new revolutionary art.

== Cast ==
- Oleg Tabakov as Vladimir Iskremas
- Elena Proklova as Christina Kotlyarenko (The Rat)
- Yevgeny Leonov as Pashka, the host of the illusion
- Oleg Yefremov as Fyodor, artist-autodidact
- Vladimir Naumov as Staff Captain
- Leonid Dyachkov as Ohrim
- Leonid Kuravlyov as Commissioner Serdyuk
- Marlen Khutsiev as Prince
- Konstantin Voinov as white officer
- Boris Boldyrevsky
- Alexander Milyutin as guard
- Aleksandr Porokhovshchikov as white officer
- Lyubov Sokolova as wife of Fyodor
- Aleksandr Filippenko as white officer
- Anatoly Eliseev as Vakhromeev, murderer of Fyodor
- Tatyana Nepomnyashchaya as Margarita Vlasevna, dancer
- Lyudmila Khmelnitskaya as Anyuta, a tall dancer
- Irina Murzaeva as Tapera
- Pavel Vinnik as husband in the silent cinema
- Mikaela Drozdovskaya as wife of the staff captain
- Nonna Mordyukova as Madame
- Rogvold Sukhoverko as assistant of Ohrim (not in the credits)

== Production ==
At first Rolan Bykov was supposed to play Iskremas. But after he starred in the prohibited 1967 film Commissar, the actor was listed as "disgraced" and Oleg Tabakov was hired for the role instead. The working title of the picture, Comedy about Iskremas, was not accepted by the commission at acceptance of the picture. Mitta came up with the new name Shine, Shine, My Star - coinciding with the famous romance. In the episodic roles of white officers in the film three notable Soviet film directors were cast: Vladimir Naumov, Marlen Khutsiev and Konstantin Voinov.
