= Aleksandr Volodin (playwright) =

Soviet and Russian playwright, screenwriter and poet

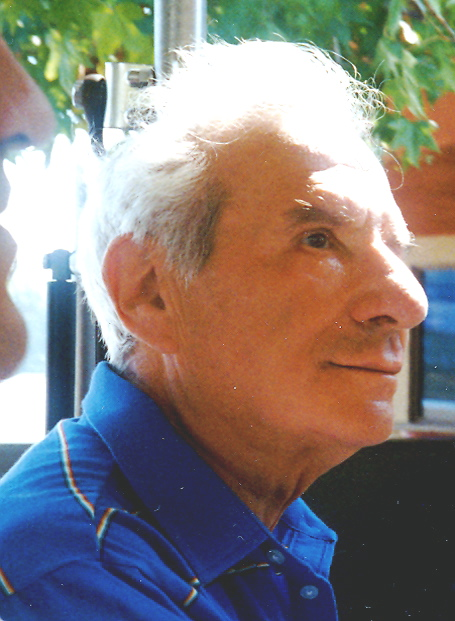
- Born: Aleksandr Moiseyevich Lifschitz; 10 February 1919; Minsk, Socialist Soviet Republic of Byelorussia
- Died: 17 December 2001 (aged 82); Saint Petersburg, Russia
- Resting place: Komarovskoye Cemetery, Saint Petersburg

Aleksandr Moiseyevich Volodin (Russian: Александр Моисеевич Володин; 1919 – 2001), born Lifschitz, was a Soviet and Russian playwright, screenwriter and poet. His first play was The Factory Girl (1956). His most famous plays were Five Evenings (1959), My Elder Sister and some others. In addition, he created the script for the film Autumn Marathon (1979) by director Georgy Daneliya.
