= Giya Kancheli =

Georgian composer (1935–2019)

Gia Kancheli გია ყანჩელი PAU
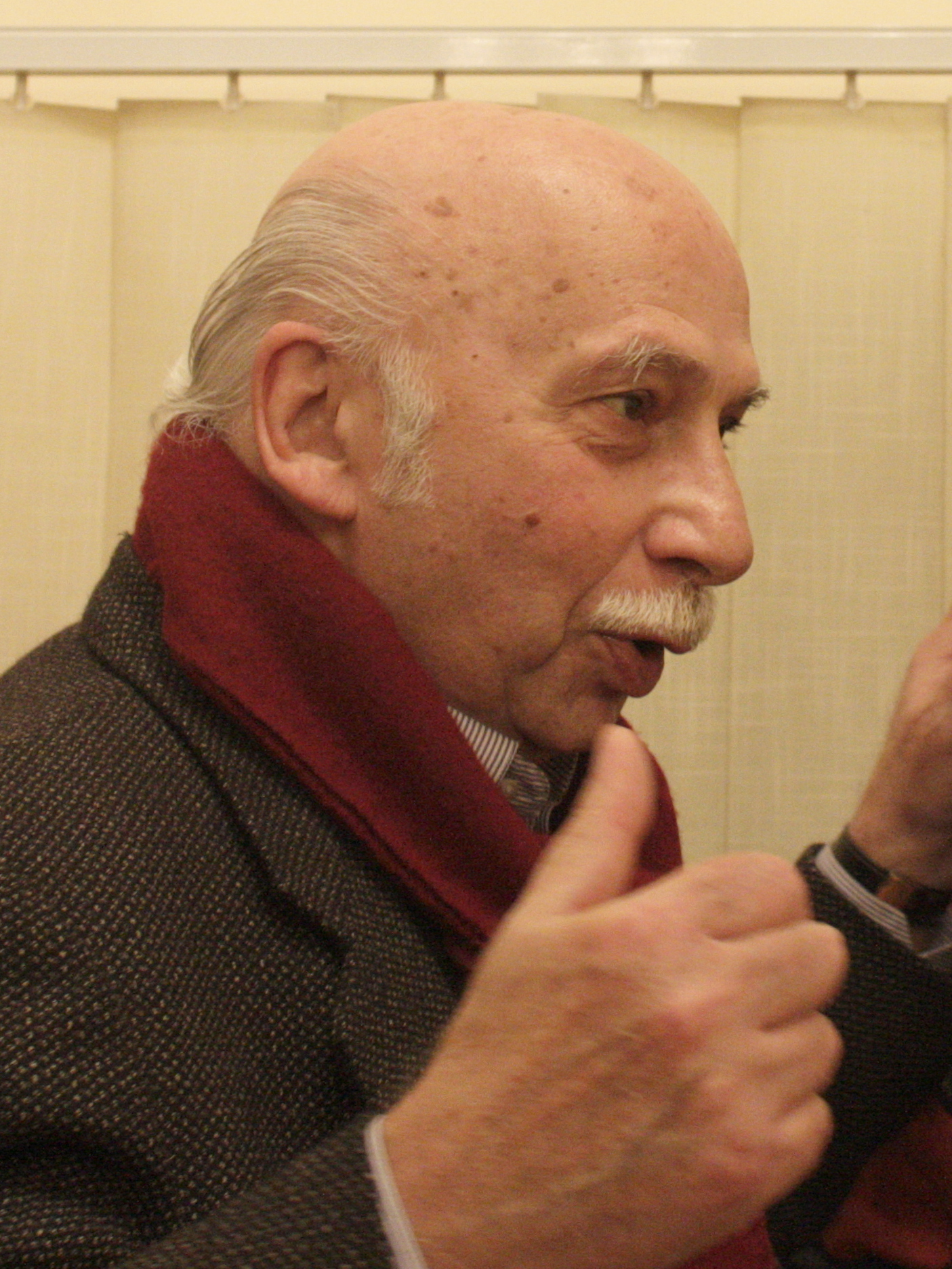
- Kancheli in 2010

Background information
- Born: 10 August 1935; Tiflis, Georgian SSR, Transcaucasian SFSR, USSR
- Died: 2 October 2019 (aged 84) Tbilisi
- Genres: Soundtrack, classical music
- Occupation: Composer
- Instruments: Piano, keyboard, synthesizer
- Years active: 1961–2019
- Awards: People's Artist of the USSR; Shota Rustaveli Prize (1981); USSR State Prize (1976)

Gia Kancheli (Georgian: გია ყანჩელი; 10 August 1935 – 2 October 2019) was a Georgian composer. He was born in Tbilisi, Georgia, and resided in Belgium in later life.

After the dissolution of the Soviet Union in 1991, Kancheli lived first in Berlin, and from 1995 in Antwerp, where he became composer-in-residence for the Royal Flemish Philharmonic. He died in Tbilisi at age 84.

== Life ==
In his symphonies, Kancheli's musical language typically consists of slow scraps of minor-mode melody against long, subdued, anguished string discords. Rodion Shchedrin called Kancheli "an ascetic with the temperament of a maximalist; a restrained Vesuvius".

Kancheli wrote seven symphonies, and what he termed a liturgy for viola and orchestra, Mourned by the Wind. The Philadelphia Orchestra under Yuri Temirkanov gave the American premiere of his Fourth Symphony in 1978, not long before the cultural freeze in the United States against Soviet culture. Glasnost allowed Kancheli to regain exposure, and he began to receive frequent commissions, as well as performances in Europe and North America.

Championed internationally by Lera Auerbach, Dennis Russell Davies, Jansug Kakhidze, Gidon Kremer, Yuri Bashmet, Kim Kashkashian, Mstislav Rostropovich, and the Kronos Quartet, Kancheli saw world premieres of his works in Seattle, as well as with the New York Philharmonic under Kurt Masur. He continued to receive regular commissions. Recordings of his works are regularly released, notably on the ECM label.

His work Styx is for solo viola, chorus and orchestra. It is a farewell to his friends Avet Terterian and Alfred Schnittke, whose names the chorus sings during the piece.

For two decades, Kancheli was the music director of the Rustaveli Theatre in Tbilisi. He composed an opera, Music for the Living, in collaboration with Rustaveli director Robert Sturua, and in 1999, the opera was restaged for the Deutsches National Theater in Weimar.

He wrote music for films such as Georgiy Daneliya's science fiction film Kin-dza-dza! (1986) and its 2013 animated remake.

== Works ==
=== Stage ===
- Music for the living, opera in two acts (1982–1984)

=== Orchestral ===
- Symphonies
  - Symphony No. 1 (1967)
  - Symphony No. 2 "Songs" (1970)
  - Symphony No. 3 (1973)
  - Symphony No. 4 "To the Memory of Michelangelo" (1974)
  - Symphony No. 5 "To the Memory of My Parents" (1977)
  - Symphony No. 6 (1978–1980)
  - Symphony No. 7 "Epilogue" (1986)
- Concerto for Orchestra (1961)
- Mourned by the Wind (Vom Winde beweint), liturgy for viola (or cello) and orchestra (1989)
- Morning Prayers for chamber orchestra and tape (1990)
- Abii ne viderem ("I turned away so as not to see") for alto flute / viola, piano and string orchestra (1992–1994)
- Another Step... (Noch Einen Schritt...) (1992)
- Wingless (1993)
- Magnum Ignotum (1994)
- Trauerfarbenes Land (1994)
- Lament, Music of Mourning in Memory of Luigi Nono (1994)
- Simi, "Joyless Thoughts", for cello and orchestra (1995)
- ...à la Duduki (1995)
- V & V (1995)
- Valse Boston for piano and strings (1996)
- Diplipito (1997)
- Childhood Revisited (Besuch In Der Kindheit) (1998)
- Sio for strings, piano and percussion (1998)
- Rokwa (1999)
- And Farewell Goes Out Sighing... (1999)
- A Little Daneliade (2000)
- ...al Niente (2000)
- Ergo (2000)
- Don’t Grieve (2001)
- Fingerprints (2002)
- Lonesome – 2 great Slava from 2 GKs (2002)
- Warzone (2002)
- Twilight (2004)
- Ex Contrario (2006)
- Kapote (2006)
- Silent Prayer (2007)
- Broken Chant (2007)
- Ilori (2010)
- Lingering for large orchestra (2012)
- Nu.Mu.Zu (I don't know) (2015)
- Letters to Friends (2016)
- Music for Wind Quintet and Orchestra (2016)

=== Chamber ===
- Wind Quintet (1961)
- Night Prayers for string quartet (1992–1995)
- Caris Mere (After the wind) for soprano and viola (1994)
- Magnum Ignotum for wind ensemble and tape (1994)
- Instead of a Tango for violin, bandoneon, piano and double bass (1996)
- Time... and Again for violin and piano (1996)
- In L'Istesso Tempo for piano quartet (1997)
- Ninna Nanna for flute and string quartet (2008)
- Chiaroscuro for string quartet (2011)
- Wind Quintet (2013)
- Rag-GIDON-time for violin and piano (1995)

=== Choral/Vocal ===
- Light Sorrow, music for orchestra, boys' choir and two boy sopranos (for the 40th anniversary of the victory over fascism) (1984)
- Midday Prayers for soprano, clarinet and chamber orchestra (1990)
- Evening Prayers, for eight alto voices and chamber orchestra (1991)
- Psalm 23, for soprano and chamber orchestra (1993)
- Lament, concerto for violin, soprano and orchestra (1994)
- Diplipito, for cello, counter-tenor and chamber orchestra (1997)
- And Farewell Goes Out Sighing... for violin, countertenor and orchestra (1999)
- Styx, for viola, mixed choir and orchestra (1999)
- Little Imber (Kancheli), for solo voice, children's and men's choirs and small ensemble (2003)
- Amao Omi, for SATB choir and saxophone quartet (2005)
- Lulling the Sun, for six-part mixed choir and percussion (2008)
- Dixi, for mixed choir and orchestra (2009)

== Filmography ==
- 1964 – Children of the Sea
- 1965 – Gold (Animated film)
- 1967 – Melancholy Romance
- 1968 – Extraordinary Exhibition
- 1968 – Don't Grieve
- 1970 – Competition
- 1970 – Feola (short)
- 1970 – The Jug (short)
- 1971 – Neighbour
- 1972 – When Almonds Blossomed
- 1972 – White Stones (short)
- 1972 – Gladiator (short)
- 1973 – Record
- 1974 – The Eccentrics (with Jansug Kakhidze)
- 1974 – Captains
- 1974 – Night Visit (with Revaz Lagidze)
- 1974 – Magic Egg (animated film)
- 1975 – Caucasian Prisoner
- 1975 – Caucasian Romance
- 1977 – Stepmother of Samanishvili (with Jansug Kakhidze)
- 1977 – Mimino
- 1977 – Cinema
- 1978 – Some Interviews on Personal Matters
- 1978 – Khanuma
- 1978 – Caucasian Story
- 1979 – Dumas in Caucasia
- 1979 – Ground of Ancestors
- 1980 – Earth, This Is Your Son
- 1983 – Blue Mountains
- 1984 – Day Is Longer Than Night
- 1986 – Kin-dza-dza!
- 1987 – King Lear
- 1988 – Life of Don Quixote and Sancho Panza
- 1990 – Oh, This Horrible TV
- 1990 – Passport
- 1998 – Silver Heads
- 2004 – National Bomb
- 2009 – Happiness
- 2010 – Felicita
- 2010 – After the Mountains
- 2011 – The Tree of Life
- 2012 – Ku! Kin-dza-dza (animated film)

=== Played in films ===
- 2001 – Giya Kancheli (Documentary)
- 2011 – Giya Kancheli. Life in sounds (Documentary)
- 2012 – Mimino - Secret Soviet movie (Documentary)
- 2012 – Georgiy Daneliya (Documentary)
- 2014 – Goodbye to Language
- 2016 – Voyage of Time

== Sources ==
- Kennedy, Michael (2006), The Oxford Dictionary of Music, 985 pages, ISBN 0-19-861459-4
