= Passport (1990 film) =

- Film poster
- Directed by: Georgiy Daneliya
- Written by: Georgiy Daneliya; Revaz Gabriadze; Arkady Khait
- Produced by: Konstantin Alexandrov; Viktor Frejlich; Philip Ratton
- Starring: Gérard Darmon; Natalya Gundareva; Oleg Yankovsky; Armen Dzhigarkhanyan; Yevgeny Leonov; Leonid Yarmolnik
- Cinematography: Vadim Yusov
- Edited by: Tatyana Egorycheva
- Music by: Giya Kancheli
- Production companies: Mosfilm; Passport Production
- Release date: 6 June 1990
- Running time: 103 minutes
- Countries: Soviet Union; France; Austria; Israel
- Languages: Russian; Georgian; Hebrew; Arabic

Passport (Russian: Паспорт) is a 1990 Soviet-French-Austrian-Israeli tragicomedian film directed by Georgiy Daneliya.

== Plot ==
Half-brothers Yasha "Yakov" and Merab Papashvili live in Tbilisi, in 1987. Yasha is a musician, and Merab works as a taxi driver. Yasha (being half-Jewish on his mother's side) decides to repatriate to Israel with his family. Merab has no thoughts of emigration, and is in fact quite happy with his lifestyle as a careless playboy in the USSR. Out of love for his brother, Merab accompanies Yasha and his family to Moscow and Sheremetyevo airport to say goodbye.

At the airport, the brothers want to drink champagne together one last time. The cafe in the public area of the terminal doesn't sell any, and instead directs them to the duty-free shop. Without considering the possible consequences, easy-going Merab borrows his brother's passport and pretends to be him to cross the security checkpoint to the departure area. Merab buys champagne at the duty-free, but then realizes that there's no way to exit the departure area and return to the public terminal. He is given contradictory information by airport employees about where to go and with whom to speak, and he becomes increasingly frantic as he attempts to exit the departure area before Yasha misses his flight. Due to a misunderstanding with a stewardess, he is escorted to his brother's seat on the flight to Austria, which promptly takes off. Onboard the flight, Merab befriends the charming Borya, who is dressed as a stereotypical Russian peasant and sports a balalaika. The plane lands in Vienna (a common practice at the time, due to the lack of direct flights from Moscow to Tel Aviv). As soon as they leave the airport, Borya breaks apart his balalaika to reveal a large stash of US dollars hidden inside (at the time, it was illegal to earn, use, or own US dollars in the USSR). Borya buys himself a stylish outfit and casually offers Merab a job. Merab refuses, and Borya instead gifts him a taxi ride to the Soviet embassy. He then cheerfully departs for the casino.

Merab attempts to enter the embassy, but cannot because the gates are locked. He repeatedly rings the entry bell until an embassy employee opens the door to tell him that the Soviet ambassador to Austria is out until Monday, and that even if the ambassador were present, his case would require a significant amount of time to resolve. Merab continues to press the issue until the Austrian police are called. Merab is apprehended, arrested, and has his mugshot taken (this becomes a running gag). Afterwards, he is released to the Israeli embassy, since he is still using Yasha's identification. There, he again meets Borya, who has already managed to lose all of his money at the casino. The two discuss their options, and decide that the best course of action would be to continue onwards to Israel.

Once in Israel, Merab again pretends to be Yasha to get through immigration. His new plan is to pretend to be Yasha, borrow money from some local relatives, return to the USSR on a tourist visa, and switch places with the real Yasha. He is received by Yasha's Uncle Izya (Isaac) and his wife. After hearing his improbable story, Izya concludes that Merab is a KGB spy and throws him out of the house at gunpoint.

After spending the night in an abandoned boat on the beach, Merab visits a local market and encounters a casual acquaintance from Tbilisi, a former policeman. The acquaintance brings him to a lavish party to seek help from another one of their acquaintances who will be there, the wealthy and influential Tengiz. Tengiz is sympathetic to Merab at first, but Uncle Izya is also in attendance, and publicly denounces Merab as a KGB agent. The guests beat Merab, and throw him out of the party.

While spending a second night on the beach, Merab is contacted by an African agent who saw the incident at the party. Believing Merab to be a KGB spy, he offers to smuggle Merab into USSR so that he can exchange Merab to the Soviet government for an African prince who was arrested in Russia for smuggling. Merab agrees, and the next morning, the African agent attempts to smuggle Merab out of the country in his luggage. However, Merab is discovered and sent back to Uncle Izya's house. There, he learns that the Soviet mission in Tel Aviv, which he thought to have left, is actually operating out of the office of the Finnish ambassador.

Merab attempts to contact the Soviet mission. The official with whom Merab speaks doesn't believe his story and accuses him of being an agent provocateur. Enraged, Merab follows the official to the parking garage and handcuffs himself to what he believes to be the official's car. However, the car actually belongs to the Finnish ambassador. Having no keys to the handcuffs, Merab unhinges the car door and is forced to carry it around for some time until he finds a way to free himself.

Merab is approached by an American journalism student named Jane, who has seen portions of his misadventures over the past two days. He confides his story to her. In return, she introduces him to Senya (Semyon), a World War II veteran who works in an industrial freezing facility and is involved in shady business on the side. Senya proposes a plan to secretly sneak Merab back into the USSR through Jordan, Syria, and Turkey. They depart in a refrigerated truck, drinking and singing Russian songs. Along the way, Senya becomes increasingly paranoid, incapacitating and kidnapping several innocent bystanders whom he considers suspicious. While Merab is driving, the truck is stopped by the police. Senya pretends to be asleep. When the police "wake" him, he claims that he fell asleep in his cab after drinking, and has no idea who Merab is or why he is driving. Merab attempts to flee, but is shot in the leg, arrested, and has his mugshot taken. He is put into prison and beaten by both Muslims and Jews after his attempts to blend in fail.

Shortly, Merab is bailed out of prison by Tengiz. Senya alerted Tengiz after Merab was arrested, and Tengiz realized that Merab is not a spy after checking with mutual acquainances in Tbilisi. Tengiz discusses his plan to help Merab return home as they drive through the desert towards Tel Aviv. On the road, they encounter Senya and his fridge truck. Senya stubbornly insists that they follow the original plan, and incapacitiates both Tengiz and Merab when they protest. Merab resigns himself to Senya's plan, and they travel to the border with Jordan. At the border, Senya shares instructions on how to find his contacts, then escorts Merab through a minefield to the border fence. Suddenly very somber, Senya gives Merab his wedding ring and asks him to put it on his wife's grave, back in the USSR (a flash-forward scene during the opening credits, unexplained until now, reveals that Merab followed through on this request). Merab asks Senya to come with him, but Senya mournfully declines. As Merab begins to leave, he hears an explosion. He turns to see that Senya has been killed by stepping onto a landmine, possibly deliberately. Devastated, Merab remains at the site until a Jordanian military patrol arrives. He is apprehended, arrested as an Israeli spy, and has his mugshot taken.

Three years later, Merab is released from prison. Using the information and contacts that Senya shared with him, Merab travels to the border between Turkey and the USSR. He has no legal way to enter the country: even if Yasha's passport were not both lost and expired, it doesn't allow re-entry into the USSR. Left with no other choice, Merab wades across the waist-deep water separating Turkey from his native Georgia, with arms outstretched, begging unseen border guards not to shoot.

The film ends with Mareb having yet another mugshot taken, presumably by Georgian authorities.

== Cast ==
- Gérard Darmon as Merab Papashvili / Yasha Papashvili
- Natalya Gundareva as Inga, Yasha's wife
- Oleg Yankovsky as Borya Chizh, adventurer
- Armen Dzhigarkhanyan as Senya Klyayn, front scout
- Yevgeny Leonov as Consulate official in Vienna
- Leonid Yarmolnik as Dod, Borya's Israeli friend
- Igor Kvasha as Head Rabbi of Moscow synagogue
- Mamuka Kikaleishvili as Moshe Sepiashvili, former policeman from Tbilisi

== Trivia ==
- Despite the name of the movie, the document that sets the chain of events in motion is not a passport, but a Soviet exit visa.
- The leading role (that of both brothers) was initially offered to Nicolas Cage.
- Georgiy Daneliya makes a brief cameo appearance as an Arab with a donkey.
