= Georgiy Daneliya =

Georgian-Russian film director (1930–2019)

- გიორგი დანელია (Georgian); Георгий Данелия (Russian)
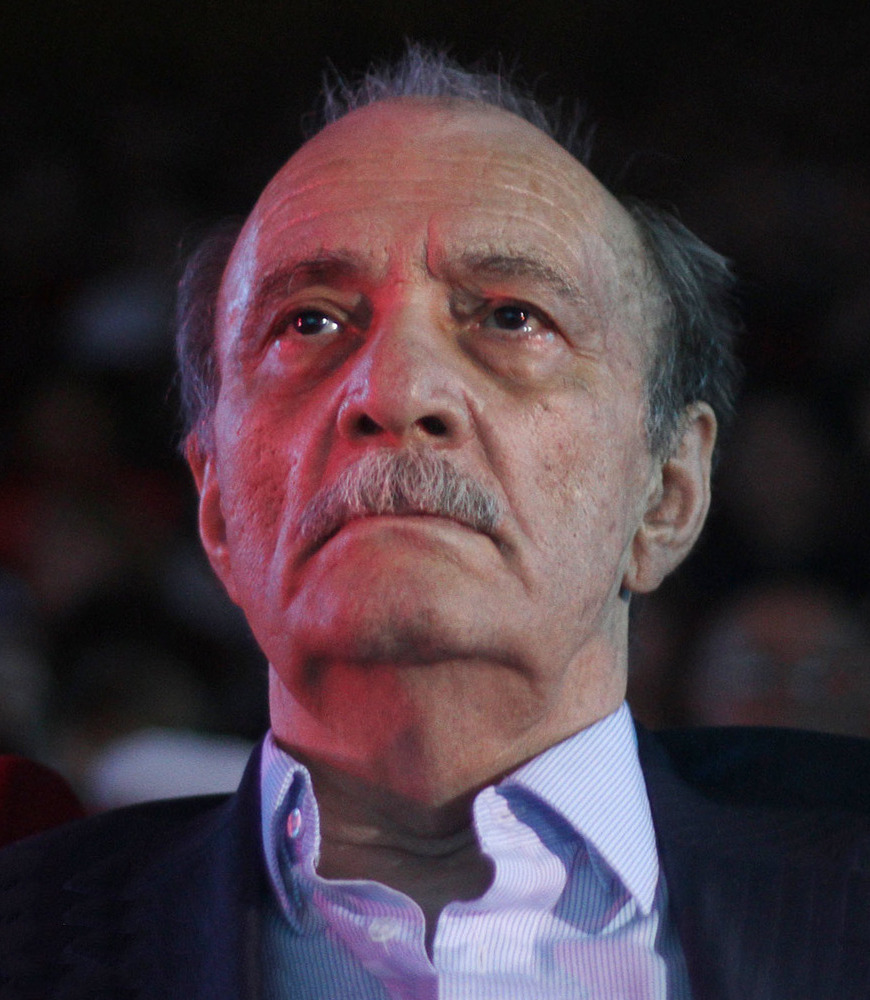
- Daneliya in 2010
- Born: 25 August 1930; Tbilisi, Georgian SSR, Soviet Union
- Died: 4 April 2019 (aged 88); Moscow, Russia
- Occupations: Film director; screenwriter
- Years active: 1942–2019
- Notable work: Walking the Streets of Moscow (1963); Afonya (1975); Mimino (1977); Autumn Marathon (1979); Kin-dza-dza! (1986)
- Title: People's Artist of the USSR (1989)
- Spouse(s): Irina Ginsburg; Lyubov Sokolova; Galina Yurkova
- Awards: State Prize of the Russian Federation

Georgiy Nikolozis dze Daneliya (Note: Georgian: გიორგი ნიკოლოზის ძე დანელია, romanized: Giorgi Nik'olozis dze Danelia; Russian: Георгий Николаевич Данелия, romanized: Georgy Nikolayevich Daneliya; Known by the diminutive Giya, Georgian: გია, romanized: Gia) (25 August 1930 – 4 April 2019) was a Soviet, Russian and Georgian film director and screenwriter. He was named a People's Artist of the USSR in 1989 and a laureate of the State Prize of the Russian Federation in 1997.

== Early life ==
Georgiy Daneliya was born in Tbilisi into a Georgian family. His father Nikolai Dmitrievich Daneliya (1902–1981) came from peasants. He moved to Moscow following the October Revolution, finished the Moscow State University of Railway Engineering and joined Mosmetrostroy where he spent the rest of his life working as an engineer and a manager at different levels. Georgiy's mother Maria Ivlianovna Anjaparidze (1905–1980) belonged to a noble Anjaparidze family known since the 13th century and recognized by the Russian Empire in 1880. She worked as a film director, a second unit director and an assistant director at the Tbilisi Film Studio and Mosfilm. Her sister (Daneliya's aunt) Veriko Anjaparidze was a popular Georgian stage and cinema actress who was married to Mikheil Chiaureli, a prominent Soviet film director. Their daughter Sofiko Chiaureli was also a famous actress who later starred in Daneliya's comedy Don't Grieve along with her mother.

A year after Daneliya's birth his family moved to Moscow where he grew up and entered the primary school. By the time the Great Patriotic War started, he and his mother were staying with their relatives in Tbilisi where they spent the next two years. His father was sent to the front line to build underground command and control centers. He didn't take part in battles, but was still awarded the rank of major general for his work. In 1943 the family reunited back in Moscow.

== Career ==
Daneliya started his career by playing episodic roles in several movies directed by his uncle Mikheil Chiaureli. In 1955 he graduated from the Moscow Architecture Institute and worked as an architect for the next two years. In 1956 the Higher Director's Courses were founded at the Mosfilm Studio, and Daneliya decided to enter them. His course was led by Mikhail Kalatozov, also a good friend of his mother. He graduated in 1959 and joined Mosfilm the same year.

His first feature Seryozha (also known as Splendid Days outside of the Soviet Union) was co-written and co-directed by his friend Igor Talankin. It was based on the popular novel of the same name by a prominent Soviet writer Vera Panova and featured Sergei Bondarchuk and his wife Irina Skobtseva in the leading roles. The movie was well-received, and the same year it was sent to the Karlovy Vary International Film Festival where it was awarded with the Crystal Globe.

In 1963 Daneliya invited a young talent Gennady Shpalikov to collaborate on his first comedy film. By that time Shpalikov had already fallen out of favour for writing Ilyich's Gate, a movie which Nikita Khrushchev compared to an ideological diversion. To avoid censorship, Daneliya paid a visit to Vladimir Baskakov, one of the head officials at the State Committee for Cinematography, and assured him they had nothing tricky on their minds. After that the work became "easy, fast and fun". They ended up with a movie Walking the Streets of Moscow inspired by the French New Wave, similar to Ilyich's Gate in style and mood. This alarmed the Artistic Council, an executive body responsible for pre-production and post-production. They saw no point in the movie. Daneliya and Shaplikov then came up with a "meaningful" episode (a floor polisher who works at the house of a big writer and criticizes beginning writers on this account), mocking the Council along the way, and a new genre of "lyric (or sad) comedy" which became Daneliya's trademark.

The movie starred Nikita Mikhalkov in his first major role and became one of the most characteristic films of the Khrushchev thaw. It was widely praised and officially selected for the 1964 Cannes Film Festival. Nevertheless, Daneliya's next work Thirty Three, a satirical comedy that made fun of the Khrushchev era, wasn't tolerated and was quickly banned from theaters after its initial release in 1965. According to Daneliya, it was still shown at small theaters and various clubs throughout the 1970s, such that by the time the so-called glasnost was proclaimed, it turned out that "everyone had [already] managed to watch my super-banned movie".

Daneliya decided to switch back to his sad comedies instead of straight-up satire. The following years he produced a whole number of highly successful movies that established him as one of the leading Soviet comedy directors. Among his most famous works were Afonya (1975) about an unlucky plumber, Mimino (1977) about a Georgian pilot's adventures in Moscow, Autumn Marathon (1979) about a translator vacillating between his wife and mistress, it won the main prize at the San Sebastian Film Festival. In Gentlemen of Fortune (1971) Daneliya acted as a creative director and a screenwriter.

Gentlemen of Fortune gathered 65 million viewers on the year of release and became the 12th most viewed Soviet film, while Afonya was seen by 62.2 million people, reaching the 15th place. Mimino won the Golden Prize at the 10th Moscow International Film Festival. The Autumn Marathon received the Golden Shell at the 1979 San Sebastián International Film Festival as well as two Pasinetti Awards at the 36th Venice International Film Festival.

In 1976 he was a member of the jury at the 26th Berlin International Film Festival. In 1986 Daneliya directed a cult classic sci-fi film Kin-dza-dza!.

More recently, he was involved in an animation project Ku! Kin-dza-dza! (a straight remake of his earlier work Kin-dza-dza!) and was given the Lifetime Achievement Award by the Russian Academy of Cinema Arts. Between 2003 and 2015 he also published a trilogy of memoirs entitled "A Passenger Without a Ticket", "Toasted Drains To the Dregs" and "The Cat Is Gone, But the Smile Is Left". They are written in a typical Daneliyan manner, mixing laugh-out-loud anecdotes with some sad memories and lyrical life stories.

== Personal life ==
Daneliya was officially married two times. His first wife (1951–1956) was Irina Ginzburg, a lawyer, daughter of a high-ranking Soviet official Semyon Ginzburg, at the time a Deputy Minister of Oil Industry of the USSR. They had a daughter Svetlana Daneliya who also became a lawyer. Between 1957 and 1984 Daneliya lived in a civil union with an acclaimed Russian actress Lyubov Sergeyevna Sokolova who appeared in a number of his movies. They had a son Nikolai Sokolov-Daneliya (1959–1985), a film director and a poet who died at the age of 26 following an "accident". Some claimed it was a drug overdose. Shortly before his death Daneliya left the family for Galina Ivanovna Yurkova (born 1944), a film director and his regular collaborator since then. He adopted her son Kirill (born 1968) and gave him his surname; Kirill became an artist. Daneliya has six grandchildren.

In 1980, Georgiy Daneliya survived a clinical death after being diagnosed with peritonitis and spent a year in hospital. In his final years, he rarely left his apartment. According to his wife Galina Yurkova-Daneliya, he had been suffering from a progressing chronic obstructive pulmonary disease for many years.

== Trademarks ==
Similar to Leonid Gaidai and Eldar Ryazanov, Daneliya co-wrote screenplays to the majority of his movies (sometimes uncredited) and introduced many distinguishing trademarks in the process. After Thirty Three (1965) Yevgeny Leonov turned into his close friend and "a lucky charm". For 30 years Leonov appeared in every movie directed by Daneliya, including several Fitil episodes, either in the leading, supporting or episodic roles. He also played the dual role in Gentlemen of Fortune. Their last collaboration was Nastya (1993) released shortly before Leonov's death.

The traditional Russian song "At the river, at the river, on the other shore Marusenka washed her white legs" performed by Leonov's character in Thirty Three also became their trademark song. According to the director, it was the only song he could recall at the time, and Leonov loved it immensely. It could be heard in all Daneliya's movies that feature Leonov, with the exception of Hopelessly Lost. It's not always easy to spot though, as it is performed by different people, in different languages, sometimes even whistled.

Many of Daneliya's films also featured his Georgian friend Vakhtang Kikabidze. The dual role of Yakov and Merab Papashvili in Passport was also written with Kikabidze in mind, but French producers insisted that it should be given to a French actor (Gérard Darmon played the part).

Starting with Don't Grieve (1968) every one of Daneliya's movies also featured a mysterious man named R. Khobua listed in the "Credits" section among episodic actors. Rene Khobua was in fact a simple Georgian builder whom Daneliya and Gabriadze accidentally met while working on the screenplay for Don't Grieve. They decided to "test" different versions of screenplay on a regular viewer who agreed to listen. After several days of intensive "testing" it turned out that Khobua didn't understand a thing because of his poor Russian, and that he arrived with an urgent task from his employees, but was too shy to mention it. Daneliya then decided to insert Khobua's name in all of his movies that followed.

Daneliya's movies regularly refer to previous ones he had made. For example, an angry man from Walking the Streets of Moscow played by Rolan Bykov whistles a tune from Daneliya's previous film, The Road to Berth, while a fragment of the title song "I'm Walking the Streets of Moscow" could be heard in Thirty Three. The thief nicknamed Kosoi from Gentlemen of Fortune makes a cameo appearance in Nastya where he is also performed by Savely Kramarov in one of his last roles. The catchphrase "It's not wine, it's vinegar" from Don't Grieve was later repeated by the only Georgian character from Kin-dza-dza!, and the troll song from Tears Were Falling could be heard in Daneliya's latest film Ku! Kin-dza-dza. These circular and repetitive motifs are exemplified in the final scene of Kin-dza-dza! where the camera pans up to a spiral constellation of stars, pointing to Daneliya's interest in existential circularity.

== Filmography ==
=== As director ===
- Vasisuali Lohankin (Васисуалий Лоханкин) (1958); short
- Also People (Тоже люди) (1959); short
- Splendid Days (Серёжа) (1960); co-directed with Igor Talankin
- The Road to Berth (Путь к причалу) (1962)
- Walking the Streets of Moscow (Я шагаю по Москве) (1964)
- Thirty Three (Тридцать три) (1965)
- Don't Grieve (Не горюй!) (1968)
- Hopelessly Lost (Совсем пропащий) (1973)
- Afonya (Афоня) (1975)
- Mimino (Мимино) (1977)
- Autumn Marathon (Осенний марафон) (1979)
- Tears Were Falling (Слёзы капали) (1982)
- Kin-dza-dza! (Кин-Дза-Дза!) (1986)
- Passport (Паспорт) (1990)
- Nastya (Настя) (1993)
- Heads and Tails (Орёл и Решка) (1995)
- Fortune (Фортуна) (2000)
- Ku! Kin-dza-dza! (Ку! Кин-дза-дза) (2013)

=== As screenwriter ===
- 1971 – Gentlemen of Fortune (Джентльмены удачи); with Viktoriya Tokareva
- 1988 – Frenchman (Француз); with Sergei Bodrov
- 1988 – Hello from Charlie the Trumpet player (Привет от Чарли Трубача); with Sergei Dernov

=== As actor ===
- 1942 — Giorgi Saakadze (Георгий Саакадзе) as peasant boy
- 1951 — The Unforgettable Year 1919 (Незабываемый 1919 год) as guitar player
- 1955 — Mexican (Мексиканец) as guy with a guitar
- 1963 — Walking the Streets of Moscow (Я шагаю по Москве) as shoeshine man
- 1969 — Don't Grieve (Не горюй!) as station officer
- 1971 — Gentlemen of Fortune (Джентльмены удачи) as passerby
- 1977 — Mimino (Мимино) as commander of the crew of the aircraft «Tbilisi — Moscow»
- 1979 — Autumn Marathon (Осенний марафон) as Otto Skorzeny, officer in a television movie that Buzykins are watching
- 1982 — Tears Were Falling (Слёзы капали) as a passenger on the tram
- 1986 — Kin-dza-dza! (Кин-дза-дза!) as Abradox, ruler of the planet Alpha
- 1990 — Passport (Паспорт) as arab on a donkey
- 1993 — Nastya (Настя) as cultural worker
- 1995 — Heads and Tails (Орёл и решка) as design engineer
- 2000 — Fortune (Фортуна) as kingpin
- 2006 — Carnival Night 2 (Карнавальная ночь-2, или 50 лет спустя) as cameo appearance
- 2013 — Ku! Kin-dza-dza (Ку! Кин-дза-дза) as Camomile / Diogenes (voices)

== Bibliography ==
- Georgiy Daneliya (2003). A Passenger Without a Ticket. — Moscow: Eksmo, 416 pages ISBN 5-699-01834-4
- Georgiy Daneliya (2005). Toasted Drains To the Dregs. — Moscow: Eksmo, 352 pages ISBN 5-699-12715-1
- Georgiy Daneliya (2008). Don't Grieve! — Moscow: AST ISBN 978-5-17-054369-4 (a book of screenplays)
- Georgiy Daneliya (2016). The Cat Is Gone, But the Smile Is Left. — Moscow: Eksmo, 416 pages ISBN 978-5-699-78929-0

== Honours and awards ==
Cannes Film Festival

- Winner in the category Special mention ribbons young filmmakers – 1964 – I Step Through Moscow

Nika Award

- 1987 – The movie Kin-dza-dza
- 1991 – nominated for "Best Screenplay" in the film Passport
- 2008 – For the honour and dignity

Kinotavr

- 1996 – Sochi, the Special Jury Prize, the movie Eagle and Tails
- 1999 – Sochi, Russian President Award "for outstanding contribution to the development of Russian cinema"
- 2000 – Sochi, the winner in the category of "President's Council Award", for the movie Fortune

All-Union Film Festival

- 1964 – Diploma of the Komsomol, for the movie I Walk around Moscow
- 1976 – Frunze, Special Jury Prize for Best Director, Film Afonya
- 1980 – Dushanbe, the main prize, the film Autumn Marathon

Moscow International Film Festival

- 1960 – Carlsbad, Grand Prize "Crystal Globe", the film Sergei
- 1964 – Cannes, Winner of 'Special Mention ribbons of young directors, a film I Step Through Moscow
- 1994 – Milan, the main prize, the film I Step Through Moscow
- 1966 – Rome, the Special Prize of the Festival, the film I Step Through Moscow
- 1970 – Mardel Plata, Special Jury Prize "Condor", the film Do not worry!
- 1970 – Cartagena, Award for Best Actor, the film Do not worry!
- 1975 – Tashkent, the main prize, the film Afonya
- 1977 – Moscow, the main prize, the film Mimino
- 1979 – Avelino, prize "Gold Lacheno" movie Mimino
- 1979 – Venice Prize FIPRESCI, film Autumn Marathon
- 1979 – San Sebastian, the main prize "Big Gold Sink", film Autumn Marathon
- 1980 – Carlsbad, Prize of Soviet-Bulgarian friendship, the film Autumn Marathon
- 1987 – Madrid, Special Jury Prize, the movie Kin-dza-dza
- 1987 – Rio de Janeiro, a special jury prize, the movie Kin-dza-dza
- 1987 – Porto, Special Jury Prize, the movie Kin-dza-dza
- 1990 – Cannes, Spetsilny prize, the film Passport
- 1993 – Rimini, The Prize "Amarcord", the movie Anastasia
- 1996 – Rome Prize "Amarcord", the film Passport
- 1996 – Warne, "Love and passion," the main prize, the movie Eagle and Tails
- 1997 – St. Petersburg, the "Golden Ostap", nominated for "The Legend"

KF "Golden Duke"

- 1990 – Odessa, Grand Prix, the film Passport

ICF comedy films

- 1980 – Chamrousse, the main prize, the film Autumn Marathon
- 1981 – Gabrovo, Special Award, the film Autumn Marathon

International review of films in Acapulco

- 1960 – Prize "Golden Head of Palenque", film Sergei

"Golden laurel wreath" the Foundation David Oliver O. Selznick

- 1961 – film Sergei

"Golden Aries"

- 1995 – "Man Film of the Year"

State Prize of the Russian Federation

- 1996 – movie Anastasia
- 1996 – movie Heads and Tails
- 1996 – film Passport

CCF VC

- 1978 – Yerevan, prize for best comedy film, film Mimino

USSR State Prize

- 1978 – The film Mimino

State Prize of the RSFSR Vasiliev brothers

- 1981 – film Autumn Marathon

Prize "The Wanderer"

- 2002 – St. Petersburg, nominated for "The Legend of fantastic cinema"

Award "Triumph"

- 2002

KF "Viva Cinema of Russia!"

- 2005 – St. Petersburg prize "Unfading viewers love"

Golden Eagle Award

- 2005 – "For loyalty to the profession"

MF debut film "The Spirit of Fire"

- 2006 – The main prize – "Golden Taiga", "For his contribution to cinema"

State Awards

- Honoured Worker of the Arts Industry of the RSFSR (26 November 1965)
- People's Artist of the RSFSR (28 March 1974)
- People's Artist of the USSR (18 August 1989)

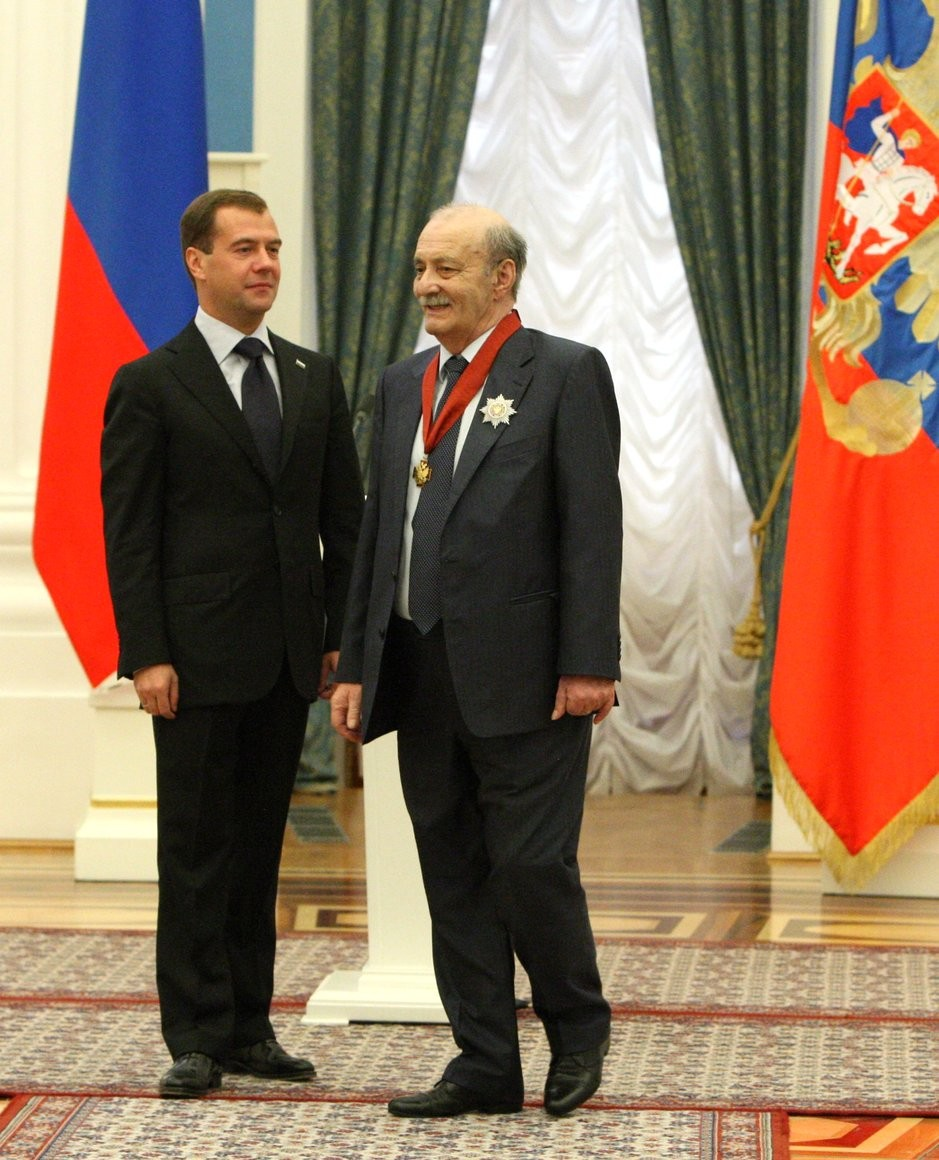
With Dmitry Medvedev on presentation of the Order "For Merit to the Fatherland", 2nd class (9 September 2010)

- Order "For Merit to the Fatherland":
  - 2nd class (25 August 2010) – for outstanding contribution to the development of the domestic art of film and many years of creative activity
  - 3rd class (29 August 2000) – for his great personal contribution to the development of cinema art
- USSR State Prize (19 October 1978) – for the film Mimino (1977)
- Vasilyev Brothers State Prize of the RSFSR (24 December 1981) – for the film Autumn Marathon (1979)
- Honorary Citizen of Tbilisi (1985)
- State Prize of the Russian Federation in the field of cinema in 1996 (29 May 1997) – for the feature films Passport, Anastasia, The Eagle and Tails
- Order of the Badge of Honour
- Order of the Red Banner of Labour (25 August 1980)
- Commander of the Order of Honor (Georgia) (2000)
- Russian President's Award for his contribution to cinema
- Honorary Member of Russian Academy of Arts
- Member of the USSR Union of Cinematographers
