= Savely Kramarov =

Russian–American actor and comedian

- Савелий Крамаров
- Born: 13 October 1934; Moscow, Russian SFSR, Soviet Union
- Died: 6 June 1995 (aged 60); San Francisco, California, U.S.

Savely Viktorovich Kramarov (Russian: Саве́лий Ви́кторович Кра́маров; 13 October 1934 – 6 June 1995) was a Russian–American actor and comedian. He acted in at least 42 Soviet films, and later appeared in several more after his immigration to the United States.

== Early life ==
Savely Kramarov was born on 13 October 1934 to Jewish parents: father Viktor Savelyevich Kramarov (Виктор Савельевич Крамаров), a prominent Moscow attorney, and mother Benedikta Solomonovna "Basya" Kramarova (née Volchek) (Бенедиктa Соломоновнa "Бася" Крамарова (Волчек)). When young Savely was only three years old, the elder Kramarov represented some defendants in a widely publicized Soviet secret police case. Within a year Kramarov's father was himself the victim of a "Stalinist purge"—his crime, representing his clients too vigorously. Arrested and tortured to confess, Kramarov's father was sentenced to a term of eight years in the Soviet Gulag. Savely's mother was forced to divorce his convict father, and mother and son lived for a time in a communal apartment. Before Viktor Kramarov's prison term was up, young Savely's mother died, leaving him effectively an orphan. By a stroke of luck, she had managed to register him as Russian, not Jewish, on his domestic Soviet passport. Savely was once allowed to see his father prior to the elder Kramarov's exile in Biysk. During this meeting, his father, practically a stranger to him, told Savely of his Jewish faith that had sustained him in prison. In the 1950s, the once prominent attorney died in exile. Kramarov spent the remainder of his childhood in poverty, living with relatives, mainly his maternal uncles. During this time, he was diagnosed with tuberculosis; a Jewish physician helped him back to health.

== Education ==
Seeking to follow in his father's footsteps with a career in law, Kramarov quickly found that the door closed for the son of an enemy of the people. Instead Kramarov accepted an offer to a technical school for forestry science. It was around this time Kramarov started acting. Kramarov did not attend formal acting school, at the State Theatre Art Institute, until 1972, well after achieving film stardom. At the same time as his late schooling for acting, he took up yoga, which attracted negative attention from the Soviet authorities.

== Soviet stage and film career ==
Kramarov's first serious acting work was on stage in the late 1950s, in the lead role of Vasily Shukshin’s Vanka, How are You Here. Soon Kramarov was invited to act in Soviet cinema. His first film role was as Soldier Petkin in They Were Nineteen (Im bilo devyatnadtsat) (1960). By his second film My Friend, Kolka!, Kramarov was well on his way to Soviet stardom. His goofy persona (in part a natural result of his being cross-eyed) delighted audiences. And he was a director's dream, dependably turning his lead roles into film-making gold. At the end of his life, Kramarov was asked to identify his favorite films he made; he named My Friend, Kolka!, The Elusive Avengers, The Twelve Chairs, Gentlemen of Fortune, It Can't Be!, and Big School-Break.

But for all his fame and wealth, Kramarov recalled, his life was not whole. His religious identity learned from his family, which he had to hide in the Soviet Union, weighed on him. In 1979, he became a practicing Orthodox Jew; and he actively practiced his faith the rest of his life.

== Emigration application and end of his Soviet career ==
It was at the height of his Soviet fame and fortune when Kramarov, in 1979, startled the Soviet authorities with his application for emigration. By this time he had made 42 films and was one of the Soviet Union's most popular film stars. His application rejected, Kramarov's films were suppressed nationwide; his film career was dead. He found his only outlet to continue acting was a theatre of refuseniks, where the passports of prospective audience members were checked on arrival at a performance.

Not giving up hope, Kramarov next took up a campaign in Western news media to secure his coveted exit visa, going so far as to write to then-U.S. President Ronald Reagan, as from "one actor to another." The Reagan letter was read multiple times on Voice of America radio.

Upon finally being allowed to leave on 31 October 1981, Kramarov became persona non grata in the Soviet Union, like all celebrities considered traitors or enemies of the state. His name was removed from credits of all the films that he made so successful. Recalling a newly Kramarov-less Soviet Union, Oleg Vidov, another Russian actor who emigrated after Kramarov, noted: "The government took all of his posters down from the walls. They didn't want to have to explain why he left; it was easier just to forget."

== American film career and later life ==
Kramarov achieved only moderate success in American cinema, playing small Russian roles. Americans know him best, probably, for his role as a Soviet KGB handler in Paul Mazursky's Moscow on the Hudson, starring Robin Williams. Kramarov returned to his motherland only once, in 1992, following the break-up of the Soviet Union, as the guest of honor at a Russian film festival. After moving to Los Angeles in 1992, Kramarov missed the forests surrounding his native Moscow. He bought a home in a wooded area in Forest Knolls, Marin County, north of San Francisco. In early 1995, Kramarov's American career took off and he landed a lead role in a new film.

== Death ==
In March 1995, Kramarov underwent what is normally routine surgery to remove a bowel tumor. As unexpected complications, he suffered debilitating strokes and eventually endocarditis. Kramarov died at Pacific Medical Center Hospital in San Francisco on 6 June 1995, age 60. He was survived by his wife Natalia Siradze, as well as his daughter from a previous marriage, Basya (Бася) Kramarov.

Thanks to the personal contributions of fellow former Soviet exiles of Kramarov's, including artist Mihail Chemiakin, a unique gravestone containing "casts of [Kramarov's] comedy masks, scripts, [and] make-up brushes," and his framed photograph was placed at the Jewish cemetery, Hills of Eternity Memorial Park in Colma, California, in 1997. Of Kramarov, his rabbi, Joseph Langer, said, "He was a sincerely believing person, humble and kind" and "[He] was a holy goofball."

== Legacy ==
"Mr. Kramarov was perhaps the most beloved figure in the Soviet Union," noted his former fellow Soviet actor Oleg Vidov. Kramarov's consistently-played version of a stock "Crazy Ivan" character "provided a veneer of protection in a totalitarian society". "When you're clever, the system kills you," Vidov said. "When you're crazy, you can get away with things." "[Kramarov] touched off a chain reaction of smiles every time he walked down a Moscow street... He was our guy.", concluded Vidov.

== Partial filmography ==
=== Soviet ===
- Im bylo devyatnadtsat (1960)
- Proshchayte, golubi (1961)
- My Friend, Kolka! (1961) – Pimen
- Priklyucheniya Krosha (1962) – Ivashkin
- Na semi vetrakh (1962)
- Khod konyom (1962)
- Bey, baraban! (1963)
- Bez strakha i upryoka (1963)
- Pervyy trolleybus (1964) – Parasite #1 (uncredited)
- A Tale of Lost Times (1964) – old Vasya
- Thirty Three (1965) – Rodion Khomutov
- Na zavtrashney ulitse (1965) – Matveychuk
- Artakarg handznararutyun (1966)
- Gorod masterov (1966) – Klik-Klyak
- Krasnoye, sineye, zelyonoye (1966) – Registrar
- Formula radugi (1966)
- Chyort s portfelem (1966) – Petya Likhov
- The Red and the White (1967) - White Cossack Savva
- The Elusive Avengers (1967) – Ilyukha Verekhov
- The New Adventures of the Elusive Avengers (1968) – lyukha Verekhov
- Zolotye chasy (1968)
- Trembita (1968) – Pyotr
- Groza nad beloy (1968)
- The Secret of the Iron Door (1970) – Pigeon
- The Twelve Chairs (1971) – Chess-club chairman
- Derzhis za oblaka (1971)
- Gentlemen of Fortune (1971) – Fedya Yermakov / Cross Eyes
- Zolotye roga (1973)
- Big School-Break (1972, TV Series) - Timokhin
- This Merry Planet (1973) – Prokhor
- Ivan Vasilievich: Back to the Future (1973) – Feofan
- Zvezda ekrana (1974) – Grisha, chlen kinogruppy
- Cirkus v cirkuse (1975) – Zrízenec Lopuchov
- Afonya (1975) – Yegoza
- It Can't Be! (1975) – Sergei, Vladimir's friend
- Bolshoy attraktsion (1975) – Senya
- Au-u! (1976) – Duke
- Ma-ma (Rock 'n' Roll Wolf) (1976) – Little Wolf
- Mimino (1977) – Prisoner
- The New Adventures of Captain Wrongel (1978) – Furious Garry
- Zhivite v radosti (1978)
- Po ulitsam komod vodili... (1978) – Professor
- Russkiy biznes (1993) – uncle Vasya
- Nastya (1994)

=== American ===
- Moscow on the Hudson (1984) – Boris
- 2010: The Year We Make Contact (1984) – Dr. Vladimir Rudenko
- Armed and Dangerous (1986) – Olaf
- Morgan Stewart's Coming Home (1987) – Ivan
- Red Heat (1988) – Gregor Moussorsky
- Tango & Cash (1989) – Car owner
- Love Affair (1994) – Cable Officer (final film role)
