= Mimino =

- Film poster
- Directed by: Georgiy Daneliya
- Written by: Georgiy Daneliya; Revaz Gabriadze; Viktoriya Tokareva
- Starring: Vakhtang Kikabidze; Frunzik Mkrtchyan
- Cinematography: Anatoliy Petritskiy
- Edited by: Tatyana Egorycheva
- Music by: Giya Kancheli
- Production company: Mosfilm
- Release date: 6 June 1977
- Running time: 97 minutes
- Country: Soviet Union
- Languages: Russian; Georgian; Armenian

Mimino (Russian: Мимино, Georgian: მიმინო, Armenian: Միմինո) is a 1977 comedy-drama film by Soviet director Georgiy Daneliya produced by Mosfilm and the Georgian Film Studio, starring Vakhtang Kikabidze and Frunzik Mkrtchyan. Anatoliy Petritskiy served as the film's Director of Photography. The Soviet era comedy won the 1977 Golden Prize at the 10th Moscow International Film Festival.

== Plot ==
Valentin Mizandari, nicknamed Mimino (Georgian: მიმინო; lit. 'sparrowhawk'), is a Georgian bush pilot based in his hometown of Telavi. When he reunites with his former flight academy classmate Valera, who is a Tu-144 pilot in Tbilisi, Mimino meets Valera's stewardess colleague Larisa and becomes infatuated with her. Comparing his modest work to Valera's glamorous career, he begins to feel disillusioned with his life. He asks his boss for a transfer to larger aircraft, hoping eventually to become an airline pilot.

Mimino goes to Moscow, leaving his family and his old life behind. Before his departure, his grandfather gives him a cryptic warning: if he ever encounters a particular man, he must not kill him. In Moscow, he is set up in an exclusive hotel. He shares a room with boisterous Armenian truck driver Ruben "Rubik" Hachikyan, who has been given the room after being mistaken for an endocrinologist with the same surname. The two quickly become friends.

Mimino invites Larisa to dinner, but she fails to appear. After Rubik encourages him to try again, he asks her to the theater. Before they can meet, the pair are evicted from the hotel when Rubik’s mistaken identity is uncovered. When Mimino telephones Larisa from a payphone, her younger sister answers and cruelly pretends to reject him, leaving him convinced that Larisa no longer wishes to see him. Meanwhile, Mimino submits his application to become an airline pilot.

Before parting ways, the two attempt to sell one of Rubik’s spare tires, leading to them knocking on the door of Nugzar Papashvili. Mimino instantly recognizes him and reacts with anger, forcing his way into the apartment. Accused of assaulting Nugzar and breaking his chandelier, Mimino is arrested. Refusing to explain his actions to the court, Mimino is sentenced to two years in prison. His lawyer later uncovers that years earlier, Nugzar had abandoned Mimino’s sister after fathering her child. In light of this information, the court reduces the sentence to a fine.

Mimino and Rubik part ways, promising to meet again someday. Mimino then learns that he is ineligible to begin training as an airline pilot, as he has just exceeded the maximum age of 35. With his prospects in Moscow seemingly exhausted, Mimino heads to Vnukovo Airport and tries to sell his watch. There he meets Ivan “Vano” Volokhov, who mistakenly believes Mimino is the son of an old wartime friend and arranges an interview for him with the airline chairman. Although the misunderstanding is soon revealed, the chairman is impressed by Mimino’s honesty and offers him the job.

Mimino becomes an international airline pilot and eventually flies a Tu-144 to West Berlin. However, he quickly discovers that his new career does not bring him the satisfaction he expected. He attempts to telephone Rubik from West Berlin, but the operator is unable to connect him to Dilijan. When Mimino instead gives the operator the name "Telavi", she mishears and connects him to Tel Aviv. By pure chance he is connected to Isak, a Georgian emigrant living there. They sing a children’s song together as Isak is moved to tears at hearing his native language. This encounter makes Mimino increasingly homesick.

Mimino later encounters Larisa again and learns that her younger sister—not Larisa herself—had answered the telephone in Moscow. Although Larisa invites him to contact her if he returns to Moscow, Mimino remains dissatisfied with his new life.

The film abruptly cuts to Mimino back home in Telavi, where he is once again flying Mi-2 helicopters. Having experienced the life he had believed would make him happier, he returns to his hometown and his former occupation, now genuinely content with the life he had previously taken for granted.

== Cast ==
- Vakhtang Kikabidze as Mimino
- Frunzik Mkrtchyan as Rubik
- Elena Proklova as Larisa Ivanovna
- Archil Gomiashvili as Papashvili
- Kote Daushvili as Mimino’s grandfather
- Zakro Sakhvadze as Varlaam
- Marina Dyuzheva as Svetlana Georgiyevna
- Ruslan Miqaberidze as Givi Ivanovich
- Leonid Kuravlyov as Professor Khachikyan
- Rusiko Morchiladze as Lali
- Aleksandr Alekseyev as Prosecutor
- Vladimir Basov as Sinitsyn
- Valentina Titova as Sinitsyn's Wife
- Lyudmila Gavrilova as symposium organizer
- Nikolay Grabbe as airline chairman, Volokhov's war friend

== Release ==
Mimino was selected for the 10th Moscow International Film Festival in 1977, but was subject to censorship. Notably, director Georgiy Daneliya managed to save the "Telavi/Tel Aviv" phone call scene despite the state's limitations of emigration to Israel by Soviet Jews. Reportedly, Daneliya was disgusted by the cuts and buried a copy of the "sanitized" version in his yard.

== DVD Extras ==
As a part of the DVD extras accompanying the film, the cinematographer, Anatoliy Petritskiy, is interviewed about the film. He reminisces about his experiences working with Daneliya and the actors. Having known Daneliya for some time and having seen several of his films, he was very happy to receive the offer to work with him. Initially the two were working on a different film in 1977, and discussed the doubts they had about the script, after which they decided to work on Mimino as an alternative. Petritskiy was surprised that Goskino had already approved the film and that funding had been secured, and the project moved forward. Petritskiy discusses the locations of the various shots in the film, which includes several villages in Georgia, the Tbilisi airport, Moscow, and West Germany. According to Petritskiy, casting the film was not a problem, as Daneliya was familiar with all of the actors in the film. More strange to the cinematographer, was Daneliya's wish to shoot scenes in the mountainous region of Tusheti, as it was a very remote area that could only be reached by helicopter. Petritskiy described the conditions as "medieval". He noted that the lack of electricity had "put its stamp on the character of the population of Omalo", which basically lived without light. The conflict between a simple way of life and that of the big city is to him the central conflict of the film. It is because of this that he filmed the movie in a "restrained style". He points out that even the portions of the film shot in Moscow are static shots or simple panoramas. He considers the landscapes of Georgia in the film to be "extremely beautiful". Petritskiy then discusses the various shots at airports, which were done as a montage — the helicopter in Tbilisi, and the magnificent shot of the Tu-144 plane in Moscow. Initially the latter part of the film was to be shot in America, but because of "purely budgetary reasons", the cast and crew could not film there, opting to shoot in West Berlin; thus, the script was revised. Petritskiy notes that it was arranged that the group would stay in East Berlin (again for economic reasons) and had to cross the border every day to the American zone to film at the Tegel Airport. As for the scenes with the cow hanging from the helicopter, it was shot in two stages: a papier-mache dummy of a cow was used with the helicopter for the far off shots, and a live cow was lifted by a crane was used for the close-ups. He notes that the cow was only hung at a low height, but high enough to use the blue sky as a backdrop, and the cow was not hurt. Petritskiy did not consider the scene to be difficult, pointing out that the winter scenes were much harder. He details the harsh living conditions in the village of Darklo where they stayed. He describes how few locals stay during the winter, and how the living quarters were not guarded or locked, but housed a few shepherds who had stayed back for the winter. He explains how there were "sleep-benches" within the houses, and how they lived on canned preserves during their stay, sharing their "feast" with the hungry shepherds there. In conclusion, Petritskiy notes that he "got a very pleasant impression" from working on the film.

== Awards ==
- 1977 – Golden Prize at the 10th Moscow International Film Festival
- 1978 – "Golden Lacheno" Award at the 19th IFF in Avellino (Italy)
- 1978 – Best Comedy Film Award at the 11th All-Union Film Festival in Yerevan
- 1978 – USSR State Prize (Director G. Daneliya, Actors V. Kikabidze, F. Mkrtchyan)
