= List of Soviet films of 1976 =

== 1976 ==
Title	Russian title	Director	Cast	Genre	Notes
1976
...And Other Officials	...И другие официальные лица	Semyon Aranovich	Lev Durov	Drama	
The Adventures of Buratino	Приключения Буратино	Leonid Nechayev	Dmitri Iosifov, Nikolai Grinko, Yuri Katin-Yartsev, Tatyana Protsenko	Musical	
Adventures of Captain Wrongel	Приключения капитана Врунгеля	David Cherkassky	Zinovy Gerdt, Yevhen Paperny, Heorhiy Kyshko, Grigory Shpigel	Animation	
The Age of Innocence	Несовершеннолетние	Vladimir Rogovoy	Vladimir Letenkov, Stanislav Zhdanko, Leonid Kayurov, Pavel Nikolai	Youth drama	Also called Minors
The Beginning of the Legend	Так начиналась легенда	Boris Grigoryev	Larisa Luzhina	Drama	
The Blue Bird	Синяя птица	George Cukor	Elizabeth Taylor, Jane Fonda, Ava Gardner, Cicely Tyson, Robert Morley	Fantasy	Joint USSR-USA film
Blue Puppy	Голубой щенок	Yefim Gamburg	Mikhail Boyarsky, Alisa Freindlich, Alexander Gradsky, Andrei Mironov	Animation	
The Days of the Turbins	Дни Турбиных	Vladimir Basov	Andrey Myagkov, Andrei Rostotsky, Valentina Titova, Oleg Basilashvili	Drama	
Duck Village. A Tale.	Деревня Утка	Boris Buneev	Rolan Bykov	Family	
The Elder Son	Старший сын	Vitaly Melnikov	Yevgeny Leonov, Natalia Egorova, Vladimir Izotov, Nikolai Karachentsov, Mikhail Boyarsky	Drama	
Golden River	Золотая речка	Venyamin Dorman	Boris Smorchkov	Adventure	
Heavenly Swallows	Небесные ласточки	Leonid Kvinikhidze	Ia Ninidze, Andrei Mironov, Irina Gubanova, Lyudmila Gurchenko	Musical, comedy	
Finist, the brave Falcon	Финист - Ясный сокол	Gennadi Vasilyev	Vyacheslav Voskresensky	Musical, adventure, fantasy	
How Czar Peter the Great Married Off His Moor	Сказ про то, как царь Пётр арапа женил	Alexander Mitta	Vladimir Vysotskiy, Alexei Petrenko, Ivan Ryzhov, Irina Mazurkevich	Drama, comedy	
Hundred for courage	100 грамм для храбрости	Boris Bushmelev, Anatoli Markelov, Georgi Shchukin	Igor Yasulovich, Yuriy Kuzmenkov, Yuri Belov	Comedy	
The Key That Should Not Be Handed On	Ключ без права передачи	Dinara Asanova	Elena Proklova	Drama	
The Little Mermaid	Русалочка	Vladimir Bychkov	Viktoriya Novikova	Fantasy	
Practical Joke	Розыгрыш	Vladimir Menshov	Dmitry Kharatyan	Drama	
Queen of the Gypsies	Табор уходит в небо	Emil Loteanu	Svetlana Toma, Grigore Grigoriu, Barasbi Mulayev, Mikhail Shishkov, Borislav Brondukov, Vasyl Symchych	Romance, musical, drama	
A Slave of Love	Раба любви	Nikita Mikhalkov	Elena Solovey, Rodion Nahapetov, Aleksandr Kalyagin	Drama	
Speech for the Defence	Слово для защиты	Vadim Abdrashitov	Galina Yatskina	Drama	
Story of an Unknown Actor	Повесть о неизвестном актёре	Aleksandr Zarkhi	Yevgeny Yevstigneyev	Drama	
Truffaldino from Bergamo	Труффальдино из Бергамо	Vladimir Vorobyov	Konstantin Raikin, Natalya Gundareva, Valentina Kosobutskaya	Musical	
Trust	Доверие	Edvin Laine, Viktor Tregubovich	Kirill Lavrov	History, biopic, drama	Finnish-Soviet co-production
The Twelve Chairs	12 стульев	Mark Zakharov	Andrei Mironov, Georgy Vitsin, Anatoli Papanov, Aleksandr Abdulov, Tatyana Pelttser, Lidiya Fedoseyeva-Shukshina	Musical, comedy	TV Miniseries
Twenty Days Without War	Двадцать дней без войны	Aleksey German	Yuri Nikulin, Lyudmila Gurchenko	Drama	
The White Ship	Белый пароход	Bolotbek Shamshiyev	Nurgazy Sydygaliyev	Drama	Entered into the 26th Berlin International Film Festival
When September comes	Когда наступает сентябрь	Edmond Keosayan	Armen Dzhigarkhanyan	Drama	
Widows	Вдовы	Sergey Mikaelyan	Galina Makarova	Drama	
You to Me, Me to You	Ты — мне, я — тебе	Aleksandr Sery	Leonid Kuravlyov	Comedy	
