= Shevchenko (disambiguation) =

Shevchenko is primarily referred to the Ukrainian surname Shevchenko.

Also often in honor of the Ukrainian poet Taras Shevchenko it may refer to the following.

Places

- Shevchenko, name of Aktau, a city in Kazakhstan, in 1964–1992
- Fort-Shevchenko, a town in Kazakhstan
- Shevchenko Raion (disambiguation), name of several different districts in Ukraine
- Shevchenko, Russia, name of several rural localities in Russia
- Shevchenko, Donetsk Oblast, a settlement in Ukraine
- a neighborhood in Dnipro, Ukraine
- Szewczenko, until 1910 the name of Vita, a village in Manitoba, Canada
- Şevcenco, a village in Mocra Commune, Transnistria, Moldova

Organizations

- Kyiv Shevchenko University, the largest university in Ukraine
- Luhansk Shevchenko National Pedagogical University
- Shevchenko Scientific Society, a non-governmental Ukrainian Academy of Sciences, based in Lviv
