= Fedir Stryhun =

Ukrainian actor (1939–2026)

- Федір Стригун
- Stryhun performing on stage in 2001
- Born: 1 November 1939; Tomashivka, Kyiv Oblast, Ukrainian SSR, Soviet Union
- Died: 23 October 2026 (aged 86); Lviv, Ukraine
- Title: People's Artist of the Ukrainian SSR (1979)
- Awards: Shevchenko National Prize (1978); Order of Prince Yaroslav the Wise; Order of Merit

Fedir Mykolayovych Stryhun (Ukrainian: Федір Миколайович Стригун; 1 November 1939 – 23 October 2026) was a Ukrainian film and theatre actor and director. He spent more than 50 years working at the Maria Zankovetska Theatre in Lviv, was a laureate of Shevchenko National Prize (1978) and received the title of People's Artist of the Ukrainian SSR.

== Life and career ==
Fedir Stryhun was born on 1 November 1939 in the village of Tomashivka (now in Palanka rural hromada, Uman Raion, Cherkasy Oblast). In 1961 he graduated from the Ivan Karpenko-Karyi Theatre Instutute in Kyiv. During the following years Stryhun worked at the Zaporizhzhia Musical and Drama Theatre. In 1965 he moved to Lviv and joined the troupe of Maria Zankovetska Theatre. Between 1987 and 2019 he served as artistic manager and chief director of the theatre.

Throughout his career, Stryhun played over 100 theatrical roles in works by both Ukrainian and foreign dramatists. Among notable figures played by him on the stage were Othello, Richard III, Don Juan, Bohdan Khmelnytsky and Andrey Sheptytsky. As a director, he staged plays by Ivan Karpenko-Karyi, Taras Shevchenko, Lesya Ukrainka, Mykola Kulish and many other authors. An important legacy of his was the revival of popularity of Hutsulka Ksenia and several other works by Yaroslav Barnych.

Along with his work in theatre, Stryhun achieved prominence as a cinema actor. His most famous role was Zaporozhian Cossack Andriy in Borys Ivchenko's film The Lost Letter, based on a short story by Mykola Hohol. He also starred in several other Ukrainian films, including the 2014 historical drama The Guide by Oles Sanin.

In addition, Stryhun worked as a lecturer at the Lviv Conservatory and Ivan Franko Lviv National University.

Stryhun died on 23 October 2026, at the age of 86, following a long illness. His contribution to Ukrainian theatre and cultural life of Lviv and the wider region was praised by mayor Andriy Sadovyi and head of Lviv Oblast administration Maksym Kozytskyi.

== Selected filmography ==
- Annychka (1968) as Fyodor
- The Lost Letter (1972) as Andriy
- Babylon XX (1979) as Savka Chibis
- Such Late, Such Warm Autumn (1981) as Yeremiy
- And Memory Will Respond in the Sounds (1986) as Mykola Lysenko
- The Guide (2013) as master Bohdan

== Awards and honours ==
In 1978 Stryhun was awarded the Shevchenko Prize, and next year received the title of People's Artist of the Ukrainian SSR. He was a fellow of the National Academy of Arts of Ukraine and was awarded the Order of Prince Yaroslav the Wise and Order of Merit.
