= Mykolaichuk =

Mykolaichuk (Ukrainian: Миколайчук) is a Ukrainian patromymic surname. It may also be rendered as Mikolaichuk or Mikolaychuk. Ukrainian surname:

- Ivan Mykolaichuk
- Maria Mykolaichuk

== See also ==
- 8244 Mikolaichuk, minor planet
- 8244 Mikolachuk, minor planet
