= The Shooting Party (Chekhov novel) =

1884 novel by Anton Chekhov

- Cover art of 1926 English-language publication
- Author: Anton Chekhov
- Language: Russian
- Genre: Novel
- Publisher: Stanley Paul (1926): Penguin Books (2004)
- Publication date: 1884
- Pages: 244 (1926 Stanley Paul): 199 (2004 Penguin)

The Shooting Party (Russian: Драма на охоте, romanized: Drama na okhote; lit. English: Drama During a Hunt) is an 1884 novel by Anton Chekhov. It is his longest narrative work, and only full-length novel. Framed as a manuscript given to a publisher, it tells the story of an estate forester's daughter in a provincial Russian village, who is stabbed to death in the woods during a hunting party, and the efforts to uncover her killer.

== Plot ==
As the narrator informs, "The Shooting Party" is the name of a manuscript that an unknown author begs a Moscow publisher to read and publish. The narrator agrees at least to read it, and the author says that he will return in three months for the verdict.

Within this manuscript—which makes up the bulk of the book—the narrator is the local magistrate in a rural area. His friend and drinking partner, Count Alexei, lives on a nearby estate with his hard-working bailiff, Urbenin, and Nikolai Efimych, a retailer who has gone insane. Nikolai's daughter Olga also lives on the estate, and is in the midst of a love triangle with the magistrate and Urbenin.

After marrying Urbenin, Olga has an illicit affair with Count Alexei, yet still proclaims her love of the magistrate. During a hunting party in the woods near the estate, Olga wanders off by herself and disappears; she is later found stabbed to death. The initial suspicion falls on Urbenin, who appears with blood on his hands after finding her body. A one-eyed peasant comes forward who may be able to implicate a different killer, but he is murdered in jail before making the profession.

The manuscript concludes with Urbenin's conviction of Olga's murder, and he is sent to Siberia for a sentence of nineteen years at hard labor. A postscript written by the publisher identifies the real killer as the unknown author of the manuscript.

== Publication history ==
The Shooting Party was originally published in Russia in serial form in a total of thirty-two segments. It was later published in its entirety in an English translation (completed by A.E. Chamot) by London publisher Stanley Paul in 1926.

In 2004, the novel was republished by Penguin Books with a new translation by Ronald Wilks.

== Reception ==
An assessment published by New York University's Literature Arts & Medicine Database notes: "The Shooting Party is neither a great novel nor a great mystery story. However, its merits go far beyond the usual attribution of juvenilia by a great writer. First, the story itself is ingenious. In its innovative structure, the book prefigures Agatha Christie's most famous novel, The Murder of Roger Ackroyd written 45 years later. Christie's novel caused a sensation with its narrator-as-murderer plot device."

British crime writer Julian Symons proclaimed the novel a "landmark in the history of the crime story."

== Adaptations ==
- A 1944 film, Summer Storm, was directed by Douglas Sirk.
- A 1970 TV play by Boris Nirenburg
- A 1978 film, A Hunting Accident, was directed by Emil Loteanu.
