= Anna Pavlova (disambiguation) =

Anna Pavlova (1881–1931) was a Russian ballerina.

Anna Pavlova may also refer to:

- Anna Pavlova (film), a 1983 biographical film on the ballerina
- Anna Pavlova (gymnast) (born 1987), Russian artistic gymnast
