= Galina Belyayeva =

Soviet and Russian actress

- Галина Беляева
- Born: Galina Viktorovna Belyayeva; 26 April 1961 (age 65); Irkutsk, Russian SFSR, Soviet Union
- Occupation: Actress
- Years active: 1977–present
- Spouses: Emil Loteanu (m. 1979; div. 1984) Sergey Doychenko (m. 1989)
- Partner: Levon Sakvarelidze (mid-1980s)
- Children: 4
- Awards: Meritorious Artist of Russia (2003)

Galina Viktorovna Belyaeva (Russian: Галина Викторовна Беляева; born 26 April 1961) is a Soviet and Russian film and theatre actress, best known for her leading roles in A Hunting Accident (1977) and Anna Pavlova (1983). Belyaeva, the Meritorious Artist of Russia (2003), has been one of the leading actresses at the Moscow Mayakovsky Theatre since 1983.

== Biography ==
Belyaeva was born in Irkutsk and spent her childhood years in Nevinnomyssk, Northern Caucasus, raised with her younger sister by a single mother, who worked at a local construction site. At age thirteen, she went to Voronezh to study classical ballet at the Choreography College. It was there that she was spotted by the assistant of film director Emil Loteanu, who was at the time looking for a teenage actress for the role of Olya Skvortsova in A Hunting Accident.

External videos
- Belyaeva and Yankovsky in A Hunting Accident (fragments). Music by Eugen Doga. 3:30, YouTube

Belyayeva's performance next to Oleg Yankovsky earned her critical acclaim and an epithet 'Russian Audrey Hepburn'. Yankovsky stated later that it was her presence that imparted the film its unique, haunting atmosphere. During the shooting, Belyaeva became romantically involved with Loteanu, who two years later married the 18-year-old actress.

In 1979, Belyayeva enrolled into the Shchukin Theatre Institute in Moscow. After her graduation in 1983, she joined Mayakovsky Theatre and made her debut there as Vika in Tomorrow There Was War, after Boris Vasilyev's novel. While a Shchukin Institute student, Belyaeva appeared in several films. After her performance as Vera Lisichkina in Ah, Vaudeville, Vaudeville (1979), she was lauded as one of the brightest hopes of the Soviet film industry.

In 1983, Loteanu filmed his wife in the biopic Anna Pavlova, where Belyayeva, playing the great ballerina, had also to perform most of her stage numbers. "We've done a lot of home work. Contacted the Anna Pavlova Society in London (where she lived in emigration) and received from them invaluable help. For days on end I was studying footages of her stage performances, practiced in Stanislavsky and Nemirovich-Danchenko Theatre with finest ballet instructors," the actress remembered later. Despite some criticism, from the Bolshoi Theatre headquarters mostly, the film was met with popular acclaim and confirmed Belyaeva's status as a Soviet film star. Also highly successful were her performances in the lyrical comedy Her Romantic Hero (1984), film-operetta Pericola (1984) and The Black Arrow (1985), after Robert Louis Stevenson's novel.

In the post-Perestroika years, Belyayeva continued to work in the theatre but mostly ignored the approaches from the film directors. Her most notable role in film in the recent times was that of Valeria, the dance teacher, in Vitaly Tarasenko's They Danced Just One Winter (2004).

== Private life ==
In 1979, Belyayeva married film director Emil Loteanu. Their marriage was a stormy one and lasted five years. Later Belyayeva spoke with great admiration and respect of her first husband, giving him credit for being her first serious tutor who in many ways shaped her as an actress. Their son, Emil Emilyevich Loteanu, was born in 1980. A Moscow University graduate, he studied music in the USA and, as of 2013, lived in Los Angeles. He has a daughter, Masha, and a son, Christian.

Belyayeva's second son's father is the surgeon Levon Sakvarelidze, her partner in the mid-1980s. Platon (born 1985), a Moscow University's Law faculty graduate, appeared in two films his early years, Bembi's Childhood, Детство Бемби, 1985) and Lermontov (1986, as an infant poet). He studied at the Moscow University Law faculty and then Gerasimov Institute of Cinematography, to become an independent film producer.

In 1989, Belyayeva married the businessman and publisher Sergey Doychenko (b. 1966). They have two children, Anna (b. 1993) and Markel (b. 1999).

== Selected filmography ==
Film
Year	Title	Role	Notes
1978	A Moment Decides Everything	Nadia Privalova	
1978	A Hunting Accident	Olga	
1980	A Piece of Sky	Anzhel	
1981	Lenin in Paris	girl student	
1983	Anna Pavlova	Anna Pavlova	
1984	Park	Vika	
