= Svetlana Toma =

Moldovan actress

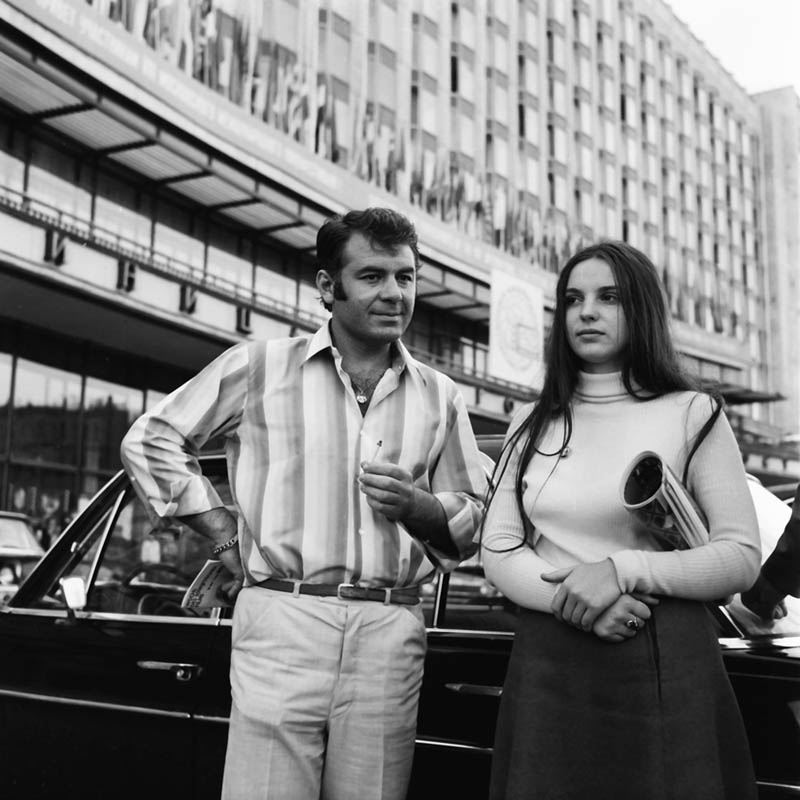
- Toma in 1972
- Born: Svetlana Fomichyova; May 24, 1947 (age 79); Chișinău, Moldovan SSR, Soviet Union
- Occupation: Actress
- Years active: 1960–present
- Partner: Oleg Lachin
- Children: Irina Lachina

Svetlana Andreevna Toma (Russian: Светлана Андреевна Тома, born Svetlana Andreevna Fomichyova (Russian: Светлана Андреевна Фомичёва; born 24 May 1947) is a Moldovan-Russian and Soviet actress. She debuted at the Moldova-Film studio in 1966. She worked in the Soviet Union. She is the mother of the actress Irina Lachina.

Toma gained global fame after starring in the film Queen of the Gypsies directed by Emil Loteanu, which brought her huge international success as an actress. The picture was bought by 112 countries. This record has not been beaten by any Soviet or Russian film.

Her artistic alias 'Toma' is usually pronounced with the emphasis on the first syllable. However, the actress herself points out that originally (with emphasis on the second syllable) it was the surname of her maternal great-grandmother, who was of French origin.

== Biography ==
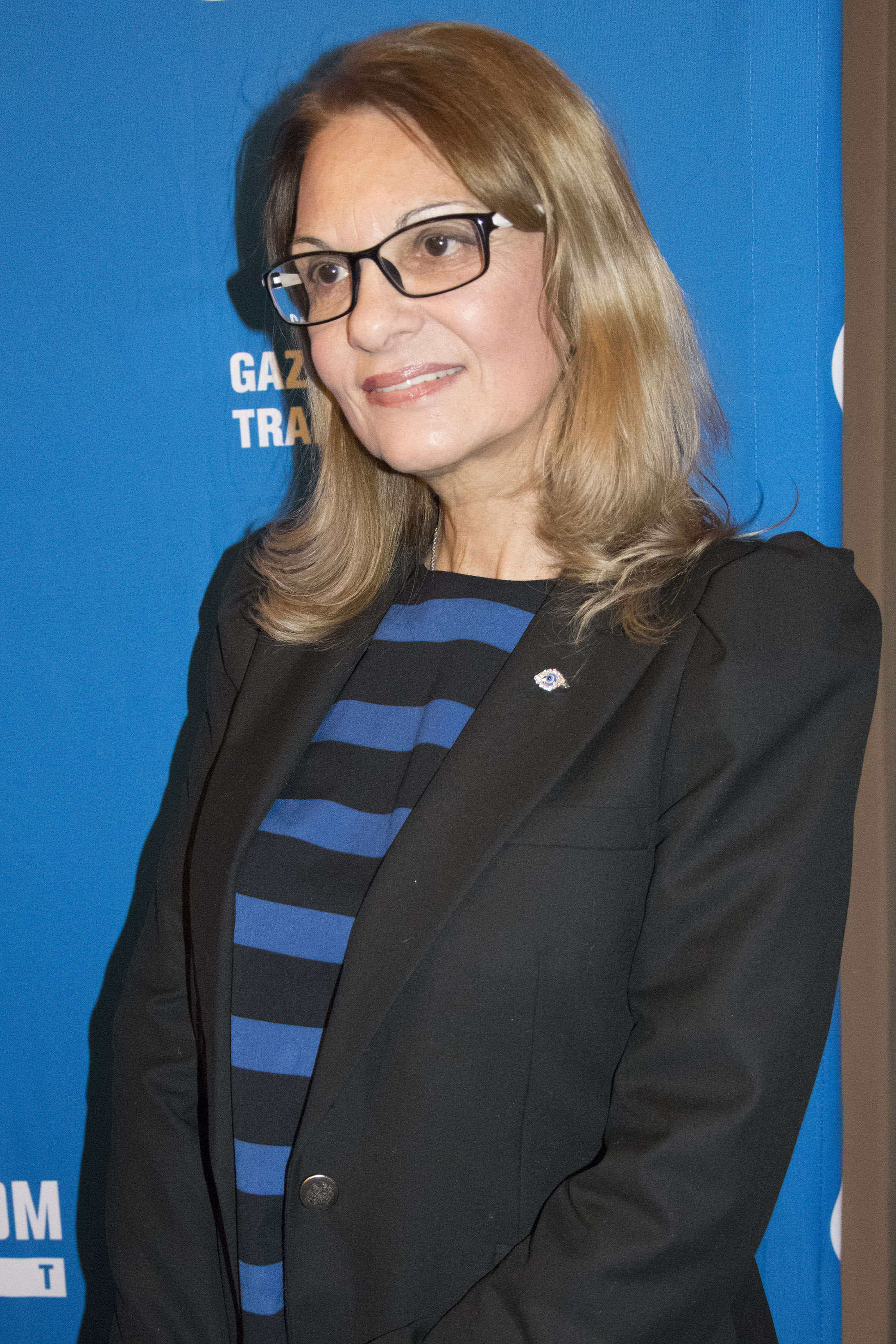
Svetlana Toma in 2016

Toma was born as Svetlana Andreevna Fomichyova in 1947 in Chișinău. Her father was Andrei V. Fomichev (originally from the village Somovka Dobrinsky District of the Lipetsk region), chairman of the "Truth" collective farm in the Balti area. Her Jewish mother, Ides Saulovna Sukhaya (?–1987), was a member of a communist underground movement (messenger) in Bessarabia in 1930; together with her sisters Bertha, Sarah, Rebecca, Ada, and Anna, she kept a collection of banned literature in her basement. Her parents met while her father studied at the Chișinău Agricultural Institute, where her mother worked as a secretary.

Svetlana Toma graduated from the acting department; an objective course of the Russian State Institute of Performing Arts. Her diploma was from the Chișinău Institute of Arts, named after Musicescu. She starred in many Moldovan films, and later in films by the Moldovan director, Emil Loteanu. Notable films include "Red Meadows" (1965), Lăutarii (1972), Queen of the Gypsies (1976) (the role of gypsy Rada), and Anna Pavlova (1983).

She became a member of the CPSU in 1978.

She also acted in films by other famous directors, including Vladimir Vengerov - "The Living Corpse" (1969), Yan Frid - "Pious Martha" (1982), Pavel Chukhray - "People in the ocean" (1979), Vladimir Basov - "Seven shouts in the ocean" (1981), Valeriy Ahadov - "Family business Gayurovyh"(1974), Rustam Ibragimbekov - "Solo for baritone and Orchestra" (1977) and others.

In the 1990s, she performed with a large concert program and toured with a combination company.

In 1999, together with other artists, she took part in a project with Victor Merezhko and composer Eugene Bednenko named "The Stars of Theater and Cinema are Singing," where she was a performer of retro songs. The outcome of this project was a concert and a CD, released in the US and on the "Radio MPS."

More recently, she performed in the play "Hostages of love" (N. Demchik, dir. G. Shaposhnikov, HRC "Russart") (combination company).

== Personal life and family ==
Svetlana Toma had a long and complex personal relationship with Emil Loteanu, whom she was going to marry.

Her first husband was her former classmate, the actor Oleg Lachin, who died in an accident in April 1973 at the age of 26. They had one daughter, Irina Lachina, born in 1972.

Svetlana's daughter and granddaughter are also in the film business. Her daughter, Irina Lachin, is an actress. Her granddaughter, Maria Budrina, born in 1991, is a film director.

Her second husband (2000-2005) is the playwright Andrey Vishnevsky.

== Honors ==
People's Artist of Moldova (2008). Honored Artist of Russia (2001).

== Trivia ==
- After her studies at the Arts Institution in Chișinău (1965–1969) as a movie and theater actress, she debuted at the Moldova-Film studio in 1966.
- Her last project was the Russian telenovela Bednaya Nastya.
- She was the presenter at the 7th Annual Russian Academy of Cinema Arts Awards in 1993.

== Filmography ==
- The Admirer (1999)
- Budem zhit (1995)
- Bluzhdayushchiye zvyozdy (1991)
- Igra v smert, ili postoronniy (1991)
- Dina (1990)
- Bez nadezhdy nadeyus (1989)
- Vdvoyom na grani vremeni (1989)
- Istoriya odnoy bilyardnoy komandi (1988)
- Zapadnya (1988)
- Chemi boshebi (1987)
- Dikiy veter (1986)
- Sem krikov v okeane (1986)
- Kak stat znamenitym (1984)
- Anna Pavlova (1983)
- Gmadlobt Ratili (1983)
- Kto stuchitsya v dver' ko mne (1982)
- Padeniye Kondora (1982)
- Tayna zapisnoy knizhki (1981)
- Lyudi v okeane (1980)
- U chertova logova (1980)
- Elodet mokavshires (1979)
- Ya khochu pet (1979)
- A Hunting Accident (1978)
- Podozritelnyy (1978)
- Bratyuzhka (1976)
- Gypsies Are Found Near Heaven (1975)
- Ekho goryachey doliny (1974)
- Dom dlya Serafima (1973)
- Lautarii (1971)
- Eto mgnovenie (1968)
- Zhivoy trup (1968)
- Krasnye polyany (1966)

== Television ==
- Poor Nastya (2003) as Sychikha
- Vorovka 2. Schastye na prokat (2002)
- Annual Russian Academy of Cinema Arts Awards (1993) as herself
- Luceafărul (1987) as Veronica Micle
- Kapitan Fracasse (1984) as Serafina
- Blagochestivaya Marta (1980)
- Sluchai na festivale (1976) as Viorica
