= Grigore Grigoriu =

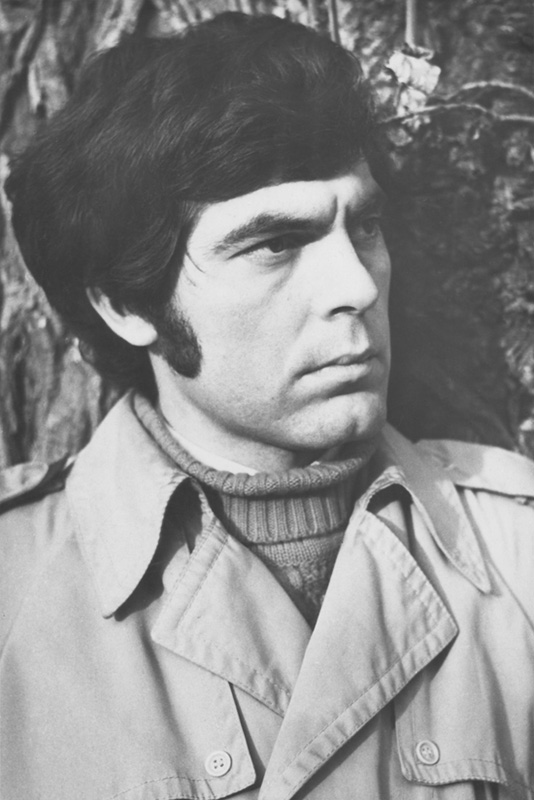
- Grigoriu in 1976
- Born: Grigore Petrovich Grigoriu; 4 April 1941; Causeni, Moldovan SSR, Soviet Union
- Died: 20 December 2003 (aged 62); Palanca, Moldova
- Years active: 1950–1989
- Spouse: Ekaterina Botnaryuk
- Children: Trayan; Octavian

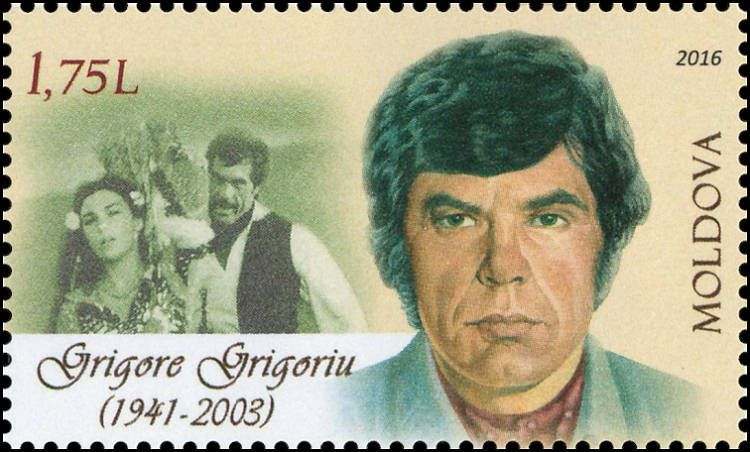
Grigoriu on a 2016 stamp of Moldova

Grigore Grigoriu (4 April 1941 – 20 December 2003) was an actor from the Moldova, known especially for interpreting the role of horse thief, Roma Loiko Zobar from the movie "Gypsies Are Found Near Heaven" (1975).

== Biography ==
Grigore Petrovich Grigoriu was born in 1941 in Căușeni, Moldova. In school, Grigore played in the theater, practiced sports, including boxing. After graduation, he worked briefly as a porter at a railway.

Grigore Grigoriu began his artistic career in the Bălți National Theatre where he worked for six years, from 1959 to 1965. Subsequently, he worked for five years in the TV-theater "Dialogue", after 1970 at the Republican Theater of the Young Spectator "Luceafarul".

His first film role was Sawa Milchan in the 1966 film by Emil Loteanu, Red Glades. Grigore Grigoriu acted in Russia, Romania, Germany, Azerbaijan, and Ukraine, performed more than seventy roles in film and theater. The most famous of his roles is Loiko Zobar in the film Gypsies Are Found Near Heaven.

Grigore Grigoriu was killed in a car accident on 20 December 2003 near the Moldovan village of Palanca. The actor is buried in the Central (Armenian) cemetery in Chișinău.

== Partial filmography ==
- Rasuna valea (1950) - Cupletist
- Red Glades (1966) - Savva Milciu
- Gorkie zyorna (1966)
- Marianna (1967)
- Annychka (1968) - Andrei
- Bratya Karamazovy (1969)
- Ofitser zapasa (1972) - Barbu
- Lăutarii (1972) - Radu Negostin
- Zemlya, do vostrebovaniya (1973) - Toscano
- Posledniy gaiduk (1973)
- Queen of the Gypsies (1975) - Loiko Zobar
- Night Over Chile (1977) - Manuel Valdivia
- Ich will euch sehen (1978) - Kommissar Ardatow
- A Hunting Accident (1978) - Polikhroniy Kalidis
- Anton the Magician (1978) - Sergeant
- Agent of the Secret Service (1978)
- Pugachev (1979) - Chika Zarubin
- Qariba adam (1979) - Vakil Ahmad
- Ya khochu pet (1979)
- The Gadfly (1980)
- Na Granatovykh ostrovakh (1981)
- Where Has Love Gone? (1981) - Viktor
- Romance with Amelie (1982) - Panzerkommandant
- U chertova logova (1982) - Gruya
- Naydi na schastye podkovu (1983)
- Anna Pavlova (1983, TV Series) - Mikhail Mordkin
- Kak stat znamenitym (1984)
- The Morning Star (1987)
- Maria și Mirabella în Tranzistoria (1989)
- Vdvoyom na grani vremeni (1989) - (final film role)
