= Margarita Pilikhina =

Russian cinematographer and educator (1926–1975)

Margarita Mikhailovna Pilikhina (Russian: Маргарита Михайловна Пилихина; 30 June 1926, Moscow – 13 March 1975, Moscow) was a Soviet and Russian cinematographer and pedagogue. She became an Honored Art Worker of the RSFSR in 1965.

== Biography ==
She was born in Moscow. Her great-uncle was Georgy Zhukov (1896-1974), Marshal of the Soviet Union.

In 1950, she graduated from the camera department Gerasimov Institute of Cinematography (VGIK), the workshop of Boris Volchek). Since graduation, she was a lecturer at VGIK and since 1970 was an associate professor at the institute.

Pilikhina was director of photography at M. Gorky Film Studio beginning in 1956. Nine years later she became the director of photography at the film studio "Mosfilm". Also in 1965, she lensed the Marlen Khutsiev classic I Am Twenty, which remains her best known work. In 1977, she published the book I Am a Cameraman.

She was a member of the Communist Party of the Soviet Union (CPSU) since 1956. She was a member of the Board Union of Cinematographers of the USSR since 1965, then she was Secretary of the Board, Head of the Creative Section of Cameramen.

She was buried at Novodevichy Cemetery.

== Selected filmography ==
=== Camera work ===
- 1956 — For the Power of the Soviets (dir. Boris Buneev)
- 1957 — Night Patrol (dir. Vladimir Sukhobokov)
- 1959 — Foma Gordeyev (dir. Mark Donskoy)
- 1959 — Ryzhik (dir. Ilya Frez)
- 1963 — Zastava Ilyich (dir. Marlen Khutsiev)
- 1965 — I Am Twenty (dir. Marlen Khutsiev)
- 1966 — Day Stars (dir. Igor Talankin)
- 1970 — Tchaikovsky (dir. Igor Talankin)
- 1973 — Matters of the Heart (dir. Azhdar Ibragimov)

=== Directing work ===
- 1975 — Anna Karenina (ballet film)

== Recognition ==
- 1958 - All-Union Film Festival - Encouragement diploma for camera work (film "Two from the same quarter")
- 1965 - Honored Art Worker of the RSFSR
- 1970 - Honored Worker of Culture of the Slovak Socialist Republic
- 1971 - Order of the Red Banner of Labour
- 1970 - San Sebastián International Film Festival - diploma for outstanding artistic and technical qualities (film "Tchaikovsky")
