= A Hunting Accident =

1978 film by Emil Loteanu

- Russian poster
- Directed by: Emil Loteanu
- Written by: Emil Loteanu; Anton Chekhov
- Based on: The Shooting Party by Anton Chekhov
- Starring: Galina Belyayeva; Oleg Yankovskiy; Kirill Lavrov; Leonid Markov; Svetlana Toma; Grigore Grigoriu
- Cinematography: Anatoli Petritsky
- Edited by: L. Knyazev
- Music by: Eugen Doga
- Production company: Mosfilm
- Release date: 1978
- Running time: 105 minutes
- Country: Soviet Union
- Language: Russian

A Hunting Accident (Russian: Мой ласковый и нежный зверь, romanized: Moy laskovyy i nezhnyy zver, lit. 'My Sweet and Tender Beast') is a 1978 Soviet historical romance directed by Emil Loteanu. It was entered into the 1978 Cannes Film Festival. It is adapted from Anton Chekhov's The Shooting Party.

== Plot ==
The film is set in the end of the 19th century and takes place at an aristocratic estate in the forests of central Russia. The daughter of a forester, Olga Skvortsova (Galina Belyayeva) is a beautiful nineteen-year-old woman. Three middle-aged men who live in the manor and the surrounding area fall in love with her: a 50-year-old gloomy widower Urbenin (Leonid Markov), an even more senior in age but youthful and lighthearted Count Karneev (Kirill Lavrov) and the stately, handsome, 40-year-old court investigator Kamyshev (Oleg Yankovsky). Olga wanting to escape poverty marries the nobleman Urbenin without love. On the day of her wedding she runs away from the celebration and declares her love to Kamyshev but refuses to leave with him. Kamyshev erupts with passion and jealousy and he secretly hopes that he can persuade Olga to be with him. She is under the impression that Urbenin is rich and that with him she will be able to break out of poverty but soon finds out in what lowly conditions her husband lives. After this disappointment she becomes a mistress of the jovial Count Karneev, while her lawful husband Urbenin slowly ruins himself with drink and degenerates in the city.

During the autumn hunt and picnic an intense argument happens between Olga and the fiercely jealous Kamyshev and after a few minutes under mysterious circumstances Olga receives a gunshot wound in the depths of the forest thicket. The young woman dies a few days later from severe blood loss without informing the investigators who attacked her at the shooting party. Her husband Urbenin is the main suspect and he is exiled to Siberia and dies four years later. Tormented by pangs of conscience Kamyshev writes a story about the dramatic events and submits it for publication in a journal. After reading the story by Kamyshev it becomes clear to the astute publisher (Olegar Fedoro) who was Olga's real murderer.

== Music ==
The Waltz now became a wedding first dance for many couples in love and the music initially composed by Eugen Doga for a movie became famous worldwide. Ronald Reagan called it "the Waltz of the century" when he visited Moscow. American figure skater Sasha Cohen skated to the waltz in her short program at the 2002 Winter Olympics. The music was used at the opening ceremony of the 2014 Olympic Games in Sochi. The Waltz was declared by UNESCO one of the four most beautiful musical masterpieces of the 20th century.

Victoria Demici, a British-Romanian writer, is the author of the lyrics versions of the famous Waltz 'My Sweet and Tender Beast'. She wrote both the Romanian (2012) and the English (2022) lyrics for Doga's masterpiece. Paula Seling and Catalina Caraus are singing the poetry versions of the Waltz.

Canadian ice-skater, Madeline Schizas, performed to the lyrics version of the Waltz during the 2022 Olympic Games in Beijing and made it to the third place.

American ice-skater, Isabeau Levito, skated to the poetry version written by Eugen Doga and Victoria Demici during the 2023 U.S. Figure Skating Championships. The 15-year-old ice-skater won the Gold Medal accompanied by the so-called Waltz of the Champions.

== Cast ==
- Galina Belyayeva as Olga (as Galya Belyayeva)
- Oleg Yankovsky as Kamyshev
- Kirill Lavrov as Count Karneyev
- Leonid Markov as Urbenin
- Svetlana Toma as Gypsy Tina
- Grigore Grigoriu (as Grigori Grigoriu) as Polychrony Arkadyevich Kalidis
- Vasili Simchich
- Olegar Fedoro as Publisher (as Oleg Fedorov)
- Vadim Vilsky as Doctor
- Anna Petrova (as Anya Petrova)
- Vladimir Matveyev (as Volodya Matveyev)
- Valeri Sokoloverov

== See also ==
- Summer Storm (1944)
