= You to Me, Me to You =

A Bargain for A Bargain (You to Me, Me to You)
- Russian: Ты — мне, я — тебе
- Directed by: Aleksandr Sery
- Written by: Grigori Gorin; Aleksandr Sery
- Starring: Leonid Kuravlyov; Tatyana Pelttser; Alla Meshcheryakova; Svetlana Svetlichnaya; Yuri Medvedev
- Cinematography: Viktor Listopadov
- Edited by: O. Elenko
- Music by: Gennadiy Gladkov
- Release date: 1976
- Country: Soviet Union
- Language: Russian

A Bargain for A Bargain (You to Me, Me to You) (Russian: Ты — мне, я — тебе) is a 1976 Soviet comedy film directed by Aleksandr Sery.

The film tells about the twin brothers, one of whom enjoys comfortable life in Moscow, being a banya employee who has "influential" clients, and the other works as a fishing inspector in his native village. But suddenly a disaster happened, and the first had to replace the second.

== Plot ==
Ivan Sergeyevich Kashkin (played by Leonid Kuravlyov) is a Moscow-based bathhouse attendant with an impressive list of influential clients who can provide access to scarce goods. Living by the motto "You scratch my back, I'll scratch yours," he enjoys a luxurious life by Soviet standards, owning a Zhiguli car, traveling abroad, and mingling with the elite.

His twin brother, Sergey Kashkin (also played by Leonid Kuravlyov), is an honest provincial inspector for the Fish Protection Agency, known for his strictness with poachers. When Sergey ends up in the hospital, he asks Ivan to fill in for him temporarily so that poachers won't take advantage of his absence. Ivan, applying his usual approach of "you scratch my back, I'll scratch yours," quickly makes new "friends" in this unfamiliar position. However, his leniency and lack of principles lead to disastrous consequences. The local factory continues dumping industrial waste into the river, and combined with the activities of poachers, this causes a massive die-off of sturgeon. Realizing the harm he's caused, Ivan rethinks his values and tries to remedy the situation.

Back in Moscow, he catches the main poacher and hands him over to the police.

A humorous subplot runs throughout the film, following a scientist named Vlyubchivy who is breeding a new species of fish, the "superophtalmus." This fish is entirely resistant to environmental pollution; however, once the river is cleaned, all the superophtalmus die.

== Cast ==
- Leonid Kuravlyov as Ivan Kashkin / Sergei Kashkin
- Tatyana Pelttser as Lyuba (as T. Pelttser)
- Alla Meshcheryakova as Vera (as A. Meshcheryakova)
- Svetlana Svetlichnaya as Valya (as S. Svetlichnaya)
- Yuri Medvedev as Stepan (as Yu. Medvedev)
- Valery Nosik as Grisha (as V. Nosik)
- Roman Tkachuk as Pantykhov (as R. Tkachuk)
- Evgeniy Shutov as Baturin (as E. Shutov)
- Ilya Rutberg
- Valentina Kareva as Katya (as V. Kareva)
