= Lidiya Belozyorova =

Ukrainian stage and screen actress (1945–2022)

- Лідія Бєлозьорова
- Born: Lidiya Oleksiivna Beloziorova; 31 March 1945; Kherson, Kherson Oblast, Ukrainian SSR
- Died: 15 February 2022 (aged 76); Vinnytsia, Vinnytsia Oblast, Ukraine
- Education: Kyiv National I. K. Karpenko-Kary Theatre, Cinema and Television University
- Occupation: Actress
- Awards: People's Artist of Ukraine; Merited Artist of Ukraine; Order of Princess Olga, 3rd class

Lidiya Oleksiivna Belozyorova (Ukrainian: Лідія Олексіївна Бєлозьорова; née Vakula; 31 March 1945 – 15 February 2022) was a Ukrainian actress of stage and screen. She began working as an artist at the Mykola Kulish Theatre and spent her professional working career at Rivne Musical-Dramatic Theatre between 1968 and 1969, then at Maria Zankovetska Theatre from 1969 to 1972 and finally at Musical-Dramatic Theatre Mykola Sadovskiy. Beloziorova performed in more than 100 drama and musical performances at Musical-Dramatic Theatre Mykola Sadovskiy. She was made a People's Artist of Ukraine, received the title of Merited Artist of Ukraine and earned the Order of Princess Olga, 3rd class.

== Biography ==
On 31 March 1945, Belozyorova was born in Kherson under the maiden name of Lidiia Vakula. In 1963, she began working as an artist at the Mykola Kulish Theatre. Belozyorova was a 1968 graduate of the Kyiv National I. K. Karpenko-Kary Theatre, Cinema and Television University.

She was an actress at the Rivne Musical-Dramatic Theatre from 1968 to 1969 and then at Maria Zankovetska Theatre between 1969 and 1972. In 1972, Belozyorova joined the Musical-Dramatic Theatre Mykola Sadovskiy, and acted in more than 100 drama and musical performances at the theatre. She had roles in cinema: she played the role of Paraska in the 1971 film Veseli Zhabokrychi, portrayed the cossack's wife in the 1972 Boris Ivchenko film The Lost Letter and Valeria in the 1975 Isaak Shmaruk film Simple Cares. Belozyorova had roles in the second, third, fourth, fifth and sixth series of the television programme Muhtar's Return in 2005 and 2007.

In theatre, she played the roles of Odarka in Zaporozhets za Dunayem; the titluar role in Natalka Poltavka; Maria in Twelfth Night; mother in Pominalnaya molitva; in La Bayadère; the titluar roles in Mirandolina and Khanuma; Lyubov Khvedorivna in Mazeppa; Bobrenchikha in Marusia Churai; Pamella in Dear Pamella; Aniela Dulska in The Morality of Mrs. Dulska; Bernarda Alba in The House of Bernarda Alba; Maria Voynitskaya in Uncle Vanya; Marcellina in The Marriage of Figaro; mother Maria in Autumn Melody; mother in Forest Song; Fenna Stepanivna in Shelmenko-dayman; Vronska in Anna Karenina; and Mavra in In I was digging a potion early on Sunday.... Belozyorova projected a strong voice that enabled her to combine acting with signing. She normally portrayed heroines of various ages, temperaments, characters and nationalities.

Belozyorova died on 15 February 2022 in Vinnytsia. On the afternoon of 17 February, a remembrance service was held for Beloziorova at Musical-Dramatic Theatre Mykola Sadovskiy in Vinnytsia, attended by members of the public.

== Awards ==
In 1993, she was made a People's Artist of Ukraine and had also received the title of Merited Artist of Ukraine. Belozyorova was named a laureate of the Nikolai Zarudny Prize in 2001 or 2002 "for theatrical work". In 2003, she received the Order of Princess Olga, 3rd class.
