= For the Power of the Soviets =

- Russian: За власть Советов
- Directed by: Boris Buneev
- Written by: Valentin Kataev; Semyon Klebanov
- Starring: Aleksey Alekseev; Boris Chirkov; Ilya Nabatov; Daniil Sagal
- Cinematography: Leonid Akimov; Vasili Dultsev; Margarita Pilikhina
- Music by: Mikhail Raukhverger
- Release date: 1956
- Running time: 93 minute
- Country: Soviet Union
- Language: Russian

For the Power of the Soviets (Russian: За власть Советов) is a 1956 Soviet World War II film directed by Boris Buneev

== Plot ==
The film takes place during the Great Patriotic War. The lawyer Bachey dreamed of going on a trip, but he had to go to the front. He was afraid that he would not soon see his father again, but met him in the Odessa catacombs, where partisans lived, led by a friend of Bachey. Bachey enters his squad...

== Cast ==
- Aleksey Alekseev as General
- Boris Chirkov as Secreatary Chernoivanenko
- Sergei Kurilov as Pyotr Bachei
- Ilya Nabatov as Ionel Mirya
- Daniil Sagal as Druzhinin
- Boris Tenin as Kolesnichuk
- Aleksey Vanin
- Anna Volgina as Klavdiya Ivanovna (as A. Volgina)
