= Leonid Markov =

Russian actor (1927–1991)

- Леонид Марков
- Born: Leonid Vasilyevich Markov; 13 December 1927; Alekseyevka, Kazakh ASSR, RSFSR, Soviet Union
- Died: 1 March 1991 (aged 63); Moscow, Soviet Union
- Occupation: Actor
- Years active: 1931–1991
- Relatives: Rimma Markova (sister)

Leonid Vasilyevich Markov (Russian: Леонид Васильевич Марков; 13 December 1927 – 1 March 1991) was a Soviet and Russian stage and film actor. People's Artist of the USSR (1985).

== Biography ==
Markov was born in the village of Alekseyevka (now Akkol). In the years 1931–1934, he played children's roles in the Saratov Drama Theater, where his father, actor Vasily Demyanovich Markov, worked.

In 1945, Leonid, together with his older sister, Rimma Markova, entered the studio of the Vologda Drama Theatre, where he studied until 1947.

At the end of the studio in 1951, Markov was admitted to the troupe of Lenin Komsomol, the scene of which debuted in 1947 as Nekhoda in the play The Honor of His Youth. Markov played Yasha and later Petya Trofimov in The Cherry Orchard by Anton Chekhov, Petrushin in The Living Corpse by Leo Tolstoy, and a number of other roles of the classical and contemporary repertoire.

In 1960, Markov moved to the Moscow Pushkin Drama Theatre, where, in particular, he played Timofey in Virgin Soil Upturned by Mikhail Sholokhov.

From 1966 to 1986, Markov served in the Moscow City Council Theatre, where he played a number of memorable roles, including Arbenin in Lermontov's Masquerade, Zvyagintsev in a dramatization of the novel Sholokhov's They Fought for Their Country; and Porfiry Petrovich in Petersburg Dreams (based on Fyodor Dostoevsky's novel Crime and Punishment). After a brief stint in 1986–1987 at the Maly Theater, where he played Antipas in the Maxim Gorky play The Zykovs, Markov returned to the Moscow City Council Theatre.

Markov died in Moscow from stomach cancer and was buried on the main avenue of the Kuzminskoye Cemetery.

== Filmography ==
- Zhukovsky (1950) as Listener (uncredited)
- Strong with Spirit (1967) as Oberleutnant
- The Sixth of July (1968) as Alexander Tsiurupa
- Russian Field (1971) as Avdey Petrovich Ugryumov
- You and Me (1971) as Sergei
- Investigation Led by Experts: The Escape (1973) as Bagrov
- A Hunting Accident (1978) as Pyotr Yegorovich Urbenin
- The Garage (1979) as Professor Pavel Konstantinovich Smirnovsky
- Mother Mary (1982) as Danila Skobtsov
- Treasure Island (1982) as Billy Bones
- Anna Pavlova (1983) as General Vladimir Bezobrazov
- Kindergarten (1983) as Imaginary blind
- Snake Catcher (1985) as Pyotr Vasilyevich Kotov

== Awards and honors ==
- Honored Artist of the RSFSR (1969)
- People's Artist of the RSFSR (1977)
- People's Artist of the USSR (1985)
- Order of the Red Banner of Labour (1987)
