= Summer Storm (1944 film) =

1944 film by Douglas Sirk

- Directed by: Douglas Sirk
- Screenplay by: Douglas Sirk (adaptation); Michael O'Hara (adaptation); Rowland Leigh (screenplay); Robert Thoeren (additional dialogue)
- Based on: The Shooting Party by Anton Chekhov
- Produced by: Seymour Nebenzal; Rudolf S. Joseph
- Starring: George Sanders; Linda Darnell; Edward Everett Horton; Anna Lee; Hugo Haas
- Cinematography: Archie Stout (front for); Eugen Schüfftan
- Music by: Karl Hajos
- Production companies: Angelus Pictures; Angelus Productions; Nero Films
- Distributed by: United Artists
- Release date: July 14, 1944 (United States)
- Running time: 106 minutes
- Country: United States
- Language: English
- Box office: $1,250,000

Summer Storm is a 1944 period romantic melodrama directed by Douglas Sirk, and starring Linda Darnell, George Sanders, Edward Everett Horton, and Anna Lee. It was based on Anton Chekhov's 1884 novel The Shooting Party, with the screenplay written by Rowland Leigh. Karl Hajos was nominated for the Academy Award for Best Music, Scoring of a Dramatic or Comedy Picture.

== Plot summary ==
1919 – Kharkov, Ukrainian People's Republic. Just after the Russian Revolution, Count Volsky, an impoverished former aristocrat, visits Nadena Kalenin, head of a publishing company. Volsky offers her a manuscript, written by his friend and Nadena's former fiancé, Judge Fedor “Fedya” Petroff. As Nadena reads, a flashback begins:

1912 – The small (fictional) resort town of Tyrneva, outside Kharkov. Fedya is the examining magistrate, engaged to Nadena, whose wealthy family summers there. One day, during a summer storm, Fedya and his best friend Volsky take shelter in a gazebo on Volsky’s estate. Asleep inside, they discover Olga, the daughter of Kuzma, Volsky’s woodcutter. Her beauty bewitches Fedya.

Olga agrees to marry Urbenin, Volsky’s middle-aged bookkeeper. She does not love him, but wants an escape from poverty. Olga and Fedya’s secret attraction continues to draw them throughout the wedding ceremony, until she runs off. Fedya chases her and Nadena discovers them kissing, dropping the dance card Fedya wrote “I Love You” on, which Fedya finds.

Brokenhearted, Nadena quietly calls off their engagement, as Fedya continues his affair with Olga, who dreams of escaping to America. Fedya soon learns Olga is also having an affair with Volsky. When Volsky’s jewels are stolen, Fedya confronts Olga and finds them, but Volsky refuses to believe she stole them, blaming Urbenin instead.

Later that night, Olga accuses Urbenin of striking her, winning Volsky’s sympathy. Olga continues to toy with Fedya, who is still in love with her. Olga asks Volsky to marry her. She does not love him either, but she can finally be wealthy.

The next day, Volsky throws a shooting party, while Urbenin prepares to leave, under a cloud of suspicion. Mad with jealousy, Fedya confronts Olga, who insists nothing has to change - she can marry Volsky, but continue her affair with Fedya. Soon after, Volsky’s maid Clara sees a man wash a knife in the river while she is swimming. Then Olga is discovered, stabbed and unconscious.

Fedya bumps into Nadena in the town church. He nearly confesses what he has done, but can’t bring himself to. As magistrate, Fedya is called to Volsky’s house to question Olga as she lies dying. She doesn’t name her assailant, saying she forgives her killer, because he loves her and taking Fedya’s hand. As she dies, Olga describes seeing "heavenly electricity", or lightning - the same thing that killed her mother.

The prosecutor charges Urbenin, based on the theft and abuse accusations against him and his history of jealousy and threats. Clara, the maid, comes forward, saying she can recognize the killer’s hands by his rings and their aristocratic appearance, only to realize, to her horror, that they are Fedya’s. She has unrequitedly loved him for years and promises to protect him and never utter a word.

At the trial, Clara’s stumbling testimony further incriminates Urbenin. Fedya nearly stands up and confesses to save Urbenin, but again cannot bring himself to. Urbenin is found guilty and given a life sentence of forced labor in the salt mines of Siberia.

Back in 1919 – Nadena finishes reading the book, gutted. She puts it in an envelope, addressed to the public prosecutor. Fedya returns to the squalid room he and Volsky share, discovering Volsky sold the book to Nadena, without knowing what it was about. Fedya confronts Nadena, who admits she couldn’t bring herself to mail it. She gives the package to Fedya and asks him to do the right thing and save an innocent man, giving her “one last chance to let me love you again.”

Fedya drops the package in a postbox, but immediately regrets the decision and assaults the postman, stealing his postbag. The police pursue Fedya into a bar, where they shoot him. As he dies, he, too, claims to see the "heavenly electricity." As Fedya’s corpse is carried away, the police discover on him only Nadena’s dance card from the wedding banquet, on which he wrote “I Love You.” It ends up discarded on the floor, swept up with the garbage and dumped in a trashcan.

== Cast ==
- George Sanders as Judge Fedor Petroff
- Linda Darnell as Olga Kuzminichna Urbenin
- Edward Everett Horton as Count "Piggy" Volsky
- Anna Lee as Nadena Kalenin
- Hugo Haas as Anton Urbenin
- Laurie Lane as Clara Heller
- John Philliber as Polycarp - Petroff's Butler
- Sig Ruman as Kuzma
- John Abbott as Lunin - Public Prosecutor
- Mary Servoss as Mrs. Kalenin
- André Charlot as Mr. Kalenin
- Robert Greig as Gregory - Volsky's Butler
- Nina Koshetz as Gypsy Singer
- Paul Hurst as Officer Orloff
- Charles Trowbridge as Doctor
- Sarah Padden as Beggar Woman
- Mike Mazurki as Tall Policeman

== Production ==
Director Douglas Sirk began developing this project while working at the UFA Studios in Germany. After fleeing to the United States in 1939, he continued developing the project, working for a time with James M. Cain, but discarding that draft, saying it was too American. Sirk receives screen credit for his work adapting the story.

== Reception ==
The film was notable in changing Linda Darnell's public image. While she had previously been playing innocent, good-natured roles, her performance as the seductive and manipulative Olga changed the public's opinion of her and transformed her into a sex symbol. She would go on to play more femme fatales in her career.

This is one of a handful of films in which Sanders’ singing voice can be heard (and in his native-born Russian). Like The North Star, this film was released in the United States during a period of pro-Russian sentiment and interest by the Allies at the height of World War II.

== See also ==
- A Hunting Accident (1978)
