= Irina Lachina =

Moldovan-Russian actress

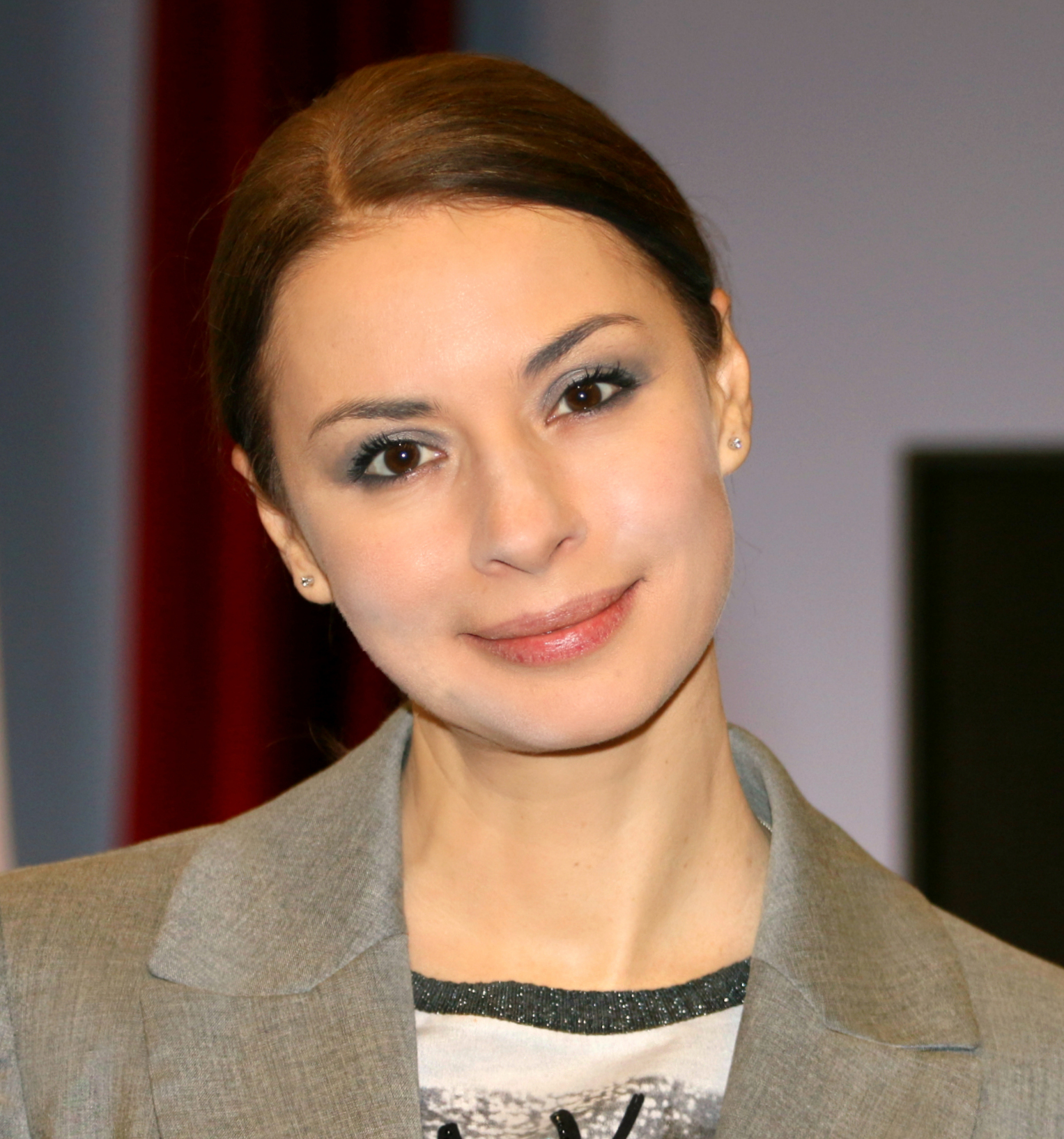
- Lachina in 2016
- Born: Irina Olegovna Lachina; August 29, 1972 (age 53); Bălți, Moldavian SSR, Soviet Union
- Occupation: Actress
- Years active: 1991-present
- Spouse: Oleg Budrin (divorced)
- Children: 1

Irina Olegovna Lachina (Russian: Ирина Олеговна Лачина, born 29 August 1972) is a Moldovan-Russian actress, the daughter of Svetlana Toma.

== Filmography ==
=== Films ===
- Flight Crew (2016) as passenger woman lawyer
- Legend № 17 (2012) as the spectator
- Tyajely pesok (Hard sands) (2008) as Rahil Rahlenko
- U Pana Boga w ogródku (2007) as Marusia
- A Hídember (2002) as Crescense
- Tayny dvortsovykh perevorotov (2001)
- U Pana Boga za piecem (1998) as Marusia
- Bluzhdayushchiye zvyozdy (1991) as Irina Toma

=== Television ===
- Filipp's Bay (2006) as Veronika
- Okhota na geniya (2006) as Sheyla
- Dzisay (2005)
- Luchshiy gorod Zemli (2003) as herself
- Lyudi i teni. Film vtoroy: Opticheskiy obman (2002) as Natasha
- Hellfire (1996) as young Carlotta
