= Under the Constellation Gemini =

1979 science fiction film

- Directed by: Boris Ivchenko
- Written by: Ivan Mykolaichuk; Igor Rosokhovatsky
- Starring: Vsevolod Gavrilov; Nikolaevich Yavorovsky; Gennady Shkuratov
- Cinematography: Sergei Stasenko
- Production company: Dovzhenko Film Studio
- Release date: October 1979 (Soviet Union)
- Running time: 83 minutes
- Country: Soviet Union
- Language: Russian

Under the Constellation Gemini (Russian: «Под созвездием Близнецов», romanized: Pod sozvezdiyem Bliznetsov) is a 1979 Soviet science fiction film directed by Boris Ivchenko based on the short story The Guest by Igor Rosokhovatsky.

== Plot ==
In one of the research institutes, the artificial brain Sigom, created under the guidance of Professor Yavorovsky, has disappeared. And also in the city there are strange phenomena: all the animals of the zoo are released from the cages, the books of the city information center are in disarray. And Sigom, having mastered the knowledge of science and fiction accumulated by mankind, he himself creates an artificial organism, returns to the professor and is soon sent to the constellation of Gemini.

== Cast ==
- Vsevolod Gavrilov - Alexander
- Nikolaevich Yavorovsky - Academician
- Gennady Shkuratov - Shigom
- Boris Belov - Semyon Antonovich Tarnov, Colonel of the Militia
- Gulcha Tashbaeva - Maria
- Alexander Pavlov - the commander of the aircraft
- Georgy Grechko - cameo
- Yaroslav Gavrilyuk - security guard
- Ivan Mykolaichuk - member of the crew of the aircraft
- Vyacheslav Zholobov - Dyatlov, a specialist in robotics
- Yury Rudchenko - policeman
- Zemfira Tsakhilova - Tatiana Vladimirovna, referent
