= Gypsies Are Found Near Heaven =

1975 film by Emil Loteanu

- Original film poster
- Directed by: Emil Loteanu
- Written by: Maxim Gorky (story); Emil Loteanu
- Produced by: Mosfilm
- Starring: Svetlana Toma; Grigore Grigoriu; Barasbi Mulayev; Mikhail Shishkov; Borislav Brondukov; Vasyl Symchych
- Cinematography: Sergei Vronsky
- Edited by: Nadezhda Vasilyeva
- Music by: Eugen Doga
- Production company: Mosfilm
- Distributed by: Sovexportfilm (US)
- Release dates: 1975; 20 October 1976 (Toronto Festival of Festivals); April 1979 (U.S.)
- Running time: 101 minutes
- Country: Soviet Union
- Language: Russian
- Box office: 64.9 million tickets

Gypsies Are Found Near Heaven (Russian: Табор уходит в небо, romanized: Tabor ukhodit v nebo, lit. "The Gypsy camp goes to heaven"; also known as Queen of the Gypsies) is a 1975 Soviet romantic drama film by Emil Loteanu, loosely based on short stories "Makar Chudra" and "Old Izergil" by Maxim Gorky. Set in early 20th century Austria-Hungary, the film tells a love story between the Roma girl Rada (Svetlana Toma) and the horse thief Loiko Zobar (Grigore Grigoriu).

It was the most attended movie in the Soviet Union in 1976, with 64.9 million tickets sold.

== Plot ==
The film takes place in the beginning of the 20th century in a Roma camp on the Tisza river in the Zakarpattia region on the outskirts of the Austro-Hungarian Empire.

Loiko Zobar is a horse thief who is injured and chased off into the woods while attempting to steal horses from the army. He is found by Rada, who heals his gunshot wound before disappearing. They meet again when Zobar encounters Bucha, a man who lives at the same encampment as Rada, at the market and the two return to her camp. He realizes she is the same woman who healed him, and resolves to impress her.

Antol Siladi, a landowner and nobleman, also falls in love with Rada after meeting her in the city. He asks Rada's father to buy her, but he refuses. Rada then rejects him in full view of her camp, and he curses her. Zobar steals a white mare to give to Rada, leading to attempts on his arrest from authorities. While hiding, he gets his affairs in order by sending his friend Talimin to collect a debt from the house of Balint. Balint refuses to pay for the horses he was given, and orders his servant to kill Talimin in the stables. When soldiers raid Zobar's encampment, his younger sister Rusalina makes resistance attempts. Zobar's father finally agrees to give them his location after they threaten to kill the community's horses.

Zobar is caught and sentenced to death by hanging. He escapes with the help of Bubulya, who is killed in the conflict. After burying him, Zobar catches up with Rada's camp and presents the mare to her. The two bond on the river bank, and Rada tells him that in the morning they should wed. When he wakes up, Zobar discovers that the camp, including Rada, had moved on without him.

He finds them with the help of a Romani medicine woman who stayed behind, and he publicly asks Rada for her hand in marriage. She whips his legs and turns him down, saying that he must kneel for her. He refuses, demanding she give him her hand first, and when she does not comply he becomes enraged and stabs her in the chest, killing her. Rada's father, having witnessed the exchange, kills Zobar in revenge by stabbing him in the back.

== Cast ==
- Svetlana Toma as Rada
- Grigore Grigoriu as Loiko Zobar
- Barasbi Mulayev as Makar Chudra, gypsy blacksmith
- Mikhail Shishkov as Nur, elder of the gypsy tabor
- Boryslav Brondukov as Bucha
- Vsevolod Gavrilov as Danilo, Rada's father
- Ion Sandri Scurea as Antol Siladi, landowner, nobleman, in love with Rada
- Nelli Volshaninova as Rusalina, Loiko's sister
- Pavel Andreychenko as Talimon
- Vasyl Symchych as Balint, landowner, murderer of Talimon
- Sergiu Finiti as Bubulya, Loiko's friend
- Nikolai Volshaninov as Aralambi
- Lyalya Chyornaya as Old Gypsy Woman
- Maria Kapnist as Izergil

== Production ==
Traditional Romani songs such as "Malyarkitsa", "Dyves and Rat", "Loli Phabay (The Red Apple)", and "Nane Tsoha" were chosen by composer Eugene Doga and covered for the film by Roma theater performers from the Romen Theatre. Many characters in the film were played by actors from Romen, the Moldavian film studio, or Lithuanian Film Studios due to significant filming in the cities of Vilnius and Kaunas.

== Awards ==
1976 — the main prize "Golden Shell" of the XXIV International Film Festival in San Sebastian (Spain).

1976 — Svetlana Toma was named the "Best Actress of 1976" according to the results of a survey of readers of the magazine "Soviet Screen" (USSR).

1977 — Audience jury prize "For Best Director" to Emil Loteanu at the VII International Film Festival of the best films of the world "Fest" in Belgrade (SFRY).

1977 — diploma for the best film of the International Film Festival in Prague (CSR).

1977 — the prize "For the best performance of a female role" to actress Svetlana Tome at the XV International Film Festival in Panama (Panama). XV International Film Festival in Panama.

1977 — 1-st degree diploma at the II All—Union Competition for the best use of domestic negative color films when shooting feature films (USSR). XV International Film Festival in Panama.

1978 — prize for the best quality of photography at the International Technical Film Competition of the XI UNIATEC Congress in Paris (France).

== See also ==
- Fictional representations of Roma
- Time of the Gypsies
