= Day Stars =

1966 Soviet Union film

- Russian: Дневные звёзды
- Directed by: Igor Talankin
- Written by: Olga Berggolts; Igor Talankin
- Starring: Alla Demidova; Andrei Popov; Konstantin Baranov; Tatyana Lennikova; Aleksandra Malysheva
- Cinematography: Margarita Pilikhina
- Edited by: Zoya Veryovkina
- Music by: Alfred Schnittke
- Release date: 1966
- Country: Soviet Union
- Language: Russian

Day Stars (Russian: Дневные звёзды) is a 1966 Soviet biographical drama film directed by Igor Talankin.

== Plot ==
The film tells about Olga Bergholz, the Soviet poet who achieved the greatest success during the siege of Leningrad.

== Cast ==
- Alla Demidova as Olga Bergholz
- Andrei Popov as Olga's father
- Konstantin Baranov
- Tatyana Lennikova
- Aleksandra Malysheva
- Yelena Borisova
- Ivan Ufimtsev
- Anatoly Ignatyev
