= Maria Mykolaichuk =

Ukrainian singer and actress

- Марія Миколайчук
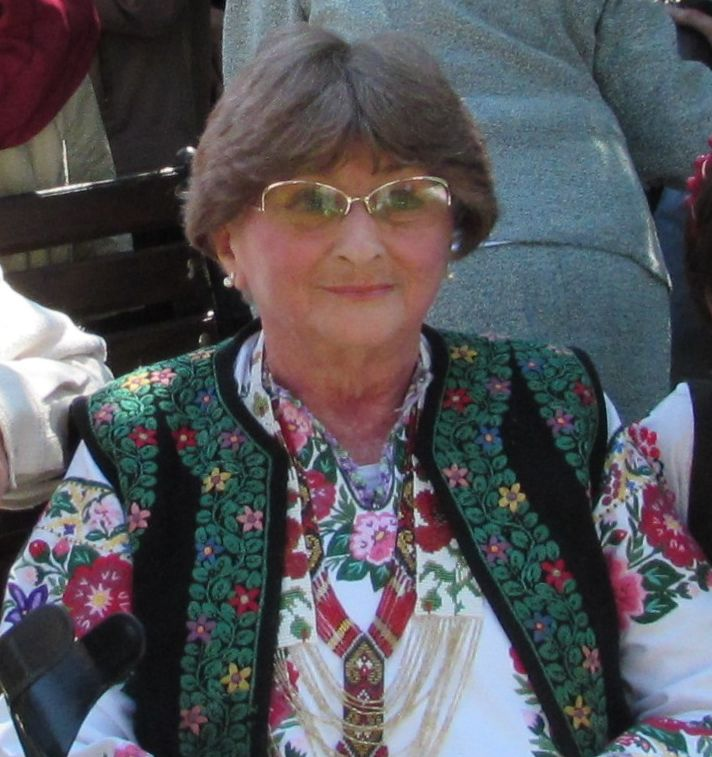
- Born: Maria Yevhenivna Kapiuk; April 8, 1941; Vytylivka, Chernivtsi Oblast, Ukrainian SSR
- Died: February 1, 2023 (aged 81); Chernivtsi, Ukraine
- Occupations: Singer; actress
- Spouse: Ivan Mykolaichuk (m. 1962)
- Honours: People's Artist of Ukraine

Maria Yevhenivna Mykolaichuk (Ukrainian: Марія Євгенівна Миколайчук; née Karpiuk (Карп'юк); April 8, 1941 – February 1, 2023) was a Ukrainian singer and actress. She was named People's Artist of Ukraine.

== Biography ==
Maria Yevhenivna Karpiuk was born on April 8, 1941, in the village of Vytylivka in Chernivtsi Oblast. In 1961, she graduated from the vocal studio at the O. Kobylianska Theater. That same year, she became a soloist in the Veryovka Ukrainian Folk Choir until 1973. In 1968, she became a member of the female a cappella trio Golden Keys which included Nina Matviienko and Valentyna Kovalska. The trio was initiated by her husband Ivan Mykolaichuk. From 1993 to 2012, she was part of the National Radio Company of Ukraine. She toured in CIS countries, Europe, the US and Canada. In 2021, she played her last film role in We are here. We are close. She died on February 1, 2023, at around 7 am in Chernivtsi. Her death was reported by the Chernivtsi Oblast Council. Ivan's nephew said that she died after a long illness. She was buried next to her husband Ivan at the Baikove Cemetery.

She knew her husband Ivan when they were both 16 years old. They married on August 29, 1962. She lived with him at a communal apartment. On her birthday in 1970, Ivan gave her the keys to a three-room apartment in Berezniaky, where they later lived together until Ivan's death in 1987.

In 2005, she was named People's Artist of Ukraine. That same year, a star for her was installed on the Alley of Stars in Chernivtsi.

== Discography ==
Year	Title	Ref(s)
2001	Proshchayus, Anhele, z toboyu	
2005	Bukovyno. Spivaye Mariya Mykolaychuk	
2009	Mariya Mykolaychuk. Oy, chervona kalynochko. Zolota kolektsiya	

== Filmography ==
Year	Title	Role	Ref(s)
1971	The White Bird Marked with Black		
1972	The Lost Letter		
	Girl's Dreams		
	The Golden Keys Trio		
2021	We are here. We are close.	Iryna Serhiivna	
