= Chortoryia =

Rural locality in Chernivtsi Oblast, Ukraine

Чортория Чортория
- Location in Chernivtsi Oblast
- Coordinates: 48°22′17″N 25°33′56″E
- Country: Ukraine
- Oblast: Chernivtsi Oblast
- Raion: Vyzhnytsia Raion
- Hromada: Brusnytsia rural hromada
- Time zone: UTC+2 (EET)
  - Summer (DST): UTC+3 (EEST)
- Postal code: 59352

Chortoryia (Ukrainian: Чортория) is a village in the Brusnytsia rural hromada of the Vyzhnytsia Raion of Chernivtsi Oblast in Ukraine.

== History ==
On 17 July 2020, as a result of the administrative-territorial reform and liquidation of the Kitsman Raion, the village became part of the Vyzhnytsia Raion.

== Religion ==
- Church of the Nativity of the Blessed Virgin Mary (1750, wooden).

== Notable residents ==
- Ivan Mykolaichuk (1941–1987), Ukrainian actor, producer, and screenwriter
