= Ivan Mykolaichuk =

Soviet Ukrainian actor (1941–1987)

Merited Artist Ivan Mykolaichuk
- Іван Миколайчук
- Mykolaichuk as Cossack Vasyl in The Lost Deed
- Born: 15 June 1941; Chortoryia, Ukrainian SSR, Soviet Union
- Died: 3 August 1987 (aged 46); Kyiv, Ukrainian SSR, Soviet Union
- Education: Karpenko-Karyi Memorial National University of Theatrical Arts
- Occupation: Film industry
- Years active: 1964–1987
- Known for: Acting, filmmaking
- Title: Merited Artist of the Ukrainian SSR
- Spouse: Maria Karpiuk
- Awards: Lenin's Komsomol Prize of Ukrainian SSR (1967); Shevchenko State Prize of Ukrainian SSR (1988)

Ivan Vasylyovych Mykolaichuk (Ukrainian: Іван Васильович Миколайчук; 15 June 1941 – 3 August 1987) was a Ukrainian actor, producer, and screen writer.

He is best known for playing the Hutsul Ivan in Shadows of Forgotten Ancestors (1964), based on Mykhailo Kotsyubynsky's book of the same name. He received the Komsomol prize of Ukraine in 1967, and the title of Honoured Artist of the Ukrainian SSR in 1968. He posthumously received the Shevchenko National Prize.

== Biography ==
Ivan Vasylovych Mykolaichuk was born in a village of Chortoryia (Kitsman Raion) in Western Ukraine during World War II in a family of peasants. Mykolaichuk graduated from a high school of the neighboring village of Brusnytsia (Kitsman Raion). In 1957, he finished the Chernivtsi Music College and in 1961 he graduated from the theater-studio of the Chernivtsi Music-Drama Theater of Kobylyanska. On 29 August 1962, Mykolaichuk married an actress of the theater (later the People's Artist of Ukraine) Maria Karpiuk.

In 1963–1965 he studied in the Karpenko-Karyi Memorial Kyiv Institute of Theatrical Arts (instructed by Viktor Ivchenko). During those years, Ivan debuted in the Leonid Osyka's movie Dvoye (The two).

His films were often controversial and suppressed by the Soviet authorities; sometimes his films were banned from being screened by the KGB. Due to incidents with the Parajanov's film Shadows of Forgotten Ancestors Mykolaichuk was banned from film industry for some five years by the party authorities being recognized as too nationalistic and a person of hostile ideology. Shadows of Forgotten Ancestors, which received the Gold Prize of the 7th Moscow International Film Festival in 1971, was perceived almost as a hostile attack by nationalistic forces.

In 1979 with the help of Vladimir Ivashko, who worked as the secretary of ideological work in the Kharkiv Regional Committee of the Communist Party of Ukraine, Mykolaichuk was given permission to direct the film Babylon XX, his directorial debut.

Mykolaichuk died in August 1987 at the age of 46. His house in Chortoryia has since been turned into a museum. He left a lasting legacy on Ukrainian film. Many consider him to be the greatest actor in the history of Ukrainian film. He also inspired other Ukrainian artists, actors, singers and writers who were searching for their Ukrainian identity in the Soviet era.

== Filmography ==
Actor
Year	Title	Medium	Role	Notes
1964	Shadows of Forgotten Ancestors	Film	Hutsul Ivan	Lenin Komsomol Prize of Ukraine (1967)
1964	The Dream	Film	Taras Shevchenko	
1965	The Viper	Film	White Guardian Brykin	
1966	Wild Grass	Film	Davyd Motuzka	
1967	Two deaths	Short		
1967	Kyiv Melodies	Documentary	composer	
1968	Scouts	Film	Viktor Kurhanov	
1968	The Stone Cross	Film	Mykola	
1968	Mistake of Honoré de Balzac	Film	Levko (jockey-serf)	
1968	Annychka	Film	Hutsul Roman	
1971	Zakhar Berkut	Film	Liubomyr	
1971	Commisars	Film	Hryhoriy Hromov	
1971	White Bird with Black Mark	Film	Petro Dzvonar	
1971	Liberation III: Direction of the Main Blow	Film	Sergeant Savchuk	
1971	Lady from Berendei Land	Film	Rei	
1971	I Go To You	Film	Painter	
1972	Treta sled slantzeto	Film	Bayan	
1972	The Lost Deed	Film	Cossack Vasyl	
1973	Contrary to Everything	Film	Ioko	
1973	When person smiled	Film	Oleksiy	
1974	About Vitya, Masha, and marines	Film	Vakula	
1974	Maryna	Film	conductor	
1975	Novella About a Woman	Film	writer	
1975	Waves of the Black Sea	Film	Terentiy	
1975	The Channel	Film	Zaychenko	
1977	The troubled month of Veresen	Film	Gnat	
1978	The Sea	Film	Simokhyn	
1978	The redemption of sins of others	Film	Rusyn	
1978	Under the Constellation Gemini	Film	Aircraft crew member	
1979	Babylon XX	Film	Fabian	
1979	More	Film		
1981	Such Late, Such Warm Autumn	Film	Hryhor Korchak	
1981	The Forest Song. Nymph	Film	Spirit of Forest / Uncle Leo	
1982	The Return of Batterfly	Film	Anton Krushelnytsky	
1983	On the edge of the sword	Film	General Turchyn	
1983	Myrhorod and its Inhabitants	TV movie	Kurochka	
1984	The Legend of Princess Olga	Film	Great Prince Vladimir the Great	
1986	Na ostriye mecha	Film		
1986	Zhmenyaks	Film	Pavlo Zhmenyak	(final film role)

Producer
Year	Title	Notes
1979	Babylon XX	All-Union Film Festival in Dushanbe (1980) - Best Director
1981	Such Late, Such Warm Autumn	

Writer
Year	Title	Notes
1971	White Bird with Black Mark	
1974	To Dream and to Live	
1977	The Unsociable Man	
1978	Under the Constellation Gemini	
1979	Babylon XX	
1981	So Late and Warm Autumn	
1986	And Memory Will Recall in the Sounds	
1989	Fables About Ivan	

== Accolades ==
- Lenin Komsomol Prize of the Ukrainian SSR (1967)
- Merited Artist of the Ukrainian SSR (1968)
- Shevchenko State Prize of the Ukrainian SSR (1988 posthumously) for performance of roles of Taras Shevchenko, Ivan Paliychuk, Davyd Motuzka, Hryhoriy Hromov, Petro Dzvonar, Fabian, and Hryhoriy Korchak in films "Dream", "Shadows of Forgotten Ancestors", "Weed", "Commissars", "White Bird with Black Mark", "Babylon-XX", and "Such late, such warm Autumn"
