= Shevchenko, Russia =

Shevchenko (Russian: Шевче́нко) is the name of several rural localities in Russia:

- Shevchenko, Republic of Adygea, a khutor in Teuchezhsky District of the Republic of Adygea
- Shevchenko, Kursk Oblast, a khutor in Sovetsky District of Kursk Oblast
- Shevchenko, name of several other rural localities
