= Such Late, Such Warm Autumn =

1981 Ukrainian Soviet film

Such Late, Such Warm Autumn (Russian: «Такая поздняя, такая тёплая осень», Ukrainian: «Така пізня, така тепла осінь») is a 1981 Soviet film directed by Ivan Mykolaychuk.

== Plot ==
The Bukovynian peasant Rusnak leaves the poor Bukovynian lands and goes to Canada with his little daughter Orissa - maybe he is lucky there? And now Rusnak, using the services of "Intourist", goes to his land, where he was once happy.
