= Palanka rural hromada =

Coordinates: 48°44′N 30°06′E

Palanka rural hromada Паланська сільська громада
- Hromada
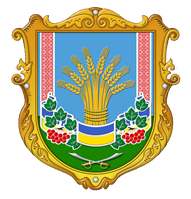
- Seal
- Interactive map of Palanka rural hromada
- Country: Ukraine
- Oblast: Cherkasy
- Raion: Uman

Area
  - Total: 482.6 km^{2} (186.3 sq mi)

Population
  - Total: 14,789
  - Density: 30.64/km^{2} (79.37/sq mi)
- Settlements: 18
- Villages: 18
- Website: palanska-gromada.gov.ua

Palanka rural hromada is a hromada in the Uman Raion of Cherkasy Oblast of Ukraine. Its administrative centre is the village of Palanka.

== Composition ==
The hromada includes 18 villages:

- Antonivka
- Berestivets
- Cherpovody
- Horodetske
- Hromy
- Ivanivka
- Kocherzhyntsi
- Kochubiivka
- Krasnopilka
- Maksymivka
- Palanka (administrative centre)
- Pikivets
- Posukhivka
- Rodnykivka
- Synytsia
- Tomashivka
- Yarovatka
- Yurkivka
