= Shevchenkivskyi District =

Shevchenkivskyi District or Shevchenko Raion is a name of several urban districts (raions) in Ukraine. The name derives from Taras Shevchenko.

It may refer to:

- Shevchenkivskyi District, Chernivtsi, a former urban district in the city of Chernivtsi
- Shevchenkivskyi District, Dnipro, an urban district in the city of Dnipro
- Shevchenkivskyi District, Kharkiv, an urban district in the city of Kharkiv
- Shevchenkivskyi District, Kyiv, an urban district in the Ukrainian capital Kyiv
- Shevchenkivskyi District, Luhansk, an urban district in the city of Luhansk
- Shevchenkivskyi District, Lviv, an urban district in the city of Lviv
- Shevchenkivskyi District, Zaporizhzhia, an urban district in the city of Zaporizhzhia

== See also ==
- Korsun-Shevchenkivskyi Raion, a former raion in Cherkasy Oblast
