= Mocra =

Mocra Мокра (Russian) Мокра (Ukrainian)
- Commune
- Location within Moldova
- Coordinates: 47°37′44″N 29°8′56″E
- Country (de jure): Moldova
- Country (de facto): Transnistria (Note: Transnistria's political status is disputed. It considers itself to be an independent state, but this is not recognised by any UN member state. The Moldovan government and the international community consider Transnistria a part of Moldova's territory.)
- Elevation: 140 m (460 ft)
- Time zone: UTC+2 (EET)
  - Summer (DST): UTC+3 (EEST)

Mocra (Ukrainian: Мокра; Russian: Мокра; Polish: Mokra) is a commune in the Rîbnița District of Transnistria, Moldova. It is composed of four villages: Basarabca (Бессарабка), Mocra, Șevcenco (Шевченко) and Zaporojeț (Запорожець, Запорожец). It has since 1990 been administered as a part of the self-proclaimed Pridnestrovian Moldavian Republic.

== History ==
Mokra, as it was known in Polish, was a private village of the Lubomirski family, administratively located in the Bracław County in the Bracław Voivodeship in the Lesser Poland Province of the Kingdom of Poland. Following the Second Partition of Poland, it was annexed by Russia. In the late 19th century, it had a population of 450.

In 1924, it became part of the Moldavian Autonomous Oblast, which was soon converted into the Moldavian Autonomous Soviet Socialist Republic, and the Moldavian Soviet Socialist Republic in 1940 during World War II. From 1941 to 1944, it was administered by Romania as part of the Transnistria Governorate.

According to the 2004 census, the population of the village was 1,563 inhabitants, of which 933 (59.69%) were Moldovans (Romanians), 560 (35.82%) Ukrainians and 58 (3.71%) Russians.

== Notable people ==
- Eugen Doga
