= Lyalya Chyornaya =

Soviet actress (1909–1982)

- Born: Nadezhda Sergeyevna Khmeleva; 15 February 1909; Nalchik, Terek Oblast, Russian Empire
- Died: 2 September 1982 (aged 73); Moscow, USSR
- Occupations: Actor; singer; dancer
- Years active: 1922–1979
- Spouse(s): Ivan Rom-Lebedev (divorce); Mikhail Yanshin (divorce); Nikolai Khmelyov
- Children: 1

Lyalya Chyornaya (Russian: Ляля Чёрная; 1909–1982) was a Soviet actress of theater and cinema, Honored Artist of the RSFSR, actress of the Romen Theatre, dancer, singer of gypsy songs and romances.

She was born in 1909 in Nalchik.

At the age of 13 she entered the professional stage for the first time as a dancer in Polyakova's choir, where she worked until the opening of the theater Romen. From the day of its foundation in 1931 until 1972, Lyalya Chyornaya worked at the theater Romen. She played more than 35 roles (including main roles) in theater productions, starred in the film The Last Campaign as Alta.

In many respects she influenced the formation of the variety manner of the dance.
