= Vasyl Symchych =

Ukrainian actor

Vasyl Ilich Symchych (Ukrainian: Василь Ілліч Симчич) (January 8, 1915 – March 1, 1978) was a Ukrainian actor.

Vasyl Symchych was born in Seredniy Bereziv, Kolomyya powiat, Austro-Hungary (today Ivano-Frankivsk Oblast).

== Partial filmography ==
- 1955: Ivan Franko ("Іван Фpaнкo") (Ukrainian SSR)
- 1964: Tsari - Andrey Romanovich, teacher
- 1968: Annychka ("Анничка") (Ukrainian SSR) - Semen
- 1968: Zakhar Berkut ("Зaxap Бepкут") (Ukrainian SSR) - Zakhar Berkut
- 1968: The Stone Cross (Камінний хрест) (Ukrainian SSR) - Georgi
- 1971: The White Bird Marked with Black ("Білий птах з чорною ознакою") (Ukrainian SSR) - Father Myron
- 1972: Zozulya s diplomom - Granpa Karpo
- 1972: The Lost Deed ("Пропала грамота") (Ukrainian SSR) - the father of cossack Vasyl
- 1972: Defying Everybody ("Наперекор всему")
- 1973: Naperekor vsemu - Slijepi starac
- 1973: Posledniy gaiduk - Pastukh
- 1973: Svadba
- 1973: To the last minute ("Дo последней минуты") - pai Meletiy Budzinovsky
- 1973: Did Livogo Kraynogo - Maksym Besarab
- 1974: Do posledney minuty - Budzinovskiy
- 1974: The Deluge ("Potop") (Poland)
- 1974: Esli khochesh byt schastlivym - Sergey Aleksandrovich
- 1974: Velnio nuotaka - Baltaragis
- 1975: Perskeltas dangus
- 1975: Povest o zhenshchine - Nechay
- 1976: Gypsies Are Found Near Heaven ("Табор уходит в небо") (Moldavian SSR) - Balint
- 1978: Duma o Kovpake: Karpaty, Karpaty... - Ivanochko
- 1978: A Hunting Accident ("Мoй ласковый и нeжный звeрь") - Nikolay Skortsov
- 1978: Vospominaniye... - (final film role)
