= The Lost Letter (1972 film) =

1972 film by Borys Ivchenko

Propala Hramota The Lost Letter
- Directed by: Borys Ivchenko
- Written by: Ivan Drach
- Produced by: Dovzhenko Film Studios
- Starring: Vasyl Simchych; Ivan Mykolaichuk; Mykhailo Holubovych; Lidia Vakula; Fedir Stryhun
- Cinematography: Vitaliy Zymovets
- Music by: Ukrainian folklore Yevhen Adamtsevych
- Production company: Dovzhenko Film Studios
- Release date: 1983
- Running time: 70 minutes
- Country: Soviet Union (Ukrainian SSR)
- Language: Ukrainian (Russian selected scenes)

The Lost Letter (Ukrainian: «Пропала грамота», romanized: Propala hramota; Russian: «Пропавшая грамота», romanized: Propavshaya gramota) is a 1972 Soviet Ukrainian musical-tragicomedy film by Dovzhenko Film Studios in Kyiv. The film is based on the novella The Lost Letter: A Tale Told by the Sexton of the N...Church by Nikolai Gogol from the 1832 cycle Evenings on a Farm Near Dikanka.

== Synopsis ==
Cossack Vasyl (Ivan Mykolaichuk) prepares himself for a mounted voyage to Peterburg, the capital of the Russian Empire. Vasyl carries a hramota (sealed official document) given to him by the hetman through his secretary, Pereverny-Kruchenko, that is rumored to cost ten poods of gold. Vasyl's wife sews the hramota into his hat, and his father (Vasyl Symchych) gives him magic tobacco to repel evil and advice to find a good co-journeyman.

The film depicts the adventures of Vasyl in sequences that are filled with Ukrainian culture, and shows Ukrainian cuisine, costumes, traditions, mystical and comedy-filled situations, anecdotes, and a plethora of obstacles which Vasyl must overcome. On his way together with an evil servant (chort) he comes to a river crossing where a ferry carries people from one side to another. There he finds his partner in arms, Andriy, a zaporozhian cossack. Further along the way, something happens to the papers when they stop at an inn to rest. When Vasyl and Andriy arrive in St. Petersburg, they hand over the hramota to the baroness von Likhtenberg who passes them to the empress. The documents do not carry any information and Vasyl has to leave without results.

On the way home, both of them decide to shoot themselves. As they are saying in unison the Nicene Creed (Apostles' Creed) they hear a voice that identifies itself as Kudz coming from a nearby rock, saying he was the same chort and the witch turned him into a rock after he helped Vasyl. Kudz asks them to throw him in a nearby marsh so as not to cause any further harm to random travelers on the road. As Vasyl arrives with his friend near their village, Dykanka, they meet a little boy who asks them to let him go to see the cossack, Vasyl who had supposedly returned from having seen the empress. Then they arrive and are met by the rest of the village population. Moments later, everybody awaits Vasyl again by his house to tell the story of his rendezvous with the empress. In the last scene, he wishes the little boy to have a loyal horse, an open field, and always be at people's service. The scene is accompanied by the triumphant Zaporizhian March about Hetman Sahaidachny.

== Cast ==
- Ivan Mykolaichuk as cossack Vasyl
- Lidia Vakula as cossack's wife, the empress
- Fedir Stryhun as zaporozhets Andriy, cossack's partner
- Zemfira Tsakhilova as Odarka, baroness von Likhtenberg
- Mikhail Golubovich as evil man (the role voiced actor Pavel Morozenko)
  - He's seen on the background of the photo as the owner of the inn (Ukrainian: корчмар, korchmar) in the episode
- Volodymyr Hlukhyi as weird man
- Vasyl Symchych as cossack's father
- Anatoliy Barchuk as cossack Ivan
- Volodymyr Shakalo as cossack Petro
- Maria Kapnist as witch

== Administrative issues ==
The film was supposed to be directed by Viktor Hres, featuring Anatoly Papanov in the lead role. However, when Hres became suddenly ill, he offered it to Borys Ivchenko. The latter agreed on the condition that the main role would be given to Ivan Mykolaychuk. The script was remade and the movie was filmed in 1972 at the Dovzhenko Film Studios. However, Soviet censors banned it from being screened. Nevertheless, in 1973 the Bureau of Soviet Cinematography Propaganda in Moscow published 50 thousand pamphlets with images of Ivan Mykolaychuk in the role of Cossack Vasyl.

The movie was finally released in 1983. It received the Golden Pagoda Award during the movie festival in Bangkok (see Cinema of Thailand). All the songs in the movie were contributed by Ivan Mykolaychuk, who also helped Ivan Drach write the movie's script.

== See also ==
- The Lost Letter: A Tale Told by the Sexton of the N...Church (1831), by Mykola Hohol.
- The Lost Letter (1945), a Soviet, Russian-language cartoon filmed in Moscow.
- Annychka (1968), another film by Borys Ivchenko.
- Cinema of Ukraine
- Dovzhenko Film Studios

== Links ==
- The Lost Letter at IMDb
- Brief overview at The New York Times as Propavshaya Gramota
- Some cast info
