= Annychka =

1968 film by Borys Ivchenko

- Original film poster
- Directed by: Borys Ivchenko
- Written by: Viktor Ivchenko
- Starring: Lyubov Rumyantseva; Grigore Grigoriu; Ivan Mykolaychuk; Konstantin Stepankov; Ivan Havrylyuk; Borislav Brondukov
- Production company: Dovzhenko Film Studios
- Release date: 1968
- Running time: 89 minutes
- Country: Soviet Union
- Languages: Russian; Ukrainian

Annychka (Russian: «Аннычка», romanized: Annychka, Ukrainian: «Анничка») is a 1968 Soviet-Ukrainian drama. The film, which was produced at the Dovzhenko Film Studios, takes place in 1943 and is about a Hutsul girl played by Lyubov Rumyantseva. In 1969, it received a Golden Tower award at the Phnom Penh Film Festival in Cambodia. The director received a special prize at the Kyiv Film Festival. In the USSR alone, in 1969 25.1 million people saw it.

== Synopsis ==
The film dwells of the love story in the midst of the Second World War in 1943. A Hutsul girl Annychka finds herself in the middle of hostilities and gets acquainted with a wounded soldier in the forest. Looking after the soldier, she falls in love with him and turns against her boyfriend in the village, who became a Nazi collaborator. Having told her father of the decision to elope with the soldier she drives her father to despair and eventual insanity. The story ends on a tragic note, when the father kills his daughter.

== Cast ==
- Lyubov Rumyantseva as Annychka, Anna Kmet, daughter of pan Kmet
- Grigore Grigoriu as Andrei, wounded Red Army soldier from Central Ukraine
- Konstantin Stepankov as pan Kmet, wealthy Hutsul
- Ivan Mykolaichuk as Roman Derych, Annychka's groom, young Hutsul, who becomes a German Hilfspolizei and guard in a detention center for prisoners of war
- Boryslav Brondukov as Krupyak, he is also pan Krupenko, chief Hilfspolizei officer
- Anatoly Barchuk as Yaroslav, pan Kmytiv's farmhand
- Ivan Havrilyuk as Ivanko, young Hutsul, Roman's friend, partisan sympathizer, whom the Hilfspolizei with the fascists made dance on broken glass and then shot
- Olga Nozhkyna as Maria, Annychka's mother
- Vasyl Symchych as Semyon, pan Kmet's farmhand
- Fedir Stryhun as Fyodor, partisan
- Vitaly Rozstalny as Viktor, partisan
- Nynel Zhukovskaya as Seraphima, priest's daughter
- Viktor Stepanenko as Viktor, Soviet prisoner
- Viktor Miroshnichenko as village headman

== See also ==
Propala Hramota (1972) — other work of Borys Ivchenko
