= Anna Pavlova (film) =

1983 biographical film directed by Emil Loteanu

- Directed by: Emil Loteanu
- Screenplay by: Emil Loteanu
- Story by: Emil Loteanu
- Produced by: Michael Powell
- Starring: Galina Belyayeva; Lina Buldakova; Sergey Shakurov; Vsevolod Larionov; James Fox
- Cinematography: Yevgeny Guslinsky
- Edited by: Irina Kalatikova; Elena Galkina; Jim Connock
- Music by: Eugen Doga
- Production companies: Poseidon Films; Mosfilm; Sovinfilm
- Distributed by: Poseidon Film Distributors
- Release dates: August 1983 (Soviet Union); March 10, 1985 (United Kingdom)
- Running time: 155 minutes (original cut); 133 minutes (UK cut); 275 minutes (TV cut)
- Countries: Soviet Union; United Kingdom
- Languages: English; Russian

Anna Pavlova, also known as A Woman for All Time, is a 1983 biographical drama film depicting the life of the Russian ballet dancer Anna Pavlova, written and directed by Emil Loteanu and starring Galina Belyayeva, James Fox and Sergey Shakurov. It depicts Pavlova's passion for art and her collaboration with the reformers of ballet including Michel Fokine, Vaslav Nijinsky and Sergei Diaghilev.

A co-production between the United Kingdom and the Soviet Union, famed British director Michael Powell served as a producer and featured American director Martin Scorsese in a cameo role.

== Plot ==
The film opens in the cold Saint Petersburg with a scene where Anna as a young girl observes through a window young dancers practicing. Although she catches a cold, Anna decides that she does not merely want to be a dancer, but that she wants to be one of the best.

It is shown how classical master dancer/ballet teacher Marius Petipa helps Anna to the path to glory and her rise in the imperial Mariinsky Theatre in St. Petersburg. Here, she meets the young choreographer Mikhail Fokine with whom she rehearses the world-famous solo The Dying Swan.

In 1909, Sergei Diaghilev founds the Ballets Russes in Paris for which he recruits the best Russian dancers and choreographers, including Anna Pavlova. But, after a short time, she decided to move to London. Here, she also celebrates major success and her triumph is worldwide; she performs in the United States, Mexico and Venezuela. Accompanying her is Victor Dandré – her manager, companion and husband.

Her biggest wish to once again to perform at her native Mariinsky Theatre remained unfulfilled. Anna died from pneumonia at the age of 49 in the year 1931, during her farewell tour in The Hague.

== Cast ==
- Galina Belyayeva as Anna Pavlova
  - Lina Buldakova as young Anna
  - Valentina Gannibaliva as Anna's dancing double
- Sergey Shakurov as Michel Fokine
- Vsevolod Larionov as Sergei Diaghilev
- James Fox as Victor Dandré (voice dubbed by Robert Rietti)
- Mikhaill Krapivin as Vaslav Nijinsky
- Svetlana Toma as Anna's mother
- Georgio Dimitriou as Enrico Cecchetti
- Natalya Fateyeva as Mathilde Kschessinska
- Pyotr Gusev as Marius Petipa
- Anatoli Romashin as Alexandre Benois
- Igor Dmitriev as Léon Bakst
- Jacques Debary as Camille Saint-Saëns
- Igor Sklyar as Serge Lifar
- Grigore Grigoriu as Mikhail Mordkin
- Tiit Härm as Alexandre Volinine
- Leonid Markov as Nikolai Bezobrazov
- Viktor Sergachyov as Vladimir Teliakovsky
- Vsevolod Safonov as Vladimir Frederiks
- Nikolai Kryukov as Oscar II of Sweden
- Martin Scorsese as Giulio Gatti-Casazza
- John Murray as Sol Hurok
- Bruce Forsyth as Alfred Batt
- Roy Kinnear as Gardener
- Svetlana Svetlichnaya as Masha
- Afanasi Trishkin as Sergeyev
- Emil Loteanu as Cabaret director
- Galina Kravchenko

== Production ==
Martin Scorsese, a great admirer of Michael Powell's films, originally convinced Robert De Niro to play the American impresario Sol Hurok and Jack Nicholson to portray Pavlova's husband and manager, Victor Dandré. The casting was rejected by the Russian Ministry of Culture, as The Deer Hunter in which De Niro acted was conceived as anti-Communist, and Nicholson had made disparaging remarks about the Soviet Union in interviews. Nicholson's role was eventually played by James Fox and De Niro's by John Murray, the brother of Bill Murray.

The ensemble of the Leningrad Kirov Ballet danced the original choreography, and in original decor and most of Pavlova's repertoire is performed.

=== Post-production ===
There were tensions at Mosfilm during editing due to its almost three-hour length. The contract stated that Loteanu had control over the English version, yet the film was shortened dramatically. Loteanu stated "Had I known at the outset that the contract would be broken, I would not have made the film at all."

== Release ==
Anna Pavlova was theatrically released in the Soviet Union in August 1983, via its original 155-minute version. It was released in the United Kingdom on 10 March 1985, in a 133-minute edit.

The television version, which premiered in 1986, consists of five parts, each 55 minutes apiece: "Rossi Street", "Undying Swan", "Tulips and Loneliness", "Dreams of Russia" and "Touching the Sunset".
