= Lăutarii =

- Film poster
- Directed by: Emil Loteanu
- Written by: Emil Loteanu
- Produced by: N. Paliy
- Cinematography: Vitali Kalashnikov
- Edited by: V. Slavich-Dimitriu
- Music by: Eugen Doga; Isidor Burdin
- Production company: Moldova Film
- Distributed by: International Film Exchange (IFEX)
- Release date: 1972
- Running time: 141 minutes
- Countries: Soviet Union, Moldova
- Languages: Russian, Romanian

Lăutarii (Russian: Лаутары) is a 1972 Soviet romantic musical film directed by Emil Loteanu. The movie was a success, particularly in Italy. The film received the Special Jury Award at the San Sebastián International Film Festival in 1972. The film also received the prestigious Spanish San Fedele prize in 1978.

== Plot ==
Toma Alistar is a gifted lăutar who works as the leader of a traveling gypsy band, wandering the steppes of the mid-nineteenth century Bessarabia. He is a skilled violinist whose fame takes him on tours around European capitals and royal courts. He falls madly in love with the beautiful gypsy Leanca. However, she is marrying a rich Hungarian. Toma spends the rest of life and his fortunes in a desperate search for her. And only before his death he meets an old gypsy woman in whom he recognizes his one true love.

== Cast ==
- Sergei Lunchevici as Toma Alistar
- Dumitru Hăbășescu as young Toma
- Jenea Rolko as Toma as a child
- Galina Vodniațkaia as old Leanca
- Olga Câmpeanu as young Leanca
- Angelica Iașcencu as Leanca as a child

== See also ==
- Lăutărească music
