= Duck Village. A Tale. =

- Russian: Деревня Утка
- Directed by: Boris Buneev
- Written by: Aleksandr Aleksandrov
- Starring: Rolan Bykov; Oksana Duben; Evdokiya Alekseeva; Elena Sanaeva; Aleksandr Potapov
- Cinematography: Valeri Ginzburg
- Edited by: Nina Bozhikova; Svetlana Frolenko
- Music by: Yevgeny Gevorgyan
- Release date: 1976
- Country: Soviet Union
- Language: Russian

Duck Village. A Tale. (Russian: Деревня Утка) is a 1976 Soviet family film directed by Boris Buneev.

The film tells about a girl named Olya, who spends her holidays with her grandmother and learns from her that a shishiga lives in their house. Believing this, she sees him and spends all her holidays with him.

== Plot ==
Eight-year-old Olya (Oksana Duben) goes to spend her summer vacation with her grandmother in the village of Utka. There, her grandmother tells her stories of mysterious creatures she calls "shishki," while a neighbor refers to them as devils. Bored in the countryside, Olya becomes intrigued by these tales and asks her grandmother more about the shishki. Soon enough, Olya encounters one herself—a kind, gentle creature named Shishok (played by Rolan Bykov) who lives in her grandmother's home. Shishok feels saddened by how children, as they grow up, can no longer see him.

Olya and Shishok quickly become friends and even plan a trip to Scotland to visit Shishok’s friend, a Scottish brownie named Brownie (played by Georgy Millyar). However, their “happiness machine,” a contraption for travel that doubles as a washing machine, breaks down when Shishok removes its only nail. When the summer ends, Olya’s uncle plans to take her grandmother back to the city, but she ultimately decides to stay in the village. Unaware of her choice, Shishok goes with Olya to the city, moving into her apartment and settling in closets and cabinets since there’s no attic. On the last day of summer, they visit a park where they meet Brownie, who has come from Scotland for a symposium on unexplained phenomena. Visiting Olya’s neighbor, a professor who denies the existence of shishki but is himself one, they have a delightful time together. By the end, Shishok returns to the village to stay in the home where Olya’s grandmother remains.

== Cast ==
- Rolan Bykov as Shishok
- Oksana Duben as Olya
- Evdokiya Alekseeva as Babushka (as Ye. Alekseyeva)
- Elena Sanaeva as Taisyia
- Aleksandr Potapov as Albert
- Vadim Zakharchenko as Prokhor (as V. Zakharchenko)
- Georgiy Millyar as mister Brauni (as G. Millyar)
- Vadim Aleksandrov as Professor (as V. Aleksandrov)
- Sergey Remizov as Yevgeny
