= Boris Buneev =

Russian film director (1921–2015)

Boris Buneyev
- Born: 11 August 1921; Moscow, Russian SFSR
- Died: 1 September 2015 (aged 94); Kamenka village, Firovsky District, Tver Oblast, Russia
- Occupations: Film and voice director, screenwriter
- Years active: 1944–1994

Boris Alekseyevich Buneyev (Russian: Борис Алексеевич Бунеев; 11 August 1921 – 1 September 2015) was a Soviet and Russian film and voice director. He was awarded the title of Honoured Worker of the Arts Industry of the RSFSR in 1973.

== Biography ==
Buneyev graduated from the directing department of VGIK in 1944, as part of Sergei Eisenstein's masterclass.

In 1944-1949, he was a director at Mosfilm, and then in 1949-1951 and 1952-2005, at the Gorky Film Studio. His first film was Glorious Path (1949).

== Selected filmography ==
- 1949 - Glorious Path
- 1951 - On the Steppe
- 1953 - Mysterious Discovery
- 1956 - For the Power of the Soviets
- 1959 - The Man from Planet Earth
- 1962 - The Ends of the Earth
- 1971 - A Small Farmstead in the Steppe
- 1974 - The Last Meeting
- 1976 - Duck Village. A Tale.
- 1979 - The Evil Spirit of Yambuy
- 1987 - Stronger Than All Other Commands
