= Eugen Doga =

Moldovan composer (1937–2025)

Eugen Doga OR PAU
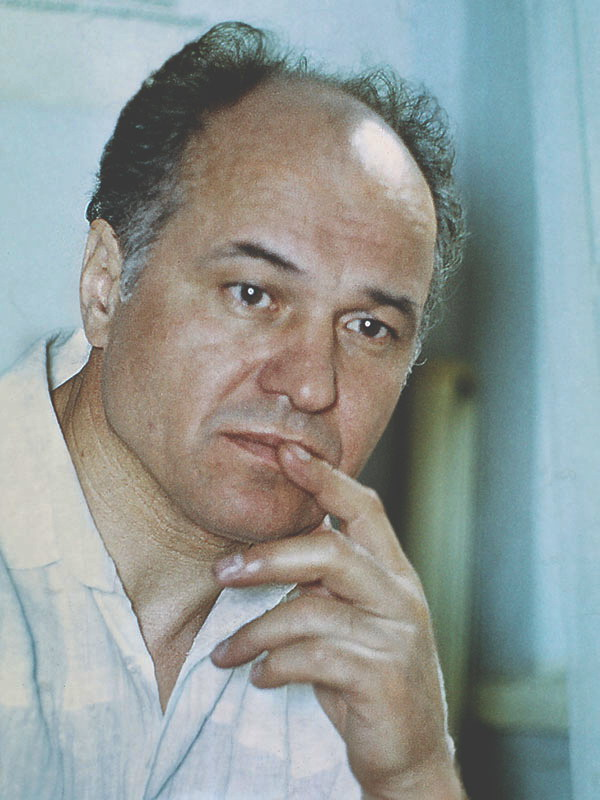
- Doga in the 1970s
- Born: 1 March 1937; Mocra, Moldavian ASSR, Ukrainian SSR, Soviet Union
- Died: 3 June 2025 (aged 88); Chișinău, Moldova
- Resting place: Chișinău Central Cemetery
- Education: Chișinău State Conservatory
- Occupations: Composer; conductor
- Notable work: A Hunting Accident (score)
- Political career

People's Deputy of the Soviet Union
- In office 26 March 1989 – 5 September 1991
- Constituency: Cimișlia

Member of the Supreme Soviet of the Moldavian SSR
- In office 1975–1989

Personal details
- Party: CPSU (until 1991)
- Website: dogamusic.com

Eugen Doga (1 March 1937 – 3 June 2025) was a Moldovan composer. He made significant contributions to various forms of music during his career.

Doga created ballets, Luceafărul, Venancia, and Queen Margot, the opera Dialogues of Love, more than 100 instrumental and choral works, symphonies, 6 quartets, Requiem and other church music. He also wrote incidental music for 13 plays, radio shows, more than 200 film scores, more than 260 songs and romances, more than 70 waltzes. He also composed works for children and the music for the opening and closing ceremonies of the 1980 Summer Olympic Games in Moscow.

The World Intellectual Property Organization (Geneva), in recognition of his outstanding achievements in music, awarded him a special certificate in 2007.

== Life and career ==
=== Early life and education ===
Doga was born on 1 March 1937 in the village of Mocra in the Rîbniţa District (then in Moldavian Autonomous Soviet Socialist Republic), in a Romanian family.

The childhood of the composer coincided with a period of historical cataclysms – the war, repressions, hunger, poverty, and exhausting hard work (the composer's memories of his childhood).

After finishing seven years at school, Doga with his friends went to Chișinău (barefoot and without money, as he recalled later) to enrol in the School of Music which he learned about when listening to a homemade radio. He was admitted to the music school, despite having no prior training. Thanks to his natural talent and hard work, Doga managed to quickly catch up, mastered musical notation, and learned to play cello. He always had the fondest memories of his cello teacher Pablo Giovanni Baccini, with whom his personal example greatly influenced the future destiny of the composer.

"My second teacher, an old man by the name of Pavel Ivanovich Bachinin, became my salvation. I always think of him with joy. He scheduled my first lesson at 6 o'clock in the morning. I came in – he was already sitting there playing the piano. I liked him a lot – intelligent, very musical, and tactful. He worked with me every morning from 6:00 to 8:30, before lectures, for two and a half years. He taught me not only to play the cello, but simply to be a decent human being. He never said the word 'must', never used the imperative mood. However, through his own example, his attitude, he had taught me a lot,"- said Doga.

In 1951–1955 he studied at the Music School in Chișinău, specializing in cello, and then at the Conservatory where one of his classmates was a future opera star Maria Bieșu. She made her debut with his song "White flower garden" (Floare dalbă din livadă) on the Moldovan television. Paralysis of the left hand prevented a career of a musician – this was due to the fact that he used to live in a basement. Doga studied for another 5 years at the Art Institute "Gavriil Musicescu", in the class of Professor S. Lobel specializing in composition. 1 January 1957 for the first time in his work, "New Year song" (Cântec de anul nou) was performed on the Moldovan radio children's choir and orchestra under the baton of Shiko Aranova. In 1963, he wrote his first string quartet.

After graduating from the Conservatory in Chişinău, he performed as cellist in the Orchestra of the State Committee of the Moldavian Soviet Socialist Republic for television and radio (1957–1962), taught at the Music College "Stefan Neaga" from Chișinău (1962–1967), and worked from 1967 to 1972 at the repertory-editorial Board of the Ministry of Culture of Moldova.

He made his compositional debut in 1963, with a string quartet.

=== Concert activity ===
From 1972 Doga om concert tours, travelled all over the territory of the former Soviet Union, as well to some foreign countries.

"The image of the person is defined by his deeds that ultimately benefit people and society. And the concerts that I give in Chișinău, Moscow, St. Petersburg, Kursk or Bucharest, are aimed at precisely this idea of bringing people together, preserving the ideals that make people kinder, more tolerant, that make flowers bloom, and the sun shine brighter,"- said Eugen Doga.

Doga's concerts took place in the biggest concert halls. They "gathered huge audiences", and they still do today. "...There were so many offenses because of Eugen Doga's concerts; people just did not want to talk to me. They told me: "I have been asking you for three years, and you can't arrange Eugen Doga's concert." And I really couldn't, because he was very busy. In Leningrad there was a concert orchestra conducted by Anatoly Badhen, a wonderful orchestra, unequalled in the Soviet Union, which played high-quality music. This orchestra for many years gave a lot of concerts with Eugen Doga's music everywhere, throughout the Soviet Union" – Mikhail Murzak. Philharmonic Director of Chișinău (1972–1988 years).

His music was performed by the Choir of TV and radio Moldova, the Russian state Symphony orchestra of cinematography, Academic Choir "Doina", The George Enescu Philharmonic Orchestra, the Moscow chamber orchestra "The seasons", Leningrad Concert Orchestra, Academic Grand choir "Masters of choral singing", Orchestra of the Moldavian Philharmonic "Sergei Lonkevich", Moscow city Symphony orchestra "Russian Philharmonic", The national Symphony orchestra of the public company "Teleradio-Moldova", the Presidential orchestra of the Republic of Moldova, Children's choir "Liya Ciocarlia", Large children's choir of the USSR Gosteleradio, Orchestra of the Romanian National Opera Iași, and other groups.

=== Public activities ===
Equally important for Doga during his whole life was his public work. From 1987 to 1991 he was a member of the Committee on Lenin and State Prizes of the USSR. For two convocations he was in the Supreme Soviet of Moldavia, for two more – in the Supreme Soviet of the USSR. He, alongside Timofei Moșneaga, were the only members of the Moldavian faction that penned an open letter to Soviet President Mikhail Gorbachev, condemning the separatist movement brewing in Transnistria at the time.

As of 2001 he was the permanent chairman of the jury of the All-Russian Movement "Gifted Children of Russia", chairman of the jury of the contest of family Theatre. From 1997 to 2002 he worked with preschool children in a house where he lived. Member of the International Academy of the Arts, Member of the academy of film art "NIKA", Full member of the Russian Academy of science and culture; Member of the International Academy of Arts and culture. Throughout the creative activities of Doga he conducted awareness-raising concerts, charity concerts, and lectured to students.

He was on numerous juries of various music and cinematic competitions and festivals across Russia and abroad: Festival "Spirit of fire", Kremlin Cadet ball, Berdyanskiy International Film Festival, Education International Festival in Iași (Festivalului Internaţional al Educaţiei), International Film Forum "Gold Knight", The all-Russian children's charity ball books heroes", and so on.

Doga declared that he supported the Unification of Moldova and Romania.

He was an Orthodox Christian, belonging to the Metropolis of Bessarabia.

Doga opposed the 2022 Russian invasion of Ukraine and called it a war, not a "special military operation".

He participated in the European Moldova National Assembly on 21 May 2023.

=== Family ===
"Family is the home port, which any ship is seeking for, wherever it is. Even despite long distances. Our, artists', distances are incommensurable, but I am glad to have my wife, daughter and grandson waiting for me". Eugen Doga

In 1962 Eugen Doga was married to a graduate of the Moscow technological Institute of Natalia. They had a daughter, Viorica (television director) and grandson, Dominic (student).

- Father – Dmitry Fedorovich Doga (1906–?).
- Mother – Elizabeth Nikiforovna Doga (1915–?).
- Wife – Natalia Pavlovna Doga (born 1939), engineer.
- Daughter – Viorica Doga (born 1966).
- Grandson – Dominique Doga

=== Later life ===
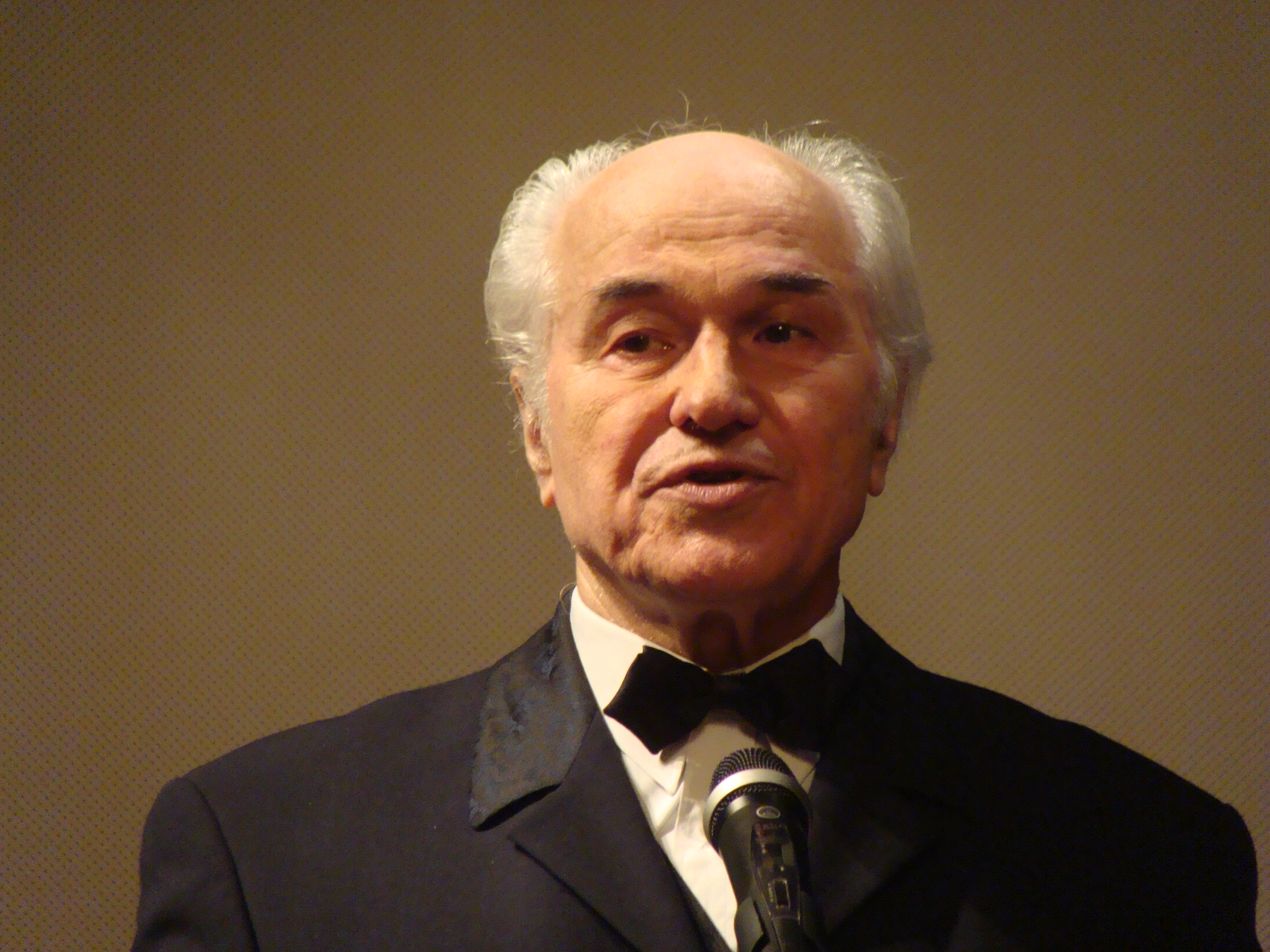
Eugen Doga in Vienna, December 2015

Eugen Doga lived with his family in Chișinău, as well as in Moscow. He continued to perform live, participating in various festivals.

In 2012, the anniversary concert in the Great Hall of the Moscow Conservatory, Concert Hall Ateneul Roman in Bucharest, at the National Palace in Chișinău, in 2013 – in Kazakhstan, 2014 – performances in Tomsk, Stavropol, in Iași, in the park Arts Titan in Bucharest and others. In 2014, his waltz "Gramophone" was performed in the hall Ateneum Roman at the annual awarding of the Romanian Academy for outstanding achievements in the field of culture, science and education, along with works by Mozart, Enescu, Strauss, and Borodin.

He continued with social activities – spent with like-minded charity concerts at Children's Hospital and the hospital, in Tiraspol, participated in festivals.

In 2012 Doga established the International Fund "Dominanta". The Fund is designed to facilitate the implementation of the composer's creative and spiritual principles – cooperation in the field of musical art, cinema.

The Eugen Doga Salon welcomed its first guests on 18 January 2014, fulfilling a vision of an intimate musical setting created to bridge modern social divides. By centering on shared cultural expression, the venue aims to cultivate community and dialogue through music.

The documentary film "Eugen Doga" took the big prize at the International Festival of Independent Film "HERCULES.ro" in Romania.

Doga died on 3 June 2025, at the age of 88.

== Creation ==
=== Film music ===
In 1967, Eugen Doga began writing music for cinema and it became a regular engagement for many years. "The first movie with my music came out in 1968, the last – in 2011. Cinema is a whole separate life, my most important and favorite genre. In cinema music I was able to express all of my stylistic aspirations; I got to work with great orchestras, musicians, and movie directors from around the world" – said Eugen Doga.

Eugen Doga's debut as a movie composer was in 1967 in the movie directed by George Voda "We need a gatekeeper for anime" based on the fairy-tale "Ivan Turbinca" by Ion Creanga – a fantastic story about amazing adventures of a soldier from the royal army, who was invited to serve as a guard of the gates to paradise.

He continued to write music for movies. From 1960s to 1970s he wrote music for almost half of the movies produced by the studio "Moldova-Film." There was a running joke in the studio that it should be renamed into "MolDoga Film".

=== Film music (with Emil Loteanu) ===
In 1970, Eugen Doga began his creative collaboration with director Emil Loteanu, starting with the movie "Lăutarii" (1973, 13, 8 million viewers)) about folk musicians of Moldova, whose music he used to listen to as a child. Eugen Doga grew up in a region where, according to him, there were "great folk traditions," where his maternal ancestors lived (the composer kept the book of the genealogic tree of his mother's family going back 300 years). Based on that folklore, he wrote the music for the movie which created a furore and brought the authors a Silver shell at the International Film Festival in San Sebastian.

After that a tight creative collaboration between the composer and the famous Moldovan director. In the end of 1971 on the poem by Gh. Vodă Doga wrote the song "My white city", which became a musical symbol of the capital of the republic, and which is performed hourly by the chimes at the turret of the City Hall of Chișinău. A future pop star Sofia Rotaru debuted with this song, and the song became one of the most popular around the whole of the former Soviet Union.

In 1976, already at Mosfilm, Eugen Doga together with Loteanu created the movie "Queen of the Gypsies"(1976, Soviet leader rolled in 1976, 65 million viewers, copies have been sold in 120 countries.) – a romantic legend about a dramatic love of two young and proud gypsies. This picture won the Grand Prix – the "Golden shell" at the International Film Festival in San Sebastian. In order to create the music for this movie, Eugen Doga studied gypsy folklore around the whole of the Soviet Union. In 1978, for a film adaptation of the novel by Anton Chekhov "Drama at the hunt," Loteanu again engaged Eugen Doga. The movie is called A Hunting Accident (1978, 26 million. viewers) A famous waltz from the movie became wildly popular; it has become a cult, many newlyweds use it for their first dance and you can often hear it on the radio and TV.

"I felt that popularity as well: I will never forget a huge line at the music store on the Garden Ring Road, where they were selling music records with soundtrack to the movie A Hunting Accident, recalls the composer. This waltz is now performed around the world. It was performed during the mass gymnastic composition (2000 athletes) at the opening of the Olympic Games in 1980; it was also used in the scene of the first ball of Natasha Postova at the opening ceremony of the 2014 Olympic Games in Sochi. Ronald Reagan called it "the waltz of the century" when he visited Moscow. Today this tune is performed every day not only in sounds, not only in the Marriage Registrations Hall, but also on the subway, and on the streets; it is often used by choreographers for staging ballet and dance routines, and by athletes. This waltz is considered the most well-known movie waltz.

Victoria Demici, a British-Romanian writer, is the author of the lyrics versions of the famous Waltz 'My Sweet and Tender Beast'. She wrote both the Romanian (2012) and the English (2022) lyrics for Doga's masterpiece. Paula Seling and Catalina Caraus sing the poetry versions of the Waltz.

Canadian ice-skater, Madeline Schizas, performed to the lyrics version of the Waltz during the 2022 Olympic Games in Beijing and made it to third place.

American ice-skater, Isabeau Levito, skated to the poetry version written by Eugen Doga and Victoria Demici during the 2023 U.S. Figure Skating Championships. The 15-year-old ice-skater won the Gold Medal accompanied by the so-called Waltz of the Champions.

=== Film music continued ===
"To his music in the Soviet cinema people kept silent, cried, got married, went to heaven" – the NTV channel

Eugen Doga found success not only in films by Loteanu. In 1982, at the International Film Festival in Giffoni (Italy) it won the first prize in the category of animated films. In the 1980s, 1990s, and 2000s Eugen Doga continued to write a lot of music for cinema. Music in movies not only enhances the emotional colouring of the action, but it continues to live for years after the movie is released, and is performed in concerts as well.

Dozens of movies shot in Moscow, St. Petersburg, Kyiv and other cities will have in their credits the name of Eugen Doga. In Palermo and in San Sebastian, in Bucharest and in Moscow jury always together with the talent of directors recognized the contribution by the composer – "rare, poetic music, and its full integration with the storyline." For music written for movies the composer was awarded a number of prizes and awards.

He composed music for many films, including Soviet productions Maria, Mirabela (1981) and My Sweet and Tender Beast (1978), which is known under its international title A Hunting Accident.

In 1983, Eugen Doga wrote the music for the famous movie by Loteanu "Anna Pavlova" about the legendary ballerina Anna Pavlova.

Doga's waltz from the film My Sweet and Tender Beast was used twice in the Olympic Games opening ceremonies: in the 1980 Summer Olympics in Moscow and in the 2014 Winter Olympic Games in Sochi where it was performed in the famous scene in Tolstoy's War and Peace of Natasha's first formal Ball in St. Petersburg. In the latter case, the waltz was performed in an unauthorized arrangement. The composer expressed his outrage in his Facebook post where he wrote: " I lost my face with this "arrangement" ".

The other Doga's celebrated waltz is Gramophone (Граммофон), composed in 1992, for the unsuccessful Belarusian crime film Without Evidence (Без улик).

=== Academic music ===
Eugen Doga wrote music in academic genres throughout his career. These included large scale forms, romance songs. His creative talent was characterized by free use of different genres and styles.

He wrote a symphony (1969), ballets "Luceafărul" (1983) and "Venancia" (1989), the opera "Dialogues of Love" (2014), six string quartets, cantatas "White Rainbow" (verses E.Loteanu), "Spring of mankind" (verses A. Strimbeanu), "The Human Voice" (lyrics by R. Rozhdestvensky), "The Heart of the Century" (verses I. Podilians), several cantatas with soloists, chorus and Symphony Orchestra, including the cantata for children's performance ("Lia-ciocarlia", "Bună dimineața" (Good morning), "Vine-vine primăvara" (goes, comes spring), two requiem (1969 – without a word, 1994 at the poems by Pushkin), two symphonic overtures, requiem, 10 choirs and capella verses E. Beech two choruses and capella verses M. Eminescu, 70 waltzes, as well as many pieces for violin, cello, flute, accordion, piano.

In the first round of creative interests include M. Eminescu, V. Micle, G. Vieru. Of Russian classics: Poets of the Silver Age, the names V. Bryusov, K. Balmont, Marina Tsvetaeva, A. Koltsov, S. Yesenin, Vl. Lazarev, A. Dementiev and others.

=== Ballets ===
In the early 1970s, Eugen Doga began writing a ballet based on the poem Luceafărul – the greatest work by the classic of Romanian literature Mihai Eminescu. However, he was only able to continue after a long period of time.

"Only ten years later Luceafărul relented and graced my music sheets, creating a world that drew me in so strongly, drew me in so much that I felt like in a short period of time I had lived a whole eternity," – said the composer. In 1983 the ballet was written in 2 1/2 months – 500 pages of a complicated musical score. The ballet "Luceafărul" premiered on 6 June 1983, at the National Theatre of Opera and Ballet and it was performed on that stage for several years. In 1984 for the ballet "Luceafărul" Eugen Doga was awarded the State Prize of the USSR. The ballet was also performed in Moscow at the Bolshoi Theater, at the Kremlin Palace of Congresses, and was filmed by the Leningrad TV. Several performances took place in St. Petersburg, Minsk, Kyiv and Odesa. It was staged for the second time in 2007 at the National Opera and Ballet Theatre of Moldova. It was also presented to the public in the open air in front of the Central cathedral in the park in Chișinău in 2009. The music from the ballet was often performed in various concerts – in Ateneu Roman in 2007, in 2012 in Bucharest, in the Tchaikovsky Hall in Moscow in 2012.

This ballet has become one of the pinnacles of the composer's creative career.

A fantastic storyline of a fairy tale by Eminescu was first expressed in the language of music. A dream of love, a collapse of romantic illusions, cosmic infinity of the stellar world and earthly reality are all outlined with completed musical images in continuous symphonic development using the combination of traditional techniques of Western European and Russian theatre classics and national character of musical images.

"For example, where did the musical images in my ballet come from? They come from somewhere in the Carpathians and even further out,"- said Eugen Doga.

And images of his next ballet "Venancia" came from the other hemisphere. Eugen Doga visited Nicaragua, Argentina, Honduras, Brazil where he studied unique folklore of Latin American countries and collected material for a ballet. The music of these countries combines the origins of the European music with the ancient folklore of the Indians. It presents an incredible diversity of styles, sophisticated rhythms and melodies. Due to the collapse of the Soviet Union, the ballet was not staged. The storyline of the ballet – romance, love, fight for freedom. The premiere of a concert version of the ballet took place in 2007 in Chișinău (Moldova) performed by the orchestra, chorus and soloists of the Moldavian Philharmonic. In 2008, the music to the ballet was performed in Bucharest, and in 2012 – in the Great Hall of the Moscow Conservatoire.

=== Opera "Dialogues of Love" ===
In 1972 Eugen Doga for the first time wrote two works for chorus on the poems by a genius of Romanian literature Mihai Eminescu.

In the creative work of Eugen Doga, the poetry by Mihai Eminescu and his lover, poet Veronica Micle occupied a very important place. In 1983 he created ballet based on a fantastic story of the poem by Mihai Eminescu.

In 1996 the composer was presented with a collection of poems "Dor nemângâiat" by Veronica Micle. Eugen Doga wrote more than 40 romance songs on poems of Mihai Eminescu and Veronica Micle. Since he got so inspired by the dramatic love story of these two poets, he wrote an opera about it (first aria written for the opera "Do not cry" Nu plânge. Lyric by Veronica Micle).

=== Music for stage plays and radio plays ===
Eugen Doga wrote music also for animated films, for a series of films from multi-episode TV show for the Central TV channel This Fantastical World. The work was based on materials of Russian and Western science fiction writers. The characters participated in adventures to distant planets, and the composer was supposed to create music that would transport the viewers to those imaginary distant worlds.

Songs were used for the verses R. Bradbury, N. Hikmet, А. Tolstoy, M. Voloshin. Leading gear was pilot-cosmonaut Georgy Grechko.

== Honours ==
Chișinău's main pedestrianised thoroughfare has been named Eugen Doga Street in his honour. The year 2017, when the composer celebrated his 80th anniversary, was declared the Year of Eugen Doga in Moldova. A month after his death, the Chișinău International Airport was named after Eugen Doga.

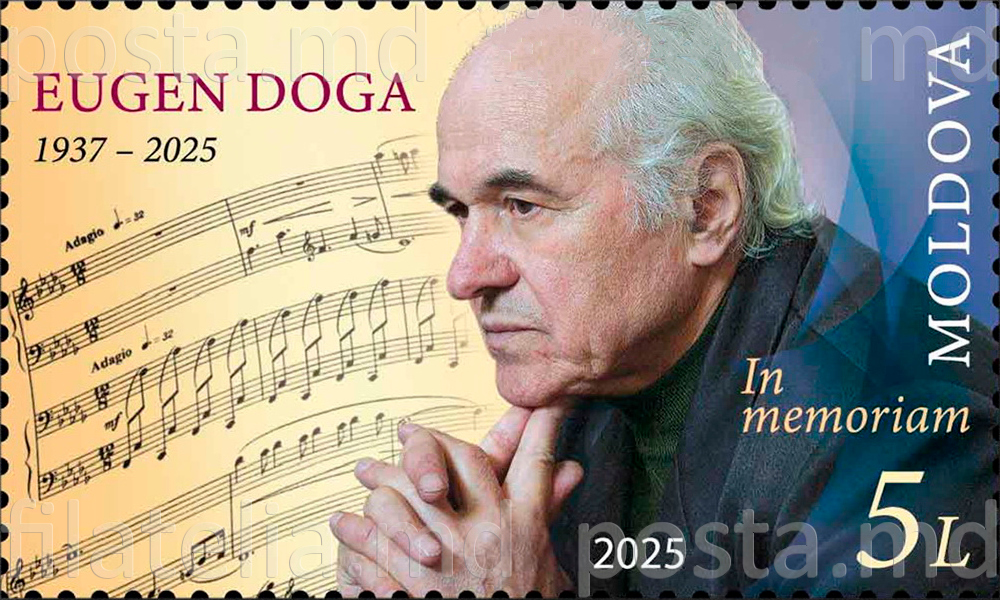
Doga on a 2025 stamp of Moldova

=== Moldovan ===
- Order "For Services to the Fatherland", IV grade (10 January 2008)
- Member of Academy of Sciences of Moldova (1992)
- Order of the Republic (1997, 2007)
- Honorary Citizen of Chișinău
- Laureate of the State Prize of the Republic of Moldova – 2008.

=== Soviet ===
- Member of the Union of Composers of Moldova (1961) and the USSR (1974)
- Member of the Union of Cinematographers of the USSR (1975)
- Honoured Artist of the Moldavian SSR (1974)
- Laureate of the State Prize of the Moldavian SSR (1980)
- People's Artist of Moldova (1984)
- Laureate of the USSR State Prize (1984)
- People's Artist of the USSR (1987).

=== Other ===
- Officer of the Order of the Star of Romania (2000).
- Recipient of the gold medal "Person-2000" (USA).
- Recipient of the jubilee medal and a diploma in honour of the 150th birth anniversary of Mihai Eminescu "For prominent contribution to the propaganda of the poet's creative work" (2000).
- Recipient of the "Ovation" prize (2001), "Ovation" (2007).
- Order of the Star of Romania (2000, 2004)
- Beanie Master International festival of arts "Master Class" (2004).
- Order of Danaker (Kyrgyzstan) (2007).
- Award "Commonwealth" (2007).
- Award "Beacons Of The Motherland" (2007).
- The order of the Ruby cross "Sacred power" (2007).
- A music school was named after him "Eugen Doga".
- In Moldova, the year 2007 (when the composer celebrated his 70th birthday) was declared the Year of Eugen Doga.
- The World Intellectual Property Organization (Geneva) in recognition of his outstanding achievements in music awarded him with a special certificate.
- Order "For the good of the Fatherland", Russia, 2008.
- Eugen Doga was awarded the "Order of Faithful Service" of Romania, 2014.
- The minor planet 10504 Doga (1987 UF_{5}), discovered by Lyudmila Zhuravlyova was named after Eugen Doga.
- The "Golden Knight" prize for the music for "Ash Waltz" motion picture (2011)

== Books and films about Eugen Doga ==
Books

- "Eugen Doga" – Efim Weaver. Chișinău, 1980 (on the mold. askalice)
- "In the constellation of talent" Efim Weaver. (about the composer; ibid., 1979, No. 4)
- "The world of sounds Eugen Doga" Efim Weaver. (Aurora, RAF, 1979, No. 15)
- "In the mirror moments". Elena Shatokhina. Publishing house "Timpul" (1989 Gros.)
- Eugen Doga: Compozitor, academician /Acad. de Şt. a Moldovei; coord. : GheorgheDuca. – Ch. : Î.E.P. "Ştiinţa". – (Col."Academica").Vol. 3. – 2007.
- "Eugen doga – familiar and unknown." E. Kleinich. Isdataat. Composer, 1999. – 227 C. Are photos from the family archive of E. Doga.
- "Do În major / Eugen Doga"; Larisa Turea, ABC Centrală. graf.: V. Cutureanu, D. Mazepa. – Ch.: [s.n.], 2007. – 63 p.
- "Non-musical fields or Vortex spiral of time". This book contains autobiographical notes, his essays, interviews, correspondence with fans, friends, neighbours and relatives. Publisher: Favorite Russia, 2008
- "Meditație pe portativ", Victor Crăciun, Eugen Doga, Bucureşti.
- "Eugen DOGA: Muzica este prima și ultima mea iubire" Luminiţa Dumbrăveanu, (editura Prut International, 296 pagini, Chişinău). 7 mai 2013.(Romanian) "Eugen Doga: Music is my first and last love".

Movies

- Eugen Doga. Emil Loteanu, 1983 (Russian)
- Poets Of Europe. Yuri Vondrak, 2000. (Russian)
- St. Petersburg vacation. 2007. (Russian)
- Eterna. TeleRadio Moldova. 2007. (Romanian)
- White city. ITRC "Mir", 2010. (Russian)
- The score of my life. Viorica Doga. 2012. (Romanian)
- Filmul "Eugen Doga". Serialul de filme documentare / enciclopedice "100 romani celebri nascuti in Moldova". Studioul "Flacăra Film", Luminiţa Dumbrăveanu mai, 2013. (Romanian, English subtitles)
