= Aleksandr Sery =

- Born: Aleksandr Ivanovich Sery; 27 October 1927; Ramon, Soviet Union
- Died: 16 October 1987 (aged 59); Moscow, Soviet Union
- Occupation: Film director
- Years active: 1963–1982
- Notable work: Gentlemen of Fortune (1971)

Aleksandr Ivanovich Sery (Russian: Александр Иванович Серый; 27 October 1927 – 16 October 1987) was a Soviet and Russian film director, known for directing the 1971 comedy film Gentlemen of Fortune.

Upon directing Gentlemen of Fortune, Sery had just come out of prison. Georgiy Daneliya assisted him and wrote the script. Sery used his prison experience to design many situations in the movie, and he also introduced numerous expressions from Russian criminal slang (known as fenya). During filming, it was discovered that he was ill with leukemia, which grew worse and worse during his life.

On 16 October 1987, eleven days before his 60th birthday, he committed suicide by a gunshot.
