= Emil Loteanu =

Moldovan and Soviet film director

Emil Loteanu OR
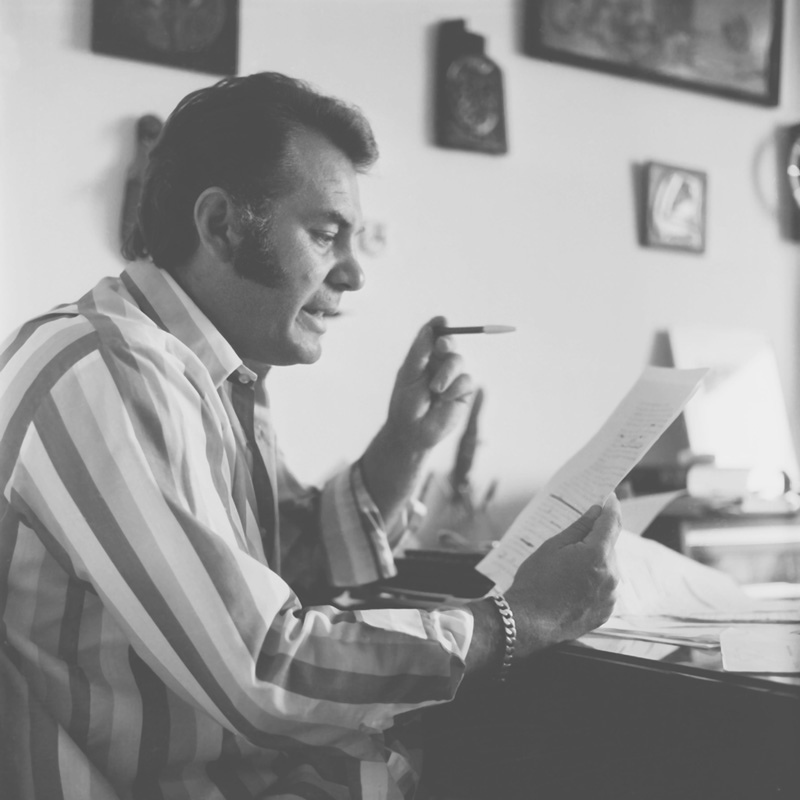
- Loteanu in 1972
- Born: 6 November 1936; Clocuşna, Kingdom of Romania
- Died: 18 April 2003 (aged 66); Moscow, Russia
- Resting place: Vagankovo Cemetery, Moscow
- Citizenship: Romania; Russia; Moldova
- Occupations: Director, screenwriter, poet
- Years active: 1959–1997
- Notable work: Gypsies Are Found Near Heaven (1975)
- Spouse: Galina Belyayeva (m. 1979; div. 1984)
- Children: 1

Emil Loteanu (6 November 1936 – 18 April 2003) was a Moldovan and Soviet film director born in what is now Republic of Moldova. He moved to Bucharest and Moscow in his early life. His best known films are Lăutarii, Gypsies Are Found Near Heaven, A Hunting Accident and Anna Pavlova.

== Life and career ==
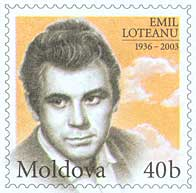
2004 Moldovan stamp

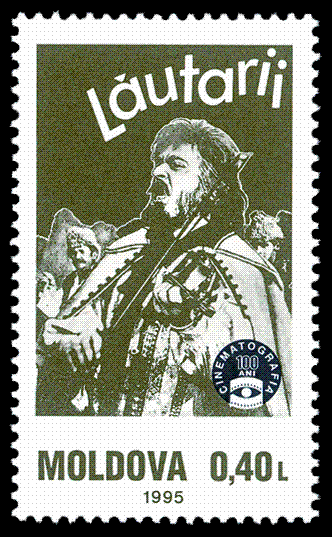
1995 Moldovan stamp

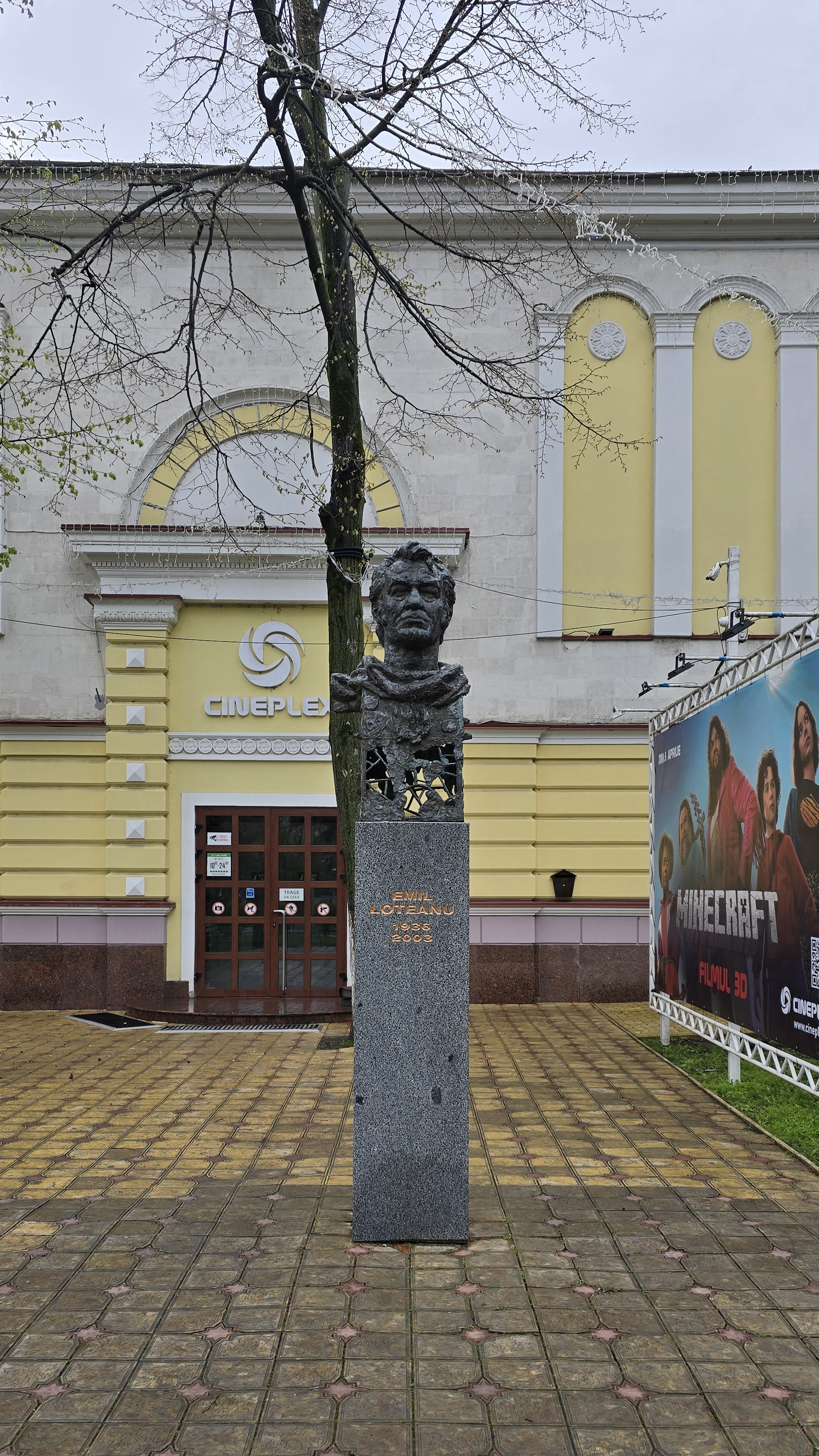
Bust in Chișinău

Emil Vladimirovich Loteanu was born on 6 November 1936 in the Bessarabian village Clocuşna (now Ocniţa District, Moldova); at the time, the area was part of Greater Romania.

His paternal ancestors were from Bukovina. After the annexation of Bessarabia to the Soviet Union, they moved to Bucharest. After the death of his father and losing contact with his mother, who had moved to Romania, he lived his early life on the streets, sleeping in warehouses and hostels. Between 1953 and 1955, he studied at the actor's faculty of the Moscow Art Theatre. In 1962, he graduated from VGIK (workshop of Grigori Roshal and Y. Genik).

Between 1952 and 1954, he worked as an actor at the Moscow Pushkin Drama Theatre. From 1962 to 1973, he worked as a director at the studio Moldova-Film where he made his narrative feature film debut with the heroic and revolutionary film Wait for us at dawn (1963). In 1966, Loteanu directed a motion picture about the Moldavian shepherds titled Red Meadows. He was a member of the Communist Party of the Soviet Union since the year 1968. In his cinematic poem Lăutarii (1971), the director depicted the life of folk musicians. The film's music was scored by Eugene Doga and was the beginning for their long collaboration. The film won the Silver Shell at the San Sebastián International Film Festival.

Since 1973, Loteanu worked at the studio Mosfilm. Film adaptations of Maxim Gorky's Gypsies Are Found Near Heaven and Anton Chekhov's A Hunting Accident, and the biographical film Anna Pavlova, dedicated to the life of the great Russian ballerina, brought him great popularity. In 1976, the film Gypsies Are Found Near Heaven won the Grand Prix – the "Golden Shell" – at the International Film Festival in San Sebastian. A waltz by Eugene Doga from the 1978 film A Hunting Accident became world-famous.

One of the producers of his 1983 film Anna Pavlova was Michael Powell. The film was a co-production between Britain and the Soviet Union and featured American director Martin Scorsese in a cameo role.

In 1979, Loteanu married actress Galina Belyayeva, who starred in his films A Hunting Accident and Anna Pavlova. Their marriage was a stormy one and lasted five years. They had one child.

In the late 1980s, he returned to "Moldova-Film" and worked on Moldovan television, where he made a film adaption of Mihai Eminescu's poem Luceafărul. Between 1987 and 1992, he was President of the Union of Cinematographers of Moldova. He taught courses for theater actors at the Chisinau Institute of Arts.

In 1998, he staged the play Unconditionally Yours, Antosha Chekhonte based on Chekhov's "The Bear" and "Wedding" at the Moscow Art Theatre named after M. Gorky. He is an author of several collections of poems and short stories, scripts of his films. He is also an author of poetry for the film The Eighth Wonder of the World (1981).

For twelve years, he was trying to get funding to make films. In the 1990s, he was received by the Romanian President Ion Iliescu, to whom he proposed funding to make, together with other filmmakers and actors from Romania and Moldova, more films about the history of Romanians. When Loteanu at long last got financing for his film project Yar he died, leaving the project unfinished. He died from cancer on 18 April 2003 in Moscow, at the age of 66. Galina Belyayeva and his doctors hid the diagnosis from him. He was buried at the Vagankovsky cemetery in Moscow.

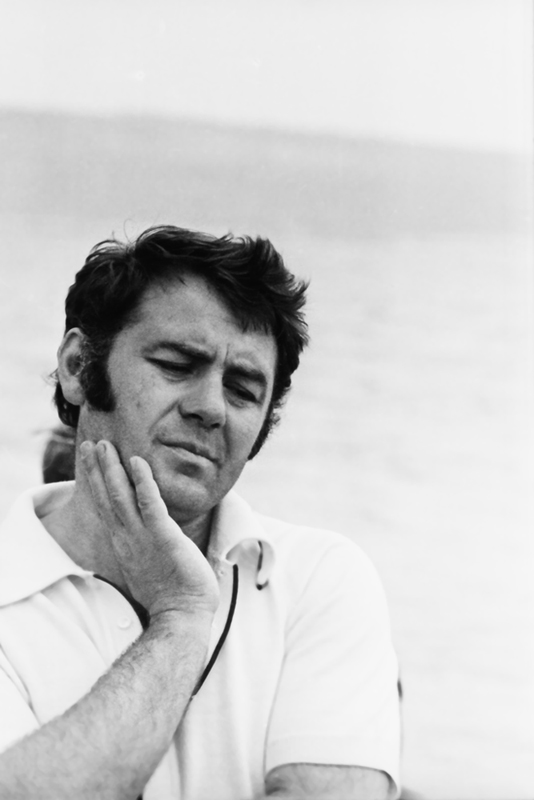
Director Emil Loteanu while working on the film Lautarii, Moldova-film.

== Quotes ==
Today's prize is added to several other awards of my life, at 19 I was at Arghezi's house and I took a letter of the poet for the Basarabian writers; I saw Sadoveanu at a lecture on the historical novel, standing next to Labiș; over the years I was with fellow Romanian guilders at great film festivals. I feel like a Romanian artist, even though I worked at Mosfilm, I live in Moscow and I run the El Condor Film House there. The artist in me has always considered himself an interpreter of a historical situation, an interpreter who supported his score with great enthusiasm, as a friend, as a brother of Romania.

— Emil Loteanu in 2001, after he received the prize of the Romanian Cultural Foundation

== Filmography ==
- Bolshaya gora (1959) – director
- Zhil-byl malchik (1960) a.k.a. There Was a Young Boy – director
- Zhdite nas na rassvete (1963) a.k.a. Wait for Us at Dawn – director
- Krasnye polyany (1966) – writer/director
- Freska na belom (1967) – director
- Eto mgnovenie (1968) – director
- Akademik Tarasevich (1970) – director
- Lăutarii (1971) a.k.a. Fiddlers – writer/director
- Ekho goryachey doliny (1974) a.k.a. Their Torrid Valleys – director
- Tabor ukhodit v nebo (1975) a.k.a. Queen of the Gypsies – writer/director
- Moy laskovyy i nezhnyy zver (1978) a.k.a. A Hunting Accident – writer/director
- Anna Pavlova (1983) a.k.a. A Woman for All Time – writer/director, actor (the manager of cabaret)
- Luceafărul (1987) a.k.a. The Morning Star – writer/director
- Vdvoyom na grani vremeni (1989) – writer
- Skorlupa (1993) a.k.a. The Shell – director

== See also ==
- Moldova-Film
- Mosfilm
