= 1951 in film =

The following events in film occurred in the year 1951.

== Top-grossing films ==
=== United States ===
The top ten 1951 released films by box office gross in the United States are as follows:

Highest-grossing films of 1951
Rank	Title	Distributor	Domestic rentals
1	Quo Vadis	MGM	$11,143,000
2	Show Boat	MGM	$5,293,000
3	David and Bathsheba	20th Century Fox	$4,720,000
4	The Great Caruso	MGM	$4,309,000
5	A Streetcar Named Desire	Warner Bros.	$4,250,000
6	The African Queen	United Artists	$4,100,000
7	That's My Boy	Paramount	$3,800,000
8	An American in Paris	MGM	$3,750,000
9	A Place in the Sun	Paramount	$3,500,000
10	At War with the Army	Paramount	$3,300,000

=== International ===
The highest-grossing 1951 films in countries outside of North America.

Country	Title	Studio	Gross	Ref
France	Samson and Delilah	Paramount Pictures	7,116,442 admissions	
India	Awaara	R. K. Films	$4,830,000	(Note: ₹23 million ($4.83 million) (Note: 4.7619 Indian rupees per US dollar from 1950 to 1965))
Italy	Anna	Lux Film	8,965,624 admissions	
Japan	The Tale of Genji	Daiei Kyoto	¥141,050,000	
Soviet Union	In Peaceful Time	Dovzhenko Film Studios	$1,470,000	(Note: 5.875 million Rbls (23.5 million Soviet tickets sold, average ticket price of 25 kopecks), 4 SUR per USD (Note: 4 Rbls per US dollar from 1950 to 1960))
United Kingdom	The Great Caruso	Metro-Goldwyn-Mayer	12,400,000 admissions	

== Worldwide gross ==
The following table lists known worldwide gross figures for several high-grossing films that originally released in 1951. Note that this list is incomplete and is therefore not representative of the highest-grossing films worldwide in 1951. This list also includes gross revenue from later re-releases.

Title	Worldwide gross	Country	Ref
Awaara	$30,660,000	India	(Note: Awaara: India – $4.83 million; Soviet Union – 37.75 million руб ($16.97 million); Initial run – 29 million руб ($7.25 million); Re-runs – 8.75 million руб (Note: 35 million re-run admissions up until 1964-1966, average Soviet ticket price of 25 kopecks) ($9.72 million) (Note: 0.9 SUR per US$ from 1961 to 1971); China – CN¥14.8 million ($8.86 million); Initial release – CN¥2.8 million ($1.14 million); Re-release – CN¥12 million ($7.72) million)
Quo Vadis	$30,028,513	United States	

== Events ==
- February 15 – new management takes over at United Artists with Arthur B. Krim, Robert Benjamin and Matty Fox now in charge.
- April – French magazine Cahiers du cinéma is first published.
- July 26 – Walt Disney's Alice in Wonderland premieres; while a disappointment at first and hardly released in theaters, it would later become one of the biggest cult classics in the animation medium as well as make millions in television viewings and subsequent releases on home video.
- September 10 – Rashomon wins the Golden Lion at the Venice Film Festival, bringing worldwide attention to Japanese film.
- September – The House Un-American Activities Committee investigation into Communism in the film industry starts to wind up after four years. They report in February 1952 that Hollywood has not done enough against Communist employees and hearings and blacklisting continues.
- December 14 – Raj Kapoor's first blockbuster movie, Awaara is released in India.
- December 29 – The Wilhelm scream, one of the most frequently-used stock sound effects, makes its first use in the film Distant Drums. The scream would not get its name until The Charge at Feather River in 1953.

== Awards ==
Category/Organization	9th Golden Globe Awards February 21, 1952		24th Academy Awards March 20, 1952
Category/Organization	Drama	Comedy or Musical	24th Academy Awards March 20, 1952
Best Film	A Place in the Sun	An American in Paris	
Best Director	László Benedek; Death of a Salesman		George Stevens; A Place in the Sun
Best Actor	Fredric March; Death of a Salesman	Danny Kaye; On the Riviera	Humphrey Bogart; The African Queen
Best Actress	Jane Wyman; The Blue Veil	June Allyson; Too Young to Kiss	Vivien Leigh; A Streetcar Named Desire
Best Supporting Actor	Peter Ustinov; Quo Vadis		Karl Malden; A Streetcar Named Desire
Best Supporting Actress	Kim Hunter; A Streetcar Named Desire		
Best Screenplay, Adapted	Robert Buckner; Bright Victory		Michael Wilson and Harry Brown; A Place in the Sun
Best Screenplay, Original	Robert Buckner; Bright Victory		Alan Jay Lerner; An American in Paris

== Top ten money making stars ==
The Top Ten Money Making Stars Poll was published by Quigley Publishing Company based on a poll of U.S. movie theater owners who were asked to name who they felt were the previous year's top 10 moneymaking stars.

Rank	Actor/Actress
1.	John Wayne
2.	Dean Martin and Jerry Lewis
3.	Betty Grable
4.	Bud Abbott and Lou Costello
5.	Bing Crosby
6.	Bob Hope
7.	Randolph Scott
8.	Gary Cooper
9.	Doris Day
10.	Spencer Tracy

They also published a Western stars poll which Roy Rogers topped for the ninth year running.

Rank	Actor/Actress
1.	Roy Rogers
2.	Gene Autry
3.	Tim Holt
4.	Charles Starrett
5.	Rex Allen
6.	Wild Bill Elliott
7.	Smiley Burnette
8.	Allan Lane
9.	Dale Evans
10.	Gabby Hayes

== Notable films released in 1951 ==
United States release unless stated

=== # ===
- The 13th Letter, directed by Otto Preminger, starring Linda Darnell and Charles Boyer

=== A ===
- Abbott and Costello Meet the Invisible Man, starring Bud Abbott and Lou Costello
- Ace in the Hole (a.k.a. The Big Carnival), directed by Billy Wilder, starring Kirk Douglas and Jan Sterling
- Across the Wide Missouri, starring Clark Gable
- The African Queen, directed by John Huston, starring Humphrey Bogart (Oscar for best actor) and Katharine Hepburn – (GB/US)
- Air Cadet, starring Gail Russell and Stephen McNally
- Alice in Wonderland, an animated film by Walt Disney
- Along the Great Divide, starring Kirk Douglas
- An American in Paris, directed by Vincente Minnelli, starring Gene Kelly and Leslie Caron (Oscar for best picture)
- Angels in the Outfield, starring Paul Douglas and Janet Leigh
- Anna, starring Silvana Mangano, Raf Vallone and Vittorio Gassman – (Italy)
- Another Man's Poison, directed by Irving Rapper, starring Bette Davis, Gary Merrill, Emlyn Williams and Anthony Steel – (GB)
- Apache Drums, starring Stephen McNally and Coleen Gray
- Appointment with Danger, starring Alan Ladd, with future Dragnet (series) co-stars Jack Webb and Harry Morgan
- Appointment with Venus, starring Glynis Johns and David Niven – (U.K.)
- As Young as You Feel, starring Monty Woolley
- Atoll K, starring Laurel and Hardy in their final film
- Awaara (Tramp), directed by and starring Raj Kapoor – (India)
- The Axe of Wandsbek (Das Beil von Wandsbek) – (East Germany)

=== B ===
- Badal (Cloud), starring Madhubala and Prem Nath – (India)
- Baazi (Gamble), starring Dev Anand – (India)
- Bedtime for Bonzo, starring Ronald Reagan (with a chimpanzee)
- Bellissima, directed by Luchino Visconti, starring Anna Magnani – (Italy)
- Blackmailed, starring Mai Zetterling and Dirk Bogarde – (GB)
- The Blue Veil, starring Jane Wyman
- Bright Victory, starring Arthur Kennedy
- The Browning Version, directed by Anthony Asquith, starring Michael Redgrave and Jean Kent – (GB)
- Bullfighter and the Lady, starring Robert Stack and Joy Page

=== C ===
- Callaway Went Thataway, starring Fred MacMurray, Dorothy McGuire, Howard Keel
- Call Me Mister, starring Betty Grable
- Captain Horatio Hornblower, starring Gregory Peck – (GB)
- Cattle Drive, starring Joel McCrea, Dean Stockwell and Chill Wills
- Cause for Alarm!, starring Loretta Young and Barry Sullivan
- China Corsair, starring Jon Hall
- Circle of Danger, starring Ray Milland – (GB)
- The Clouded Yellow, starring Trevor Howard and Jean Simmons – (GB)
- Come Fill the Cup, starring James Cagney and Gig Young
- Comin' Round The Mountain, starring Abbott and Costello
- Cops and Robbers (Guardie e ladri), directed by Mario Monicelli – (Italy)
- Cry Danger, starring Dick Powell and Rhonda Fleming
- Cry, the Beloved Country, directed by Zoltan Korda, starring Sidney Poitier – (GB)

=== D ===
- Darling, How Could You!, starring Joan Fontaine
- Daughter of Deceit (La hija del engaño), directed by Luis Buñuel – (Mexico)
- David and Bathsheba, starring Gregory Peck and Susan Hayward
- The Day the Earth Stood Still, directed by Robert Wise, starring Michael Rennie and Patricia Neal
- Death of a Salesman, starring Fredric March
- Deburau, directed by Sacha Guitry – (France)
- Decision Before Dawn, starring Richard Basehart, Gary Merrill and Oskar Werner
- Deedar, starring Ashok Kumar, Dilip Kumar, Nargis – (India)
- The Desert Fox: The Story of Rommel, starring James Mason
- Detective Story, starring Kirk Douglas, Eleanor Parker, William Bendix, Lee Grant, Horace McMahon, and George Macready
- Diary of a Country Priest (Journal d'un curé de campagne), directed by Robert Bresson – (France)
- Distant Drums, directed by Raoul Walsh, starring Gary Cooper
- Double Dynamite, starring Jane Russell, Frank Sinatra and Groucho Marx
- Dream of a Cossack (Kavalier zolotoy zvezdy), starring Sergei Bondarchuk – (U.S.S.R.)
- Daar Doer in Die Bosveld (Far Away in the Bushveld), starring Jamie Uys – (South Africa)

=== E ===
- Early Summer (Bakushū), directed by Yasujirō Ozu – (Japan)
- Encore, starring Nigel Patrick and Kay Walsh – (GB)
- The Enforcer (Murder, Inc.), starring Humphrey Bogart and Zero Mostel

=== F ===
- FBI Girl, starring Audrey Totter and Cesar Romero
- The Family Secret, starring John Derek and Lee J. Cobb
- Father's Little Dividend, starring Spencer Tracy and Elizabeth Taylor
- The Fighting Seventh (a.k.a. Little Big Horn), starring Lloyd Bridges
- Flying Leathernecks, starring John Wayne and Robert Ryan
- Follow the Sun, starring Glenn Ford (as Ben Hogan)
- The Forbidden Christ (Il Cristo proibito), starring Raf Vallone – (Italy)
- Fort Worth, starring Randolph Scott
- Four in a Jeep (Die Vier im Jeep), starring Ralph Meeker and Viveca Lindfors – (Switzerland)
- Fourteen Hours, starring Paul Douglas, Richard Basehart, Jeffrey Hunter and Grace Kelly
- The Frogmen, starring Richard Widmark and Dana Andrews
- Furrows (Surcos) – (Spain)

=== G ===
- Go for Broke!, starring Van Johnson
- Golden Girl, starring Mitzi Gaynor, Dale Robertson, Dennis Day
- The Golden Horde, starring Ann Blyth
- Goodbye My Fancy, starring Joan Crawford and Robert Young
- The Great Caruso, starring Mario Lanza
- The Great Missouri Raid, starring Wendell Corey
- The Groom Wore Spurs, starring Ginger Rogers
- Grounds for Marriage, starring Kathryn Grayson and Van Johnson
- The Guy Who Came Back, starring Paul Douglas

=== H ===
- Half Angel, starring Loretta Young
- Happy Go Lovely, starring David Niven and Vera-Ellen – (GB)
- He Ran All the Way, starring John Garfield and Shelley Winters
- Here Comes the Groom, directed by Frank Capra, starring Bing Crosby
- His Kind of Woman, starring Robert Mitchum, Jane Russell, Vincent Price and Raymond Burr
- Hollywood Story, starring Richard Conte and Julie Adams
- The House in Montevideo (Das Haus in Montevideo) – (West Germany)
- The House on Telegraph Hill, starring Richard Basehart

=== I ===
- I Can Get It for You Wholesale, starring Susan Hayward
- I'll Never Forget You
- I'll See You in My Dreams
- I Want You, directed by Mark Robson, starring Dana Andrews
- The Idiot (Hakuchi), directed by Akira Kurosawa – (Japan)
- Inside the Walls of Folsom Prison, starring Steve Cochran

=== J ===
- Jim Thorpe – All-American, starring Burt Lancaster
- Journey Into Light, directed by Stuart Heisler, starring Sterling Hayden
- Juliette, or Key of Dreams (Juliette ou La clef des songes), directed by Marcel Carné – (France)

=== K ===
- Kind Lady, directed by John Sturges, starring Ethel Barrymore, Maurice Evans, Keenan Wynn, Angela Lansbury
- Kon-Tiki, a documentary directed by and starring Thor Heyerdahl – (Norway)

=== L ===
- The Last Outpost, starring Ronald Reagan
- Laughter in Paradise, starring Alastair Sim – (GB)
- The Lavender Hill Mob, directed by Charles Crichton, starring Alec Guinness, Stanley Holloway, Sid James and Alfie Bass, with an early appearance by Audrey Hepburn – (GB)
- The Lemon Drop Kid, starring Bob Hope, Marilyn Maxwell, William Frawley and Tor Johnson
- Let's Go Crazy, starring Spike Milligan and Peter Sellers – (GB)
- Leva på 'Hoppet', starring Ingrid Thulin – (Sweden)
- Lightning Strikes Twice, starring Ruth Roman and Mercedes McCambridge
- Little Egypt, starring Rhonda Fleming and Mark Stevens
- The Long Dark Hall, starring Rex Harrison – (GB)
- Lost Continent, starring Cesar Romero
- Love Nest, starring June Haver and Marilyn Monroe
- Lullaby of Broadway

=== M ===
- The Magic Box, starring Robert Donat, a biopic of William Friese-Greene – (GB)
- The Man with a Cloak, starring Joseph Cotten
- Malliswari, starring N.T. Rama Rao – (India)
- The Man in the White Suit, directed by Alexander Mackendrick, starring Alec Guinness, Joan Greenwood, Cecil Parker, Michael Gough and Ernest Thesiger – (GB)
- The Man With the Twisted Lip (British TV movie) a Sherlock Holmes mystery directed by Richard M. Grey, starring John Longden as Sherlock Holmes and Campbell Singer as Watson
- The Mating Season, starring Gene Tierney, John Lund, Miriam Hopkins and Thelma Ritter
- The Medium, starring Marie Powers – (Italy)
- Miracle in Milan (Miracolo a Milano), directed by Vittorio De Sica – (Italy)
- Miss Julie (Fröken Julie), directed by Alf Sjöberg – (Sweden)
- The Model and the Marriage Broker, starring Jeanne Crain, Thelma Ritter, Scott Brady, Zero Mostel
- Mr. Imperium, starring Lana Turner and Ezio Pinza
- My Favorite Spy, starring Bob Hope and Hedy Lamarr

=== N ===
- New Mexico, starring Lew Ayres and Marilyn Maxwell
- The Night Before Christmas (Noch pered Rozhdestvom) – (U.S.S.R.)
- No Highway in the Sky (No Highway), starring James Stewart, Glynis Johns and Marlene Dietrich – (GB)

=== O ===
- Olivia, directed by Jacqueline Audry – (France)
- On Dangerous Ground, starring Ida Lupino and Robert Ryan
- On Moonlight Bay, starring Doris Day and Gordon MacRae
- On the Riviera, starring Danny Kaye
- One Summer of Happiness (Hon dansade en sommar) – (Sweden)
- Only the Valiant, starring Gregory Peck

=== P ===
- Painting the Clouds with Sunshine, starring Virginia Mayo
- Pandora and the Flying Dutchman, starring Ava Gardner and James Mason – (GB)
- Paris Vice Squad (Identité judiciaire) – (France)
- Payment on Demand, starring Bette Davis and Barry Sullivan
- Penny Points to Paradise, starring Harry Secombe, Peter Sellers and Spike Milligan – (GB)
- The People Against O'Hara, starring Spencer Tracy
- People Will Talk, starring Cary Grant, Jeanne Crain, Hume Cronyn and Finlay Currie
- A Place in the Sun, directed by George Stevens, starring Montgomery Clift, Elizabeth Taylor, Shelley Winters and Raymond Burr
- Pool of London, directed by Basil Dearden, starring Leslie Phillips, James Robertson Justice and Earl Cameron – (GB)
- The Prowler, directed by Joseph Losey, starring Van Heflin and Evelyn Keyes

=== Q ===
- Quo Vadis, directed by Mervyn LeRoy, starring Robert Taylor, Deborah Kerr, Peter Ustinov and Leo Genn

=== R ===
- The Racket, starring Robert Mitchum
- The Raging Tide, starring Richard Conte and Shelley Winters
- Rawhide, starring Tyrone Power and Susan Hayward
- The Red Badge of Courage, directed by John Huston, starring Audie Murphy
- Red Mountain, starring Alan Ladd and Lizabeth Scott
- Repast (Meshi), directed by Mikio Naruse, written by the novelist Yasunari Kawabata – (Japan)
- El revoltoso (The Rebellious) – (Mexico)
- Rhubarb, starring Ray Milland, Jan Sterling, William Frawley and Leonard Nimoy
- Rich, Young and Pretty, starring Jane Powell
- The River (Le Fleuve), directed by Jean Renoir – (France/India/US)
- Royal Wedding, starring Fred Astaire, Peter Lawford and Jane Powell

=== S ===
- ...Sans laisser d'adresse (No Forwarding Address), starring Bernard Blier and Danièle Delorme – (France)
- Santa Fe, starring Randolph Scott
- Saturday's Hero, starring John Derek and Donna Reed
- Scrooge (A Christmas Carol), starring Alastair Sim – (GB)
- The Secret of Convict Lake, starring Glenn Ford and Gene Tierney
- Selamat Berdjuang, Masku!, starring Raden Sukarno and Marlia Hardi – (Indonesia)
- Sherlock Holmes (British) series of 6 made-for TV Sherlock Holmes films directed by C. A. Lajeune, all starring Alan Wheatley as Holmes and Raymond Francis as Watson
- Show Boat, a remake of the hit musical, starring Kathryn Grayson, Howard Keel, and Ava Gardner, with songs by Oscar Hammerstein II and Jerome Kern
- Silver City, starring Edmond O'Brien and Yvonne De Carlo
- The Sinner, directed by Willi Forst, starring Hildegard Knef and Gustav Fröhlich (West Germany)
- Sirocco, starring Humphrey Bogart and Märta Torén
- Slaughter Trail, starring Gig Young and Virginia Grey
- Smuggler's Island, starring Jeff Chandler and Evelyn Keyes
- Spring Season (Bahar), first Hindi film of Vyjayanthimala and the producer A. V. Meiyappan – (India)
- Starlift, starring Janice Rule and Ruth Roman
- The Steel Helmet, directed by Samuel Fuller
- Storm Warning, starring Ginger Rogers, Ronald Reagan and Doris Day
- The Strange Door, starring Charles Laughton and Boris Karloff
- Strangers on a Train, directed by Alfred Hitchcock, starring Farley Granger and Robert Walker
- A Streetcar Named Desire, directed by Elia Kazan, starring Vivien Leigh (Oscar for best actress), Marlon Brando, Kim Hunter and Karl Malden
- Strictly Dishonorable, starring Ezio Pinza and Janet Leigh
- The Strip, starring Mickey Rooney and Sally Forrest
- Sugarfoot, starring Randolph Scott
- Summer Interlude (Sommarlek), directed by Ingmar Bergman – (Sweden)
- Superman and the Mole Men, starring George Reeves
- Susana (a.k.a. The Devil and the Flesh), directed by Luis Buñuel – (Mexico)
- The Sword of Monte Cristo, starring George Montgomery

=== T ===
- Take Care of My Little Girl, directed by Jean Negulesco, starring Jeanne Crain and Mitzi Gaynor
- A Tale of Five Cities (Passaporto per l'oriente) – (Italy/GB)
- The Tale of Genji (Genji Monogatari) – (Japan)
- The Tales of Hoffmann, a cinematic opera directed by Powell and Pressburger and starring Moira Shearer – (GB)
- The Tall Target, starring Dick Powell, Adolphe Menjou, Marshall Thompson and Ruby Dee
- Tarana, starring Madhubala and Dilip Kumar – (India)
- Tetsu no tsume, directed by Nobuo Adachi for Daiei Films
- That Happy Couple (Esa pareja feliz), directed by Juan Antonio Bardem and Luis García Berlanga – (Spain)
- That's My Boy, starring Dean Martin and Jerry Lewis
- The Thing from Another World, produced by Howard Hawks, starring Kenneth Tobey and James Arness as the title creature
- Three Guys Named Mike, starring Jane Wyman
- Thunder on the Hill, directed by Douglas Sirk, starring Claudette Colbert and Ann Blyth
- Tom Brown's Schooldays, starring John Howard Davies and Robert Newton – (GB)
- Tomahawk, starring Van Heflin and Yvonne De Carlo
- Two of a Kind, starring Edmond O'Brien and Lizabeth Scott
- Two Tickets to Broadway, starring Janet Leigh, Tony Martin, Gloria DeHaven

=== V ===
- Vengeance Valley, starring Burt Lancaster and Joanne Dru
- Victimas del Pecado (Victims of Sin) – (Mexico)

=== W ===
- Warpath, starring Edmond O'Brien, Forrest Tucker, Polly Bergen
- Warsaw Premiere, directed by Jan Rybkowski (Poland)
- The Well, starring Harry Morgan
- Westward the Women, starring Robert Taylor
- When Worlds Collide, starring Richard Derr, Barbara Rush, Larry Keating, John Hoyt and Hayden Rorke
- Where No Vultures Fly, directed by Harry Watt, starring Anthony Steel, Dinah Sheridan, Harold Warrender and Meredith Edwards – (U.K.)

=== Y ===
- You Never Can Tell, starring Dick Powell
- Young Wives' Tale, starring Joan Greenwood – (GB)
- You're in the Navy Now, starring Gary Cooper
- Your Day Will Come (Lak Yawm Ya Zalem) – (Egypt)

== Serials ==
- Captain Video: Master of the Stratosphere, starring Judd Holdren
- Don Daredevil Rides Again, starring Ken Curtis and Aline Towne
- Government Agents vs Phantom Legion, starring Walter Reed
- Mysterious Island, starring Richard Crane
- Roar of the Iron Horse, starring Buster Crabbe

== Short film series ==
- Mickey Mouse (1928–1953)
- Looney Tunes (1930–1969)
- Merrie Melodies (1931–1969)
- Popeye (1933–1957)
- The Three Stooges (1934–1959)
- Donald Duck (1936–1956)
- Pluto (1937–1951)
- Goofy (1939–1953)
- Tom and Jerry (1940–1958)
- Bugs Bunny (1940–1964)
- Mighty Mouse (1942–1955)
- Chip and Dale (1943–1956)
- Yosemite Sam (1945–1963)
- Terrytoons (1930–1971)
- Noveltoons (1944–1967)

== Births ==
- January 1 - Nana Patekar, Indian actor, screenwriter, and film director (died 2026)
- January 8 – John McTiernan, American director
- January 11 - Sondra Currie, American actress
- January 12 – Kirstie Alley, American actress (died 2022)
- January 15
  - Charo, Spanish American actress, singer and comedian
  - Basil Wallace, Jamaican-born American actor
- January 19 - Arthur Taxier, American character actor
- January 22 - Steve J. Spears, Australian actor, writer and singer (died 2007)
- January 23 - David Patrick Kelly, American actor and musician
- January 29 - Maria Klenskaja, Estonian actress (died 2022)
- January 30
  - Phil Collins, English drummer, singer-songwriter and actor
  - Charles S. Dutton, American retired actor and director
- February 1 - Tom Butler, Canadian actor
- February 4 - Patrick Bergin, Irish actor and singer
- February 5 - Robin Sachs, English actor (died 2013)
- February 13 – David Naughton, American actor & singer
- February 15
  - Paul Kandel, American actor and singer
  - Jane Seymour, English actress
- February 16 – William Katt, American actor
- February 20
  - Edward Albert, American actor (died 2006)
  - Eva Rueber-Staier, Austrian actress, television host and model
  - John Voldstad, American actor
- February 22 – Ellen Greene, American singer and actress
- February 24 – Helen Shaver, Canadian actress and film and television director
- March 6 - Virendra Razdan, Indian actor (died 2003)
- March 17 – Kurt Russell, American actor
- April 6 – Rita Raave, Estonian actress
- April 11
  - Gerry Becker, American actor (died 2019)
  - Jay Benedict, American actor (died 2020)
  - Rohini Hattangadi, Indian actress
- April 12 – Tom Noonan, American actor (died 2026)
- April 13
  - John Furey, American actor
  - Brent Jennings, American actor
- April 17 – Olivia Hussey, Argentine-born English actress (died 2024)
- April 21 – Tony Danza, American actor and boxer
- April 22 - Robin Bartlett, American actress
- April 24 - Steven Lisberger, American director, producer and screenwriter
- May 4 - Gérard Jugnot, French actor, director, screenwriter and producer
- May 5
  - Marion Bailey, English actress
  - Jeanie Drynan, Australian actress
- May 8 - Cooper Huckabee, American actor
- May 19 - Robert Harper, American actor (died 2020)
- May 25 - Patti D'Arbanville, American actress
- May 29 - Michael O'Neill, American actor
- May 30 – Stephen Tobolowsky, American actor
- May 31 - Jack Gilpin, American actor
- June 1 - Lena Farugia, American-born South African actress, screenwriter, director and producer (died 2019)
- June 2 - Frank C. Turner, Canadian actor
- June 5
  - Ellen Foley, American singer and actress
  - Mark Harelik, American actor and playwright
- June 8 - Bonnie Tyler, Welsh singer (died 2026)
- June 9 – James Newton Howard, American film composer
- June 13 - Stellan Skarsgård, Swedish actor
- June 15 - Tim Colceri, American actor and comedian
- June 16 - John Salthouse, British actor and producer
- June 20 - Tress MacNeille, American voice actress, and singer
- June 23 - Jim Metzler, retired American actor
- June 26 – Robert Davi, American actor, singer, writer and director
- June 27
  - Julia Duffy, American actress
  - Howard Jackson, American kickboxer, actor and stuntman (died 2006)
- June 28
  - David Gautreaux, American actor
  - Ellis E. Williams, American actor and comedian
- July 1 - Trevor Eve, English actor
- July 4 – Vincent Marzello, American-born actor (died 2020)
- July 6
  - Allyce Beasley, American actress
  - Geoffrey Rush, Australian actor
- July 7 - Roz Ryan, American actress, singer, voice actress and comedian
- July 8 – Anjelica Huston, American actress
- July 9 – Chris Cooper, American actor
- July 10 – Phyllis Smith, American actress
- July 12
  - Brian Grazer, American producer
  - Cheryl Ladd, American actress
  - Jamey Sheridan, American actor
- July 13 - Didi Conn, American actress
- July 15 - Jesse Ventura, American actor and pro wrestler
- July 18 - Margo Martindale, American character actress
- July 19 - Daniel Zacapa, Honduran-American actor
- July 20 - Jeff Rawle, English actor
- July 21
  - Lillias White, American actress and singer
  - Robin Williams, American actor & comedian (died 2014)
- July 24
  - Lynda Carter, American actress & singer
  - Fiona Reid, English-born Canadian actress
- July 29
  - Jack Blessing, American actor (died 2017)
  - Gavan O'Herlihy, Irish-born American actor (died 2021)
- August 2 - Marcel Iureș, Romanian actor
- August 3 - Jay North, American actor (died 2025)
- August 6 – Catherine Hicks, American actress
- August 7 - Deborah Offner, American actress
- August 8
  - Martin Brest, American director, screenwriter and producer
  - Mamoru Oshii, Japanese filmmaker, television director and writer
  - Nansun Shi, Hong Kong producer and executive (died 2026)
- August 14 – Carl Lumbly, American actor
- August 17 - Robert Joy, Canadian actor
- August 18 - Moni Moshonov, Israeli actor and comedian
- August 21 - Randy Thom, American sound designer
- August 22 - Gordon Liu, Chinese martial arts actor
- August 24 - Tony Amendola, American actor
- August 30 – Timothy Bottoms, American actor
- September 1 - Luce Rains, American actor
- September 2
  - Michael Gray, American actor (died 2026)
  - Mark Harmon, American actor
- September 4 - Judith Ivey, American actress
- September 5 – Michael Keaton, American actor
- September 9 - Tom Wopat, American actor and singer
- September 10 - Harry Groener, German-born American actor
- September 12 – Joe Pantoliano, American actor
- September 13 - Jean Smart, American actress
- September 17 – Cassandra Peterson, American actress
- September 22 – Amanda Mackey, American casting director (died 2022)
- September 25 – Mark Hamill, American actor
- September 29 - Cindy Morgan, American actress (died 2023)
- October 2 - Romina Power, American actress
- October 3 - Joel Polis, American actor
- October 5 - Karen Allen, American actress and director
- October 9 - Robert Wuhl, American actor, comedian and writer
- October 16
  - Daniel Gerroll, English actor
  - Morgan Stevens, American actor (died 2022)
- October 19 - Floyd Vivino, American actor (died 2026)
- October 22 - Marshall Napier, New Zealand character actor (died 2022)
- October 24 - Antoñito Ruiz, Spanish former child actor and stuntman
- October 28 - Renato Cecchetto, Italian actor and voice actor (died 2022)
- October 30 – Harry Hamlin, American actor
- November 2 - Steven Reuther, American producer (died 2010)
- November 6 - Nigel Havers, English actor and presenter
- November 9
  - John Benfield, British character actor (died 2020)
  - Lou Ferrigno, American actor
- November 11 - Bill Moseley, American actor and musician
- November 14 - Sandahl Bergman, American former actress
- November 15 – Beverly D'Angelo, American actress
- November 16 - Miguel Sandoval, American actor
- November 17
  - Francis Guinan, American actor
  - Stephen Root, American actor and voice actor
  - Libby Villari, American actress
- November 20 – Rodger Bumpass, American actor & voice actor
- November 23 – Aaron Norris, American director, actor, and stunt performer
- November 27 – Kathryn Bigelow, American director
- November 30 - Ian Roberts, South African actor and singer
- December 1
  - Obba Babatundé, American actor
  - Treat Williams, American actor (died 2023)
- December 14 - Celia Weston, American character actress
- December 16
  - Bill Johnson, American actor
  - David Schofield, English actor
- December 18 - Everett Quinton, American actor and writer (died 2023)
- December 22 - Dan Martin, American actor
- December 26 - Steve Bisley, Australian writer and actor
- December 27 – Charles Band, American film producer and director
- December 30 - Deirdre O'Connell, American character actress

== Deaths ==
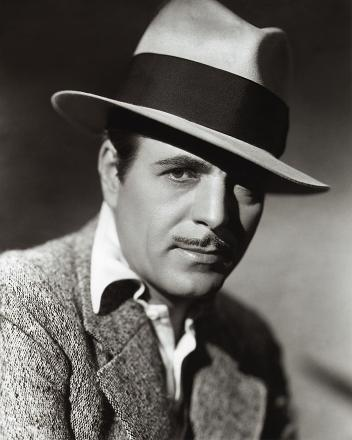
The Oscar winner Warner Baxter publicity photo.

- January 11 – Charles W. Goddard, American playwright, screenwriter (born 1879), The Exploits of Elaine
- January 18 – Jack Holt, American actor (born 1888), Flight, San Francisco
- March 6 – Ivor Novello, Welsh actor, singer, composer (born 1893), The Lodger, I Lived with You
- March 14 – Val Lewton, Russian-American director (born 1904), Cat People, The Body Snatcher
- March 25 – Oscar Micheaux, American director, author (born 1884), The Girl From Chicago
- April 4 – Al Christie, Canadian-born director, producer (born 1881), Charley's Aunt
- April 22 – Stanley Ridges, British actor (born 1890), To Be or Not to Be, Sergeant York
- May 2 – Edwin L. Marin, American director (born 1899), Fort Worth, Maisie
- May 2 – Paul L. Stein, Austrian director (born 1892), Red Wagon, The Twenty Questions Murder Mystery
- May 7 – Warner Baxter, American actor (born 1882), 42nd Street, Crime Doctor
- May 17 – S. Sylvan Simon, American director (born 1910), The Fuller Brush Man, I Love Trouble
- May 29 – Fanny Brice, American entertainer and actress, My Man,Everybody Sing (born 1891)
- June 2 – Ernst Pittschau, German actor (born 1883), The Picture of Dorian Gray
- June 6 – Olive Tell, American actress (born 1894), The Trap
- June 9 – Mayo Methot, American actress (born 1904), Marked Woman
- July 23 – Robert J. Flaherty, American documentary filmmaker (born 1884), Nanook of the North
- August 16 – Louis Jouvet, French actor (born 1887), Hôtel du Nord
- August 28 – Robert Walker, American actor (born 1918), Strangers on a Train, The Clock
- August 30 – Konstantin Märska, Estonian cinematographer (born 1896)
- August 31 – Paul Demel, Czech actor (born 1903)
- September 7 – Maria Montez, Dominican-born actress (born 1912), Arabian Nights, Ali Baba and the Forty Thieves
- October 12 – Leon Errol, Australian-born actor (born 1881), Never Give a Sucker an Even Break, Joe Palooka
- October 22 – Phil Rosen, Polish-American director (born 1876), Charlie Chan in The Chinese Cat, Roar of the Press
- November 3 – Richard Wallace, American director (born 1894), Tycoon, Framed

== Film debuts ==
- Dawn Addams – Night into Morning
- John Alderson – The Highwayman
- Merry Anders – Golden Girl
- Bibi Andersson – Miss Julie
- Joanne Arnold – Ten Tall Men
- Ian Bannen – Pool of London
- Elmer Bernstein (film composer) – Saturday's Hero
- Theodore Bikel – The African Queen
- Edward Binns – Teresa
- Donald Bisset – Murder in the Cathedral
- Richard Boone – Halls of Montezuma
- Ernest Borgnine – China Corsair
- Willis Bouchey – Elopement
- William Boyett – Street Bandits
- Jeff Bridges – The Company She Keeps
- Charles Bronson – You're in the Navy Now
- Richard Caldicot – Calling Bulldog Drummond
- Earl Cameron – Pool of London
- Christine Carère – Olivia
- Timothy Carey – Ace in the Hole
- Leslie Caron – An American in Paris
- John Cassavetes – Fourteen Hours
- Daniel Cauchy – Nous irons à Monte-Carlo
- Joan Collins – Lady Godiva Rides Again
- Mara Corday – Two Tickets to Broadway
- Scatman Crothers – Yes Sir, Mr. Bones
- Brenda de Banzie – The Long Dark Hall
- Vince Edwards – Mister Universe
- John Ericson – Teresa
- Steve Forrest – Sealed Cargo
- Wera Frydtberg – The Sinner
- Harold Gould – The Man from Planet X
- Lee Grant – Detective Story
- Peter Graves – Rogue River
- Harry Guardino – Up Front
- Anne Heywood – Lady Godiva Rides Again
- Sérgio Hingst – Ângela
- Ulla Jacobsson – In the Arms of the Sea
- Joyce Jameson – Show Boat
- Roy Jenson – Distant Drums
- Richard Johnson – Captain Horatio Hornblower
- Don Keefer – Death of a Salesman
- Nancy Kulp – The Model and the Marriage Broker
- Harvey Lembeck – You're in the Navy Now
- Terence Longdon – Appointment with Venus
- John Lupton – St. Benny the Dip
- Jack MacGowran – No Resting Place
- Lee Marvin – You're in the Navy Now
- Patty McCormack – Two Gals and a Guy
- Leo McKern – Murder in the Cathedral
- Ralph Meeker – Die Vier im Jeep
- Mary Murphy – The Lemon Drop Kid
- Burt Mustin – The Last Outpost
- Leonard Nimoy – Queen for a Day
- Sheree North – Excuse My Dust
- Aldo Ray – Saturday's Hero
- Paul Richards – Fixed Bayonets!
- Luisa Rivelli – Behind Closed Shutters
- Lyla Rocco – Anna
- Paul Rogers – Murder in the Cathedral
- William Shatner – The Butler's Night Off
- Robert Shaw – The Lavender Hill Mob
- Rod Steiger – Teresa
- Warren Stevens – Follow the Sun
- Larry Storch – The Prince Who Was a Thief
- Sabine Thalbach – Der Untertan
- Harry Towb – The Quiet Woman
- Les Tremayne – Adventures in the Red Sea
- Mamie Van Doren – Footlight Varieties
- Joyce Van Patten – Fourteen Hours
- Stuart Whitman – When Worlds Collide
- Manuel Zarzo – Day by Day
