= List of highest-grossing films in the Soviet Union =

This is the list of highest-grossing films in the Soviet Union, in terms of box office admissions (ticket sales). It includes the highest-grossing films in the Soviet Union (USSR), the highest-grossing domestic Soviet films, the domestic films with the greatest number of ticket sales by year, and the highest-grossing foreign films in the Soviet Union. Note that, in line with the definition above, this list does not include any Soviet television series or television movies, which were not shown in cinemas of the Soviet Union.

The annual list includes sales during each year only, which often means that the total number of tickets sold was bigger. As an example, according to the list below the film The Red Snowball Tree, the top seller of the year 1974, sold 62.5 million tickets during that year. But the total number of sold tickets during all years was bigger; Boris Pavlenok, former deputy director of the USSR GosKino, estimated 140 million. This figure is comparable to some of the United States' all-time highest ticket sellers, such as The Sound of Music, E.T. the Extra-Terrestrial, and Titanic, exceeding the latter's estimated ticket sales of 135.5 million.

In the mid-1960s, the Soviet box office annually sold 4 billion tickets and grossed 1 billion Rbls, equivalent to $1.11 billion (inflation-adjusted $11 billion). In 1973, annual box office admissions reached 4.5 billion ticket sales, equivalent to $2 billion (inflation-adjusted $15 billion) gross revenue and 17.7 admissions per person, more than any other country at the time. Soviet ticket prices were lower than American ticket prices, due to lower living costs in the Soviet Union. Ticket prices ranged from 0.50 Rbl to 6 Rbls in 1950, before decreasing to 0.25 руб by the mid-1960s, then increasing to $0.47 by 1973 and then 0.50 Rbl by 1982.

Both domestic Soviet films and foreign films were shown, the latter having a limited quota and thus drawing higher average ticket sales than domestic productions. Indian films had the strongest presence in the foreign blockbuster charts for four decades, followed by American films. Foreign imports included 300 Indian films (most of which were Bollywood films), 41 American films (Hollywood), and 38 French films.

== Highest-grossing films ==
=== Including re-runs ===
Title		Country	Release year		Tickets (est.)	Ref
English	Russian	Country	Original	Soviet	Tickets (est.)	Ref
The Red Snowball Tree	Калина красная	USSR	1974	1974	140,000,000	
Disco Dancer	Танцор диско	India	1982	1984	120,000,000	
Awaara (The Vagabond)	Бродяга	India	1951	1954	100,000,000	
Amphibian Man	Человек-амфибия	USSR	1962	1962	100,000,000	
War and Peace (Part I & Part II)	Война и мир	USSR	1966	1966	94,500,000	
Yesenia	Есения	Mexico	1971	1975	91,400,000	
Spartacus	Спартак	USA	1960	1967	91,200,000	
Pirates of the 20th Century	Пираты XX века	USSR	1980	1980	87,600,000	
Moscow Does Not Believe in Tears	Москва слезам не верит	USSR	1980	1980	84,400,000	
The Diamond Arm	Бриллиантовая рука	USSR	1969	1969	76,700,000	
The Black Tulip	Чёрный тюльпан	France	1964	1970	76,700,000	
Kidnapping, Caucasian Style	Кавказская пленница	USSR	1967	1967	76,540,000	
Mera Naam Joker	Моё имя Клоун	India	1970	1972	73,100,000	
Some Like It Hot	В джазе только девушки	USA	1959	1966	72,800,000	
The 7th Voyage of Sinbad	Седьмое путешествие Синдбада	USA	1958	1960	70,100,000	
Operation Y and Shurik's Other Adventures	Операция „Ы“ и другие приключения Шурика	USSR	1965	1965	69,600,000	
The Shield and the Sword	Щит и меч	USSR	1968	1968	68,300,000	
The Magnificent Seven	Великолепная семёрка	USA	1960	1961	67,000,000	
The New Adventures of the Elusive Avengers	Новые приключения Неуловимых	USSR	1968	1968	66,200,000	
The Dawns Here Are Quiet	А зори здесь тихие	USSR	1972	1972	66,000,000	
Gentlemen of Fortune	Джентльмены удачи	USSR	1972	1972	65,020,000	
Gypsies Are Found Near Heaven	Табор уходит в небо	USSR	1976	1976	64,900,000	
Mackenna's Gold	Золото Маккенны	United States	1969	1974	63,000,000	
Bobby	Бобби	India	1973	1975	62,600,000	
Afonya	Афоня	USSR	1975	1975	62,200,000	

=== Initial runs ===
Rank	Title		Country	Release year		Tickets sold
Rank	English	Russian	Country	Original	Soviet	Tickets sold
1	Yesenia	Есения	Mexico	1971	1975	91,400,000
2	Pirates of the 20th Century	Пираты XX века	USSR	1980	1980	87,600,000
3	Moscow Does Not Believe in Tears	Москва слезам не верит	USSR	1980	1980	84,400,000
4	The Diamond Arm	Бриллиантовая рука	USSR	1969	1969	76,700,000
5	Kidnapping, Caucasian Style	Кавказская пленница	USSR	1967	1967	76,540,000
6	Air Crew	Экипаж	USSR	1980	1980	71,100,000
7	Operation Y and Shurik's Other Adventures	Операция „Ы“ и другие приключения Шурика	USSR	1965	1965	69,600,000
8	The Shield and the Sword	Щит и меч	USSR	1968	1968	68,300,000
9	The Magnificent Seven	Великолепная семёрка	USA	1960	1961	67,000,000
10	The New Adventures of the Elusive Avengers	Новые приключения Неуловимых	USSR	1968	1968	66,200,000
11	The Dawns Here Are Quiet	А зори здесь тихие	USSR	1972	1972	66,000,000
12	Amphibian Man	Человек-амфибия	USSR	1962	1962	65,500,000
13	Gentlemen of Fortune	Джентльмены удачи	USSR	1972	1972	65,020,000
14	Gypsies Are Found Near Heaven	Табор уходит в небо	USSR	1976	1976	64,900,000
15	Awaara (The Vagabond)	Бродяга	India	1951	1954	63,700,000
16	Mackenna's Gold	Золото Маккенны	USA	1969	1974	63,000,000
17	Spartacus	Спартак	USA	1960	1967	63,000,000
18	Bobby	Бобби	India	1973	1975	62,600,000
19	The Red Snowball Tree	Калина красная	USSR	1974	1974	62,500,000
20	Afonya	Афоня	USSR	1975	1975	62,200,000

=== Highest-grossing by year ===
Year	English title	Russian title	Country	Original release	Tickets sold	Ref
1940	The Fighters	Истребители	Soviet Union	1939	27,100,000	
1944	Six P.M.	В шесть часов вечера после войны	Soviet Union	1944	26,100,000	
1945	Guilty Without Guilt	Без вины виноватые	Soviet Union	1945	28,910,000	
1946	The Stone Flower	Каменный цветок	Soviet Union	1946	23,170,000	
1947	Secret Agent	Подвиг разведчика	Soviet Union	1947	22,730,000	
1948	The Young Guard	Молодая гвардия	Soviet Union	1948	42,400,000	
1949	Encounter at the Elbe	Встреча на Эльбе	Soviet Union	1949	24,200,000	
1950	Brave People (The Horsemen)	Смелые люди	Soviet Union	1950	41,200,000	
1951	In Peaceful Time	В мирные дни	Soviet Union	1951	23,500,000	
1952	Tarzan the Ape Man	Тарзан	United States	1932	42,900,000	
1953	Lyubov Yarovaya	Любовь Яровая	Soviet Union	1953	46,400,000	
1954	Awaara (The Vagabond)	Бродяга	India	1951	63,700,000	
1955	Private Ivan	Солдат Иван Бровкин	Soviet Union	1955	40,370,000	
1956	Carnival Night	Карнавальная ночь	Soviet Union	1956	48,640,000	
1957	The Sisters	Сёстры	Soviet Union	1957	42,500,000	
1958	Over Tissa	Над Тиссой	Soviet Union	1958	45,740,000	
1959	E. A. — Extraordinary Accident	Ч. П.-Чрезвычайное Происшествие	Soviet Union	1959	47,500,000	
1960	Far from the Motherland	Вдали от Родины	Soviet Union	1960	42,000,000	
1961	El Murra el Maghoula (The Unknown Woman)	Неизвестная женщина	United Arab Republic	1959	37,900,000	
1962	The Magnificent Seven	Великолепная семёрка	United States	1960	67,000,000	
1963	Optimistic Tragedy	Оптимистическая трагедия	Soviet Union	1963	46,000,000	
1964	The Alive and the Dead	Живые и мёртвые	Soviet Union	1964	41,500,000	
1965	Operation Y and Shurik's Other Adventures	Операция „Ы“ и другие приключения Шурика	Soviet Union	1965	69,600,000	
1966	War and Peace – Part I: Andrei Bolkonsky	Война и мир: Андрей Болконский	Soviet Union	1966	58,300,000	
1967	Kidnapping, Caucasian Style	Кавказская пленница, или Новые приключения Шурика	Soviet Union	1967	76,540,000	
1968	The Shield and the Sword	Щит и меч	Soviet Union	1968	68,300,000	
1969	The Diamond Arm	Бриллиантовая рука	Soviet Union	1969	76,700,000	
1970	The Black Tulip	Чёрный тюльпан	France / Italy / Spain	1964	47,800,000	
1971	Officers	Офицеры	Soviet Union	1971	53,400,000	
1972	Gentlemen of Fortune	Джентльмены удачи	Soviet Union	1972	65,020,000	
1973	The Headless Horseman	Всадник без головы	Soviet Union	1973	64,900,000	
1974	Mackenna's Gold	Золото Маккенны	United States	1969	63,000,000	
1975	Yesenia	Есения	Mexico	1971	91,400,000	
1976	Gypsies Are Found Near Heaven	Табор уходит в небо	Soviet Union	1976	64,900,000	
1977	The Age of Innocence (Minors)	Несовершеннолетние	Soviet Union	1977	44,600,000	
1978	Barood (Gunpowder)	Мститель	India	1976	60,000,000	
1979	The Woman who Sings	Женщина, которая поёт	Soviet Union	1979	54,900,000	
1980	Pirates of the 20th Century	Пираты ХХ века	Soviet Union	1980	87,600,000	
1981	Teheran 43	Тегеран-43	Soviet Union	1981	47,500,000	
1982	Sportloto-82	Спортлото-82	Soviet Union	1982	55,200,000	
1983	The Taming of the Scoundrel	Укрощение строптивого	Italy	1980	56,000,000	
1984	Disco Dancer	Танцор диско	India	1982	60,900,000	
1985	The Most Charming and Attractive	Самая обаятельная и привлекательная	Soviet Union	1985	44,900,000	
1986	Double Trap	Двойной капкан	Soviet Union	1986	42,900,000	
1987	A Man from the Boulevard des Capucines	Человек с бульвара Капуцинов	Soviet Union	1987	39,800,000	
1988	Little Vera	Маленькая Вера	Soviet Union	1988	54,900,000	
1989	Crocodile Dundee II	Крокодил Данди 2	Australia	1988	45,800,000	

== Highest-grossing domestic films ==
=== Including re-runs ===
Russian title	English title	Year	Tickets sold (est.)	Ref
Калина красная	The Red Snowball Tree	1974	140,000,000	
Человек-амфибия	Amphibian Man	1962	100,000,000	
Война и мир	War and Peace (Part I and Part II)	1966	94,500,000	
Пираты XX века	Pirates of the 20th Century	1980	87,600,000	
Москва слезам не верит	Moscow Does Not Believe in Tears	1980	84,400,000	
Бриллиантовая рука	The Diamond Arm	1969	76,700,000	
Кавказская пленница	Kidnapping, Caucasian Style	1967	76,540,000	
Свадьба в Малиновке	Wedding in Malinovka	1967	74,600,000	
Экипаж	Air Crew	1980	71,100,000	
Операция „Ы“ и другие приключения Шурика	Operation Y and Shurik's Other Adventures	1965	69,600,000	
Щит и меч	The Shield and the Sword	1968	68,300,000	
Новые приключения Неуловимых	The New Adventures of the Elusive Avengers	1968	66,200,000	
А зори здесь тихие	The Dawns Here Are Quiet	1972	66,000,000	
Джентльмены удачи	Gentlemen of Fortune	1972	65,020,000	
Табор уходит в небо	Gypsies Are Found Near Heaven	1976	64,900,000	
Афоня	Afonya	1975	62,200,000	
Корона Российской империи, или Снова Неуловимые	The Crown of the Russian Empire, or Once Again the Elusive Avengers	1973	60,800,000	
Иван Васильевич меняет профессию	Ivan Vasilievich: Back to the Future	1973	60,700,000	
Мачеха	Stepmom	1973	59,400,000	
Служебный роман	Office Romance	1978	58,400,000	

=== Initial runs ===
Rank	Russian title	English title	Year	Tickets sold
1	Пираты XX века	Pirates of the 20th Century	1980	87,600,000
2	Москва слезам не верит	Moscow Does Not Believe in Tears	1980	84,400,000
3	Бриллиантовая рука	The Diamond Arm	1969	76,700,000
4	Кавказская пленница	Kidnapping, Caucasian Style	1967	76,540,000
5	Свадьба в Малиновке	Wedding in Malinovka	1967	74,600,000
6	Экипаж	Air Crew	1980	71,100,000
7	Операция „Ы“ и другие приключения Шурика	Operation Y and Shurik's Other Adventures	1965	69,600,000
8	Щит и меч	The Shield and the Sword	1968	68,300,000
9	Новые приключения Неуловимых	The New Adventures of the Elusive Avengers	1968	66,200,000
10	А зори здесь тихие	The Dawns Here Are Quiet	1972	66,000,000
11	Человек-амфибия	Amphibian Man	1962	65,500,000
12	Джентльмены удачи	Gentlemen of Fortune	1972	65,020,000
13	Табор уходит в небо	Gypsies Are Found Near Heaven	1976	64,900,000
14	Калина красная	The Red Snowball Tree	1974	62,500,000
15	Афоня	Afonya	1975	62,200,000
16	Корона Российской империи, или Снова Неуловимые	The Crown of the Russian Empire, or Once Again the Elusive Avengers	1973	60,800,000
17	Иван Васильевич меняет профессию	Ivan Vasilievich: Back to the Future	1973	60,700,000
18	Мачеха	Stepmom	1973	59,400,000
19	Служебный роман	Office Romance	1978	58,400,000
20	Война и мир: Андрей Болконский	War and Peace – Part I: Andrei Bolkonsky	1966	58,300,000

=== Highest-grossing by year ===
Year	Russian title	English title	Tickets sold	IMDb entry
1940	Истребители	The Fighters	27,100,000	
1944	В шесть часов вечера после войны	Six P.M.	26,100,000	
1945	Без вины виноватые	Guilty Without Guilt	28,910,000	
1946	Каменный цветок	The Stone Flower	23,170,000	
1947	Подвиг разведчика	Secret Agent	22,730,000	
1948	Молодая гвардия	The Young Guard	42,400,000	
1949	Встреча на Эльбе	Encounter at the Elbe	24,200,000	
1950	Смелые люди	Brave People (The Horsemen)	41,200,000	
1951	В мирные дни	In Peaceful Time	23,500,000	
1952	Незабываемый год 1919	The Unforgettable Year 1919	31,600,000	
1953	Любовь Яровая	Lyubov Yarovaya	46,400,000	
1954	Судьба Марины	Marina's Destiny	37,900,000	
1955	Солдат Иван Бровкин	Private Ivan	40,370,000	
1956	Карнавальная ночь	Carnival Night	48,640,000	
1957	Сёстры	The Sisters	42,500,000	
1958	Над Тиссой	Over Tissa	45,740,000	
1959	Ч. П.-Чрезвычайное Происшествие	E. A. — Extraordinary Accident	47,500,000	
1960	Вдали от Родины	Far from the Motherland	42,000,000	
1961	Полосатый рейс	Striped Trip	32,340,000	
1962	Человек-амфибия	Amphibian Man	65,500,000	
1963	Оптимистическая трагедия	Optimistic Tragedy	46,000,000	
1964	Живые и мёртвые	The Alive and the Dead	41,500,000	
1965	Операция „Ы“ и другие приключения Шурика	Operation Y and Shurik's Other Adventures	69,600,000	
1966	Война и мир: Андрей Болконский	War and Peace – Part I: Andrei Bolkonsky	58,300,000	
1967	Кавказская пленница, или Новые приключения Шурика	Kidnapping, Caucasian Style	76,540,000	
1968	Щит и меч	The Shield and the Sword	68,300,000	
1969	Бриллиантовая рука	The Diamond Arm	76,700,000	
1970	Неподсуден	Not Under the Jurisdiction	43,300,000	
1971	Офицеры	Officers	53,400,000	
1972	Джентльмены удачи	Gentlemen of Fortune	65,020,000	
1973	Всадник без головы	The Headless Horseman	64,900,000	
1974	Калина красная	The Red Snowball Tree	62,500,000	
1975	Афоня	Afonya	62,200,000	
1976	Табор уходит в небо	Gypsies Are Found Near Heaven	64,900,000	
1977	Несовершеннолетние	The Age of Innocence (Minors)	44,600,000	
1978	Служебный роман	Office Romance	58,400,000	
1979	Женщина, которая поёт	The Woman who Sings	54,900,000	
1980	Пираты ХХ века	Pirates of the 20th Century	87,600,000	
1981	Тегеран-43	Teheran 43	47,500,000	
1982	Спортлото-82	Sportloto-82	55,200,000	
1983	Вокзал для двоих	Station for Two	35,800,000	
1984	Любовь и голуби	Love and Pigeons	44,500,000	
1985	Самая обаятельная и привлекательная	The Most Charming and Attractive	44,900,000	
1986	Двойной капкан	Double Trap	42,900,000	
1987	Человек с бульвара Капуцинов	A Man from the Boulevard des Capucines	39,800,000	
1988	Маленькая Вера	Little Vera	54,900,000	
1989	Интердевочка	Intergirl	41,300,000	

== Highest-grossing foreign films ==
This is a list of foreign films that sold the most tickets at the Soviet box office. Among the foreign films that sold more than 20 million tickets in the Soviet Union, 50 were Indian films (Bollywood), the highest from any nation, followed by 41 American films (Hollywood) and 38 French films.

=== Including re-runs ===
Title		Country	Release year		Tickets sold (est.)	IMDb entry	Gross revenue (est.) (Note: Estimates based on number of tickets sold at average ticket price of 25 kopecks, unless otherwise noted.)		
English	Russian	Country	Original	Soviet	Tickets sold (est.)	IMDb entry	Rbl (millions)	US$ (millions)	Adjusted US$ (millions)
Disco Dancer	Танцор диско	India	1982	1984	120,000,000		60	75.85 (Note: 0.791 Rbl per dollar in 1984)	235
Awaara (The Vagabond)	Бродяга	India	1951	1954	100,000,000		37.75 (Note: Awaara in the Soviet Union: Initial run – 29 million Rbls ($7.25 million) (Note: 4 Rbls per US dollar from 1950 to 1960) in 1954 ($87 million adjusted for inflation); Re-runs – 8.75 million Rbls (Note: 35 million re-run admissions up until 1964-1966, average Soviet ticket price of 25 kopecks in the mid-1960s) ($9.72 million) (Note: 0.9 Rbl per dollar from 1961 to 1971) ($96 million adjusted for inflation))	16.97	143
Yesenia	Есения	Mexico	1971	1975	91,400,000		22.9+	43	257
Spartacus	Спартак	United States	1960	1967	91,200,000		22.8	25	241
The Black Tulip	Чёрный тюльпан	France	1964	1970	76,700,000		19.2		
Mera Naam Joker (My Name is Joker)	Моё имя Клоун	India	1970	1972	73,100,000		18.28	22.13	170
Some Like It Hot	В джазе только девушки	United States	1959	1966	72,800,000		18.2		
The 7th Voyage of Sinbad	Седьмое путешествие Синдбада	United States	1958	1960	70,100,000		17.5		
The Magnificent Seven	Великолепная семёрка	United States	1960	1962	67,000,000		16.75	18.61	201
Mackenna's Gold	Золото Маккенны	United States	1969	1974	63,000,000		15.8+	29.6	193
Bobby	Бобби	India	1973	1975	62,600,000		15.7+	29.4	176
Al-Ridaʼ al-Abyaḍ (The White Gown)	Белое платье	Egypt	1973	1976	61,000,000		15.25+	28.7	162
Barood (Gunpowder)	Мститель	India	1976	1978	60,000,000		15+	28.2	139
Sholay (Embers)	Месть и закон	India	1975	1979	60,000,000		15+	28.2	125
The Four Charlots Musketeers	Четыре мушкетёра Шарло	France	1974	1978	56,600,000		14.2+	26.6	131
The Taming of the Scoundrel	Укрощение строптивого	Italy	1980	1983	56,000,000		28	35.4	114
Apache Gold (Winnetou)	Виннету — Золото Апачей	West Germany	1963	1975	56,000,000		14+	26.3	157
Last of the Renegades (Winnetou 2)	Виннету — сын Инчу-Чуна	West Germany	1964	1975	56,000,000		14+	26.3	157
Zorro	Зорро	Italy	1975	1976	55,300,000		13.8+	26	147
Seeta Aur Geeta (Seeta and Geeta)	Зита и Гита	India	1972	1976	55,200,000		13.8+	25.9	147
Sun Valley Serenade	Серенада солнечной долины	United States	1941	1944	54,100,000				
King Kong Lives	Кинг Конг жив	United States	1986	1988	53,600,000		26.8	44.2	120
Mr. Robinson	Синьор Робинзон	Italy	1976	1979	52,100,000		13+	24.5	109
The Sucker	Разиня	France	1965	1965	52,000,000		13		
Mamta (Mother's Love)	Материнская любовь	India	1966	1969	51,800,000		13	14.4	126

=== Initial runs ===
Rank	English title	Russian title	Country	Original release	Soviet release	Tickets sold
1	Yesenia	Есения	Mexico	1971	1975	91,400,000
2	The Magnificent Seven	Великолепная семёрка	United States	1960	1961	67,000,000
3	Awaara (The Vagabond)	Бродяга	India	1951	1954	63,700,000
4	Mackenna's Gold	Золото Маккенны	United States	1969	1974	63,000,000
5	Spartacus	Спартак	United States	1960	1967	63,000,000
6	Bobby	Бобби	India	1973	1975	62,600,000
7	Al-Ridaʼ al-Abyaḍ (The White Gown)	Белое платье	Egypt	1973	1976	61,000,000
8	Disco Dancer	Танцор диско	India	1982	1984	60,900,000
9	Barood	Мститель	India	1976	1978	60,000,000
10	The Four Charlots Musketeers	Четыре мушкетёра Шарло	France	1974	1978	56,600,000
11	The Taming of the Scoundrel	Укрощение строптивого	Italy	1980	1983	56,000,000
12	Apache Gold (Winnetou)	Виннету — Золото Апачей	West Germany	1963	1975	56,000,000
13	Zorro	Зорро	Italy	1975	1976	55,300,000
14	Seeta Aur Geeta (Seeta and Geeta)	Зита и Гита	India	1972	1976	55,200,000
15	King Kong Lives	Кинг Конг жив	United States	1986	1988	53,600,000
16	Mr. Robinson	Синьор Робинзон	Italy	1976	1979	52,100,000
17	Mamta (Mother's Love)	Материнская любовь	India	1966	1969	51,800,000
18	Les bidasses s'en vont en guerre	Новобранцы идут на войну	France	1974	1978	50,100,000
19	Legend of Dinosaurs & Monster Birds	Легенда о динозавре	Japan	1977	1979	48,700,000
20	The Black Tulip	Чёрный тюльпан	France	1964	1970	48,700,000

=== Highest-grossing by year ===
Year	English title	Russian title	Country	Original release	Tickets sold	Ref
1940	The Great Waltz	Большой вальс	United States	1938	25,700,000	
1944	Sun Valley Serenade	Серенада солнечной долины	United States	1941	20,700,000	
1945	His Butler's Sister	Сестра его дворецкого	United States	1943	21,900,000	
1946	The Men in Her Life	Балерина	United States	1941	21,000,000	
1947	I Am a Fugitive from a Chain Gang	Я — беглый каторжник	United States	1932	19,100,000	
1948	The Indian Tomb	Индийская гробница	Germany	1938	18,600,000	
1950	Child of the Danube	Дитя Дуная	Austria	1950	20,900,000	
1951	The Tiger Akbar	Тигр Акбар	West Germany	1950	23,400,000	
1952	Tarzan the Ape Man	Тарзан	United States	1932	42,900,000	
1953	Das Herz einer Frau (The Heart of a Woman)	Мой маленький друг	Austria	1951	21,700,000	
1954	Awaara (The Vagabond)	Бродяга	India	1951	63,700,000	
1955	Fanfan la Tulipe	Фанфан-Тюльпан	France / Italy	1952	33,000,000	
1956	Shree 420 (Mr. 420)	Господин 420	India	1955	34,300,000	
1957	Love and Tears	Любовь и слёзы	Egypt	1955	32,000,000	
1958	Una cita de amor (A Date of Love)	Любовное свидание	Mexico	1958	32,300,000	
1959	La Sorcière (The Sorceress)	Колдунья	France / Sweden	1956	36,400,000	
1960	Twelve Girls and One Man	Двенадцать девушек и один мужчина	Austria	1959	33,400,000	
1961	El Murra el Maghoula (The Unknown Woman)	Неизвестная женщина	United Arab Republic	1959	37,900,000	
1962	The Magnificent Seven	Великолепная семёрка	United States	1960	67,000,000	
1963	Love in Simla	Любовь в Симле	India	1960	35,000,000	
1964	Who Are You, Mr. Sorge?	Кто вы, доктор Зорге?	France / Japan	1961	39,200,000	
1965	Dhool Ka Phool (Dust's Flower)	Цветок в пыли	India	1959	36,800,000	
1966	Some Like It Hot	В джазе только девушки	United States	1959	43,900,000	
1967	Spartacus	Спартак	United States	1960	63,000,000	
1968	Old Surehand	Верная Рука - друг индейцев	Germany / Yugoslavia	1965	46,500,000	
1969	Mamta (Mother's Love)	Материнская любовь	India	1966	51,800,000	
1970	The Black Tulip	Чёрный тюльпан	France / Italy / Spain	1964	47,800,000	
1971	Hamraaz (Confidant)	Хамраз	India	1967	42,400,000	
1972	Aradhana (Devotion)	Преданность	India	1969	47,400,000	
1973	The Sandpit Generals	Генералы песчаных карьеров	United States	1971	43,200,000	
1974	Mackenna's Gold	Золото Маккенны	United States	1969	63,000,000	
1975	Yesenia	Есения	Mexico	1971	91,400,000	
1976	Al-Ridaʼ al-Abyaḍ (The White Gown)	Белое платье	Egypt	1973	61,000,000	
1977	The 7th Voyage of Sinbad	Седьмое путешествие Синдбада	United States	1958	37,800,000	
1978	Barood (Gunpowder)	Мститель	India	1976	60,000,000	
1979	Mr. Robinson	Синьор Робинзон	Italy	1976	52,100,000	
1980	Among Vultures	Среди коршунов	Germany / Yugoslavia	1964	38,800,000	
1981	Raja Jani (Raja and His Sweetheart)	Любимый раджа	India	1972	40,100,000	
1982	Došlo doba da se ljubav proba	Пришло время любить	Yugoslavia	1979	37,600,000	
1983	The Taming of the Scoundrel	Укрощение строптивого	Italy	1980	56,000,000	
1984	Disco Dancer	Танцор диско	India	1982	60,900,000	
1985	Convoy	Конвой	United States	1978	35,900,000	
1986	Jagir (Estate)	Как три мушкетёра	India	1984	38,000,000	
1987	Starman	Человек со звезды	United States	1984	35,800,000	
1988	King Kong Lives	Кинг Конг жив	United States	1986	53,600,000	
1989	Crocodile Dundee II	Крокодил Данди 2	Australia	1988	45,800,000	

== See also ==
- Cinema of the Soviet Union
- List of highest-grossing films
- List of highest-grossing films in Russia
- List of highest-grossing Indian films
- List of highest-grossing Indian films in overseas markets
- List of highest-grossing non-English films
- Lists of highest-grossing films
