= List of Egyptian films of 1970 =

A list of films produced in Egypt in 1970. For an A-Z list of films currently on Wikipedia, see Category:Egyptian films.

Title	Director	Cast	Genre	Notes
Imra’at Zawgy (My Husband’s Wife)	Mahmoud Zulfikar	Salah Zulfikar, Nelly, Naglaa Fathi	Romantic comedy	
Harami El Waraka (Lottery Ticket Thief)	Ali Reda	Mahmoud Reda, Naglaa Fathi, Farida Fahmy		
Borj El-Athraa (Virgo)	Mahmoud Zulfikar	Salah Zulfikar, Nahed Sherif, Adel Emam, Lebleba	Comedy	
Ghoroub We Shorouq (Sunset and Sunrise)	Kamal El Sheikh	Soad Hosny, Salah Zulfikar, Rushdy Abaza, Mahmoud El-Meliguy	Political thriller	
Nar el shouq		Sabah, Rushdy Abaza, Howaida, Hussein Fahmy	Drama	
Ein Al Hayah (Eye of Life)	Ibrahim El Shaqanqeery	Salah Zulfikar, Samira Ahmed, Amal Zayed	Action	
