= Unfinished Story =

1955 soviet film

- Russian: Неоконченная повесть
- Directed by: Fridrikh Ermler
- Written by: Konstantin Isaev
- Produced by: Tamara Samoznayeva
- Starring: Elina Bystritskaya; Sergey Bondarchuk
- Cinematography: Anatoli Nazarov
- Music by: Gavriil Popov
- Production company: Lenfilm
- Release date: October 17, 1955
- Running time: 100 min.
- Country: Soviet Union
- Language: Russian

Unfinished Story (Russian: Неоконченная повесть, romanized: Neokonchennaya povest) is a 1955 Soviet romantic drama film directed by Fridrikh Ermler.

== Plot ==
The local doctor Yelizaveta Maksimovna is a beautiful woman and a wonderful sympathetic person. She is lonely, although she is cared for by a confident and promising colleague. Yelizaveta Maksimovna has one patient, a manly, full-energy ship builder Yershov, chained to the bed with a paralysis of both legs.

All doctors recommend him rest, and Elizaveta Maksimovna advises to work and not feel sorry for herself. Yershov with all his heart falls in love with his doctor, and she loves him, but she does not dare to say her feelings, Ershov thinks that he has no hopes.

== Cast ==
- Elina Bystritskaya as Yelizaveta Muromtseva
- Sergey Bondarchuk as Yuri Yershov
- Sofia Giatsintova as Anna Yershova, Yuri's Mother
- Yevgeny Samoylov as Aleksandr Aganin
- Yevgeni Lebedev as Fyodor Ivanovich
- Aleksandr Larikov as Grandpa Spirin
- German Khovanov as Vasili Spirin
- Yuri Tolubeyev as Nikolai Sladkov
- Erast Garin as Koloskov
- Antonina Bogdanova as Aunt Polya
- Vladimir Voronov as Ponomaryov
- Boris Leskin as patient simulator

== Release ==
Fridrikh Ermler's film watched 29.3 million viewers, which is 406 results in the history of Soviet film distribution.

== Criticism ==
Éric Rohmer wrote in 1959: The Unfinished Story is not a production without finds. Ermler lacks Barnet's sense of humor or Donskoy's pictorial skill, but some episodes of his painting are excellent examples of Russian school cinema: inept courtship of a doctor colleague, a family feast, a night meeting with singing students. The Soviets should have stuck to this warm everyday intonation, developed it — although, to tell the truth, they never abandoned it.
