= My Husband's Wife (film) =

My Husband’s Wife
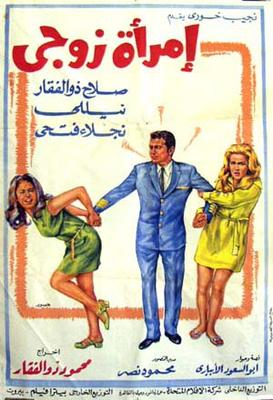
- Theatrical poster
- Original title: امرأة زوجي
- Directed by: Mahmoud Zulfikar
- Written by: Abo El Seoud El Ebiary
- Produced by: Naguib Knoury
- Starring: Salah Zulfikar; Naglaa Fathi; Nelly
- Cinematography: Mohsen Nasr
- Music by: Fathy Qourra; Mounir Mourad
- Distributed by: Naguib Khoury
- Release date: April 27, 1970
- Running time: 110 minutes
- Country: Egypt
- Language: Egyptian Arabic

My Husband’s Wife also known as My Husband’s Woman (Arabic: امرأة زوجي, Imra’at Zawgi or Emra'at Zawgy) is a 1970 Egyptian drama film written by Abo El Seoud El Ebiary and directed by Mahmoud Zulfikar. It stars Salah Zulfikar, Nelly and Naglaa Fathi.

== Plot ==
Samia and Adel are a happily married couple, but her friend Nani tricks Samia by telling her that she is sick.

Samia is convinced, undergoes tests and learns that she is about to die. Deciding to ensure her husband will be cared for, she chooses a new wife for him.

She does everything she can to bring the new wife and her husband closer, so that she can be assured of his future afterwards.

== Cast ==
- Salah Zulfikar: Adel
- Nelly: Samia
- Naglaa Fathi: Wafaa
- Hassan Mustafa: Mamdouh
- Mimi Gamal: Nany
- Hussein Ismail: Wafaa’s father
- Laila Yousry: Haneya
- Mukhtar Al Sayed: Waiter

== See also ==
- Salah Zulfikar filmography
- List of Egyptian films of 1970
- List of Egyptian films of the 1970s
