= Ghroob Wa Shrooq =

Sunset and Sunrise
- Arabic: غروب وشروق
- Directed by: Kamal El Sheikh
- Written by: Gamal Hammad
- Screenplay by: Raafat El Mihy
- Produced by: Gerges Fawzi; Hassan Ramzi
- Starring: Soad Hosny; Salah Zulfikar; Rushdy Abaza
- Cinematography: Kamal Karim
- Edited by: Said El Sheikh
- Music by: Andre Ryder
- Production companies: General Egyptian Corporation for Cinema and Television
- Distributed by: General Egyptian Corporation for Cinema and Television
- Release date: March 16, 1970
- Running time: 125 minutes
- Country: Egypt
- Language: Egyptian Arabic

Ghroob Wa Shrooq or Sunset and Sunrise (Arabic: غروب وشروق) is 1970 Egyptian political film directed by Kamal El Sheikh and written by Gamal Hammad. It stars Soad Hosny, Salah Zulfikar, Rushdy Abaza and Mahmoud El-Meliguy. The film is listed in the Top 100 films in the history of the Egyptian cinema.

== Plot ==
The events occur in early 1952 where secret patriotic organizations are rising all over the country. One of these organizations is headed by Amin Akef with the aim of overthrowing the King and his associates including Azmi Pasha the head of the political police. Amin is a pilot who has two best friends, Essam and Samir. Samir is married to Madiha who is the daughter of Azmi Pasha. She imagines that she can live outside of her father's control, so she asks her husband to live alone outside the palace walls, but Azmi Pasha refuses.

After the Cairo fire was extinguished in January 1952. Azmi Pasha reassures that the situation has been controlled and that there is no danger. Then a quarrel occurs between Madiha and Samir because he could not persuade the father to leave the palace. Madiha gets bored as a result of her husband's travel on one of his trips. She calls anonymously one of Samir’s friends by phone. He is Essam, who she knows has many women's adventures, and at first she imagines that it is a kind of change to the boredom and monotony of her life. She goes to him in his apartment, Essam leaves her to buy some household supplies, but a car hits him, and he is taken to the hospital, and he searches for one of his friends to save the woman inside his apartment, Amin was busy and unfortunately, only Samir was available to help, who arrived at the hospital and Essam tells him what happened and asks him to release this woman, without knowing that she is his wife, at home Samir is stunned by finding his wife in his best friend’s apartment, he divorces her after he attacks her in front of her father, who plots an accident to kill Samir.

Essam and Amin feel the shock of their friend’s assassination. At a time when they were mourning their best friend, Azmi Pasha begins to try to pressure Essam to marry his daughter Madiha to try to avoid the scandal. Amin finds it a great opportunity to penetrate Azmi Pasha’s palace and indeed, Essam marries Madiha and lives in the palace.

From the Pasha's safe. Essam delivers Azmi Pasha’s secrets to the patriotic organization. Amin prints it in the form of Azmi Pasha's mémoire and distributed it everywhere even in the Saray, and the Saray demands that he submit his resignation. Azmi Pasha tries to hit the elements opposed to him through Essam and Amin, but he does not succeed. Azmi Pasha is arrested, and during the farewell, Essam tells Madiha how much he loves her, but she asks that they be separated forever. He leaves with Amin and organize their next meeting in their patriotic organization.

== Primary cast ==
- Soad Hosny: Madiha
- Salah Zulfikar: Amin Akef
- Rushdy Abaza: Essam
- Mahmoud El-Meliguy: Azmi Pasha
- Ibrahim Khan: Samir
- Mohamed El-Dafrawi: Farid Makram
- Salah Nazmi: Police officer
- Kamal Yassin: Ashraf El-Buhairi
- Nadia Saif Al-Nasr: Sharifa Hanim
- Helmy Helali: Member of the organization
- Hassan Atlé: Worker in the palace
- Mimi Gamal: Essam’s friend
- Zizi Mustafa: Essam’s friend
- Rabab: Amin’s friend
- Gazebeya Fouad
- Adawy Ghaith

== See also ==
- Karnak
- The Man Who Lost His Shadow
- Chitchat on the Nile
- List of Egyptian films of 1970
