= Al-Ridaʼ al-Abyaḍ =

1975 film

- Directed by: Hassan Ramzi
- Starring: Naglaa Fathi; Ahmed Mazhar; Magdi Wahba
- Release date: 1975
- Country: Egypt
- Language: Egyptian Arabic
- Box office: 61 million tickets (USSR)

Al-Ridaʼ al-Abyaḍ (Arabic: الرداء الابيض), known as The White Gown in English, is a 1975 Egyptian Arabic-language Egyptian film directed by Hassan Ramzi and co-written by Nairuz Abdel Malek. It sold 61 million tickets in the Soviet Union, making it the seventh highest-grossing foreign film ever in the Soviet Union and the highest-grossing Egyptian film of all time.

== Plot ==
Omar Bey's son Kamal fell in love and married a lady called Dalal. The marriage by Kamal was not approved by his father. Kamal died in an accident. His father Omar Bey drove Dalal out of the house after the death of her husband and took up responsibility of looking after her daughter. Later on, Dalal decides to steal from Omar Bay to buy some gifts for her daughter.

== Cast ==
- Naglaa Fathi
- Ahmed Mazhar
- Magdi Wahba
- Youssef Wahbi
- Zahret El-Ola
- Khaled Aanous
- Hassan Afifi
- Layla Fahmy
- Badriya Abdel Gawad
- Hayat Kandel
- Hussein Kandil
- Khadija Mahmoud
- Manal
- Salah Nazmi
- Hoda Ramzi

== Box office ==
The film was released in the Soviet Union in 1976, selling 61 million tickets in the country. This made it the highest-grossing foreign film of the year and the seventh highest-grossing foreign film ever in the Soviet Union. This also made it the highest-grossing Egyptian film of all time, with its Soviet ticket sales surpassing the worldwide ticket sales of all other Egyptian films.

== See also ==
- List of highest-grossing films in the Soviet Union
- Egyptian cinema
- List of Egyptian films of the 1970s
- List of Egyptian films of 1975
- Salah Zulfikar filmography
- Soad Hosny filmography
