= 1951 in Japan =

- Decades: 1930s; 1940s; 1950s; 1960s; 1970s
- See also: Other events of 1951; History of Japan • Timeline • Years

Events in the year 1951 in Japan.

== Incumbents ==
- Emperor: Hirohito
- Prime Minister: Shigeru Yoshida
- Chief Cabinet Secretary: Katsuo Okazaki until December 26, Shigeru Hori
- Chief Justice of the Supreme Court: Kōtarō Tanaka
- President of the House of Representatives: Kijūrō Shidehara until March 10, Jōji Hayashi from March 13
- President of the House of Councillors: Naotake Satō

=== Governors ===
- Aichi Prefecture: Hideo Aoyagi (until 4 April); Mikine Kuwahara (starting 11 May)
- Akita Prefecture: Kosaku Hasuike (until 4 April); Tokuji Ikeda (starting 30 April)
- Aomori Prefecture: Bunji Tsushima
- Chiba Prefecture: Hitoshi Shibata
- Ehime Prefecture: Juushin Aoki (until 4 April); Sadatake Hisamatsu (starting 4 May)
- Fukui Prefecture: Harukazu Obata
- Fukuoka Prefecture: Katsuji Sugimoto
- Fukushima Prefecture: Sakuma Ootake
- Gifu Prefecture: Kamon Muto
- Gunma Prefecture: Yoshio Iyoku
- Hiroshima Prefecture: vacant (until 24 January); Hiroo Ōhara (starting 24 January)
- Hokkaido Prefecture: Toshifumi Tanaka
- Hyogo Prefecture: Yukio Kishida
- Ibaraki Prefecture: Yoji Tomosue
- Ishikawa Prefecture: Wakio Shibano
- Iwate Prefecture: Kenkichi Kokubun
- Kagawa Prefecture: Masanori Kaneko
- Kagoshima Prefecture: Kaku Shigenari
- Kanagawa Prefecture: Iwataro Uchiyama
- Kochi Prefecture: Wakaji Kawamura
- Kumamoto Prefecture: Saburō Sakurai
- Kyoto Prefecture: Atsushi Kimura
- Mie Prefecture: Masaru Aoki
- Miyagi Prefecture: Kazuji Sasaki
- Miyazaki Prefecture: Tadao Annaka
- Nagano Prefecture: Torao Hayashi
- Nagasaki Prefecture: Sōjirō Sugiyama (until 26 May); Takejirō Nishioka (starting 26 May)
- Nara Prefecture: Mansaku Nomura (until 14 April); Ryozo Okuda (starting 30 April)
- Niigata Prefecture: Shohei Okada
- Oita Prefecture: Tokuju Hosoda
- Okayama Prefecture: Hirokichi Nishioka (until 30 March); Yukiharu Miki (starting 3 May)
- Osaka Prefecture: Bunzō Akama
- Saga Prefecture: Gen'ichi Okimori (until 4 April); Naotsugu Nabeshima (starting 4 April)
- Saitama Prefecture: Yuuichi Oosawa
- Shiga Prefecture: Iwakichi Hattori
- Shiname Prefecture: Fujiro Hara (until 4 April); Yasuo Tsunematsu (starting 4 May)
- Shizuoka Prefecture: Takeji Kobayashi (until 4 April); Toshio Saitō (starting 4 April)
- Tochigi Prefecture: Juukichi Kodaira (until 1 April); Goro Abe (starting 4 April)
- Tokushima Prefecture: Goro Abe
- Tokyo Prefecture: Seiichirō Yasui
- Tottori Prefecture: Aiji Nishio
- Toyama Prefecture: Kunitake Takatsuji
- Wakayama Prefecture: Shinji Ono
- Yamagata Prefecture: Michio Murayama
- Yamaguchi Prefecture: Tatsuo Tanaka
- Yamanashi Prefecture: Katsuyasu Yoshie (until 4 April); Hisashi Amano (starting 30 April)

== Events ==
- April 24 – Sakuragichō train fire
- May 19 – According to Japan Fire and Disaster Management Agency official confirmed report, a fire in Ohara Cinema in Hamanaka, Hokkaido, the death toll number was 42.
- July 11 – According to Japan Fire and Disaster Management Agency official confirmed report, a torrential heavy massive rain, affective Heiwa Lake collapsed in Kameoka, Kyoto Prefecture, killing 117 persons.
- July 15 – According to National Police Agency of Japan official confirmed report, an extra bus plunge into Tenryu River, Urakawa Town, (now Tenryu-ku, Hamamatsu), Shizuoka Prefecture, official death toll is 28 persons.
- September 15 – An extreme Typhoon Ruth, a flood swept and landslide occur in Iwakuni area, Yamaguchi Prefecture, tidal wave hit in Satsunan Islands, according to Japanese government official confirmed report, in total 943 persons were killed, 2644 persons were wounded.
- November 3 – During a regular route bus running, following caught fire in Uno Town (now Seiyo), Ehime Prefecture, 33 persons were perished, according to NPAJ confirmed report.
- Unknown date – Japan National Mutual Insurance Federation of Agricultural Corporatives (JA Kyosai) was founded.

== Films ==
- Early Summer

== Births ==
- January 8 – Yoshinori Monta, singer-songwriter
- January 19 – Shimon Sakaguchi, immunologist, winner of the Nobel Prize in Physiology or Medicine
- February 5 – Ryūsei Nakao, actor, singer and voice actor
- February 16 – Yumi Takigawa, actress
- March 3 – Heizō Takenaka, economist
- March 4 – Linda Yamamoto, pop star
- March 25 – Jumbo Tsuruta, professional wrestler (d. 2000)
- April 8 – Kaori Momoi, actress
- May 15 – Yoshifumi Hibako, general
- May 16 – Unshō Ishizuka, voice actor (d. 2018)
- August 8 – Mamoru Oshii, film director
- August 11 – Katsumi Chō, voice actor
- October 7 – Natsuo Kirino, novelist and writer
- October 8 – Maki Kaji, populariser of Sudoku (d. 2021)
- November 5 – Mari Amachi, singer and actress
- December 20 – Shigeru Suzuki, musician, songwriter and guitarist
- December 26 – Ginzō Matsuo, voice actor (d. 2001)

== Deaths ==
- January 21 – Yuriko Miyamoto, novelist
- March 10 – Kijūrō Shidehara, Prime minister of Japan
- May 17 – Empress Teimei, Empress consort of Emperor Taishō
- June 11 – Takuma Nishimura

== See also ==
- List of Japanese films of 1951
