= Woman's Secret =

- Egyptian Arabic: سر امرأة
- Directed by: Atef Salem
- Written by: Raphael Jabbour- (story); Yousef Eisa (screenplay and dialogue)
- Produced by: A. Jabbour
- Starring: Huda Sultan; Salah Zulfikar; Emad Hamdy
- Cinematography: Bruno Salvi
- Edited by: Saeed El-Sheikh
- Music by: Andre Ryder
- Production company: Sun Films
- Distributed by: Nahdet el-Sharq Films
- Release date: October 17, 1960 (Egypt)
- Running time: 110 minutes
- Country: Egypt
- Language: Egyptian Arabic

Woman's Secret (Arabic: سر امرأة, translit. Serr Imra'a or Serr emraa) is an Egyptian film released in 1960. The film is directed by Atef Salem. It stars Huda Sultan, Salah Zulfikar, and Emad Hamdy.

== Synopsis ==
A man fed up with the monotony of his marriage looks for someone new. Fate leads him to a dancer, who visits him one day at his home only to find him murdered. During the investigation, the police discovery that she is supported by her brother, who defends her from suspicion by trying to find the real culprit.

== Cast ==
- Huda Sultan as Fathia Ahmed Hassan
- Salah Zulfikar as Ahmed
- Emad Hamdy as Raouf Adham
- Aida Helal as Rawheya
- Omar El-Hariri as Rashed Hussein
- Nagwa Fouad as Sonya
- Saeed Khalil as prosecutor
- Nazim Shaarawy as judge
- Victoria Hobeika as Labiba Tanios Gibran
- Abbas Rahmi as forensic pathologist
- Nabil el-Alfi as Adel Raafat
- Ahmed Louxor as investigating officer
- Abdel Moneim Saudi as Hafez
- Mimi Gamal as young Fathia
- Abdel-Azim Kamel as forensic lab technician
- Ibrahim Heshmat as doctor
