= List of Soviet films of 1951 =

A list of films produced in the Soviet Union in 1951 (see 1951 in film).

== 1951 ==
Title	Russian title	Director	Cast	Genre	Notes
1951
Belinsky	Белинский	Grigori Kozintsev	Sergei Kurilov	Biopic	
Bountiful Summer	Щедрое лето	Boris Barnet	Nina Arkhipova, Nikolay Kryuchkov	Comedy drama	
Dream of a Cossack	Кавалер Золотой Звезды	Yuli Raizman	Sergei Bondarchuk	Drama	Entered into the 1951 Cannes Film Festival
Farewell, America	Прощай, Америка!	Aleksandr Dovzhenko	Liliya Gritsenko	Drama	
The Night Before Christmas	Ночь перед Рождеством	Valentina and Zinaida Brumberg	Mikhail Yanshin	Animation	
The Miners of Donetsk	Донецкие шахтёры	Leonid Lukov	Aleksei Gribov, A. Mansvetov, G. Pasechnik, Viktor Khokhryakov, Mikheil Gelovani	Drama	
Przhevalsky	Пржевальский	Sergei Yutkevich	Vsevolod Larionov	Drama	
Sporting Honour	Спортивная честь	Vladimir Petrov	Alexey Gribov, Nikolai Kryuchkov	Sports	
Taras Shevchenko		Aleksandr Alov, Vladimir Naumov, Igor Savchenko	Sergei Bondarchuk, Ivan Pereverzev	Historical	
The Village Doctor	Сельский врач	Sergei Gerasimov	Tamara Makarova	Drama	

== See also ==
- 1951 in the Soviet Union
