= Yesenia (film) =

- Directed by: Alfredo B. Crevenna
- Screenplay by: Julio Alejandro; Yolanda Vargas Dulché
- Story by: Yolanda Vargas Dulché
- Starring: Jacqueline Andere; Jorge Lavat
- Cinematography: José Ortiz Ramos
- Edited by: Jorge Busto
- Music by: Sergio Guerrero
- Release date: 11 September 1971 (Mexico)
- Running time: 121 minutes
- Country: Mexico
- Language: Spanish
- Box office: 91.4 million tickets (Soviet Union)

Yesenia is a 1971 Mexican film directed by Alfredo B. Crevenna, based on an original story by Yolanda Vargas Dulché. The film stars Jacqueline Andere as the titular character, along with Jorge Lavat. Yesenia was a blockbuster in the Soviet Union, where it sold 91.4 million tickets and became the highest-grossing foreign film in the Soviet Union. It was also a box office success in China. Due to this success abroad, it ranks among the world's non-English language films with the highest attendance record.

== Plot ==
Yesenia is a woman who grew up among gypsies. She works as a traditional performer, gaining money for dances, fortune telling and palmistry; she also occasionally steals money to make ends meet and support her family. She is close with Bardo, a violin player who tells her there is a woman he loves. During the conversation she brings up a golden necklace which she has worn since birth because it brings her luck.

At the same time there is an identical golden necklace worn by Luisita, a young woman who is at a family reunion where her mother and grandfather do not talk to each other. Yesenia reads the hands of soldiers at a café and when one of them, Oswaldo, refuses to pay her (and forcibly kisses her) she makes off with his money. Inside the moneybag was an important piece of paper listing the names and locations of arms dealers. Oswaldo returns to the Gypsy village and promises they can keep the money if they give back the paper.

After several days of Oswaldo waiting at the agreed vantage point, Yesenia shows up only for Oswaldo to then sexually assault her. Thinking she has killed him after striking back, she stays at his side, returns him the money and they kiss. They then become a couple with Yesenia insisting that it must be a secret given that her folks won't accept a white man. Some of her friends find out anyways and tell her that they were abandoned by their white boyfriends.

Yesenia's Gypsy mother in her dying breaths tells her grandmother to keep the true nature of her birth a secret. After her funeral, Oswaldo returns to the village and gets in a knife fight with Bardo. Since Yesenia is not a real Gypsy, the village elder allows them to get married under a traditional Gypsy wedding. They both carve an X into their wrists to symbolize their marriage, but do not register it officially.

Oswaldo gets Yesenia a room at a nice hotel, only for her to be refused service and harassed by both the employees and the guests when she goes to the cafeteria as she is a gypsy woman. She starts throwing plates and it snowballs into a fight with everyone in the cafeteria which she just sits back and watches. Ejected from the hotel, Yesenia moves into a nice house with Oswaldo. He helps her to dress like those in this Christian community and she notices a painting on the wall that is identical to her necklace; Oswaldo tells her it is the Virgin Mary. Meanwhile, Luisita's family is talking about how she has a heart disease that could kill her if she is in emotional distress.

Oswaldo is given a reconnaissance assignment and told not to tell anyone. On the way he is captured by partisans and jailed. He tries to contact home but is rebuffed. Bardo tries to convince Yesenia she was abandoned and to come home with him, but she insists that she loves Oswaldo and continues to have fantasies with him.

The military frees Oswaldo only for him to completely forget about Yesenia and make no effort to return to her. He instead courts Luisita, teaching her to ride a horse, only for her to fall off. She falls in love with him. He doesn't really like her, but her family reminds him of her heart condition and he keeps seeing her.

Eventually Oswaldo and Yesenia cross paths at a public place. He tries explaining himself, but suddenly Bardo threatens him with death if he approaches her again. The wedding of Oswaldo and Luisita nears, and Yesenia's grandmother gets drunk and tells her about the real circumstances surrounding her birth.

Yesenia's biological mother had a child out of wedlock, and her father forced her to give her newborn child to who Yesenia believed was her grandmother. She goes to the house where they are all living, even though Bardo claims that will separate them forever. She meets her biological mother who emotionally explains everything, including telling her that Luisita is her sister, but Yesenia is unfazed. Oswaldo just happens to be there during these scenes and they reconcile. Luisita is initially happy and welcoming, but that same night runs out the door in distress. Their grandfather makes multiple attempts to apologize to Yesenia for abandoning her.

The last scene is Oswaldo's Christian wedding. The attendees are convinced it is Luisita but it turns out to be Yesenia.

== Cast ==
- Jacqueline Andere as Yesenia
- Jorge Lavat as Osvaldo
- Irma Lozano as Luisa
- Isabela Corona as Abuela

== See also ==
- Yesenia (1970 TV series)
- Yesenia (1987 TV series)
- List of highest-grossing non-English films
- List of highest-grossing films in the Soviet Union
- List of highest-grossing Mexican films
