= The Age of Innocence (1976 film) =

1976 film by Vladimir Rogovoy

- Poster
- Directed by: Vladimir Rogovoy
- Written by: Eduard Topol
- Starring: Vladimir Letenkov; Stanislav Zhdanko; Leonid Kayurov; Pavel Nikolai
- Cinematography: Inna Zarafyan
- Edited by: Olga Katusheva
- Music by: Rafail Khozak
- Production company: Gorky Film Studio
- Release date: 1976
- Running time: 84 minutes
- Country: Soviet Union
- Language: Russian

The Age of Innocence (Russian: Несовершеннолетние, romanized: Nesovershennoletnie, also called Minors) is a 1976 Soviet film directed by Vladimir Rogovoy and written by Edward Topol. It is not based on the novel The Age of Innocence, instead being a juvenile delinquency film set in the contemporary Soviet Union.

Russian teenager Zhenya Prokhorov returns home from military service and his friend Kostya from a corrective labor colony. They try to stay out of trouble and find a place in the world.

== Plot ==
Two friends return to their hometown at the same time: Zhenya from the army and Kostya from a correctional colony, where he served time for a drunken brawl. Together, they confront a gang of hooligans who extort money from children and rob drunken passersby. After a few scuffles, Zhenya realizes that fighting alone won’t solve the problem, especially as he notices his 11-year-old nephew, Shurka, beginning to fall under the gang's influence.

During one encounter, instead of engaging in another fight, Zhenya suggests the gang members join a boxing club where Kostya works as a coach. Some of the boys take up the offer, distancing themselves from Gogol, the cynical and manipulative leader of the gang.

Polina Borisovna, Zhenya's mother, who teaches chemistry and biology at the local school, refuses to give Gogol a passing grade on his mandatory chemistry exam, which results in him failing to receive his high school diploma. Furious, Gogol and his friends vandalize the school's greenhouse, a project dear to Polina, as students had built it over six years. Zhenya confronts Gogol, who threatens him with a “rose” – the jagged neck of a broken bottle. Nevertheless, Zhenya, a former paratrooper, emerges victorious and brings Gogol to the police.

In the final scene, a police major convinces Zhenya to dedicate his life to working with young people, believing Zhenya has a natural talent for guiding youth.

== Cast ==
- Vladimir Letenkov as Zhenya Prokhorov
- Stanislav Zhdanko as Kostya Sila
- Leonid Kayurov as "Gogol"
- Pavel Nikolai as Shurik
- Nikolay Muravyov as police major
- Vera Vasilyeva as Polina Borisovna, teacher, Zhenya's mother
- Yuri Medvedev as policeman Kuvaev
- Igor Oshotin as Alka
- Nadezhda Rumyantseva as Alka's mother
- Yuri Kuzmenkov as Alka's father, an alcoholic

== Reception ==
The Soviet journal Iskusstvo Kino gave The Age of Innocence a negative review.

It was the highest-grossing film in the Soviet Union for 1977, with 44.6 million tickets sold.
