= Hamdi Qandil =

Egyptian journalist

- Born: 1936; Cairo, Egypt
- Died: 31 October 2018 (aged 81–82); Cairo, Egypt
- Education: University of Alexandria (1952); Cairo University-Qasr El-Ainy Faculty of Medicine (1953–1956)
- Occupations: Journalist, newsman, talk show host, political activist
- Years active: 1956–2018
- Known for: News talk shows Aqwal al-Suhf ("In the Press"), Ra'is el-Tahrir ("Editor-in-Chief") and Qalam Rosas ("Pencil"); Columns in Akher Sa'a and other Egyptian publications
- Television: Egyptian television and Dream TV (1961–1969, 1998–2003); Dubai TV (2004–2008); Al-Libia (2008)
- Movement: National Association for Change (February–June 2010); Egyptian Popular Current (September 2012–2018)
- Spouse: Naglaa Fathi

Hamdi Qandil (Arabic: حمدي قنديل Ḥamdī Qandīl, also Romanized Qandeel or Kandil; 1936 – 31 October 2018) was a prominent Egyptian journalist, news anchor, talk show host and activist. Qandil started his journalism career in the 1950s when he wrote for the Akher Sa'a ("Last Hour") magazine at the invitation of veteran journalist Mustafa Amin. In 1961 he began broadcasting a news show called Aqwal al-Suhuf ("In the Press") until 1969 when he was appointed director of the Arab Broadcasting Studios Union. In 1971 he left his post in protest at a government inspection of his technical staff. He later worked with UNESCO from 1974 to 1986, specializing in the field of international media. In 1987 he co-founded a satellite broadcasting company that later became known as MBC, where he worked for three months before leaving because of political differences with its management. Qandil briefly presented the show Ma'a Hamdi Qandil ("With Hamdi Qandil") for ART, but left amid disagreements between him and his managers regarding Qandil's planned interviews with Muammar Gaddafi and Tariq Aziz.

He returned to Egyptian television in 1998, hosting the current affairs and press review talk show Ra'is el-Tahrir ("Editor-in-Chief"). The program became one of the most popular and respected in Egypt. After apparent trouble with the state censors, Qandil moved the show to Dubai TV in 2004 under the name Qalam Rosas ("Pencil"). The new program was highly watched throughout the Arab world. He was forced to quit Dubai TV after criticizing Arab governments and subsequently hosted the show on the Libyan channel Al-Libiya for two months before the Libyan government cancelled it. He returned to Egypt and wrote for the Al-Masry Al-Youm newspaper and then Al-Shorouk, but his association with the latter ended as a result of a libel suit brought on by then-Egyptian foreign minister Ahmed Aboul Gheit in response to a column critical of Egyptian foreign policy written by Qandil in May 2010. The case was later dropped following the 2011 Egyptian Revolution.

Qandil was well known for his pan-Arabist discourse and fierce criticism of the Egyptian and other Arab governments. According to Al-Ahram Center for Political and Strategic Studies political analyst Diaa Rashwan, Qandil "is a great Egyptian journalist and highly credible, he is bold and gives constructive criticism ... people listen to him and take what he says seriously, which is why he poses a threat" to the government. Prior to the Egyptian revolution, Qandil co-founded the National Association for Change, a reformist group headed by Mohamed ElBaradei. From September 2012, Qandil had lent his support to the Egyptian Popular Current opposition movement.

== Early life ==
=== Childhood ===
Qandil was born in Cairo in 1936 to a father from Menoufia. He was the eldest of five children. Qandil spent much of his childhood and had his primary schooling in the Nile Delta city of Tanta. His father had moved the middle-income family to that city, where he owned a few feddans of land mostly planted with pears and grapes. Qandil's father primarily distributed them to neighbors and others close to him.

During Qandil's boyhood, he borrowed and read books from a medical practice and a culture and sporting association in Tanta on a near weekly basis. He also learned field hockey there. Qandil was at the top of his class throughout his later school years and initially sought to enter the medical profession, a typical career aspiration for students with high marks. His mother particularly encouraged him to become a doctor. Qandil simultaneously took an interest in writing, Arabic calligraphy and foreign languages.

=== Journalism career and education ===
Qandil was introduced to journalism when he began writing a secondary school research paper. During that time, he also wrote an article for the low-budget Tanta newspaper Al Ikhlas, criticizing King Farouk for spending one million pounds from the treasury to purchase a yacht called the "Mahrousa". He was fired soon after, but had since grown fond of journalism. Due to this new interest and his father's increasingly poor health, Qandil did not complete the first stage of his medical studies, causing his 1952 application to medical school to be rejected. He instead enrolled in the department of geology at Alexandria University. In July of that year, King Farouk was overthrown by a group of dissenting officers led by Gamal Abdel Nasser, leading to the subsequent establishment of a republican system under the presidency of leading officer Muhammad Naguib.

Qandil spent two months studying geology and decided to retake his high school examinations in order to enter into medical school. He performed well and was admitted to Cairo University's Qasr El-Ainy Faculty of Medicine in 1953. He continued in his studies until 1956, by which time Nasser had become president. During this period he also joined the National Guard. Together with some of his fellow students he founded his college's official magazine, which they printed through the Akhbar el-Yom publishing house. The magazine's first edition was confiscated due to an article Qandil wrote that was critical of university professors and regulations. Shortly after completing his final exams in 1956, Qandil was offered a writing position with Akher Sa'a ("Last Hour") magazine by its owners, the prominent journalists and brothers Mustafa Amin and Ali Amin. Mustafa employed Qandil with a salary of 15 Egyptian pounds and initially tasked him with writing the horoscope and a column that responded to letters from readers. Qandil was asked by Amin to serve as an editor for Akher Sa'a in 1961.

That year Qandil also attended the International Union of Students in Prague, Czechoslovakia, where he met Yasser Arafat, then the head of the General Union of Palestinian Students. Later in 1956 Qandil was accepted into the department of journalism, obtaining a license (bachelor's degree) in journalism in 1960. Four years later he received a diploma in journalism from the Berlin Institute. Throughout this period he wrote for the magazine Al-Tahrir, earning a salary of 25 Egyptian pounds, and also worked with Al-Jamahir magazine in Damascus.

== Career in television and the UN ==
In 1961 Qandil began to work in broadcast television as the presenter of the program Aqwal al-Suhf ("In the Press"). In 1966 he became a media adviser to a television studio in Jordan, a role which ended after six weeks; the single broadcast of Aqwal al-Suhuf in Jordan was met with consternation from the Jordanian royal government and after Qandil was notified of this disapproval, he immediately returned to Egypt where he continued presenting the program. His position in Aqwal al-Suhuf ended in 1969 with his appointment as director of the Arab Broadcasting Stations Union (ABSU).

In early May 1971 Qandil left the ABSU after refusing to launch a disciplinary investigation of the technical team that recorded the Labor Day speech given by Anwar Sadat, who became president following Nasser's death in 1970. He left at a time when numerous broadcasters and media personalities were removed from their positions during Sadat's Corrective Revolution. However, he briefly returned to television in 1973 to announce Egypt's claimed victory in the Yom Kippur War with Israel in October of that year.

Qandil was appointed manager of the Department of the Free Flow of Information and Communication Policies for UNESCO in 1974. In an interview with Al-Ahram Weekly, Qandil stated that while at UNESCO he "specialised in satellite communications and published several books and studies" dealing with global media and broadcasting. During this time he strongly pushed to include Palestine as a member and attempted to remove the United States, the United Kingdom and Singapore from the organization. According to his own account, he was also able to master the English and French languages, and gain experience in diplomacy. He left UNESCO in 1986.

Together with partners from Egypt and the Arab world, Qandil co-founded the Eastern Satellite Communications Company in 1987. Its main purpose was to serve broadcasting station that would target Arabic-speaking communities in the Western world and to counter what Qandil perceived as Western bias in global media. However, in 1992, as a result of financial difficulties the company was sold and subsequently became the Middle East Broadcasting Center (MBC). Qandil worked at MBC for roughly three months until he quit, citing political differences with the station's managers, who considered him a Nasserist. That same year, he was offered to host his own show at Arab Radio and Television (ART), but initially opted to work on a project setting up a private Egyptian station for Al-Ahram. The station was not launched and Qandil took up a position at ART in 1996 where he hosted his own show called With Hamdi Qandil. Qandil's arrangements to interview Libyan leader Muammar Gaddafi on the anniversary of the 1969 coup that brought him to power, and also Tariq Aziz, the vice president of Iraq at the time, aroused controversy among ART's managers. He quit thereafter.

=== Ra'is el-Tahrir and Qalam Rosas ===
In 1998 Qandil responded favorably to the invitation of Safwat El-Sherif, the Information Minister in Hosni Mubarak's government, to return to Egyptian television. In March his program Ra'is el-Tahrir ("Editor-in-Chief") began airing. Qandil stated he returned to Egyptian television because he felt he owed "a debt of gratitude to the institution that built my fame when I was in my twenties. Also, working in Egypt is more immediately rewarding than anywhere else." With the relaxation of media restrictions during this period, Ra'is el-Tahrir became one of the most popular and respected television programs in Egypt. Describing the relative freedom afforded to the media, Qandil stated in 2001 that the situation was an improvement from when he first began the program, but "as long as there remains a censor, we will continue to ask for more [freedom of expression]."

Ra'is el-Tahrir was intended to serve as a weekly review of the pan-Arab press, but in practice the program became a medium through which Qandil expressed his opinions on various issues confronting Egypt and the Arab world, views which he claimed were representative of the popular Egyptian sentiment. Al-Ahram Weekly′s Amina Elbandary wrote that during the show, Qandil spoke "in histrionic style, his commentary replete with daring questions and remarks. Viewers are fascinated by his apparent lack of inhibition."

In the wake of the Second Intifada, the Palestinian uprising against Israeli occupation that began in 2000, the show became dominated by the conflict, which Qandil generally regarded as a campaign of Israeli aggression. He frequently broadcast the Israeli military's actions during the Intifada and called for viewers to support the uprising and boycott Israeli products. Qandil responded to a query regarding his extensive coverage of the Intifada by saying, "How are news shows expected to react to events such as the Intifada? Are we supposed to keep silent?"

Ra'is el-Tahrir later moved to Dream TV, an Egypt-based television station. Qandil continued to express his frustrations regarding the Israel and the Intifada, the run-up to the invasion of Iraq, and what he perceived as the United States' maligned intentions for the Middle East. According to author and researcher Andrew Hammond, "The show's combination of current affairs, press reviews and talk-shows became the most talked-about television in Egypt since Al-Jazeera's al-Ittijah al-Mu'akis." His show on Dream TV was cancelled abruptly in early 2003 amid rumors that he had been crossing political red lines during his broadcasts, including stinging criticism of the government of Hosni Mubarak. This reasoning was dismissed by Dream TV manager Sanaa Mansour, who stated that Qandil had not been let go, was free to express himself and left the show without offering an explanation to management.

In 2004 Qandil moved to the United Arab Emirates (UAE) began hosting a program on Dubai TV called Qalam Rosas ("Pencil"). The program was virtually a continuation of Ra'is al-Tahrir, a highly watched show dealing with the Arab world's major political, economic and social affairs of the day. Qalam Rosas would normally open with Qandil interviewing an Arab intellectual and discussing a current event. The show would then continue to a round table discussion with other journalists analyzing various social and political events and movements concerning the citizens of the Arab world. At its closing, Qandil would summarize the show with a well-known maxim or saying. The London-based Arab Media Watch organization awarded Qandil the 2006 Media Accomplishment Award to commend him for his "creativity and participation in the media world" over the course of his five decade career. In 2008 Qandil was forced to leave Dubai TV for criticizing Arab leaders, while commending Hassan Nasrallah, the secretary-general of the Lebanese political party and paramilitary group Hezbollah.

After his departure from Dubai TV he entered into a contract with Al-Libia, although he only remained with the Libyan channel for two months. Qandil's show was cancelled when the state-owned Al Jamahiriya Radio's General Authority took control of the channel. There was no official reason for the cancellation, but Qandil stated it was because of "instructions from high-ranking Libyan officials due to pressures from Egypt". He was reportedly offered to present Qalam Rosas on the Hezbollah-linked Al-Manar TV in early 2009, but opted not to join citing an unclear situation regarding his contract with Al-Libia.

== Political activism and Aboul Gheit lawsuit ==
After his brief stint on Al-Libia, Qandil returned to Egypt to write for the newspaper Al-Masry Al-Youm in 2008 and later began writing for Al-Shorouk. He co-founded and served as the media spokesman for National Association for Change (NAC) headed by Mohamed ElBaradei in early 2010. The NAC's stated purpose is push for democratic and other reforms in Egypt. In May Egyptian foreign minister Ahmed Aboul Gheit brought a lawsuit for libel against Qandil in response to a critical column about Aboul Gheit and Egyptian foreign policy that Qandil wrote for Al-Shorouk, called "The Homeland’s Disgrace and that of the Citizen." In the column Qandil lambasted the contradictory statements made by Aboul Gheit and Egypt's ambassador to Israel, in which the latter said Israel was a friendly state, while Aboul Gheit had just previously stated that Israel was an enemy. Qandil wrote that the ambassador sought to cover up Aboul Gheit's statement, and that Aboul Gheit's words "usually ... fall from his mouth like droppings of a torn rubbish bag". The matter was transferred to the criminal court. His relationship with Al-Shorouk consequently ended as a result of the controversy.

In June 2010 Qandil quit his position as the NAC's media spokesman. He did not give an official reason for resigning, but was reportedly upset that ElBaradei was frequently outside of Egypt. In mid-December Qandil appeared in court and his defense team, which included his brother Assem and Gamal Eid requested that the "biased" court quit and that the case be transferred to a civil jurisdiction. On 24 January 2011 the court refused the referral and also refused to summon Aboul Gheit at the request of Qandil's defense team. On 25 January mass demonstrations demanding President Hosni Mubarak's downfall erupted across Egypt, eventually overthrowing the government, including Aboul Gheit, on 11 February. In April Aboul Gheit dropped the lawsuit. According to Hafez Abu Seada of the Egyptian Organization for Human Rights, the revolution was the clear reason Aboul Gheit withdrew the suit, and had it not occurred, "the court could have handed [Qandil] a prison sentence."

== Political views ==
Qandil described himself as a supporter of Nasserism, which he defined not as a political affiliation, but rather an ideal of "social justice" and "national liberation" that "goes beyond generation and class". He did not join any of Egypt's Nasserist political parties or organizations, but viewed the era of late president Nasser as a period in which his "generation was taught self-respect, national pride and the courage to stand up against the great powers". Qandil was described by Hammond as a "secular-nationalist ... embodying the 'conscience of the Arab nation'".

In a 1999 interview Qandil stated his view that the pan-Arab media was not able to counter what he perceived as the influence of Zionism in American media and that the state of Arab media reflected the state of stagnation in the Arab world in general. Qandil was vociferously opposed to United States foreign policy in the Middle East. He referred to the US invasion of Iraq in 2003 as the "biggest modern disaster for the Arabs since 1948," the year in which the newly established state of Israel defeated a coalition of Arab armies, causing a mass exodus of Palestinians from their homes.

Qandil supported the 2011 Egyptian revolution and called for Mubarak to step down from the start of the protests. In a lecture to students from the American University of Cairo in early March 2011, Qandil hailed the young protesters who started the revolution as "brave" and expressed hope that it would open an era of democracy and press freedom in Egypt. During the 2012 Egyptian presidential election, Qandil endorsed Nasserist candidate Hamdeen Sabahi after the Revolutionary Youth Coalition (RYC) announced their support for him. In late September 2012, during the post-revolution period in Egypt during Mohamed Morsi's presidency, Qandil announced his support for the Egyptian Popular Current movement founded by Sabahi. At the inaugural conference, Qandil stated that "a major political battle" would soon be launched for the next parliamentary elections and that Egypt's diverse make-up could never be changed.

== Personal life and death ==
Qandil met and married Egyptian actress Naglaa Fathi in 1992. He was married twice before. Fathi said of Qandil "He is the first man who has fascinated me. It is not easy to bewitch me, but he did. I feel like a student when I'm with him: I discover new qualities in him every day," while Qandil said he felt an "immediate chemical bond" with Naglaa.

Qandil died on 31 October 2018 after a long illness, aged 82.

== Bibliography ==
- Andrew, Hammond (2007). Popular Culture in the Arab World: Arts, Politics and the Media. American University of Cairo Press. ISBN 978-9774160547.
