= List of Japanese films of 1951 =

A list of films released in Japan in 1951 (see 1951 in film).

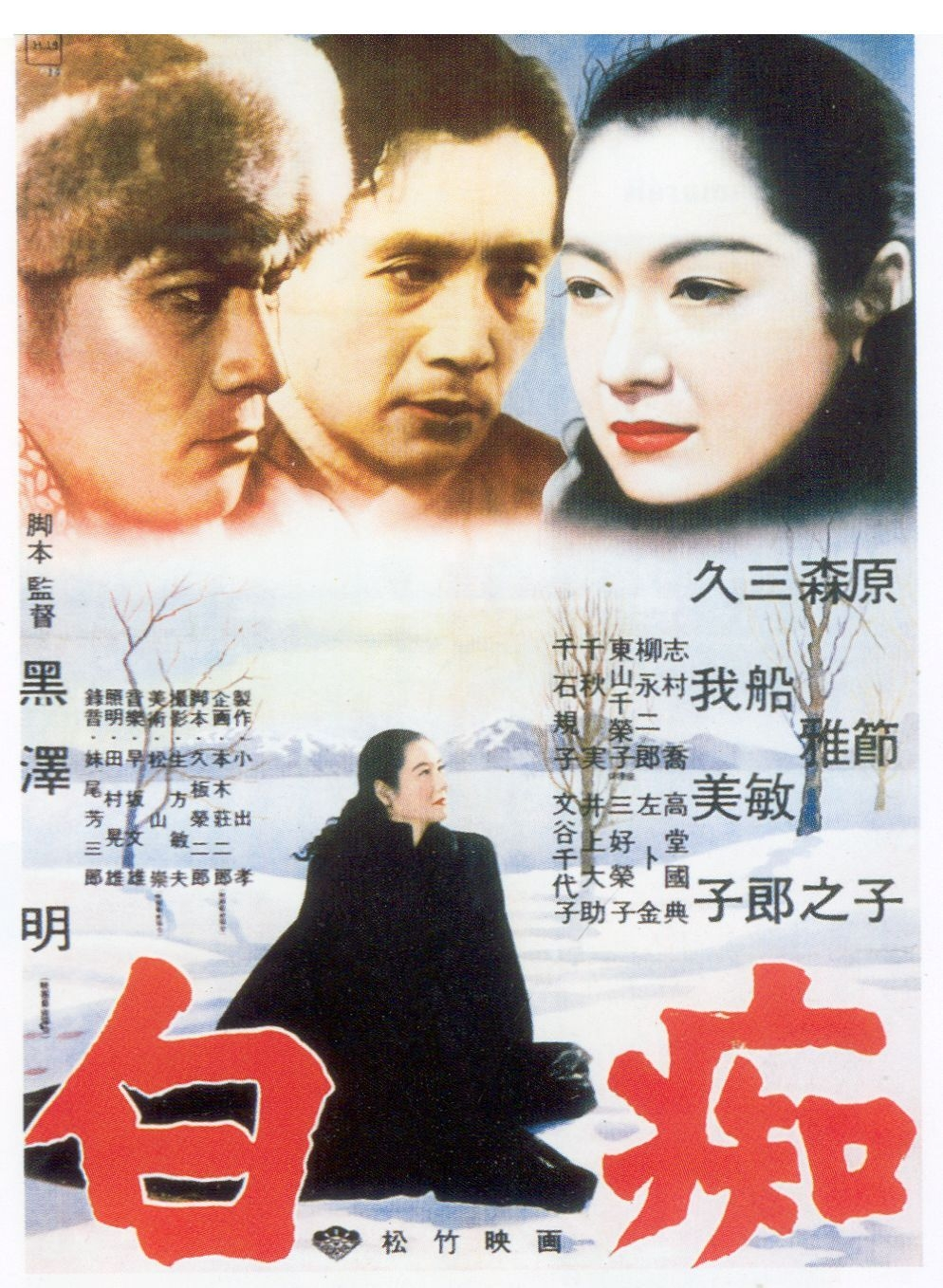
The Idiot

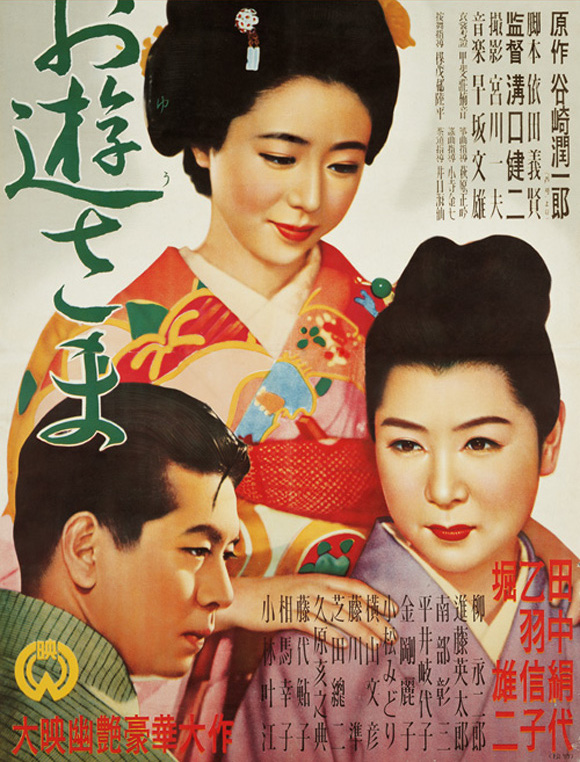
Miss Oyu

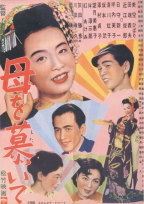
Yearning for Mother

| Title | Director | Cast | Genre | Notes |
|---|---|---|---|---|
| Beyond Love and Hate | Senkichi Taniguchi | Ryō Ikebe; Toshirō Mifune | | |
| Conclusion of Kojiro Sasaki-Duel at Ganryu Island | Hiroshi Inagaki | Tomoemon Otani; Toshirō Mifune | Jidaigeki | |
| Early Summer | Yasujirō Ozu | Setsuko Hara | Drama | |
| Elegy | Kajiro Yamamoto | Ken Uehara; Mieko Takamine | | |
| Ginza Cosmetics | Mikio Naruse | Kinuyo Tanaka; Ranko Hanai | Drama | |
| The Idiot | Akira Kurosawa | Masayuki Mori; Toshirō Mifune | Drama | |
| Koibito | Kon Ichikawa | Ryō Ikebe, Asami Kuji | Romance | |
| The Life of a Horsetrader | Keigo Kimura | Toshirō Mifune; Machiko Kyō | Drama | |
| Meeting of the Ghost Après-Guerre | Kiyoshi Saeki | Shigeo Miyata; Ryō Ikebe | | The original story of this film is "Conduct Report on Professor Ishinaka" |
| Miss Oyu | Kenji Mizoguchi | Kinuyo Tanaka; Nobuko Otowa | Drama | |
| Nami | Noboru Nakamura | Shin Saburi; Yoko Katsuragi | Drama | Entered into the 1952 Cannes Film Festival |
| Pirates | Hiroshi Inagaki | Toshirō Mifune; Tomoemon Otani | Action | |
| Repast | Mikio Naruse | Ken Uehara; Setsuko Hara | Drama | Won Best Film at the 6th Mainichi Film Awards and at the 2nd Blue Ribbon Awards |
| The Tale of Genji | Kōzaburō Yoshimura | Kazuo Hasegawa; Michiyo Kogure | Romance | Entered into the 1952 Cannes Film Festival |
| Who Knows a Woman's Heart | Kajiro Yamamoto | Mieko Takamine; Ryō Ikebe | Drama | |

== See also ==
- 1951 in Japan
