= Mimi Gamal =

Egyptian actress (born 1941)

- ميمي جمال
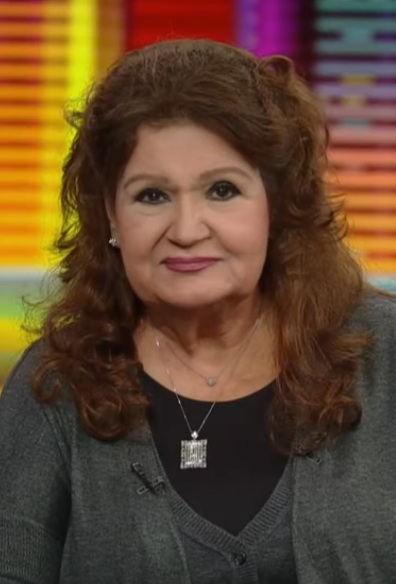
- Mimi Gamal, 4 February 2022
- Born: Amina Mustafa Gamal; 27 May 1941 (age 85); Shubra, Cairo, Egypt
- Occupation: Actor
- Spouse: Hassan Mostapha
- Children: 2

Amina Mustafa Gamal (Arabic: أمينة مصطفى جمال; born on 27 May 1941) known by her stage name as Mimi Gamal (Arabic: ميمي جمال) is an Egyptian actor.

== Biography ==
Born in Shubra, Cairo, Gamal started her career as a child actress in Stronger Than Love (in Arabic أقوى من الحب). She took part in major roles in a great number of films such as Woman's Secret, El Hub Keda, My Husband’s Wife, Sunset and Sunrise, لصوص لكن ظرفاء، شيء من الحب، عالم عيال عيال، سفاح كرموز and in a great number of Egyptian television series, notably in Al Hagg Metwalli's Family (عائلة الحاج متولي), Al Batiniyyah (الباطنية) and Abdel Azeez Street (شارع عبد العزيز). She has also had significant roles in a great number of stage productions, like the famous Number 2 Wins (نمرة 2 يكسب) and Nest of Fools (عش المجانين).

== Personal life ==
She was born in 1941 to an Egyptian father and a Greek mother. She was married to Egyptian actor Hassan Mostapha. They married in June 1966 and had two daughters. Mostapha died on 15 May 2015.
