= Elina Bystritskaya =

Soviet and Ukrainian-born Russian stage and film actress and theater pedagogue

- Элина Быстрицкая
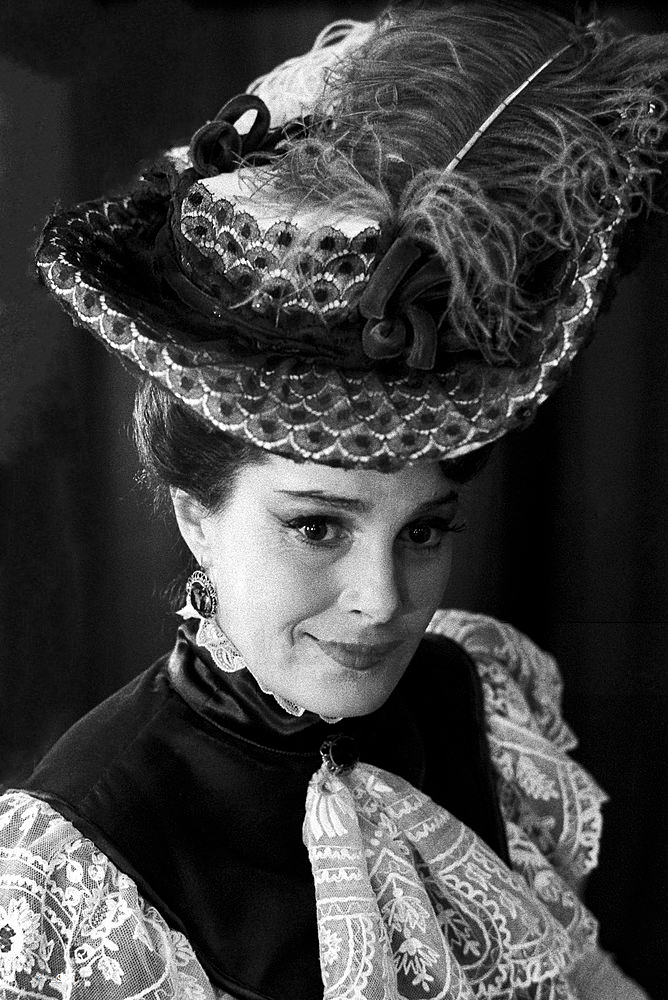
- Bystritskaya in 1964
- Born: 4 April 1928; Kiev, Ukrainian SSR, Soviet Union
- Died: 26 April 2019 (aged 91); Moscow, Russia
- Resting place: Novodevichy Cemetery
- Education: Kiev National I. K. Karpenko-Kary Theatre, Cinema and Television University
- Occupation: Actress
- Years active: 1950–2018

Elina Avraamovna Bystritskaya (Note: Russian: Элина Авраамовна Быстрицкая, romanized: Elina Avraamovna Bystritskaya; Ukrainian: Еліна Авраамівна Бистрицька, romanized: Elina Avraamivna Bystrytska) (4 April 1928 – 26 April 2019) was a Ukrainian-born Soviet and Russian stage and film actress and theater pedagogue. She is regarded as one of the most prominent actresses in the Soviet and Russian film industry. Her career spanned six decades.

== Biography ==
Elina Avraamovna Bystritskaya was born on 4 April 1928, in Kiev into a Jewish family. Her father was a physician. During World War II, she was evacuated to Astrakhan, where she studied a nursing course. From the age of 13, she worked as a nurse and laboratory assistant in front-line mobile evacuation hospital No. 3261, first in Aktyubinsk, then in Stalino and Odessa, where she lived with her mother (who worked in the same hospital).

Later she studied at the Karpenko-Karyi Theater Institute in Kiev and was hired by the Russian Drama Theater in Vilnius upon graduation in 1953. In 1958, Bystritskaia joined the troupe of Maly Theatre in Moscow, where she soon became one of the leading actors.

One of her earliest roles was in Sergei Bondarchuk's and Fridrikh Ermler's Unfinished Story (1955), an archetypal Socialist Realist film. Bystritskaya was personally chosen by Soviet writer Mikhail Sholokhov to play the role of Aksinya in the film adaptation And Quiet Flows the Don (1958), over several other distinguished candidates, notably Nonna Mordyukova. In the 1960s, Bystritskaya concentrated on theatre work in the Maly Theatre, and her appearances on screen grew sporadic. She was named People's Artist of the USSR in 1978.

She was president of the USSR and the Russian rhythmic gymnastics Federation from 1975 to 1992. 1958-1985, she was married to Nikolay Kuzminsky, employee of the USSR Ministry for Foreign Trade.

In March 2014, she joined other Russian cultural personalities in writing a letter to President Vladimir Putin, expressing support for the Russian annexation of Crimea.

She died on 26 April 2019 after a long illness.

== Filmography ==
- 1951: In Peaceful Time as Lena Alekseyenko
- 1951: Taras Shevchenko as episode
- 1954: "Bogatyr" is heading to Marto as radio operator Yevgeníya Sergeyevna
- 1955: Unfinished Story as Yelizaveta Muromtseva
- 1957: Don Silencioso as Aksiniya
- 1958: And Quiet Flows the Don as Aksinya
- 1958: Volunteers as Olga Teplova
- 1960: Russian Souvenir as Pandora Montezi, Italian spy
- 1963: All Remains to People as Ksenia Rumyantseva
- 1964: The Unquenchable Flame as Glasha
- 1966: Summer Residents as Julia Filippovna
- 1967: Nikolay Bauman as Maria Andreyeva
- 1973: Ostrovsky's House (TV Movie) as Glafira
- 1991: Seven Days After The Murder as Kira Alexandrovna
- 1992: Farewell Tour as train passenger
- 1993: Brave Guys as Nadezhda
- 2005: Saga of the Ancient Bulgars (part 1, 2) as Olga of Kiev
- 2006: Muhtar's Return as Alina Stanislavovna

== Honours and awards ==
- Order "For Merit to the Fatherland";
  - 1st class (4 April 2008) – for outstanding contributions to the development of domestic theatrical and cinematic arts, many years of creative activity
  - 2nd class (1 April 1998) – for outstanding contribution to the development of national culture and art
  - 3rd class (11 October 2018) – for outstanding contribution to the development of national culture and art, many years of productive activity

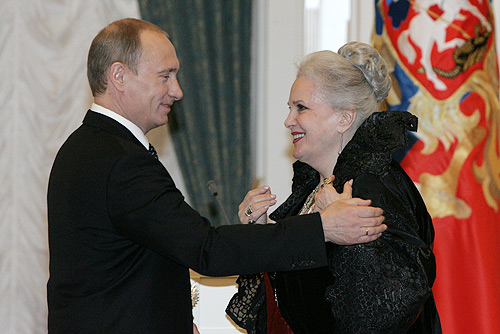
Elina Bystritskaya receives the Order "For Merit to the Fatherland" I degree from Vladimir Putin in 2008

- Order of the October Revolution
- Order of the Patriotic War, 2nd class (1985)
- Order of the Red Banner of Labour
- Order of the Badge of Honour, twice
- Medal "For the Victory over Germany in the Great Patriotic War 1941–1945"
- Honored Artist of the RSFSR (1964)
- People's Artist of the RSFSR (1966)
- People's Artist of the USSR (1978)
- People's Artist of the Georgian SSR
- People's Artist of the Azerbaijan SSR
- People's Artist of the Kazakh SSR
- Prize of the Russian Federation in the field of culture (2006)
- Jubilee Medal "In Commemoration of the 100th Anniversary of the Birth of Vladimir Ilyich Lenin"
- Jubilee Medal "Twenty Years of Victory in the Great Patriotic War 1941–1945"
- Jubilee Medal "Thirty Years of Victory in the Great Patriotic War 1941–1945"
- Jubilee Medal "Forty Years of Victory in the Great Patriotic War 1941–1945"
- Jubilee Medal "50 Years of Victory in the Great Patriotic War 1941–1945"
- Jubilee Medal "60 Years of Victory in the Great Patriotic War 1941–1945"
- Jubilee Medal "65 Years of Victory in the Great Patriotic War 1941–1945"
- Medal of Zhukov
- Medal "In Commemoration of the 850th Anniversary of Moscow"
- Medal "Veteran of Labour"
- A minor planet, 6180 Bystritskaya, is named after her.
