= The Taming of the Scoundrel =

- Italian theatrical release poster by Renato Casaro
- Directed by: Franco Castellano; Giuseppe Moccia
- Written by: Franco Castellano; Giuseppe Moccia
- Starring: Adriano Celentano; Ornella Muti
- Cinematography: Alfio Contini
- Edited by: Antonio Siciliano
- Music by: Detto Mariano
- Production company: Cineriz
- Distributed by: Verleih J
- Release date: 20 December 1980 (Italy)
- Running time: 96 min. ca. (104 min. original uncut version)
- Country: Italy
- Language: Italian
- Box office: 17 billion lire (Italy); 56 million tickets (USSR)

The Taming of the Scoundrel (Italian: Il bisbetico domato , literally "The ill-tempered man being tamed") is a 1980 Italian film directed by Castellano & Pipolo The plot is loosely inspired by William Shakespeare's The Taming of the Shrew.

== Synopsis ==
Adriano Celentano plays the part of Elia, a well-to-do and witty farmer who is, however, a somewhat grumpy loner who specifically resists his housekeeper Mamie's efforts to marry him off to a nice girl. One stormy night, however, a beautiful young lady named Lisa is forced to stop at his farmstead because her car has broken down while she was on her way to her fiancé. Intrigued by Elia's personality, she decides to stay and make the grumpy farmer come out of his rough shell, an intention which in time develops into genuine affection.

Elia is not unresponsive to Lisa's advances (the heat stirred by which he tries to alleviate by splitting logs of wood), but he maintains his rough exterior and tries his best to get rid of her, to the point that he once even tractor-drags her bed, with Lisa inside, out of the guestroom into the midst of the nearby village after she attempts to extend her stay by claiming that her ankle is sprained. Eventually, Lisa leaves in disgust, but so does Mamie, who has developed a genuine liking to Lisa. Also, as soon as she is gone, Elia realizes too late that he has also fallen in love with Lisa.

Eventually, in order to win her back, Elia attends a basketball match between a team from his own village and the team sponsored by Lisa's fiancé. With his native team on the verge of losing the game, Elia enters the field and employs his skills to tip the scores to their benefit. Following the successful conclusion of the match, he asks for Lisa's hand, but she refuses to do so unless he has publicly declared his love for her. Using the playing hall's loudspeaker system, Elia does so at full volume; the two get married, and Elia unloads his years of penned-back sexuality in a manner which leaves the house (quite literally) aquake.

== Cast ==
- Adriano Celentano as Elia Codogno
- Ornella Muti as Lisa Silvestri
- Edith Peters as Mamie
- Pippo Santonastaso as Don Cirillo
- Milly Carlucci as Renata
- Marco Columbro as the chauffeur
- Sandro Ghiani as the gas station attendant

== Reception ==
=== Box office ===
The Taming of the Scoundrel was the top grossing film on the Italian market for the season 1980/1981, earning about 17 billion lire. The film was released in the Soviet Union in 1983, selling 56 million tickets in the country. This made it the year's highest-grossing foreign film in the Soviet Union, and the eleventh highest-grossing foreign film ever in the Soviet Union.

=== Music ===
The closing theme song "Innamorata, Incavolata A Vita" performed by Adriano Celentano was a minor hit, ranking 18 and staying on the Italian singles chart for 16 weeks.
