= Naglaa Fathi =

Egyptian actress (born 1951)

- نجلاء فتحي
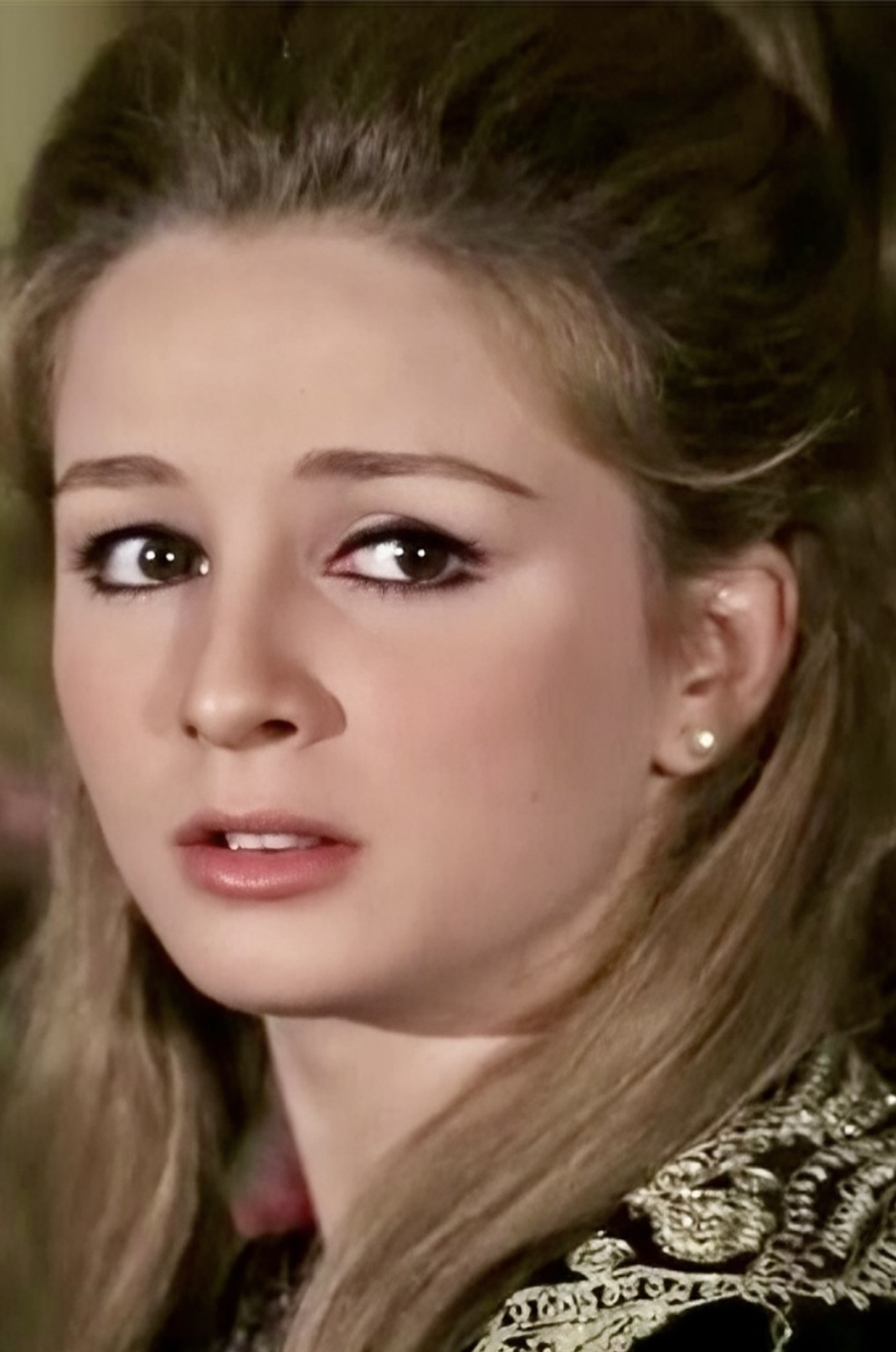
- Naglaa Fathi, c. 1972
- Born: Fatmah Elzahra' Hesin Fathi; 21 December 1951 (age 74); Heliopolis, Cairo, Egypt
- Occupation: Actress
- Years active: 1966–2000
- Spouse: Hamdi Qandil
- Children: 1

Naglaa Fathi (Arabic: نجلاء فتحي), whose birth name is Fatmah Elzahra' Hesin Fathi (Arabic: فاطمة الزهراء حسين فتحي, born 21 December 1951), is an Egyptian actress. She started her acting career in 1967 and has played a role in over 80 films. She established a production company and produced films, including film : Supermarket (1990) in which she was actress also. The award-winning actress also wrote the screenplay for Tomorrow I Will Take Revenge (Arabic: غدا سأنتقم), (1980).

== Career ==
Naglaa Fathi started her acting career in Egyptian cinema at age 15 when she was approached by the Egyptian film-producer Adli Elmowalled, while she was at the beach in Alexandria with her friends. When she was 15 years old she became an actress in the movie The Three Friends. She dropped out of school in 1967 to get involved in acting. Her career began in earnest and she starred in the 1968 Egyptian film Afrah (Arabic: أفراح, meaning "Joys"), produced in Beirut, Lebanon. The director of the film, Ali Badrakhan had reservations about Naglaa, but fellow producer Ramses Naguib saw her as potential romance icon.

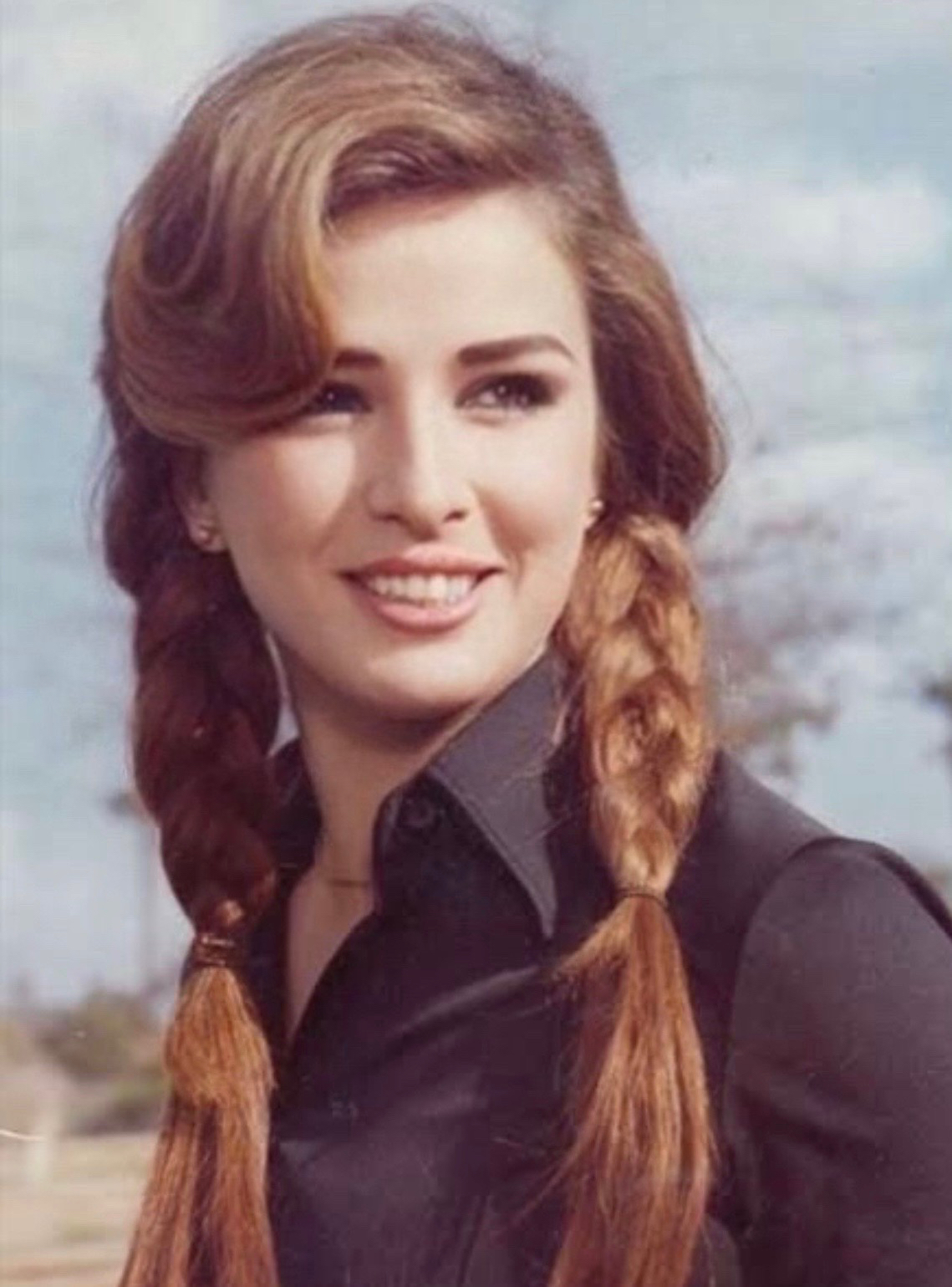
Naglaa Fathi in 1976

Throughout the 1970s, she acted in roughly 15 films a year, predominantly romantic dramas, including her 1970 film Imra'at Zawgy (Arabic: إمرأة زوجي, meaning My Husband's Wife) and her 1975 film Al-Ridaʼ al-Abyaḍ (Arabic: الرداء الأبيض, meaning The White Dress), achieving huge financial success both locally and internationally. In the Egyptian film industry, she was only second to actress Faten Hamama in the number of romance films acted in, though not as popular since she was mostly given secondary roles to male characters. During the 1980s, Fathi largely departed from this role and began acting more complicated roles in movies dealing with a social and political dimension.

She received an award for best actress for her starring role in El Garage (1995), where she played a deserted and impoverished single mother who lives inside a garage with her five children, all of whom she gradually gives up to other families as her health deteriorates. The film was based on a true story and Fathi described it as the "most difficult and painful" role she has had to play. According to writer Nagla El-Baz, the movie was a success in raising awareness about the issue of overpopulation.

== Personal life ==
Fathi was born in Heliopolis, Cairo, Egypt to an Egyptian family consisting of a father from Fayyum and a mother from Heliopolis, Cairo. Her first marriage was a secret marriage as a teenage, for a short period. Her family did not know about this secret marriage. She had no children from this secret marriage, which ended in divorce. She married again. She had her only child, a daughter named Yasmin (Arabic: ياسمين), with her second husband. This marriage ended in divorce in 1977. In 1992 she married well-known Egyptian journalist and television presenter Hamdi Qandil. While she stated that her first marriage, in 1969, was a secret kept from her family, she described her second marriage in 1971 as a balancing act for her life amid her new fame and fortune and an attempt to raise a large family. She said in a 2000 interview that Qandil, her current husband, "is the first man who has fascinated me. It is not easy to bewitch me, but he did. I feel like a student when I'm with him: I discover new qualities in him every day."

Fathi is a Nasserist and Arab nationalist; she supports the Palestinian cause and all pan-Arabism causes. When the late Egyptian president Gamal Abdel Nasser declared his resignation after the Egyptian defeat in the 1967 War, she joined demonstrations protesting his departure, which he retracted days later. She has worn the traditional Palestinian rural dress during some interviews and public events as an expression of solidarity and said she was deeply distraught by the events in the Palestinian Territories, particularly stating, "My happiness has been shattered by the events. I don't know how to be happy, really. Something inside me has grown dark."

== Selected filmography ==
=== Film ===
Year	Film	Role	Notes
1966	The Three Friends الاصدقاء الثلاثه	Zahrah زهره	
1968	The Splendor of Love روعـة الحـب	Hayam هيام	
1968	Joys افراح	Bothaynah بثينه	
1968	The Thief Of The Paper حرامى الورقه		Musical
1969	half An Hour Marriage نص ساعه جواز		
1969	Love Of A Schoolgirl غرام تلميذه		
1969	Secrets Of Girls اسرار البنات		
1970	The Mirror المرايه	Karimah كريمه	
1970	My Husband's Wife امرأة زوجي	Wafaa وفاء	
1971	5 Lovers Street ٥ شارع الحبايب		
1971	Delicious Journey رحله لذيذه	Zahrah زهره	
1972	The Emotion And The Body العاطفه و الجسد	Hoda هدى	
1972	The Devil Is A Woman الشيطان امرأة	Yasminah ياسمينه	
1972	A Nose and Three Eyes أنف وثلاث عيون	Nagwa نجوى	
1973	My Blood, My Tears And My Smileدمى و دموعى و ابتسامتى	Nahed ناهد	
1974	Bedur بدور		
1974	The Most Beautiful Days of My Life أجمل أيام عمري		
1975	The White Dress الرداء الابيض		
1976	No Time for Tears لا وقت للدموع		
1976	Moon of Time قمر الزمان		
1977	Sonya And The Madman سونيا و المجنون	Sonya سونيا	
1977	Love Madness جنون الحب	Mona منى	
1979	Alexandria... Why? اسكندريه ليه؟	Sarah ساره	
1980	Love Does Not See the Sun حب لا يرى الشمس		
1980	Homeless الشريده		
1984	The Unknown المجهول	Nadia ناديه	
1985	Excuse Me Law عفوا ايها القانون	Hoda هدى	
1986	Graveyards for Rent مدافن مفروشه للايجار	Nabila نبيله	
1988	Divorced Woman امرأة مطلقة	Salwa سلوى	
1989	The Dreams of Hind and Camelia احلام هند و كاميليا	Camelia كاميليا	
1990	Supermarket سوبرماركت	Amira اميره	Producer
1990	Below Zero تحت الصفر	Raga رجاء	
1991	Suspicion اشتباه	Nadia ناديه	
1995	The Garage الجراج	Naimah نعيمه	
1998	Concert in the Street of Happiness كونشرتو فى درب سعاده	Sonia سونيا	
