= Tetsu no tsume =

1951 black-and-white Japanese horror film

Tetsu no tsume 鉄の爪 (Claws of Steel)
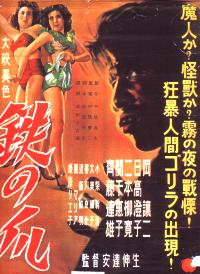
- Japanese movie poster
- Directed by: Nobuo Adachi
- Written by: Nobuo Adachi
- Produced by: Daiei Motion Picture Company
- Starring: Joji Oka; Sumiko Odaka; Ryosuke Kagawa
- Music by: Yoshinobu Shiraki
- Distributed by: Daiei Motion Picture Company
- Release date: February 24, 1951
- Running time: 82 minutes
- Country: Japan
- Language: Japanese

Tetsu no tsume (鉄の爪, Tetsu no tsume) (also known as Claws of Steel or Claws of Iron) is a 1951 black-and-white Japanese horror film (J-Horror) directed by Nobuo Adachi for Daiei Films. It was shot in Black and White, Academy ratio full-screen, and was never dubbed in English. The film was never shown in the United States, and was only available on laserdisc in Japan.

== Synopsis ==
A meek church worker who was once bitten by an ape on a jungle island in World War II begins to transform into a beast-man whenever he drinks alcohol. He develops a split personality like Jekyll & Hyde, one half adoring a virginal church organist, the other lusting after an immoral showgirl. A friend puts him into his nightclub act, showcasing his weird ability to transform from man to beast so effectively. At the climax, the man reverts entirely to bestial and wrecks a nightclub, taking a pretty showgirl hostage.

== Cast ==
- Joji Oka
- Sumiko Odaka
- Ryosuke Kagawa
- Shiro Kanemitsu
- Toshiaki Konoe
- Kanji Koshiba
- Shozo Nanbu
- Tatsuo Saitō
- Chieko Seki
- Kazue Tamaki
