= The Black Tulip (1964 film) =

1964 film by Christian-Jaque

- Film poster for La Tulipe noire
- Directed by: Christian-Jaque
- Written by: Henri Jeanson; Christian-Jaque
- Based on: the novel The Black Tulip by Alexandre Dumas, père
- Cinematography: Henri Decaë
- Edited by: Jacques Desagneaux
- Music by: Gérard Calvi
- Production companies: Mediterranean Film Productions; Agata Films; Mizar Movies; Flora Film
- Distributed by: Dicifrance
- Release date: February 28, 1964 (France)
- Running time: 110 minutes
- Countries: France; Italy; Spain
- Language: French
- Box office: $35.9 million (est.)

The Black Tulip (French: La Tulipe noire) is a French-Italian-Spanish film which reused some names in the novel of the same title by Alexandre Dumas but its story does not follow the novel. It is, essentially, a star vehicle for the popular French actor Alain Delon.

== Synopsis ==
In June 1789 in the town of Roussillon, aristocrat Guillaume de Saint Preux leads a double life as a masked bandit known as the Black Tulip. The Black Tulip only robs rich aristocrats, so the local peasants regard him as a hero. Baron La Mouche is convinced Guillaume is the Tulip. During a robbery, he scars the Tulip's face, and hopes to use this to expose Guillaume.

Guillaume asks his twin brother Julien to impersonate him. Julien is much more gentle and idealistic than his brother. While the impersonation goes well at first, Julien is shocked to discover that Guillaume robs aristocrats for the thrill and the money, not for political reasons.

Julien falls in love with a peasant girl called Caroline, the daughter of the revolutionary Plantin. Caro helps teach Julien how to be a better swordsman.

When Baron La Mouche feels that there may be a connection between Guillaume de Saint Preux and the masked hero, he has Julien imprisoned. The original Black Tulip rescues him, but while Julien escapes, his brother is caught in the act and soon afterwards, executed.

In the end, Julien succeeds his brother as the Black Tulip. He rises to the occasion, and is now as good a fighter for justice as his brother was. He has also won the heart of Caroline, who supports him.

== Cast ==
- Alain Delon – Julien de Saint Preux / Guillaume de Saint Preux
- Virna Lisi – Caroline „Caro“ Plantin
- Adolfo Marsillach – Baron La Mouche
- Dawn Addams – Marquise Catherine de Vigogne
- Akim Tamiroff – Marquis de Vigogne
- Laura Valenzuela – Lisette
- George Rigaud – Head of police
- Francis Blanche – Plantin
- José Jaspe – Brignon
- Robert Manuel – Prince Alexandre de Grassillac de Morvan-Le-Breau

== Production ==
Delon made the film after seeing the success Jean-Paul Belmondo had in a swashbuckler, Cartouche (1962).

The film was shot on location in Spain, including Cáceres. Interiors were shot at the Victorine Studios in Nice.

== Reception ==
The film was a big success at the French box office. It was the tenth most popular film of 1964. In France, it sold 3,107,512 admissions, grossing an estimated $1.9 million. (Note: See Film industry § Average ticket price.) In the Soviet Union, it sold 47.8 million tickets in 1970 and 28.9 million tickets in 1984, for a total of 76.7 million tickets and $34 million gross. The film also sold 3 million tickets in Italy, 1.47 million tickets in Hungary, and 978,000 tickets in Germany. In total, the film sold 85,255,512 tickets worldwide, grossing an estimated $35.9 million in France and the Soviet Union.

Alain Delon used this opportunity to demonstrate his range as an actor by playing both brothers. In 1975, he would again play a masked swashbuckler in his Zorro film.
