= In Peaceful Time =

- Russian: В мирные дни
- Directed by: Vladimir Braun
- Written by: Iosif Prut
- Produced by: L. Koretsky
- Starring: Nikolai Timofeyev; Arkadi Tolbuzin; Aleksandr Grechany; Sergei Gurzo; Andrei Sova; Vyacheslav Tikhonov
- Cinematography: Mikhail Chyorny; Daniil Demutsky
- Edited by: N. Kardash
- Music by: Yuli Meitus
- Release date: 1950
- Running time: 97 min.
- Country: Soviet Union
- Language: Russian

In Peaceful Time (Russian: В мирные дни, romanized: V mirnye dni) is a 1950 Soviet action war adventure film directed by Vladimir Braun.

== Plot ==
The film tells about the life of submariners in peacetime. At first glance, everything is fine and peaceful, but everything changed as soon as military exercises began. As it turned out, foreign intelligence wants at any cost to obtain secret information from Soviet submariners.

== Cast ==
- Nikolai Timofeyev as Afanasy
- Arkadi Tolbuzin as Georgy Orlov
- Aleksandr Grechany as midshipman
- Sergei Gurzo as Pavlo Panychuk
- Andrei Sova as Suchkov
- Vyacheslav Tikhonov as Grinevsky
- Karaman Mgeladze as Vakhtang Meskhishvili
- Georgi Yumatov as sailor Kurakin
- Dmitry Kostenko as sailor Pivovarov
- Viktor Avdyushko as Stepan Matveyev, diver
- Viktor Dobrovolsky as admiral
- Viktor Mironov as Ilin, Captain I Rank
- Leonid Kmit as chief of staff
- Elina Bystritskaya as Lena
- Veronika Vasilyeva as Zina
- Mikhail Gluzsky as duty midshipman

== Release ==
Vladimir Braun's film takes the 720th place in the list of most popular box-office films of the Soviet distribution. It was watched by 23.5 million viewers.
