= Red Devil =

Red Devil or Red Devils may refer to:

== Places ==
- Red Devil, Alaska, US

== People ==
- Ii Naomasa (1561–1602), Japanese general known as the Red Devil, and the unit he led was known as the Red Devils
- Camille Jenatzy, a Belgian race car driver nicknamed Le Diable Rouge (The Red Devil)
- Manfred von Richthofen, a German fighter ace nicknamed Le Diable Rouge (The Red Devil) by his enemies

== Animals ==
- Red devil cichlid (disambiguation), two species of cichlid fish from genus Amphilophus
- Humboldt squid, a carnivorous marine creature (Diablo Rojo) named for its tendency to flash red and white when on the attack

== Drugs ==
- Doxorubicin, trade name Adriamycin, a chemotherapy drug nicknamed "red devil" for its deep red color and dangerous side effects
- Secobarbital, trade name Seconal, a barbiturate sedative-hypnotic drug nicknamed "red devil" for its packaging in red capsules

== Art, entertainment, and media ==
=== Literature ===
- "Red Devils" (story), a 1921 Soviet adventure story by Pavel Blyakhin

=== Film ===
- Red Devils (film), a 1923 Soviet adventure film

=== Fictional characters ===
- Red Devil (comics), aka Kid Devil, a DC comics superhero
- Reddevil, an alias of the Daredevil character
- Red Devil, the main villain of season 1 of Scream Queens

=== Music ===
==== Groups ====
- The Red Devils (blues band), 1980s–1990s Los Angeles-based blues band
- The Red Devils, 1920s Hawaiian band featuring "King" Bennie Nawahi

==== Songs ====
- "Red Devil", a song by Yngwie Malmsteen from Perpetual Flame

== Brands and enterprises ==
- Red Devil Energy Drink
- Red Devil, Inc., a manufacturer of caulking, glazing, sealants and related products in Pryor, Oklahoma
- Red Devil Cayenne Pepper Sauce, a brand made by Trappey's Hot Sauce
- Red Devils Motorcycle Club, a prominent puppet club of the Hells Angels

== Military ==
=== France ===
- Diables Rouges, nickname of SPA 160 a former unit of the French Air Force

=== Italy ===
- Diavoli Rossi ("Red Devils"), nickname of the Sassari Mechanized Brigade
- Diavoli Rossi ("Red Devils"), a former aerobatics display team of the Italian Air Force
- "Red Devils", British nickname for Italian SRCM Mod. 35 grenades

=== United Kingdom ===
- "Red Devils", nickname of the Parachute Regiment, of the British Army
- "Red Devils", nickname of the 1st Parachute Brigade (United Kingdom), a British airborne brigade active during World War II

=== United States ===
- "Red Devils", nickname of the 508th Infantry Regiment (United States)
- "Red Devils", nickname of the 5th Infantry Division (United States)
- "Red Devils", German nickname for soldiers of the 34th Infantry Division (United States)
- "Red Devils", nickname of the 92nd Field Artillery Regiment
- "Rice's Red Devils", nickname of the 89th Tank Battalion
- "Red Devils", nickname of the 702nd Tank Battalion
- "Fightin' Red Devils", nickname of the 40th Pursuit Squadron of the United States Army Air Corps
- "Red Devils", nickname of the 107th Fighter Squadron
- "Red Devils", nickname of the 96th Bomb Squadron
- "Red Devil", nickname of the 555th Bomb Squadron of the US Army Air Forces
- "Red Devils", nickname of VMFA-232, a U.S. Marine fighter attack squadron

=== Other countries ===
- "Red Devils", nickname of the Parachute Regiment of the Indian Army
- Roter Teufel (Red Devil), nickname of German submarine U-552
- Tercera Compañia de Infantería Diablo Rojo (Third Red Devil Infantry Company) a unit of the defunct Panamanian Defense Forces

== Sports team nicknames ==
=== Association football ===
==== Clubs ====
- 1. FC Kaiserslautern, German football club
- Al Ahly SC, Egyptian football club
- América de Cali, Colombian football club
- C.S.D. Municipal, Guatemalan football club
- Campbelltown City SC, Australian football club
- FK Radnički 1923, Serbian football club
- Club Atlético Independiente, Argentine football club
- Crawley Town F.C., English football club
- FC Rouen, a French football club
- Grazer AK, Austrian football club
- Hapoel Tel Aviv F.C., Israeli football club
- Manchester United F.C., English football club
- Nkana F.C., Zambian football club
- Toluca FC, a Mexican football club
- Urawa Red Diamonds, Japanese football club

==== National teams ====
- Belgium national football team, (since 1906) The Red Devils
- Congo national football team
- South Korea national football team, (since 1995) Red Devils
  - Red Devils (supporters club), the official supporters group of the South Korea national football team

=== Other sports ===
- Arizona Red Devils, an American women's gridiron football team
- Canterbury Red Devils, a New Zealand ice hockey team
- Los Angeles Red Devils, an American defunct basketball team
- Montpellier Red Devils, a French rugby league club
- Red Devil Sport Club, a Russian-based MMA training team/association
- Salford Red Devils, an English rugby league club
- Scuderia Ferrari, a Formula One team based in Italy

== School nicknames and mascots ==
- Augusta High School (Arkansas)
- Dickinson College (Carlisle, Pennsylvania)
- Druid Hills High School, Atlanta, Georgia
- East Valley High School (Yakima, Washington)
- Eureka College, Eureka, Illinois
- Freeport High School (New York), Freeport, New York
- Germantown High School (Tennessee), Germantown, Tennessee
- Green Bay East High School, Green Bay, Wisconsin
- Grosse Ile High School, Grosse Ile, Michigan
- Halls High School, Knoxville, Tennessee
- Hinsdale Central High School, Hinsdale, Illinois
- Hunterdon Central Regional High School, Flemington, New Jersey
- Huntley Project High School, Worden, Montana
- Jackson High School (Jackson, Georgia)
- Jacksonville High School (Arkansas)
- Kathleen High School (Lakeland, Florida)
- Lancaster High School (Virginia)
- Lowell High School (Lowell, Indiana)
- Maplesville High School, Maplesville, Alabama
- Marion-Franklin High School, Columbus, Ohio
- Murtaugh High School, Murtaugh, Idaho
- Owensboro High School, Owensboro, Kentucky
- Peekskill High School, Peekskill, New York
- Pike High School, Indianapolis, Indiana
- Richmond High School (Richmond, Indiana)
- Ridge High School, Basking Ridge, New Jersey
- San Francisco University High School, San Francisco, California
- Springville High School (Utah)
- Tippecanoe High School, Tipp City, Ohio
- Washington International School, Washington, D.C.
- West Lafayette Junior-Senior High School, West Lafayette, Indiana

== Transportation ==
- Red Devil (interurban), a high-speed interurban railcar
- Baldwin Red Devil, an early series of airplanes built by Thomas Scott Baldwin
- South African Class 26 4-8-4, a South African locomotive nicknamed Red Devil

== Other uses ==
- The Red Devils, aerobatics team led by the late Charlie Hillard
- Geosesarma hagen, a species of crab sometimes called "red devil" in the aquarium trade
- Red Devil, a variety of apple with strongly red blushed flesh and skin

== See also ==
- Black Devil (disambiguation)
- White devil (disambiguation)
