= Keosayan =

Keosayan (Armenian: Քեոսայան) is an Armenian surname. Notable people with the surname include:

- Edmond Keosayan (1936–1994), Armenian Soviet film director and musician
- Tigran Keosayan (1966–2025), Russian-Armenian film director, actor and writer, son of Edmond
