= Lancaster High School =

Lancaster High School may refer to:

- Central Lancaster High School in Lancaster, Lancashire, England
- Lancaster High School (California) in Lancaster, California
- Lancaster High School (New York) in Lancaster, New York
- Lancaster High School (Ohio) in Lancaster, Ohio
- Lancaster High School (South Carolina), in Lancaster, South Carolina
- Lancaster High School (Texas), in Lancaster, Texas
- Lancaster High School (Virginia) in Lancaster, Virginia
