= Svetlana Svetlichnaya =

Russian actress (1940–2024)

- Светлана Светличная
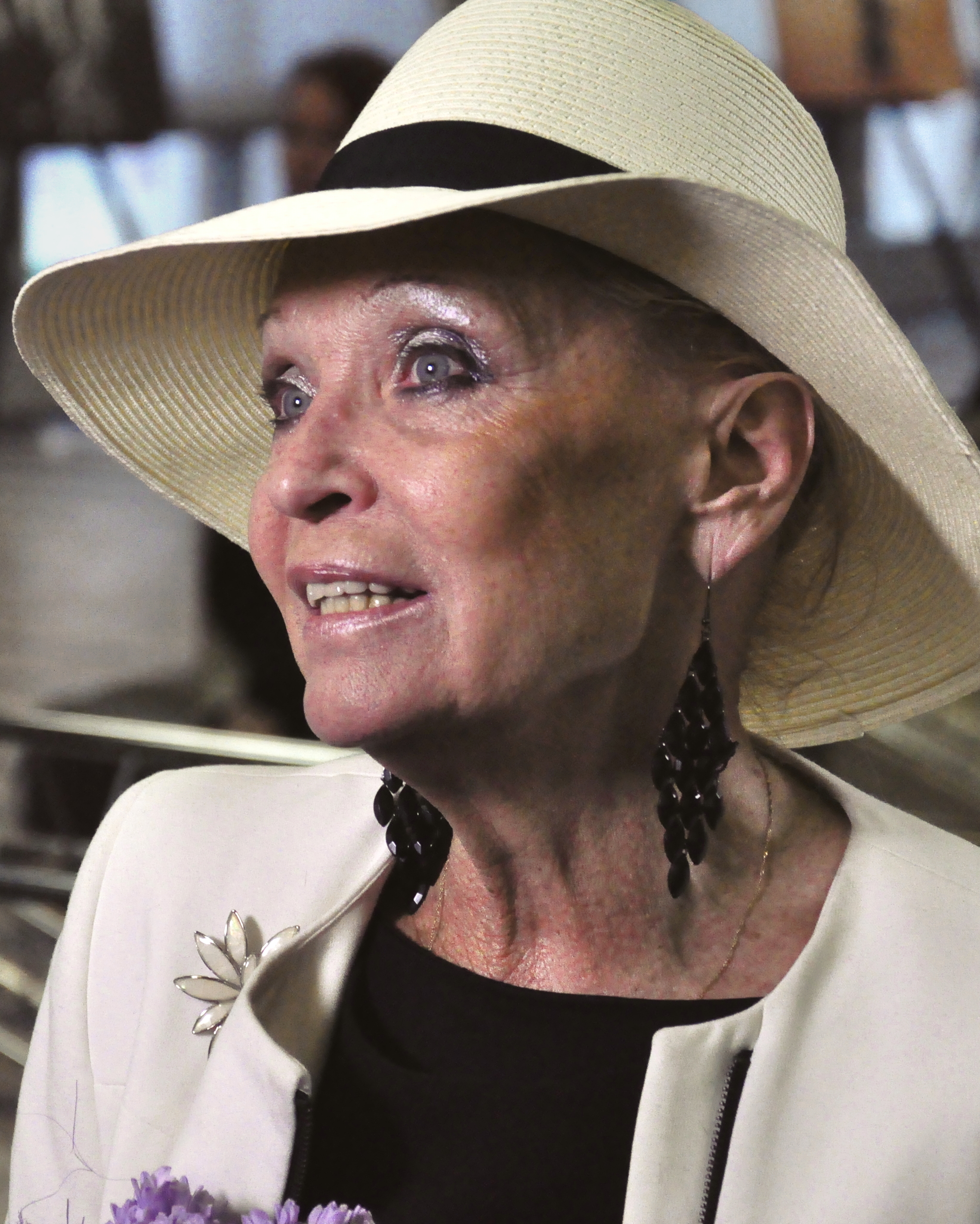
- Svetlichnaya in 2013
- Born: 15 May 1940; Leninakan, Armenian SSR, USSR
- Died: 16 November 2024 (aged 84); Moscow, Russia
- Occupation: Actress
- Years active: 1960–2024
- Spouses: Vladimir Ivashov (m. 1959; died 1995) Sergey Smirnov-Sokolsky (m. 1998; div. 1998)

Signature
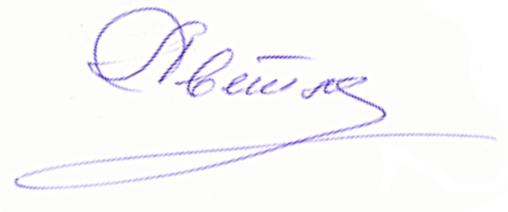

Svetlana Afanasyevna Svetlichnaya (Russian: Светлана Афанасьевна Светличная; 15 May 1940 – 16 November 2024) was a Soviet and Russian actress most famous for her role in The Diamond Arm (1968).

== Biography ==
Svetlichnaya was born in the city of Leninakan (now Gyumri), Armenian SSR, Soviet Union on 15 May 1940 to Afanasy Mikhailovich Svetlichnyi and Maria Feodorovna Zolotareva. During World War II the family lived in the town of Kolomak in the Kharkiv Oblast, then moved to the city Okhtyrka in the Sumy Oblast. Her father was in the military, and the family followed her father to his place of service. They lived in Ukraine and Austria, and at the age of 10, Svetlana lived on the Baltic coast, in the city of Sovetsk, Kaliningrad Oblast. When Svetlana graduated from high school, her mother sent her to Moscow by train. There Svetlana went to the Gerasimov Institute of Cinematography (VGIK).

At VGIK, she studied under Mikhail Romm, and his combined directing-acting course. During these studies, she studied with Valery Spout, Zhanna Prokhorenko, Galina Polskikh, Andron Konchalovsky, and Andrei Smirnov. On stage, she played a student, Elisabetta Procter in Salem's Process, Katyusha Maslova in Resurrection, and Maryanka in Cossacks.

She played the lead role in the 1965 romantic comedy film The Cook.

After her role as Anna Sergeyevna in The Diamond Arm, her phrase ''It's not my fault! He came by himself!'' became one of the most popular in the Soviet Union.

Svetlichnaya died in Moscow on 16 November 2024, at the age of 84.

== Selected films ==
- They Conquer the Skies (1963)
- I Am Twenty (1965)
- Thirty Three (1965)
- The Cook (1965)
- The Diamond Arm (1968)
- To Love (1968)
- The New Adventures of the Elusive Avengers (1968)
- Seventeen Moments of Spring (1973) [Television series]
- Father Sergius (1978)
- Anna Pavlova (1983)
- Day of Wrath (1985)
- House on a Rock (1994)
- Goddess: How I fell in Love (2004)
- The Girl and Death (2012)
