= The Ghost (2008 film) =

2008 Russian thriller film

- Directed by: Karen Oganesyan
- Produced by: Ruben Dishdishyan; Anna Melikyan; Irakli carbo Aram Movsesyan; Yuri Moroz
- Starring: Konstantin Khabensky; Vladimir Mashkov; Chulpan Khamatova; Armen Dzhigarkhanyan
- Cinematography: Zaur Bolotaev
- Music by: Nino Katamadze; Insight
- Release date: 12 August 2008 (Vyborg Film Festival)
- Running time: 104 minutes
- Country: Russia
- Language: Russian

The Ghost (Russian: Домовой, romanized: Domovoi - literally ‘House spirit’) is a 2008 Russian thriller film directed by Karen Oganesyan.

== Plot ==
Crime fiction author Anton Prachenko is experiencing a creative crisis. New books are not written, old ones are badly sold. In addition there are problems with his small son and beloved woman which does not help with creating masterpieces. The legendary hired killer nicknamed as "Ghost" mercilessly shoots up a car with two people inside before his very eyes and helps Prachenko get out of his crisis in an unusual way. The killer becomes his ideological mastermind, brutally and visually revealing to him the harsh truth of life. Now they are inextricably linked with each other.

Carried away by the suddenly discovered prospects, the desire to go deeper into the skin of the hired killer, Anton loses all vigilance and the mysterious and cruel "Ghost" substitutes him. It turns out that the "mark" Anton was amusing himself with was the contract of "Ghost". And at the last stage of the scenario the killer murders the "mark" for real ... with the help of the same pistol with which Anton learned to shoot. All the evidence points to the writer. Now the police and bandits immediately rush in pursuit of Anton. Having kidnapped the agitated Anton, the "Ghost" takes him to some hovel outside the city, chains him up and threatening with reprisals against his relatives forces him to finish the book he started. While the writer is busy with this, the killer "disposes" of all witnesses and then goes to kill Anton. "Ghost" unfastens the writer and sets the house on fire. Exhausted Anton manages to hit "Ghost's" head and runs out into the street. When he runs a distance, the house explodes.

All charges have been dropped from Anton. The charred corpse found in the house is buried in a semi-abandoned cemetery somewhere outside the city. After some time, Anton, who became famous and revered thanks to a new book about the "Ghost", sees through a window a familiar silhouette at a book signing. In a panic, Anton leaves everything and hurries back to his relatives. Having made sure of their safety, Anton walks with them along the lake shore. One time the killer told Prachenko that it is possible to "carry out" any mark. It is more difficult to get away from persecution. After some time when Anton and his family leave, someone comes to the shore of the lake and feeds the birds. There is no doubt that the "Ghost" is alive and that the explosion of the house was just a dramatization of death, arranged in the spirit of Machiavelli. From now on, Anton's life will be completely different from the past. He will never forget the words of the killer: "You are not alone in the street ...".

== Cast ==
- Konstantin Khabensky as Anton Prachenko
- Vladimir Mashkov as Domovoy
- Chulpan Khamatova as Vika
- Armen Dzhigarkhanyan as Yavorsky
- Aleksandr Adabashyan as editor
- Vitali Kishchenko as investigator Snesarev
- Lyudmila Gavrilova

== Reception ==
The film had a positive reception. Khabensky's acting was praised but the picture also received some criticism for predictable plotting.
