= EFMA =

EFMA may stand for:

- Ethernet in the First Mile Alliance, a telecommunications equipment vendor's consortium
- European Forum of Medical Associations, a European liaison to World Health Organization
- Evangelical Fellowship of Missions Agencies, a professional association of evangelical missions entities (former Evangelical Foreign Missions Association)
- The ICAO airport code for Mariehamn Airport
