= Lyudmila Gavrilova =

Soviet and Russian actress (1951–2025)

- Людмила Гаврилова
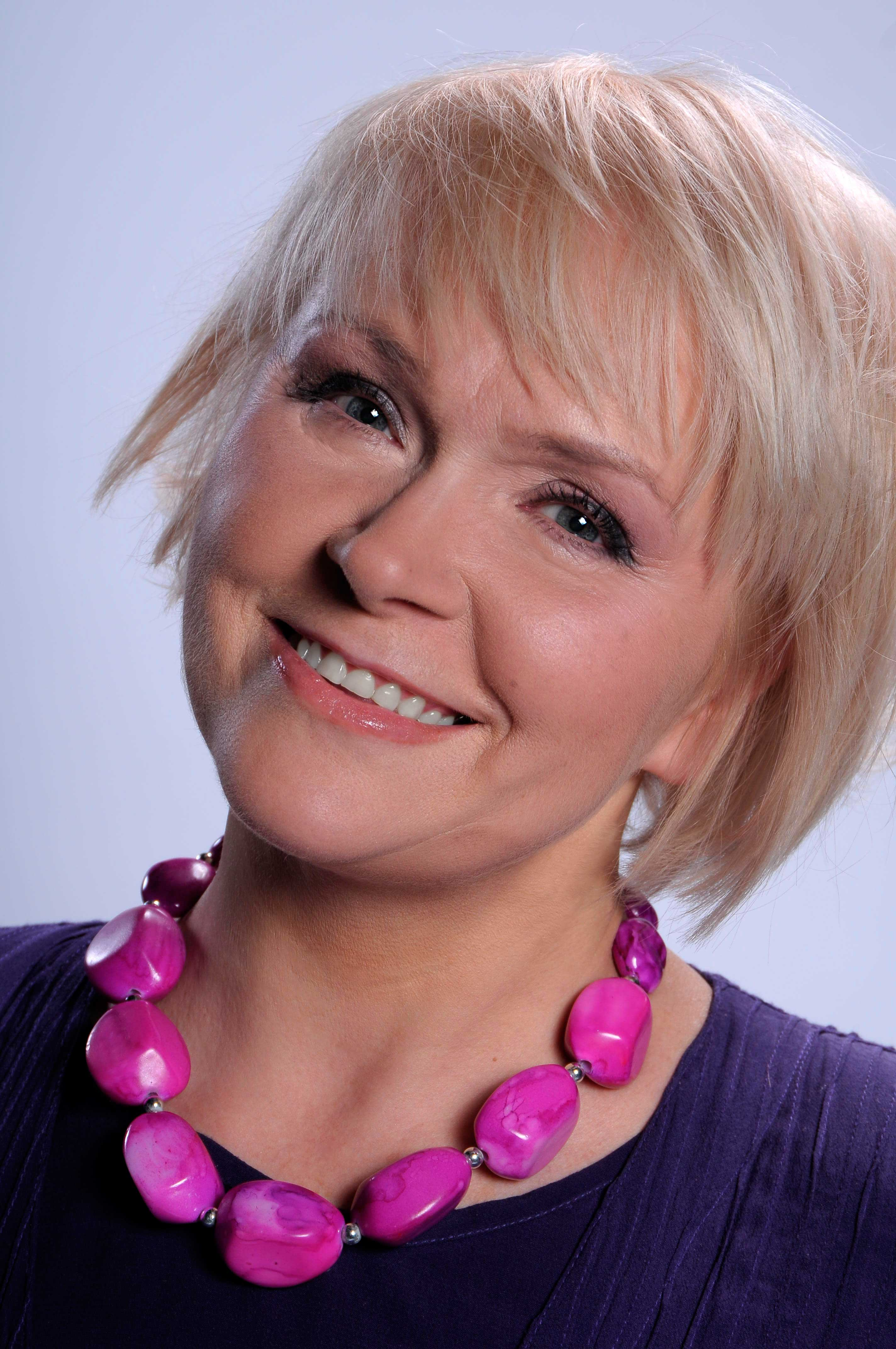
- Gavrilova in 2012
- Born: Lyudmila Ivanovna Gavrilova; 17 November 1951; Kaluga, Russian SFSR, USSR
- Died: 24 September 2025 (aged 73)
- Occupation: Actress
- Years active: 1971–2025

Lyudmila Ivanovna Gavrilova (Russian: Людмила Ивановна Гаврилова; 17 November 1951 – 24 September 2025) was a Soviet and Russian film and stage actress, lecturer of acting Boris Shchukin Theatre Institute, a leading informational and educational channel Nastroyeniye on TV Tsentr channel. Honored Artist of Russia (2007).

== Life and career ==
Gavrilova was born on 17 November 1951, in the city of Kaluga and spent her childhood in her hometown, where she later graduated from high school.

In 1973 she graduated from the Boris Shchukin Theatre Institute (Tatyana Kopteva's course). In the same year she joined the troupe of Moscow Satire Theatre under the direction of Valentin Pluchek.

In 1973 she made her debut in the title role in the play Pippi Longstocking directed by Margarita Mikaelyan.

Gavrilova died on 24 September 2025, at the age of 73.

== Selected filmography ==
- 1971 We Have a Factory as Alla
- 1974 Northern Rhapsody as Tonya Sevastyanova
- 1976 Timur and His Squad as Olga, Zhenya's older sister
- 1977 Mimino as endocrinologists symposium organizer
- 1988 My Name is Harlequin as Harlequin's mother
- 1988 Actress from Gribov as Galina's sister
- 1989 Katala as Crucian's concubine
- 2008 The Ghost as episode
- 2008/2009 Glukhar (TV Series) as Natalya Glukharyova (46 episodes)
- 2013 Daddy's Daughters (TV Series) as Svetlana's mother-in-law
