= Armen Dzhigarkhanyan =

Armenian, Soviet actor

- Արմեն Ջիգարխանյան
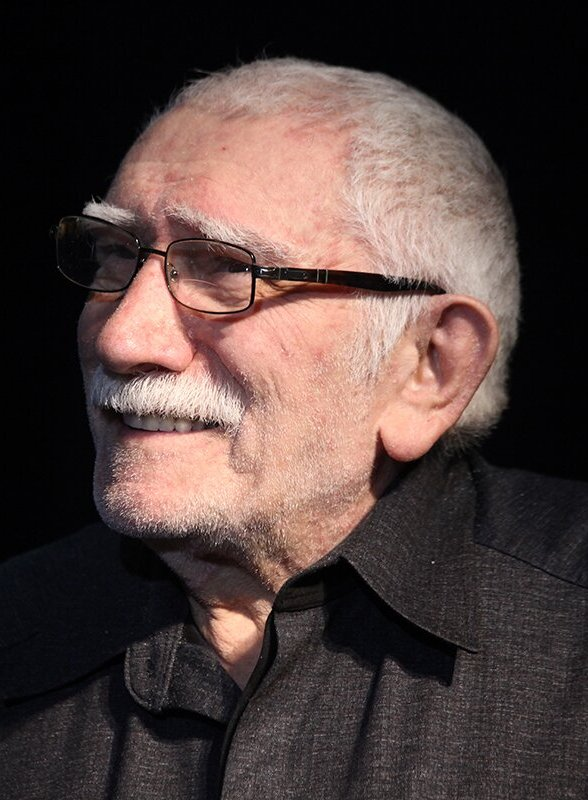
- Born: 3 October 1935; Yerevan, Armenian SSR, Soviet Union
- Died: 14 November 2020 (aged 85); Moscow, Russia
- Citizenship: Soviet Union, Russia, United States
- Occupations: Actor; theatre director
- Years active: 1955–2020
- Awards
- Armen Dzhigarkhanyan's voice (In Russian) Dzhigarkhanyan on the Echo of Moscow program, 30 December 2013
- Website: www.dzigartheater.ru

Armen Borisovich Dzhigarkhanyan (Note: Armenian: Արմեն Բորիսի Ջիգարխանյան, romanized: Armen Borisi J̌igarxanyan; Russian: Армен Борисович Джигарханян, romanized: Armen Borisovich Dzhigarkhanyan) (3 October 1935 – 14 November 2020) was a Soviet, Armenian, and Russian actor.

Born and raised in Yerevan, Dzhigarkhanyan started acting in the academic and Russian theaters of the city, before moving to Moscow to continue stage acting. Since 1960, he appeared in a number of Armenian films. He became popular in the 1970s with the various roles he portrayed in Soviet films like The New Adventures of the Elusive Avengers (1968), its sequel The Crown of the Russian Empire, or Once Again the Elusive Avengers (1971) and The Meeting Place Cannot Be Changed (1979). After almost 30 years on the stage of the Mayakovsky Theatre, Dzhigarkhanyan taught at VGIK and in 1996 he founded his own drama theater in Moscow.

With more than 250 appearances, Dzhigarkhanyan, one of the most renowned film and stage Armenian and Russian actors, appeared in more films than any other Russian actor.

== Early life ==
Armen Dzhigarkhanyan was born in Yerevan, Armenian SSR, Soviet Union on 3 October 1935. His paternal grandfather, a "professional tamada", came from an Armenian family from Tbilisi, Georgia's capital. He graduated from a Russian high school named after Anton Chekhov. Between 1953 and 1954, he worked as camera operator's assistant at the state-run Hayfilm studio.

== Career ==
=== Theater ===
==== Actor ====
In 1955, Dzhigarkhanyan was admitted to the Sundukyan State Academic Theatre. He studied in director Armen Gulakyan's (hy, ru) class until 1958. Beginning in his first year at the Sundukyan Theatre, he started acting at the Stanislavski Russian Theatre of Yerevan. He remained there for over 10 years, until 1967. At Armenia's only Russian theater, he played around 30 roles, most notably as Vanya Kudryash in The Storm by Alexander Ostrovsky, Sergey in An Irkutsk Story by Aleksei Arbuzov, Actor in The Lower Depths by Maxim Gorky. "From the beginning of his stage career, Dzhigarkhanyan has demonstrated an awesome versatility, succeeding in a wide variety of roles in the classical and contemporary repertory, including Shakespeare, Tennessee Williams, and modern Russian authors.

In 1967, Dzhigarkhanyan moved to Moscow to make a career at the Lenkom Theatre. He started acting under directorship of Anatoly Efros, however, they worked together for a brief period. Dzhigarkhanyan portrayed Molière in Mikhail Bulgakov's The Cabal of Hypocrites. Following Efros's departure, Dzhigarkhanyan was given more roles, but he didn't wish to continue acting in a theater without the director he came for in the first place.

In 1969, Dzhigarkhanyan joined Moscow's Mayakovsky Theatre at Andrey Goncharov's recommendation. He worked there until 1996 and for almost 30 years, he was "its leading actor". He first appeared in the role of Levinson in The Rout by Alexander Fadeyev. His later roles include Stanley Kowalski in Tennessee Williams's A Streetcar Named Desire. Since most of his roles were protagonistic, he moved to portray several antagonistic roles.

Dzhigarkhanyan's portrayal of Socrates in Edvard Radzinsky's Conversations with Socrates in 1975 was acclaimed by critics and made him one of the "most interesting and strongest actors of the contemporary scene." During the 1970s and 1980s, Dzhigarkhanyan appeared less frequently on stage and more frequently in films and became known to the wider Soviet public. Even with decreased number of appearances on stage, Dzhigarkhanyan's every role became an object of discussion. The finest roles from this period include Big Daddy in Cat on a Hot Tin Roof by Tennessee Williams, Lord Bothwell in Robert Bolt's Vivat! Vivat Regina!, Nero in Edvard Radzinsky's Theater in the Time of Nero and Seneca and others.

==== Director ====
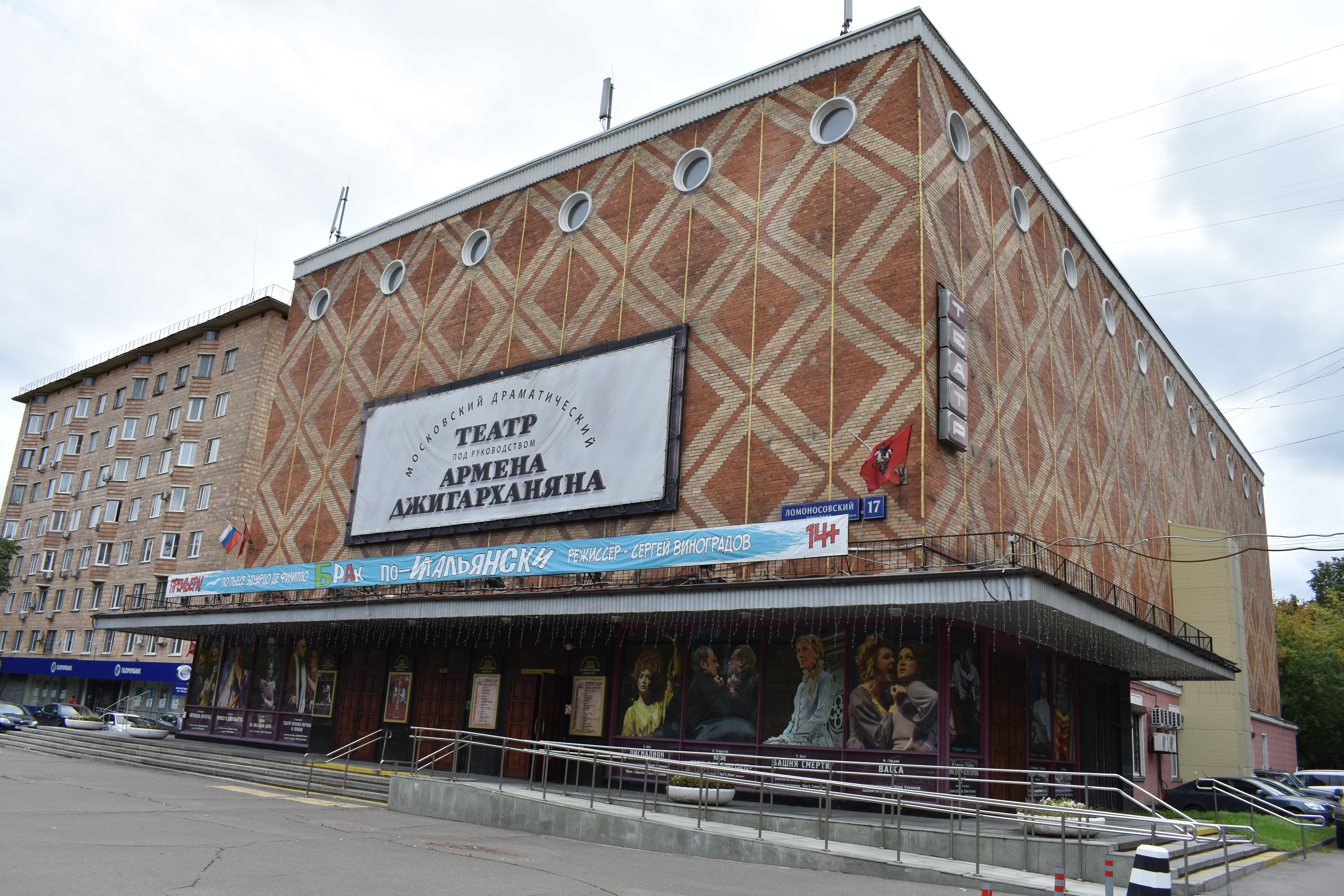
The Dzhigarkhanyan theater in Moscow

Between 1989 and 1997, Dzhigarkhanyan taught the Gerasimov Institute of Cinematography (VGIK), Russia's state film school.

In the mid-1990s, Dzhigarkhanyan decided to create a theater that would bring together his students at VGIK. In March 1996, Dzhigarkhanyan founded his own theater named "D" and currently named "Moscow Drama Theater headed by Armen Dzhigarkhanyan" (Московский драматический театр под руководством Армена Джигарханяна). His theater has staged a number of famous plays, including Samuel Beckett's Krapp's Last Tape and Harold Pinter's The Homecoming.

Dzhigarkhanyan has also directed combination companies and has played the roles of General in Fyodor Dostoevsky's The Gambler and the main character in Filumena Marturano by Eduardo De Filippo at the Lenkom Theatre.

=== Film ===
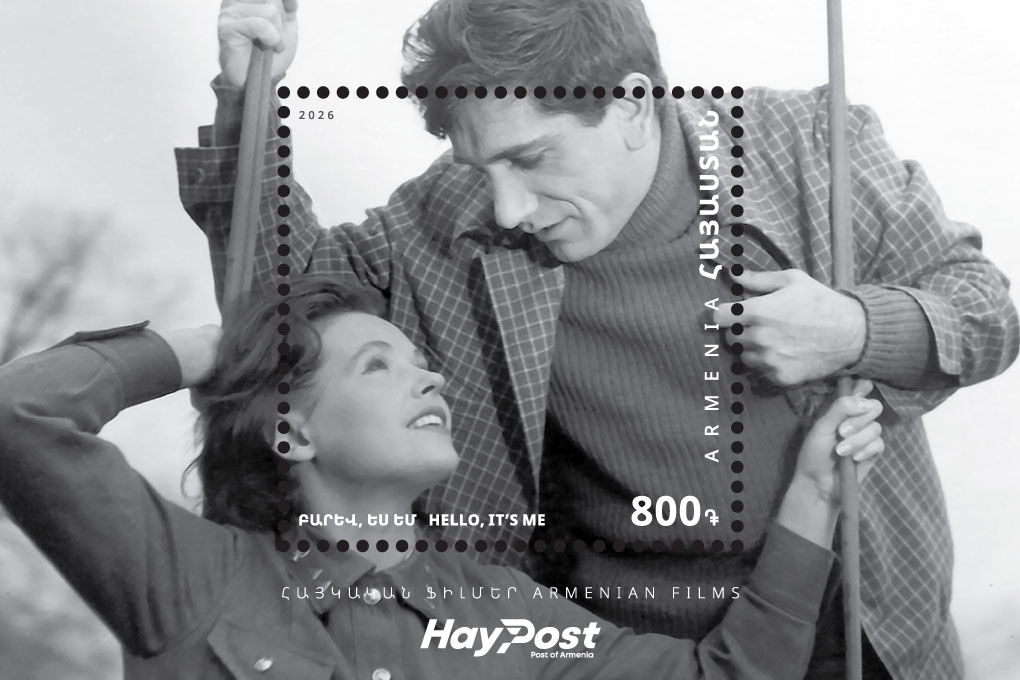
Dzhigarkhanyan in the 1966 film Hello, That's Me! on a 2026 stamp sheet of Armenia

Dzhigarkhanyan made his film debut in 1960 film Landslide (Obval) as Akop. He "impressed viewers with his inspired portrayal of physicist" in Frunze Dovlatyan's Hello, That's Me! (Barev Yes Em, 1966) as Artem Manvelyan. It "gave him national renown and initiated an extremely prolific screen career." Usta Mukuch, the role of an old blacksmith he created in Triangle (Yerankyuni, 1967) directed by famed Armenian director Henrik Malyan, paved the way for dozens of films in later decades.

He later appeared in several iconic films, including as captain Ovechkin in Edmond Keosayan's The New Adventures of the Elusive Avengers (1968) and The Crown of the Russian Empire, or Once Again the Elusive Avengers (1971). The 1973 comedy The Men, directed by Edmond Keosayan, became one of the most iconic Armenian films of the late Soviet period and today, a statue of its leading characters stands in central Yerevan. By the early 1970s, Dzhigarkhanyan had become one of the most popular Soviet film actor who appeared in more than 200 roles, covering all genres from situational comedy to historical adventure, psychological drama, thriller, and quality literary adaptation, moving effortlessly from trivial entertainment to sophisticated art. In the five-part TV miniseries The Meeting Place Cannot Be Changed (1979), starring all-time favorite Vladimir Vysotsky, Dzhigarkhanyan played a thief in law, which made him more popular to the general Soviet public. He also appeared in a leading role in the joint Soviet-French Teheran 43 (1981) alongside Claude Jade as his mysterious young mistress and Curd Jürgens as his lawyer.

== Political activity ==
In 2001, Dzhigarkhanyan signed a letter in defense of the NTV channel.

In 2012, during the presidential elections, Dzhigarkhanyan starred in a video in support of candidate Vladimir Putin; however, contrary to popular belief, he was not Putin’s confidant.

In March 2014, Dzhigarkhanyan condemned the annexation of Crimea, said "so far this will not bring us anything good," and refused to sign a letter in support of the annexation.

In 2017, Dzhigarkhanyan took part in municipal elections in Gagarinsky District, Moscow, for the United Russia party. According to the voting results, he took 5th place in the three-mandate district and did not receive a deputy mandate. All three mandates in the constituency where Armen Dzhigarkhanyan ran were won by representatives of the Yabloko party.

Dzhigarkhanyan advocated friendship between the Armenian and Azerbaijani peoples.

== Personal life ==
Dzhigarkhanyan was married three times. In the early 1960s, he secretly married Alla Vanovskaya, an actress at the Stanislavski Russian Theatre of Yerevan. Their daughter Yelena was born in 1964 and died at age 23 in 1987 of suffocation while asleep, because she left the car engine running. His second partner, Tatyana Vlasova, was also an actress at the Stanislavski Theatre in Yerevan. They never officially married, but they started living together in 1967, when they moved to Moscow together. Tatyana now resides in Dallas, Texas and works as a Russian language teacher at a university. Dzhigarkhanyan often visited her. His third wife is 43 years younger than him.

== Illness and death ==
In the last years of his life, Dzhigarkhanyan suffered from poor health. He was hospitalized in March 2016 and January 2018. In April 2018 he again was hospitalized after a heart attack and fell into a coma. Dzhigarkhanyan died in Moscow on November 14, 2020. The cause of death was cardiac arrest due to kidney failure and other chronic diseases. Presidents of Russia Vladimir Putin and Armenia Armen Sarkissian, Armenian Prime Minister Nikol Pashinyan and Moscow Mayor Sergey Sobyanin issued messages of condolence.

== Recognition ==
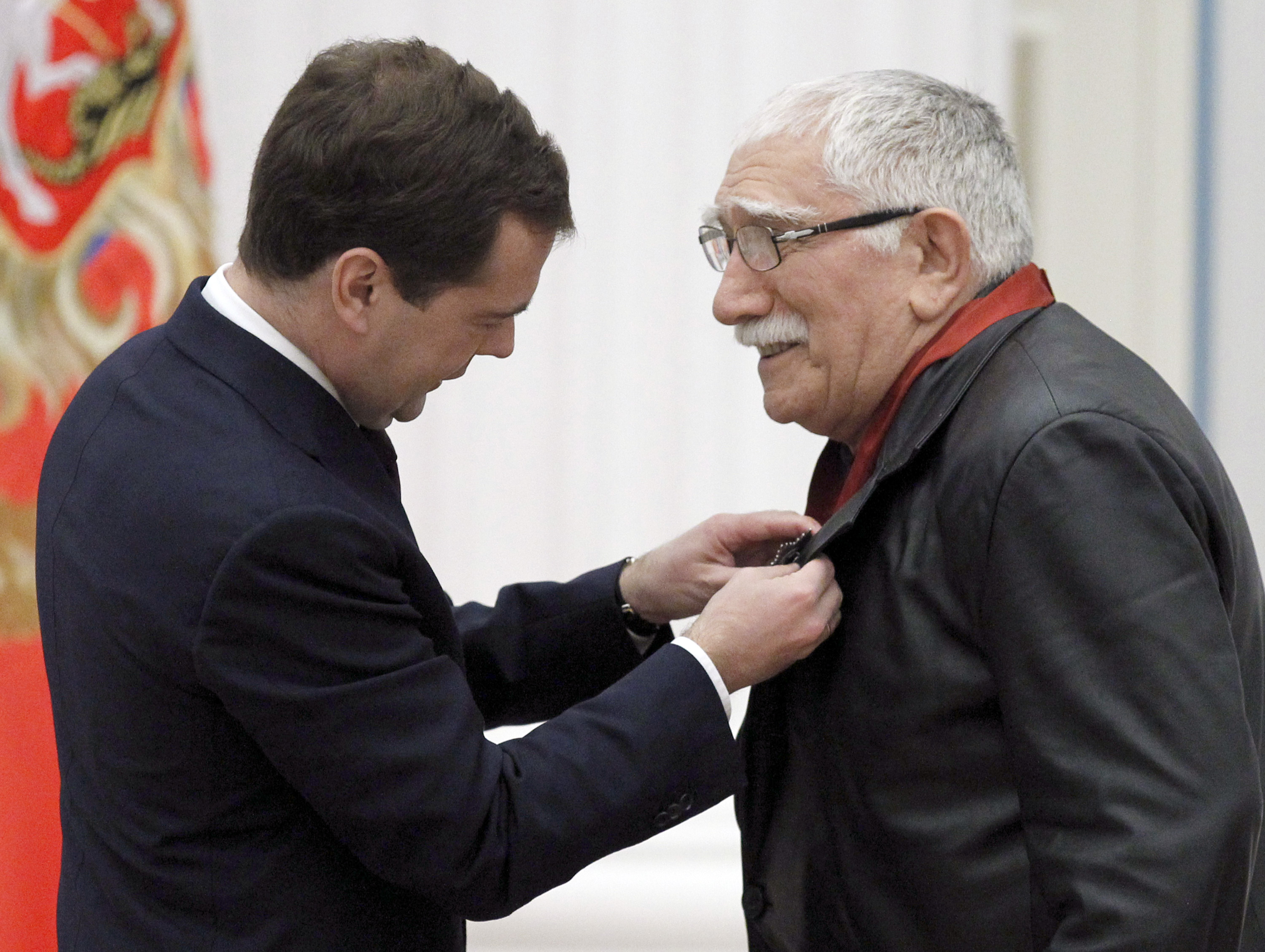
Dzhigarkhanyan awarded by Russian president Dmitry Medvedev, 2010

Dzhigarkhanyan was one of the most popular and renowned Russian actors of his generation, both in films and theatre. Novaya Gazeta, one of Russia's largest weeklies, described Dzhigarkhanyan as a "distinct brand" in Russian theatre and film and his voice as "a separate living brand". According to Peter Rollberg, Professor of Slavic Languages, Film Studies at the Elliott School of International Affairs, "Dzhigarkhanyan's characters usually are distinguished by stoicism, irony, and a quiet inner strength, irradiating a rough charm that has only grown with age."

With the deaths of Frunzik Mkrtchyan (1993), Khoren Abrahamyan (2004) and Sos Sargsyan (2013), Dzhigarkhanyan remained the last major Armenian actor of the Soviet era.

In his birthday congratulation in 2005, Armenia's second president Robert Kocharyan stated that Dzhigarkhanyan's "great popularity" is "due to [his] talent and devoted work". Kocharyan further said that "[his] art has become a peculiar standard of mutual enrichment of Armenian and Russian cultures." In 2010, Armenia's current president Serzh Sargsyan described the artist as "one of the prominent figures of the modern cinema" who has "boundless talent and charm". Sargsyan stated that "The Armenian nation is proud of you." In 2010, Russian president Dmitry Medvedev awarded Dzhigarkhanyan with the Order "For Merit to the Fatherland" and stated:

For decades, you've given the audience you talent and the appreciative audience responds to you with sincere love. You've played a number of memorable roles, each of which is an example of mastery of the profession. Today, inexhaustible creative energy, the ability to integrate talented people to help you in your work with the company of one of the most popular Moscow theaters in the education of the younger generation of domestic actors."

In 2012, Moscow Mayor Sergey Sobyanin congratulated Dzhigarkhanyan on his birthday and described him as "an outstanding actor and talented director" who "over many years of service to the stage and screen made a huge contribution to the development of Russian culture."

=== Record ===
A number of sources claim that Dzhigarkhanyan is included in Guinness World Records as the Russian actor with most film appearances (as of 2013), suggesting that he has played in more than 250 films (300 according to RIA Novosti). However, the Guinness World Records website does not provide such data by country. In reference to the large number of films in which he has appeared, prominent Soviet Armenian composer Aram Khachaturian once stated, "[Whenever] you turn on the iron, Dzhigarkhanyan is there!" Actor Valentin Gaft has written an epigram in a humorous reference to his large number of appearances: "There are less Armenians in the world, / Than there are films where Dzhigarkhanyan has appeared" (Гораздо меньше на земле армян, / Чем фильмов, где сыграл Джигарханян.)

=== Awards ===
Soviet Union

- People's Artist of the USSR (1985)

Russia

- People's Artist of the RSFSR (1973)
- Order "For Merit to the Fatherland", III class (1995)
- Order "For Merit to the Fatherland", IV class (2005)
- Order of Alexander Nevsky (2006)
- Crystal Turandot (Хрустальная Турандот), Highest Theater Prize of Moscow (2010)
- Order "For Merit to the Fatherland", II class (2010)

Armenia

- People's Artist of the Armenian SSR (1977)
- State Prize of the Armenian SSR (1975)
- State Prize of the Armenian SSR (1979)
- Order of St. Mesrop Mashtots (1996)
- Honorary Citizen of Yerevan (2001)
- Order of Honor of Armenia (2010)

== Selected filmography ==
Year	Film	Role	Note
1966	Hello, That's Me! (Здравствуй, это я!)	Artyom Manvelyan	
1967	Triangle (Треугольник)	Usta Mukuch	
1968	The New Adventures of the Elusive Avengers (Новые приключения Неуловимых)	Captain Ovechkin	
1971	The Crown of the Russian Empire, or Once Again the Elusive Avengers (Корона Российской Империи, или Снова Неуловимые)	Captain Ovechkin	
1972	The Seagull (Чайка)	Ilya Afanasievich Shamraev	
1973	The Men (Мужчины)	Ghazaryan	
1975	Hello, I'm Your Aunt! (Здравствуйте, я ваша тётя!)	Judge Criggs	
1976	When September comes (Когда наступает сентябрь)	Levon Pogosyan	
1978	The Dog in the Manger (Собака на сене)	Tristan	
1979	The Meeting Place Cannot Be Changed (Место встречи изменить нельзя)	Hunchback	
1980	Rafferty (Рафферти)	Tommy Farichetti	
1981	Teheran 43 (Тегеран 43)	Max Richars	
1982	Gikor (Гикор)	Bazaz Artem	
1986	The Dolphin's Cry	steward	
1988	The 13th Apostle	David	
1989	Two Arrows. Stone Age Detective (Две стрелы. Детектив каменного века)	Head of the tribe	
1990	Passport (Паспорт)	Semyon Klein	
1992	Weather Is Good on Deribasovskaya, It Rains Again on Brighton Beach (На Дерибасовской хорошая погода, или На Брайтон-Бич опять идут дожди)	Katz	
1992	White King, Red Queen (Белый король, красная королева)	Makeev	
1993	Dreams (Сны)	Doctor	
1995	What a Mess! (Ширли-мырли)	Kozyulski	
2008	The Best Movie (Самый лучший фильм)	God's secretary	
2008	God's Smile or The Odessa Story (Улыбка Бога, или Чисто одесская история)	Filipp Olshansky	
2009	O Lucky Man! (О, счастливчик!)	Grandfather Ramiz	
2009	Hamlet. XXI Century (Гамлет. XXI век)	Gravedigger	

Voice

- Once Upon a Dog (Жил-был пёс, 1982) — The Wolf
- Formula of Love (Формула любви, 1984) — Count Cagliostro (played by Nodar Mgaloblishvili)
- Treasure Island (Остров сокровищ, 1988) — John Silver
- Grey Wolf and Little Red Riding Hood (Серый Волк энд Красная Шапочка, 1990) — Grey Wolf
- Cars (Тачки, 2006) — Doc Hudson (Russian dub)
- Up (Вверх, 2009) — Carl Fredricksen (Russian dub)
- Alisa Knows What to Do! (Алиса знает, что делать!, 2013–2016) — Vasily Petrovich, robot teacher (first episodes)
