= Eduard Abalov =

Soviet film actor and director

- Эдуард Абалян
- Born: Eduard Gaikovich Abalov; 7 October 1927; Tbilisi, Georgian SSR, Soviet Union (now Georgia)
- Died: 5 August 1987 (aged 59); Canada
- Education: Gerasimov Institute of Cinematography
- Occupations: actor, filmmaker
- Years active: 1955–1987

Eduard Gaikovich Abalov (Abalyan) (Russian: Эдуа́рд Га́йкович Аба́лов (Абаля́н), Armenian: Էդուարդ Աբալյան); 7 October 1927 – 5 August 1987) was a Soviet film actor and director.

== Filmography ==
=== As director ===
- At a Quiet Harbor (1958)
- At a Far Point (1970)
- Northern Rhapsody (1974)

=== As actor ===
- Clean Ponds (1965) as officer
- The Cook (1966) as scammer in the market
- The New Adventures of the Elusive Avengers (1968) as officer
- Train Stop – Two Minutes (1972) as train passenger
- Northern Rhapsody (1974) as Gurgen Khachaturovich
- The Twelve Chairs (1976) as barbeque chef
