= Black Devil =

Black Devil may refer to:

== Military ==
- The Black Devils or First Special Service Force, a military unit during World War II
- 370th Infantry Regiment (United States) or Black Devils, an African-American regiment in World War I
- Erich Hartmann or the Black Devil, a German World War II fighter pilot

== Other uses ==
- Black Devil (cigarette), a Dutch brand
- The Black Devil (film), a 1957 Italian adventure film
- Black Devil Disco Club, an electronic disco music project

== See also ==
- Red Devil (disambiguation)
- White devil (disambiguation)
- Royal Winnipeg Rifles or the Little Black Devils
