= Sándor Kallós =

Russian composer

Sándor Kallós Шандор Каллош
- Also known as: Shandor Kallosh, Aleksandr Kallosh
- Born: October 23, 1935 (age 90); Chernivtsi, Ukrainian SSR, Soviet Union
- Died: 18.01.2026
- Genres: Minimalism, early music, electronic music
- Occupation: Composer

Sándor Kallós (Note: Hungarian: Kallós Sándor; Russian: Шандор (Александр) Эрнестович Каллош, romanized: Shandor (Aleksandr) Ernestovich Kallosh; Ukrainian: Шандор Ернестович Каллош, romanized: Shandor Ernestovych Kallosh) (23 October 1935 - 18 January 2026) was a composer, a noted proponent of minimal music, an influential pioneer of the early music revival and electronic music in the USSR, lutenist, and a prolific author of incidental music for film, animation, theater, and ballet.

== Biography ==
Sándor Kallós was born on 23 October 1935 in Chernivtsi, Ukrainian SSR, Soviet Union. He matriculated from the Lviv Conservatory in 1961, having studied composition under Adam Sołtys. His graduate studies were at Moscow Conservatory (class of Yuri Shaporin, 1962–1964). In 1954-1963, he worked as a violinist in various symphony orchestras. From 1971, he appeared as a lutenist (notably as the accompanist to Karina, Ruzanna and Pavel Lisitsian), and from 1975 as a conductor. Kallós is of Hungarian descent.

== List of works ==
=== Sacred works ===
- "5 Hymns & Halleluiah from Byzantine Hermologe" (in Classical Greek) for soloists, chorus a capella and tape.
- "Credo" for viola d'amore and 6-channell electronics.
- "Sacred Chamber Music on Catalan Themes from the 17th century".
- "David's Psalms" (in Classical Greek) for voice and lute.

=== Secular works ===
==== Symphonic works ====
- 1st Symphony (1957),
- 2nd Symphony (1960),
- 3rd Symphony (1961),
- 4th Symphony (1976),
- Violin Concerto #1 (1964),
- Violin Concerto #2 (1969);
- Concerto for viola, double bass and оrch. (1977);

=== Instrumental music ===
- 5 Pieces for Lute, Theremin and tape
- "Dialoghi" for viola d'amore and tape
- 3 Ricercari (Три ричеркара) for viola solo

=== Incidental music (theater) ===
- "Merlin"
- "St. Petersburg Tales"

==== Ballets ====
- "Macbeth"
- "Faust"
- "A Wedding Voyage"
- "The Princess of the Moon"
- "Alice in Wonderland"
- "Antigone"
- "Dances of Death"

==== Operas ====
- "Kupriyanov and Natasha"
- "Daphne"
- "Darling Giaccomina"
- "Royal Games"

=== Film music ===
- Island (short) (1973)
- I Give You This Star (1974)
- The Red Apple (1975)
- Border dog Alyi (1979)
- A Few Things From the Provincial Life (1983)
- A Lady's Visit (1989)
- I'm again with You
- Wild Love
- A Princess and the Beans (1997)
- Dandelion Wine (1997)
- Evil's Allure (2006)
- Hoffmaniada (2018)
