= Edmond Keosayan =

Armenian Soviet film director and musician

- Born: Edmond Gareginovich Keosayan; 9 October 1936; Leninakan, Armenian SSR, USSR (now Gyumri, Armenia)
- Died: 21 April 1994 (aged 57); Moscow, Russia
- Resting place: Kuntsevo Cemetery
- Occupations: Director, screenwriter
- Years active: 1962—1988
- Notable work: The Elusive Avengers (1966); The New Adventures of the Elusive Avengers (1968); The Crown of the Russian Empire, or Once Again the Elusive Avengers (1971)
- Spouse: Laura Gevorgyan
- Children: David Keosayan (1961—2022); Tigran Keosayan (1966—2025)

Edmond Gareginovich Keosayan (Armenian: Էդմոնդ Գարեգինի Քյոսայան, romanized: Edmond Garegini K’yosayan; Russian: Эдмонд Гарегинович Кеосаян; 9 October 1936 – 21 April 1994) was an Armenian Soviet film director and musician. He was also a compere of the Soviet State Variety Orchestra. His films are mainly in the Armenian and Russian languages.

== Biography ==
Born on October 9, 1936 in the city of Leninakan, Armenian SSR, into an Armenian family. In 1937, the father was repressed, and the mother and children were exiled to Altai. The family was able to return to Yerevan after 1945. From 1952-54, he worked in a Yerevan watch factory. 1954-56 — studied in Plekhanov Moscow Institute of Economy. From 1956-58, he studied in Yerevan State Institute of Theatre and Cinematography, where he worked as a compere. In 1964, he graduated from the Directing Department of VGIK (Efim Dzigan's master class) and then became a director at Mosfilm Studio. He occasionally worked at Armenfilm Studio.

He died on 21 April 1994 and was buried in the Kuntsevo Cemetery.

== Honors ==
- Honored Artist of the RSFSR (1976)
- Honored Artist of the Armenian SSR (1976)
- Honored Artist of the Georgian SSR (1980)
- People's Artist of the Armenian SSR (1987)
- Lenin Komsomol Prize (1968)
- KinoWatson Grand Prize (2009, posthumously)

== Filmography ==
- 1964: Why Are You Quiet Maxim?
- 1965: The Cook
- 1966: The Elusive Avengers
- 1968: The New Adventures of the Elusive Avengers
- 1971: The Crown of the Russian Empire or Once again the Elusive Avengers
- 1973: Tghamardik (The Men)
- 1975: The Canyon of Deserted Tales
- 1975: When September Comes
- 1978: Huso Astgh
- 1980: Legend of the Clown
- 1982: The Oriole Is Crying Somewhere
- 1988: The Ascent

The Men is commemorated by a statue in Yerevan.

== Edmond Keosayan Award ==
Edmond Keosayan Award for Excellence in Cardiology has been awarded since 2001 to outstanding young investigators who made high quality scientific research in either clinical or fundamental cardiology, during Young Medics International Conference, organized biannually in Yerevan by Armenian Medical Association. The winner for each category receives $2,000 from the Edmond Keosayan Foundation. The award was first awarded in 2008 during 4th YMIC, the money being shared between two candidates. The award was established by his son, film director and propagandist Tigran Keosayan, as an expression of respect for lifelong friendship between Edmond Keosayan and Parounak Zelveian, his cardiologist and now the president of Armenian Medical Association.
