= The Crown of the Russian Empire, or Once Again the Elusive Avengers =

- DVD cover
- Directed by: Edmond Keosayan
- Starring: Viktor Kosykh; Valentina Kurdyukova; Michael Metyolkin
- Production company: Mosfilm
- Release date: 1971
- Country: Soviet Union
- Language: Russian

The Crown of the Russian Empire, or Once Again the Elusive Avengers (Russian: Корона Российской Империи, или Снова Неуловимые; translit. Korona Rossiyskoy Imperii, ili Snova Neulovimye) is a 1971 Soviet historical action adventure movie, a second sequel of The Elusive Avengers, directed by Edmond Keosayan and made by Mosfilm.

== Synopsis ==
The Elusive Avengers, a posse of young Red Partisans, including Valerka, a former schoolboy, Yashka, a devil-may-care Romani, and two orphan siblings, Danka and his sister Ksanka, became Cheka agents after successfully stealing the map in The New Adventures of the Elusive Avengers. They wish to abandon their service and study in a university, but the young Soviet Republic needs them again. A group of White émigrés, influenced by a scheming French politician, Monsieur Duc, want to crown a new Tsar in Paris. Two obvious frauds compete for the Russian throne in exile, but they want to be crowned with the real Crown of the Russian emperors.

The White émigrés form a team that will infiltrate the Soviet Union and steal the crown from the museum. Old "friends" from the previous movies, Ataman Burnash, Stabs Captain Ovechkin, and Colonel Kudasov, prepare to enter the USSR along with the notorious thief Naryshkin, a "specialist" who will steal the crown. However, Kudasov tries to double-cross his accomplices and is wounded by a gunshot. Ovechkin becomes the team's leader.

The émigrés return to the USSR, but Naryshkin is accidentally arrested by police. The Cheka doesn't want them to flee, and Yashka, disguised as a pick-pocket, is put in Naryshkin's cell and arranges his escape. He gains Naryshkin's trust and enters the gang. They enter the museum at night, only to find the crown stolen by Ovechkin.

Ovechkin flees Moscow by train. Ksanka pursues him, but loses the trail when he hides in the catacombs of Odessa. He is waiting to be picked up by a ship and successfully escape with the crown. Danka and Valerka immediately go to Paris, where they learn that Monsieur Duc actually didn't want to use the crown for the coronation. Instead, Duc wanted to sell it for millions of dollars. After Kudasov reveals that, he is shot by his former aide, Lieutenant Perov, who now works for Monsieur Duc along with Ovechkin.

Duc's minions, led by Perov, hijack a ship to pick up Ovechkin and carry the crown to Cape Town. Unfortunately, Danka and Valerka are aboard. When the ship picks up Ovechkin and the crown, Yashka, Ksanka, and Naryshkin board it to thwart Perov's plan. Ovechkin, outnumbered and outgunned by the Chekists, tries to throw the crown into the sea, but Naryshkin steals it and hands it to the Avengers.

== Cast ==
- Viktor Kosykh - Danka Shchus
- Valentina Kurdyukova - Ksanka Shchus
- Vasiliy Vasilev - Yashka the Gypsy
- Michael Metyolkin - Valerka Meshcheryakov
- Ivan Pereverzev - Smirnov, department head of Cheka
- Yefim Kopelyan - chieftain Ignat Burnash
- Armen Dzhigarkhanyan - Former captain Petr S. Ovechkin
- Arkady Tolbuzin - Former colonel Leopold S. Kudasov
- Vladimir Ivashov - Former lieutenant Perov
- Vladislav Strzhelchik - "Prince" Naryshkin, a professional burglar
- Vladimir Belokurov - "shaggy" impostor to the role of the Emperor of Russia
- Rolan Bykov - "bald" impostor to the role of the Emperor of Russia
- Yan Frenkel - Louis / Leonid, garzon, former violinist of the restaurant (voice by Artyom Karapetyan)
- Lyudmila Gurchenko - Agrafena Zavolzhskaya, chansonnier from the restaurant
- Andrei Fajt - Mr. Duke
- Grigory Shpigel as photographer
- Nina Agapova as american lady with parrot
- Yakov Lenz as old man who knew everything
