= Viktor Kosykh =

- Born: 27 January 1950; Alapayevsk, Soviet Union
- Died: 22 December 2011 (aged 61); Moscow, Russia
- Resting place: Khovanskoye Cemetery

Viktor Ivanovich Kosykh (Russian: Виктор Иванович Косых; January 27, 1950 – December 22, 2011) was a Soviet and Russian theater and cinema actor. He is probably best known for the role of Danko Schusya in the famous film The Elusive Avengers and in its sequels, The New Adventures of the Elusive Avengers and The Crown of the Russian Empire, or Once Again the Elusive Avengers.

He is buried at the Khovanskoye Cemetery.

== Partial filmography ==
- Welcome, or No Trespassing (Russian: Добро пожаловать, или Посторонним вход воспрещён, 1964) as Kostya Inochkin
- Father of a Soldier (Отец солдата, 1964) as Vasya
- They're Calling, Open the Door (Звонят, откройте дверь, 1966) as Genka Dresvyannikov
- The Elusive Avengers (Неуловимые мстители, 1967) as Danka Shchus
- The New Adventures of the Elusive Avengers (Новые приключения Неуловимых, 1968) as Danka Shchus
- The Crown of the Russian Empire, or Once Again the Elusive Avengers (Корона Российской Империи, или Снова Неуловимые, 1971) as Danka Shchus
- With You and Without You (С тобой и без тебя, 1974) as Militiaman
- The Tavern on Pyatnitskaya (Трактир на Пятницкой, 1978) as Lyonka, bandit
- Front Beyond the Front Line (Фронт за линией фронта, 1978) as The soldier
- Od içinda (1978) as Andrey
- Border dog Alyi (Пограничный пёс Алый, 1980) as Captain Eliseev
- Anxious Sunday (Тревожное воскресенье, 1983) as Kolya
- The Cold Summer of 1953 (Холодное лето пятьдесят третьего, 1988) as Baklan, criminal
- Anarchy (Анархия, 1989) as Prisoner
