= Boris Sichkin =

- Born: Boris Mikhailovich Sichkin; August 15, 1922; Kyiv, Ukrainian SSR, Soviet Union
- Died: March 21, 2002 (aged 79); New York City, U.S.
- Occupations: Actor, dancer, choreographer, composer, entertainer
- Years active: 1937–2002
- Awards: Medal "For the Victory over Germany in the Great Patriotic War 1941–1945"

Boris Mikhailovich Sichkin (Ukrainian: Бори́с Миха́йлович Сі́чкін; Russian: Бори́с Миха́йлович Си́чкин; 1922–2002) was a Soviet and American film actor, dancer, choreographer, composer and entertainer.

== Biography ==
Sichkin was born in Kyiv into the family of a Jewish shoemaker, who died when he was 4 years old. The elder brother taught Boris dances and performances, according to the memoirs, his first performances took place at the Jewish market in front of some criminals who used to assemble there. After escaping from the house he was expelled from school. In 1937–1941 he studied at the Kyiv Ballet School, and danced in the P. Virsky Ukrainian National Folk Dance Ensemble.

He participated in World War II.

He participated in the work of the theater of Arts, bandleader Eddie Rosner. His most memorable film roles are as coupletist Buba Kastorsky in The Elusive Avengers and its sequel and as Leonid Brezhnev in the American epic historical film Nixon.

In 1973, in Tambov, he was arrested on suspicion of theft of state property in a large scale. A year later was released. The investigation lasted several years. In the end, Boris Sichkin was finally acquitted.

In 1979 he left to the United States. Member of the editorial board of the New York City Russian newspaper “Russian Bazaar”.

== Death ==
He died on March 21, 2002, of a heart attack in his apartment in New York City. Soon, at the request of his wife, Sichkin's remains were recovered from the grave and cremated, and the urn with the ashes moved to Moscow.

== Filmography ==
- Goodbye, Boys (1964) as Entertainer
- The Elusive Avengers (1966) as Buba Kastorsky
- The New Adventures of the Elusive Avengers (1968) as Buba Kastorsky
- At War as at War (1968) as Selivanov
- Barbara the Fair with the Silken Hair (1969) as Groom-Prestidigitator
- The Golden Horns (1972) as Dandellion the Robber
- Incorrigible Liar (1973) as Prince of Burukhtania's translator
- The Final Days (1989) as Leonid Brezhnev
- Nixon (1995) as Leonid Brezhnev
- Poor Sasha (1997) as Aristarkh Lvovich Rastopchin
- World War III (1998) as General Vladimir Ulyanovich Soshkin
- Third Watch (2001) as Uri (Episode "After Time")
