= God's Smile or The Odessa Story =

- Russian: Улыбка Бога, или Чисто одесская история
- Directed by: Vladimir Alenikov
- Written by: Vladimir Alenikov; Georgiy Golubenko
- Produced by: Valeryi Gorelov; Alina Shraybman
- Starring: Ivan Zhidkov; Mariya Gorban; Antonina Sutyagina; Armen Dzhigarkhanyan; Dmitriy Sergin
- Cinematography: Kirill Davidoff
- Edited by: Vladimir Alenikov
- Music by: Igor Zubkov
- Release date: 2008
- Country: Russia
- Language: Russian

God's Smile or The Odessa Story (Russian: Улыбка Бога, или Чисто одесская история, romanized: Ulybka Boga, ili Chisto odesskaya istoriya) is a 2008 Russian comedy film directed by Vladimir Alenikov.

== Plot ==
The film tells about the rich old Odessa citizen Philip Olshansky, who is preparing for death and preparing a will. To help him, his grandson Allen goes to Odessa, where he will find a lot of adventures.

== Cast ==
- Ivan Zhidkov as Alen
- Mariya Gorban
- Antonina Sutyagina as Pozhila Anna
- Armen Dzhigarkhanyan as Filipp Olshansky
- Dmitriy Sergin as Molodoy Filipp
- Roman Kartsev as Perepmuter
- Tamara Tana as Elvira
- Aleksandr Pankratov-Chyorny as Ryzhak
- Nina Usatova as Madam Parnokopytenko
- Tatyana Novik as Galya
