= White devil =

White devil may refer to:

- The White Devil, a 1612 tragedy by John Webster
- The White Devil (1930 film), a German film directed by Alexandre Volkoff
- The White Devil (1947 film), an Italian film directed by Nunzio Malasomma
- "The White Devil" (Dark), a 2019 TV episode
- Gundam (fictional robot), nicknamed "White Devil", a fictional piloted robot in the anime Mobile Suit Gundam
- "White Devil", a 2004 song by Alexisonfire from Watch Out!
- White Devils, a 2004 novel by Paul J. McAuley

== See also ==
- Foreign Devil (disambiguation)
- Black Devil (disambiguation)
- Red Devil (disambiguation)
- Div-e Sepid (lit. 'white demon'), the chieftain of divs (demons) from the Persian epic Shahnameh
- "White Demon Love Song", from The Twilight Saga: New Moon (2009)
- Ricky Marvin (born 1980), ring name "White Demon", Mexican professional wrestler
