= Northern Rhapsody =

- Russian: Северная рапсодия
- Directed by: Eduard Abalov
- Written by: Yevgeny Chernetsky
- Produced by: Mikhail Babakhanov; Vladimir Karev
- Starring: Lyudmila Gavrilova; Leonid Kuravlyov; Stanislav Chekan
- Cinematography: Vitaly Abramov
- Music by: Valentin Levashov
- Production company: Mosfilm
- Release date: November 4, 1974
- Running time: 80 min.
- Country: Soviet Union
- Language: Russian

Northern Rhapsody (Russian: Северная рапсодия, romanized: Severnaya rapsodiya) is a Soviet musical feature film directed by Eduard Abalov in 1974.

== Plot ==
The girl Tonya lives in the Far North near Cape Oleniy Nos and loves to dance. She receives from Ivan Tsarevich as a gift a magic ring with a supply of energy for three wishes. Having become the laureate of the regional amateur show, Tonya receives an invitation to the entrance exam in the famous metropolitan song and dance ensemble. Tony's father is against his daughter's hobby, considering dancing a frivolous activity. He prevents her from leaving.

Tonya goes to Moscow on skis in a blizzard. The road turns out to be difficult. Tonya rubs the ring and calls the polar aircraft. Polar pilot Ivan Ladeykin helps the girl get to Moscow.

In Moscow, Tonya goes to the exam and finds out that the competition is very big (103 people per seat). The girl is shy, but Ladeikin encourages her. Tony's father flies to Moscow for his daughter to bring her home. Tonya is looking for Ladeykin, who has left to speak on television. Ladeykin, in his interview, shows a photograph of Tonya, tells her story and encourages the audience to take the girl by the hand and take her to the exam.

After the TV show, Muscovites rush in search of the girl. Tonya dances in the exam. At the end of the film, Tonya becomes the soloist of the ensemble and performs on the stage of the Palace of Congresses.

== Cast ==
- Lyudmila Gavrilova as Tonya Sevastyanova
- Leonid Kuravlyov as Ivan Ladeykin
- Stanislav Chekan as Karp Sevastyanov, Tonya's father
- Grigory Shpigel as Gleb Petrovich Churilin
- Yevgeny Morgunov as taxi driver
- Georgy Vitsin as Kuzma Petrovich
- Nina Agapova as correspondent
- Eduard Abalov as Gurgen Khachaturovich
- Anatoly Kubatsky as hockey fan
- Irina Murzaeva as hockey fan
- Valentina Leontieva as TV presenter
