= The Elusive Avengers =

- Film poster
- Directed by: Edmond Keosayan
- Written by: Edmond Keosayan; Sergei Yermolinsky
- Based on: Red Devils by Pavel Blyakhin
- Produced by: Mosfilm
- Starring: Viktor Kosykh; Mikhail Metyolkin; Vasily Vasilyev; Valentina Kurdyukova; Yefim Kopelyan; Boris Sichkin
- Cinematography: Fyodor Dobronravov
- Edited by: Lyudmila Yelyan
- Music by: Boris Mokrousov
- Release date: 29 April 1967
- Running time: 77 minutes
- Country: Soviet Union
- Language: Russian

The Elusive Avengers (Russian: Неуловимые мстители, translit. Neulovimye mstiteli) is a 1967 Soviet action adventure film by Mosfilm. Directed by Edmond Keosayan, the screenplay by Keosayan and Sergei Yermolinsky is loosely based on the novel Red Devils by Pavel Blyakhin, which was previously adapted in 1923. The film is an example of Ostern, set in Russia during the Russian Civil War of 1917-1923.

Two sequels, both also directed by Keosayan, followed, The New Adventures of the Elusive Avengers (1968) and The Crown of the Russian Empire, or Once Again the Elusive Avengers (1971).

== Synopsis ==
The film is a screening of a story about four youngsters who become heroes of the Red Army in the Russian Civil War.

May 1920. Danka Shchus, orphaned son of a Red revolutionary sailor, whose father was tortured and executed by the warlord Sidor Lyuty before his eyes, and his sister Ksanka join Valerka, a former schoolboy, and Yashka, a devil-may-care gypsy.

The informal White Army bandits (Cossacks of the anarchist Ataman Gnat Burnash) who are requisitioning cattle from the villagers of Zbruyevka. The ataman demagogically speaks to a local peasant woman about freedom that must be paid for, and falsely promises to eventually return a dozen cows to her private ownership. At night the four youngsters, who succeed by never forgetting their pledge of mutual assistance and calling themselves Avengers, use the superstitions of the Cossacks, scare the convoy with homemade "ghosts" and drive the cattle back to the village, including returning the cow to the peasant woman. The scene he saw so impresses the harmless White man - Ilyukha Verekhov, that throughout the rest of the film he tells the story of the dead on the night road in various companies, but almost no one believes him. All schemes of Burnash seem to go wrong, sabotaged by unseen and unidentified enemies. The mischievous culprits always leave a note signed '- the Elusive Avengers'. They are so effective, in fact, that reports of their deeds are reaching the local division of the Red Army.

The artist Buba Kastorsky from Odessa performs a tap dance to the music of a two-step on the farm. Men from Burnash's detachment like the performance of the visiting singer. Sidor Lyuty identifies Danka but doesn’t go for further conflict and treats him to some kvass drink, but for insulting his murdered father, Danka throws a ladle of kvass at Lyuty, for which Sidor gives a whipping to Danka. Danka returns to his team, but sends his sister to the village for reconnaissance. She is captured by the Cossacks, and Sidor Lyuty assigns her as a servant to a tavern. There, a party started by bandits takes place, but Yashka the gypsy entertains and gets the Sidor Lyuty's squad drunk. Avengers and the artist Buba Kastorsky, who has joined them, carry out reprisals against the drunk White. However, Sidor Lyuty escapes by jumping from the second floor of the tavern onto his horse. Danka goes after him and shoots his offender with a revolver and, as it seems to him, kills the White commander.

The cavalrymen of the First Cavalry Army are shown. A Red Army soldier with accordion is singing a tragicomic song about Satan, who came to a soldier's wife and accidentally started a family with her. Soldier reports to Commander Semyon Budyonny about the liberation of Zbruyevka by a detachment of Avengers, however, nothing is known about them.

Avengers attack a carriage and kill a Cossack teenager, who was traveling with a letter to Ataman Burnash to serve him. Danka decides to pass himself off as the dead man, assuming that there is no one to identify him. There he spends about two weeks, engaged in subversive activities (this is mentioned in the dialogue between two white commanders). Sidor Lyuty, who was in fact only wounded, recognizes Danka, denouncing him, but Burnash believes not him, but the documents. When the old Cossack himself arrives, the deception is revealed, Danka is arrested. Valerka and Yashka rescue him. Danka manages to take revenge on Sidor, flogging him, at gunpoint. Suddenly, the Red Army begins an attack on the camp, some of the Whites flee. The Avengers escape on a train freed from capture, crossing the burning bridge to their people (it is unclear how Ksanka got there, she did not participate in the last operation). Avengers kill several Whites pursuing them, including Sidor Lyuty.

At the end of the movie, the Avengers are honored and acknowledged by S.M. Budyonny himself, he meets the Avengers and accepts them into ranks of the Red Army. They ride off into the rising sun, ready to answer their army's call.

== Cast ==
- Viktor Kosykh – Danka Shchus
- Valentina Kurdyukova – Ksanka Shchus
- Vasily Vasilyev – Yashka the Gypsy
- Mikhail Metyolkin – Valerka Meshcheryakov
- Yefim Kopelyan – chieftain Ignat Burnash
- Vladimir Treshchalov – chieftain Sidor Lyuty (voiced by Yevgeny Vesnik)
- Boris Sichkin – Buba Kastorsky, actor and singer
- Lev Sverdlin – Semyon Budyonny
- Vladimir Belokurov – bandit, named "holy father-philosopher"
- Gennadi Yukhtin – Ignat, bandit, Sidor Lyuty's helper
- Inna Churikova – Blond Jozie, singer
- Gleb Strizhenov – father Mokiy
- Savely Kramarov – Ilyukha Verekhov, cross-eyed bandit

== Differences from the original ==
- In the book, the "ethnic minority" character was Chinese circus acrobat Yu-Yu. The 1923 adaptation replaced him with a black boy, Tom Jackson, a move very popular in early Soviet cinema to display Soviet internationalism (compare Circus or Flight to the Moon). The Elusive Avengers, filmed in Cold War era, by contrast, avoided references to the United States and replaced the obviously propagandistic black Tom with the more realistic romani Yashka.
