= The Cook (1965 film) =

- Russian: Стряпуха
- Directed by: Edmond Keosayan
- Written by: Anatoly Sofronov
- Starring: Svetlana Svetlichnaya; Lyudmila Khityaeva; Inna Churikova; Konstantin Sorokin; Georgi Yumatov
- Cinematography: Fyodor Dobronravov
- Edited by: P. Chechyotkina
- Music by: Boris Mokrousov
- Production company: Mosfilm
- Release date: 1965
- Running time: 71 min.
- Country: Soviet Union
- Language: Russian

The Cook (Russian: Стряпуха, romanized: Stryapukha) is a 1965 Soviet romantic comedy film directed by Edmond Keosayan.

== Plot ==
A beautiful cook girl comes to one Kuban collective farm and immediately attracts the attention of many men who begin to look after her. But only one of them she reciprocates.

== Cast ==
- Svetlana Svetlichnaya as Pavlina Khutornaya
- Lyudmila Khityaeva as Galina Sakhno
- Georgi Yumatov as Serafim Ivanovich Chaika
- Ivan Savkin as Stepan Kazanets
- Vladimir Vysotsky as Andrey
- Inna Churikova as Varvara
- Konstantin Sorokin as Sliva
- Lyudmila Marchenko as Taisya
- Zoya Fyodorova as head of crooks in the market
- Sergey Filippov as crook in the market
- Valery Nosik as Gregory, Varvara's husband
- Eduard Abalov as crook in the market
