= Red devil cichlid =

Red devil cichlid is a common name for several fishes and may refer to:

- Amphilophus labiatus, endemic to Lake Managua and Lake Nicaragua in Nicaragua
- Amphilophus citrinellus, endemic to the San Juan River and adjacent watersheds in Costa Rica and Nicaragua

== See also ==
- Red Devil (disambiguation)
