= The Men (statue) =

Sculpture in Yerevan, Armenia

- Տղամարդիկ
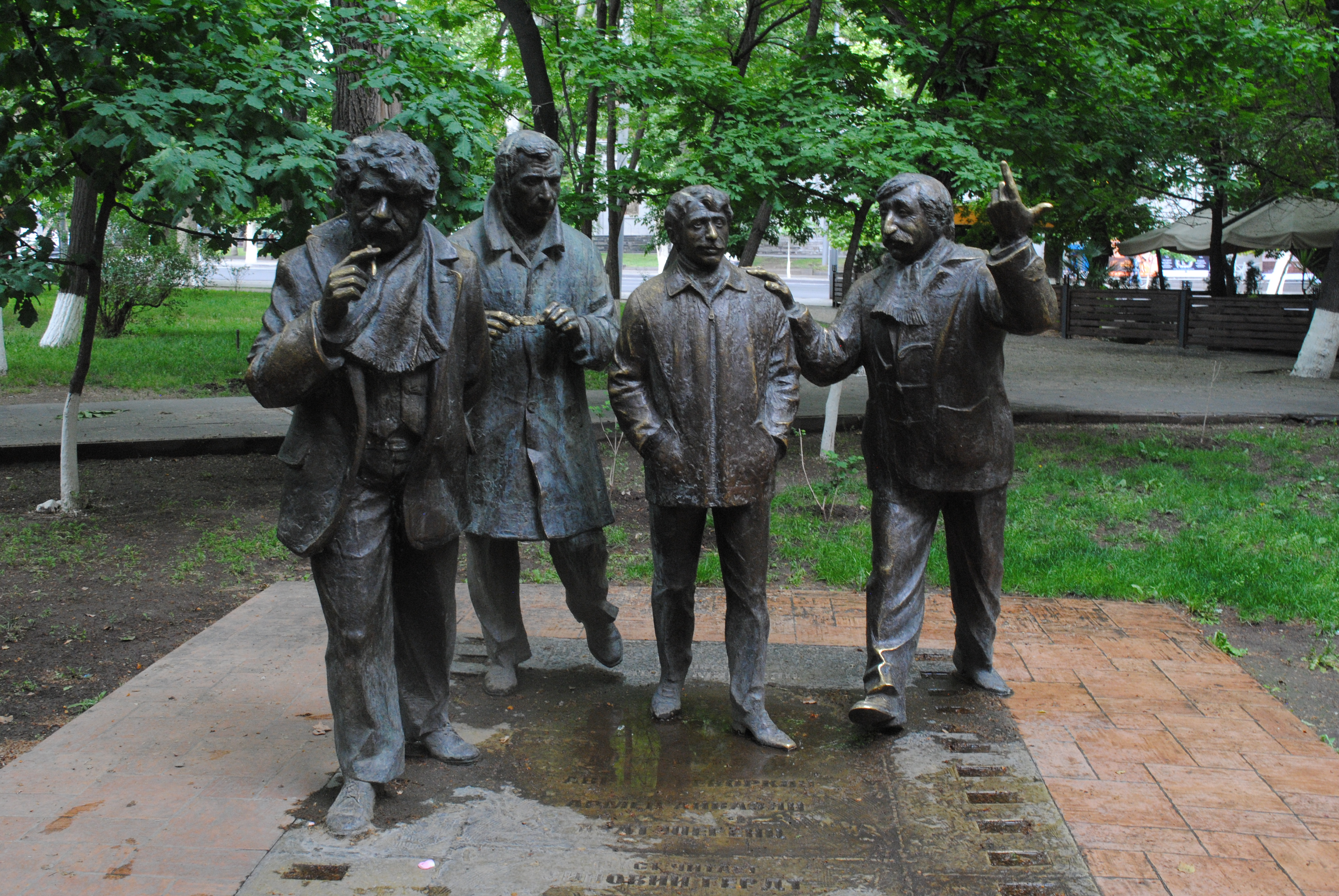
- Artist: Davit Minasyan
- Year: 2007
- Medium: Bronze
- Condition: Good
- Location: Yerevan, Armenia
- 40.186837°N 44.513836°E

The Men (Armenian: Տղամարդիկ) is a public artwork in Yerevan, the capital of Armenia. Created by Armenian sculptor Davit Minasyan in 2007, it commemorates Edmond Keosayan's 1972 film of the same name, and comprises four statues, depicting the film's stars, the actors Mher Mkrtchyan, Avetik Gevorkyan, Armen Ayvazyan, and Azat Sherents.
