= Foreign Devil =

Foreign devil is the literal translation of gweilo, a Cantonese slang term for white people.

Foreign Devil or Foreign Devils may refer to:

== Books ==
- Foreign Devil (novel), a 1999 novel by Christine Harris
- Foreign Devils, a 1972 poetry collection by D. J. Enright
- Foreign Devils, novel by Irvin Faust 1973
- Foreign Devils (novella), a 2003 novella by Andrew Cartmel
- Foreign Devils, a 2015 novel by John Hornor Jacobs
- A Foreign Devil in China, a 1971 biography of Dr. L. Nelson Bell, by John Charles Pollock
- Foreign Devil: Thirty years of reporting from the Far East, a 1972 book by Richard Hughes
- Foreign Devils in the Flowery Kingdom, a 1940 book by Carl Crow
- Foreign Devils on the Silk Road , a 1980 book on the search for the lost cities and treasures of Chinese Central Asia by Peter Hopkirk

== Film and TV ==
- Foreign Devils (film), a 1927 American film by W. S. Van Dyke

== See also ==
- White devil (disambiguation)
