= Border dog Alyi =

1979 film directed by Yuliy Fait

- Directed by: Yuliy Fait
- Written by: Vladimir Golovanov
- Produced by: Georgy Fedyanin
- Starring: Vladimir Dubrovsky; Brutus; Viktor Kosykh
- Cinematography: Alexander Mass
- Edited by: Elena Zabolotskaya
- Music by: Sándor Kallós
- Production company: Gorky Film Studio
- Release date: 1979
- Running time: 71 min
- Country: Soviet Union
- Language: Russian

Border dog Alyi (Russian: Пограничный пёс Алый, romanized: Pogranichnyy pyos Alyi) is a 1979 Soviet drama film directed by Yuliy Fait and based on the short story "Alyi" (Russian: Алый, romanized: Alyy) written by Yury Iosifovich Koval.

== Plot ==
Lyosha Koshkin really wanted to serve on the border and get an official dog. A dream come true: he was Lad Camp, where he got a wonderful East-European Shepherd dog.

== Cast ==
- Vladimir Dubrovsky as Lyosha Koshkin
- dog Brutus as Alyi
- Vasili Kupriyanov as Barabulko
- Viktor Kosykh as Captain Eliseev
- Vladimir Gerasimov as Maslakov
- Alexander Kazakov as Ensign Nicholay Bubentsov
- Arthur Nischenkin as Ensign Lad Camp
- Yana Druz as wife Head outpost's
- Nartai Begalin and Igor Kosukhin as infiltrators
- Alexander Kurennoy (episode)
- Alexander Silin (episode)

== Film shooting ==
Filming took place in parts of the Red Banners Central Asian border district. Participated in the shooting guards 71st Bakharden border detachment, School service dog in Dushanbe, the airmen of the 23rd Dushanbe aviation squadron Soviet Border Troops.
