= When September Comes =

- Russian: Когда наступает сентябрь
- Directed by: Edmond Keosayan
- Written by: Konstantin Isayev; Edmond Keosayan
- Starring: Armen Dzhigarkhanyan; Nikolay Kryuchkov; Laura Gevorkyan; Vladimir Ivashov; Anton Ilyin
- Cinematography: Mikhail Ardabyevsky
- Edited by: Valentina Kulagina
- Music by: Yan Frenkel
- Production company: Mosfilm
- Release date: 1976
- Running time: 86 min.
- Country: Soviet Union
- Language: Russian

When September Comes (Russian: Когда наступает сентябрь, romanized: Kogda nastupaet sentyabr) is a 1976 Soviet children's drama film directed by Edmond Keosayan.

The film tells the story of an elderly and sick man named Levon Poghosyan, who goes to Moscow to congratulate his grandson on the beginning of his school life. He brings joy not only to his loved ones, but also to many other people he meets along the way.

== Plot ==
Levon Pogosyan travels from the Armenian town of Ashtarak to Moscow to enroll his grandson, Levonik, in the first grade. His warm, outgoing personality and readiness to help others quickly make him stand out in the bustling, impersonal atmosphere of the city, where even neighbors rarely interact. At home, his daughter Nune struggles with jealousy toward her husband, who works at a textile factory and participates in amateur theater, often causing tension in their family life. Levon befriends Nikolai Nikolaevich, the grandfather of Katya, a classmate of Levonik. Orphaned after her parents died during a geological expedition in the Pamirs, Katya is lovingly raised by her grandfather. Nikolai, in turn, helps Levon manage health problems stemming from old war wounds. During a routine check-up, doctors discover that Levon does not have long to live, but they decide to withhold this information from him.

Levon’s generous spirit continues to shine despite the looming shadow of his prognosis. A local handyman, Gena, builds a grill for Levon, and he and Levonik prepare shashlik (barbecue) on the balcony of their Moscow high-rise. Concerned neighbors, mistaking the smoke for a fire, call the firefighters, leading to an unexpected and lively gathering. Undeterred, Levon turns the incident into an opportunity to connect with those around him, inviting friends and neighbors to join the meal. His warmth and camaraderie leave a lasting impression on everyone he meets. In the end, Levon’s friends and family gather at the airport to bid him a heartfelt farewell, marking the close of a poignant chapter in their lives.

== Cast ==
- Armen Dzhigarkhanyan as Levon Pogosyan
- Nikolay Kryuchkov as Nikolay Nikolayevich Ivanov
- Laura Gevorkyan as Nune Kondrikova
- Vladimir Ivashov as Volodya Kondrikov
- Anton Ilyin as Levonchik
- Natalya Chernyshova as Katya (as Natasha Chernyshova)
- Ivan Ryzhov as doctor-general
- Galina Polskikh as Natalya Vasilyevna
- Mikhail Metyolkin as policeman Mikhail Mikhaylovich
- Vladimir Nosik as locksmith Gena
- Viktor Avdyushko as Yevgeny Viktorovich
