= European Forum of Medical Associations =

European Forum of Medical Associations (EFMA) is an international organisation with an aim to establish dialogue and cooperation between National Medical Associations (NMAs) and World Health Organization (WHO) in the European Region to improve the quality of health and health care in Europe; promote the exchange of information and ideas between NMAs and WHO; integrate appropriate aspects of policies for health for all into basic, postgraduate and continuing medical education; and as appropriate formulate consensus policy statements on health issues.

== History and development ==
The dialogue between national medical associations and the WHO began in December 1984 with a meeting of western European national medical associations and WHO in Copenhagen. At this time, it was recognized that clearly, the medical profession had an important role to play if the philosophy of the Health For All (HFA) movement in general and the European regional HFA targets, in particular, were to be achieved. Further meetings involving national medical associations, both from the West and East, took place in 1986, 1987 and 1988. At a meeting in Rome in 1990, the national medical associations recognised that they had created a permanent forum permitting a fruitful dialogue with WHO. This was formalized at Helsinki in 1991 when the aims of the Forum were finalized as follows:

"The aims of the Forum shall be, by establishing a dialogue and cooperation between National Medical Associations and the WHO Regional Office for the European Region, to:

a) improve the quality of health and health care in Europe; b) promote the exchange of information and ideas between national medical associations, and between the associations and the World Health Organization; c) integrate appropriate aspects of policies of Health for All into basic, postgraduate and continuing medical education; and d) formulate consensus policy statements on health issues."

For the purposes of membership, a national medical association is defined as a free independent nongovernmental association of physicians constituted in an organization, which elect its own officers, appoints its own staff and determines its own constitution, except for any statutory duties that it undertakes, and whose activities cover all the various aspects of professional practice.

With the changes in the eastern part of the region during the 1990s, there was a need for special dialogue between the countries of the east of the region and those in the west. In Budapest (1994), London (1995) and Stockholm (1996) post-Forum meetings were held for the benefit of the newly emerging and re-establishing national medical associations from this part of the region. In 1997, this was merged with the main meeting and devoted to a discussion on health care reform, based on the 1996 WHO Ljubljana Charter on Reforming Health Care.

In the annual meetings of the Forum, representatives from medical associations in around 40 countries are represented. Observers have included the Canadian Medical Association, which has attended regularly, and a number of Pan-European medical associations.

Each year, national medical associations report not only on their general activities but also on any action they have taken in areas which the Forum has considered. A handbook is updated annually containing information about the constitution, activities, and officers of participating national medical associations.

From the beginning, the problems of tobacco and smoking and the subject of continuing medical education have been subjects of continuing report and action and, starting in Sofia in 1988, the quality of care. The meetings have considered a spectrum of subjects including AIDS, new patterns of infectious diseases, health care in the elderly, health promotion, the rights of patients, the physician's role in environmental health, financing of health care, development of new health care systems, suicide in the young, quality of care development, use/misuse/abuse of drugs, medical education, health care in prisons, and eHealth.

Over the years, the Forum has adopted a number of declarations, statements and recommendations. Some of these statements have been followed up by establishing action groups, notably in relation to tobacco and to the quality of care, in order to assist national medical associations in carrying forward appropriate action in their own countries.

== Annual meetings ==
A meeting of the Forum is organized once a year (normally March or April), to review developments relevant to the medical profession and to exchange experience.

In 2006, the meeting was held in Budapest, hosted by the Hungarian Medical Association, and in 2007 in Lisbon, hosted by the Portuguese Medical Association. On 7 September 2007, EFMA Liaison Committee took place in Yerevan, Armenia, hosted by the Armenian Medical Association. The annual meeting in 2008 took place in Israel on 10–11 April 2008 and was hosted by the Israel Medical Association. In 2012, EFMA meeting was hosted by the Armenian Medical Association and took place on 19–20 April 2012 in Yerevan, Armenia. In addition to Health 2020, the financial crisis, social determinants of health and policies on alcohol were on the agenda.

Participants at the annual meetings comprise representatives from the various medical associations, as well as observers from other associations and organizations in Europe e.g. the World Medical Association (WMA), the Standing Committee of European Doctors, Comité permanent des médecins européens (CPME), Permanent Working Group of European Junior Doctors (PWG), European Union of General Practitioners (UEMO), European Medical Students' Association (EMSA), European Working Group of Practitioners and Specialists in Free Practice (E.A.N.A.), European Federation of Salaried Doctors (FEMS), European Association of Senior Hospital Physicians (A.E.M.H.).

== Countries with member or observer status in EFMA ==
- Albania
- Andorra
- Armenia
- Austria
- Azerbaijan
- Belarus
- Belgium
- Bosnia and Herzegovina
- Bulgaria
- Canada
- Croatia
- Czech Republic
- Denmark
- Estonia
- Finland
- France
- Georgia
- Germany
- Greece
- Hungary
- Iceland
- Ireland
- Israel
- Italy
- Kazakhstan
- Kyrgyzstan
- Lithuania
- Luxembourg
- Macedonia
- Malta
- Netherlands
- Norway
- Poland
- Portugal
- Romania
- Russian Federation
- Serbia
- Slovakia
- Slovenia
- Spain
- Sweden
- Switzerland
- Turkey
- Ukraine
- United Kingdom
- Uzbekistan
