= Parounak Zelveian =

Armenian cardiologist

Parounak Zelveian Պարունակ Զելվեյան
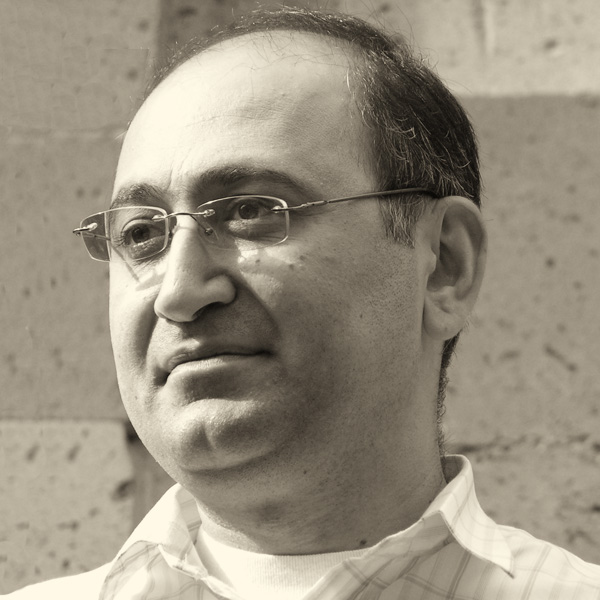
- President of Armenian Medical Association
- Born: September 26, 1966; Yerevan, Armenian SSR
- Education: Yerevan Medical Institute
- Known for: Extensive research of association between sleep apnea and arterial hypertension
- Awards: European Society of Cardiology fellowship
- Scientific career
- Fields: Arterial hypertension, sleep apnea
- Workplaces: A.L. Myasnikov Institute of Clinical Cardiology (Moscow), L.A. Ohanesyan Institute of Cardiology (Yerevan)
- Doctoral advisor: G. Arabidze, A. Rogoza, E. Oshchepkova

Parounak H. Zelveian (Armenian: Պարունակ Հարությունի Զելվեյան; born 26 September 1966) is a specialist in the field of arterial hypertension and sleep apnea and founder of the Armenian Medical Association.

== Positions ==
- Director of National Institute of Health (since 2012)
- Head of Preventive Cardiology Center at L.A. Ohanesyan Institute of Cardiology (since 2007)
- Executive secretary of Armenian Cardiologists Association (since 2007)
- Chief cardiologist of Yerevan (since 2007)
- Deputy Director for Science of L.A. Ohanesyan Institute of Cardiology (since 2005)
- President of Armenian Medical Association (since its foundation in 2002).
