= The New Adventures of the Elusive Avengers =

- Original American film poster
- Directed by: Edmond Keosayan
- Written by: Edmond Keosayan; Artur Makarov
- Starring: Mikhail Metyolkin; Vasily Vasilyev; Viktor Kosykh; Valentina Kurdyukova
- Music by: Yan Frenkel
- Production company: Mosfilm
- Release date: 1968
- Running time: 78 minutes
- Country: Soviet Union
- Language: Russian

The New Adventures of the Elusive Avengers (Russian: Новые приключения Неуловимых, translit. Novye prikluchenya Neulovimykh) is a 1968 Soviet action adventure film, a sequel of The Elusive Avengers, by Mosfilm. Directed by Edmond Keosayan, the film was followed by The Crown of the Russian Empire, or Once Again the Elusive Avengers, also directed by Keosayan, and released in 1971.

== Plot ==
Sometime after joining the Red Army, the "Elusive Avengers", a posse of young Red partisans, including Valerka, a former schoolboy; Yashka, a devil-may-care gypsy; and two orphan siblings, Danka and his sister Kosanka. They join the Red Army and fight Baron Wrangel's White Guards. They intercept an airplane carrying a letter to the Baron. The letter reveals that a map of fortifications in Crimea is in possession of the White counter-intelligence officer, Colonel Kudasov. This map is vital for the Red Army assault, and the Avengers are sent on a secret mission to steal the map.

The four enter Yalta on a fishing boat and disguise themselves. Danka assumes the guise of a shoe-cleaner, and Valerka fashions himself as a young monarchist nobleman. Meanwhile, the Red agent they were sent to is arrested by Kudasov and killed when he tries to escape, leaving the Avengers on their own.

Ksanka meets Buba Kastorsky, a popular singer and dancer who helped the Avengers in their first adventure. Buba tells them about a White officer who probably knows the combination for Kudasov's safe. Valerka visits the cabaret often frequented by this officer, Captain Ovechkin, and befriends him. But Danka is arrested, because Ataman Burnash comes to the city and recognizes him. Yashka meets the local Gypsies and persuades them to help freeing Danka.

Then Captain Ovechkin recognizes Valerka for what he is, gloats at him and tells him the combination, intending to arrest him immediately, but Valerka detonates a pool-ball filled with explosives and escapes. He dashes to the Counterintelligence Service headquarters, infiltrates it and steals the map. Soldiers surround the headquarters, but Danka, Yashka and Kosanka distract the soldiers and let Valerka escape with the map. The Avengers, along with Buba, flee the city, but a White officer shoots Buba when they are already escaping on a boat.

== Cast ==
- Mikhail Metyolkin – Valerka Meshcheryakov
- Vasily Vasilyev – Yashka the Gypsy
- Viktor Kosykh – Danka Shchus
- Valentina Kurdyukova – Ksanka Shchus
- Armen Dzhigarkhanyan – captain Pyotr Sergeyevich Ovechkin
- Boris Sichkin – Buba Kastorsky, actor and singer
- Arkady Tolbuzin – colonel Leopold Sergeyevich Kudasov
- Vladimir Ivashov – lieutenant Perov, Kudasov's adjutant
- Yefim Kopelyan – chieftain Ignat Burnash
- Konstantin Sorokin – Mefody Kuzmich, carousel owner
- Ivan Pereverzev – Smirnov, chief of staff of Red Cavalry Army
- Nikolay Fedortsov – Andrei, underground fighter
- Yevgeny Vesnik – drunk colonel
- Sergey Filippov – Koshkin, apothecary, expert on explosions
- Savely Kramarov – Ilyukha Verekhov, cross-eyed convoy, former bandit
- Eduard Abalov – episode
- Yan Frenkel – violinist (uncredited)
