= Armenian Medical Association =

The Armenian Medical Association (ArMA; Armenian: Հայկական Բժշկական Ասոցիացիա), founded in 2002 by Parounak Zelveian, is a professional union of doctors, biomedical scientists and public health professionals in Armenia. ArMA is a non-profit NGO with objectives of promoting high-level medical practice, education and research; fostering advanced ethical behaviour by medical professionals; protecting independence and rights of both doctors and patients.

== Young Medics International Conference ==
The main biannual event of ArMA is the Young Medics International Conference (YMIC). Four YMICs were organized in 2001, 2003, 2005 and 2007, Yerevan, Armenia.

== International Memberships ==
- ArMA is a member of World Medical Association (WMA)
- ArMA is a member of European Forum of Medical Associations (EFMA)
