= Red Devils (story) =

Red Devils (Russian: Красные дьяволята, also known as The Hunt for Blue Fox, Russian: Охота за голубой лисицей) is a revolutionary adventure story written by the secretary of the Governorate Committee of the Kostroma RCP (B), novelist and screenwriter Pavel Blyakhin in 1921 and published in 1923–1926. The book became popular after the film adaptation of the novel in 1923.

== Process ==
The author describes the process of writing the story:

The story "Red Devils" was written by me in 1921 in a car, freight car, on the way from Kostroma in Baku. Instead of three days, I went one month. On a makeshift table ready laid Mauser ... This was one of the first books about the Civil War.

The civil war was coming to an end, but robberies and raids of gangs on trains and food bases continued. More than once we had to grab the weapon and jump out of the rail car. Trains often stopped: there was not enough fuel for locomotives, and the passengers themselves helped to produce firewood and coal. The country was exhausted from hunger, devastation and disease. But the Soviet people patiently endured all the hardships and fought heroically against the remnants of the invaders and the counter-revolution. Together with the older generation fought for the power of the Soviets and our youth, boys and girls and even teenage children.

— Pavel Blyahin

== Plot ==
The novel is about the adventures of three young agents, fighters of the 1st Cavalry Army, set against the background of the Russian Civil War and the struggle with the Makhnovist forces. At the beginning Nestor Makhno and his troops attack the village, committing various crimes, including murdering peasants, robbing huts, stealing livestock and killing Communists. In the attack, one guy's father is captured, tortured and killed under Makhno's orders. Afterwards, the three of them organize a detachment against Makhno.

== Characters ==
- Misha and Dunyasha are young scouts, soldiers in the First Cavalry Army.
- Chinese man Yu-Yu
- Bat'ko Makhno
- Yesaul
- The bandits

== Makhno ==
The novel gives a negative portrayal of the anarchist Nestor Makhno. For example:

Land of the Soviets was burning in the fire of civil war. From all sides the heart of Russia - Moscow - moved numerous hordes of counter-revolution, From the east, the north and south were threatened by foreign invaders who supplied White Army weapons and food. In Crimea, sat down Wrangel troops which broke the Ukraine, in the area of Katerinoslavshchina.

And here, in the rear of a young Red Army rampaged kulak gang, led by different Batko and leader. Urban workers and the rural poor selflessly fought for Soviet power, helped the Red Army and all our partisans than could. Hundreds and thousands of young volunteers joined the ranks of the glorious fighters for the cause of freedom and socialism. During these terrible years, surrounded by enemies, the Soviet people lived hard, hungry and cold. After the war the industry was destroyed, fields are sown, even the bread was not enough to supply the Red Army. Country kulaks-the rich hid their bread and products, and in pits secret places, engaged in speculation and brutally robbed city population to go down for bread and potatoes last belongings. In those days, to which the action of our story, the same situation was in the city of Ekaterinoslav.

In Polye and throughout Ekaterinoslav province, Makhno's famous gang robbed civilians in Ukraine. Acting in the rear of the Red Army, the gang brought incalculable harm Soviet people: organized pogroms, looting base supply, killing Soviet workers, especially the Bolsheviks and Red partisans. Village rich and bourgeois assisted them in every way in the struggle against Soviet power. They wanted to restore the old regime, the Tsar and landlords.

== Films ==
- Red Devils (film)
- The Elusive Avengers
