= Lancaster High School (Virginia) =

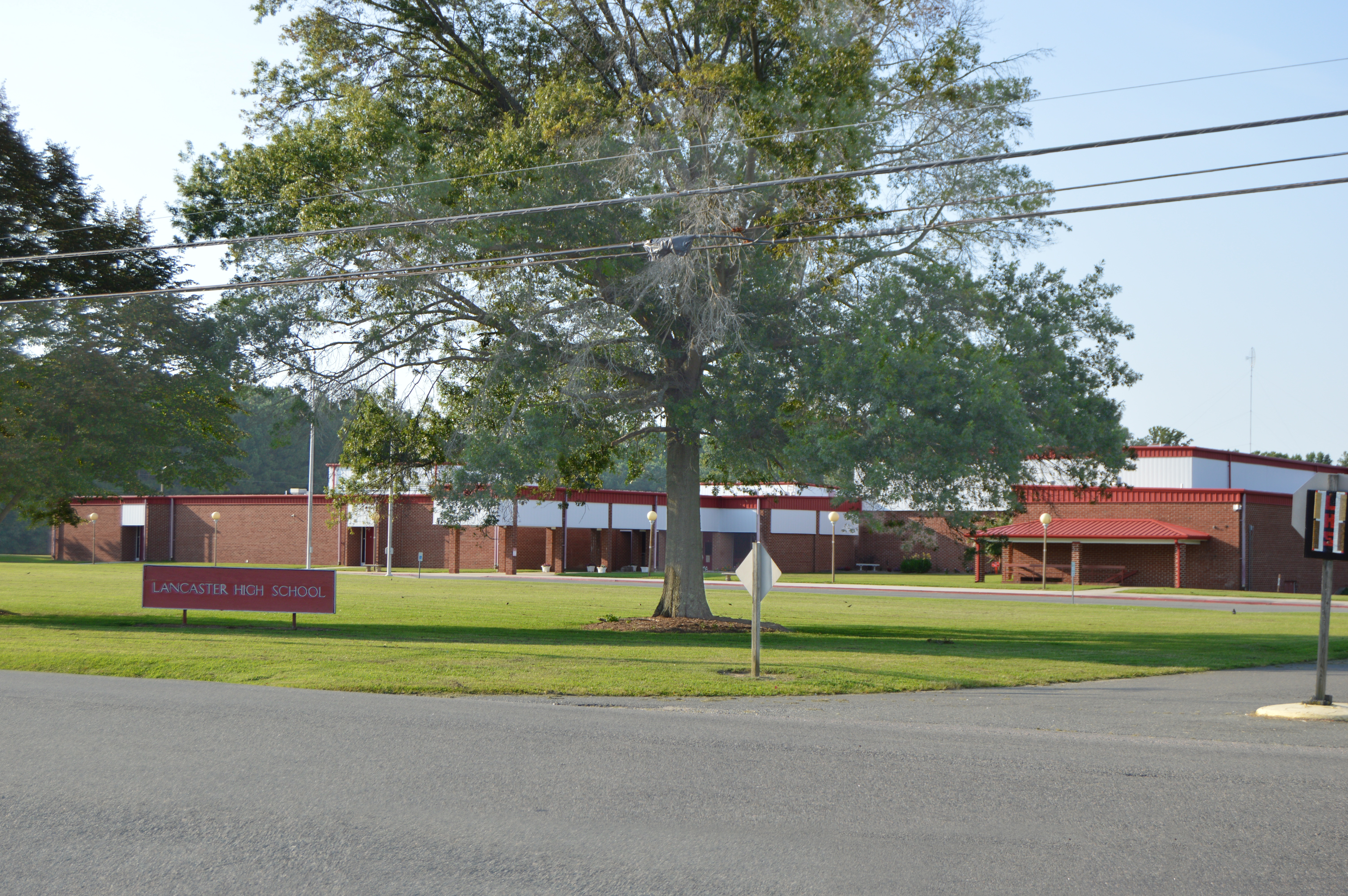
- Roadside view

Location
- 8815 Mary Ball Road; Lancaster, Virginia 22503; United States
- Coordinates: 37.769°N 76.456°W

Information
- Other name: LHS
- Type: Public high school
- School district: Lancaster County Public Schools
- NCES School ID: 510216000887
- Principal: Michael Myers
- Teaching staff: 30.00 (on an FTE basis)
- Grades: 9–12
- Enrollment: 386 (2016-2017)
- Student to teacher ratio: 12.87
- Colors: Red and White
- Mascot: Red Devil
- Website: www.lcs.k12.va.us

Lancaster High School (LHS) is a public high school in Lancaster, Virginia, United States.
